= Shery Adel =

Egyptian actress (born 1988)

- Born: Sherine Adel; April 19, 1988 (age 38); Cairo, Egypt
- Education: Ain Shams University
- Occupations: Actress, hostess
- Years active: 2001–present
- Spouse: Tarek Sabri

Sherine Adel (Arabic: شيرين عادل; born 19 April 1988), better known as Shery Adel (Arabic: شيري عادل), is an Egyptian actress. She began acting when she was a child in TV advertisements. Her first film role was in Friends or Business in 2001. She then acted in many movies such as: Outlaw in 2007, Hassan and Marcus in 2008, Amer Al-Behar in 2009 and A Bewildered Lovebird in 2010. She also acted in many series such as: King Farouk in 2007 as Narriman Sadek, Unknown Number in 2012, Temporary Name in 2013, and The Sin in 2014. She was labeled as Egyptian cinema chocolate (Arabic: شوكولاتة السينما المصرية).

== Early life ==
She was born in Cairo and her real name is Sherine Adel. She studied business at Ain Shams University. She began to act when she was a child in TV advertisements, before leaving TV and returning to her first role in cinema. She appeared in Friends or business in 2001 with Mostafa Qamar and Amr Waked.

== Career ==
She acted in many main roles such as King Farouk in 2007 which she acted Queen Narriman Sadek with Taim Hasan. Women dont know contrition in 2009, Queen in exile in 2010 as Princess Fathia Ghali with Nadia Al-Gindi, The Citizen x in 2011, Unknown number in 2012, Temporary name in 2013, The sin in 2014 with Sherif Mounir and Reham Abdel Ghafour, Time difference in 2014 with Tamer Hosny and Nicole Saba, The House secrets in 2015 with Hana Shiha, Iblis game in 2015, Superman's Girls in 2016 with Yosra El Lozy and Riham Hajaj, Naseeby We Esmetak in 2016–2017 with Hany Salama and Nicole Saba, and The Black horse in 2017 with Ahmed El Sakka.

In movies she had also many main roles such as Hassan and Marcus in 2008 with Adel Emam and Omar Sharif, Ameer Elbehar in 2009 with Mohamed Henedi, A Bewildered Lovebird in 2010 with Ahmed Helmy, Dawlat security in 2011 with Hamada Helal, My woman and wife in 2014 with Ramez Galal, Sukkar mur in 2015 with Ahmed El-Fishawy and Haytham Ahamed Zaki, Where s my heart in 2017 with Mostafa Qamar and Yosra El Lozy. In 2009, she won Best coming actress award in Alexandria International Film Festival.

== Personal life ==
In July 2018 she celebrated her wedding with producer Moez Masoud, and she announced her divorce in 2019.

== Works ==
=== Films ===
- Friends or business in 2001
- Hamada playing in 2005
- Outlaw in 2007
- Hassan and Marcus in 2008
- Klashinkov in 2008
- Ameer Albehar in 2009
- A Bewildered Lovebird in 2010
- Dawlat security in 2011
- My woman and wife in 2014
- Sukkar murr in 2015
- Where s my heart in 2017

=== Series ===
- Albaydaa in 2001
- Girl from Shubra in 2004
- The port and sailor in 2005
- One Thousand and One Nights: Salem and Ghanem in 2005
- I want solution in 2005
- Love after agreement in 2006
- The Cindrela in 2006
- Shark demon in 2006
- My life is you in 2006
- Yetraba fe ezo in 2007
- King Farouk in 2007
- Womans heart in 2007
- Soul breeze in 2008
- Right word in 2008
- Night of foxes in 2008
- Women dont know remorse in 2009
- The man and The way in 2009
- Sheikh of Arabs Hamam in 2009
- Ragekl wa set setat 6 in 2010
- A queen in exile in 2010
- Lazem baba yeheb in 2011
- The citizen x in 2011
- Unknown number in 2012
- Bab Al-khalq in 2012
- Temporary name in 2013
- Al Saqar Shaheen in 2013
- Identity proving in 2013
- The sin in 2014
- Time difference in 2014
- ALboyot asrar in 2015
- Iblis game in 2015
- Superman's Girls in 2016
- Naseeby We Esmetak 1-2 in 2016-2017
- The black horse in 2017
- The rogue arrows in 2018
- Esmo eh in 2019

=== Stages ===
- Egypt above all problems in 2014

=== Hosting ===
- Musalsaliko in 2013
