= Emad El Bahat =

Egyptian film director and screenwriter

- Born: Emad Atiya Ali El-Bahat; 20 May 1970 (age 55)
- Occupation: film director . screenwriter

Emad Atiya Ali El-Bahat (born 20 May 1970), is an Egyptian film director and screenwriter, also works as assistant for advertisements, documentaries and several shootings of foreign films in Egypt. Emad Elbahat's passion to cinema industry led him to meet three of the best and most important filmmakers in Egypt, Youssef Chahine, actually, Elbahat is the most influenced by, Daoud Abd El-Sayyed and Yousri Nasr Allah.

== Film career ==
In the early nineties, Elbahat grew interested in experimental cinema, he ruled as an assistant for Daoud Abd El-Sayyed and Yousri Nasr Allah, both directors were the real foundation of Elbahat's future film career. Later, Emad Elbahat was one of the few directors who had the luck to feel, breath and see cinema through the eyes of one of the most brilliant and well known movie makers in Egypt and worldwide, Youssef Chahine, so far considers as Elbahat's godfather, he was known as first assistant for Chahine's movies, Sokoot Hansawar (2001), Alexandria-New-York (2003).

In 2004 he began work on directing his first feature film, Hide and Seek, which was released in 2006. The script received a grant from the French Centre National de la Cinématographie (CNC) at the Carthage Film Festival in Tunisia and obtains excellent reviews in Cairo film festival and Dubai film festival at the same year (2006). In 2007, Elbahat finished shooting his second movie The Clown, he wrote and directed.

=== El-Belyatcho 2007 ===
Starring Haitham Ahmed Zaki, Ahmed salary, Fathi Abdel Wahab, Sawsan Badr, Heidi Karam, We have, Abdullah Musharraf. The film revolves under the teaser on a clown in a circus, who is facing a real crisis destroys his simple life, the film monitors through this character of "The Clown", issues of oppression and tyranny which are subjected to some ordinary people, exposing many social issues, and political interest to the Egyptian society. Screenplay Emad and Mohamed Al-Fekki, directed by Emad Elbhatt, produced by Al-Arabia Company for production and film distribution.

=== Ostoghomaia 2006 ===
Sharif and Leila are a couple who was rejected by society, parents and relatives because their Forbidden relationship had started before the marriage years, they meet their close friends to celebrate their marriage. Their friends, Yossef is a filmmaker who just returned from France After a scholarship lasted for 3 years, his ex-girlfriend Dr. Salma belongs to conservative family, she was raised in Saudi Arabia, Mustafa, strict journalist and Yahya, a former navy Captain, suggests to play a game, reincarnation, where each one of them impersonates another as he sees it, revealing aspects of his personality, whether it is negative or positive, they play till the night ends. starring Ahmad Yahya, Sarah Bassam, Heidi Karam, Nabil Issa, Amr Mamdouh, Assistant Director Amir Ramses

== Filmography ==
Year	English Title	Original Title	Notes
2007	The Clown	El-Belyatcho	Director & screenwriter
2006	Hide & Seek	Ostoghomaia	Director & screenwriter Cairo Film Festival competition, 2006; Dubai film festival, 2006; The script received a grant from the French Centre National de la Cinématographie (CNC) at the Carthage Film Festival, Tunisia, 2004
2003	Alexandria... New-York	Alexandria... New-York	First Assistant Filmed by Youssef Chahine
2002	11/09/01	11/09/01	First Assistant Short Movie by Youssef Chahine
2001	Silence, We're Rolling	Sokoot Hansawar	First Assistant Film by Youssef Chahine; Entitled "Before the shooting"
1999	Le Nil	Al-Nile	Second Assistant Japanese Film
1998	The City	Al-Madina	First Assistant Filmed by Yousri Nasr Allah
1997	Infidelity	Infidelity	Second Assistant French Film by Randa Al Chahal
1997	The Destiny	Al-Maseer	Assistant Filmed by Youssef Chahine
1996	Akhenaton	Akhenaton	Assistant and Casting Director Documentary Movie for the German channel ZDF
1995	Youssef Chahine	Youssef Chahine	First Assistant 12-Part Documentary Movie by Mohamed Chebl about the life of the Egyptian director Youssef Chahine
1994	The Emigrant	Al-Mohager	Assistant Filmed by Youssef Chahine
1993	Land of Dreams	Ard El-Ahlam	Assistant (script-light) Filmed by Daoud Abd El-Sayyed
1993	Mercedes	Mercedes	Assistant Filmed by Yousri Nasr Allah
