= The Knight and the Princess =

2019 Egyptian animated film

- Original film poster
- الفارس و الأميرة
- Directed by: Bashir al-Deek
- Starring: Haitham El-Khamissi, Mohamed Henedi, Donia Samir Ghanem, Medhat Saleh, Maged El Kedwany, Lekaa Elkhamissi, Abla Kamel, Abdel Rahman Abou Zahra, Amina Rizk, and Saeed Saleh
- Music by: Haitham Al-Khamisi
- Release dates: September 2019 (El Gouna Film Festival); 30 January 2020
- Running time: 95 minutes
- Country: Egypt
- Languages: Arabic, English
- Budget: $3 million
- Box office: E£143,385 ($10,386)

The Knight and the Princess is a 2019 Egyptian animated musical action-drama film. It is notable as first-ever Egyptian animated feature film. It was directed by Bashir el-Deek, produced by Alabbas Hamidaddin, and created by cartoonist Mustafa Hussein. The film stars Haitham Elkhamissi, Mohamed Henedi, Donia Samir Ghanem, Medhat Saleh, Maged El Kedwany, Lekaa Elkhamissi, Abla Kamel, Abdel Rahman Abou Zahra, Amina Rizk, and Saeed Saleh.

The film premiered at the 2019 El Gouna Film Festival, and released to theatres on 30 January 2020. It was selected to show at the 2020 Annecy International Animation Film Festival, making it the first Arab feature film to show at the festival.

== Plot ==
The film takes inspiration from the seventh-century tale of Muhammad bin Qasim, a 15-year-old Arab commander from Basra in the Umayyad era. In the film, he’s a young, idealistic adventurer who plans to rescue the wives and children of deceased sea merchants that have been taken prisoner by pirates and King Daher the Great of Sindh. Before accomplishing his mission, Mohammed falls in love with Princess Lola Benny of Qossah after saving her life, only to have to leave her to go defeat the Daher and his army.

== Recognition ==
The Knight and the Princess was lauded for its representation of Arabs and countering stereotypes often found in Western-produced entertainment. The film was selected to show at the 2020 Annecy International Animation Film Festival; won the Grand Prix at the 2021 ANIMAFILM International Animation Festival, and was nominated in for Best Animated Feature Film at the 2021 Asia Pacific Screen Awards but lost out to The Nose or the Conspiracy of Mavericks.
