= Belal Fadl =

Egyptian screenwriter

- Born: 5 September 1974 (age 51); Cairo
- Citizenship: Egypt
- Occupations: Screenwriter, writer, journalist, novelist

Belal Fadl (Arabic: بلال فضل; born September 5, 1974) is an Egyptian screenplay writer, journalist and a column writer. He was born and raised in Cairo, Egypt, but has Alexandrian roots. Fadl graduated from Cairo University's Faculty of Mass Communication with excellent grades and honours. He began his career as a journalist at the magazine Rose al-Yūsuf then became a co-founder and secretary at Al-Dustour, before eventually joining Al-Masry Al-Youm to write his column "Istibaha" and becoming one of the most important columnists in Egypt.

In 2013, Fadl and Amr Sleem created El-Maasara, which was published by the newspaper Al-Shorouk. It was a weekly publication that sarcastically described the current events in Egypt. In 2001, his first script was made into the movie Thieves in KG2 which was directed by Sandra Nashaat. He wrote 18 movies, most of which topped the Egyptian box office.

Fadl moved to the US in 2014, and lives in New York City.

== Journalism ==
- In 1994, Fadl worked as a trainee journalist in Rose al-Yūsuf, which was then a platform for the liberal and leftist opposition.
- In 1995–1998, Fadl became co-founder, secretary editor and columnist in the prominent opposition newspaper Al-Dustour (closed by a presidential decree in early 1998).
- After the closure of Al-Dustour newspaper, he wrote for different newspapers and magazines including Al-Hilal, Al-Ittihad and London-based Asharq Al-Awsat.
- In 2000, he co-founded Al-Qahera newspaper issued by the Egyptian Ministry of culture. In Al-Qahera, he worked as a managing editor for several months before quitting to devote himself to screenwriting.
- In 2005, he resumed his journalistic writings in Al-Dustour newspaper, after its reopening. He began editing a weekly page titled Qalamin, accompanied by the cartoonist Amr Sleem. Qalamin introduced direct political sarcastic critique against the former Egyptian president Hosni Mubarak, trying to push the boundaries and cross the usual red lines. This led him to court and prosecutors 17 times. Most notably, Libyan dictator Muammar Gaddafi demanded the imprisonment of him and Al-Dustour editor-in-chief Ibrahim Eissa because of an article Fadl wrote about him titled "Al-Ragol Al-Akhdar" meaning the Green Man.
- In 2006, he began writing a weekly column in Al-Masry Al-Youm newspaper.
- Later in 2007, he began to write a daily column in Al-Masry Al-Youm titled Istebaha for 8 months, then he stopped to devote himself to writing his first TV series Hima.
- In 2008, he resumed writing Istibaha which was considered to be the most daring in criticizing the Mubarak regime, and played a role in raising the distribution of Al-Masry Al-Youm newspaper to be the most prevalent newspaper in Egypt.
- In 2011, he moved to El Tahrir, which was launched after the Egyptian revolution of 2011 and the removal of Hosni Mubarak.
- Later in 2011, during the reign of the Supreme Council of the Armed Forces, he resumed his political satire with the cartoonist Amr Sleem issuing a two-page titled El Ma'ssara in the Egyptian newspaper Al-Shorouk.

== Filmography ==
Belal Fadl's work:

- in 2001, one of his scripts was made into his first movie, Thieves in KG2, directed by Sandra Nashaat and starring Karim Abdel-Aziz and Hanan Tork. The movie was a huge hit and dominated the Egyptian Box office at the time.
- He continued his cinematic success as he wrote 18 movies, most of which topped the Egyptian box office.
- The Beach Loafer (2004) - (writer)
- Khalty Faransa (2004) - (writer)
- The student Cop/ ar:الباشا تلميذ (فيلم) (2004) - story - screenplay
- Sayed the Romantic (2005) - (writer)
- Aabu Ali (2005) - (writer)
- Wesh Egram ar:وش إجرام - (2005) (writer)
- Wahed Men Alnas (2006) - story and screen play
- The first Saudi feature-length film Keif al-Hal? (2006) - story and screenplay with Lebanese critic Mohammed Rouda.
- Haha we tofaha (2006) - (writer)
- Awdet El Nadla (2006) (writer)
- Fe Mahatet masr (2006) (writer)
- Kharej ala el kanoun (2007) (story - screenplay)
- Swimming Boltia / Boltya EL Ayma (2008) (story and screenplay). For which he was awarded the National Egyptian Film Festival prize for Best Screenplay.
- Hima (TV series) (2008) (writer)
- Ahl Cairo (People of Cairo) (2010) - (writer)
- El Ragol El Ghamed Beslamto ar:الرجل الغامض بسلامته (فيلم) (2010) (writer)
- 18 Days (2011) The film comprises 10 shorts revolving around different facets of the 18 days of the 25 January 2011 revolution which led to overthrowing former President Hosni Mubarak. The events take place in Tahrir Square and outside it and are narrated from different points of view; either, against, enthusiasts, opportunists, or even indifferent. Fadl wrote two out of the ten shorts: God's Creation directed by Kamla Abou Zikri and When the Flood Hits You directed by Mohammed Ali. The film's first premiere was in special screening in Cannes Film Festival
- El Horoub TV series (2012) (writer)
- Sister Teresa TV series (2012) (writer)
- Ahl Eskendereya (People of Alexandria) (2014) (writer): the series, which was produced by the official Egyptian TV, was banned from screening on state and private channels due to pressures from the state's security apparatus. In addition to the oppositional political stances of writer Fadl and several actors, notably Amr Waked and Basma Hassan, it is also likely that the series, directed by veteran director Khairy Beshara, was banned because of its portrayal of a corrupt police officer.
