= Shereen Seif El-Nasr =

Egyptian actress (1967–2024)

- شيرين سيف النصر
- Died: April 13, 2024

Shereen Seif El-Nasr (November 27, 1967 – April 13, 2024) was an Egyptian film and television actress.

Shereen Seif El-Nasr was born in 1967 in Jordan, the daughter of Egyptian journalist Elham Seif El-Nasr from Upper Egypt, and a Palestinian mother. She graduated in 1991 from Ain Shams University in Cairo with a degree in law and worked at the Egyptian Embassy in France.

She began acting while still in school, with her debut leading role in the film El-Ostaz (The Teacher) in 1990. Her breakout role was in Hassan Ibrahim's Sawaq Al-Hanem (The Lady’s Driver, 1994), where she played the spoiled daughter of a rich family who falls in love with the family's driver, Hamada (Ahmed Zaki). She also appeared in Hekaayet Soha (The Story of Soha, 1994) and alongside Adel Emam in Sherif Arafa's Al-Noum fil Assal (Sweet Oblivion, 1996) as Salma, an investigative journalist.

On television, she appeared on Wagih Al-Shenawi’s Ghadboun wa Ghadebaat (Angry Men and Women, 1993) and the second season of Magdi Abu-Emera’s Al-Mal Wal Banoun (The Fortune and the Progeny, 1995). She appeared in the show Wa Man Alathy La Yuhibu Fatma? (Who Doesn’t Love Fatma?, 1996), about a man (Ahmed Abdelaziz) who is turned down for marriage and loses his job, so he seeks a new life in Austria. El-Nasr played Margaret, his love interest there. She also appeared in the comedy series Al Les Alazy Ohebo (1997).

She did little acting between 1996 and 2001 during a marriage that ended in divorce.

She had a lead role in the box office hit Ameer Al-Thalaam (The Prince of Darkness, 2002) directed by Ramy Imam, where she played Alia, an artist who becomes the love interest of a tortured blind veteran (Adel Emam). Her final role was in Amr Abdeen’s television series As’ab Qarar (The Hardest Decision, 2007).

Shereen Seif El-Nasr died on 13 April 2024.
