= Kimo and his Buddy =

- Directed by: Said Hamed
- Starring: Amer Mounib
- Release dates: March 3, 2004
- Country: Egypt
- Language: Arabic

Kimo wi Antimo (Arabic: كيمو وأنتيمو, "Kimo and his Buddy") is an Egyptian film produced by Mohamed Hasib Abdou.

In the film two artists from Alexandria travel to Cairo to become well-known.

== Cast ==
- Amer Mounib (Kimo) - Youssef Rakha of Al-Ahram Weekly said that as Kimo, "Mounib is a present-day incarnation of the romantic hero-social underdog image popularised in many Abdel-Halim Hafez films of the 1960s."
- Tarek Abdel-Aziz (Hammou, Kimo's friend) - Rakha said "Judged against younger comedians like Ahmed Rizk [...] and Maged el-Kedwany [...], Abdel-Aziz's performance as Mounib's sidekick falls short of what new-wave comedy enthusiasts expect."
- Mai Ezzeddin (Samia, Kimo's love interest)

== Reception ==
Youssef Rakha of Al Ahram Weekly said "Though far from credible the script is well paced and ends with a solid climax worthy of Abdel-Halim Hafez."
