= Hassan and Marcus =

- Promotional Poster
- Directed by: Ramy Imam
- Written by: Youssef Maaty
- Starring: Omar Sharif; Adel Emam; Lebleba
- Distributed by: Good News Group
- Release date: 1 August 2008
- Country: Egypt
- Language: Egyptian Arabic

Hassan and Marcus (Arabic: حسن ومرقص) is a 2008 Egyptian comedy-drama film starring Omar Sharif, Adel Emam and Lebleba. It is written by Youssef Maaty and directed by Ramy Imam.

== Plot ==
When the lives of Mahmoud, a Muslim sheikh (Omar Sharif) and Boulos, a Christian priest (Adel Emam) are threatened by religious extremists on both sides, the Egyptian government inducts them into a witness protection program that requires them to disguise themselves as the Christian, Marcus Abdel-Shahid, and a Muslim sheikh, Hassan el-Attar, respectively.

When, unwittingly, they move into the same building, a friendship blossoms that must, along with a romance between the protagonists' children, withstand the difficulties of prejudice and social persecution.

Hassan and Marcus do not attempt to name the reasons for the tension between Christians and Muslims but, according to the political writer and Coptic Christian Sameh Fawzi, the conflicts have nothing to do with religion.

== Cast ==
- Omar Sharif as Mahmoud/Marcus
- Adel Emam as Boulos/Hassan el Attar
- Lebleba as Matilda/Zeenat
- Hanaa El Shorbagy as Khairia
- Mohamed Emam as Gerges/Emad
- Shery Adel as Mariam/Fatima
- Ezzat Abou Aouf as Major General Mokhtar Salem
- Diaa El-Mirghani as Sheikh Mustafa
- Youssef Dawoud as George the Jeweler
- Edward as Hani
- Hassan Abdel Fattah as Bakery worker
- Hala Fakher as Amina, Major General Mokhtar's wife
- Abdallah Musharraf as Boulos's friend
- Hassan Mustafa as Sheikh Bilal
- Ahmed Sami Abdullah as Abdel Hadi
- Mustafa Haridi as Girgis's friend
- Mohamed Sharaf as Bakery worker
- Sayed Sadek as Extremist priest
- Merit Osama as Nancy
- Mohsen Mansour as Member of the Gamal
- Hanaa Abdel Fattah as William, the building owner
- Diaa Abdel Khaleq as Minya police officer
- Mounir Makram as One of the questioners in the mosque

== Background ==
Being the first collaboration between Adel Emam and Omar Sharif, arguably the most prominent actors in Egypt and the Middle East, the movie was a much-anticipated summer blockbuster. However, its message proved so controversial that Facebook groups sporting Adel Emam's picture in Coptic garb called for a boycott of his movies, and the resulting emotional distress is reported to have prompted Imam to move from his home in Cairo to a summer house in Porto Marina, a resort on Egypt's northern coast. Imam, Sharif and other collaborators on the film have vehemently defended its content and criticised many conservatives and religious extremists who consider it blasphemous.

== Themes ==
The film addresses issues of religious extremism, intolerance and sectarian violence, and emphasises the possibility of friendship and love among members of different religions.

Imam said of the film:

I have declared war using art against the extremists—against those who foment differences between us. I hope Christians and Muslims will leave the cinema and embrace one another.
