= Hello Brother =

Hello Brother may refer to:

== Film and television ==
- Hello Brother (1994 film), a Telugu film starring Akkineni Nagarjuna, Soundarya and Ramya Krishna and directed by E.V.V. Satyanarayana
- Hello Brother (1999 film), a Hindi film starring Salman Khan and Rani Mukerji and directed by Sohail Khan
- Hello, Brother, a 2005 South Korean film directed by Lim Tai-kyung
- "Hello Brother", an episode from the eighth season of the television series The Vampire Diaries
- Hello Brother, an in-development film by Moez Masoud

== Music ==
- "Hello Brother", a song from the soundtrack of the 2010 Australian film Legend of the Guardians: The Owls of Ga'Hoole
- "Hello Brother", a song from the soundtrack of the 2014 Tamil film Irumbu Kuthirai
- "Hello Brother", a 2019 song by Nigerian singer Omah Lay

== See also ==
- "Goodbye Brother", a song from Game of Thrones
