= Sandra Nashaat =

Egyptian film director (born 1970)

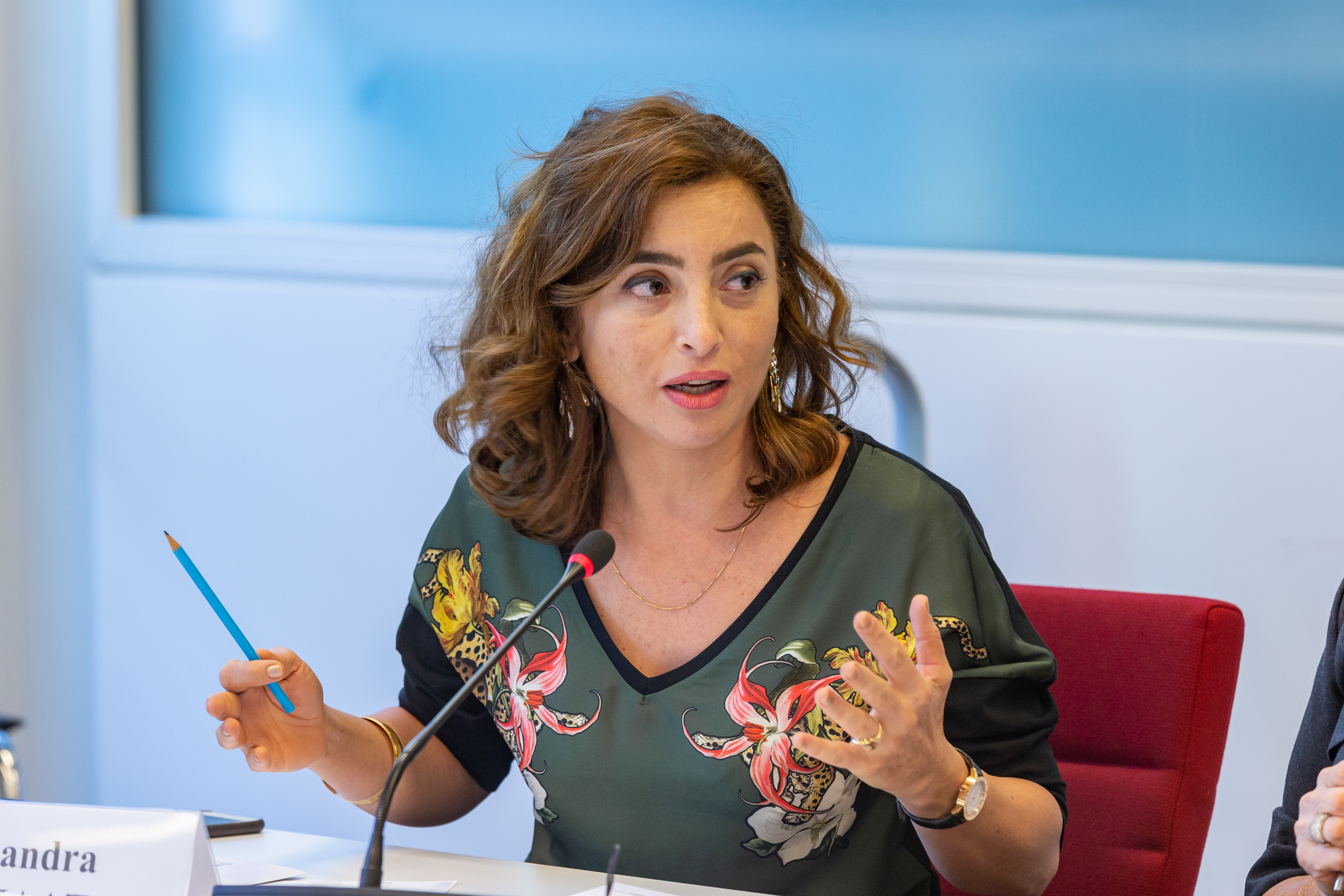
- Sandra Nashaat in 2018
- Born: 2 February 1970 (age 56); Cairo, Egypt
- Occupation: Film director

Sandra Nashaat (Egyptian Arabic: ساندرا نشأت; born 2 February 1970) is an Egyptian film director.

== Biography ==
Nashaat was born in 1970 in Cairo, Egypt to a Syrian father and a Lebanese mother. She is a Coptic Catholic. Nashaat attended Cairo's Higher Film Institute alongside Cairo University where she studied French Literature. She has made several long feature films in recent years, all of which were box office successes.

== Filmography ==
- Akhir Shita (Last Winter. Short film released in 1992)
- Al-Mufiola (The Editing Table. Short film released in 1994)
- Mabruk wa Bulbul (Mabruk and Bulbul. Released in 1998)
- Leh Khaletny Ahebak (Why did you make me love you? Released in 2000) starring Karim Abdel aziz, Mona Zaki, Hala Shiha and Ahmed Helmi
- Haramia Fe KG 2 (Thieves in Kindergarten. Released in 2001) starring Karim Abdel aziz, Hanan Turk, Maged Elkedwani and Talaat Zakaria
- Haramia Fe Thailand (Thieves in Thailand. Released in 2003) starring Karim Abdelaziz, Hanan Turk, Maged Elkedwani, Talaat Zakaria and Lotfi Labib
- Mallaki Iskandariya (Alexandria Private. Released in 2005) starring Ahmed Ezz, Nour, Ghada Adel, Khaled Salah, Mohamed Ragab and Reham Abdelghafour.
- El Rahena (The Hostage. Released in 2007), starring Ahmed Ezz, Noor, Yasmin Abdelaziz, Salah Abdalah and Mohamed Sharaf
- Masgoon Tranzeet (Released in 2008)
- The Deal (Released in 2012)
- Sharak (Released in 2014)
- Bahlam (Released in 2014)
