= El-Limby =

- Directed by: Wael Ihsan
- Written by: Ahmed Abdullah
- Produced by: Ahmed El Sobky and Mohamed El Sobky
- Starring: Mohamed Saad, Hasan Hosni, Hala Shiha, and Abla Kamel
- Music by: Hussein al-Imam
- Release date: October 8, 2002
- Country: Egypt
- Language: Arabic

El-Limby Arabic: اللمبي is an Egyptian comedy movie that hit the theaters in 2002, starring the stars of Arabic cinema Mohamed Saad that played the role of a husband called El-Limby, Hasan Hosni, Hala Shiha, and Abla Kamel. The movie El-Limby is considered to be a major hit in Arabic cinema as it influenced the demand for Arabic movies and made the people want more movies like it. The movie got such high reviews to the extent that astonished the producers themselves as Mohamed Saad overtook the famous actor Adel Imam.

Saad’s income sprung through the roof as the movie made him around £E 6 million equivalent to 1 million USD at the time which was an extremely high number for Arabic cinema. However, the movie received a number of bad reviews from critics for lacking a main plot and its poor quality which made the audience assume that a sequel won’t be released, but soon after El-Limby a sequel was produced by the name Elly Baly Balak as the producers made sure not to make the same mistakes that existed in the first movie, as to have a main plot and idea. With Mohamed Tharwat

== Uprise of El-Limby’s Personality ==
The idea of making the movie originally came from the part that Saad played as a minor character where he played a homeless child that was crazily funny, and his name was El-Limby. And after that the producers wanted Saad to replay that part but as a main character in the new movie.

From a different perspective, we see that the movie was a beginning of an Egyptian series that views various poor traits in the world generally and the Egyptian community specifically. All that's presented in a comedic sense as it was a way to deliver a message to the public in a nicer way.

== Plot ==
The movie starts off with a young man’s will to get into a relationship with a poor girl. And his mother, played by Abla Kamel, gets an idea to move her bike rental activities from the local neighborhood to a more touristic place where actual tourists will be able to rent her bikes. And with that, she was able to multiply her income as she managed to get her son a job. As soon as her project starts to grow, and Faransa, her character, and her son start making good money, the local police begin to confiscate their bikes while fining them. And here we see the first portrayed image of what the Egyptian government looks like where it fails to protects citizens’ work for bigger companies to take over. The mother and her son go back to square one with no job and a state worse than ever as the government also took all the profit she made. El-Limby here decides to bring back his father’s job and sell sandwiches on the streets. He doesn't hesitate to take a loan that goes up to £E20,000 to get his moving cart started, that his late father used to work on. And surprisingly, their financial state starts improving, up until the police show up again to destroy his cart and confiscate it as El-Limby falls into a terrible debt in clearing the loan that he once took. Saad’s famous personality appears here as he points a gun at the man who sued him for not paying his loan. And here we see another aspect of the Egyptian government as it did nothing but stop him from finding work instead of helping its citizens in living a life full of comfort and prosperity. The movie did not fail in showing various images of how life really is in those areas in Egypt, which gave it higher reviews. The movie ends with the neighborhood standing up for El-Limby for what he’s done for them by being kind and helpful. Finally, the movie yet portrays another local image where a dancer says that she wants to change her style of dancing from traditional to western to fit the trend and the people’s demand.

== Cast ==
- Mohamed Saad
- Hasan Hosni
- Hala Shiha
- Abla Kamel
- Hajjaj Abd-Elatheem
- Nashwa Mustafa
- Lotfy Labib

== Crew ==
Director: Wael Ihsan

Screenwriter: Ahmad Abdulla

Producer: Al-Sobky Cinema Production

Distribution: Oscar and Al-Nasr

Music Composer: Hussein al-Imam

Cinematographer: Mohsen Nasr
