= Boxing at the 1955 Mediterranean Games =

Boxing competition

- Location: Barcelona, Spain
- Dates: 15–25 July 1955

The boxing events of the 1955 Mediterranean Games were held in Barcelona, Spain.

== Medalists ==
Event	Gold	Silver	Bronze
Flyweight (–51 kg)	Salvatore Burruni (ITA)	Miguel Ceses Arnal (ESP)	Jean Guerrad (FRA)
Bantamweight (–54 kg)	Alphonse Halimi (FRA)	Giuseppe Velitti (ITA)	Juan-José Hidalgo Zamora (ESP)
Featherweight (–57 kg)	Georges Henny (FRA)	Horacio Valero Alvarez (ESP)	Rodolfo Sinacori (ITA)
Lightweight (–60 kg)	Antonio Egea Villegas (ESP)	Giacomo Di Casio (ITA)	André Iuncker (FRA)
Light Welterweight (–63.5 kg)	Hippolyte Annex (FRA)	Carlos Lopez Perez (ESP)	Teodoro Chiriaco (ITA)
Welterweight (–67 kg)	Moustafa Darwish (EGY)	Franco Scisciani (ITA)	Francisco Ortega (ESP)
Light Middleweight (–71 kg)	Mohyee El Din Elhamaki (EGY)	Vicente Ramos (ESP)	Manuel Sosa (FRA)
Middleweight (–75 kg)	Mohamed Mousa Elglaidy (EGY)	Guglielmo Paulon (ITA)	Jacques Dufreney (FRA)
Light Heavyweight (–81 kg)	Gilbert Chapron (FRA)	J. Luis Fernandez (ESP)	Ostini (ITA)
Heavyweight (+81 kg)	Mario De Persio (ITA)	Elbanhawy Hamdi (EGY)	Ramon Moncasi (ESP)

== Medal table ==
Rank	Nation	Gold	Silver	Bronze	Total
1	France (FRA)	4	0	4	8
2	Egypt (EGY)	3	1	0	4
3	Italy (ITA)	2	4	3	9
4	Spain (ESP)	1	5	3	9
Totals (4 entries)		10	10	10	30
