= Naseeby We Esmetak =

- نصيبي و قسمتك
- Written by: Amr Mahmoud Yassin
- Directed by: Ali Idrees, Attia Amin and Mustafa Fikri
- Theme music composer: Tamer Karawan
- Country of origin: Egypt
- No. of seasons: 1
- No. of episodes: 45

Production
- Producer: Ahmad AbdelAtty
- Cinematography: Ahmed Abdel Aziz
- Running time: 40 minutes

Naseeby We Esmetak (Arabic: نصيبي وقسمتك; "My Destiny And Your Fate") is an Egyptian drama series that aired on 23 January 2016 on CBC Drama, starring Egyptian star Hani Salama alongside Nicole Saba, Sherin Adel, Mai Selim and Ahmed Fahmy. Naseeby We Esmetak consists of separate episodes (every three episodes act as one unit/one story) that are unrelated to the preceding three, which are based around the 15 themes of the show that covers marital issues and societal complications; as well as how to overcome them.

The format of the series is that every theme would be covered within three episodes, trios, where the first episode would be an introduction of a certain issue, the second episode would be the climax of events and finally, the third episode would be the solution and the ending of the issue. The series follows this format to keep the audience entertained where they feel that every three episodes are a different series on their own, and if they're not interested in an issue then all they have to do is simply await the next three episodes series in which may be about a topic that interests them. There are three directors who work on the show to further create a sense of variety and creativity within each trio of episodes. The directors include Ali Idrees, Attia Amin and Mustafa Fikri. However, Ali Idrees had to draw back from directing the series as he got busy with directing the movie 'The Other Land' (البر التاني). The series was intended to be aired during the month of Ramadan 2015, but due to the withdrawal of director Ali Idrees the series was delayed till after Ramadan, and was aired in January 2016.

== Synopsis ==
Naseeby We Esmetak doesn't have a set story line due to its changing nature of having a different plot every three episodes, but the main theme of the series revolves around the relationship between a married couple and the differences that they may encounter as well as societal issues that occur nowadays. Hani Salama plays the protagonist in every episode whereas the wife and other characters involved would be swapped with different actors throughout the episodes.

== Episodes ==
The series was shot during mid February 2015 and was aired in January 2016. The series is made up of one season with 45 episodes. The names of the episodes are as follows:

1. Seven In The Morning (سبعة الصبح)
2. Seven In The Morning
3. Seven In The Morning
4. Entrance Of Summer (دخلة صيف)
5. Entrance Of Summer
6. Entrance Of Summer
7. There Was And It Finished (كان فيه و خلص)
8. There Was And It Finished
9. There Was And It Finished
10. Love In Hardship (حب في العناية)
11. Love In Hardship
12. Love In Hardship
13. Steal A Camel (اسرق جمل)
14. Steal A Camel
15. Steal A Camel
16. Carnival Of Begging (مهرجان التسول)
17. Carnival Of Begging
18. Carnival Of Begging
19. Casanova (كازانوفا)
20. Casanova
21. Casanova
22. I Live In You (بعيش فيك)
23. I Live In You
24. I Live In You
25. Hana And Sherif (هناء وشريف)
26. Hana And Sherif
27. Hana And Sherif
28. Nadeem's Rental
29. Nadeem's Rental
30. The Stupid Village (القرية الغبية)
31. The Stupid Village
32. The Stupid Village
33. Once Upon A Time There Was A Liberal (مرة واحد ليبرالي)
34. Once Upon A Time There Was A Liberal
35. Once Upon A Time There Was A Liberal
36. Thank You Oh Son Of Adam (شكرا يا بني أدمين)
37. Thank You Oh Son Of Adam
38. Thank You Oh Son Of Adam
39. The Criminal After Two Days (الجاني بعد يومين)
40. The Criminal After Two Days
41. The Criminal After Two Days
42. Badr In His Completeness ( بدر في تمامه)
43. Badr In His Completeness
44. Badr In His Completeness

== Timings ==
Show	Timings
CBC Drama	Wednesday 3/8- 8:00 pm Egy
CBC Drama	Thursday 3/9- 4:00 am Egy
CBC Drama	Thursday 3/9- 12:00 pm Egy
CBC Drama	Thursday 3/9- 8:00 pm Egy
CBC Drama	Friday 3/10- 4:00 am Egy

== Awards ==
Hani Salama has earned the award for the best actor in the series 'Naseeby We Esmetak' due to its wide success when it aired on OSN

== Cast ==
Cast
Sherine Adel
Nicole Saba
Hani Salama (main lead/in all stories)
Dorra Zarrouk
Riham Haggag ريهام حجاج
Mai Selim مي سليم
Riham Abdel Ghafour ريهام عبد الغفور
Ahmad Fahmy أحمد فهمي
Maram Kamal مرام كمال

== See also ==
- List of Egyptian television series
