= The Treasure: Truth and Imagination =

- Directed by: Sherif Arafa
- Written by: Abdul Rahim Kamal
- Starring: Mohamed Saad; Mohamed Ramadan; Hend Sabry; Ahmed Rizk; Ahmed Hatem; Amina Khalil; Ruby
- Music by: Hesham Nazih
- Production company: New Century Production
- Release date: August 31, 2017 (Egypt)
- Running time: 157 minutes
- Country: Egypt
- Language: Egyptian Arabic

The Treasure: Truth and Imagination (also known as Al Kenz: Al Haqiqa Wa Al Khayaal) is a 2017 Egyptian film that spans across three distinct eras: the Pharaonic era, the Mamluk era, and the first half of the 20th century. The film is directed by Sherif Arafa, written by Abdel Rahim Kamal, and produced by Walid Sabry, and stars Mohamed Saad, Mohamed Ramadan, Hend Sabry, Ahmed Rizk, Ahmed Hatem, Amina Khalil, and Ruby.

== Plot ==
In 1975, Hassan Bishr decided to return from Europe after studying Egyptology to the family home in Luxor. He discovered that his father had left him a recorded will in which he narrated many details of his life. He also left him papyri dating back to the reign of Queen Hatshepsut, and handwritten notes attributed to him. For the hero, Ali Al-Zaybak, the events range from the Pharaonic era, the Ottoman era, and the first half of the twentieth century during the rule of King Farouk, as Hassan searches through all of this for what his father left for him.

== Cast ==
- Mohamed Saad as Beshr Al Katatni
- Mohamed Ramadan as Ali Al-Zibq
- Hend Sabry as Hatshepsut
- Amina Khalil as Naemat
- Ahmed Hatem
- Haitham Ahmed Zaki as Mostafa
- Sawsan Badr
- Hany Adel
- Ruby as Zainab
- Ahmed Amin
- Mohi Ismail
- Mohamed Mahmoud Abdel Aziz
- Abdelaziz Makhyoun
- El-Shahat Mabrouk
- Ahmad Seyam
- Abbas Abul-Hassan as Salah Elkalby
- Tamim Abdo
- Mahmoud El Lozy
- Abeer Farouq
- Ahmed Rizq as Abdel Aziz
- Noha Abdeen
- Ramsi Lehner as Thutmose II
- Gamil Barsoum

== Sequel ==
A sequel, The Treasure 2: Love and Destiny, directed by Sherif Arafa, and written by Abdel Rahim Kamal, was released in 2019. it stars Mohamed Saad, Mohamed Ramadan, Hend Sabry, Ahmed Rizk, Ahmed Hatem, Haitham Ahmed Zaki, and Amina Khalil, Ruby and Hani Adel. The film was released on Eid Al Adha 2019 The second part continues where the first part ended in the stories of Hatshepsut in the Pharaonic era and Ali al-Zaybak during the Ottoman era, and Bisher al-Katatni, the head of the political pen, who faces new challenges in work and love, and tries to show his son Hassan the way to the treasure.
