= Talaat Zakaria =

Egyptian actor (1960–2019)

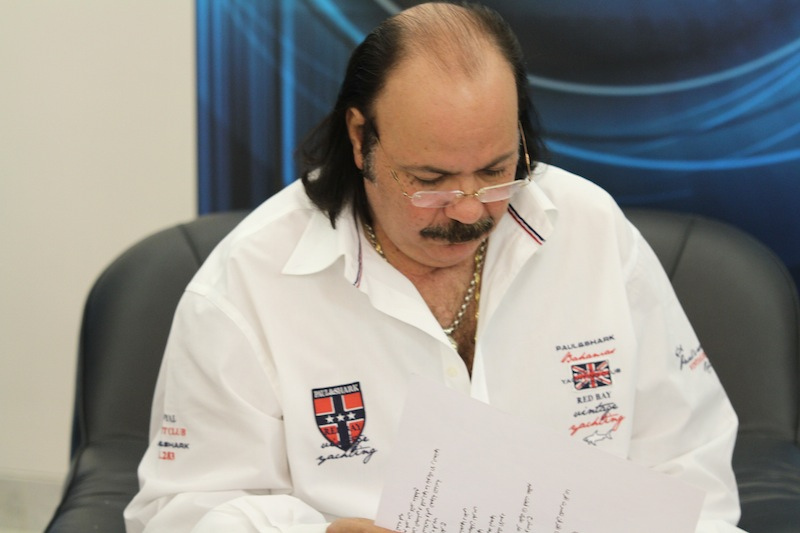
- Zakaria in 2010
- Born: Talaat Zakaria Mohamed Youssef; 18 December 1960; Alexandria, Egypt
- Died: 8 October 2019 (aged 58); Cairo, Egypt
- Education: The Higher Institute of Dramatic Art of Egypt
- Occupation: Actor

Talaat Zakaria (Arabic: طلعت زكريا; was an Egyptian actor who was well known for his comedy roles.

== Biography ==
In 2005, Talaat Zakaria earned his breakthrough when he played his first leading role in the film Haha w Tofaha, alongside Egyptian actress Yasmin Abdulaziz The film marked his transition from supporting roles to becoming a comedic leading man in Egyptian cinema.

Throughout his career, he appeared in numerous films that left an impression on Egyptian audiences, including Sayyad Al-Yamam, Sayed Al-Atefi, Abu Ali, Mr. Abu Arabi Wasl, Harim Karim, El-Feel Fil Mandeel, Tabbakh El-Raes, and Ew’a Weshak. He also worked alongside some of Egypt’s biggest stars, including Adel Imam and Samir Ghanem.

Zakaria became particularly known for his comedic performances, with roles in El-Feel Fil Mandeel, Haha w Tofaha, Tabbakh El-Raes, Harim Karim, Ghabi Meno Feh, Abu Ali, Oukal, and El-Tagroba El-Danemarkia. Many of his performances remain recognizable to Egyptian audiences, with clips and quotes from his work continuing to circulate on social media.

Zakaria died on 8 October 2019 from an inflammation of the brain at age 58.

== Filmography ==
Year	Movie	Role
	Al-Ragol ul-Abiad al-Motawaset	Police Officer
	Walla fi Elniya Ab'a	Police Officer
2001	Ga'ana alBayan Eltaly	Affifi
2002	Haramiyya fi KG2	Sibae’i
2003	Kalem Mama	Meligy
2003	Al-Tagroba Al-Danemarkeya	Police Officer
2003	"Haramiyyah fi Tayland	
2004	Ew'a weshak	Hassan
2004	Ghabi meno fih	Nossa
2004	Owkal	
2005	Abu Ali	Amin
2005	Abu Al-Arabi	Shampo
2005	Haha w Tofaha	Haha
2005	Sayed El Atefy	Friend of Sayed
2005	Harim Karim	Talaat
2006	Kalam fil Hob	Hassan
2006	Qesset ilhai ilshaaby	Mansor
2008	Tabakh El Rayyes	Metwali
2009	Sayyad Elyamam	Farag
2011	Elfeel Fil Mandeel	Saied Harakat

== Television ==
Year	Show	Role
2007	Mabrok Galak Ala'	Police Officer
2007-2015	Super Henedy	Talaat (voice)
2010	Mn Ghir Ma'ad	
2013	El Arraf	

== Theatre ==
- Du Re Me Fasolia
- El-Boubou
- War'a kol Magnon Emra'a
- Kahyon Rabah Mellion
- Sokar hanem
- We Ba'deen?
