= Youssef Maaty =

Egyptian screenwriter and playwright

- يوسف معاطي
- Born: August 25, 1963 (age 63); Suez, Egypt
- Education: Cairo Higher Institute of Cinema
- Occupations: Satirist and screenwriter
- Notable work: Amir El Behar, 365 Days of Happiness, Hassan wa Marcus, The President's Chef
- Spouse: Mona El Sharkawy
- Children: Haya Youssef Maaty, Mahmoud Youssef Maaty
- Relatives: Salah Maaty (brother)

Youssef Maaty (/mʿāṭī/ Arabic:يوسف معاطي); born August 25, 1963) is an Egyptian satirist, playwright, and screenwriter, and sibling of the author Salah Maaty. He graduated from Ain Sham University and wrote over 18 books, 17 movies, 19 TV series, and 6 plays.

== Education and career ==
- He graduated from Faculty of Al-Alsun, Ain Shams University and the Directing Department at High Cinema Institute, Cairo, Egypt.
- He began his career while studying in university by directing screenplays, during which he introduced himself as a director of schoolwork. He was requested to write a play by George Sidhom’s brother, which led to the making of the play "Love in the Cell" and becoming a screenwriter.
- His plays include: "Beauty and the Bads", "Bahlool in Istanbul", "Body Guard", "No Not Like That", and "Something in Sabry".
- He met and became associated with Adel Emam in many works including: "Mahrous the Minister's Server", "Bobbos", "The Embassy in the Building", "The Danish Experience", "Hassan and Marcus", "A Groom from a Security Entity", "Morgan Ahmed Morgan".
- Movies he wrote include: "The President's Chef", "Sorry We Are Screwed", "Ramadan Mabrouk Abul-Alamein Hamouda", "Prince of the Seas", "The Female and the Wasp", and "365 Days of Happiness".
- His TV works include: "He Nurtures in His Might", "The Helali Rail", "It's Time", "White Abbas in the Black Day", "Naji Attallah's Squad", "The Oracle", "The Owner of Happiness", "Professor and Head of Department", "Mamoun and His Partners", and "Adly Alam's Genies".
- He has written many books within satirical literature including: "Ask an Experienced", "Change Son", "Oh.. My Brain", "You Love Hate America", "Stars in the Early Afternoon", "I Don't Write, I Ponder", "Creative by Heredity", "Popped in My Head", "Daughter of the What", "Don't Take to Heart", "Life's Lost My Homeland", "Don't Worry", "Girls' Honey", and "Funny Nightmares".

== Personal life ==
- Married to the Egyptian TV presenter Mona El Sharkawy, with two children.

== Works ==
=== Novels ===
- “Ask an Experienced” (original title: ʾEsʾal Mujarreb)
- “Change Son” (original title: Ghaīyer Ya Bunaī)
- “Oh.. My Brain” (original title: Āh.. Ya Demāghy)
- “You Love Hate America” (original title: Tuḥebb Takrah ʾAmrīka)
- “Stars in the Early Afternoon” (original title: Nujūm Fī ʿEz al-Ẓuhr)
- “I Don't Write, I Ponder” (original title: ʾAna La ʾAktub wa-Lākenny ʾAtaʾammal)
- “Creative by Heredity” (original title: Ṣāyeʿ w-el-Werāthah)
- “Popped in My Head” (original title: Ṭaqqet Fī Demāghy)
- “Daughter of the What” (original title: Bent el-ʾEh)
- “Don't Take to Heart” (original title: Ma Tshelsh Fī Nafsak)
- “Life's Lost My Homeland” (original title: Wa-Ḍāʿa al-ʿOmru Ya Waṭany)
- “Don't Worry” (original title: Wa La Yhemmak)
- “Girls' Honey” (original title: ʿAsal al-Banāt)
- "Funny Nightmares" (original title: Kawābīs Mudḥekah)
- "Disturbing Talk" (original title: Kalām ʾAbīḥ Jeddan)
- "We'll Live Like This and Die Like This" (original title: Ḥanʿīsh Keda wa-Namūt Keda)
- "Genies" (original title: ʿAfārīt)
- "We Got Trapped" (original title: Laqad Waqaʿna Fī al-Fakhkh)

=== Movies ===
- 1994: "You Love or Rise" (original title: Ya Tḥebb Ya Tʾebb)
- 1997: "We Will Love and Rise" (original title: Ḥanḥebb wa-Nʾebb)
- 1998: "The Female and the Wasp" (original title: Al-Untha wa-Al-Dabbūr)
- 1999: "Mahrous the Minister's Server" (original title: El-Wād Maḥrūs Betāʿ El-Wazīr)
- 2003: "The Danish Experience" (original title: Al-Tajrubah Al-Denmārkīyah)
- 2004: "A Groom from a Security Entity" (original title: ʿArīs min Jeha Amnīyah)
- 2005: "Sorry We Are Screwed" (original title: Maʿlesh Eḥna Benetbahdel)
- 2005: "The Embassy in the Building" (original title: El-Safārah Fī El-ʿEmārah)
- 2007: "Morgan Ahmed Morgan"
- 2008: "The President's Chef" (original title: Ṭabbākh Al-Rayyes)
- 2008: "Ramadan Mabrouk Abul-Alamein Hamouda" (original title: Ramaḍān Mabrūk Abu el-ʿAlamayn Ḥammūdah)
- 2008: "Hassan and Marcus" (original title: Ḥasan wa Morqoṣ)
- 2009: "Bobbos"
- 2009: "Prince of the Seas" (original title: Amīr al-Behār)
- 2010: "The Three Deceive Her" (original title: Al-Thalāthah Yashtaghalūnaha)
- 2011: "365 Days of Happiness" (original title: 365 ʾAyyām Saʿādah)
- 2012: "My Horrible Grandma" (original title: Taytah Rahībah)

=== Series ===
- 1997: "TV in My House" (original title: Telfezyūn Fī Bayty)
- 1998: "Relaxed Youth" (original title: Shabāb Rayeq Jeddan)
- 1999: "Crazy Youth" (original title: Shabāb Ṭāqeq Jeddan)
- 2003: "Adham and Zeinat and Three Girls" (original title: ʾAdham wa-Zīnāt wa-Thalāth Banāt)
- 2004: "White Abbas in the Black Day" (original title: ʿAbbās al-ʾAbyad Fī al-Yawm al-ʾAswad)
- 2006: "Che Toto Restaurant" (original title: Al-Maṭʿam Tshy Toto)
- 2006: "The Helali Rail" (original title: Sekket al-Helaly)
- 2006: "It's Time" (original title: Ān al-ʾAwān)
- 2007: "He Nurtures in His Might" (original title: Yetrabba Fī ʿEzzū)
- 2010: "Mom in the Department" (original title: Māma Fī Al-Qesm)
- 2011: "Misyou Ramadan Mabrouk Abul-Alamein Hamouda" (original title: Mesyū Ramaḍān Mabrūk Abu el-ʿAlamayn Ḥammūdah)
- 2012: "Naji Attallah's Squad" (original title: Ferqat Najy ʿAṭallah)
- 2013: "The Oracle" (original title: Al-ʿArrāf)
- 2014: "The Owner of Happiness" (original title: Ṣāḥeb Al-Saʿādah)
- 2015: "Professor and Head of Department" (original title: Ustādh wa-Raʾīs Qesm)
- 2016: "Mamoun and His Partners" (original title: Maʾmūn wa-Shurkāh)
- 2017: "Adly Alamʾs Genies" (original title: ʿAfarīt ʿAdly ʿAlām)
- 2017: "How's the Health" (original title: ʾEzzaīy el-Ṣeḥḥah)

=== Plays ===
- 1994: "Love in the Cell" (original title: Ḥob Fī Al-Tkhshībah)
- 1995: "Bahlool in Istanbul" (original title: Bahlūl Fī Istanbūl)
- 1996: "Beauty and the Bads" (original title: al-Jamīlah wa-Al-Weḥshīn)
- 1997: "No Not Like That" (original title: Laʾa Balāsh Keda)
- 1998: "Bobby Guard"
- 1999: "Body Guard"
- 2002: "Something in Sabry" (original title: Shayʾ Fī Ṣabry)
