= Hassan Hosny =

Egyptian actor and comedian (1936–2020)

- حسن حسني
- Born: June 19, 1936; Cairo, Egypt
- Died: May 30, 2020 (aged 83); Dar Al Fouad, Cairo, Egypt
- Occupation: Actor
- Years active: 1961–2020
- Spouse: Magda Himaida
- Children: 3

Hassan Hosny (Arabic: حسن حسني) (June 19, 1936 – May 30, 2020) was an Egyptian actor and comedian. Widely regarded as a veteran of Egyptian cinema, his acting career spanned over 50 years and included performances in almost 500 films, television programs and theatre plays. He has been referred to as the Joker of Egyptian cinema.

== Biography ==
Hassan Hosny was born in the citadel district of Cairo on June 19, 1936.Tarek El Shennawi mentioned in his book "Hassan Hosny Al Meshakhasaty" that Hassan Hosny was born on June 19, 1936, yet several other sources mistakenly reported that he was born on October 15, 1931.}} Born to an entrepreneur father named Hosny, he lost his mother when he was six years old. Described as a thespian during his school years, Hassan Hosny started acting in the 1960s in theatre plays as part of the Egyptian military's theatrical group. At the beginning of his career, Hosny appeared in minor roles in several films, including La Wakt Lel Hob (No Time for Love) in 1963 and Bent el-Heta (Neighborhood’s Girl) in 1964.

The 1970s brought new opportunities for Hosny, as he appeared in numerous films, including Sook el-Hareem (Females’ Market), Hob Wa Kebreya’a (Love and Pride), Madinat el-Samt (City of Silence), among others.

His breakthrough role came when he starred as a corrupt civil servant in the popular TV show 'My Dear Children, Thank You'. He then collaborated in major TV shows with superstars Faten Hamama, Salah Zulfikar and Farid Shawqi. Popularly known for his comedic style, he also established himself as a serious actor in dramas. During the 1980s, Hosny continued to appear in successful films, including Sawa’a el-Otobees (The Bus Driver), directed by Atef El-Tayeb. His performance in the film further established him as a talented actor and marked a significant turning point in his career, particularly by highlighting his ability to portray villainous characters convincingly.

Hosny continued his collaboration with El-Tayeb in several films, including El-Bare’e (The Innocent) in 1985 and El-Horoob (The Getaway) in 1991. Throughout his career, he also worked with numerous prominent Egyptian directors, including Mohamed Khan, Osama Fawzy, and Dawood Abdel Sayed.

He married Magda in 1995, and they together had three daughters and a son. One of his daughters died of lymphoma.

During the 2000s, Hassan Hosny achieved further success as a veteran comedian, taking on increasingly significant roles in films.

Hosny was cast in famous egyption movies such as El Basha Telmiz, Ahlam Al-Fata Al-Tayesh, Bobbos, Askar Fi El-Mu’askar, Ya Ana Ya Khalty, Bouha, Ga3alatny Mogreman, Katkout, El nazer, Africano, El lembi, Ghabi Minno Fih, Zaki Chan, Abood Ala el-Hodood" (Abood on The Border), Sarek El Farah, Al Masateel and many others. Hosny’s strong sense of humor established him as one of the most prominent comedic actors in Egyptian cinema over the last two decades. His theatrical career also includes several highly successful plays, such as Hazemny Ya and Tara’eo, among others.

In the 2018 Cairo International Film Festival, he was awarded the Faten Hamama award in recognition of his lifetime achievements and contribution to Egyptian cinema. At the ceremony, Hosny commented that he was extremely happy to accept the award while he was still alive.

== Death ==
Hassan Hosny died on May 30, 2020, due to a sudden heart attack. He was buried in his family's cemetery outside Cairo. His last performance was in Sultana of Al Moez which aired during Ramadan in the same month.

== Filmography ==
Film Performances
Year	Title	Role	Notes
1964	The Next-Door Girl		
1969	Women's Market		
1975	Karnak Café	Waiter	
1980	Long Days		
1982	Qahwet al Mawardy	Ghubashi	
1982	Sawak al-Utubis		
1986	Naassaf Lehaza Al Khataa	Shafiq	
1986	Adieu mon fils		
1986	Al Baree'	Faheem	
1987	El Badroon	Sheikh Qaysoon	
1987	The Wife of an Important Man	Minister of Interior Assistant	
1989	El Zalem Wel Mazloom	Ibrahim Al Noss	
1989	Grandsons Conflict		
1991	Abu Kartonah	Mahran Beh	
1991	Al Masateel	Talaat	
1991	Al Feraa 12		
1992	El Haggama		
1992	Demaa Ala Al Esfelt	Kamal Nor Al Hassan	
1992	Fatheya and the Mercedes		
1992	Al-Qatila		
1993	Fares al-madina	Abdulazim Al Qurunfulli	
1993	Lieah ya banafsieg		
1993	A Citizen Under Investigation	Murad Mansour	
1994	Sarek al-farah	Rokba	
1995	Bakhit and Adeela		
1996	Meet Ful		
1996	Afarit el-asphalt		
1996	Nasser 56	Hamed	
1997	Woman and Five Men	The First Man	
1997	Afreet El Nahar	Mazhar	
1997	Bakhit and Adeela 2		Cameo role
1997	Al Batal		
1999	Aboud on the Boarder	Abdo	
1999	El-Farah	Mansour	
2000	The Headmaster	Sayed	
2001	Africano	Shakir	
2001	A Marriage by Presidential Decree		
2001	Son of Wealth		
2002	Adams Way		
2002	Sehr El Oyoun	Shamardal	
2002	El-Limby	Bakhr	
2002	Divorce Attorney	Dad	
2003	Qalb jari'		
2003	Mido mashakel	Saber Aref	
2003	Kallem mama		
2003	Askar fi el-mu'askar	Hasanien	
2003	Elly baly balak	Adham	
2004	First Year Con	Hassan	
2004	El basha telmiz	General Azmy	
2004	The Best of Times	Salma's father	
2004	Okal		
2004	Ghabi mino fih	Dhabsh	
2004	Khali min al colestrol		
2005	Zaki Chan	Salem Al Asyouty	
2005	Farhan melazem adem		
2005	Hamada yelab	Elsayed ahmad abd elsalam	
2005	Either Me or My Auntie		
2005	Booha	Farag	
2005	Eial Habeba		
2005	Dars khososy	Shehata	
2005	Laylat Seqout Baghdad	Shaker	
2005	Gai Fel Saree		
2006	Haha we tofaha		
2006	Al-ghawas		
2006	Lakhmet ras	Saber	
2006	She Made Me a Criminal	Adham El Shazly	
2006	Katkout	Kamel	
2006	Ayazon	Sayed Abo Ghaly	
2007	Rash Boy Dreams	Farid	
2007	Karkar	Asem	
2007	Lion & Four Cats		
2007	Kharej ala el kanoun	Sayed	
2008	Doctor Silicon	Doctor Silicon	Lead role
2008	Boushkash		
2008	H Dabor	Dabour	
2008	Shebh Monharef		
2008	My Sleeping Lover	Fayez	
2008	Ehna Etaabelna abl keda	Abdellatif	
2009	Bedoon Reqaba		
2009	El Farah	Shawky	
2009	Bobbos	Abdel Monsef	
2009	El Dictator	The Dictator	
2010	Sameer & Shaheer & Baheer	Shaheer	
2010	The Mysterious Man by himself	Prime Minister	
2011	Hello Cairo	Ashoor	
2011	Ibqa Qabilni		
2012	On My Dead Body	Nouh	
	The Player	Badran	
2013	My Aunt's Theory	Captain Hassan	
2013	Tom wa Jimi		
2013	Qalb el-Asad		
2013	Al Ashash	Sheik Yousef	
2014	Meraty w Zawgaty		
2015	Captain Masr	Lt. Sedki	
2015	Hayati Mebahdelah		
2015	Nom el-Talat		
2015	The Fourth Generation	Interior Minister	
2016	Dhay Fe Abu Dhabi		
2016	Under Table		
2017	Dhhayy fi Thailand		
2018	Uqdat el-Khawagah		
2018	El Badla		
2019	Coffee Egypt Stock Exchange		
2019	Khayal Maata	Khalil	Last film role.

=== Television ===
Television show performances
Year	Title	Role	Appearances
1969	Anonymous Number		Episode 5, 6
1978	How to Lose a Million Pounds	Mamdouh Abdulfattah	Episode 3
1979	Abnaie Al Aezzaa Shokran	Fathi	Episode 1
1980	Illusion and Truth	Rushdy	Episode 2, 8
1982	Detective Inspector		Episode 3, 6, 7
1987	Diplomatic Love		
1987	Le club des immortels	Ahmed	
1987	El Bashayer		Episodes 6, 8-13
1990	Raafat Al Haggan	Joseph Alazra'a	15 episodes
1992	El Mal We El Banon	Sharabi Abdulazeem Sharabi	19 episodes
1996	Abu Al Elaa 90	Younus Abu Simmana	25 episodes
1997	Alless Allazi Ohibouh	Ibrahim Al Asyouti	Episode 1
1999	Om Kulthum	Sheikh Ibrahim	9 episodes
2000	Wagh el qamar		16 episodes
2001	Al Nisaa Qadimoon	Boutros Mankerios	Episode 1
2002	Amira fi Abdeen		
2002	Ayna qalbi	Murshidy	3 episodes
2002	Al-Bahhar Mondi	Zeghdana's Father	
2003	Malak rohi	Sa'eed	
2004	Mahmoud the Egyption		
2004	Leqaa ala al hawaa	Ghareeb Badran	Episode 1
2006	Bent Benout		
2007	Critical Moments		2 episodes
2007	Imra'ah Fi Shaq Al-Ti'ban		
2010	al-A'ar	Abdulsttar Layl	Episode 1
2011	Sayein Dayein	Azmi	
2014	Super Henedi		Episode 3
2015	The Bum	Taymoor	
2018	The Godfather: Part 2	Zekry	
2018	Rahem	Bader Al Seyoufi	
2018	Al-Khawaga's Dilemma		

=== Theater ===
- When father sleeps
- The nightmare
- On the sidewalk
- El wad Shatara
- Walnut and almond
- Afrotto
- Wives of Hala
- The House of the Late
- Beautiful explosion
- Mind you crazy
- Endurance in the hands of my mother-in-law
- Hold me tight
- Me, her and the Computer
- The Hanim's car
- Girls Marriage
- Sons of Raya and Sakina
- Extra sugar
- Cinderella and praise
- Nonsense
- Cream and honey
- Tarzan
- Red love
- The swing
- Foolish
- Musaylimah the liar
- Game of Love
- The Bomb of the Season
- Hiran dumps
