= Sayed the Romantic =

2005 film

- Sayed El Atefy
- Directed by: Ali Ragab
- Written by: Belal Fadl
- Produced by: El-Sobki Film Production
- Starring: Tamer Hosny, Abla Kamel, Nour, Zeina, Talaat Zakaria
- Production company: El-Sobki Film Production
- Distributed by: Al Arabia Cinema Production & Distribution
- Release date: 7 June 2005
- Country: Egypt
- Language: Arabic

Sayed El Atefy (Arabic: سيد العاطفي; English: Sayed the Romantic) is an Egyptian film about a simple woman called Um Sayed (Abla Kamel) who raises her son after his father died. She works as a taxi driver, and a car picks up to face life's burdens. At the same time, she loves the Al-Ahli Team so much and sponsors her son Sayed (Tamer Hosny), who is facing several problems at the university with his uncle. Um Sayed and friends try to lift the injustice done to her son in the comic-style concert.

== Sources ==
- Shaheen, Amr (24 July 2005). "Egyptian rivalry on film". BBC News.
