= Thieves in KG2 =

- Theatrical release poster
- Directed by: Sandra Nashaat
- Screenplay by: Belal Fadl
- Starring: Karim Abdel Aziz
- Cinematography: Ihab Mohammed Ali
- Edited by: Mona Rabie
- Music by: Hesham Nazih
- Production company: Dollar Film
- Distributed by: Oscar Film Distribution
- Release date: 21 February 2001 (Egypt)
- Running time: 110 minutes
- Country: Egypt
- Language: Egyptian Arabic
- Box office: $3.2 million

Thieves in KG2 (Arabic: حرامية في كي جي تو, Haramiyya fi KG2; "Thieves in Kindergarten") is a 2001 Egyptian comedy, drama film directed by Sandra Nashaat, with the screenplay written by Belal Fadl.

== Plot ==
Two thieves, Hasan and Sibae’i, plan to rob the safe in the Kaitby Fortress in Alexandria, but the police capture Sibae’i, who asks Hasan to take care of Nesma, his daughter; if he does this, Sibae’i will not say that Hasan conspired in the robbery attempt. Hasan meets Nasma's teacher, Miss Reem, and the two become romantically involved. Miss Reem does not know of Hasan's history. The film's story settings are Cairo, Alexandria, Port Said, Luxor, and Aswan.

== Cast ==
- Karim Abdel Aziz - Hasan
- Talaat Zakaria - Sibae’i
- Maha Ammar - Nasma
- Hanan Tork - Miss Reem
- Nashwa Mustafa as Etidal
- Maged el-Kedwany
- Ragaa Al Geddawi
- Sami Maghawri

== Reception ==
After Eid al-Adha the film screened at 30 cinemas in Cairo and other Egyptian cities. Fewer than three months after its release, the film generated over E£10 million in revenues at the Egyptian box office, where it was the highest performing film in that period.

Nur Elmessiri of Al Ahram Weekly wrote that "Egypt has proven that it is capable of producing the cool-cute male, the attractive-cute female and the sassy/bratty-but-cute child, all recognisable members of global pop culture."

== See also ==
- Cinema of Egypt
- Thieves in Thailand
