= Moustafa Darwish =

Egyptian actor (1980–2023)

- مصطفى درويش
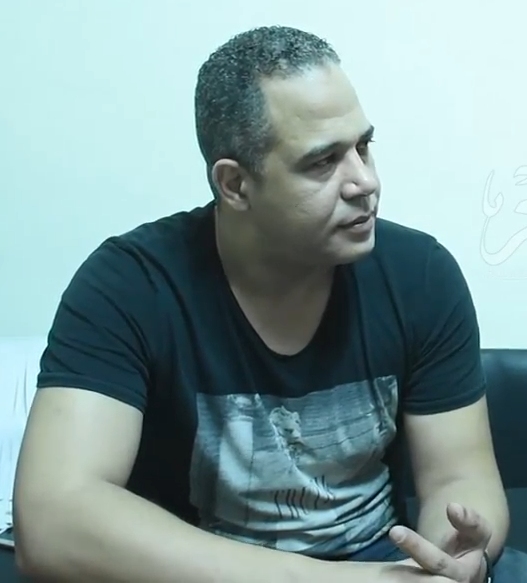
- Darwish in 2017
- Born: Moustafa Husein Darwish; 11 January 1980; 6th of October City, Egypt
- Died: 1 May 2023 (aged 43); Egypt
- Occupation: Actor
- Years active: 2011–2023

Mustafa Darwish or Mustafa Hussein Darwish, (11 January 1980 – 1 May 2023) was an Egyptian actor who appeared in film and television dramas.

== Personal life and death ==
On 12 June 2020, Darwish announced that he was experiencing symptoms of COVID-19.

Darwish died on 1 May 2023, at the age of 43.

== Filmography ==
The following are some of Mustafa Darwish's works:

Work	Role	Year of Release
Kaf Alqamar (Movie)	Police Officer	2011
Foq Mostawa El Shobohat (Series)	Lawyer Fouad	2016
Elli Ekhtasho Mato		2016
Le Aa'la Se'r (Series)	Lawyer Bakr	2017
Karma (Movie)	Ramzi	2018
Ded Maghool (Series)		2018
Ayub (Series)	Radhy Shaboura - Guest of Honor	2018
Abo Omar El-Masry (Series)		2018
Naseeby We Esmetak 3 (Series)		2018
Hekaity (Series)	Guest of Honor	2019
Baraka (Series)	Yaser El Ashmawy	2019
Abu Jabal (Series)	Emad	2019
Kheyanet Ahd (Series)	Ezzat	2020
Bi 100 Wish	Fathi	2020
Qut Al-Qulob		2020
Except Me		2020
It's All With Love	Ibrahim (Karakibo)	2021
Unbreakable	Salah El Omrai	2021
Bayn Al Sama Wa Al Ard	Dhab3	2021
Raj'een Ya Hawa	Nasr Bazar	2022
