= A Bewildered Lovebird =

- Theatrical release poster
- Arabic: بلبل حيران
- Directed by: Khalid Mar'iee
- Written by: Khalid Diab
- Produced by: Mohamed Abdel Ghany
- Starring: Ahmed Helmy; Zeina; Shery Adel; Amy Samir Ghanem
- Cinematography: Ahmed Youssef
- Music by: Hesham Nazih
- Production company: Shadows Production
- Distributed by: Shadows Production
- Release date: November 18, 2010
- Country: Egypt
- Language: Arabic

A Bewildered Lovebird (Arabic: بلبل حيران, romanized: Bolbol Hayran) is a 2010 Egyptian film.

== Plot ==
Bolbol wakes up in a full-body cast after a mysterious accident shattered every last bone in his body. He is lying in a hospital bed, where he will probably spend the next few weeks, and with him is Dr. Amal, a dedicated physician taking care of his needs. Bolbol warms up to the perky doctor and shares his story with her in painstaking detail.

As the owner of a small ad agency, he first meets Yasmin, a harmonica playing member of a rock band. At first Bolbol is smitten by her carefree attitude and lack of jealousy until the novelty wears off. Just as his fondness turns into frustration towards Yasmin, in walks Hala, a helpless girl who is in many ways the polar opposite of Yasmin.

Bolbol spends more and more time with Hala, ultimately falling for her, but at the same time he cannot shake off his love for Yasmin. Both women seem to have something that Bolbol desires, and our poor hero is torn between the two. And therein lies his predicament: should Bolbol go for the independent, self-empowered though occasionally cold Yasmin? Or is the submissive and helpless Hala a better fit for his traditionalist values, even though she can be very overbearing?

== Cast ==
- Ahmed Helmy as Bolbol
- Zeina as Yasmin
- Shery Adel as Hala
- Emy Samir Ghanem as Dr. Amal

== See also ==
- Cinema of Egypt
