= Zeina (actress) =

Egyptian actress (born 1984)

- زينة
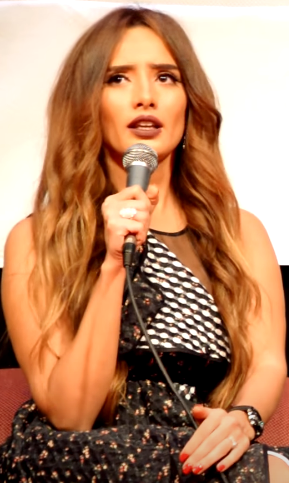
- Born: Wessam Reda Ismail Morsi; 4 February 1977 (age 49); Cairo, Egypt
- Occupation: Actress

Zeina (Arabic: زينة, IPA: [ˈzeːnæ]; born Wessam Reda Ismail Morsi, 4 February 1977) is an Egyptian actress and model. She began acting in 1995 and has since performed in many movies and television series, is known to be one of the best and most beautiful actresses in Egypt.

== Career ==
She started her career as a model in music videos by her real name Wesam. Zeina was chosen by renowned director Daoud Abdel Sayed to play the role of “Hanna in Ard El kof” (Land of Fear), her acting role. She also worked as a broadcaster in one of the channels of Arab Radio and Television. She starred in many movies and television series since her acting debut, such as “Afaryt el-Sayala” (Ghosts of Sayala) in 2004, and “El Haya fe Montana el Laza” (Joys of Life) in 2005.

The actress chose to go by Zeina as she began her acting career. She was dubbed “Sophia Loren of Arabs” by director Youssef Chahine after he saw her in “El Haya fe Montaha el Laza”, while late legendary actor Ahmed Zaki (actor) called her “Penélope Cruz” for the similarities between her and the Spanish actress.

Zeina is known for her roles in films such as “El Haya fe Montaha el Laza”, “Sayed El Atefy”, “El Sahabh”, “El gezyra”, “90 Minutes”, “Puskas”, “Trapezoid”, “Captain Hima”, “One – Zero”, and “Two Girls From Egypt”. She is also known for her roles in TV productions "Al Layla Wa Elly Feeha", “Afaryt el-Sayala”,”Hadret el Motaham Aby”, ” Li Aala Seer”, and the hit tv series “Gaafar El Omda”.

Zeina won many prizes, the most important of which was the best actress of 2005 and 2006 in the audience choice awards, she also won an award for outstanding performance for her role in The series (My Father the Defendant) with the star Nour El Sherif, and the 2013 Egyptian Film Association Award for (Two Girls from Egypt).

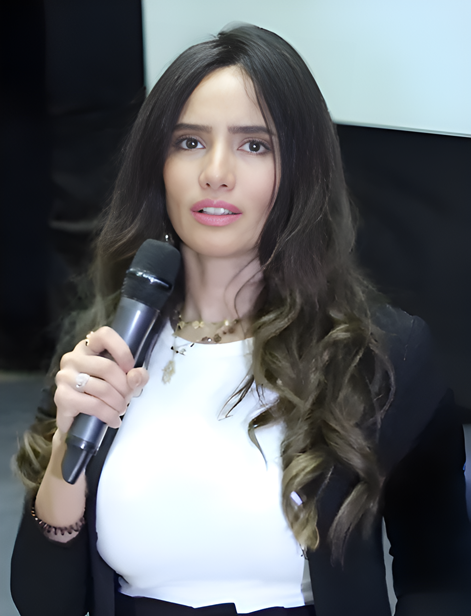
Zeina in 2020

Zeina once again teamed up with actor Bassem Samra for a new TV series El Atawla part two. It marks the third collaboration between the two stars. They previously collaborated on the 2007 smash hit film "El Gezira"(The Island) and the star-studded TV series "El Atawla."

== Personal life ==
=== Legal case ===
In January 2008 a court ruling sentenced Zeina to two months imprisonment and a fine of E£1,000 because a traffic officer and soldier claimed that Zeina had verbally assaulted them while they were issuing a traffic violation. She obtained an acquittal from the Court of Appeals in April 2008 claiming the government needed to prove its case against fraud and falsification of records by the officers concerned.

=== Marriage ===
Zeina had twin sons in October 2013. She claimed that their father is the actor Ahmed Ezz after a customary marriage. Ezz denied such allegations and asked for a DNA test to verify her claims. In 2015, Cairo family court ruled in favour of Zeina to register the boys with Ezz being the biological father after he refused to do the test. Later on, Nasr City misdemeanor court sentenced Ezz in absentia to three years in prison and levied a fine of E£15,000 on charges of libel and slander against actress Zeina.

== Filmography ==
=== Cinema ===
Films
No.	Year	Title	Role
1	1999	Ard El kof (Land of Fear)	Hana
2	2005	El Hayah Montaha El-lazza	
3	2005	Sayed El Atefy	Gehan
4	2007	El Shabah	Ahlam
5	2007	Al Gezera (The Island)	Fayka
6	2008	Boshkash	Hania
7	2008	Shebh Monharef	
8	2008	Captin Hima	Mariam
9	2009	Wahed..Sefr	Nadia
10	2010	Bentein men misr	Hanan
11	2010	El Kobar	Heba
12	2010	Bolbol Hayran	Yasmine
13	2012	Al Maslaha	Stadia
14	2015	El-Lailah El-Kabirah	Madihah
15	2018	Karma	
16	2019	The Money	Hala
17	2024	El Eskandarani	Qamar
18	2025	El Dashash	
19	2025	The girls of pasha	

=== Television ===
- Afaryt el-Sayala (Ghosts of Sayala) - 2004
- Lil-tharwah Hisabat Okhra - 2005
- Hadret El Mottaham Abi - 2006
- Ali Ya Wika - 2006
- Layali - 2009
- Ard el naam - 2015
- El waswas - 2015
- Azmet nasab - 2015
- Le A'la Se'r - 2017
- Mamno Al Eqterab Aw Al Tasweer 4 - 2018
- Jame Salem - 2020
- Kolo Bil Hob (It’s All With Love) - 2020
- What happpend that night - 2022
- Gaafar El Omda - 2023
- Deebo - 2024
- Al Atawla - 2024-2025
- Ward w Shokolata - 2025
