= Before the Summer Crowds =

- قبل زحمة الصيف
- Directed by: Mohamed Khan
- Starring: Maged El Kedwany, Hana Sheha, Ahmed Dawood, Lana Mushtaq, Hany El Metennawy
- Production companies: Rotana Studios, Rotana TV, Rotana TV & Distribution, Rotana, Rotana Film Production, Middle West Films, Film-Clinic, The Producers, WIKA Production and Distribution, MAD Solutions
- Distributed by: Rotana Studios, Rotana TV, Rotana TV & Distribution, Rotana, Rotana Film Production, MAD Solutions
- Release dates: December 2015 (Dubai International Film Festival); April 13, 2016 (Egypt)
- Running time: 89 minutes
- Country: Egypt
- Language: Arabic

Before the Summer Crowds (Arabic: قبل زحمة الصيف, translit. Qabl Zahmet El Seif) is an Egyptian film directed by Mohamed Khan and released in 2016. Starring Maged el Kedwany, Hana Sheha, Ahmed Dawood, Lana Mushtaq and Hany El Metennawy, it premiered at the 12th Dubai International Film Festival in 2015. It was then selected to represent Egypt in the 5th Luxor African Film Festival in March 2016 before commercial release in Egyptian cinemas in April and rollout to Iraq, Tunisia and the UAE in May.

== Plot ==
The film follows a group of people who meet in a beach resort on the North Coast of Egypt. Described as "a wry satire on the self-centred middle classes occupying Egypt’s “first row”" by Screen Daily, it follows Dr. Yehia (Maged el Kedwany) and his wife Magda (Lana Mushtaq) as they arrive at the beach resort. They are soon joined by Hala (Hana Sheha), a "a needy, negligent recently-divorced mother" who quickly attracts the attention of both Dr. Yehia and Goma'a (Ahmed Dawood), the resort caretaker. Over the week, each of their individual frustrations comes to a head and "the pre-summer holiday they all hoped for turns out to be yet another backdrop for the same frustrations." This is a story of accidental neighbours and frustrated voyeurs who are the recognisable bourgeoisie of the Egyptian summer.

== Cast ==
- Maged el Kedwany — Dr. Yehia
- Hana Shiha — Hala
- Ahmed Dawood — Goma'a
- Hany El Metennawy — Hisham
- Raghda Saeed — Woman at the fish market
- Hasan Abu Al Rous — Man at the fish market
- Seif Niaz — Tarek
- Niwana Gamal Affi — Malak
- Hannah Gretton — Tourist on the beach
- Tristan Thomas — Tourist on the beach
- Mohamed al Araby — Seller at the fish market
- Ali Hussein — The doorman
- Eshta — Awad
