= Abla Kamel =

Egyptian actress (born 1960)

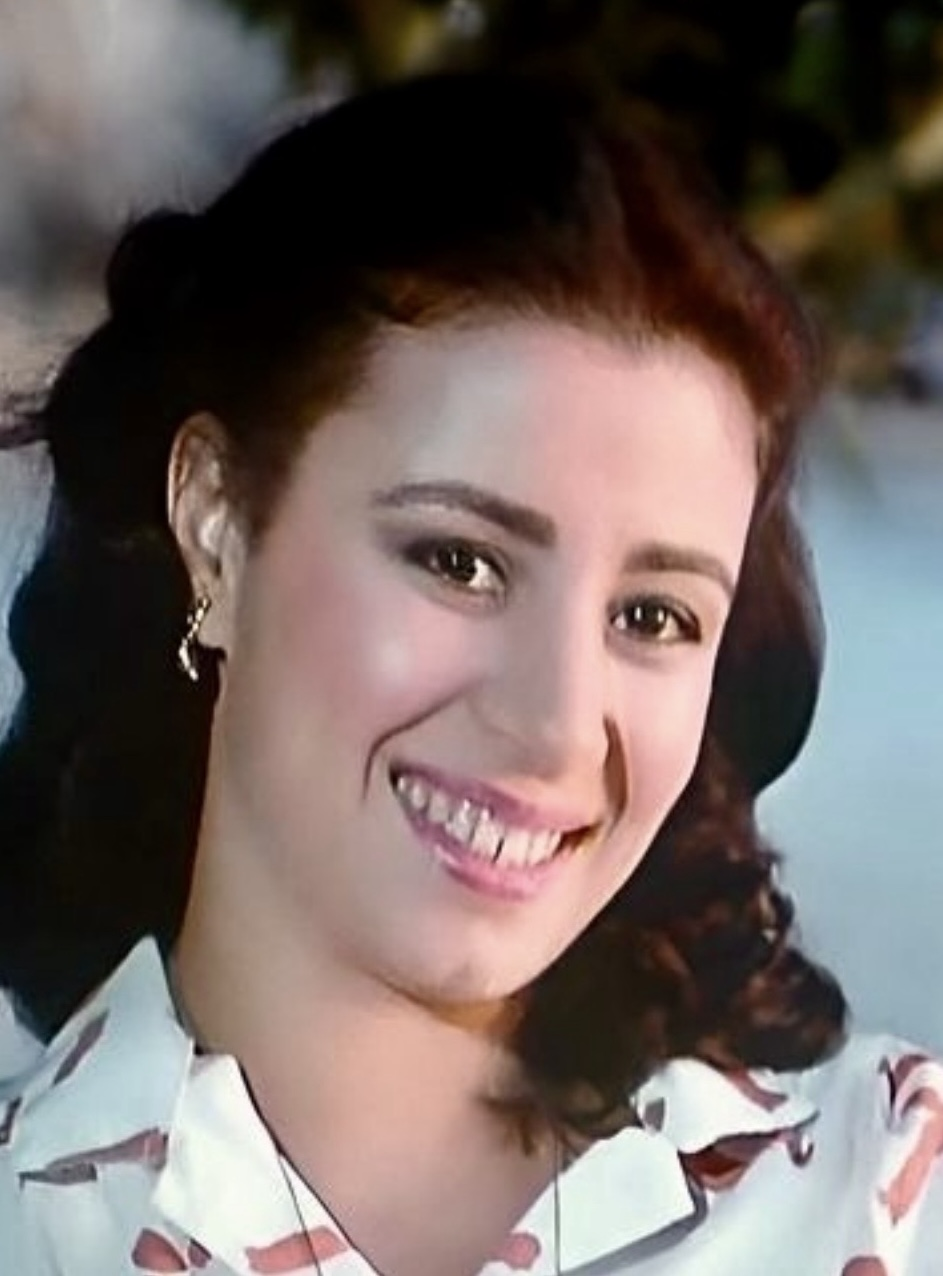
- Abla Kamel in 1985
- Born: Abla Kamel Mohamed Afifi; December 8, 1960 (age 65); Beheira Governorate, Egypt
- Occupation: Actress
- Years active: 1985–present
- Children: 2

Abla Kamel Mohamed Afifi (Arabic: عبلة كامل محمد عفيفي; pronounced [ˈʕæblæ ˈkæːmel mæˈħæmmæd ʕæˈfiːfi]) (born December 8, 1960), is an Egyptian actress and comedian.

== Biography ==
Kamel was born on 8 December 1963 Originally from Nikla Al Inab of Beheira Governorate. She graduated from the Faculty of Arts Department of Libraries in 1984 and started her career in theater Vanguard. She first participated in mono drama, heart health centers, then with Mohamed Sobhi. She married actor Ahmad Kamal, with whom she had two daughters. She later married actor Mahmoud El Gendy but were later divorced.

== Filmography ==
Year	Title	Role
1982	Iftah ya simsim (TV miniseries)	Khoka
1983	Al-Shahd wel Domouaa (1983-1985) Honey and Tears S1 and S2 (TV miniseries)	Afaf
1988	Yom mor... yom helw	
1990	Iskanderija, kaman oue kaman	
1992	Al Mal W Al Banon 1 (TV miniseries)	Ruqayya Muhammad al-Maliki
1993	Sawwaq el hanem	
1993	Mercedes	
1994	Sarek al-farah	
1996	Hysteria	
1996	Lan a3ish fi Gilbab abi (TV miniseries)	
1998	Arak el-balah	
1999	El Medina	Bannoura
2002	El-Limby	Faransa
2002	Ayna qalbi (TV miniseries)	Wesal
2003	Elly baly balak	Doctor
2003	Kallem mama	
2004	Khalty Faransa	Faranca
2004	Eish ayamak (TV miniseries)	Nahed
2005	Sayed El Atefy	Hanifa
2005	Raya wa Sekina (TV miniseries)	Raya
2006	Al-andaleeb hikayt shaab (TV miniseries)	Aliya Shabana
2010	El Kobar	Umm-Ali
2020	The Knight and the Princess	Hajjaj's Daughter
