= Mohamed Saad (actor) =

Egyptian actor and comedian (born 1968)

Mohamed Saad محمد سعد
- Born: Mohamed Saad Abdel-Hamid Ibrahim; 14 December 1968 (age 57); Giza, Giza Governorate, Egypt
- Other names: El-Limby
- Occupation: actor
- Years active: 1988–present
- Height: 1.69
- Children: 3

Mohamed Saad Abdel-Hamid Ibrahim (born 14 December 1968) (Arabic: محمد سعد عبد الحميد إبراهيم, IPA: [mæˈħæmmæd ˈsæʕd ˈæħmæd]) is an Egyptian actor active since 1988. Saad is known for comedic roles.

Saad started his career acting in several supporting roles. His first breakthrough was opposite Salah Zulfikar in Road To Eilat (1994). His second role that brought him fame was in El Nazer (2000). Then, Saad took the lead in El-Limby (2002; the name, that of Saad's character, is a play on the name of one of Egypt's colonial figures, High Commissioner Edmund Allenby). Playing the film's "illiterate, inefficient, slow, stoned and drunk" hero, Saad "invests his first leading role with a hyperactive physical energy, especially evident in dance sequences." The comedy film became one of the highest-grossing films in Egyptian cinema.

Between 2003 and 2005, Saad played similar characters in three further films, including one of his most successful movies, Ely Baly Balak.

In 2006, Saad starred in Katkout (The Chick), in which he played a hopeless Upper Egyptian who stumbles into a career as a boxer and crimefighter. Cairo online magazine Yallabina criticized the film for relying on Saad's physical comedy at the expense of story and script.

== Filmography ==
=== TV Series ===
- Wa ma zal alnayl yajri, 1992 (ar: وما زال النيل يجري) - And the Nile is still running; Bakati
- Ayam Almunira, 1994 (ar: أيام المنيرة) - Days of Almunira (district in Cairo); Zinger
- Qisat Madina, 1995 (ar: قصة مدينة) - A city story; Eliwa
- Beit El-Gamalyia, 1996 (ar: بيت الجمالية) - El-Jamalyia house
- Wa man aldhy la yuhibu Fatima, 1996 (ar: ومن الذي لا يحب فاطمة) - Who does not like Fatima?; Raafat
- Marfu' Muaqataan Min Alkhidma, 1997 (ar: مرفوع مؤقتا من الخدمة) - Temporarily out of service; Atiar
- Al-sharie Aljadid, 1997 (ar: الشارع الجديد) - The new street; Negro
- Fawazir Tayatru, 1998 (ar: فوازير تياترو); Zezo
- Al-Aiesar- 1999 (ar: الإعصار) - The Cyclone
- Fawazir Aleial Atjananat - 1999 (ar: فوازير العيال اتجننت) - Fawazir Children went crazy; Adham
- Al-Fajala, 2000 (ar: الفجالة); Khalifa
- Shams Al Ansari, 2012 (ar: شمس الأنصاري); Shams Al Ansari / Saleh Abu Kenawy
- Viva Atata, 2014 (ar: فيفا أطاطا); Oukal / Atata

=== Films ===
- Alesh Dakhal El-Gesh, 1989 (ar: عليش دخل الجيش) - Alesh entered the army
- El-Tariq Ela Eilat, 1994 (ar: الطريق إلى إيلات) - The Road to Eilat; Kenawy
- El-Gentle,1996 (ar: الجنتل) - The Gentle; Youssef El-Mahrapy Ghorab
- Emra' wa khams Rijal, 1997 (ar: امرأه وخمس رجال) - A woman and five men; Sherif
- El-Nazer, 1999 (ar: الناظر) - The Principal; El-Limby
- 55 Esaaf, 2001 (ar: إسعاف 55) - Ambulance 55; Maree
- El-Limby, 2002 (ar: اللمبى); El-Limby
- Elly Baly Balak, 2003 (ar: اللي بالي بالك) - You-know-who; El-Limby / Riyad Al-Manfaluti
- Oukal, 2004 (ar: عوكل); Oukal / Atata
- Bouha, 2005 (ar: بوحة); Bouha Al-Sabah
- Katkout, 2006 (ar: كتكوت); Katkout Abu Al-Layl / Youssef Khoury
- Karkar, 2007 (ar: كركر); Al-Hinnawi / Karkar / Rida (The son) / Rida (The daughter)
- Boshkash, 2008 (ar: بوشكاش); Boshkash Mahfouz
- El-Limby 8 Giga, 2011 (ar: اللمبى 8 جيجا); El-Limby Fathallah Aish
- Tak Tak Boom, 2011 (ar: تك تك بوم); Tika / Riyad Al-Manfaluti
- Tatah, 2013 (ar: تتح); Tatah
- Hayati Mubhdila, 2015 (ar: حياتي مبهدلة) - My life is wasted; Tatah Abdel-Hafez
- Taht Al Tarabiza, 2016 (ar: تحت الترابيزة) - Under the table; Asim Sinjari / Hanko Abdul-Rahman
- Al-Kinz, 2017 (ar: الكنز) - The treasure; Bishr Katatni
- Mohamed Hussein, 2019 (ar: محمد حسين); Mohamed Hussein
- Al-Kinz 2, 2019 (ar: 2 الكنز) - The treasure 2; Bishr Katatni
- El Dashash, 2024 (ar: الدشاش); El Dashash

== Awards ==
- The Egyptian Cinema Oscar Award in 2002 for his movie El-Limby.
- ART Award for Best Comedy Cenematic Actor in 2005 for his film Bouha.
- Dear Guest Award for Best Comedy Actor in 2014 for his series Viva Atata.
- Film Association Award for Best Actor in 2017 for his movie Al-Kinz.
- Film Critics Award for the movie Al-Kinz.
- Dear Guest Award for Best Actor for his movie Al-Kinz 2.
- Film Association Award for Best Actor in 2019 for the movie Al-Kinz 2.
- A shield of honor from Youm7, for all his cinematic, dramatic, and theatrical works.
