= Ruby (Egyptian singer) =

Egyptian singer and actress (born 1981)

Ruby روبي
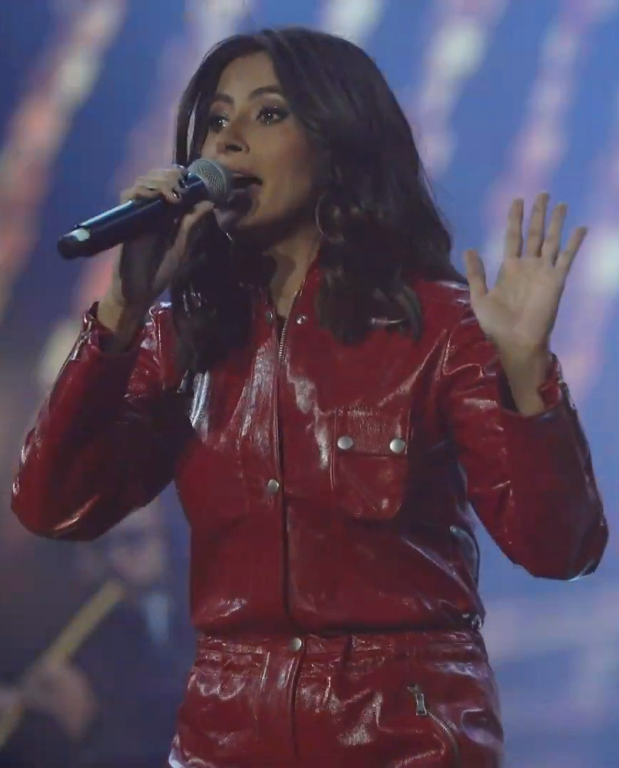
- Ruby performing in 2023

Background information
- Born: Rania Hussein Mohamed Tawfiq رانيا حسين محمد توفيق; October 8, 1981 (age 45); Cairo, Egypt
- Genres: Arabic pop, Egyptian music
- Occupations: Singer, actress
- Years active: 2001–present (actress); 2003–present (singer)
- Labels: Yellow / Delta Sound (2003–present); EMI Music Label

Rania Hussein Mohamed Tawfik (Arabic: رانيا حسين محمد توفيق [ˈɾɑnjɑ ħeˈseːn mæˈħæm.mæd tæwˈfiːʔ]; born October 8, 1981), known as Ruby (Arabic: روبي [ˈɾuːbi], sometimes transliterated as Roubi), is an Egyptian singer, actress and occasional model who rose to fame with her debut single "Enta Aref Leih" ("Do You Know Why?") in 2003.

== Biography ==
=== Earl life and career ===
Ruby was born in 1981 in a working class neighborhood of Cairo. Her roots trace back to Asyut Governorate in Upper Egypt.

At the age of 16, she was working as a model for the first time. She then starred in some TV commercials and got first roles in films. She managed to get a small role in famous director Youssef Chahine's 2001 film Silence, We're Rolling. Previously known as Rania, Chahine gave her the pseudonym Ruby.

=== Early success as a musician ===
The first music video of her debut single "Enta Aref Leih" (2003), was directed by Sherif Sabri and was a huge hit on most satellite music stations in the Middle East during the summer of 2003 and brought Ruby fame. The music video, shot in Prague, was scandalized by conservative media for Ruby appearing in a supposedly provocative costume of a belly dancer. Egyptian politician Hamdi Hassan from the Muslim Brotherhood complained about the music video in the Egyptian parliament. Ruby herself countered the controversy: "But belly dancing is part of the Egyptian tradition. In the old movies, you always saw women in those costumes."

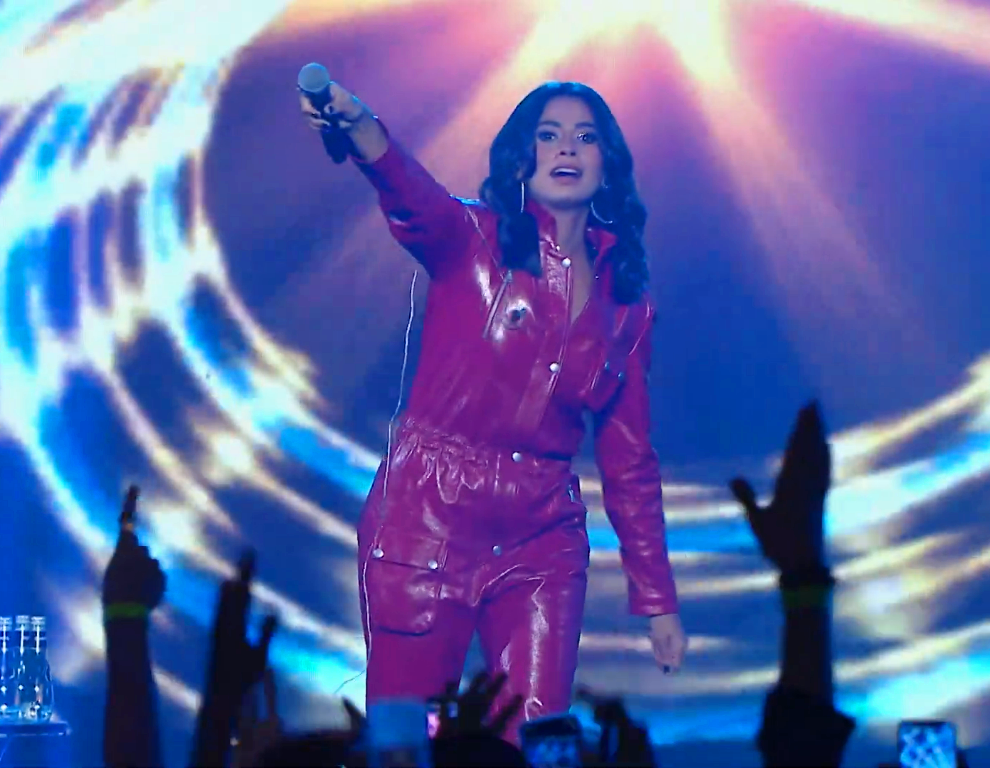
Ruby in Concert, 2023

Ruby's second video was released in early 2004. The video was titled "Leih Beydary Kedah" (Why Is He Hiding His Feelings Like This?), also directed by Sherif Sabri; the video again featured supposedly provocative scenes. Her third music video "El Gharaam (Koll Amma A'ollo Ah)" was accompanied by clips from Ruby's movie, "Saba' Wara'aat Kotcheena" (7 Playing Cards). The film was banned by the governments of some Arabic countries due to its usage of erotic themes.

Ruby was questioned in numerous interviews about her performance style supposedly contradictory to moral views at the time, to which she responded that she does not consider herself to be a sex symbol.

In 2008, she released a single Yal Ramoush (Wonderful Eyelashes). She is also the one who sang the theme song of Al Wa3d Movie Awwel Marra.

=== Hiatus in musical career and focus on acting ===
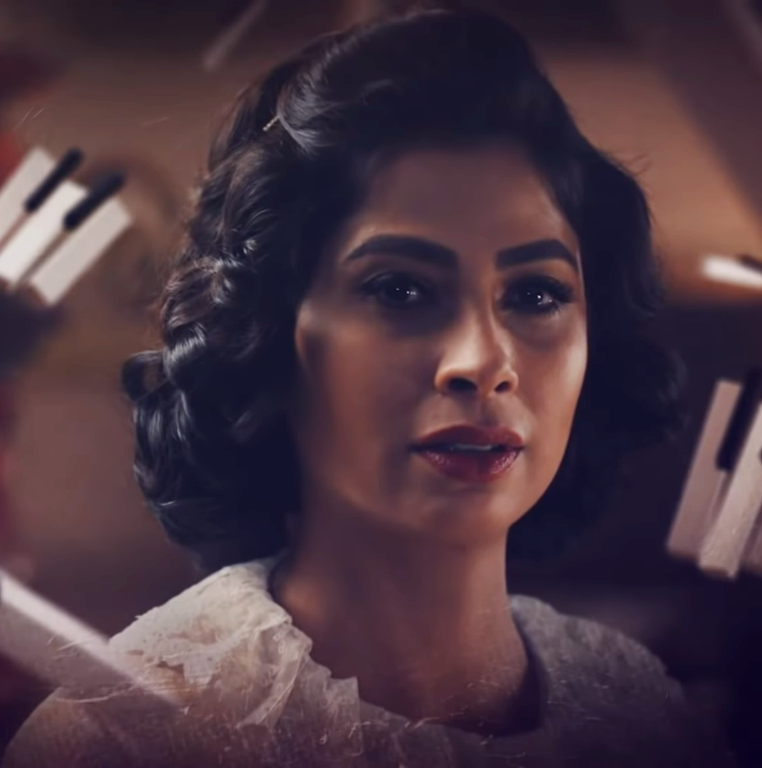
Ruby in Egyptian series Once Upon a Time

After 2008, she stopped releasing new music or giving concerts and instead focused on acting. She acted in several films and TV series and had a prominent role in the viral 2020 advertisement for Edita's Molto croissants.

In a 2016 TV interview with Isaad Younis, she explained that she stepped away from music due to her not wanting to meet expectations of producers to perform at weddings and due to her not liking the physical proximity of the audience when performing live.

=== Return to music ===
In 2021, Ruby officially returned to music with the single "Hetta Tanya", which was also the lead single from her album of the same name. Producer Walid Mansour stated in interviews that he convinced her to return to music. This song performed exceptionally well and managed to gain more than 230 million views on YouTube.

== Musical style ==
Her music since the beginnings of her career is characterized by a focus on danceability rather than the focus on dramatic and emotional tarab common in Egyptian pop music. She often uses the maqsum rhythm common in Egyptian pop. In a 2005 interview, she claimed that she is inspired by R&B music and uses the bass line as a basic for writing her music. She cited Jennifer Lopez as an influence.

== Political views ==
Ruby supported and personally joined the 2011 Egyptian revolution on Tahrir Square. In the context of elections in 2011, she stated in interviews that she would give up singing if the Muslim Brotherhood would come to power.

On her birthday on 8 October 2023, she voiced her solidarity with the Palestinian people and spoke of the October 7 attacks as a "birthday gift".

== Personal life ==
She was also rumoured to be married to her manager, Sherif Sabri, but they have both denied the rumour.

== Discography ==
=== Studio albums ===
- Eba'a Abelni (2004)
- Fein Habibi (2005)
- Meshit Wara Ehsasi (2007)
- Hetta Tanya (2021)
- Alhubu Iih (2026)

=== Singles ===
- Enta Aref Leh (2003)
- Leih Beydary Keda (2004)
- Yal Remoush (2008)
- Hetta Tanya (2021)
- Ana Laww Za'lana (2021)
- Albi Plastic (2021)
- Hetta Tanya (Harout Zadikian Remix) (2021)
- Nemt Nenna (2022)
- Mesh Maghrora (2026)

== Filmography ==
Year	Film	Translation	Notes
2000	Film Thaqafi	Cultural Film	
2001	Sekut Hansawwar	Silence, We're Rolling	
2004	Saba' Wara'at Kotshina	7 Cards	
2008	Lelet el BabyDoll	The BabyDoll Night	
2008	El Wa'd	The Promise	
2010	El Sho'	Lust	Won—Golden Pyramid Award from the 34th Cairo International Film Festival
2013	El Harami w el Abit	The Thief and the Idiot	
2013	El Haflah	The Party	
2015	Yom Maloosh Lazma	A Useless Day	
2017	El Kenz	The Treasure	
2018	Eyar Nari	Gunshot	
2019	Hamlet Far'on	Hamlet Pheroun	
2019	El Kenz 2	The Treasure 2	
2021	Bara El Manhag	Out of Syllabus	
2022	Wahed Tany	Another One	
2022	Keira w Elgen	Keira and El-Gen	
2023	Shalaby	Shalaby	
2023	Group El Mamiz	Moms Group	
