= Amina Khalil =

Egyptian actress (born 1988)

- أمينة خليل
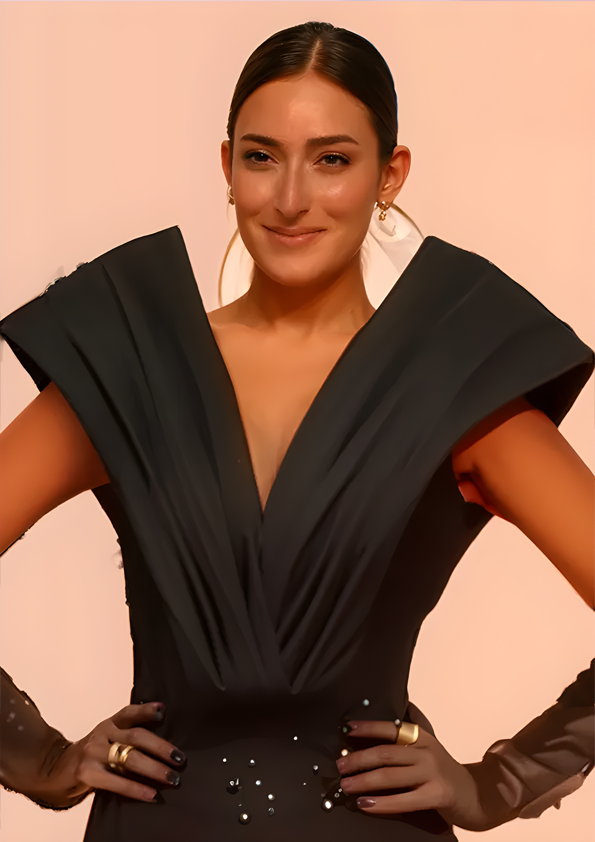
- Khalil at the 45th CIFF, 2024
- Born: October 26, 1988 (age 38); United States
- Education: The American University in Cairo (B.F.A.)
- Occupation: Actress
- Years active: 2011–present
- Spouses: Karim El Khashab (m. 2015; div. 2017): Omar Taha (engaged 2020)

Amina Khalil (Arabic: أمينة خليل; born 26 October 1988) is an Egyptian film and television actress who has gained prominence in the late 2010s and early 2020s in the Arab world. Her advocacy for female rights granted her an honorary ambassador title by The United Nations Population Fund (UPFA) in Egypt.

== Early life ==
Khalil studied acting at The American University in Cairo and graduated in 2009. She then studied at the Lee Strasberg Theatre and Film Institute in New York City. She practiced ballet from childhood to age 17.

== Career ==
Her roles in the films Asham (2012), Khetta Badeela (2015) and Sukkar Mor (2015) were critically acclaimed. Her breakout role in the 2016 television show Grand Hotel (also known as Secret of the Nile), and the 2018 TV series Layalie Eugenie (Eugenie Nights), are both on Netflix.

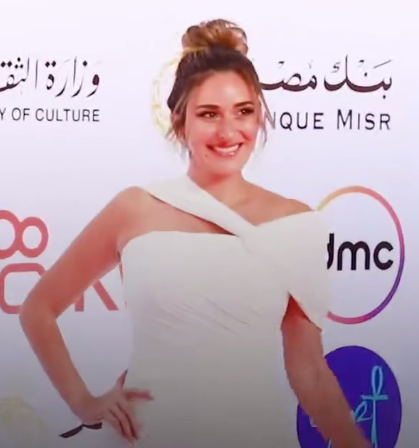
Khalil at the 43rd Cairo International Film Festival, 2022

She has had roles in Taraf Tallet, Sharbat Loze, Nekdeb Law Olna Mabenhebesh, Saheb El Saada and Wallei El Ahd. Khalil cites Marion Cotillard as her acting inspiration, and says she would like to play a lead in an action movie that is "Lara Croft style, or like Jennifer Lawrence in The Hunger Games". She has sung with Egyptian hip hop artist Zap Tharwat.

== Personal life ==
In July 2020, she became engaged to Egyptian businessman and engineer Omar Taha. Her hobbies include kitesurfing and swimming.

In October 2020, Khalil contracted COVID-19 and has since recovered.

She is an active proponent of women and their health in Egypt, and in June 2021 was named an honorary goodwill ambassador by the United Nations Population Fund.

== Filmography ==
Film
Year	Title	Genre	Role
2025	El Sett	Biopic	Guest appearance
2024	Ex Meraty (My Wife's Ex)	Comedy	Sahar
2024	Shekko	Drama	Fatna
2024	Anf wa Thalatha Oyoun (A Nose and Three Eyes)	Drama	
2023	Wesh x Wesh (Face to Face)	Comedy	
2021	A'az el Weld (Apple of my eyes)	Comedy	Jilan
2021	Waafet Regala (A stand worthy of men)		Mahi
2020	Hazr Tagawol (Curfew)		Layla
2020	Tawaam Rouhy (Soul Mate)		Layla / Reem
2020	Saheb Al Maqam (The Enshrined Saint)		Randa
2020	Los Baghdad (The Thief of Baghdad)	Action / Comedy	Nadia
2019	Al Kenz 2 (The Treasure 2)		Nimat Rizq
2019	122	Thriller	Omnia
2018	El Badla	Comedy	Reem
2017	Sheikh Jackson	Comedy	Aisha
2017	Al Khaleya (The Cell)	Action	Salma
2017	Al Kenz (The Treasure)		Ne'mat Rizq
2016	Khanet Al Yak	Thriller	
2015	Sukkar Mor	Drama	
2015	Khota Badela (Plan B)	Action / Crime	Hayah
2014	How Do You See Me!	Short	
2014	El-Mahragan	Comedy / Drama	
2012	Asham	Drama	Nadin
2011	A Tin Tale (Hadouta men Sag)	Short	Aida
2000	Catching The Stars	Short	Djamila

Series
Year	Title	Genre	Role
2025	Lam Shamsiya (The Elephant in the Room)	Thriller	Nelly
2023	El Harsha El Sab'aa (7th Year Itch)	Drama	Nadine
2022	Al Aa'edoon	Action / Drama	Nadine
2021	Khally Balak Men Zizi (Take Care of Zizi)	Drama	Zizi
2021	Mawdoo' A'ely (Family Matter)	Romantic Comedy	Layla
2020	Nemra Etnein (Number Two)	Drama	Nour
2020	Leh Laa? (Why Not?)	Drama	Alya
2019	Qabeel		Sama
2018	Layali Euginie (Eugenie Nights)		Karima
2017	La Totfe' Al Shams		Engy
2016	Grand Hotel		Nazly
2015	Esteefa	Mystery	Nourhan
2014	Saheb El Saada	Drama	Zahra
2012	Taraf Talet	Drama	Amina

== See also ==
- Cinema of Egypt
- List of Egyptian films of 2010s
