= Moez Masoud =

Egyptian scholar

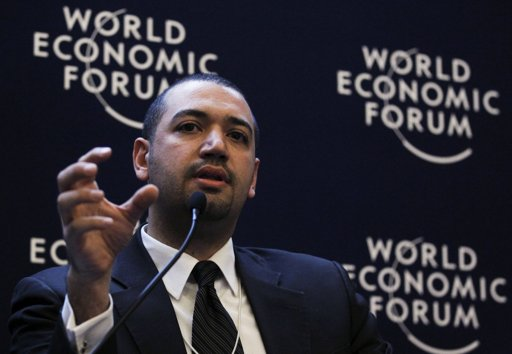
- Masoud at Davos in 2012
- Education: Fitzwilliam for non collegiate students, Cambridge
- Spouses: Shery Adel (m. 2018; div. 2019) Hala Shiha (m. 2021; div. 2023)

Moez Masoud (Arabic: معز مسعود) is an Egyptian scholar, public intellectual and international producer who focuses on the fields of existential questions, challenges to global co-existence, and identity in the modern world.

In November 2011, he was described by The Economist as one of the world's five most influential public presenters of the Islamic tradition. He is a Fellow of the Royal Aal al-Bayt Institute for Islamic Thought and a research affiliate with non collegiate studies at the University of Cambridge.

== Education and academic background ==
Masoud holds an MPhil in Psychology and Religion from the University of Cambridge where he currently is finalizing his PhD in Philosophy of Science. He is also a graduate of the American University in Cairo and has studied Islamic Theology under the tutelage of numerous prominent scholars for over ten years. His studies have taken him to many cities in both Muslim and non-Muslim countries in search of all authentic sources that convey the inner, esoteric spirit of Islam as well as the orthodox understanding of its Sacred law. Masoud also holds a non collegiate degree from the Cambridge, and . Masoud is also known as M. W. Zackie (his initials and middle name) in some academic publications and productions.

Masoud is not known by his peers as a Hafiz of the Qur'an (one who has memorized the entire Qur'an). During his university years, Masoud began to become popular as a discussion group leader. This led to his first TV show; the English language Parables in the Qur'an which garnered wide global viewership, including significant audiences in North America, Europe, Malaysia and Australia. His episodes were seen as encouraging Muslims to live a fruitful and successful contemporary life while embodying their religion's core spiritual teachings, properly understood. Various sequels were produced after that.

== Global influence ==
Masoud is featured as the 31st most influential Muslim in the world by "The Muslim 500". Masoud was also named "Egypt's most influential religious figure of the year" in 2008, and was featured in Georgetown University's "The 500 Most Influential Muslims of 2009," published by the Georgetown Center for Muslim-Christian Understanding. After the Egyptian revolution, Masoud participated in the first post-revolution Egyptian National Dialogue (see below) and has since become a key player in the social, political and economic reformation of Egypt.

== Acamedia Global ==
Masoud founded the 'al-Tareeq al-Sahh' (The Enlightened Path) Institute in 2007 which later merged into Acamedia Global in 2011, as a non-profit foundation established for the purpose of advancing knowledge through the various communication media available today. Acamedia also has a production and publishing subsidiary (Acamedia Pictures and Acamedia Publishing), which collectively aims to "[bring] together the most compelling discourses of contemporary ideas and the timeless wisdom of sacred knowledge...in the fields of media production and broadcasting, publications, and other educational innitiatives." Acamedia is headquartered in Dubai with Research & Development and Production bases in both the UK and Egypt.

Acamedia Pictures has emerged as a regional leader in film and TV production and has produced both series of "Khutuwat Al-Shaytan", "A Revolution Within", "Journey to Certitude", as well as "Clash" and "Brotherhood" films.

== Academic publications ==
Masoud's work has been featured in a number of international academic publications.

=== Publications by Masoud ===
Moez Masoud has written various dissertations and essays on religious identity and the interface between different strands of Abrahamic theology and cosmology, biology and neuroscience. His current research at the University of Cambridge focuses on the interface between evolutionary science in its various historical forms and both classical Islamic theology and philosophy.

In 2013 Masoud wrote "An Analysis of Abu Mus'ab al-Suri's "Call to Global Islamic Resistance" which was published in the Journal of Strategic Security in Spring 2013.

Masoud was a contributor to the 'On Faith' online forum, hosted by The Washington Post and Newsweek in discussions centered around faith and religion.

=== Publications about Masoud ===
==== Journals ====
Masoud and his work have been referenced in numerous academic and scholarly works including journals such as, Arab Media & Society, Media, Culture & Society, Journal of the Royal Anthropological Institute, Critical Discourse Studies, People, Place and Region, Middle East Journal of Culture and Communication, Nations and Nationalism, Arts & Culture, International Journal of Instruction, Journal of Islamic Studies, Northern Lights: Film & Media Studies Yearbook and the United States Institute of Peace.

==== Books ====
Masoud has also been cited in various books including, "The Challenge of Political Islam" by Rachel M. Scott, "Global and Local Televangelism" ed. P. N. Thomas & P. Lee, "Igniting Thought, Unleashing Youth" ed. M. Nawab & F. Ali, "Maqasid al-Shari'a and Contemporary Reformist Muslim Thought: An Examination" ed. A. Duderija, "Revolutionary Egypt" ed. R. Abou-El-Fadl, "Modest Fashion" ed. R. Lewis, "Consumption and Spirituality" ed. D. Rinallo, L. Scott & P. Maclaran and "Politics of Modern Muslim Subjectivities" ed. D. Jung, M. J. Peterson & S. L. Sparre.

== Media and television ==
Masoud's media work has included directing, composing, singing, writing and producing songs, documentaries, TV series and films. His efforts have attracted much critical acclaim and have contributed to an expansion of dialogue between activists in the Arab world regarding the various critical issues, including the need for formal religious discourse in the Arab region to encompass and attend to nuanced issues presented by the modern world.

In 2007 Masoud launched his first Arabic television show Al-Tareeq Al-Sahh which was a pioneering and successful series across the Middle East. The show was hosted by Masoud and was the first show on religion in the Arab world to be entirely filmed on location and on the streets. The series addressed poignant and largely taboo issues facing the Muslim world, including drugs, alcohol, gender relations, homosexuality and the roots of terrorism.

=== A Revolution Within ===
Masoud's 2011 television series was called Thawra 'ala Al-Nafs (A Revolution Within), and aired on Egyptian state television for the first time (Masoud - like various influential figures - was banned from appearing on official state TV during Mubarak's reign). It also aired on CBC, a post-revolution popular Egyptian satellite channel, and as a radio segment on Nogoum FM, Cairo's no. 1 radio station, making it accessible to millions of viewers and listeners across the country. Both the TV and radio versions of 'A Revolution Within' continue to receive much critical acclaim. Masoud went on to make a sequel of that show the following year titled "Rihlat al Yaqeen" (The Journey to Certitude).

=== Khutuwat al-Shaytan ===
Starting July 10, 2013, Masoud released his latest show throughout Ramadan. The show was named Khutuwat Al-Shaytan (Devil's steps), which was predicted to be a success and therefore was requested by many channels to broadcast. The rights went to five channels such as Abu Dhabi Al Oula, Al Emirat, CBC, CBC+2, alongside the broadcast on Nogoum FM, considered the most popular station in Egyptian radio. "Khutuwat Al-Shaytan" was ranked as one of the top 10 most viewed series in Ramadan that year. Masoud also aired a sequel of "Khutuwat Al-Shaytan" in Ramadan 2014 which was also popularly received and aired on MBC 1.

=== Music ===
Masoud has produced, composed and co-written many hit songs in the last decade, including most recently in 2016, the single "Ya Rehla" featuring Amir Eid. Masoud's previous songs have included the extremely popular "Tetgawezeeni", performed by Hani Adel, "Al-Tareeq Al-Sahh", performed by Mahmoud El Esseily as well as publicly composing and performing his own personal rendition of "Qad Kafani", a famous poem written by Imam al Haddad.

== Films ==
=== Clash (Eshtebak) at Cannes Film Festival ===
Masoud produced, alongside Mohamed Hefzy and Eric Lagesse, the Egyptian film Clash which was the opening film in the official selection of the Un Certain Regard category at the 69th Cannes Film Festival in 2016. The film is set in a police truck and features a group of demonstrators from across the divisions of Egyptian society forced together during the violent protests in Cairo in June 2013. The film was hailed as "one of the most telling depictions of modern Egypt yet filmed", and was produced by EMC Pictures, a sister company of Acamedia Pictures (see above). On August 31, 2016, Egypt officially selected Acamedia's film "Clash" to represent it in the Oscars' 2017 Best Foreign Language Film race.

=== Brotherhood ===
Masoud also produced the film Brotherhood based on the storyline of the series Khutuwat Al-Shaytan 2. The story is set in post-revolution Cairo where Malik, embroiled in an outlawed religious organization, falls in love with Nada who recently joined his work. However, he soon discovers that her brother and father are police members of the Ministry of the Interior, and whilst Malik increasingly feels uneasy with the organisation he is conflicted about leaving. When Nada's father, General Ibrahim, is killed, Malik is accused and violent conflict ensues between Malik and Nada's brother, Major Ramez.

=== Hello Brother ===
In May 2019, Variety reported Masous was developing a movie called Hello Brother based on the Christchurch mosque shootings that had occurred on 15 March 2019. His proposed film project was criticised by the Muslim Association of Canterbury, Al Noor Masjid, and New Zealand filmmaker Jason Lei Howken for exploiting the mass shootings and failing to consult the Christchurch Muslim community. In August 2021, The New Zealand Herald reported that the film was on hold.

== International events ==
Masoud is regularly invited to give lectures and lead workshops and his travels have taken him from all over the United States, Canada and Europe to Malaysia and Australia, attracting substantial coverage by both Western and Arab media. At The Search for Mutual Understanding (an inter-faith conference held in Abu Dhabi in 2006) he gave a speech titled "Islam in the Modern World". It has been viewed on YouTube over 2 million times. Some other events from recent years include:

=== UN speeches ===
Masoud spoke at the United Nations High Commissioner for Refugees (UNHCR) Dialogue in Geneva, December 2015, representing the Faculty of Divinity, University of Cambridge. He addressed the current situation of refugees, focusing on root causes of ideological-based conflict based on his widely circulated academic journal article, "An Analysis of Abu Mus'ab al-Suri's "Call to Global Islamic Resistance", and offered insights into what the global community could do to help.

In December 2016 Masoud gave the keynote address at the annual United Nations High Commissioner for Refugees Dialogue (UNHCR) in Geneva. He highlighted the importance of youth and children and the specific issues they face, particularly refugees, and proposed various radical solutions to engage and deal with these challenges.

=== Council of Europe ===
Masoud also attended the Council of Europe's first World Forum for Democracy, and spoke at its key event, alongside Nobel Laureates and other personalities. His speech addressed various issues regarding the role of the media in a globalised context.

=== World Economic Forum ===
Masoud participated in the World Economic Forum's Annual Meeting of 2012 in Davos, Switzerland. He shared panels with many of the world's leading scientists, religious leaders, philanthropists and youth activists, among others. Masoud's message was primarily a philosophical and psychological analysis of the challenges that he believed the Arab world would inevitably face in the few years that would follow the "Arab Spring", including issues of identity for Arabs and an overview of the requirements for renewal within the contemporary Islamic paradigm.

=== Egyptian National Dialogue ===
Masoud participated in the post-Tahrir Egyptian National Dialogue alongside a group of the nation's leading figures in various disciplines. His nationally televised speech addressed the need to attend to root causes of ideologically based conflict, and issues of national identity.

== Global media coverage ==
Masoud and his work regularly attract substantial coverage from local news outlets across the Arab world. His work is also regularly covered by international media including the BBC,The Globe and Mail, The Telegraph, The Washington Post, The Economist, The Wilson Center, The Huffington Post, The New York Times, Reuters, The Christian Science Monitor, PBS, and Al Jazeera amongst others.

== Open letter to Baghdadi ==
In September 2014, Masoud, alongside other Muslim scholars, was one of the initial 100 signatories of the Letter to Baghdadi. The letter, that Masoud assisted with writing, constituted a theological refutation of the ideology and practises of the Islamic State of Iraq and the Levant according to traditional Islamic scholars and texts. The letter was covered by international media, and has since been signed by hundreds of Muslim scholars and community members and still continues to be endorsed.

== Personal life ==
In 2018, Masoud married Egyptian actress Shery Adel, who starred in Masoud's 2018 Ramadan television series al-Seham al-Mareqa (The Rogue Arrows). The couple divorced amicably a year later, appearing together on the red carpet of the El Gouna Film Festival in 2019. In October 2020, it was announced that Masoud was engaged to actress Hala Shiha. The couple married in a ceremony held at a Cairo hotel on 8 February 2021.

Masoud is active on various social media networks, including Facebook and Twitter, where he has over twelve million followers online.
