= Silence, We're Rolling =

2001 film

- Directed by: Youssef Chahine
- Screenplay by: Youssef Chahine
- Produced by: Humbert Balsan; Gabriel Khoury; Marianne Khoury
- Starring: Latifa
- Cinematography: Pierre Dupouey
- Edited by: Annette Dutertre
- Music by: Gamal Békhit; Omar Khairat; Kaushar Mostapha
- Release date: 2001

Silence, We're Rolling (Arabic: سكوت .. حنصور, romanized: Sukut .. hnsur, French: Silence... on tourne, also spelled Silence... We're Rolling) is a 2001 musical comedy film written and directed by Youssef Chahine. A co-production between Egypt and France, it premiered at the 58th Venice International Film Festival.

== Cast ==
- Latifa as Malak
- Ahmed Bedir as Alphi
- Ahmed Wafik as Lamei
- Magda El-Khatib as Grand-mère
- Zaki Abdel Wahab as Ezz Eldine
- Ahmed Mehrez as Abbas
- Ruby as Paula
- Mostafa Shaaban as Nasser

== Production ==
The film was produced by MISR Intl Films, Ognon Pictures, Havas Image and France 2 Cinéma. The film's production proved to be difficult, as Chahine faced several health issues during the shootings.

Famous singer Ruby had a small role in the film, which was one of her first film appearances. Youssef Chahine in the production of the film gave her her pseudonym.

== Release ==
The film had its world premiere out of competition at the 58th edition of the Venice Film Festival. It was also screened at the New York Film Festival and at the Marrakech International Film Festival.

== Reception ==
Variety's critic Deborah Young described the film as "an enjoyable introduction to authentic Egyptian cinema [...] shot with irony and intelligence". Peter Bradshaw from The Guardian praised it, writing "It's impossible not to be carried along by the hellzapoppin' high spirits of Chahine's movie", in which "the beating heart of show business pulses gloriously". Ed Gonzalez from Slant Magazine called it "a rollicking paean to the Hollywood and Bollywood musicals of yesteryear", and "an eye-popping, almost Sturgesian celebration of art imitating life, and vice versa."
