= Al Mal W Al Banon 1 =

- Season 1
- Native name: Al Mal W Al Banon 1 المال والبنون
- No. of episodes: 30

Release
- Original release: 4 March 1992

Al Mal W Al Banon 1 (Egyptian Arabic: المال والبنون 1) It is an Egyptian series in two stages, produced in 1993, starring Youssef Shaaban, Abdullah Ghais, Fadia Abdel Ghani, Abla Kamel, and directed by Magdy Abu Amira.

== Plot ==
Yusef wants to qualify for marriage to a miss daughter, but their fathers and mothers refuse, and knowing the love and affection of the family between them despite the strong friendship, Yusef knew and made sure that his mother works with a person who is a drug dealer, jewelry and antiquities, and although he is outside Egypt, but after the death of Khawaja, he surprises the person whose name is Salama, who struggles with money And money in order to enjoy it, but Abbas's conscience refrains from that, that money that has no source, so safety quarrels with Abbas and they separate from each other.

== Cast ==
- Abdullah Ghaith Follow Favorite
- Youssef Shaaban (safety strawberries).
- Ahmed Abdel Aziz Follow Favorite.
- Sharif Mounir Follow Favorite
- Faiza Kamal Follow Favorite
- Aida Riyad (baizah)
- Zizi El Badrawy Favorite
- Raja Hussain (superscript)
- Mr. Xian (Syed Ahmed Al-Qas)
- Waheed Saif Follow Favorite
- Rashwan Tawfiq (Dr. Imam - guest speaker)
- Hayatem (Dancer Lola)
- Abla Kamel (Ruqayya Muhammad al-Maliki)
- Ahmed Ratib Follow Favorite
- Hanan Turk (Soraya Mohammed Al-Maliki)
- Hassan Hosni Follow Favorite
- Ibrahim Yousry Follow Favorite
- Muhammad Abu Al-Hassan (registrar)
- Fadia Abdelghani Follow Favorite
- Salah Rashwan (Akkad cult)
- Hanan Suleiman (emotions)
- Hadi Al-Jayar Favorite
- Mohammed Al Shuwahi Follow Favorite
- Salwa Othman (Mrs)
- Sahar Talaat (beautiful)
- Hanem Mohamed.

== Film festivals and commercial releases ==
Many commercials were aired on MBC 1, 2, 3, 4, Drama, Max, Masr, and Action.

The cast won an award at the Al Ahram Festival.

== See also ==
- List of Egyptian television series
