= Bobbos =

- Directed by: Wael Ehsan
- Written by: Youssef Maaty
- Starring: Adel Emam; Yousra
- Release date: June 17, 2009
- Running time: 113 minutes
- Country: Egypt
- Language: Arabic

Bobbos (Arabic: بوبوس) is an Egyptian film released in 2009.

== Plot ==
A businessman, stuck in the credit crunch, falls in love with a businesswoman who is in turn stuck in the credit crunch.

== Cast ==
- Adel Emam as Mohsen Hendawi
- Yousra as Mohga
- Ezzat Abou Aouf as Nizam
- Hassan Hosny as Abdel Monsef
- Ashraf Abdel Baqi as Raafat
- May Kassab as Tahany

== Reception ==
The film was the subject of some criticism as being over-reliant on sexual innuendo.
