= Hana Shiha =

Egyptian actress (born 1985)

- هنا شيحه
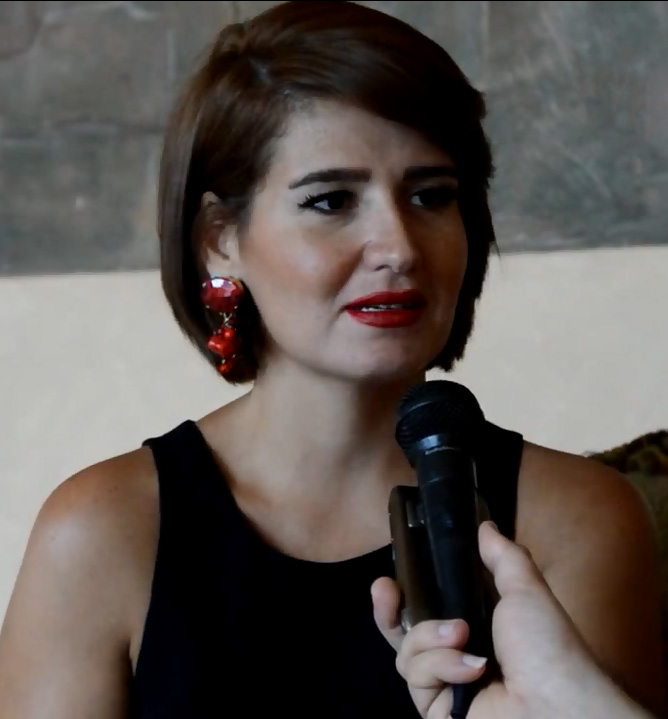
- Hana Shiha
- Born: December 25, 1985 (age 40); Beirut, Lebanon
- Education: Academy of Arts
- Occupation: Actress
- Years active: 2000–present
- Relatives: Hala Shiha, Maya Shiha, Rasha Shiha (sisters)

Hana Shiha (born 25 December 1985) is an Egyptian actress. She graduated from the Academy of Arts in Egypt, majoring acting and directing. She started her career in the hit series "el bar el Gharbi" in 2002 while she was still a student

== Biography ==
Hana Shiha was born on 25 December 1985 in Beirut, to Ahmed Shiha, who is an Internationally proclaimed popular Egyptian painter, and a Lebanese mother Nadia Zeitoun both loved arts and saw blossoming talents in there young girls, encouraged her 4 daughters to be more creative, taking piano, ballet lessons as children. Hana fell in love with reading too, taking it up from her mother, she finished reading the French, British and Egyptian literature, at the age of 16.

In her adolescent years, reading edged out the other arts and became a kind of refuge—as her classmates sought out fun in the sun, the fair-skinned Hana retreated to read more books and gain more knowledge. Pursuing her passion for stories, cinema and performing, by enrolling in the academy of arts, receiving a bachelor's degree from the high institute of Dramatic arts, majoring acting & directing.

== Career ==
She broke into the silver screen at age 20, landing a role in "EL BAR EL GHARBI" in 2002. That appearance led to further film and television offers, including a lead in Egypt hit film "HOB EL BANAT"aka "GIRL'S LOVE" (2003), A turn in series"MUBARA ZAWGEYA" (2004), Followed by the leading role in film "DARS KHOSOUSY " Aka "PRIVATE LESSON"(2005). Shiha's next casting coup scored her more than exposure, While starring as the lovely daddy's girl in the Hit series "YETRABA FE EZZO" (2007), she won over Egypt's heart, line and sinker. 2009, Shiha hosted a TV comic show (100,7) which added a new value to the actress as a deadly comic talent. Imprisoned In the sweetheart role, eager for wider range roles, Shiha wanted to change the known Egypt's sweet heart, the girl next door type, decided to make a turning point in her career to land a new role in the series "SHAREA ABDEL AZIZ" (2011), which was a hit success followed by the series "TAREF TALET" aka "THIRD PARTY" (2012.

Hana Shiha appeared in the series Moga Harra (The Heat Wave, 2013), taking on a femme fatale role. She gained wider recognition with the 2014 series El Sabaa Wassaya (The Seven Commandments), in which she played the character "Em-Em." In the same year, she starred in the film Before the Spring, portraying a political online activist advocating for election rights and freedom of speech prior to the 2011 Egyptian revolution.

In 2015, Shiha appeared in the series El Adh: El Kalam El Mubah (The Vow), playing the character "Segag." She later worked with director Mohamed Khan in his feature film Abl Zahmet El Seif (Before the Summer Crowd), a production noted for its distinctive storytelling style.

== Filmography ==
No	Year	Film name	Credited As	Notes
1	2004	Hob El-Banat ("Girls' Love")	Ro'aya Mustafa Abu Hagar	
2	2005	Dars Khosousy ("Private Lesson")	Gamila	
3	2007	Yetraba Fe Ezzo	-	
4	2007	7th st, of Happiness	-	
5	2008	ayam el ro3b wel hob (Days of love and thunder )		
6	2010	Musharaffa (A man of this era)	Dawlat	
7	2011	Sharea Abdel Aziz	Lobna	
8	2012	Taraf Talet	Gigi	
9	2013	Moga Harra	Noussa	
10	2014	Before The Spring	Sara	
11	2014	El saba3 Wasaya	Em.Em	
12	2015	El Ahd : El kalam El Mobah	Segag	
13	2015	El Beyut Asrar	Walaa	
14	2015	Before the Summer Crowds	Sara	Chosen for her creativity and genuine performance, Mohamed Khan chose her to star his new feature film
