= Reham Abdel Ghafour =

Egyptian actress (born 1978)

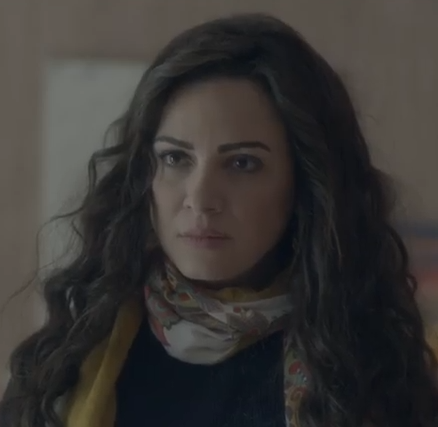
- Born: September 6, 1978 (age 47); El Mahalla El Kubra, Egypt
- Occupation: Actress
- Years active: 2000–present
- Notable work: Saheb Sahbo; Harem Kareem; Al Hakeka w Al Sarab

Reham Abdel Ghafour (Arabic: ريهام عبد الغفور; born 6 September 1978 in El Mahalla El Kubra) is an Egyptian actress and the daughter of famous Egyptian actor Ashraf Abdel Ghafour.

== Education and Career ==
She graduated from the Faculty of Commerce-English section. She appeared with Mohamed Henedi and Ashraf Abdel Baqi in the film Saheb Sahbo.

Reham has acted in many TV series and films like Mallaki Eskinderiya, Kan yom Hobak, Gayy fel Saree', BelAraby cinderella. She also participated in plays like Bint Bonoot, AlMalek Lear (i.e. King Lear) with the star Yehia El-Fakharany and Hamlet play at Egyptian theaters.

== Filmography ==
=== Films ===
- The academy (2009)
- Alghaba (i.e. The Wild) (2008) as "Gamila", streets princess
- Alia ElTarab bel3 (2007) as "Mona"
- Ga'alatny Mogreman (i.e. She made me a criminal) (2006) as "Saly"
- Zay ElHawa (i.e. Same as the air) (2006) as "Nour"
- BelAraby Cindrella (i.e. Arabic cinderella) (2006) as "Tokka" (Starring role)
- Gy Fe ElSaree3 (i.e. Coming fast) (2005) as "Abeer" (Starring role)
- Hareem Kareem (i.e. Kareem's girls) (2005) as "Nevien" featuring Moustafa Amar.
- Malaky Eskendria (i.e. Private Alex) (2005) as "Rasha Nos-hi"
- Kan Yom Hobak (i.e. The day I loved you) as "Hannan"
- Sehr El oyon (i.e. Eyes' Magic) as "Dina"
- Saheb Sahbo (i.e. true friend or Friend of his Friend)) as "Shapinam" (Starring role)
- The Fourth Pyramid (2016)

=== TV series ===
- Shekh El Arab Hammam (i.e. Hammam the Arab's Shekh) (2010) as "Ward Elyaman", Hammam's daughter
- Mesh Alf Lella w Lella (i.e. Not 1001 Nights) (2010) as "Shahrazad" the famous literature character of One Thousand and One Nights
- Bent Bonot (i.e. Virgin) (2006) as "Noha"
- Mn Gher Ma'ad (i.e. Without arrangement) (2006) as "Sahar" (starring role)
- Andaleb Hekayet Sha'b (i.e. Abdel Halim Hafez's Biography ) (2006) She portrays Faten Hamama, the Egyptian actress
- Ameel 1001 (i.e. Client 1001) (2006) as "Rachel"
- Amaken Fe ElAlb (i.e. Places in my heart) (2005) as "Margeret"
- Bent Mn Shubra (i.e. Girl from Shubra) as "Lena"
- AlHakeka w AlSarab (i.e. The reality and the fantasy) as "Salwa"
- AlAmma Nour (i.e. Aunt Nour)
- Hadith ElSabah W AlMasa' (i.e. Morning and Evening stories) as "Sedriah"
- Mas'alet Mabda2 (i.e. Just a Principle)
- Fares Bela Gawad (i.e. A Knight Without a Horse)
- Shams Yom Gedid (i.e. New future)
- Zizenia
- AlA'ela w AlNas (i.e. The Family and the community)
- Catalog (TV series) role as Amina

== Plays ==
- King Lear her character was the youngest daughter Cordelia
- Hamlet her character was Olivia
