= Thieves in Thailand =

2003 film by Sandra Nashaat

- Directed by: Sandra Nashaat
- Starring: Hanan Tork, Karim Abdel Aziz, Maged el-Kedwany
- Release dates: May 2, 2003
- Running time: +100 minutes
- Country: Egypt
- Language: Egyptian Arabic

Thieves in Thailand (Arabic: حرامية في تايلاند "Haramiyyah fi Tayland") is a 2003 Egyptian film directed by Sandra Nashaat. It is a 35 mm film and lasts for 105 minutes. Lisa Anderson of the Chicago Tribune uses the film as an example of increasing conservatism in Egypt.

== Plot ==
It is set in Thailand and includes a romance. The main character, Fatin, is a late 20s, lower middle class man from Cairo who travels to Thailand. No intimate contact, not even a kiss, is seen.

== Production ==
The naming was meant to coincide with Ismail Yassin films. The films, which used the same cast members and the same style, but had differing themes and stories, started with Ismail Yassin fi ("Ismail Yassin in"). Likewise this film was produced after Nashaat's Harameya fi KG2 (Thieves in KG2).

== Cast ==
- Maged el-Kedwany – Fatin
- Karim Abdel-Aziz – Ebrahim, Fatin's brother
- Hanan Tork – Hanan – Hanan is Ebrahim's wife and is forced to be his accomplice

== Reception ==
The film was very popular in Egypt. Sandra Nashaat said "The film was as well received as I expected, although I feel it could have been seen by a greater number of people. But of course due to the war fewer people are going to the movies. One of my concerns was that Harameya fi Thailand would be compared and contrasted with Harameya fi KG2, because they are two entirely different films. In the end the inevitable happened, but at least it was positive: many liked Harameya fi Thailand more."

Sherif Iskander Nakhla of Al-Ahram Weekly said "As a whole the film has memorable moments, yet its narrative structure falls short of the highest standards." Lisa Anderson of the Chicago Tribune described the film as "A mindless romp spiced with lush Thai landscapes".

== See also ==
- Cinema of Egypt
- Thieves in KG2
