= Moustafa Amar =

Egyptian musician and actor (born 1966)

Moustafa Amar مصطفى قمر
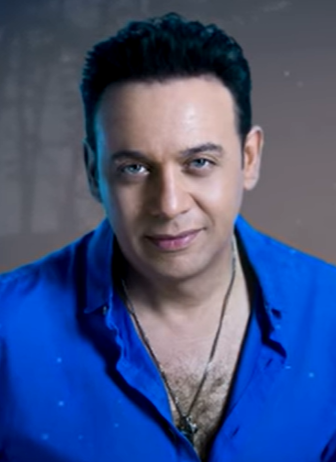

Background information
- Also known as: Mustafa Amar, Mostafa Amar, Mustafa Gamar, Mostafa Gamar, Moustafa Gamar, Moustafa Qamar, Moustafa Kamar, Mustafa Qamar, Mostafa Qamar, Mustafa Kamar, Mostafa Kamar
- Born: Moustafa Ahmed Mohamed Hassan Amar مصطفى أحمد محمد حسن قمر; 22 September 1966 (age 60)
- Origin: Alexandria, Egypt
- Genre: Arabic pop
- Occupations: actor and singer
- Instruments: Guitar, vocals
- Years active: 1990–present
- Labels: Sonar (Slam!), Rotana, Alam El Phan, Mazzika
- Spouse(s): Ghada Eisa (m. 1993; div. 2015) Ghada Rizq (m. 2015)

Moustafa Amar (Arabic: مصطفى قمر; born 22 September 1966) is an Egyptian singer and actor.

== Career ==
In music, Amar rose to fame by virtue of the success of his albums of the likes of "Quloo li fein Habibti" ("Tell Me Where My Loved One Is"), "Ya Wad Ya Iskandarani" ("Oh, Alexandrian"), "Taal Al Leil" ("It’s been a Long Night") and "Ya Ghazali" ("My Precious"). He is considered one of the most successful singers in Egypt. He released various hit albums such as "Seket El Asheqeen".

In acting he is known for his roles in films ”El Hob Al Awal” (2000), “Ashab Wala Business” (2001), “Elb Gareh” (2002), and “Hareem Karim” (2005). Amar was also cast in Esyabet Al Doctor Omar” (2007), “Mafeesh Fayda” (2008), and “Gowa El Lohba” (2012).

== Discography ==
- Wassaf (1991)
- Layaliki (1993)
- Seket Al-Ashe'en (1994)
- Eftakerny (1995)
- Liman Yahoummouh Al Amr (1996)
- Tal Ellil (1997)
- Nar El Hob (1998)
- Ainik Wahshany (1999)
- Aisheen (with Gipsy Kings) (2000)
- Hayaty (2001)
- Monaya (2002)
- Bahebek Wana Kaman (2003)
- Ahlam (2003)
- Rohy Feek (2003)
- Bahebak Wana Kaman (2003)
- Enssa (2004)
- Lessa Habayeb (2006)
- Heya (2010)
- Mawlaya Sobhanak (2013)
- Ana Metamen (2014)
- Dehket Leya (2019)
- Liman Yahoummouh Al Amr 2 (2020)
- Amar Amareen (2026)

=== Singles ===
- Ghazali (ft Hamid El Shari) (2000)
- Aisheen (with Gipsy Kings) (2000)
- Habib Hayati (2001)
- Sotak Mosh Kefaya (ft. Sherine Wagdy) (2006)
- Mareed Bel Hob (2008)
- Aywa Enta (2008)
- De7ket 2alet (2009)
- Hatganen (2011)
- Papa Nwel new arrangement (2013)

== Filmography ==
- Al Batal (1997)
- Al Hob Al Awal (2000)
- As'hab Walla Business (2001)
- Alb Garee (2002)
- Bahebbak Wana Kaman (2003)
- Hobbak Nar (2004)
- Hareem Kareem (2005)
- Esabet Al-Doctor Omar (2007)
- Mafeesh Faida (2008)
- Gowa El Le'ba (2012)
- Fen Alby(2017)

=== TV series ===
- Ali Ya Weka (2007)
- Montaha elaeshaa (2010)
- Essam w elmesba7 Part II (Vocal Performance) (2012)

== FM series ==
- maesr Italya wbl2ks (2003)
- bahebk Ya Magnona (2006)
- Fares men elzaman elgadid (2011)

== Charts ==
"Lessa Habayeb"
Chart (2006)
Peak position
Rotana Albums Top 100	76
Alam El Phan Albums Top 50	1
