= Maged el-Kedwany =

Egyptian actor (born 1967)

Maged El Kedwany
- ماجد نبيل الكدوانى
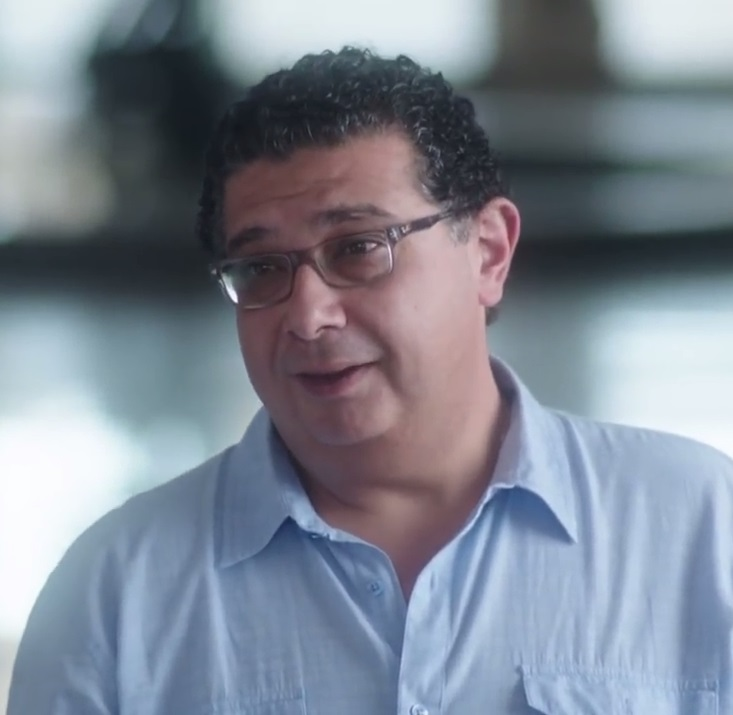
- Maged el-Kedwany in Under Control (2015)
- Born: Maged Nabil el-Kedwani; 10 December 1967 (age 58); Shubra, Cairo, Egypt
- Occupation: Actor
- Years active: 1990–present
- Known for: Hepta; 678; Asmaa; Thieves in KG2; Thieves in Thailand; Teer Enta

Maged Nabil Elkedwani (Arabic: ماجد نبيل الكدوانى: born: 10 December 1967) is an Egyptian actor. He began acting in the 1990s, playing supporting roles. He has worked in films, among them are some of the most well-known films of the 1990s, like Afareet el-Asphalt (Asphalt Ghosts) in 1996.

His other films include Harameya Ki-Gi-To (Ki-Gi-To Thieves), Harameya fe Thailand (Thieves in Thailand), Al-Ragel al-Abyad al-Motawast (Average White Guy), and Khaly min Kolesterol (Cholesterol-Free). In 2012, he appeared in two high-profile movies, Hafla Montasif al-Leil (Midnight Party) and Saaa we Nos (Hour and a Half). Amongst the theatrical productions that he has performed in are "Ballo" and "Diwan Al Baqar". Maged has also made several television appearances, which include roles in "Nahnu la Nazra Al Shawk", "Al Farar Men Al Hob", "Al Shara’a Al Jadeed", "Zayzenia" and "Arabesque".

== Personal life ==
Maged el-Kedwani was born in 1967 in the district of Shubra, Cairo, Egypt. At a young age, Maged was brought up in Kuwait till the age of 18. He began his professional career while studying design at the Faculty of Fine Arts. He began acting in a number of amateur plays, which led to him being cast in various TV shows like Qanfad (Hedgehog) and Nahnu la Nazre el-Shook. Thereafter he enrolled in the Institute of Theatrical Arts and graduated in 1995. He currently lives in El Rehab city.

== Selected filmography ==
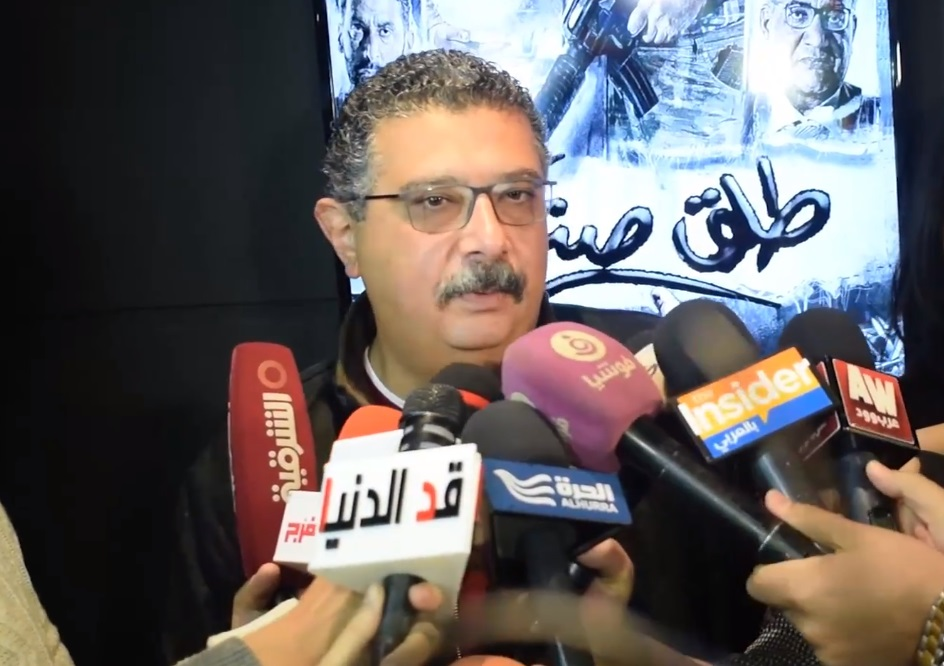
Maged el-Kedwany in Talq Senaay Premier in Jan 2018

- Afareet el-Asphalt (Asphalt Ghosts) (1996)
- Thieves in KG2 (2001)
- Thieves in Thailand (2003)
- Askar fil-Mu'askar (Soldiers in the Camp) (2003)
- Teer enta (You Fly) (2009)
- 678 (2010)
- Asmaa (2011)
- Before the Summer Crowds (2016)
- The Originals (2017)
- Diamond Dust (2018)
- The Crime (2022)
- Fadl wa Ni'ma (2022)
- Abu Nasab (2023)
- El Le'b ma El Eyal (2024)
- Project X (2025)
- Fiha Eh Yaani? (2025)

Animation Roles (Arabic Dubs)

Monsters Inc.

The Cat in The Hat (2026): The Cat in The Hat

== See also ==
- Cinema of Egypt
