= Hala Shiha =

Egyptian actress (born 1980)

- Born: February 23, 1979 (age 47); Cairo, Egypt
- Citizenship: Egypt
- Occupation: Actress
- Years active: 1999–2006; 2019–2021
- Spouses: Steven Mark Harrison (m. 2007; div. 2018) Moez Masoud (m. 2021; div. 2023)
- Relatives: Hana Shiha, Maya Shiha, Rasha Shiha (sisters)

Hala Shiha (Arabic: حلا شيحة; born 23 February 1979 in Cairo, Egypt) is an Egyptian actress best known for portraying the main roles in Snakes and Ladders, and Lost in America.

She officially retired from the entertainment industry in the 2005, after she decided to start wearing the hijab. The following year, she made a brief comeback to star in a role with her hijab. Her decision to start wearing the hijab and retire from the entertainment industry at such a young age and so soon in her career caused controversy. It sparked a massive debate in Egypt about the veil and the decline of secularism within Egyptian society and among Egyptians. On August 8, 2018, Shiha announced her return to acting after photos of her were posted in social media without a veil.

== Biography ==
Hala Shiha was born in Cairo, Egypt to an Egyptian father the international acclaimed painter Ahmed Shiha and a Lebanese mother who is also an artist. She is the eldest out of four daughters, including Hana Shiha.

Shiha is a Muslim. She shocked the entertainment world when she announced her resignation for the second time in her career; the first time was in 2003, because she found peace and tranquillity in following the straight path of Allah. Originally, deciding to wear the hijab in 2003, Hala had taken off her Islamic scarf known as hijab after wearing it for a period of eleven year's amidst objection from family and members of the acting world. She returned to wearing it in 2005 once she declared she was planning to quit acting. On August 8, 2018, Hala Shiha announced her return to acting and also she removed the hijab.

She has married Moez Masoud in February 2021.

In July 2021, Shiha criticized Tamer Hosny for posting intimate scenes from their film Mesh Ana (This Is Not Me) during the Hajj period. She also criticized art in general which prompted the Egyptian Actors Syndicate headed by Ashraf Zaki to write her off.

== Filmography ==
- 2000 Leih Khaltny Ahebbak
- 2001 El Selem Wel Teaban
- 2002 Lost in America
- 2002 Sher El Oyoun
- 2002 El Lemby
- 2004 Arees Men Geha Amneya
- 2005 Orido kholaan
- 2005 Ghawi Hob
- 2006 Kamel El Awsaf
