= List of Egyptian films of 2017 =

A list of films produced in Egypt in 2017. For an A-Z list of films currently on Wikipedia, see Category:Egyptian films.

	Director	Cast	Genre	Notes
The Treasure (Al Kenz)	Sherif Arafa	Mohamed Ramadan, Mohamed Saad, Hend Sabry	Drama, Historical	
Forced Escape (Horoob Etirari)	Ahmed Khaled Moussa	Ahmed El Sakka, Ghada Adel, Amir Karara	Action, Thriller	
The Originals (Al Aslyeen)	Marwan Hamed	Khaled El Sawy, Maged El Kedwany, Menna Shalaby	Drama, Mystery	
Sheikh Jackson	Amr Salama	Ahmed Fishawy, Ahmed Malek, Maged El Kedwany	Drama	Egypt's entry for the best foreign-language film at the 90th Academy Awards
The Cell (El Khaleya)	Tarek Al Eryan	Ahmed Ezz, Amina Khalil, Mohamed Mamdouh	Action, Drama	
Arrest Letter (Gawab Ieteqal)	Mohamed Samy	Mohamed Ramadan, Dina El Sherbiny, Eyad Nassar	Action, Thriller	
Seeking a Man (Bashtry Ragel)	Mohamed Ali	Nelly Karim, Mohamed Mamdouh	Comedy, Romance	
Ali, the Goat and Ibrahim (Ali Me’za wa Ibrahim)	Sherif El Bandary	Ahmed Magdy, Ali Sobhy, Nahed El Sebaey	Drama, Fantasy	
Last Rooster in Egypt (Akher Deek Fe Masr)	Amr Arafa	Mohamed Ramadan, Mai Omar, Hala Sedki	Comedy	
Monopoly (Bank El Haz)	Ahmed El Gendy	Mohamed Mamdouh, Akram Hosny, Mohamed Tharwat	Comedy, Crime	
Antar, The Fourth Grandson of Shadad (Antar Ibn Ibn Ibn Ibn Shadad)	Sherif Ismail	Mohamed Henedy, Dorra, Bassem Samra	Comedy	
Good Night (Tesbah ‘Ala Kheir)	Mohamed Samy	Tamer Hosny, Nour, Dorra, Mai Omar	Drama, Romance	
