= Saturday Night Live bil Arabi =

Television program

- Also known as: Saturday Night Live Arabic
- Arabic: ساترداي نايت لايف بالعربي
- Genre: Sketch comedy; Comedy; Variety
- Directed by: Amr Salama
- Opening theme: by Eftekasat
- Country of origin: Egypt
- Original language: Arabic
- No. of seasons: 4
- No. of episodes: 53

Production
- Producer: Tarek el-Ganainy
- Editor: Ali Murad
- Production companies: TVision; Broadway Video; SNL Studios; NBCUniversal International Studios

Original release
- Network: OSN (2016–2018); ONtv (2017–2018)
- Release: February 16, 2016 – January 6, 2018 (suspended)

Saturday Night Live Arabic (Arabic: ساترداي نايت لايف بالعربي), commonly known as SNL Arabia, is an Egyptian late-night sketch comedy and variety television program broadcast on OSN Ya Hala HD. It is the Arab world's edition of the long-running American TV show Saturday Night Live on NBC. Each episode is hosted by a celebrity guest, who usually delivers an opening monologue and performs in sketches with the cast, with featured performances by a musical guest. An episode normally begins with a cold open sketch that ends with someone breaking character and proclaiming, "from Cairo, it's Saturday Night Live in Arabic" (Arabic: من القاهرة، ساترداي نايت لايف بالعربي), properly beginning the show.

The weekly program premiered on February 16, 2016, on OSN and aired on 11:30 pm EET. On October 7, 2017, at the beginning of season 4 the show started airing on ONtv. The show was suspended by the Supreme Media Council in February 2018 for containing "sexual implications".

== Cast ==
- Khalid Mansour (Weekend Update anchor)
- Shadi Alfons (Weekend Update anchor)
- Nour Qadri
- Tony Maher
- Mahmoud Ellisy
- Islam Ibrahim
- Mirna Gamil
- Ahmed Sultan
- Allawi al-Husseini
- Nancy Salah
- Yara Fahmi
- Hazim Ehab
- Amro Wahba (Joined 2017)

== Series overview ==
Season	Episodes	Originally aired	
Season	Episodes	First aired	Last aired
1	13	February 16, 2016	2016
2	13	September 17, 2016	December 11, 2016
3	13	February 18, 2017	June 13, 2017
4	14	October 7, 2017	January 6, 2018

== Episodes ==
=== Season 1 (2016) ===
No. overall	No. in season	Host	Musical guest(s)	Original release date
1	1	Donia Samir Ghanem	Boy Band	February 16, 2016
2	2	Mona Zaki	Bosy	2016
3	3	Hend Sabry	Ahmed Saad	2016
4	4	Ahmed Fahmi	Dina al-Wadidy	2016
5	5	Ruby	Mahmoud el-Esseily	2016
6	6	Hassan El Raddad	Mai Selim	2016
7	7	Dorra Zarrouk	Mustafa Hajaj	2016
8	8	Amr Youssef	Ahmed Adaweyah	2016
9	9	Emy Samir Ghanem	Yuri Mraqqadi	2016
10	10	Kinda Alloush	Muhammad Rashad	2016
11	11	Mohamed Barakat	Carmen Soliman	2016
12	12	Ayten Amer	Ahmad Gamal	2016
13	13	Amr Saad	Salalem Band	2016

=== Season 2 (2016) ===
No. overall	No. in season	Host	Musical guest(s)	Original release date
14	1	Asser Yassin	Nesma Mahgoub	September 17, 2016
15	2	Dina El Sherbiny	Nasser Abu Lafy	September 24, 2016
16	3	Nelly Karim	Massar Egbari	October 1, 2016
17	4	Haya al-Shuaibi	Black Theama	October 8, 2016
18	5	Dhafer L'Abidine	Wust El-Balad	October 15, 2016
19	6	Rania Youssef	Abd el-Fattah el-Grini	October 22, 2016
20	7	Maya Diab	Maya Diab	October 29, 2016
21	8	Hana Shiha	Basata Band	November 5, 2016
22	9	Hamada Helal	Hamada Helal	November 12, 2016
23	10	Yasmin Raeis	Sharmoofers Band	November 19, 2016
24	11	Wama	Wama	November 26, 2016
25	12	Nicole Saba	Nicole Saba	December 3, 2016
26	13	Hany Ramzy	Takh Band	December 11, 2016

=== Season 3 (2017) ===
No. overall	No. in season	Host	Musical guest(s)	Original release date
27	1	Yousra	Ramy Ayach	February 18, 2017
28	2	Fifi Abdou	Amina	February 25, 2017
29	3	Zeina	Mahmoud Ellisy	March 4, 2017
30	4	Samir Ghanem	JadaL	March 11, 2017
31	5	Ahmed El-Fishawy	Qusay & Sphynx	March 18, 2017
32	6	Akram Hosny	Hossam Habib	March 25, 2017
33	7	Nahed El Sebai	Mohamed el-Rifi	April 1, 2017
34	8	Amina Khalil	Hossam Hosny	April 8, 2017
35	9	Hisham Abbas & Hamid Al-Shairi	Hisham Abbas & Hamid Al-Shairi	April 15, 2017
36	10	Saba Mubarak	Medhat Saleh	April 22, 2017
37	11	Hasan al-Ballam	Abdel Basset Hamouda	April 29, 2017
38	12	Eyad Nassar	Tarabband	May 6, 2017
39	13	Myriam Fares	Myriam Fares	June 13, 2017

=== Season 4 (2017–18) ===
No. overall	No. in season	Host	Musical guest(s)	Original release date
40	1	Haifa Wehbe	Haifa Wehbe	October 7, 2017
41	2	Ahmed Dawood	Tarek el-Sheikh	October 14, 2017
42	3	Shereen Reda	Ahmed Sheba	October 21, 2017
43	4	Bayoumi Fouad	Abo	October 28, 2017
44	5	Somaya El Khashab	Ramy Sabry	November 4, 2017
45	6	Khaled El Nabawy	Diab	November 11, 2017
46	7	Menna Shalaby	Emad Kamal	November 18, 2017
47	8	Ghada Abdel Razek	Tahra Hamimich	November 25, 2017
48	9	Maged el-Masry	Jannat	December 2, 2017
49	10	Mido	Hamdi Betchan	December 2, 2017
50	11	Ahmed El Sakka	MTM	December 16, 2017
51	12	Shams	Shams	December 23, 2017
52	13	Arwa Gouda	Fabrika	December 30, 2017
53	14	Mohamed Ramadan	Mohamed Ramadan	January 6, 2018

=== Specials ===
Title	Original release date
"Best of Season 3"	June 20, 2017
