= Ahmed El Sakka =

Egyptian actor (born 1973)

- أحمد السقا
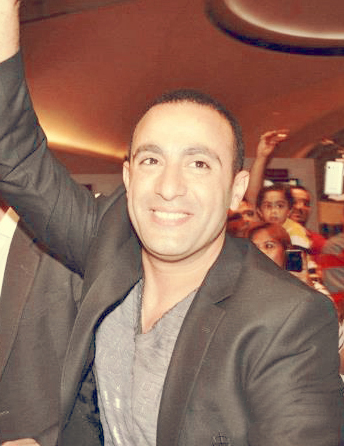
- El Sakka in 2012
- Born: Ahmed Mohamed Salah El Din El Sakka; March 1, 1973 (age 53); Cairo, Egypt
- Other name: Ahmed
- Education: Academy of Arts; Higher Institute of Dramatic Arts
- Occupation: Actor
- Years active: 1993–present
- Height: 1.73 m (5 ft 8 in)
- Spouse: Maha Al-Saghir (m. 1999) Divorce may 2025
- Children: 3

Ahmed Mohamed Salah El Din El Sakka (Arabic: أحمد محمد صلاح الدين السقا; born March 1, 1973) is an Egyptian actor. He is known to be one of the most popular Egyptian actors in the last 25 years and his style of acting is known for action roles and doing dangerous stunts without any stunt double.

== Early life ==
The son of theatre director Salah El Sakka, Ahmed El Sakka studied in Academy of Arts and graduated from The Higher Institute of Dramatic Arts in 1993.

== Career ==
Early in his acting career, he appeared in popular series like Al Nawa (1991) with Fardous Abdel Hamid, Alf Leila Wa Leila (One Thousand and One Nights, 1995) and Nesf Rabeea El-Akhar (1996) with Yehia El-Fakharany, W Man Allazi La Yoheb Fatma? (And Who Does not Love Fatima?, 1996) with Ahmed Abdelaziz and Shereen Seif El-Nasr, Tarweed El-Sharesa (Taming the Fierce, 1996) with Athar El-Hakim, a major role in Rodda Qalbi (1998), the adaptation of the original film Rodda Qalbi (Return My Heart, 1957), playing the role of Hussein, which was previously played by Salah Zulfikar in the original film, and a major role in Zawag Ala Wark Solifan (1998). El Sakka also appeared in a lot of films such as Leila Sakhina (A Hot Night, 1995) with Nour El-Sherif and Ayam El-Sadat (The Days of Sadat, 2001) with Ahmed Zaki.

The role that introduced him to a large audience was a co-starring role with actor Mohamed Henedi in Sa'edi fe el gama'a el amrekiya (An Upper Egyptian at the American University, 1998). It is an Arabic movie about a farmer who entered the American University in the city. The following year, he co-starred with Mohamed Henedi in Hamam fi Amsterdam (Hamam in Amsterdam, 1999), but in a larger role of the tough guy, which seemed to be his role in most of his hit movies afterwards. El Sakka also co-starred with Henedi in the two plays Alabanda (1998) and Afroto (1999). El Sakka's first starring role in cinema was in Short W Fanelah W Cap (Short, Fanelah & Cap, 2000) with Sherif Mounir, Ahmed Eid, Dalia Mostafa and the newcomer at that time Nour, achieving a huge financial success, with El Sakka winning Best Actor Award at Cairo International Film Festival. In 2001, he starred in Africano with Mona Zaki, which made a huge success and grossed 8 million EGP. El Sakka made a cameo role in Rasha Gareaa (Dare to give, 2001) and voiced Milo in the Arabic version of the animated film Atlantis: The Lost Empire (2001). His next films were all action movies where he played the main character. Probably, the most famous of these movies is Mafia (2002), which was a big success for El Sakka and is considered by many as one of the best action actors in the history of Egyptian movies. The film, which also starred Mostafa Shaban, Ahmed Rizk and Mona Zaki, grossed about 13 million EGP. In 2003, El Sakka co-starred in the play Keda Ok (That's Ok) with Sherif Mounir, Hany Ramzy, Mona Zaki and Yasmin Abdulaziz. He made a starring role in Tito (2004) with Hanan Tork and Khaled Saleh, which grossed 11.5 million EGP. He made a guest role in Leqaa ala al hawaa (2004), starring Yousra, and a voice role in the beginning of Sana Oula Nasb (First Year of Deception, 2004).

In 2005, El Sakka starred in Italia's War with Nelly Karim and grossed about 13 million EGP. also he was a cameo in Hamada Yal'ab (Hamada is Playing, 2005). In 2006, he starred with Mona Zaki again in An El Ashk We El Hawa (About Love and Passion), which also starred Menna Shalabi and Tarek Lotfy. The film was a Box-office bomb and grossed only 9 million EGP. El Sakka appeared in the part 1 and 2 of Lahazat Harega (Critical Moments, 2007) and in 2007, he starred in 2 films, Taymour and Shafika and The Island. In the first one, he played a private security guard and the film grossed 17 million EGP, and in the last one, he played The Outlaw Mansour El Hefny, who challenged a corrupt policeman, and the film grossed 22 million EGP. The Island, which based on the story of The Emperor of An Nikhaylah, Ezzat Hanafi, received an Academy Award for Best International Feature Film nomination but did not win. In 2009, El Sakka played the titular role of Ibrahim Labyad, which was one of the Egyptian «popular culture films» that received criticism, praise, and mixed reviews about the nature of society in it. Although it was criticized for the scenes of blood and bullying, the film grossed 12 million EGP. It was screened at the International Market of Cannes Film Festival.

In 2010, El Sakka appeared in two movies, The Dealer and Ibn Alqonsol (The Consul's Son). The Dealer, which also starred Khaled El Nabawy and Mai Selim, grossed only 5 million EGP in 5 weeks before its drawing from cinema. Ibn Alqonsol, starred El Sakka, Ghada Adel and Khaled Saleh, grossed 14 million EGP. El Sakka was a cameo in Sameer W Shaheer W Baheer (Sameer, Shaheer & Baheer) and Ayza Atgawez (I Want to Get Married). He starred in Khotout Hamra (Red Lines, 2012), which was released in Ramadan. In 2012, he starred opposite Ahmed Ezz in The Benefit and the film made 21 million EGP. The film was based on a story happened in 2010 in Sinai. El Sakka starred alongside Dorra in Papa in 2012, grossing 12 million EGP. In 2014, he reprised his role as Mansour El Hefny in The Island 2, which grossed 36 million EGP, making it the highest-grossing film in the history of Egyptian cinema at that time, until the release of Laf We Dawaran (Flimflam, 2016), which grossed 43 million EGP.

In 2015, El Sakka starred in Thahab Wa Awda (Roundtrip) and released in Ramadan. Thahab Wa Awda, which also starred Injy El Mokkaddem, Magdy Kamel, Yasser Galal, Jamil Awwad and his wife Juliet Awwad, was based on one of intelligence stories that happened in 2012. In 2016, El Sakka co-starred with Sherif Mounir, Nour, Mona Zaki and Mervat Amin in 30 Years Ago and the film grossed more than 23 million EGP. El Sakka's 2017 movie Horob Edterary (Forced Escape) grossed 55 million EGP. It also starred Amir Karara, Ghada Adel and Mostafa Khater. In Ramadan 2017, El Sakka starred in Alhisan Al'aswad (The Black Horse), which also starred Yasmine Sabri and Shery Adel. He appeared in Harb Karmouz (Karmouz War) and Rahim, both in 2018. He starred in 2019 Ramadan series Weld El-Ghalaba (Son of the Poor) with Mai Omar and Injy El Mokkaddem.

El Sakka co-presented with Razan Moughrabi the 2020 Ramadan program Eghlab El Sakka (Beat El Sakka). He co-starred with Amir Karara in Nasl El Aghrab (Offspring of Strangers, 2021), which had a huge criticism and ridicule, making the United Media Services stop dealing with Mohamed Sami, the director and writer of the series. El Sakka played a major role in 200 Geneh (200 pounds, 2021), after 4 years of absence from the cinema since his movie Horob Edterary (2017). 200 Geneh grossed 8 million EGP only. El Sakka received GFF's Career Achievement Award at the fifth El Gouna Film Festival. In 2022, he starred in Al Ekhtiar 3 (The Choice 3) alongside Ahmed Ezz, Karim Abdel Aziz and Yasser Galal.

In 2024 El Sakka played a lead role in the television series El Atawla. The series found tremendous success.

An official promotional video for the second season of the series ‘‘Al-Atawla’’ dropped and within just 24 hours of being released on social media, video surpassed 30 million views, reflecting the show’s strong audience engagement and considerable anticipation for the new season. The second season gained success and was one of the most viewed television shows in Ramadan 2025.

== Personal life ==
El Sakka married the daughter of the make-up artist and hairdresser Mohamed Al Sagheer, Maha Al Sagheer, on November 17, 1999. They had 3 children, 2 sons and a daughter.

El Sakka known for his love of horses and their breeding, as he owns a lot of horses and has an excellent skills of horse riding and training it. He has Arabian horse stable in Nazlet El-Semman. His hobbies are: horse riding, shooting, football, singing, writing songs and traveling.

El Sakka is a Stunt performer and he got injured in a lot of his films. He declared in Lamis Elhadidy's program Kelma Akhira that while shooting Short W Fanelah W Cap and after he jumped in the sea, the sharks would have eaten him. He stayed fixed in his place in the water and didn't swim; because the shark think that the human who swims is similar to the dolphin, so it will attack on him. He continued that he remained standing in the water until they shot the scene. While shooting Mafia, he cut off his cruciate ligament and got a lot of wounds because of many sand dunes in a mountain, in addition, he almost drowned in a scene, according to what he said in Sahebat El-Sa'da. In Africano and while making an ambush to the lion by tying a slaughtered chicken with a rope connected to a hole where the lion was supposed to fall, then El Sakka will come down to him, the rope that tied him up while going down was almost cut off and he almost died. And in Ukraine while shooting Taymour and Shafika, the fire caught his clothes. El Sakka lost temporarily his eyesight while shooting El-Jazeera, due to splinters from starting pistol entered his left eye, resulting an explosion in his eyeball and its bleeding. He was taken to hospital for an urgent surgery and after a few days, he began regaining his eyesight gradually. While shooting Ibrahim Labyad at the location of National Democratic Party in Cairo Citadel, El Sakka got injured in his foot when he came down the stairs, because of a sprain in his ankle, making the filming of the movie was postponed. The scene of his body set on fire was really, as he was wearing a suit that isolate the fire for 11 seconds. After 11 seconds, he didn't hear the scene designer telling him to get down on the ground, so the scene designer hit him on the head until he fell to the ground and put out the fire. Marwan Hamed, the director of the film, wanted to re-shoot the scene, but in a simpler way. After shooting The Dealer, El Sakka discovered a cruciate ligament injury that required an emergency surgery, but he was recovered after a while. Also in El-Jazeera 2, he was badly injured.

== Filmography ==
=== Films ===
Year	Movie	Role	Notes
1994	Hoda Wa Maali Al Wazeer		
1995	A Hot Night	Cars Ostler	
1995	The Ferryman	Salah	
1996	Harmonica	Saif	
1997	Guard Duty	Mohsen	
1998	Saeedi Fi El Gamaa El Amrekiia	Ali	
1999	Hammam Fi Amsterdam	Adriano	
2000	Short we Fanellah we Cap	Khalid Kabo	
2001	Days of Sadat	Atef El Sadat	Cameo
2001	Africano	Bader	
2001	Dare to give		Cameo
2001	Atlantis: The Lost Empire	Milo	Arabic version
2002	Mafia	Hussain/Tarek	
2004	Tito	Taher "Tito" Abdel Hai Saleem	
2004	First Year of Deception		Voice role
2005	Italia's War	Yassin Tag Yassin	
2005	Hamada Yal'ab		Cameo
2006	An El Eshq Wel Hawa	Omar	
2007	Taymour and Shafika	Taymour	
2007	The Island	Mansour El Hefni	
2008	Ala Ganb Ya Asta		Cameo
2009	Ibrahim Labyad	Ibrahim Labyad	
2010	The Dealer	Yousef El Sheikh	
2010	Ibn El Konsol	Essam/Nasser Fathi Al-Samak	
2010	Sameer, Shaheer & Baheer		Cameo
2012	The Deal	Hamza	
2012	Baba	Dr.Hazem	
2013	Over My Dead Body		Cameo
2014	The Island 2	Mansour El Hefni	
2016	30 Years Ago	Emad	
2017	Horrob Edtrary	Adham	
2018	Karmouz War	The judge	Cameo
2019	Sab'e Alboromba	himself	Cameo
2019	The Money	The bodybuilding coach	Cameo
2021	200 Pounds	Hassan	
2022	The Spider	Hassan	
2024	Aserb: The Squadron	Ali El-Masry	
2025	Ahmed and Ahmed	Ahmed	
2026	Take Care of Yourself	Alaa	
2026	Libon group		

Key
†	Denotes films that have not yet been released

=== Television ===
Year(s)	Title	Role	Notes	Ref.
1991	Al nawwa (mini series)			
1996	Nesf Rabie' Al-Akhar	Essam		
1996	Tareek Al Ahlam			
1996	Wa Mn Allazi La Youheb Fatima?	Emad		
1997	Zeezinya	Fathi		
2006	The Cinderella			
2009	Super Henedi	Cameo		
2010	Ayza Atgawez	Raed		
2012	Khotot Hamra	Hosam		
2013	Amir and the journey of legends	Salah aldin		
2017	Al hissan Al aswad	Ahmed		
2018	Raheem	Ahmed		
2019	Weld Al Ghalabah	Issa		
2021	Outsider bloodline	Assad		
2022	Yahya and kanouz	The actor voices historical pharaonic figures, specifically King Ahmose I and King Thutmose III		
2020-2022	The Choice	Mostafa		
2023	War	Othman		
2024	The last round (mini series)	Yehia. Also nicknamed shageeh		
2024-2025	Al atawla	Nasser		

=== Podcast series ===
Year(s)	Title	Role	Notes	Ref.
2023	War	Hero		

== Awards and nominations ==
Year	Award	Category	Nominated work	Result	Ref.
2002	The Feature Film Festival Award	Best Actor	Africano	Won	
2008	The National Egyptian Film Festival Award	Best Actor	The Island	Won	
2008	Academy Award	Best International Feature Film	The Island	Nominated	
2014	Dear Guest Award	Best Actor of 2014	The Island 2	Won	
2016	Dear Guest Award	Best Actor of 2016	30 Years Ago	Won	
2017	The National Egyptian Film Festival Award	Best Actor	30 Years Ago	Nominated	
2019	Dear Guest Award	Best Television Actor	Son of the Poor	Won	
2019	Arab Star Festival Award	Best Actor of the Arab World	Son of the Poor	Won	
