= Movie star =

Celebrity famous for acting in films

A movie star (also known as a film star or cinema star) is an actor who is famous for their starring, or leading, roles in movies. The term is used for performers who are marketable stars as they become popular household names and whose names are used to promote movies, for example in trailers and posters. The most prominent movie stars are known in the industry as bankable stars.

== United States ==
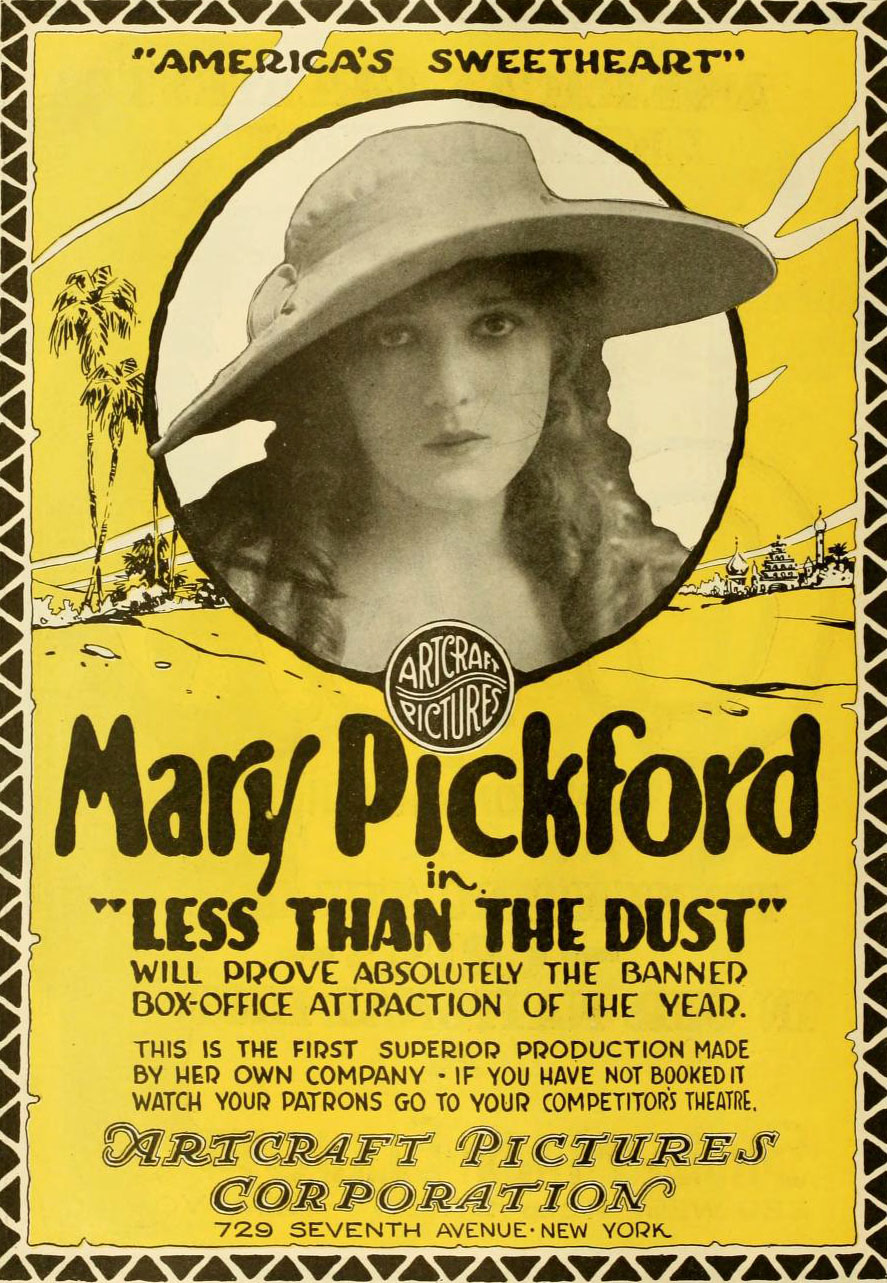
Poster advertising a 1916 film with Mary Pickford, one of the first movie stars

In the early days of silent movies, the names of the actors and actresses appearing in them were not publicized or credited because producers feared this would result in demands for higher salaries. However, audience curiosity soon undermined this policy. By 1909, actresses such as Florence Lawrence and Mary Pickford were already widely recognized, although the public remained unaware of their names. Lawrence was referred to as the “Biograph Girl” because she worked for D. W. Griffith's Biograph Studios, while Pickford was "Little Mary." In 1910, Lawrence switched to the Independent Moving Pictures Company, began appearing under her own name, and was hailed as "America's foremost moving picture star" in IMP literature. Pickford began appearing under her own name in 1911.

The Independent Moving Pictures Company promoted their "picture personalities", including Florence Lawrence and King Baggot, by giving them billing, credits and a marquee. Promotion in advertising led to the release of stories about these personalities to newspapers and fan magazines as part of a strategy to build brand loyalty for their company's actors and films. By the 1920s, Hollywood film company promoters had developed a "massive industrial enterprise" that "...peddled a new intangible—fame." Early Hollywood studios tightly controlled who was a movie star, as only they had the ability to place stars' names above the title; according to film historian Jeanine Basinger, this was done "only for economic reasons".

Hollywood "image makers" and promotional agents planted rumors, selectively released real or fictitious biographical information to the press, and used other gimmicks to create glamorous personas for actors. Publicists thus "created" the "enduring images" and public perceptions of screen legends such as James Dean, Judy Garland, Rock Hudson, Marilyn Monroe, and Grace Kelly. The development of this "star system" made fame "something that could be fabricated purposely, by the masters of the new 'machinery of glory'." However, regardless of how "...strenuously the star and their media handlers and press agents may ... try to 'monitor' and 'shape' it, the media and the public always play a substantial part in the image-making process." According to Madow, "fame is a 'relational' phenomenon, something that is conferred by others. A person can, within the limits of his natural talents, make himself strong or swift or learned. But he cannot, in this same sense, make himself famous, any more than he can make himself loved."

Madow goes on to point out "fame is often conferred or withheld, just as love is, for reasons and on grounds other than 'merit'." According to Sofia Johansson the "canonical texts on stardom" include articles by Boorstin (1971), Alberoni (1972) and Dyer (1979) that examined the "representations of stars and on aspects of the Hollywood star system". Johansson writes that "more recent analyses within media and cultural studies (e.g. Gamson 1994; Marshall 1997; Giles 2000; Turner, Marshall and Bonner 2000; Rojek 2001; Turner 2004) have instead dealt with the idea of a pervasive, contemporary, 'celebrity culture'." In the analysis of the celebrity culture, "fame and its constituencies are conceived of as a broader social process, connected to widespread economic, political, technological and cultural developments."

In the 1980s and 1990s, entertainment companies began using stars for a range of publicity tactics including press releases, movie junkets, and community activities. These promotional efforts are targeted and designed using market research, to increase the predictability of success of their media ventures. In some cases, publicity agents may create “provocative advertisements” or make an outrageous public statement to trigger public controversy and thereby generate "free" news coverage. Movie studios employed performers under long-term contracts. They developed a star system as a means of promoting and selling their movies. "Star vehicles" were filmed to display the particular talents and appeal of the most popular movie stars of the studio.

== Egypt ==
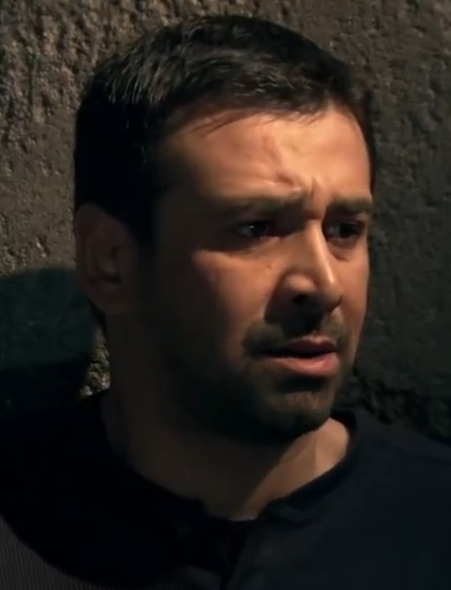
Karim Abdel Aziz

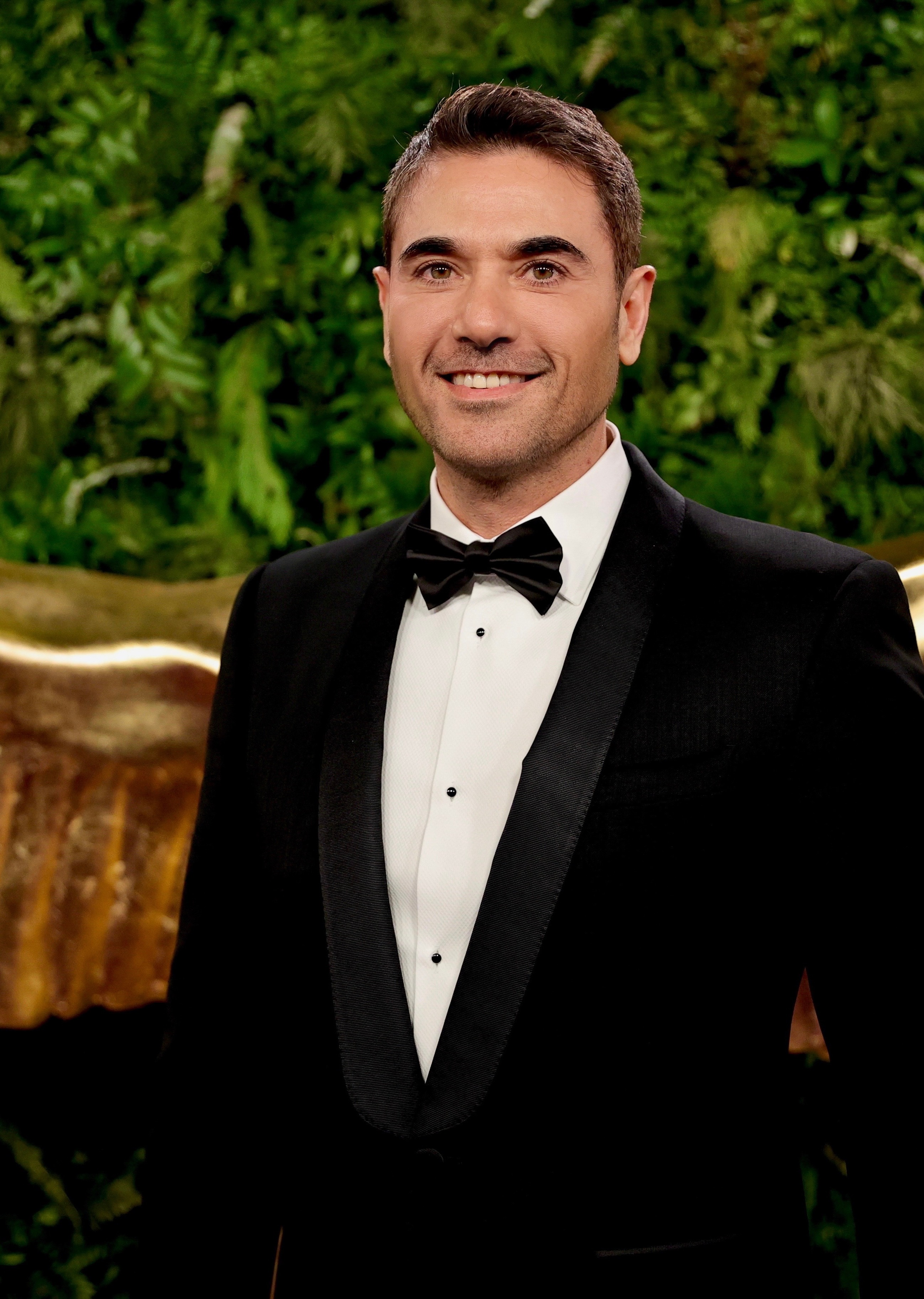
Ahmed Ezz

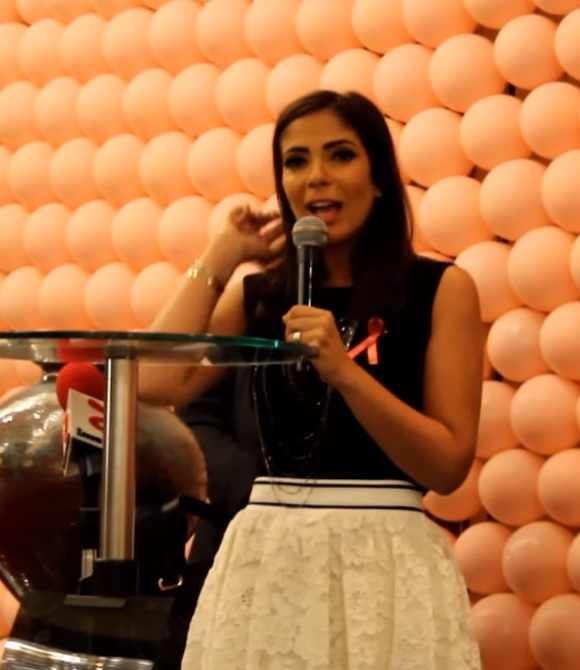
Mona Zaki

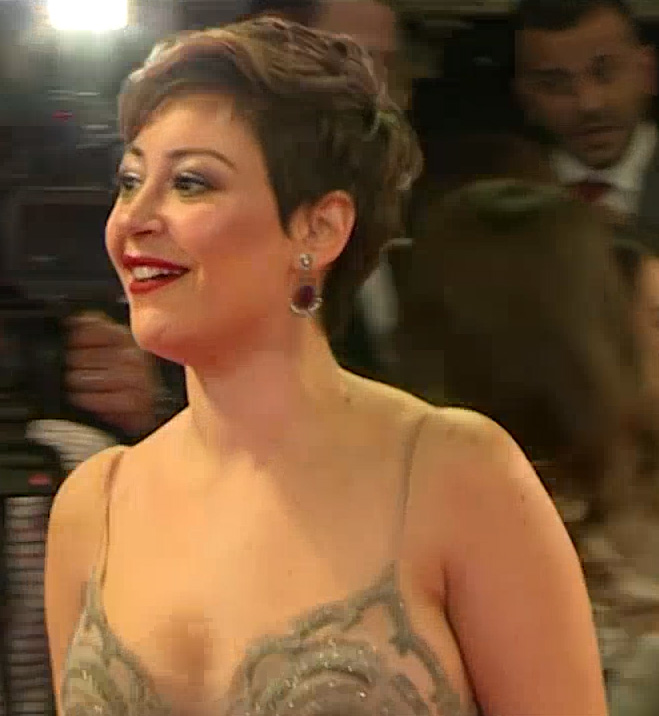
Menna Shalabi

Egypt's famous movie stars in the 20th century include Youssef Wahbi, Fatima Rushdi, Leila Mourad, Anwar Wagdi, Naguib El-Rihani, Taheyya Kariokka, Ismail Yassine, Faten Hamama, Salah Zulfikar, Shadia, Soad Hosny, Shoukry Sarhan, Rushdy Abaza, Nadia Lutfi, Ahmed Mazhar, Sanaa Gamil, Ahmed Zaki, Nour El Sherif, Mervat Amin, Adel Emam, Naglaa Fathi, Yousra, Mahmoud Abdel Aziz, Hussein Fahmy, Sherihan, Mahmoud Yassin and Samir Ghanem.

In the 21st century; Mona Zaki, Ahmed Ezz, Menna Shalabi, Ahmed El Sakka, Karim Abdel Aziz, Sherif Mounir, Nelly Karim, Mohamed Henedi, Mohamed Saad, Donia Samir Ghanem, Ahmed Helmy, Ghada Adel, Khaled El-Nabawy, Ruby, Maged el-Kedwany and many more considered Egyptian Cinema movie stars.

== Asia ==
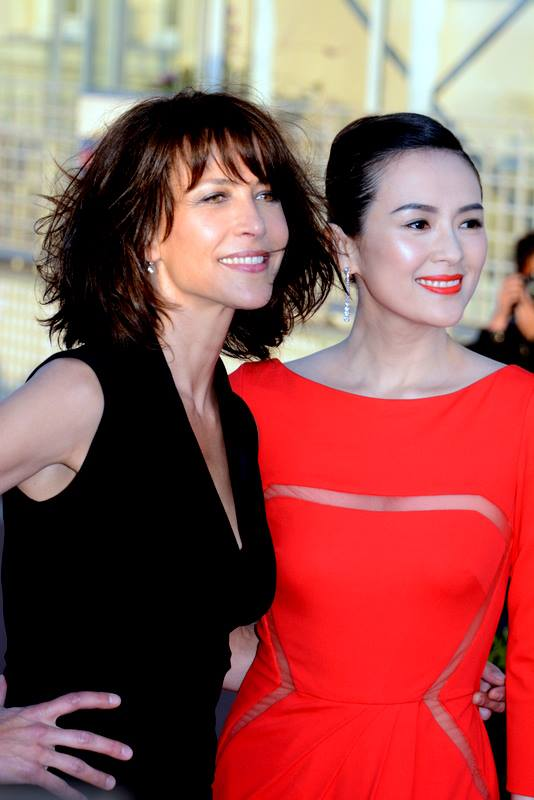
Two movie stars, Sophie Marceau and Zhang Ziyi, respectively from France and China, at the Cabourg Film Festival in June 2014

Movie stars enjoy considerable prominence in Asia. In Asian film industries, many movies often run on the weight of the star's crowd pulling power more than any other intrinsic aspect of film making.

=== China ===
A number of Chinese film actors have become some of the most popular movie stars in Eastern Asia, and several are also well known in the Western world. They include Jackie Chan, Jet Li, Chow Yun-fat, Stephen Chow, Sammo Hung, Gong Li, Ziyi Zhang, Maggie Cheung, and the late Bruce Lee.

=== India ===
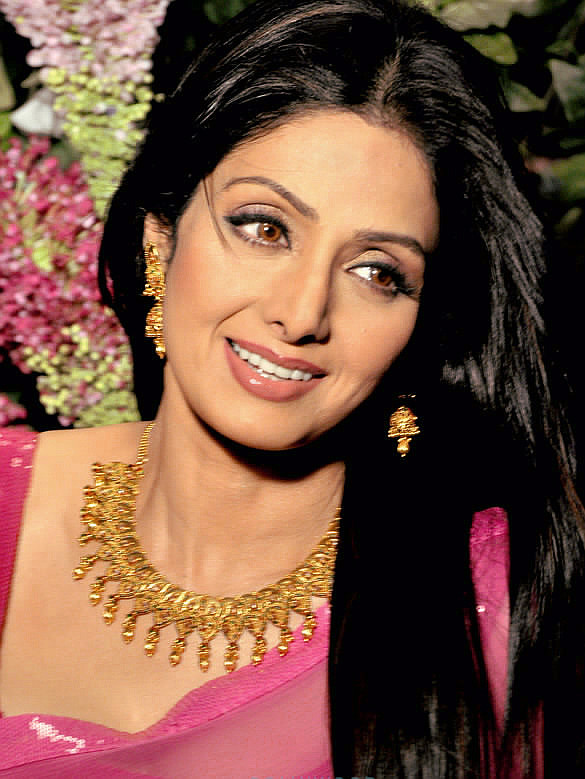
Dilip Kumar and Sridevi, stars of Indian cinema

The Indian film industry consists of various regional cinema industries. One regional cinema, the Hindi film industry, commonly known as Bollywood, has its own set of rules in this respect. There are often superstars in this region who command premium pay commensurate with their box office appeal.

Some mainstream Indian movie stars, like the Khans of Bollywood (Aamir Khan, Shah Rukh Khan, Salman Khan,), Madhubala, Raj Kapoor, Nargis, Mithun Chakraborty, Amitabh Bachchan, Arjun Rampal and Aishwarya Rai gained international fame across Asia and Eastern Europe. For example, Bollywood films were popular in the Soviet Union, more so following the restriction of Hollywood films, and occasionally even more popular than domestic Soviet films. Indian actors like Raj Kapoor, Nargis and Mithun Chakroborty were household names in the Soviet Union, with films such as Awaara (1951) and Disco Dancer (1982) drawing more than 60 million viewers in the country. The Hindi film actors Raj Kapoor and Aamir Khan also became very popular in China, with films such as Awaara, 3 Idiots (2009), and Dangal (2016), one of the top 20 highest-grossing films in China.

=== Southeast-Asian archipelago ===
==== 20th century ====
The film industry of the Indonesian Archipelago (also known as Nusantara) consists primarily of film industries which made the cinema of Malaysia, Indonesia, the Philippines, and Singapore. Over the past century, these four cinemas have collaborated on a number of projects. A number of actors from this region have become some of the most sought-after movie stars in southeast Asia, commonly in Indonesian-Malay-speaking countries. Many of these movie star have acted in all four countries

In the Philippines, their most recognizable thespian consisted of Nora Aunor, Vilma Santos, Sharon Cuneta, Maricel Soriano, Christopher de Leon, Joseph Estrada, Jose Padilla, Fernando Poe Sr., Fernando Poe Jr., Rudy Fernandez, Dolphy, Palito, Ramon Zamora, among many more. Philippines first international celebrity in the movie star category was Ernesto dela Cruz under the pseudonym Weng Weng, who in 1981 with his hit film the action comedy film For Your Height Only, became the world's first and shortest leading man standing at 2 foot 9 while even with a short lived career the international success of the film has not been topped locally.

Indonesia's movie stars include Rima Melati, Deddy Mizwar, Christine Hakim, Rano Karno, Benyamin Sueb, Rina Hasyim, and Suzzanna.

Malaysia's film celebrities include P. Ramlee, Yusof Haslam, Jins Shamsuddin, Michelle Yeoh, Eman Manan, and Alex Komang.

Singaporean stars include Fauziah Ahmad Daud, Nordin Ahmad, and Saadiah.

==== 21st century ====
Other, more recent movie stars include Romalis Syafril, Erra Fazira, Rosyam Nor, Shaheizy Sam and Maya Karin, from Malaysia; Nicholas Saputra, Vino G. Bastian, Dian Sastrowardoyo, Tora Sudiro, and Iko Uwais, from Indonesia; Claudine Baretto, Piolo Pascual, John Lloyd Cruz, Jericho Rosales, Aga Muhlach, Kristine Hermosa, Dingdong Dantes, and Bea Alonzo, from the Philippines; and a few from Singapore, such as Aaron Aziz and Adi Putra.

== See also ==
- Actor
- Celebrity
- Character actor
- Charisma
- Glamour
- Leading lady
- Leading man
- List of actors
- List of highest-grossing actors
- List of highest-paid film actors
- Matinée idol
- Sex symbol
- Star system (filmmaking)
- Superstar
- Typecasting
- Voice actor
