= The Emigrant (1994 film) =

- Directed by: Youssef Chahine
- Written by: Rafiq As-Sabban; Youssef Chahine
- Starring: Khaled El Nabawy; Hanan Tork; Mahmoud Hemida; Yousra; Safia El Emari
- Release dates: August 1994 (Locarno Film Festival); 8 March 1995 (France)
- Countries: Egypt, France
- Language: Egyptian Arabic

The Emigrant (Arabic: المهاجر, translit. Al Mohager) is a 1994 Egyptian film by Youssef Chahine. The film is listed in the Top 100 Egyptian films.

The release of this film, which is loosely based on the story of the Biblical Joseph, raised a storm of protest, since Islam forbids the visual representation of religious figures. This was despite the fact that Chahine changed the names of all of the characters and stripped the story of all its supernatural and miraculous elements. Joseph becomes Ram, Jacob becomes Adam, Potiphar becomes Amihar, and Potiphar's wife, unnamed in the Bible, becomes Simihit, the high priestess of the Cult of Amun. Joseph does not advance because of a miraculous ability to receive and interpret dreams, but because of his personal merits.

After achieving all necessary approvals from the censorship authorities, the film ran successfully in Egyptian cinema until a lawsuit initiated by a fundamentalist Islamist lawyer caused a temporary ban. After a year-long court battle, Chahine won the case, only to face a second ban resulting from a lawsuit initiated by a Christian lawyer who objected to the movie's many deviations from the Biblical account.

== Plot ==
In this film, young Ram is a thinker who has grown up in a primitive and superstitious society, hated by his brothers and suspected of sorcery. Dissatisfied with the nomadic lifestyle of his family, he dreams of traveling to Egypt to study agriculture. Forewarned by his weather knowledge, he saves the family's flocks from a destructive sandstorm, and manages to persuade his father to let him leave for Egypt. His older brothers travel with him, but at the shipping dock they tie him up, knock him out, and dump him into the hold of a boat traveling to Egypt. When he wakes up, he is discovered by the boat owner family, who intend to sell him as a slave. They let Ram know that this sale would be his opportunity to enter the service of a powerful family, since the man they wish to sell him to, Ozir, is assistant to Amihar, the military head of Thebes. Ram actively participates in the bargaining to get the best possible price for his purchase. His initial months as a slave are a disappointment, however, since he is assigned to assist in the mummification of bodies rather than learning about agriculture. Ram is not afraid to express his contempt for the Egyptian obsession with death and the preservation of one's mortal remains, and affirms his belief in one God and the immortality of the soul independent of one's body. Amihar is impressed by Ram's honesty, takes a personal liking to the young man, and gives Ram a chance to convert a barren stretch of land into a working farm. Through a combination of hard work, good mentoring, and a bit of luck, Ram is successful in this endeavor.

Ram becomes caught up in an intertwined mesh of sexual, political, and religious intrigues. Ram's relationship with Simihit and Amihar is far more complex than in the Biblical version of the story. Amihar is a eunuch, a former harem guard. His marriage to Simihit, former princess of a vanquished nation, was at first simply a political maneuver, but he later came to care deeply for her. Ram catches the eye of Simihit. As in the Bible, when Simihit is caught after making advances towards Ram, she tries to cover her tracks by accusing Ram of attempted rape. Amihar does not necessarily believe her. He asks Ram what happened, but Ram steadfastly defends Simihit's honor, leaving Amihar no choice but to have him thrown into prison. Simihit is deeply affected by Ram's willingness to accept prison rather than reveal her attempted infidelity and relents of her accusation, confessing the truth. After Ram's release, he becomes involved in a power struggle between the wealthy followers of Amun, chief of the traditional Egyptian pantheon, versus the oppressed followers of Aten, god of the monotheistic Atenist heresy. Although Simihit is a priestess of Amun, she is a secret convert to the Cult of Aten. Throughout these troubles, Ram is fiercely loyal to both Simihit and Amihar, and his loyalty is rewarded by his release from slavery. Over the subsequent years, he rises in stature, takes an Egyptian wife, and becomes a trusted adviser to Pharaoh. Severe famine strikes, and Joseph's brothers turn up asking for food. Ram toys with his brothers before revealing his identity, and they become reconciled. The movie ends with Ram and his family traveling back to his homeland and becoming reunited with his father.

== Technical details ==
The film runs 128 minutes, features a symphonic score by Mohamed Nouh, and mixes set and location shots, with a few special effects by Excalibur. Ramses Marzouk did the camera work, Rachida Abdel-Salam acted as film editor, Hamed Hemdan provided art direction, Nahed Nasrallah handled costume design, Dominique Hennequin handled sound, Walid Aouni performed choreography, and Ahmed Kassem acted as assistant director.
