= Ali Zouaoui =

Tunisian economist and politician

- Born: November 10, 1925
- Died: February 18, 1972 (aged 46)
- Occupations: Politician, Economist
- Known for: Administrator of Central Bank of Tunisia

Ali Zouaoui (Arabic: علي الزواوي; November 10, 1925 – February 18, 1972) was a Tunisian economist and politician.

== Career ==
He was a member of an old family which hailed from Hajeb El Ayoun, and studied law and economics in France. He was the chairman of Espérance Sportive de Tunis from 1968 to 1970. Then, he served as the governor of the Central Bank of Tunisia from 1970 to 1972; in the latter year he was killed in a traffic accident.

== Personal life ==
He married Soufiya Belkhodja, sister of the painter Néjib Belkhodja and daughter of Tunisian craftsmen, then Arlette Ravalec. He had two daughters and a son. He is the grandfather of the actress, Dorra Zarrouk.
