= Cottonil =

Egyptian underwear brand

- Native name: قطونيل
- Type: Private
- Industry: Textile, Clothing
- Founded: 1999
- Founder: Bassel Samakia
- Headquarters: Cairo, Egypt
- Area served: Middle East, Africa, Europe
- Products: Underwear, loungewear, socks, towels
- Website: cottonil.com

Cottonil (Arabic: قطونيل) is an Egyptian textile and clothing company specializing in the manufacture and distribution of undergarments, loungewear, and socks. Established in 1999, it is one of the largest underwear brands in Egypt, holding a significant share of the domestic market.

== History ==
Cottonil was founded in 1999 by Syrian businessman Bassel Samakia, who serves as the company's chairman. Capitalizing on Egypt's reputation for high-quality cotton, the company expanded from a local manufacturer to a dominant player in the Egyptian textile industry. By the late 2010s, industry reports indicated the company controlled approximately 50% of the local underwear market.

== Operations and products ==
The company operates several manufacturing facilities in Egypt, including plants in Gesr El Suez, 10th of Ramadan City, and Khanka. Its distribution network spans hundreds of direct retail branches and authorized distributors across Egypt.

Internationally, Cottonil exports to markets in Europe, the Middle East, and Africa. The company has established a presence in the Gulf region, with franchises and branches in Saudi Arabia and the United Arab Emirates.

Cottonil produces a wide range of cotton-based apparel for men, women, and children. Its primary product lines include:

- Underwear: Boxer shorts, briefs, and undershirts.
- Loungewear: Pajamas and home clothes.
- Hosiery: Socks and knitted goods.
- Bath: Bathrobes and towels.

== Marketing and controversies ==
Cottonil is known in Egypt for its high-budget advertising campaigns, particularly during the month of Ramadan, a prime television viewing season in the Arab world. These campaigns often feature prominent celebrities and catchy jingles.

However, the company's marketing strategies have occasionally sparked controversy regarding content standards:

- 2016 Suspension: The Egyptian Consumer Protection Agency (CPA) suspended a Cottonil advertisement for allegedly violating "public morals" and Egyptian traditions due to scenes deemed inappropriate for family viewing.
- 2020 Controversy: In April 2020, the company withdrew a Ramadan commercial featuring Jordanian actress Mais Hamdan after it faced a backlash on social media and criticism from members of parliament. The ad was criticized for its lyrics and content, which some viewers found suggestive. The company issued a statement apologizing to viewers and voluntarily stopped airing the commercial.

== Guinness World Record ==
In March 2018, Cottonil achieved a Guinness World Record for manufacturing the world's largest items of underwear. The event was part of a medical campaign titled "Be Sure" to raise awareness for prostate cancer. The record-breaking items were:

- A giant undershirt measuring 36.49 metres (119.7 ft) in length and 27.65 metres (90.7 ft) in width.
- Underpants measuring 18.09 metres (59.4 ft) in length and 25.36 metres (83.2 ft) in width.
