= The Traveller (2009 film) =

- Directed by: Ahmad Maher
- Written by: Ahmad Maher
- Produced by: Alberto Luna (producer)
- Starring: Omar Sharif; Khaled El Nabawy; Basma; Cyrine Abdelnour
- Cinematography: Marco Onorato
- Edited by: Tamer Ezzat
- Music by: Fathi Salama (original music)
- Production companies: Culture Development Fund (Egypt); Egyptian Ministry of Culture
- Distributed by: Paramount Pictures; Maxus Production
- Release date: 2009
- Running time: 125 minutes
- Country: Egypt
- Language: Egyptian Arabic

The Traveller (Egyptian Arabic: المسافر, romanized: El Mosafer) is a 2009 Egyptian film written and directed by Ahmed Maher. It stars Omar Sharif, Khaled El Nabawy, Basma and Cyrine Abdelnour.

The story takes place over three days in the life of Hassan, the octogenarian protagonist, played by Khaled El Nabawy as the young Hassan and Omar Sharif as the older Hassan. The three days of Hassan's life represent key events in modern Egyptian history: the first is the Nakba in 1948, the second is the 6 October War in 1973, and the third is 9/11 in 2001.

== Cast ==
- Omar Sharif
- Khaled El Nabawy
- Basma
- Cyrine Abdelnour
- Amr Waked
- Sherif Ramzy
- Dorra
- Alaa Morse
- Sanaa Taher

== Plot summary ==
Three crucial days in Hassan's life. First day. Autumn 1948, Port Said, Hassan's first day at work when he receives a telegram and decides to meet the beautiful and thrill-loving Nura by impersonating her long-distant fiancé. Hassan manages both to reach the cruise ship on which she is travelling and to charm her, until he impatiently rapes her and then accidentally sets the ship on fire. Second Day. Autumn 1973. Alexandria of Egypt. Hassan is in the city to meet Nadia, Nura's daughter, who is mourning her brother who has just died in a seaside accident. Hassan soon comes to believe he is Nadia's father, and helps engineer her marriage to a halfwit hanger-on. Third Day. Autumn 2001, Cairo. Hassan meets Alì, Nadia's son where he observes numerous similarities with the young man.
