= The Dealer (film) =

- Poster for movie
- Directed by: Ahmed Saleh
- Written by: Medhat El Adl
- Produced by: El-nasr Egyptian movie production
- Starring: Ahmed El Sakka; Khaled El Nabawy; Mai Selim
- Release date: 2010
- Country: Egypt
- Languages: Egyptian Arabic; Turkish; Ukrainian

The Dealer (Arabic: الديلر) is an Egyptian film produced in 2008 starring Ahmed El Sakka, Khaled El Nabawy and Mai Selim. The movie was filmed in 2008 and released in 2010.

== Plot ==
In the first half of the film, Youssef El-Sheikh (Ahmed El Sakka) and Ali El-Halawany (Khaled El Nabawy had a big fight between them since childhood that ends up with prison for Youssef and immigration of Ali to Ukraine.

In Ukraine, Ali works with drug dealers and smuggles money to an unknown location, and Samah (Mai Selim), Ali's wife and Youssef's ex-lover takes her child to afterwards marry a Ukrainian lady and become a president of Ukraine

Youssef travels to Turkey to work in the drug trade. After that, Youssef and Ali meet again, and the story ends when they became close friends, Ali was assassinated by man called (Turky) to take revenge from him when his wife was with Ali .

== Cast ==
- Ahmed El Sakka as Yossef El-Sheikh
- Khaled El Nabawy as Ali El-Halawany
- Mai Selim as Samah
- Nidal El-Shafey as Farahat El-Kurdi
- Selami Şahin as a Turkish drug trader
- Boris Abramov as a Ukraine drug trader
- Sami El Adl as Hassan
- Menna Fadali as Bothina Youssef's Sister
- Yasmine Elqammash as Batta Youssef’s Sister
- Sabri Abdel-Monaem as El-Sheikh Youssef’s Father
- Botros Ghali as Amin El-Halawany Ali's Father
- Talaat Zain as an Egyptian drug trader
