= The Island (2007 film) =

- Arabic: الجزيرة
- Directed by: Sherif Arafa
- Written by: Mohamed Diab
- Produced by: Mohamed Hassan Ramzy
- Starring: Ahmed El Sakka; Mahmoud Yacine; Hend Sabry; Khaled El Sawy
- Music by: Omar Khairat
- Distributed by: Rotana Studios; El Nasr Films
- Release date: December 18, 2007 (Egypt)
- Running time: 143 minutes
- Country: Egypt
- Language: ِArabic
- Budget: 16,000,000 L.E
- Box office: 22,000,000 L.E

The Island (Arabic: الجزيرة, romanized: El-Gezeira) is a 2007 action-thriller Egyptian film starring Ahmed El Sakka, Mahmoud Yacine, Hend Sabri and Khaled Elsawy and directed by Sherif Arafa. In upper Egypt, a gang war for leadership leads to a massacre, killing the mother and wife of the young gang boss and most of his clan. He avenges them, and controls the whole island for trade in weapons and drugs, and makes illegal deals with the police.

== Plot ==
A film about a community of Upper Egypt residents living in El Gezira (the Island). They have their own set of rules, ethics and traditions. But they also plant drugs and buy arms from Sudan. The officer in charge of the region turns a blind eye to these happenings, and in the beginning, the government takes no heed of the Island. At the start of the film, we witness the death of the old 'Kabir el Gezira' (the island's ruler), leaving the land to his son Mansour. The first half follows Mansour as he takes control of his land and must deal with a band of other drug lords who are greedy to take control of the island. The second half of the film deals with the political conflict. It follows the government's side of things (which finally decides to take action) at the same time as Mansour's side, as the two react to each other's threats and the conflict escalates.

== Cast ==
- Ahmed El Sakka as Mansour
- Mahmoud Yacine as The old boss
- Khaled El Sawy as Roshdy
- Mahmoud Abdel Moghny as Tarek
- Hend Sabry as Karima
- Bassem Samra as Hassan
- Asser Yassin as Mahmoud Nagih
- Ashraf Meslehi as Hemdan
- Zeina as Faiqa, Mansour's wife
- Abdel Rahman Abou Zahra as Police General Fouad
- Mohamed Sherif Hassan as The child Ali

== Awards and honors ==
Egypt's 2009 Academy Awards official submission to Foreign-Language Film category
