= Tito (2004 film) =

- Poster for the Tito film
- Directed by: Tarek Al Eryan
- Written by: Tarek Al Eryan
- Starring: Ahmed El Sakka; Hanan Tork; Amr Waked; Khaled Saleh; Ashraf Meselhy
- Music by: Hesham Nazih
- Release date: 2004
- Country: Egypt
- Language: Arabic

Tito (Arabic: تيتو) is an Egyptian action movie produced in 2004 starring Ahmed El Sakka, Hanan Tork, Amr Waked, Ashraf Dwedar, and Khaled Saleh. It was directed by Tarek Al Eryan.

== Plot ==
The movie is about a criminal who, as a young boy, didn't find anyone or anything to help or guide him, turning him into a vicious, yet kind hearted, criminal.

== Cast ==
- Ahmed El Sakka - Tito
- Hanan Tork - Nour
- Amr Waked - Faris
- Khaled Saleh - Refaat El Sokkary
- Ashraf Meselhy
