= Papa (2012 Egyptian film) =

- Directed by: Akram Farid
- Written by: Karim Fahmy
- Produced by: Walid El Kurdi
- Starring: Ahmed El Sakka; Dorra Zarrouk; Nicole Saba
- Production company: New Century Production
- Distributed by: New Century Production
- Release date: August 12, 2012
- Country: Egypt
- Language: Egyptian Arabic

Papa (Arabic: بابا, translit.Baba) is a 2012 Egyptian comedy film written by Karim Fahmy, directed by Akram Farid, and produced by Walid El Kurdi for New Century Production. The film stars Ahmed El Sakka, Dorra Zarrouk, Nicole Saba and Salah Abdallah, and was first released in Egypt on 12 August 2012.

== Plot ==
Hazem (Ahmed Al Sakka) is a successful gynaecologist who falls in love with Farida (Dorra Zarrouk) who works as an interior designer. When they get married, Hazem discovers his inability to father children and the two seek a medical solution through in vitro fertilization…

== Cast ==
- Ahmed El Sakka as Hazem
- Dorra Zarrouk as Farida
- Nicole Saba
- Salah Abdallah
- Edward
- Soliman Eid
- Lotfy Labib
