= Salah Abdallah =

Egyptian actor (born 1955)

- صلاح عبد الله
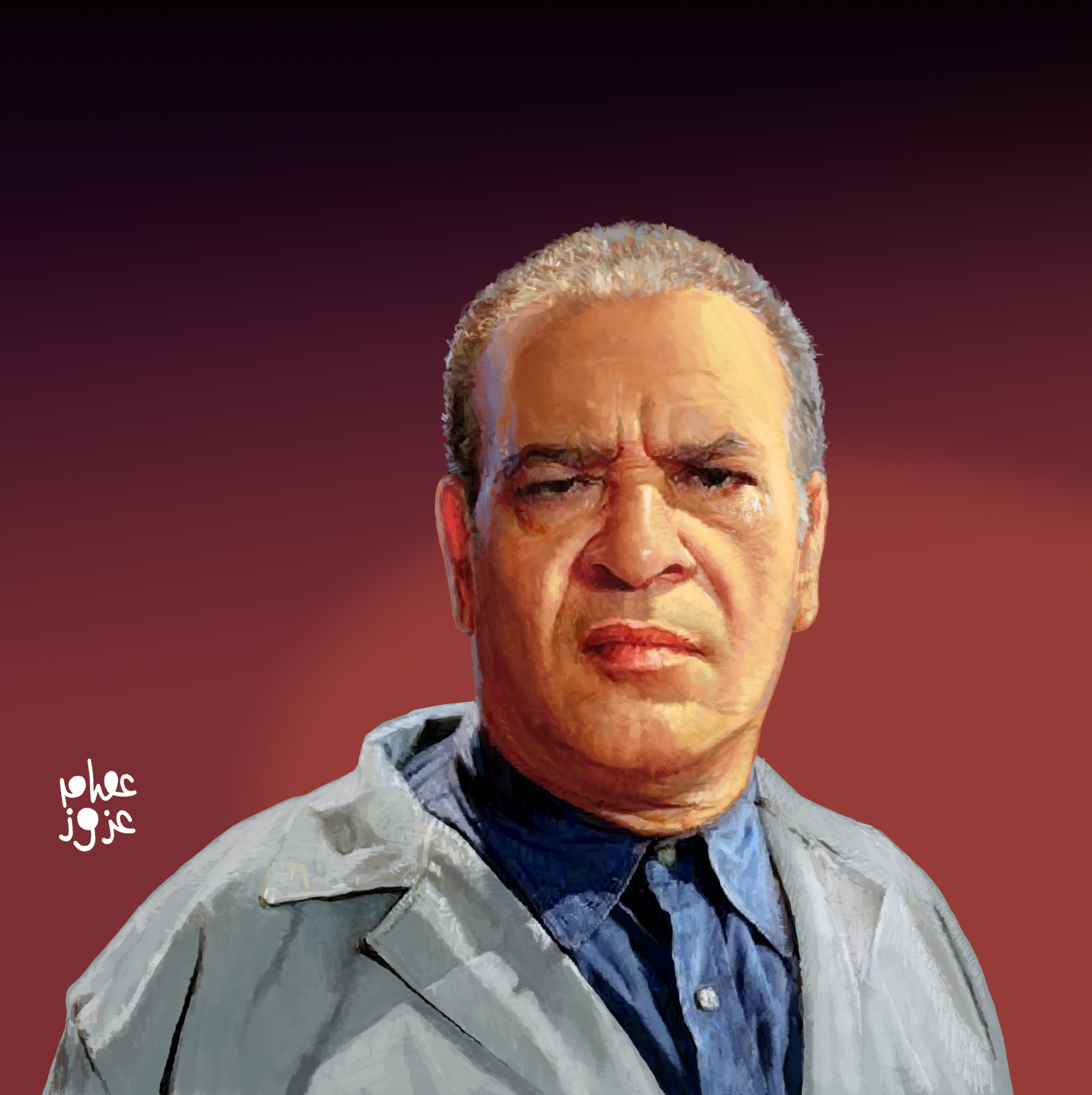
- Born: January 25, 1955 (age 70); Cairo, Egypt
- Occupation: Actor
- Children: 3

Salah Abdallah (born January 25, 1955) is an Egyptian actor.

He was born in the Boulaq district of Cairo, Egypt.

His lifetime achievements in acting were celebrated at the 36th annual Alexandria International Film Festival in 2020.

== Filmography ==
=== Film ===
Year(s)	Title	Role	Notes	Ref.
1988	Escape	Forger Mr. Makhzanji		
2001	A Citizen, A Detective and A Thief	—		
2003	Film Hindi	—		
2010	Messages from the Sea	Hajj Hashim		
2012	The Deal	—		
2012	Papa	—		
2012	After the Battle	Haj Abdallah		
2016	30 Years Ago	Hassan		
2021	Mousa	Yehia's father		

=== Television ===
Year(s)	Title	Role	Notes	Ref.
2005	Raya and Sakina	—		
2010	Al-Gama'a	—		
2014	El Excellence	—		
2014–2015	Saraya Abdeen	—		
2020	The Thief	—		
