= Selami Şahin =

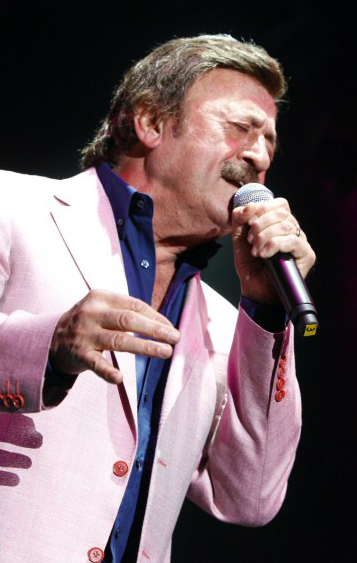
- Şahin in 2012

Background information
- Born: 15 August 1948 (age 78); Yayladağı, Hatay, Turkey
- Genres: Arabesque, pop, world
- Occupations: Musician, singer, songwriter, producer, actor
- Years active: 1966–present
- Label: Lider Müzik
- Website: selamisahin.com.tr

Selami Şahin (born 15 August 1948) is a Turkish musician, singer, and songwriter.

== Life and career ==
Şahin's works have been performed in different languages by artists from European and Middle Eastern countries. He was born to a mother of Egyptian descent settled in Hatay and a Turkish father. He knows not only Turkish but also Egyptian Arabic as mother tongues. Owing to his mother, he speaks in Egyptian Arabic. Since Egyptian Arabic is his mother tongue, he has also participated in joint projects with many famous figures such as Ghada Ragab and Enrico Macias. As a commentator, composer and songwriter, he continued his musical life and later he started art directing and vocal coaching.

In 1980 he founded the music production company Lider Müzik.

In 2011, when he celebrated his 45th year of career, and his works, which were previously covered by many artists, were put with acoustic and new arrangements and in his album Mahzen .

Besides his music career, he has also had an acting career and starred in several feature films. One of the most prominent movies that he starred in was Runaway Mummy (2002), which was co-produced by Turkey and Egypt and released in 22 countries. It was also the first Turkish film to be included at the 6th Hollywood Film Festival, and Şahin's performance received positive reception.

In 2012, he appeared in a commercial for Akbank and performed his song "Sensiz Olmuyor".

== Discography ==
Year	Album title	Label
1966–1976	45`likler	
1975	Yıllar Sonra Yine	Taç Plak
1976	Unutulmayan Eserler	Taç Plak
1981	Bağrımdaki Ateş	Lider Müzik
1982	Tapılacak Kadınsın	Lider Müzik
1983	Seninle Başım Dertte	Lider Müzik
1985	Hastayım Sana	Lider Müzik
1987	İyi Düşün Sevgilim	Lider Müzik
1988	Seni Çok Seviyorum	Lider Müzik
1989	İşim Gücüm Seni Sevmek	Lider Müzik
1990	Başımın Tatlı Belası	Lider Müzik
1992	Şaşırttın Beni	Lider Müzik
1994	Özledim Her Şeyini	Lider Müzik
1995	İlle de Sen	Lider Müzik
1997	Şarkılarım ve Ben (Nostalji)	Lider Müzik
1999	2000`e Merhaba	Lider Müzik
2004	İyi ki Varsın	Lider Müzik
2009	Dayman (Daima)	Lider Müzik
2010	Ben Bir Tek Kadın Sevdim	Lider Müzik
2011	Mahzen	Lider Müzik
2018	‘’mansetaksh leh’’	

== Awards ==
Year	Category	Song	Award	
1975	Song of the Year	Sen Mevsimler Gibisin	4th Golden Butterfly Awards	Won
1977	Golden Pencil Award	Dostlarım (İçkim & Sigaram)	-	Won
1978	The Year’s 10 Most Popular Songs	Sensiz Olmuyor	Milliyet Newspaper Awards	Won
1979	The Year’s 10 Most Popular Songs	Özlem Rıhtımı	Milliyet Newspaper Awards	Won
1980	The Year’s 10 Most Popular Songs	Rüzgar	Milliyet Newspaper Awards	Won
1994	Gold Composition Award	Özledim	İstanbul FM Radio Gold Awards (İFA)	Won
1995	The Year’s 10 Most Popular Songs	Özledim	Milliyet Newspaper Awards	Won
2012	Honorary Award	-	39th Golden Butterfly Awards	Won

== Filmography ==
Year	Film
1970	Köyün Beş Güzeli
1981	Bağrımdaki Ateş
1985	Kaderi Zorlama
2002	Mumya Firarda
2010	El Dealer

== See also ==
- List of Turkish musicians
