= Amr Waked =

Egyptian actor (born 1973)

- عمرو واكد
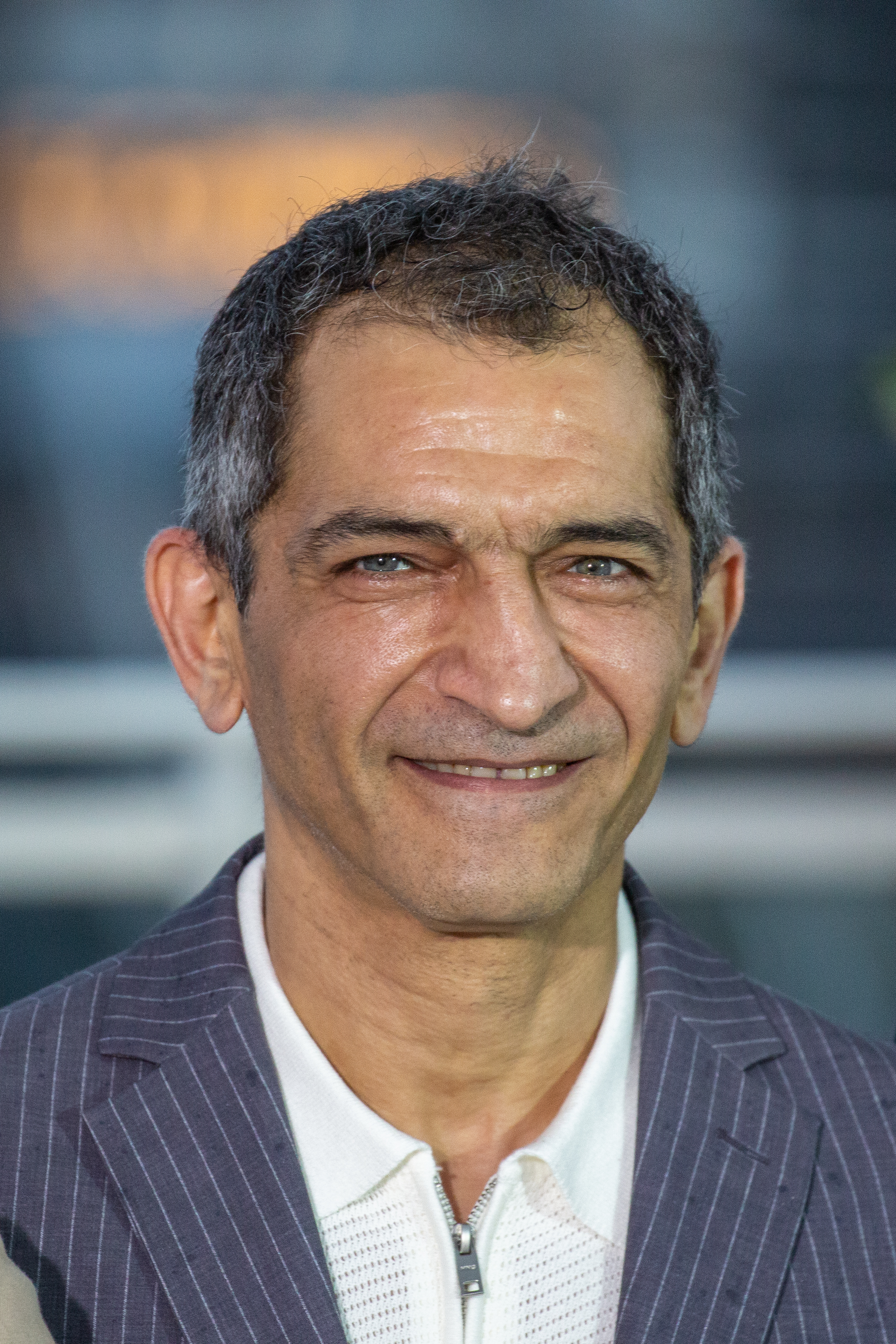
- Waked at the 2025 Cannes Film Festival
- Born: April 12, 1973 (age 53); Maadi, Egypt
- Education: American University in Cairo
- Occupation: Actor
- Years active: 1999–present
- Notable work: Syriana; Lucy; House of Saddam; Wonder Woman 1984; Ramy
- Spouse: Sarah Shaheen (m. 2015)

Amr Waked (Arabic: عمرو واكد Egyptian Arabic pronunciation: [ˈʕɑm.ɾe.wæːked]; (Note: pronounced separately Egyptian Arabic pronunciation: [ʕɑmɾ], Egyptian Arabic pronunciation: [ˈwæːked]) born April 12, 1973) is an Egyptian actor. He is best known to international audiences and in Hollywood for his role in the 2005 film Syriana. Other prominent roles include a Yemeni sheikh called Muhammad in Salmon Fishing in the Yemen, Pierre Del Rio in Luc Besson's Lucy and Farouk Hassan in Ramy.

In 2019, Waked was sentenced to eight years in prison by an Egyptian military court for spreading false news and insulting state institutions. For that reason, he has no intention of returning to Egypt. He has been residing in Spain since October 2017.

== Early life ==
Amr Waked was born on 12 April 1973 in Cairo, Egypt. He traces his roots to Kafr Saqr, in Sharqia Governorate in Egypt.

He studied economics and political science at the American University in Cairo, where he also participated in the university's theatre group. Before pursuing acting full-time, he worked as a stock trader while acting alongside his day job. He later left the financial sector to focus on acting.

== Career ==
Waked's first major role was in Ashab wallah business (2002) (Are we friends or just a business). Reviewers reported that he portrayed the role of "Gehad" so well that many viewers left the theater believing he was actually a Palestinian actor, rather than Egyptian. His first lead role was as Ahmed in Deil el Samaka (The Fish's Tail) (2003), and in 2005 he worked alongside George Clooney in the film Syriana, for which in 2006 he won a 'Special Award for Arabs in The International Cinema' at the Cairo International Film Festival. Waked joined the cast of the Egyptian television series Lahazat Harega (Critical Moments) in 2007, shooting 32 episodes for season one.

In 2008, Waked joined the cast of the BBC/HBO television series House of Saddam to portray Saddam Hussein's son-in-law Hussein Kamel. Since the lead role of Saddam Hussein was played by Israeli actor Yigal Naor, Waked faced punishment by Egypt's Actors Union which opposes normalization of ties with Israel. The union threatened to ban him from all future projects in Egypt. Waked was also criticized by supporters of the Palestinian cause for taking an acting role in Wonder Woman 1984 starring Israeli actress and former IDF soldier Gal Gadot.

In 2009, Waked co-hosted the 33rd Cairo International Film Festival, and in 2010 he rejoined the cast of Lahazat Harega. He joined Hollywood stars Matt Damon, Jude Law, Kate Winslet, and Gwyneth Paltrow in the 2011 film, Contagion and co-starred in the British film Salmon Fishing in the Yemen with Emily Blunt, Ewan McGregor, and Kristin Scott Thomas, and also co-starred in Lucy alongside Morgan Freeman and Scarlett Johansson. In 2017, he moved to Spain and was sentenced to eight years in prison by an Egyptian court for making pro-democracy comments on social media. Due to these charges, Waked is not able to return to Egypt.

Since 2019, Waked has played the father of main character Ramy Hassan on the Hulu series Ramy.

In 2021 Amr Waked hosted the web series Decoded (Dahaleez) in both Arabic and English. This was the first time he hosted for a news channel which also led him to being featured on The Muslim 500. Decoded won a Telly Award in 2022.

== Filmography ==
=== Films ===
Year	Title	Role	Notes
1999	Gannat al shayateen (The Paradise of the Fallen Angels)	Nona	
2001	Li li	Shiekh Abdel Al	
2001	Ashab wala business ? (Are we friends or is it just business?)	Gihad	
2003	Men nazret ain (At First Sight)	Akram	
2003	Dail el samakah (The Fish Tail)	Ahmed	
2003	Sahar el layaly (Staying up nights)	(Voice)	
2004	Ahla al awkat (Best Times)	Hisham	
2004	Khalty Faransa (My aunt France)	Yousif	
2004	Tito	Faris	
2004	Sib wana Aseeb (Lose and I'll lose)	Kariem	
2005	Kalam fel hob (Talking about love)	Hassan	
2005	Dam el ghazal (The Gazelle's Blood)	Atef	
2005	Syriana	Mohammed Sheik Agiza	
2008	Genenet al asmak (The Aquarium)	Yousif El nady	
2009	Ibrahim labyad (Ibrahim the white)	Ashry	
2009	The Traveller	Fu'ad	
2009	Al-Gondorji (The Shoemaker)	Saber	
2010	Il padre e lo straniero (The father and the stranger)	Walid	
2010	Alf Leila We Leila (One Thousand and One Nights)	Meg Windermere	
2011	Contagion	Rafik	
2012	Salmon Fishing in the Yemen	Sheikh Muhammed bin Zaidi bani Tihama	
2012	Winter of Discontent	Amr	
2014	El Ott; The cat		
2014	Lucy	Pierre Del Rio	
2014	Colt 45	Baron	
2014	The Blue Mauritius		
2017	Geostorm	Dussette	
2020	Wonder Woman 1984	Emir Said Bin Abydos	
2021	Super-héros malgré lui	Ivan Stona / Le Schizo	
2023	Firebrand	Dr. Mulay Al-Farabi	
2025	Urchin		
2025	Eagles of the Republic	Dr. Mansour	

=== Television ===
Year	Title	Role	Notes
2007–2010	Lahazat Harega (Critical Moments)	Dr. Ramy	
2008	House Of Saddam	Hussein Kamal	3 episodes
2008	The Shooting of Thomas Hurdell	Mohammad	
2010	Abwab El Khoof	Adam Yassin	
2010	El-Gamaah	Amr	
2010	Ostrich's Feather	Karem	30 episodes
2011	Odysseus	Eukaristos	2 episodes
2012	Spiral	Yannis	7 episodes
2014	Marco Polo	Yusuf	9 episodes
2017	El Herbaya	Mokhtar	
2017	Riviera	Delormes	10 episodes
2019–2022	Ramy	Farouk Hassan	28 episodes
2021	Decoded	Himself	Host
2024	The Listeners	Omar	BBC One mini-series

=== Theater ===
- 1992, Afareet Hamza We Fatma as Hamza
- 1992, Vinegar Tom as The Devil
- 1993, Crimes Of The Heart as Doc
- 1993, Al Ghaba Al Saeeda as The Fox
- 1994, Tales From Agabad as Hero
- 1994, Compass Berserk as Montigu
- 1994, The Bus as Ahmed
- 1995, Oedipus The President as Prometheus
- 2000, Al Ze'ab Yohaddid Al Madinah as The Journalist
- 2002, Shabab Rewish Tahn as Ahmed

== Recognition ==
=== Awards and nominations ===
- 1999, won Film Writers and Critics Special Award at Alexandria International Film Festival
- 1999, won Best Supporting Actor award at Alexandria International Film Festival for Gannat al shayateen
- 2003, won Best Actor award at Alexandria International Film Festival for Dail el samakah
- 2006, won Special Award for Arabs in The International Cinema at Cairo International Film Festival for Syriana
- 2006, won Horus Award for Best Supporting Actor at Cairo National Festival for Egyptian Cinema for Dam el ghazal
- 2010, won Best Supporting Actor at Dear Guest Festival for Ibrahim Labyad
- 2010, won Best Actor for Second Role at Cairo National Festival for Egyptian cinema for Ibrahim Labyad
- 2013, won Best Actor at Dubai Film Festival for the Egyptian movie Winter of Discontent

== See also ==
- Cinema of Egypt
- List of Egyptian films of the 2000s
