= The Deal (2012 film) =

- Poster for the film
- Arabic: المصلحة
- Original title: Al Maslaha
- Directed by: Sandra Nashaat
- Written by: Wael Abd-Allah
- Starring: Ahmed El Sakka; Ahmed Ezz
- Cinematography: Ehab Mohamed Ali
- Music by: Amr Ismail
- Release date: May 16, 2012
- Running time: 115 minutes
- Country: Egypt
- Language: Arabic

The Deal (Arabic: المصلحة, translit. Al Maslaha) is a 2012 Egyptian action film directed by Sandra Nashaat and written by Wael Abd-Allah. The film stars Ahmed El Sakka and Ahmed Ezz and is based on a true story.

The film was released on May 16, 2012.

== Plot ==
The film, inspired by a true story, revolves around Officer Hamza (Ahmed El Sakka), who requests to be transferred from the Central Security Forces to the Anti-Narcotics Department after his brother, Officer Yehia (Ahmed El Saadany), is killed by Suleiman El Moslimi (Mohamed Farrag). He hopes to arrest him and avenge his brother. Conflicts begin between chases and confrontations by the police and the agents of Salem El Moslimi (Ahmed Ezz), the biggest drug dealer in the Sinai Peninsula, and his brother Suleiman El Moslimi.

== Cast ==
- Ahmed El Sakka as Officer Hamza
- Ahmed Ezz as Salem El Moslimi
- Salah Abdallah
- Ahmed El Saadany as Officer Yehia
- Zeina as Shadia
- Kinda Allouch
- Hanan Tork as Hamza's wife
- Mohamed Farrag as Suleiman El Moslimi
- Mondher Rayahneh
- Mahmoud El Bezzawy as Awad Al-Badawi
