= Ibrahim Labyad =

2009 film by Marwan Hamed

- Directed by: Marwan Hamed
- Written by: Abbas Abo El Hassan
- Starring: Ahmed El-Sakka; Hend Sabry; Amr Waked; Mahmoud Abdel Aziz
- Music by: Hesham Nazih
- Release date: 27 May 2009
- Running time: 134 minutes
- Country: Egypt
- Language: Arabic

Ibrahim Labyad (Arabic: إبراهيم الأبيض) is a 2009 Egyptian action drama film directed by Marwan Hamed. Ibrahim (Ahmed El-Sakka) grows up in the harsh and unforgiving streets of Cairo, where crime and extreme violence, survival define everyday life. As a young boy, he witnessed the brutal murder of his father.

As he matures, Ibrahim becomes a fierce and skilled fighter, earning a reputation as one of the most ruthless enforcers in Zarzor's (Mahmoud Abdel Aziz) criminal empire. He stays alongside his close friend Ashry (Amr Waked), navigating the treacherous underworld of drug dealing, extortion, and brutal gang warfare.

Moreover, loyalty and betrayal run deep in the world of crime. When Ashry his closed friend was forced to turn against him, Ibrahim is left to fight alone against overwhelming & brutal aggressive fight, versus more than 5 people. As he finally confronts Zarzor, but leading to a tragic climax where revenge proves to be a hollow pursuit. In the end, Ibrahim's relentless path of vengeance leads only to destruction, as he dies in the arms of his beloved, realizing too late that his war was in vain and pointless.

== Cast ==
- Ahmed El-Sakka - Ibrahim
- Hend Sabry - Horeya
- Amr Waked - Ashry
- Mahmoud Abdel Aziz - Abdul-Malek Zarzur
- Bassem Samra - Mahdy
- Sawsan Badr - Horeya's Mother
