= Bashtery Ragel =

2017 Egyptian romantic comedy film

- Starring: Nelly Karim
- Release date: 2017
- Country: Egypt
- Language: Arabic

Bashtery Ragel (Arabic: بشتري راجل; "Buying a Man") is a 2017 Egyptian romantic comedy film, starring Nelly Karim.

Karim's character tries to conceive of a child through asking a man to do so via Facebook. Inas Lofty was the screenwriter.

== Plot ==
The main character, Shams, runs a business. She decides to ask a man to give her a sperm donation, and to make it halal she proposes a marriage, though it is only done for the purpose of the sperm donation. Her mother is concerned about the marriage's motive being only for a business reason, but Shams becomes genuinely attracted to him, and he does with his wife. Ultimately they instead have a traditionally conceived child. France 24 stated that this is "perhaps the only ending that could make the film a success with Egyptian audiences".

== Cast ==
- Nelly Karim: Shams Noureddine (شمس نور الدين)
- Muhammad Mamdouh - Baghat Abu Al-Saad (بهجت أبو السعد)
- Laila Ezz Al Arab: Nagwa Youssef (نجوى يوسف)

== Development ==
According to the screenwriter, the film was modeled after a friend who wanted to be a single mother as she wanted companionship but was uninterested in being married to a man, as she had not found good romantic relationships.

The film development team used a Facebook page purportedly of a woman asking for a sperm donation as a marketing ploy.

Lofty decided to use the romantic comedy genre to make the Egyptian public more amenable to the film's subject matter.

== See also ==
- List of Egyptian films of 2017
