= Mafia (2002 film) =

- Directed by: Sherif Arafa
- Starring: Ahmed El Sakka; Mostafa Shaban; Mona Zaki
- Release date: 23 July 2002
- Running time: 110 minutes
- Country: Egypt
- Language: Arabic

Mafia is a 2002 Egyptian action film directed by Sherif Arafa.

== Cast ==
- Ahmed El Sakka - Hussain / Tarek Zidan
- Mostafa Shaban - Hossam
- Mona Zaki - Mariam
- Ahmed Rizk - Rafat
