= Italia's War =

- Directed by: Ahmed Saleh
- Starring: Ahmed El Sakka; Nelly Karim
- Release date: 2005
- Running time: 110 minutes
- Country: Egypt
- Language: Arabic

Italia's War is a 2005 Egyptian action film directed by Ahmed Saleh and starring Ahmed El Sakka and Nelly Karim.

== Cast ==
- Ahmed El Sakka as Yassin
- Nelly Karim as Hana
- Kal-El Naga as Fouad
- Khaled Saleh
- Adel Hashim
- Cosimo Fusco as Franco
