= Ahmad Maher (director) =

Egyptian film director

- Occupation: Film director
- Notable work: Screened in the Special Presentations section at the 2009 Toronto International Film Festival; The art director on the 1990 Martin Scorsese film Goodfellas
- Father: Maher

Ahmad Maher (Arabic: أحمد ماهر) is an Egyptian film director. His directorial debut The Traveller (2009) competed for the Golden Lion at the 66th Venice International Film Festival. It was also screened in the Special Presentations section at the 2009 Toronto International Film Festival.
