= Mostafa Shaban =

Egyptian actor (born 1970)

Mostafa Shaban مصطفى شعبان
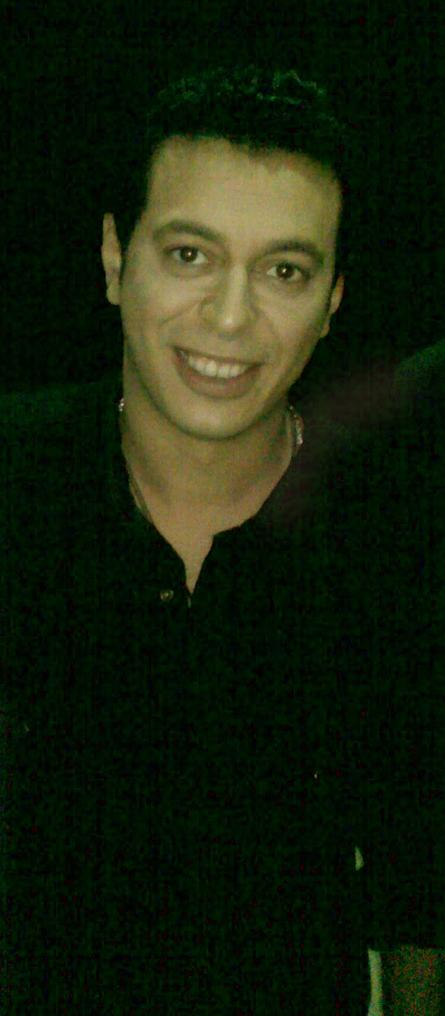
- Shaban in 2009
- Born: Mostafa Shaban; 19 May 1970 (age 56); Cairo, Egypt
- Occupation: Actor
- Website: https://www.facebook.com/MostafaShabanFan

Mostafa Shaban (Arabic: مصطفى شعبان; born 19 May 1970, in Cairo) is an Egyptian actor.

He is one of the current leading male actors in the Egyptian cinema.

== Filmography ==
=== Film ===
- Code 36 (Code 36) - 2007.
- juba
- Fatah Enek (Open Your Eyes) - 2006.
- Ahlam Omrena (Dreams of our lives) - 2005.
- Mafia - 2002.
- Khali el Demagh Sahee (Keep it Awake) - 2002.
- El Naáma wal Taous (The Ostrich & the Peacock) - 2002.
- Ailat Alhag Mitwali (Mitwali's Family) - 2002.
- Sekout Hansawar (Hshh- We're rolling) - 2001.

=== Series ===
- Abou Gabal ابو جبل
- Ayoob
- Allahom Eny Sayeeem
- Abu El Banat
- Mawlana El-aasheq
- Amrad Nesaa
- Mazag El Kheir
- Al Zoga Al Raba'a
- Al A'ar
- Nassim Errooh
- 3asfour
