= Tarek Alarian =

Palestinian-Egyptian film director

- Born: September 12, 1963 (age 62); Kuwait
- Occupation: Director
- Spouses: Hala Attal (before 1997) Angie Ali (m. 1998–2000) Assala Nasri (m. 2006–2020)

Tarek Alarian (Arabic: طارق العريان) (born September 12, 1963) is an Egyptian Palestinian film director. He is also credited as Tarek El'eryan and Tarek Eryan.

== Education ==
Alarian holds a Bachelor of Arts degree in both Communication and also Cinema and Photography from Southern Illinois University.

== Professional experience ==
- August 1986-May 1988: Executive Producer AAA (Film Production and Studios) Athens, Greece.
- 1987- Ongoing: Director, Producer, Screenwriter Freelance.
- July 1988-March 1993: Executive Producer Raid Alarian Film Production (Feature Film Production Distribution).
- March 1993-April 2005: Founder and CEO Online (Film, Music Video Production and Advertising Agency).
- June 1999 – 2001: Founder and CEO Framework (Feature Film Production).
- February 2003: Founder and CEO Fame Music (Music Label and Talent Management Company).
- August 2005-Ongoing: Founder and CEO Stargate (Music Label and Talent Management Company).
- November 2005-Ongoing: Partner and CEO CPH, Creative Production House(Music Videos, TV Commercials, TV Series, TV Programs, Feature Films production, and Equipment rental).

== Career ==
=== Film ===
- The Emperor (El Imbarator) 1989 (Director and producer).
- Le Pasha (El Basha) 1992 (Director, Producer, and Story).
- Snakes and Ladders (El Selim Wi El Taaban) 2001 (Director, Producer, Co-Screenwriter, and Story).
- Tito 2004 (Director, Producer, and Story).
- A Girl Left Behind (Director)
- Aswar EL Qmar (Director)
- New Life (Director, Screenwriter)
- Welad Rizk (Director, Producer)

=== TV commercials (director) ===
Directed around 350 TV commercials including:

- Coca-Cola Campaign.
- Sprite.
- Tourism Promotion (Egypt).
- Tourism Promotion (Dubai).
- Americana food Campaign.
- Channel Launch Campaign (Zoom).
- Hyundai Campaign.
- Pocari Drink Campaign.
- Dwarf Feta cheese
- Hlawany Jam
- Coca-Cola lyrics (Hisham Abbas)
- P&J Tomato paste
- Menatel (Hamada)
- Beverly Hills
- Goldy washing machine
- LG Fridge
- P&J juice
- Coca-Cola (Hisham Abbas) habetha
- Coca-Cola (Amer Mounib) concert
- Coca-Cola (Amer Mounib)
- Fine Kleenex
- Ciao Make up
- Good Morning soap
- Sprite
- Coca-Cola ne3eesh stadium
- Coca-Cola El Khateeb

=== Awards ===
Over 15 local and international awards including:

- Cairo film festival for the achievement of the year 1990 (The Emperor).
