= Mais Hamdan =

Jordanian actress

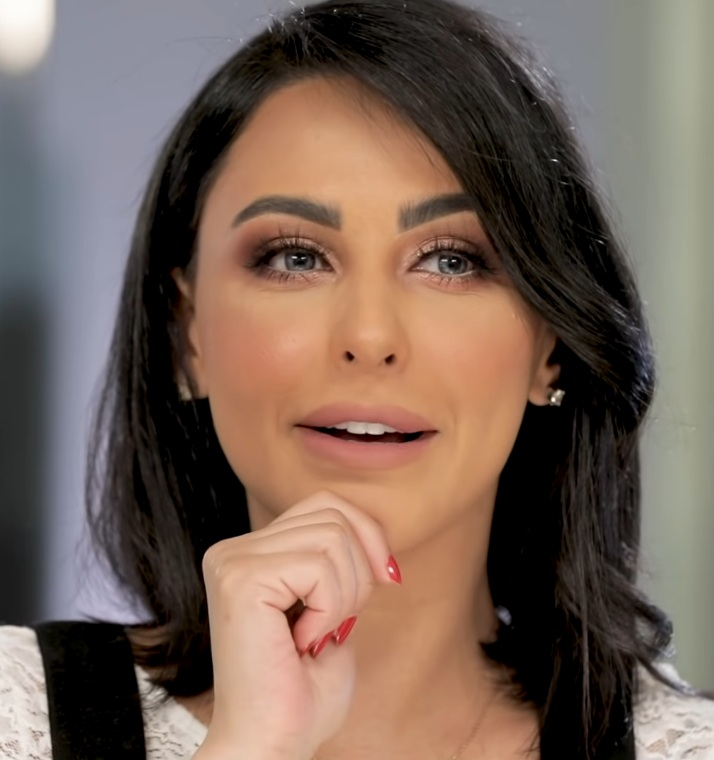
- Portrait of Mais Hamdan
- Born: Mais Abdel-Jabbar Hamdan Selim; October 31, 1982 (age 43); Abu Dhabi, United Arab Emirates
- Occupations: Singer; actress; television presenter
- Years active: 2003–present
- Relatives: Mai Selim, Dana Hamdan (sisters)

Mais Abdel-Jabbar Hamdan Selim (Arabic: ميس عبد الجبار حمدان سليم, born October 31, 1982), better known as Mais Hamdan (Arabic: ميس حمدان), is a Jordanian actress, singer and TV presenter. Her sisters are Mai Selim and Dana Hamdan.

== Early life ==
Mais Hamdan was born in Abu Dhabi, United Arab Emirates to a Jordanian father of Palestinian descent, and a Jordanian mother. She graduated from the Faculty of Commerce – English Section, Cairo University.

== Career ==
Hamdan started her career through the comedian TV show CBM which was aired on MBC, she was also the presenter of the TV show Meyya Mesa and Sister Soup with her sisters Mai and Dana.

In 2004, Hamdan started her TV career in Khareta Am Rakan and Sawalef Hareem, and Qerqee'aan in the next year. 2006 witnessed her film debut, she played the role of "Jameela" in the Egyptian film Zarf Taree (Emergency Case) alongside Ahmed Helmy and Nour, and the Saudi film Keif al-Hal?

In April 2020, her TV commercial for Cottonil was banned due to her mentioning of "underwear".

== Filmography ==
=== Films ===
Title	Year	Role	Notes
Samaka Wa Sennara	2017	Madline	
Share' 18 (Street 18)	2008	Raweyah	
Bahlam Ya Donia Begad	2008		Short Film
Omar & Salma	2007	Farah	
Zarf Tareq	2006	Jameelah	
Keif El-Haal	2006	Sahar	

=== TV ===
Title	Year	Role	Notes
Shea' Min Al-Madi	2018		
Noof	2018	Noof	
Taqet Nour	2017	Enjy	
Amir Al-Leil	2016	Nariman	
Quloob La Tatoob	2016	Noor	
Shatranj 3	2016	Karma	
Shatranj 2	2015	Karma	
Tareeqy	2015	Shahd	
Shatranj	2015	Karma	
Eshq An-Nesa'a	2014	Jihaan	
Al-Ekhwah (Brothers)	2014	Sarah	
Keeka Al Aaly	2014	Dina	
Hob Fe Al-Arba'een	2014		
Musalsaleeko	2013		
Le'bat Al-Mawt	2013	Noha	
Taraf Thaleth (Third Party)	2012	Ghaliah	
An-Naar Wa At-Teen	2012	Gawaher	
Feenak 2	2011		
Al-Aneedah	2011		
Sabaya 3	2011	Nancy	
Dimagh Hareem	2010		
Al-Masraweyyah 2: Fe Ar-Reef Wa Al-Banader	2009	Nooray	
Arabs in London	2008		
Qerqee'aan 3	2005		TV show
Sawalef Hareem	2004	Taheyya	
Kharetah Am Rakan	2004		
CBM	2003		TV show
