= Sherif Arafa =

Egyptian director, writer and producer

- Born: December 25, 1960 (age 65)
- Education: Cairo Higher Institute of Cinema
- Occupations: director, writer and producer
- Relatives: Amr Arafa (brother)

Sherif Arafa (Arabic: شريف عرفة) (born on December 25, 1960) is an Egyptian director, writer and producer. He graduated from the Higher Institute of Cinema in 1982.

Sharif Arafa participated in the making of many of the movies in the history of Egyptian cinema, such as; Terrorism and Kebab, Birds of Darkness, Al-La'ib Ma'a Al-Kibar, Mafia, Halim and Welad El Am and The Treasure. He produced several television works such as Tamer we shawkeya and "Lahazat Harega" "Critical moments".

He was famous for his political movies with the writer "Wahid Hamed"

== Awards ==
He received many awards during his career such as:

- Awards for best director and best film of the Egyptian Culture Minister Farouk Hosni to play movies with adults, Terrorism and Kebab and The forgotten
- Silver Award for best film festival in 1992 Milan African Film and film terrorism kebab
- Bronze Award for best film festival in Venice in 1995 for "dark birds
- Silver Award for best film festival in Milan in 1995 for "dark birds
- The prize for best out of the festival's national cinema in 2007 for the film Halim.

== Family ==
Both his father, Saad Arafa, and his younger brother, Amr Arafa, are directors.

== Selected filmography ==
- The 3rd Class
- Al-La'ib Ma'a Al-Kibar
- Terrorism and Kebab
- Birds of Darkness
- Idhak El Soura Tetla Helwa
- Aboud Alhudood
- El Nazer
- Ibn Ezz
- Mafia
- Halim
- The Island
- Welad El Am
- X-Large (film)
- The Treasure
- The Treasure 2
- El Ens w El Nems
- The Crime
