= Néjib Belkhodja =

Tunisian artist (1933–2007)

- نجيب بلخوجة
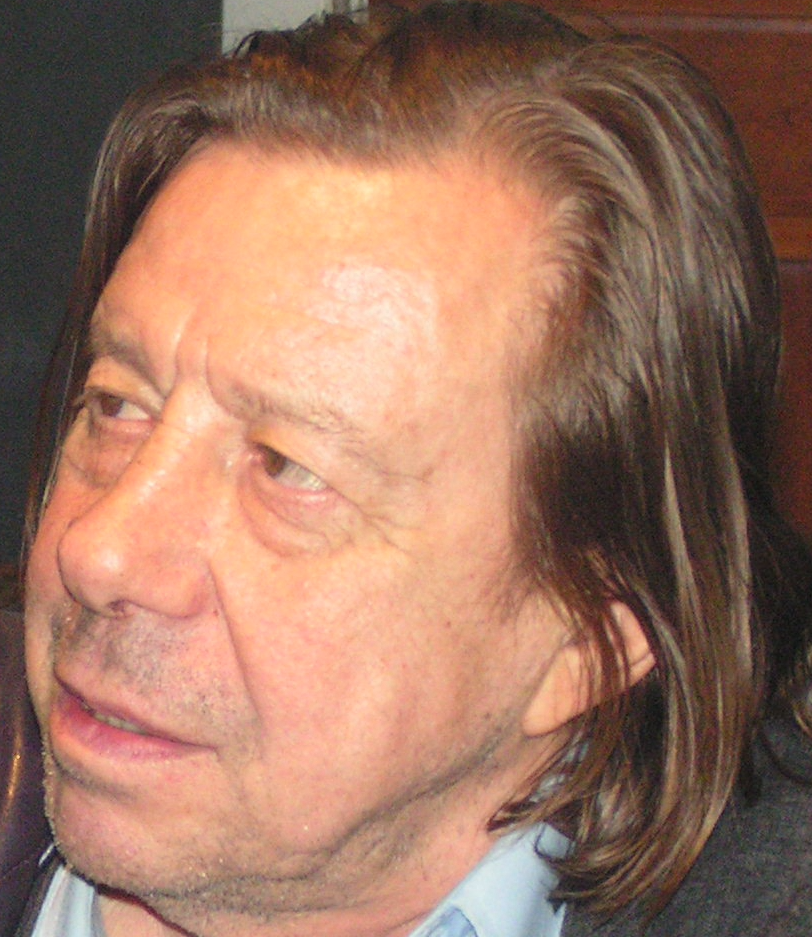
- Belkhodja in 2004
- Born: 1933; Tunis, French Tunisia
- Died: 8 May 2007 (aged 73–74)
- Occupation: Painter

Néjib Belkhodja (Arabic: نجيب بلخوجة; 1933 – 8 May 2007) was a Tunisian painter.

== Early life and education ==
Born 1933, in Tunis, Belkhodja's father was from the Tunisian bourgeoisie of Turkish origin. His mother was Dutch. He is the father of Slim Belkhodja French chessplayer Grandmaster born in 1962 in Tunis. Néjib went to the Tunis Institute of Fine Arts.

== Career ==
Belkhodja began exhibiting his artwork in 1956 with solo exhibits in Tunisia. In the same year, he received the Tunis City International Exhibition Award. He continued his career in France and Morocco and participated in many group exhibitions including in Tunisia, the United Kingdom, France, Egypt, West Germany and the United States. He won a gold medal in Italy in 1964 and in Egypt in 1968. Also in 1968, he won the National Award for painting from the Cité internationale des arts in Paris. In 1991, he held an exhibition in Tunis with the Iraqi painter Dia Azzawi. He was one of the founders of the Groupe des Six, an avant-garde group of artists.

Belkhodja had a particular approach to the traditional architecture of the medina, and his works and paintings have the mark of the specificity and authenticity of modern Tunisian art. He used Arabic calligraphy in his abstract paintings, and shapes from Islamic architecture.

Among his works were the designs for several Tunisian stamps.
