= Destiny (1997 film) =

1997 film

- French theatrical release poster
- Directed by: Youssef Chahine
- Written by: Youssef Chahine; Khaled Youssef
- Produced by: Humbert Balsan; Gabriel Khoury
- Starring: Nour El-Sherif
- Cinematography: Mohsen Nasr
- Edited by: Rashida Abdel Salam
- Release date: 9 May 1997
- Running time: 135 minutes
- Countries: Egypt; France
- Languages: Egyptian Arabic; French; Spanish

Destiny (Arabic: المصير, translit. al-Maṣīr; French: Le Destin) is a 1997 Egyptian-French historical drama film directed and co-written by Youssef Chahine. It was screened out of competition at the 1997 Cannes Film Festival. The film was selected as the Egyptian entry for the Best Foreign Language Film at the 70th Academy Awards, but was not accepted as a nominee.

The film is about Averroes, a 12th-century philosopher from Andalusia who would be known as the most important commentator on Aristotle.

The film is set in Córdoba and depicts the relationship between the Caliph and Averroes, who is one of his most trusted advisors. Religious fanatics start gaining control and begin influencing the Caliph's decisions, leading to the persecution of the philosopher, and to political unrest in Andalusia.

== Cast ==
- Nour El-Sherif as Averroes
- Laila Eloui as Manuella
- Mahmoud Hemida as Al-Mansur, The Caliph
- Safia El Emari as Averroes' Wife
- Mohamed Mounir as Marwan
- Khaled El Nabawy as Al-Nasir, The Crown Prince
- Hani Salama as Abdullah The Caliph's Brother
- Abdalla Mahmoud as Borhan
- Ahmed Fouad Selim as Cheikh Riad
- Hani Salama as Abdalla
- Magdi Idris as Emir of the Sect
- Ahmed Moukhtar as Bard
- Sherifa Maher as Manuella's Mother
- Fayek Azzab as Al-Razi
- Hassan El Adl as Gaafar
- Faris Endris Rahoma as Youssef
- Ingi Abaza as Sarah

== See also ==
- List of historical drama films
- List of submissions to the 70th Academy Awards for Best Foreign Language Film
- List of Egyptian submissions for the Academy Award for Best Foreign Language Film
