= Hanan Tork =

Egyptian actress and ballerina

- حنان ترك
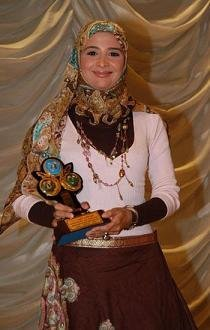
- Born: Hanan Hasan Abdelkrim Tork; March 7, 1975 (age 51); Cairo, Egypt
- Education: Cairo Ballet Institute
- Occupation: Actress
- Years active: 1991–2013
- Spouse: Mahmud Malek (m. 2012)
- Children: 2

Hanan Hasan Abdelkrim Tork (Arabic: حنان حسن عبد الكريم ترك; born 7 March 1975) is a retired Egyptian actress and ballerina. In addition to her artistic endeavors, Hanan is a global spokesperson for the international charity.

== Biography ==
Hanan Tork has two brothers, and her father owned a factory for clothes (El Torky for female dresses). She started her career as a ballerina and completed her studies at the Cairo Ballet Institute in 1993. She then became a member of the Cairo Ballet Group and soon after moved to the Classical Ballet Group.

She began her acting career when the famous director Khairy Beshara saw her and offered her the chance to act alongside Nadia Al-Gindi in the 1991 movie Raghbah Motawaheshah. After that the young ballerina was thirsty for more and got her next role in television series El Awda El Akheera having the chance to act alongside Salah Zulfikar in one of his final acting roles. Her next role was in Be'r Sabe with the director Nur Eldemerdash. Among her TV roles were parts in El Sabr F El Mallahat, El Mal W El Banun and Lan A'ish Fi Gelbab Abi. In 1993, she was offered another role on the silver screen: Dehk We Le’b We Gadd W Hobb. Her big chance came when she was chosen by the famous director Youssef Chahine to play a part in El Mohager in 1994.

In 1997, she acted alongside the singer Mohamed Fouad in Ismailia Rayeh Gai. In the same year, she also had the opportunity to work with Chahin once again by starring in his movie Al Masir. Then in 1999, she had leading roles in Al Akhar and Fata Men Israel. Then yet another cooperation between the young star and the famous director in the box office hit Al Assefa. In 2000, the now famous actress appeared in the Ramadan serial Opera Aida. She then saw more success in the following year, with a role alongside the famous actress Samira Ahmed in "Amira Men Abdeen". She also played the leading female role in the comedy movie Ga'na Al Bayan Al Taly, opposite Mohamed Henedi. In 2001, Hanan played a role in the comedy movie Gawaz Be Karar Gomhourey. Then came her large hits Haramiyya Fi KG2 in 2002 and Haramiyyah fi Tayland in 2003. In 2007, she was nominated for Best Performance by an Actress at the Asia Pacific Screen Awards of Kas w lask film.

In 2005, the film "Dunia" by Lebanese director Jocelyne Saab was released, in which Hanan played the leading role. The movie centers around the title character Dunia, a belly dancer and poet. When the film aired at the 2005 Cairo International Film Festival, it left the audience split between those who supported the film’s call for intellectual freedom and its stance against female circumcision, and those who disapproved of the title character's desire to physically express herself through dance. It was also controversial that so many scenes were filmed in Cairo's slums, which could be seen to tarnish Egypt's international image. The film was especially controversial in Egypt for taking up the tradition of female circumcision, among other reasons; it received a good deal of attention in Europe.

In 2006, Hanan chose to begin wearing the religious headscarf, and has been very vocal about this decision. By doing so, Hanan Tork has joined a group of actresses who also made the decision, such as Hala Shiha and Abla Kamel. Despite wearing a religious headscarf, she has continued acting. In August 2012, she decided to stop acting and focus on her family, albeit with different roles. She was married previously to businessman Khaled Khatab, they divorced in 2007. Hanan Tork has stated that one of the main factors that led to her divorce was her husband's displeasure at her choosing to wear religious headscarf and was not happy with her "change in behavior" after she became religious. In 2012, she got remarried to Mahmud Malek, the brother of Muslim Brotherhood activist leader Hasan Malek. It was reported that despite her retirement, due to her past background of being an entertainer, Malek's family were against their marriage. Hanan Tork has three children from her first marriage and two from her second. Her husband owns a men's fashion boutique in Cairo.

== Retirement ==
Hanan Tork quit acting during the Ramadan season 2012. Since then, she only participates in Egyptian cartoon movies and series via her voice.

== Filmography ==
=== Film ===
Movie	Translation	Year	Role / Movie's Poster
Nas Tegannen	People Causing Madness	1980	
Fi El Eshq W El Safar	In Love And Travel	1991	
Raghbah Motawaheshah	Savage Desire	1992	Wafa
Dehk W Le'b W Gadd W Hobb	Laugh, Play, Work And Love	1993	Maha
El Mohager	The Immigrant	1994	Hati
Sareq El Farah	Thief Of Joy	1994	Rommanah
Ismailia Rayeh jayy	Ismailia To And Fro	1997	Salwa
Emraah W Khamsat Regal	A Woman And Five Men	1997	Nashwa
Fatah Men Israel	A Girl From Israel	1999	Aminah
El Akher	The Other	1999	Hanan
El Asefah	The Storm	2000	Hayah
Gawaz Be Qarar Gomhuri	Marriage By Presidential Decision	2001	Riham
Haramiyya Fi KG 2	Thieves In KG 2	2001	Rim
Etfarrag Ya Salam	Watch Wow	2001	Halah
El Hobb El Awwal	The First Love	2001	Wafa
Sekut Ha Nsawwar	Silence We Will Shoot	2001	Hanan
Ga'ana El Byan El Tali	We Got The Following Statement	2002	Eeffat Elsherbini
Shabab Ala El Hawa	Youth On Air	2002	Nadia
Mohami Khole	Divorce Lawyer	2002	Safinaz
Dil El Samakah	Tail Of Fish	2003	Nur
Haramiyyah Fi Thailand	Thieves In Thailand	2003	Hanan
Sahar El Layali	Sleepless Nights	2003	Farah
Hobb El Banat	Girls' Love	2004	Ghadah
Ahla El Awqat	The Best Times	2004	Salma
Tito	Tito	2004	Nur
Donya	Donya. It is named (Kiss Me Not In The Eyes ) abroad.	2005	Donya
Kalam Fi El Hobb	Words In Love	2006	Salma
El Hayah Montaha El Lazzah	Life Is Extremely Delicious	2006	Hanan
El Aba El Seghar	The Young Fathers	2006	Amal
vElaqat Khasah	Private Relations	2006	
Ass W Lazq	Cut And Paste	2007	Gamilah
Ahlam Haqiqiyyah	Real Dreams	2007	Maryam
El Maslahah	The Deal	2012	Hanan

=== Television ===
Series	Translation	Year	Role
El Awda El Akheera	The Final Return	1993	
El Mal W El Banun	Money And Boys	1993–1995	Thorayya
El Sabr Fi El Mallahat	Patience In Salines	1995	Nura
Elzini Barakat	Elzini Barakat	1995	Samah
Nesf Rabi3 Elakhar	Half Of The Other Rabi	1996	Omaymah
Lan A3ish Fi Gelbab Abi	I will Not Live In Gown Of My Father	1996	Nazirah
Samhuni Ma Kansh Asdi	Forgive Me I didn't Mean It	2000	Wardah
El Watad	The Wedge	2000	Basmah
Opera Aydah	Opera Aydah	2000	Aydah
Sarah	Sarah	2005	Sarah
Awlad El shaware3	Children Of Streats	2006	Zinab
Hanem Bent Basha	Lady Daughter Of Lord	2009	Hanem
El Ottah El Amiyah	The Blind Cat	2010	Fatmah
Nunah El Mazunah	Nunah Employee Of Marriage	2011	Nunah
El Okht Trez	Sister Trez	2012	Khadigah/Trez
