= Dorra Zarrouk =

Tunisian actress (born 1980)

- درة زروق
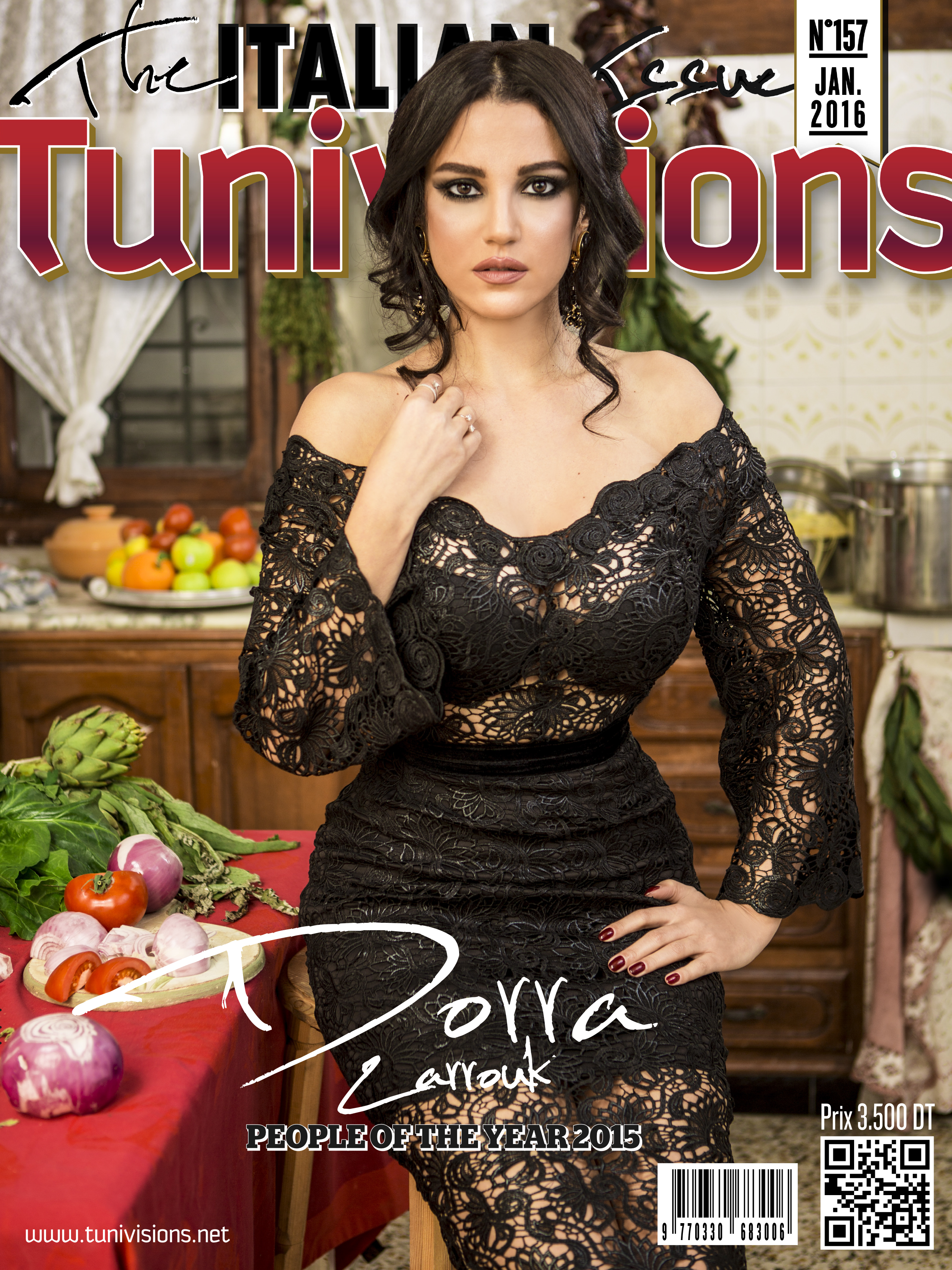
- Zarrouk on the January 2016 cover of Tunivisions
- Born: Dorra Ibrahim Zarrouk; 13 January 1980 (age 46); Tunis, Tunisia
- Education: St Joseph's University
- Occupation: Actress
- Years active: 2002–Present
- Known for: Egyptian cinema • Egyptian television
- Spouse: Hany Saad (m. 2020)

Dorra Ibrahim Zarrouk (Arabic: درة إبراهيم زروق; born 13 January 1980) is a Tunisian actress living in Egypt.

== Early life ==
Dorra was born in Tunis, her father was Ibrahim Zarrouk and her maternal grandfather, Ali Zouaoui, was an economist and politician.

Dorra had a Bachelor of Law at the Faculty of Law and Political Science of Tunis in 2001, then she had a Master of Advanced Studies in Political Science from the Saint Joseph University in Lebanon in 2003.

== Career ==
Despite her academic background, Dorra started performing in 1997, then acting on the Tunisian theater, El Teatro, with Taoufik Jebali in 2000. In 2002, Dorra's first act was at a Franco-Tunisian film, Khorma.

In 2003, she took part in the Colosseum: Rome's Arena of Death. Her first TV series outside Tunisia was in 2004, when she acted in Fares Bani Marwan in Syria. In the same year, she starred in Nadia et Sarra with Hiam Abbass. In 2005, she acted in Le Voyage de Louisa.

In 2007, she started her career in Egypt, where she featured at Alawela fel Gharam and Heya Fawda with Menna Shalabi.

Later on, she acted in various films such as Al Mosafer, Papa, Tisbah Ala Khair and Sheikh Jackson.

In 2008, she starred in the Tunisian series Maktoub, directed by Sami Fehri and written by Tahar Fazaa, alongside Dhafer El Abidine and Mohamed Ali Ben Jemaa.

She was a member of the jury at the Alexandria Mediterranean Film Festival from September 10 to 16, 2014.

In June 2024, she was chosen as head of juries for the Miss Elite beauty pageant.

== Personal life ==
Dorra was briefly engaged to a Tunisian businessman Qays Mukhtar in 2012. In April 2020, she posted pictures on social media dating an Egyptian businessman and interior designer, Hany Saad, whom she married in November 2020.

== Accolades ==
=== Awards and nominations ===
Name of the award ceremony, year presented, category, nominee(s) of the award, and the result of the nomination
Award ceremony	Year	Category	Recipient	Result	Ref.
Academy of Sciences and Technology of Alexandria	2012	Best Arab Actress	Dorra Zarrouk	Won	
Arab Satellite Festival	2020	Excellence Award	Haramlek	Won	
Arab Satellite Festival	2023	Excellence and Creativity Award	Al Aghar	Won	
Beirut Golden Awards	2018	Achievement Award	Dorra Zarrouk	Won	
Dear Guest Festival Awards	2008	Best Rising Actress	Dorra Zarrouk	Won	
Dear Guest Festival Awards	2010	Special DGF committee Award	El Aar	Won	
Dear Guest Festival Awards	2014	Special DGF committee Award	Segn El Nessa	Won	
Dear Guest Festival Awards	2014	Best Actress	Segn El Nessa	Nominated	
Dear Guest Festival Awards	2021	Best Actress	Between Heaven And Earth	Won	
Dear Guest Festival Awards	2023	Excellence Award	The Accused	Won	
Distinctive International Arab Festivals Awards	2018	Best Actress	Dorra Zarrouk	Won	
Dream TV	2007	Newcomer of the Year in Egyptian Cinema	Dorra Zarrouk	Won	
Forbes Middle East	2022	Career Achievement Award	Dorra Zarrouk	Won	
Tunisian International Human Rights Festival	2022	Honorary Award	Dorra Zarrouk	Won	
Master International Film Festival	2023	Honorary Award	Dorra Zarrouk	Won	
Murex d'Or	2012	Best Arab Actress	El Rayan and Adam	Won	
Murex d'Or	2018	Best Arab Actress	Al Rayan and Adam	Nominated	
Murex d'Or	2019	Best Arab Actress	Nesr Said	Nominated	
Nejm El Arab Festival	2019	Best Actress	Bila Dalil	Won	
Nile Television Network	2014	Best Actress	Segn El Nessa and Sadeq El Omr	Won	
Oscars of Arab Television Channels (ART)	2007	Best Rising Actress	Dorra Zarrouk	Won	
Port Said International Film Festival	2025	Honorary Award	The Life That Remains	Won	
Washwasha Awards	2022	Best Actress	El-Kahen	Won	
What Happens Magazine	2018	Best Arab Actress	Dorra Zarrouk	Won	

=== State honors ===
Country	Year	Honor	Ref.
Tunisia	2019	Order of Cultural Merit of Tunisia	

=== Listicles ===
Publisher	Year	List	Position	Ref.
Forbes Middle East	2017	The Top 10 Arab Female Actors	5th	
