= Mai Selim =

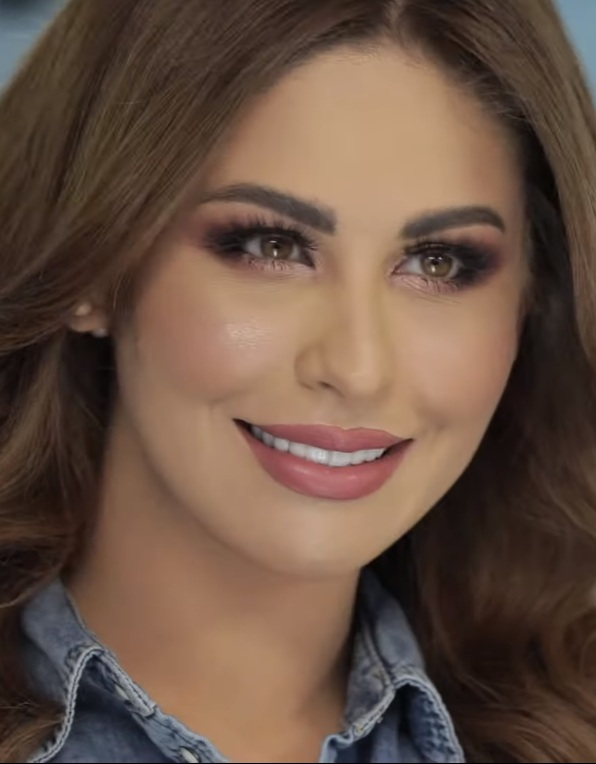
- Born: Mai Abdel-Jabbar Hamdan Selim; November 6, 1983 (age 42); Abu Dhabi, United Arab Emirates
- Occupations: Singer; Actress
- Years active: 1997–present
- Spouse: Ali al-Refai (m. 2010; div. 2012)
- Children: 1
- Musical career
- Genre: Arabic pop
- Instrument: vocals
- Label: Alam El Phan

Mai Abdel-Jabbar Hamdan Selim (Arabic: مي عبد الجبار حمدان سليم, born November 6, 1983, in Abu Dhabi), commonly known as Mai Selim (Arabic: مي سليم), is a Jordanian singer and actress. Her sisters are Mais Hamdan and Dana Hamdan.

== Biography ==
=== Musical debut ===
Mai sings in the Egyptian dialect, though she was born to a Palestinian Jordanian father and a Lebanese mother. She has been living in Egypt ever since she was young and has stated she almost lived her whole life there. She gained a degree in Business Studies from Maritime Academy in Egypt.

Mai states that luck has played a big part in her getting to where she is right now:

"I won't lie and give you the clichéd line of 'I've been working towards this all my life since I was a child' and all that stuff. I knew I had a very strong artistic side to me, and I had a strong passion towards music, but I never thought I'd make a career out of it one day."

In 2008, she released the album Ehlawet El Ayam (Arabic: احلوت الأيام).

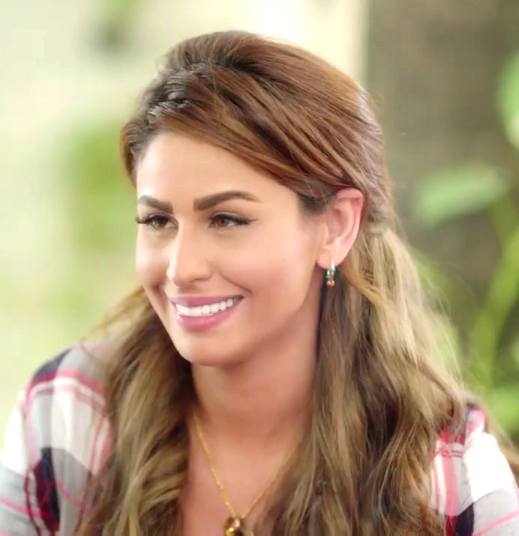
Mai Selim (Ramadan 2015)

== Personal life ==
She married Egyptian businessman Ali al-Refai from November 2010 to 2012, with whom she had her daughter, Lili.
