= Ahmed Ezz (actor) =

Egyptian actor

- أحمد عز
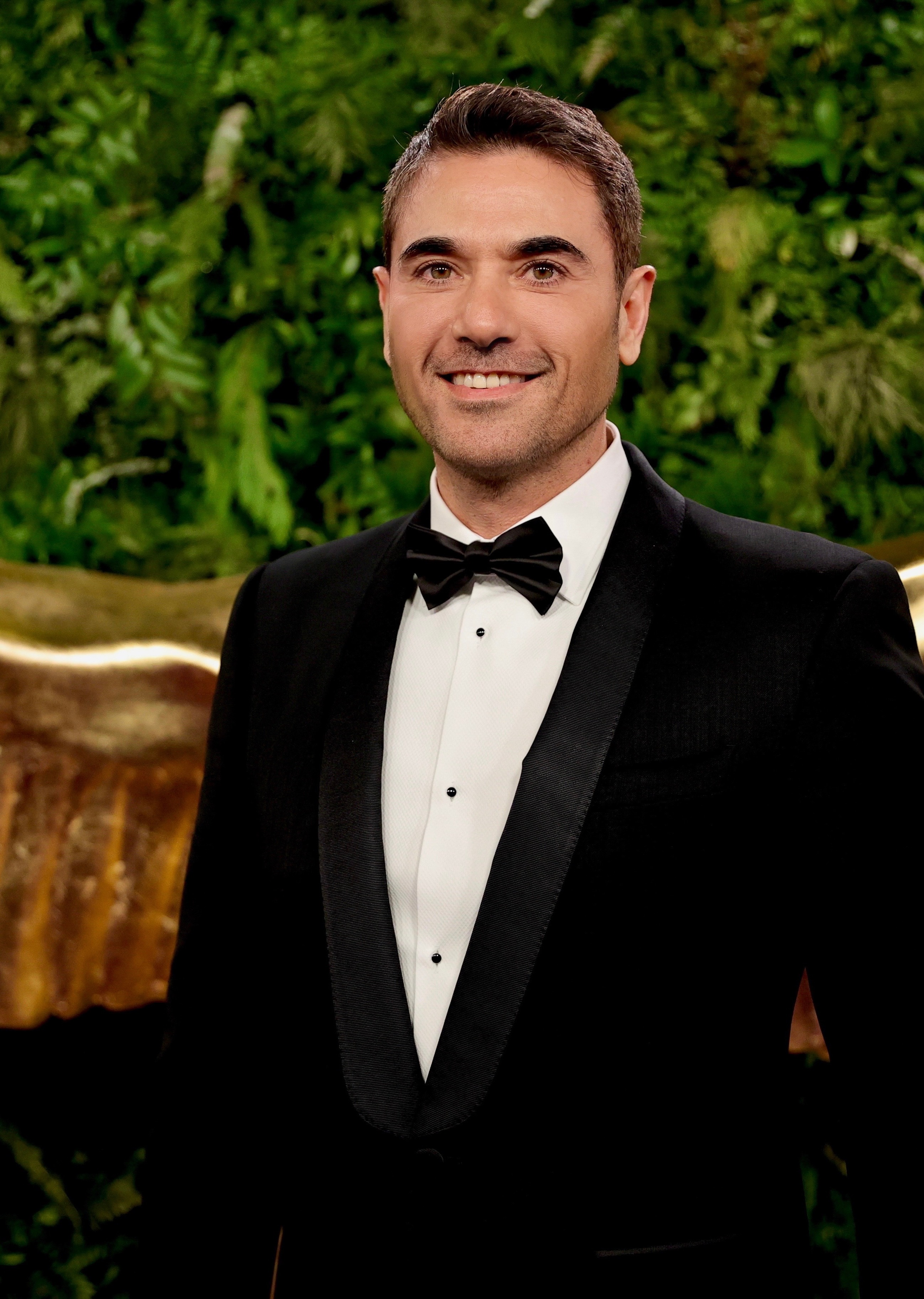
- Ezz in 2023
- Born: Ahmed Ezz Eldine Ali Ezzat; 23 July 1971 (age 55); Maadi, Cairo Governorate, Egypt
- Education: Ain Shams University
- Occupation: Actor
- Years active: 1995–present
- Height: 1.88 m (6 ft 2 in)
- Spouse: Angham (m. 2011–2012)

Ahmed Ezz Eldine Ali Ezzat (Arabic: أحمد عز الدين علي عزت; born July 23, 1971), is an Egyptian actor, with numerous accolades in his professional career spanning over 20 years and over 30 film and television credits to his name. His popularity stems from his versatility as an actor in comedy, drama, thriller and action films and television. In 2022, he starred in the epic action drama "Kira & El Gin" which became the highest-grossing film in the history of the Egyptian cinema.

== Acting career overview ==
At the beginning of his career, Ezz was quickly recognized as the young Arabic actor to watch, winning "Best Young Star of the Year" Award for his performance in Malak Rohi in 2003. He also received the Best Supporting Actor award at the Cairo International Film Festival in 2004 for his performance in "Girl's Love." In 2007, Ezz's breakthrough performances in "Al Rahena (The Hostage)" and "The Ghost" where he won Lebanon's prestigious 2007 Murex d'Or Award for Best Arabic Cinema Actor and 2007 'Dear Guest' Best Actor of the YearAward, respectively, lauded him as Arab's premiere actors. His most recent hits include the "Sons of Rizk" blockbuster franchise (2015-2019), the undercover thriller "The Cell" (2018) in which Ezz' performance garnered him the Arabian Cinema Award for Best Actor, the war movie "The Passage" (2019), the cyber thriller "The Knower" (2021), the film noir The Crime (2022) in which film critic Omar Bakry of El-Shai Magazine commended Ezz' complex performance stating he was: "Reborn into a sophisticated actor & has made it loud and clear why he’s become one of the top actors in the region" and "Kira & El Gin" (2022) in which the film's unprecedented box office success in North America and the Arab World increased Ezz visibility worldwide.

In 2022, Netflix decided to explore Love Stories across the Arab world with the critical acclaimed anthology series "Love, Life & Everything In Between" in which Ezz starred in the first story 'O, Brother' directed by Sandra Bassal.

In 2026 he was starred in movie 7 Dogs alongside Karim Abdel Aziz. The film was a success and in Egypt it earned EGP 131.4 million from 912,300 tickets sold during its first week. The figure was reported as a new Egyptian box-office record.

== Stage acting ==
Ezz starred in the popular production of "Aladdin" and its prequel follow-up "Haddy Valentine” which debuted as a special live event series for Saudi Arabia in 2023.

== Personal life ==
As a child, Ezz was an avid swimmer and played competitive table tennis in Cairo. He always took an interest in acting since starring in a school play at age 8. Ezz majored in English at the Faculty of Arts later exploring his passion for the craft as a student at the prestigious Actors Studio. Ezz supported his early acting career as a professional model appearing in large brand campaigns and working in the tourism industry before his career launch in Enas El-Degheidy's "Night Talk" in 2002 opposite glamour icon Youssra. Ezz was briefly married to Egyptian singer Angham before the marriage was annulled in 2012.

== Filmography ==
=== Films ===
- 1997: A Fish & 4 Sharks: One scene
- 1998: Night's Talk : Two Scenes
- 2002: Mozakarat Moraheqa
- 2003: Girl's Love
- 2004: Yom Al Karama
- 2004: Sana Oula Nasb
- 2004: Shabab Take Away
- 2005: Malaki Iskendiriya
- 2005: Al Bahithat An Al Horriya
- 2006: Al Rahina (The Hostage)
- 2007: The Ghost
- 2008: Transit Prisoner
- 2009: Badal Faqed
- 2010: Ethalatha Yeshtaghalunha
- 2011: 365 Days of Happiness
- 2011: Midnight Party
- 2012: The Deal
- 2012: Helm Aziz
- 2013: Al Hafla
- 2013: Hatuly Ragel
- 2015: Sons of Rizk
- 2017: The Cell
- 2019: El Mamar (US Title: The Passage)
- 2019: Sons of Rizk 2
- 2021: The Knower
- 2022: The Crime
- 2022: Kira & El Gin
- 2024: Sons of Rizk 3
- 2026: 7 Dogs

=== Television ===
- 2007-1998: Zezinia - Guest of Honor
- 2003: Malak Rohi
- 2009: The Clinic - Guest of Honor
- 2009: Al Adham
- 2014 : The Excellence
- 2018: Abo Omar Masry
- 2021: Counterattack
- 2022: The Choice - Season 3
- 2022: Love, Life and Everything in Between (Netflix Anthology)

=== Animated Cartoon ===
- 2013: Amir and the Journey of Legends

=== Radio ===
- 2005: Film Arabi
- 2007: Eid Fe Real Madrid
- 2008: Sindbad Emad
- 2009: Kolkasa Fe Wekalet NASA
- 2011: Mesbah Alaa El Din Zaazu
- 2014: Malek El Hawa
- 2015: Gharam Ala Instagram
- 2016: Tora Bora
- 2017: Diezle
- 2020: Please ya englez

=== Advertising ===
- 2007: Pepsi- Ramadan Sehour
- 2010: Etisalat
- 2011: Ford
- 2011: Chevrolet Cruze
- 2011: Captin Shrimpo Kentucky
- 2012: KFC's
- 2013: Universal's
- 2017: Mountain View
- 2018: Indigo We Egypt
- 2023: Etisalat
- 2023: Zed

=== Plays ===
- 2000: Yassine & Bahia
- 2020: Aladdin
- 2022: Haddy Valentine
- 2024: Malak and The Smart One

== Awards ==
Year	Nominated work	Category	Result
2003	Malak Rohi	Shaam Countries Festival "Syria & Lebanon" Award for Best Arabian Young Star of The Year	Won
2004	Girl's Love	Best Supporting Actor Award from 10th Cairo National Festival for Egyptian Cinema	Won
2007	The Hostage	Murex d'Or Award for Best Arabian Cinema Actor	Won
2007	The Ghost	Dear Guest Award for Best Actor of The Year	Won
2009	Al-Adham	ART Award for Best Young Actor	Won
2009	Al-Adham	Dear Guest Award for Best Young Actor	Won
2015	Sons of Rizk	Dear Guest Award for Best Cinema Actor	Won
2018	The Cell	Arab cinema Oscar for Best Actor	Won
2023	Kira & El Gin	The Joy Award for Favorite Actor	Won
