= Nelly Karim =

Egyptian actress, model, and ballerina (born 1974)

- Nelly Karim in 2025
- Born: Nelly Mohamed El-Sayed Atallah; 18 December 1974 (age 51); Alexandria, Egypt
- Occupations: Ballet dancer, Actress
- Years active: 1995–present
- Spouse(s): Hani Abuelnaga (m. 2004; div. 2015) Hisham Mohd Ashour (m. 2021; div. 2024)
- Children: 4

Nelly Karim (Arabic: نيللي كريم; born 18 December 1974) is an Egyptian actress, former ballet dancer, and model known for her versatility and grounded, naturalistic acting style in both film and television. She began her artistic career at a young age as a ballet dancer with the Cairo Opera House and later transitioned into acting and modeling in the early 2000s. She gained major recognition in Egyptian cinema with standout roles in socially driven films and tv series, where she portrayes complex female experiences in contemporary Egyptian society, helping establish her as one of the most respected actresses of her generation.

== Early life ==
Nelly Karim is the daughter of a Soviet Russian mother from Leningrad and an Egyptian father from Zagazig. Born in Alexandria, Egypt on 18 December 1974, she lived much of her early life in Russia while spending summer vacations in Alexandria. Her family moved back permanently to Egypt in 1991 when her father died and she was 16.

== Career ==
=== The 1990s/2000s ===
Karim's first career was as a ballet dancer. She started dancing as young child in the former Soviet Union, where she joined her first professional dance school and performed at the Odessa Opera House. Upon her return to Egypt in 1991, she secured a spot at the Academy of Arts in the Cairo Ballet Institute and the Cairo Opera Ballet Company. In less than a year, she won the Cairo Ballet Competition. She was performing at the Cairo Opera in 2000 as the prima ballerina when she was given an opportunity to appear on Fawazeer Ramadan, a popular Egyptian radio and television show that included dance routines.

That same year Karim got her first acting role when Faten Hamama, one of Egypt's most famous actresses, saw Karim on Fawazeer Ramadan and picked her to play her daughter in the TV series, Wageh El Amar (Face of the Moon). The 2000 series received wide attention because of Hamama's return to the screen after a seven-year hiatus, and won the Best Series award in the Egyptian Radio and Television Festival in 2001. In 2002 Karim landed her first film role in Youth on Air (Shabab Ala El Hawa) starring alongside Hanan Turk, another Egyptian ballerina turned actress. Similar to Turk, Karim got her first big break in a film directed by Youssef Chahine, among Egypt's most celebrated filmmakers. She appeared in the role of Rita Hayworth in his 2004 film Alexandria... New York, a fictional retelling of his life. It was screened in the Un Certain Regard section at the 2004 Cannes Film Festival.

In 2004 Karim played the role of a ballerina in Khaled Youssef's You're My Life (Enta Omry), and won the Best Actress award at the Cairo International Film Festival. That same year, she starred alongside singer-actor Moustafa Amar inYour Love's Fire (Hobak Nar), a musical drama inspired by Romeo & Juliet.

The 2009 film One-Zero (Wahed Sefr) marked Karim's first collaboration with the director Kamla Abou Zekri and writer Mariam Naoum, and who she considers among her most favorite collaborators. While a modest commercial success, it was critically well received domestically and internationally. With Cairo as the backdrop on the eve of an important soccer match, the story follows the lives of eight characters over the course of a single day, including Karim's Riham, a young religious nurse. One-Zero was notable for having an-all female crew of director, screenwriter, director of photography, and editor. The film won several awards including Best Director for Zekri and a Special Award for Karim at the 2010 Cairo National Festival for Egyptian Cinema.

Karim described this period as one where she was "getting into acting gradually" but still dancing professionally; she stopped ballet in earnest around 2012 to focus entirely on acting.

=== The 2010s ===
In 2010 Karim starred in Cairo 678, Mohamed Diab’s first feature film, and their first project together. The film follows the intersecting stories of three Egyptian women of different social classes who take action against their sexual harassers. The film, which also starred Bushra and Nahed El Sebai, prompted a national dialogue about sexual harassment. It was a domestic box office success and became one of Egypt's most successful movies abroad, having been shown in over 60 countries. Karim won the Best Actress award for her role at the Arab Film Festival in 2011.

A Girl Named Zaat’ (2013) is one of Karim's most popular series and her second collaboration with the director-writing team of Kamla Abou Zekry and Mariam Naoum. An updated adaption of the 1992 novel Zaat: The Tale of One Woman's Life in Egypt During the Last Fifty Years by Sonallah Ibrahim, the film follows the life of a lower-middle-class woman (Zaat, played by Karim) from 1952 through the 2011 Egyptian uprising chronicling her challenges over the course of Egypt's political and social changes. The series was both a ratings and critical success, though courted controversy with the Muslim Brotherhood during filming given the 1970s-era clothing that was viewed as indecent. She teamed up again with Zekry and Naoum in 2014's Women’s Prison (Segn el Nesaa), another hit series, and an adaption of a play by Fathia al-Assal. In a 2019 interview, Karim noted that filming the series was emotionally challenging, and that killing one of the characters (el Nesaa) was the most difficult scene of her career to that date. Similar to One-Zero, the series was notable for having an all-female crew.

In 2015 Karim appeared in Under Control (Taht el Saytra) a Ramadan series that received wide attention for addressing the issue of drug addiction, a topic rarely shown on Egyptian screens. Directed by Tamer Mohsen and scripted by Mariam Naoum, the series centered around Karim's character, a struggling drug addict who relapses after nine years of recovery. In Free Fall (Soqot Horr) (2016), Karim tackles the issue of mental illness in the role of a mentally unstable woman accused of murdering her husband and sister. She spent two months in a mental asylum preparing for the role.

In 2016 Karim again teamed with Mohamed Diab in Clash (Eshtebak) a polarizing film in Egypt when it was released. The story takes place following the 2013 removal from office of then-President Mohammed Morsi of the Muslim Brotherhood. Told entirely within the confines of a police truck filled with a mix of detained protestors, the tensions among them reflected the real-life conflicts between Muslim Brotherhood and pro-army supporters. The film was widely acclaimed at the 2016 Cannes Film Festival where it premiered and was Egypt's submission in the Best Foreign Language Film category of the 89th Academy Awards. In September of that year, Karim served as jury member for the Horizons section at the 73rd edition of the Venice Film Festival.

By 2019, Karim had acted in and 17 Egyptian film and 9 television series.

=== The 2020s ===
In 2020 She played a lead role alongside Asser Yassin in the tv series Meet Wesh (100 faces). The tv series achieved huge success.

The comedy series Rose and Layla was released in January 2024, pairing Karim with Yousra in their first project together as a pair of hapless detectives.

In March 2025, Karim starred in the Ramadan series My Sisters (Ekhwaty). Directed by Mohamed Shaker Khodeir, and written by Mohab Tarek, the 15-episode murder mystery series reunites Karim with Ruby, her Women’s Prison co-star, alongside Gehan El-Shamashergy and Kinda Alloush. She also co-starred in the 2025 coming-of-age drama Happy Birthday, Egypt's entry for Best International Feature Film at the 98th Academy Awards. Later that year, she appeared in Stories, an Egyptian family drama starring Amir El-Masry and helmed by Abu Bakr Shawky. The film premiered at the Tallinn Black Nights Film Festival and went on to win the Golden Tanit for Best Film at the Carthage Film Festival in December. Stories is set to appear in cinemas in June 2026 across the Arab market.

In the summer of 2025, she filmed the romantic comedy, Wedding Party (Brovet Farah), Amira Diab's feature directorial debut. The film is set for a summer 2026 release.

== Personal life ==
Married young and a first-time mother at age 18, Karim has two sons from her first marriage. She married her second husband, Hani Abuelnaga, in 2004 with whom she has two daughters, Celia and Talia. The couple divorced in 2015. In August 2021, she married squash player Hisham Mohd Ashour. Their marriage ended in divorce in 2024. She has an older brother, Ashraf, a doctor who migrated to the United States.

== Filmography ==
=== Film ===
- (2001) Shabab Ala El Hawa ( Youth on Air )(as Sahar)
- (2002) Horob Momya (Runaway Mummy) (as Dalia)
- (2004) Eskendreyya Nyu York (Alexandria... New York ) (as Carmen / Rita Haweri)
- (2004) Hobbak Nar (Your Love Is Fire) (as Salma as Juliet)
- (2004) Ghabi menno fih (Stupid From Him In Him) ( as Samia)
- (2004) Enta Omri (You're My Life) (as Shams)
- (2005) Italia's War as Hana
- (2006) Fattah Enek (Open Your Eyes) (as Yasmin )
- (2006) Hatta Nehayet El Alam (To End Of The World) (as Salma)
- (2007) Ahlam El Fata El Tayesh (Rash Boy Dreams) ( as herself)
- (2008) Ehna Et'abelna Abl Kedah? (Have We Met Before?) (as Sarah)
- (2009) Wahed -Sefr (One-Zero) (as Riham)
- (2010) ( 678 ) ( as Seba)
- (2010) Alzheimer (“Alzheimer's) (as Mona the nurse)
- (2010) El Ragel El Ghamed Be Salamtoh (Mysterious Man By His Wow) (as Lamis)
- (2014) El Fil El Azrq (The Blue Elephant)
- (2016) Eshtebak ( Clash )
- (2017) Bashteri Ragel (I Buy A man) ( as Shams)
- (2019) El Fil El Azra' 2 (The Blue Elephant 2)
- (2020) Khat Dam (Blood Line) (as Lamia)
- (2021) El Thalathah 12 (Tuesday 12) (as Mariam)
- (2021) 30 Youm (30 Days)
- (2025) Happy Birthday (as Laila)
- (2025) El Sett (as Nazli Sabri)

=== Television ===
- (2000) Wagh El Amar (Face of the Moon )
- (2001) Hadith El Sabah W El Masa ( Speech Of Morning And Evening)
- (2005) El amil 1001 (Agent 1001)
- (2009) Hedu nesbi (Relative Quietness)
- (2013) Zat (Zat)(as Zat)
- (2014) Segn El Nesa (Women’s Prison)
- (2014) Saraya Abdin (Abdin Palace)
- (2015) Taht El Saytarah (Under Control)
- (2016) Soqot Horr (Free Fall)
- (2017) Le A'la Se'r (For Highest Price)
- (2018) Ekhtefa (Disappearance)
- (2020) Be Mit Wesh/Multifaceted (2020)
- (2021) Ded El Kasr (Against Breakup)
- (2022) El Gisser (The Bridge)
- (2022) Faten Amal Harby (Faten Amal Harby)

== Awards ==
- Best Actress at the Cairo International Film Festival (2004, won for Enta omry, (Your are my Life) tied with Eszter Bagaméri)
- Special Award at the Cairo National Festival for Egyptian Cinema (2010, won for Wahed-Sefr) (One Zero)
- Jury Grand Prize at the Asia Pacific Screen Awards (2011, group award with Nahed El Sebaï and Bushra for 678)
- Best Actress at the Arab Film Festival (2012, for 678)
- Honorary award at the 37th Cairo International Film Festival (2015)
- Golden Tanit Award, the Carthage Film Festival (2021)
