= Khaled El Nabawy =

Egyptian actor (born 1966)

- خالد محمد النبوي
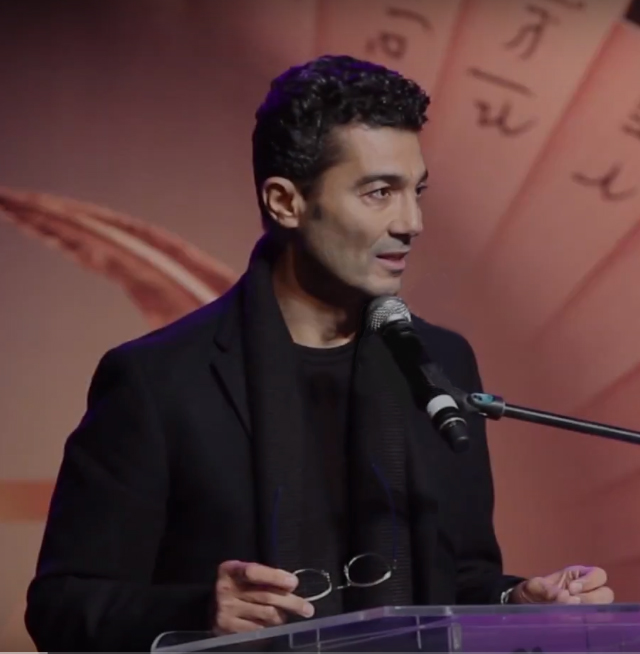
- Born: September 12, 1966 (age 59); Mansoura, United Arab Republic
- Citizenship: Egypt
- Education: Higher Institute For Agricultural Co-Operation
- Alma mater: Higher Institute for Dramatic Arts
- Occupation: Actor
- Years active: 1990–Present
- Awards: Abu Dhabi Film Festival (2014)

Khaled Mohamed El Nabawy (Arabic: خالد محمد النبوي; born September 12, 1966) is an Egyptian actor who played roles in film, theater and television.

He was born in Mansoura, Egypt, and was introduced to cinema by the director Youssef Chahine in 1994, in his film Al Mohager. El Nabawy was awarded the All African Film Award for best actor for his role in this film, and also won the Horus Award for best supporting actor for Al Maseer, from Cairo National Festival for Egyptian Cinema. El Nabawy attended the Institute of Performing Arts. He lives in Cairo, Egypt. His roles in Hollywood include Mullah, the first advisor to Saladin, portrayed by Ghassan Massoud in the blockbuster film Kingdom of Heaven. He also played the role of Hamed, an Iraqi scientist in the film Fair Game.

El Nabawy was a high profile supporter of the 2011 Egyptian revolution both in the media and also, at times, personally protesting the streets.

== Filmography ==
Year	Movie	Role
1990	Leila Assal	Ahmed
1994	The Emigrant	Ram
1997	Destiny	Al Nasir
1997	Ismailia Rayeh Gai	Abdulaziz"Zizo"
2000	Omar 2000	Omar
2005	Kingdom of Heaven	Mullah
2010	The Dealer	Ali El Halwany
2010	Fair Game	Hamed
2012	The Citizen	Ibrahim
2020	Youm Wa Layla	
2022	Laylet Qamar 14	
2024	Ahel Al Kahef	

== Television ==
Year	Production	Role
1990	Sharea Al Mawardi(Season 1)	cameo
1992	Bawabat Al Halawani(Season 1)	Hamza al-Halawani
1992	Alwaad Al Haq	a Muslim from Habasha
1994	Bawabat Al Halawani(Season 2)	Hamza al-Halawani
1996	Rabaa Ta'oud	cameo
1998	Nahno La Nazra' Al Shouk	Hamdy
2000	Ragol Tamooh	Salah Mortada
2001	Bawabat Al Halawani(Season 3)	Hamza al-Halawani
2001	Hadeeth Al Sabah Wal Masa'	Dawood "Pacha" El Masry
2003	Mas'alet Mabda'	Adel
2005	Rage'lek Ya Eskenderia	Akram
2008	Café Cino	Khaled
2009	Sadaq Wa'dah	Tayem
2012	Ebn Mout	Gabir Al-Khawaga
2014	Ebtedy	Himself(as Khaled El Nabawy)
2015	Maryam	Nadeem Fakhry
2016	Suits	The new Mike
2017	wahet el-ghoroub	Mahmoud Abd el-Zahir
2019	Kingdoms of Fire	Tuman bay II
2020	When We Were Young	Yassin

== Theatre ==
Year	Play	Role
2014–2016	Camp David	Anwar Sadat
