= Ghosts of Sayala =

Egyptian television series

Ghosts of Sayala (Arabic: عفاريت السيالة, translit. Afaryt el-Sayala) is a 2004 Egyptian TV series directed by Ismail Abd al-Hafez and written by drama writer Osama Anwar Okasha, the last one he wrote before he died. The show stars 23-year old Ahmed El-Fishawy, Abla Kamel, Hassan Hosny, Zeina, Mahmoud El-Hadini, Safia El Emari and others. It was aired for 37 episodes in one season produced and aired by EMPC.

== Production ==
The opening song was performed by Hani Al-Abd.

In a 2018 interview, Ahmed El-Fishawy stated that his role in the show still his favorite role of his acting career.

The show had some problems during production and also with advertisers, which led to exclude it from the Ramadan season.

== Synopsis ==
The story follows numerous simple people from the same poor and rural region of Sayala which is located in Bahary, Alexandria. Contrastingly, there is a completely different classy element; an old billionaire and his family based in Cairo. The old man learns that he has a son from a third wife from Sayala, which made him feel utterly ashamed of himself. As result, he decides to write his will giving his newly known son the big share of his money and assets, an action that made his family so distressed, as they don't even know they have another sibling from another wife, moreover, he comes from a much lower social class. And then, the events get more complicated when it's time to execute the will.

After getting the money, Maghaouri's life changes slowly into a luxurious style, also his family. On the other hand, Qesmat Hanem and her family couldn't bear the unexpected distribution of money and assets, and the suspicious appearance of Maghaouri, so they start battles legally and through other ways.

The first scene of the series is somehow an overall conception of the events and also the moral philosophy of the story, the scene set in a local cafe in Sayala, and then starts the monologue-wise conversation between an old man (A'am Asaliya) and a falsely claimed reporter, the old man spoke frankly and modestly about his long stay in the urban area, his views on the people and how poverty sometimes might create cooperative little communities and more strong beliefs and ethics, though, the evil always come from many ways. There are many scenes in almost every episode in the show which we can find portraits of these thoughts or even through a blunt dramatic dialogue.

== Characters ==
=== Maghaouri's family ===
- Maghaouri: Early 20s boy from a rural neighborhood in Bahary, Alexandria, his life revolves around his people and close friends, Maghaouri was the gang leader of a small group who call themselves the Ghosts of Sayala. Although, the acts of the gang was shown as harmful only for people who do evil acts. Maghaouri didn't finish his high school education and occasionally works in some illegal deals like smuggling. He lives within quite poor living standards, but he believes he has the gift of people who love him, which are feelings he misses because he didn't meet either of his parents.
- Rezqa: Many aspects of Rizqa's unambiguous personality reveal in the first few episodes, as an independent widow who brought up her nephew Maghaouri, depending on working at her small stall, also most of the times she is totally conservative and frank, in many scenes we see that her bluntness gets people insulted or confused, however, there are other scenes show the tenderness of her character, as she still devoted to her dead husband even after several years, and also the love for Maghaouri.
- Azima: Sister of Rezqa, she is attached most to her family and her life totally revolves around them, she doesn't play critical role when the events go on and she agrees with Rezqa most of the time.
- Qadara or Edara: Daughter of Azima. She was engaged to Hamada Salim but their relationship went into some conflicts, and she saw that his family still oversee his life decisions. Edara is a cheerful young woman, and when the dramatic change happened, she was the most adaptive person to get along with the new high-class life.
- El Sala: El-salah 'ala el-nabi Fath el-bab, Mahouri's nephew and close friend to him as they brought up together. El Sala is an early 30s normal guy who still can't find a regular job or gets married. He is kind of naive and fond of eating. When Maghaouri becomes a billionaire, they live together in the new villa.

=== El Hamouli's family ===
- Saleh Al-Hamouli: A billionaire businessman who owns companies in several industries inside and outside Egypt. El Hamouli starts the conflict of the plot when he decides to write his will, giving Maghouri and Shaheera the lion’s share of his fortune. After this unexpected action, he disappears and goes on a vacation in Europe in an isolated area near a Mediterranean beach. He is shown in many episodes talking to an old Franco-Leabanese friend about his speculative thoughts on his long life, career, and family. He has married three times.
- Qesmat Hanem: Wife of Saleh El Hamouli, a high class lady. She appears to be grim in many situations, some are serious as she goes with conflicts with Maghaouri’s. Qesmat Hanem has a powerful and respected personality. After the consequences of the fortune distribution occur, Qesmat believes that she was forced to enter a battle against the fraudulent allegations made by Maghaouri, and his lawyer, Saleh. She appeared in many scenes that tend to be dramatic and monologic.
- Talaat: The Oldest son of EL Hamouli, he enters into different troubles through the series, as he was the most provoked member of the family after their father's distribution of fortune. Talaat believes that either his father went mad or the so-called Maghaouri is just a crook. He also goes into trouble with his wife. He occasionally appears to be fractious.
- Shaheera: The daughter of Saleh El Hamouli from another wife, she lives with them much time but not all involved in their life. She enters into conflicts with them and leaves to stay in hotels in Alexandria nearby Maghaouri and with her friend. She is recently divorced and her husband shows up in a scene trying to attack her while Maghaouri was present. Shaheera's personality and thoughts tend to be more reasonable and progressive, also she shows huge love for her half-brother Maghaouri. Through the events, there is some chemistry of love between her and lawyer Mokhtar.
- Mousheera: The youngest daughter of Saleh El Hamouli, a spoiled 19-year-old girl with no worries until she finds out that her to-become fiancée is cheating on her and does many unbearable things, and through the events, she feels more stressed and somehow feeling love for her half-brother Maghaouri.
- Ezzat: Husband of Baheera, a kind of sharp businessman who is always ready to suggest ending solutions using unethical ways. He appointed a trusted small businessman who hired Al Tuliani to be his man in El Sayala after the consequences occur. Ezzat is strong in his decisions and has good relationships with his wife and her family.
- Magdy: Son of Saleh.
- Baheera: Daughter of Saleh.

=== People of Sayala ===
- Asliya El Fakry: One of Sayala's old residents, he lost his son. His nickname "El Fakry" means the "unfortunate".
- Mamdouh El-tuliani: He represents the evil character. Tuliani has been working in Libya for years to abate the sentence. After he comes back to Sayala, he starts to think of new ways to get money, illegally.
- Ghareeb Al-qas: His uncle, Hanafi, is a respected old man in timber trade, but Ghareeb is infamous for his unethical lifestyle, especially when he befriends Tuliani’s gang. He is married to former local belly dancer Safaa.
- Hamada Salim: Edara's fiancée for a period of time. His family has relatively better living standards compared to most neighbors.
- Raaesa: Working widow and old friend and neighbor of Rezqa’s. She has two kids, her brother Youssef just comes back to Sayala after several years of work in Libya.

=== Other characters ===
- Dr. Mounes: Top lawyer and old friend of El Hamouli, he stands with his last wishes in life and executes his will, which included being aside of Maghaouri and aiding him with all things related to his new position as owner of many companies. Mounes backed Maghaouri in the legal cases issued by his other family, he appointed one of his best lawyers in Alexandria to direct Maghaouri. Dr. Mounes is a 50s years old man but he fell in love with Shaheera. His son is also a lawyer working on the case.
- Mokhtar Abd El-sattar: Lawyer based in Alexandria working on behalf of Dr. Mounes, he gets into the life of Maghaouri deeply and provides him advice in nearly all situations, which leads to a strong relationship between the two, in conjunction with the romantic love between Maghouari and Mokhtar’s youngest sister, more events make him enters more in the consequences.
- Abd El-Halim Barakat: Counselor and top lawyer based in Cairo, gets the case of Qesmat Hanem and her sons, he is renowned for being successful in complicated cases for large corporate and high-profile figures.

== Cast ==
- Abla Kamel: Rezqa
- Ahmed El-Fishawy: Maghaouri
- Safia El Emari: Qesmat Hanem
- Mahmoud El-Hadini: Abd El-Halim Barakat
- Farah (Fedra): Shaheera
- Khairiah Ahmed: Azima
- Ahmed Said Abdel Ghany: Talaat
- Ashraf Zaki: Essam El-ouqr
- Mohamed Kamel: Mamdouh El-tuliani
- Shady Ali: El-salah 'ala al-naby
- Ghareb Mahmoud: Attia
- Soliman Eid: Sayed Animia
- Hassan Hosny: Saleh Al-hamouli
- Nashwa Mustafa: Raaesa
- Zeina: Qadara
- Diaa El Merghany: Ghareeb Al-qas
- Randa El Behery: Moushira
- Ahmed Sadek: Yousef
- Bahaa Tharwat: Hamada Salem
- Osama Abbas: Counselor Moens Abbas

== See also ==
- List of Egyptian television series
