= 1947 Egyptian cholera epidemic =

1947 Egyptian epidemic of cholera

In late 1947 an epidemic of cholera swept Egypt, killing thousands of people. The first death occurred on September 21 1947 in the town of al-Qurayn. Despite government quarantine efforts, the disease spread through Lower Egypt, exacerbated due to lack of access to clean drinking water in rural villages. The Egyptian government as well as organized citizens and the international community led a major effort to fight the disease, successfully ending the epidemic by the end of 1947. In the end, around 20,804 cases were reported with over 10,277 deaths, though the actual numbers are thought to be higher, up to 35,000 cases with 20,000 deaths. The last case was declared on New Years Eve 1947, though it was officially declared over on 11 February 1948, King Farouk's birthday.

== History ==
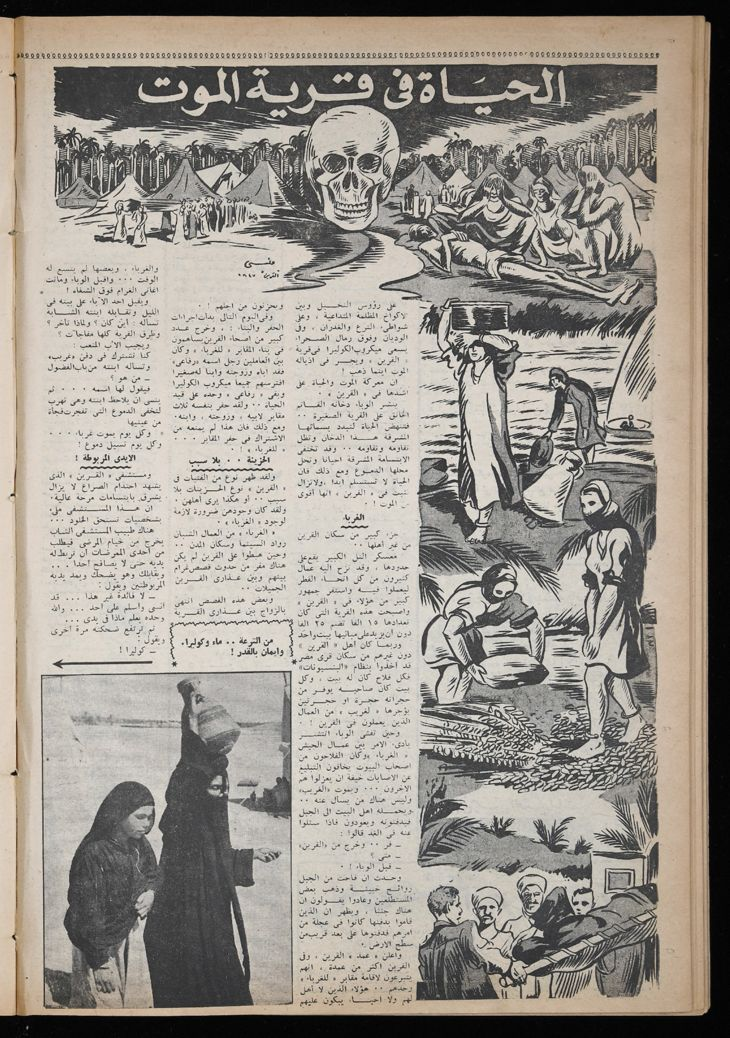
Article in Ākhir sāʼah about the 1947 Egyptian cholera epidemic

The first death occurred on September 21 1947, when a man from al-Qurayn fell ill with severe vomiting and diarrhea, and died within hours. The director of the local hospital, Sami Labib, suspected food poisoning, sending samples from the man to Cairo for testing. He continued to diagnose the issue as food poisoning until 4 am the following day, when Labib himself developed the same symptoms. Four hours later, he telephoned the health inspector at Faqus asking for a team to be sent to the village. He later died that day. After arriving at the village, the inspector concluded that it was cholera and contacted the Contagious Disease Inspector at 2:30 pm on the 22nd. Other potential cases of cholera were reported as early as the 16th.

On the 24th, the minister of health Nagib Iskandar called press conference after visiting al-Qurayn with his team. He announced thirty-six new cases and urged the public to remain calm. The army was called to prevent people from leaving the town, though people were able to smuggle out. The main issue was the lack of sanitation, since many fellahin drank water from the same canals that were used to disposing of waste and bathing. Another one of the government's tactics was to put infected people in isolation camps. Yet these camps were incredibly unpopular, as Egyptians tried to conceal their symptoms to prevent getting sent to the camp.

Prime minister Nuqrashi raised £E 500,000 for relief efforts. Millions of vaccines were either donated or sold at below market value to Egypt; by late October Egyptian labs were able to produce all the vaccines required. Local political organizations also mobilized to stop the epidemic. The Muslim Brotherhood organized forty thousand of its member to distribute pamphlets from the ministry of health and to care for patients. Trucks with loudspeakers instructed people about health regulations. Young Egypt also organized to fight against cholera. Its leader, Ahmed Hussein, called its members to "make himself a soldier against cholera". Ibrahim Shukri, the vice president of the party, personally injected local fellahin the vaccine and had the sick isolated in his local village; there were no further deaths after his efforts. The Wafd Party, now out of power, formed their own committee to study the disease and published a report on the government's shortcomings. On the last week of October, one thousand Wafdists volunteered in the Wafd stronghold of al-Munira, which was badly struck with cholera. The socialists of the DMNL (Arabic acronym: HADITU), also created student associations to fight cholera in the slums of Cairo, distributing soap, phenol, and lysol as well as reporting and quarantining cases. The Muslim Brotherhood sent thugs with clubs to attack the socialists, and the police began breaking up DMNL groups.

The international community also played a crucial role in assisting Egypt. The US, though the Navy Medical Research Command based in Cairo, was able to secure 10,000 pounds of vaccines and other supplies within 24 hours. NAMRU also sent teams to vaccinate schools; it is estimated that they inoculated 1,000 people a day in a month, which one local paper called “one of the most spectacular examples of medical cooperation in history.” The British government donated 1.4 million doses and British companies sold 1.8 million doses of the vaccine to the Egyptian government. Other countries that donated though the WHO include the USSR, Switzerland, Tunisia, France, the Netherlands, Brazil, Iraq, Italy and China.

One of the major controversies of the epidemic was its origin. On 8 September 1947, cholera had broken out in Punjab. In an article for Akhbar el-Yom, Muhammad Hasanayn Haykal wrote that cholera was spread to Egypt from a local British base near al-Qurayn. This started a major political scandal in Egypt, as Egyptian nationalists blamed the British for the epidemic. However, the source of the epidemic was never proven, Nonetheless, the epidemic became a useful tool in advocating for complete Egyptian independence.

== In Media ==
- Andrée Chedid's novel The Sixth Day tells the story of a poor family during the epidemic. This was adapted into a film in 1986 directed by Youssef Chahine and starring Dalida, Shwikar, Hamdy Ahmed, Salah El-Saadany, and Mohamed Mounir.
- Struggle of the Heroes (1962) directed by Tewfik Saleh tells the story of a village during this epidemic
- Nazik al-Malaika wrote a poem, 'The Cholera', about the epidemic

== Sources ==
- Boyer, J. (1947). "The cholera epidemic of Egypt". Paris Medical (in French). 37 (50): 589. ISSN 0369-8300. PMID 18909770.
- Gallagher, Nancy Elizabeth (1990). Egypt's Other Wars: Epidemics and the Politics of Public Health. Syracuse University Press. ISBN 9780815655527.
- Gohar, M. A.; Makkawi, M. (1947). "Some observations on the cholera vibrio isolated from the 1947 Egyptian epidemic". The Journal of the Egyptian Medical Association. 30 (11): 525–529. ISSN 0013-2411. PMID 18914660.
- Ibrahim, Nada Maurics (November 2020). Contagion and Crisis: Narrating Egypt's 1947 Epidemic in Literature and Film (Thesis). American University in Cairo.
- Khalil, M. (1948a). "The effect of the absolute humidity of the atmosphere and the general vaccination on the 2nd wave of the cholera epidemic in Egypt 1947-1948". Bulletin de l’institut d’Égypte. 31 (1). Persée - Portail des revues scientifiques en SHS: 1–37. doi:10.3406/bie.1948.3888.
- Khalil, M. (1948). "The cholera epidemic in Egypt in 1947". The Journal of the Egyptian Medical Association. 31 (1): 15–21. ISSN 0013-2411. PMID 18864352.
- Kozma, Liat; Samuels, Diane (February 2019). "Beyond borders: the Egyptian 1947 epidemic as a regional and international crisis". British Journal of Middle Eastern Studies. 46 (1): 50–67. doi:10.1080/13530194.2017.1370999. JSTOR 48541282 – via JSTOR.
- Osman, Faihan Ibrahim (April 2025). Cholera, Crisis, and Collapse: The Role of Egypt's 1947 Cholera Epidemic in Political Disillusionment in the Liberal Experiment (Thesis). The University of Texas at Austin. doi:10.26153/tsw/60658 (inactive 8 September 2025).
- Rainsford, S. G. (1952). "The cholera epidemic in Egypt 1947; some aspects of the research work of the U.S. Naval Medical Research Unit No. 3". Journal of the Royal Naval Medical Service. 38 (4): 178–191. ISSN 0035-9033. PMID 13011761.
- Shousha, Aly Tawfix (1948). "Cholera Epidemic in Egypt (1947)". Bulletin of the World Health Organization. 1 (2): 353–381. PMC 2553924. PMID 20603928.
- Smallman-Raynor, Matthew; Cliff, Andrew D. (October 2016). "The diffusion of cholera in Egypt, 1947: a time-space analysis of one of the largest single outbreaks in the twentieth century". Journal of Historical Geography. 54: 24–37. doi:10.1016/j.jhg.2016.07.010.
- Sobocinski, André (20 September 2023). "Stemming the Tide: Navy Medicine and the Egyptian Cholera Epidemic of 1947". US Navy Medicine.
