= Yehia El-Fakharany =

Egyptian actor (born 1945)

- يحيى الفخراني
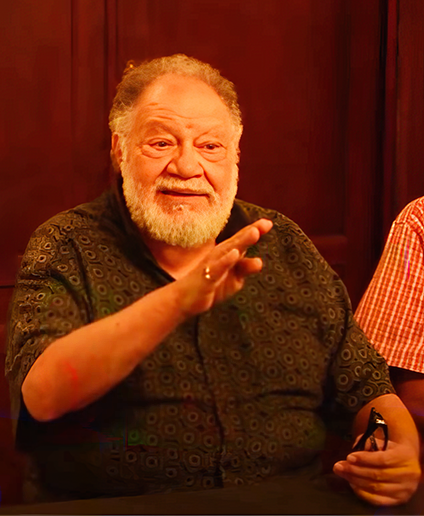
- Born: Yehia el-Fakharany; 7 April 1945 (age 81); Mansoura, Dakahlia Governorate, Egypt
- Education: Ain Shams University in Cairo
- Occupations: Television, film, and stage actor
- Years active: 1972–present
- Spouse: Lamis Gaber
- Awards: Carthage Film Festival Award (1984); Mustafa Amin and Ali Amin Award (1993); Faten Hamama Appreciation Award (2016); Abu Dhabi Festival Award (2020)

Yehia el-Fakharany (Arabic: يحيى الفخراني; born 7 April 1945) is an Egyptian television and film actor.

== Early life ==
El-Fakharany earned a bachelor's degree in medicine and surgery from Ain Shams University in Cairo in 1971. He was a member of the university's theatre troupe, and he won the best actor award at the level of Egyptian universities. After his graduation, El-Fakharany practiced medicine for a short period as a GP in the Medical Services Fund for Egyptian television.

== Personal life ==
Yehia el-Fakharany is married to Lamis Gaber, a Coptic physician and writer, author of the screenplay of "King Farouq" series (2007). They have two children (Shadi and Tarek), two grandsons (Yehia and Adam) and two granddaughters (Lamis and Salma).

El-Fakharany's eldest son Shadi el-Fakharany graduated from the Film Institute in the late 1990s, worked as an assistant director in some cinematic productions, and is currently in film directing. He has worked with his father on several projects, including the 2012 Ramadan series "The Foreigner Abd el-Qader" (Al-Khawaga Abd al-Qader, الخواجة عبد القادر). El-Fakharany's younger son, Tariq, works in business management, and previously acted alongside his father in the movie "Ali Baba's Trial" (Muhakamat Ali Baba, محاكمة علي بابا) in 1983.

== Career ==
He began his artistic career on stage where he starred in the play "Everyone with His Own Truth" (LiKullin Haqiqatuhu, لكلٍ حقيقته). After that he moved to television where he was cast in "Carefree Days" series (Ayyam Al-Marah, أيّام المرح) in 1972, and in 1979 he became famous for the series "My Dear Children, Thank You" (Abnai'y l-Aʿza', shukran, ًأبنائي الأعزاء شكرا) while the first film he starred in was "Ah, Ya Layl, Ya Zaman" in 1977 (آه يا ليل يا زمن) beside Warda Al-Jazairia and Rushdy Abaza. Since then, he has appeared in over 50 TV shows, 39 movies, and 9 plays.

=== Main TV drama series ===
One of the most important roles in Yehia el-Fakharany's career was in the Egyptian drama Al Helmeya Nights , whose events embodied modern Egyptian history from the era of King Farouk until the early 1990s. The series was written by screenwriter Osama Anwar Okasha, and created together with his lifetime friend, director Ismail Abdel Hafez. It was presented across 8 years in 5 parts, from 1987 to 1995. El-Fakharany plays Salim el-Badri Pasha, an aristocratic young man who returns to Egypt from his foreign mission during Sadat's "infitah," or open-door economic policy and inherits a property of his father, Ismail el-Badri. His role was played by the artist in the first four parts of the series, while he appeared as a guest of honor in the fifth part. Regarding the character of Salim el-Badri, El-Fakharany said: "The screenwriter offered me to play the character of the Mayor, but it was not clearly defined to me, so I did not accept it. Then he offered me the character of the Pasha, and I chose it immediately as it is a flesh and blood character that eats, drinks, loves and hates, so I loved it and made it real as much as the public loved it and was filled with its presence". More than 300 Egyptian artists participated in the series.

One of these was the character of "Abd al-Mutaal Mahjoub" in the series "No" (Lā, لا), through which he became a "persecuted employee" and El-Fakharany excelled such that screenwriter Mustafa Amin called him and said: “Had I not known Abd al-Mutaal, the hero of my novel personally, I would have imagined that he is you.” As for the role of Abd al-Mutaal, the actor said: "I find my first experience with Mustafa Amin a real pleasure, especially since my role in the series was completely new and never performed before [...]. The most beautiful thing about the whole work is the freedom the television provided in broadcasting this work without any objection".

Another major role was in "The Foreigner Abd el-Qader" (Al-Khawaga Abd al-Qader, الخواجة عبدالقادر), an Egyptian series produced in 2012 and premiered in Ramadan. It was written by the screenwriter Abdel Rahim Kamal who was inspired by the stories heard from his father during childhood, and directed by Shady el-Fakharany. The events of the series alternate between two periods of time, the first during World War II, which tells the story of Herbert Dobberfield, an alcoholic English man with suicidal tendencies who's awaiting death, until he travels to Sudan to work in a stone quarry and his view upon life changes dramatically. He gets acquainted with the mystic sheikh Abd el-Qader of whom he had had visions back in England, and slowly comes out of the state of depression while embracing Sufism. He then moves to Upper Egypt where he falls in love with a spiritual woman (played by the Syrian actress Sulafa Memar) and struggles to marry her despite her brother's refusal; the second period deals with the modern times in which the story of Herbert Dobberfield or "Al-Khawaga" Abd al-Qader is narrated after he has passed away by people who were his contemporaries and were deeply fond of him.

Screenwriter Abdel Rahim Kamal announced his return to cooperation with actor Yehya el-Fakharany and director Shady el-Fakharany in the 2021 Ramadan season with the TV series "Naguib Zahi Zarkash" (نجيب زاهي زركش), a comedy that talks about the relationship between a father and his children. The series "Naguib Zahi Zarkash" represents the fifth collaboration between Kamal and El-Fakharany, and the fourth between him and Yehya and Shady el-Fakharany after "Eagerness", 2015 (Lahfa, لهفة), "The Foreigner Abd el-Qader" and "Devil", 2016 (Wanous, ونوس), while the series "Hammam, the Arab's Shaykh", 2010 (Shayẖ El-ʿArab Hammam, شيخ العرب همام) was directed by Hosni Saleh.

El-Fakharany dubbed cartoon films produced by the Walt Disney Company, and narrated the film "The Yacoubian Building" (2006).

=== Theatre ===
Yehya el-Fakharany's major role is "King Lear" in an adaptation of Shakespeare's tragedy by director Ahmed Abdel Halim who turned it into a successful and popular theatrical work in Egypt. It was presented on the stage of the National Theatre in Cairo, using the music of the Egyptian composer Rageh Daoud and the poems of Ahmed Fouad Negm.

El-Fakharany's starred in the vaudeville "A night of A Thousand Nights", 2015 (Layla min 'Alf Layla, ليلة من ألف ليلة), also performed at the National Theatre in Cairo (Al-Jumhuriyya Theatre), recently restored, having been damaged in a fire 7 years prior. "A night of a Thousand Nights" was thus among the first shows performed on the new stage and witnessed unprecedented popularity and financial success. The performance is based on the poetry of Egyptian poet Bayram al-Tunisi accompanied by the music of Egyptian composer Ahmed Sedki, and is directed by Mohsen Helmy. The story revolves around Al-Shahhat (The Beggar) played by El-Fakharany, who is begging with his daughter by singing in the streets.

In an interview with famous Egyptian TV host Mona el-Shazly in 2015 while sitting on the very stage of the National Theatre, El-Fakharany made some relevant remarks about the vaudeville "A night of A Thousand Nights" and about his career in general, mentioning that he acts for the ordinary people because it's them who make up the public. His deep respect for his work and the public has him arrive at the rehearsals with sharp punctuality which is not easy to meet by his colleagues, as timing is not always a strong feature of the Eastern artists. El-Fakharany compared theatre to marriage, saying that he has to like the people he works with, otherwise the outcome may be compromised. Related to picking up roles that turn into successful performances, he quoted an inspiring byword in English: "There's always a risk for every great decision, but the risk of doing nothing is always much greater".

El-Fakharany rarely agrees to be interviewed as he prefers the public to associate him with his roles and he does not wish to interfere in their perception of him while appearing on social media.

=== Politics ===
In October 2020, Yehia el-Fakharany was sworn in as a member in the Egyptian Senate. El-Fakharany was appointed by the Egyptian President, Abdel Fattah el-Sisi, after he and artist Samira Abdel Aziz were chosen as representatives of Egyptian art within the Senate.

In December 2015, Lamis Gaber was appointed by President Abdel Fattah el-Sisi to the lower house of the Parliament, from among the 28 representatives whom the President of the Republic is entitled to appoint.

== Filmography ==
=== Television ===
Year	International Title	Arabic Title	Role
1973	The Man & the Smoke	Al-Ragul Wa-l-Dukhan, الرجل والدخان	Nofal
1979	Birds Without Wings	Tuyur Bela Agniha, طيور بلا أجنحة	Khalil
1979	My Dear Children, Thank you	Abnai'y l-Aʿza', shukran, أبنائي الأعزاء..شكراً	Ra'fat
1981	Fasting of Seyam	Seyam Seyam, صيام صيام	Seyam Afandy
1984	Life Again	Al-Hayat Maratun Ukhra, الحياة مرة أخرى	Ra'fat
1986	Passerby	A'ber Sabeel, عابر سبيل	D. Gameel Abou-Thoraya
1987	El-Ḥelmiyya Nights	Layali el-Ḥelmiyya, ليالي الحلمية	Selim el-Badry
1994	No	La, لا	Abdel-Met'al Mahgoub
1995	One Thousand and One Nights	Alf Laila Wa Laila, ألف ليلة وليلة	Shahryar/ Ali Baba/ Qasem
1996	Out of the Impasse	Al-Khoroj men Al-Ma'zaiq, الخروج من المأزق	Youssef El-Labban
1996	The Other Half of Rabie'	Nesf Rabie' Al-Akhar, نصف ربيع الآخَر	Rabie'
1997	Zezainya	Zezainya, زيزينيا	Beshr Amer Abdel-Zaher
1999	When the Fox Passed	Lamma Al-Ta'lab Fat, لما التعلب فات	Baher Al-Assal
2000	Opera Aida	Opera Aida, أوبرا عايدة	Sayed Opera
2001	Justice has Many Faces	Lel-Adala Wuguh Kathera, للعدالة وجوه كثيرة	Gaber Ma'moun Nassar
2002	Gohha the Egyptian	Gohha El-Masry, جحا المصري	Gohha
2003	The Night & the Last of it	Al-Layl Wa Akhruh, الليل وآخره	Rahaim Al-Menshawy
2004	Pure Abbas in a Black Day	Abbas El-Abyad Fi-l-Yaum Al-Aswad, عباس الأبيض في اليوم الأسود	Abbas El-Demairy
2005	The Berth & the Sailor	Al-Marsa Wa-l-Bahhar, المرسى والبحار	Fares Al-Araby
2006	El-Hilaly's Path	Sekket El-Hilaly, سكة الهلالي	Mostafa El-Hilaly
2007	Brought Up in His Strength	Yetraba Fi Ezzo, يتربى في عزو	Hamada Ezzo
2008	Sharaf Fath El-Bab	Sharaf Fath El-Bab, شرف فتح الباب	Sharaf Fath El-Bab Barakat
2009	The Son of El-Arandali (The Natty)	Ibn El-Arandali, ابن الأرندلي	Abdel-Badie' El-Arandali
2010	Hammam, the Arab's Shaykh	Shaykh El-Arab Hammam, شيخ العرب همام	Hammam
2012	The Foreigner Abd el-Qader	Al-Khawaga Abd al-Qader, الخواجة عبد القادر	Herbert Dopperfield (Abd el-Qader)
2014	Dahsha	Dahsha, دهشة	Basel Hamad El-Basha
2016	Wanoos	Wanoos, ونوس	Wanoos
2018	Family Size	Bel Hagm El-A'ely, بالحجم العائلي	Nader
2021	Naguieb Zahi Zarkash	Naguieb Zahi Zarkash, نجيب زاهي زركش	Naguieb Zahi Zarkash

=== Films ===
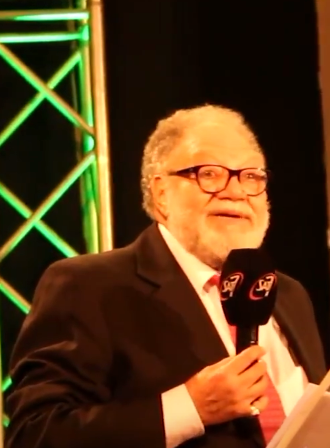
Yehia el-Fakharany releases a press statement; while being honored at the 65th Catholic Cultural Center Film Festival

Year	International title	Arabic Title	Role
1983	Love in Jail	Hub Fi-l-Zenzana, حب في الزنزانة	Farouk
1984	Left and never came back	Kharag wa lam ya'ud, خرج ولم يعد	Attia
1984	The Trial of Ali Baba	Muhakamat Ali Baba, محاكمة علي بابا	Salah Sulaiman
1985	Drugs	El-Keif, الكيف	Salah
1985	Execution of a Dead Man	I'dam Mayet, إعدام ميت	Abu-Gouda
1990	Humiliation	Al-Zul, الذل	Aziz Khazbak
1990	The Volcano	Al-Borkan, البركان	Hareedy
1992	Crime in the Depths	Garemma fe Al-A'maq, جريمة في الأعماق	Mohsin
1993	Land of Dreams	Ard al-Ahlam, أرض الأحلام	Ra'ouf
1995	Toy Story	Hikayat Lubat, حكاية لعبة	Woody (Egyptian Arabic dubbing)
1998	Mabrouk & Bolbol	Mabrouk wa Bolbol, مبروك وبلبل	Mabrouk
1999	Toy Story 2	Hikayat Lubat 2, 2 حكاية لعبة	Woody (Egyptian Arabic dubbing)
2006	The Yacoubian Building	ʿImarat Yakoubian, عمارة يعقوبيان	Narrator

== Awards and distinctions ==
El-Fakharany won about 50 awards during his artistic career, among them the Carthage Film Festival Award for the film "He went out and never came back" (Kharag wa lam yaʿud, "خرج ولم يعد") in 1984, the Catholic Cultural Center Award for the film "Return of a Citizen" (ʿAudat muatin, "عودة مواطن") in 1984 and the State Encouragement Prize in Arts from the Supreme Council of Culture in 1993. He also won the Cairo Arab Media Festival Award, the Award for Excellence in Acting from the 4th National Fiction Film Festival for "The Land of Dreams" (Ard el-Ahlamm, "أرض الأحلام"), and the Mustafa Amin and Ali Amin Award for the series "El-Ḥilmiyya Nights" (Layaly el-Hilmiyya, "ليالي الحلمية") in 1993.

El-Fakharany received the Faten Hamama Appreciation Award at the closing ceremony of the 38th Cairo International Film Festival in 2016.

The actor was awarded at the Abu Dhabi Festival in 2020 during a grand ceremony at the Cairo Opera House. Hoda al-Khamis Kanoo, founder of the Abu Dhabi Group for Culture and Arts and artistic director of the Festival, said at the award ceremony, "Today we honour with all gratitude Yehya el-Fakharany, the physician who chose the most difficult and tough profession, the profession of arts. He chose it with the belief that arts, culture, science and enlightenment are the basic pillars of humanity's renaissance, and most of all the pulse of our existence."

In 2025, El-Fakharani was designated Symbol of Arab Culture and was the guest of honor at the 11th Arab Poetry Day, organized by the Arab League Educational, Cultural and Scientific Organization.

El-Fakharani was awarded the distinction of Doctor Honoris Causa twice, the first one from the University of Wales in Cairo in 2013, together with Egyptian actor Nour El-Sherif, Nabila Ebeid, and the composer Omar Khairat, and the second one from Cape Breton University in Cairo in 2017, together with the Emirati artist Hussain Al Jassmi.
