= 200 Pounds =

2021 Egyptian film

- Directed by: Mohamed Amin
- Written by: Ahmad Abdalla
- Starring: Ahmed El Sakka; Laila Elwi; Hany Ramzy; Isaad Younis; Nelly Karim; Ahmed Rizk; Asser Yassin
- Release date: 25 August 2021
- Country: Egypt
- Language: Arabic

200 Pounds (Arabic: 200 جنيه) is a 2021 Egyptian ensemble drama film directed by Mohamed Amin and written by Ahmad Abdalla. The film revolves around the amount of 200 Egyptian pounds transferred from one person to another from different social classes and places.

It was the first film directed by Mohamed Amin since 2013.

== Cast ==
- Ahmed El Sakka as Hassan
- Laila Elwi
- Hany Ramzy
- Isaad Younis as Aziza El-Sayed
- Ahmed El Saadany as Antar, Aziza's son
- Nelly Karim
- Ahmad Rezk
- Asser Yassin
- Ghada Adel as Sabah
- Sabreen as herself
