= Ahmed El Saadany =

Egyptian actor (born 1979)

- أحمد السعدني
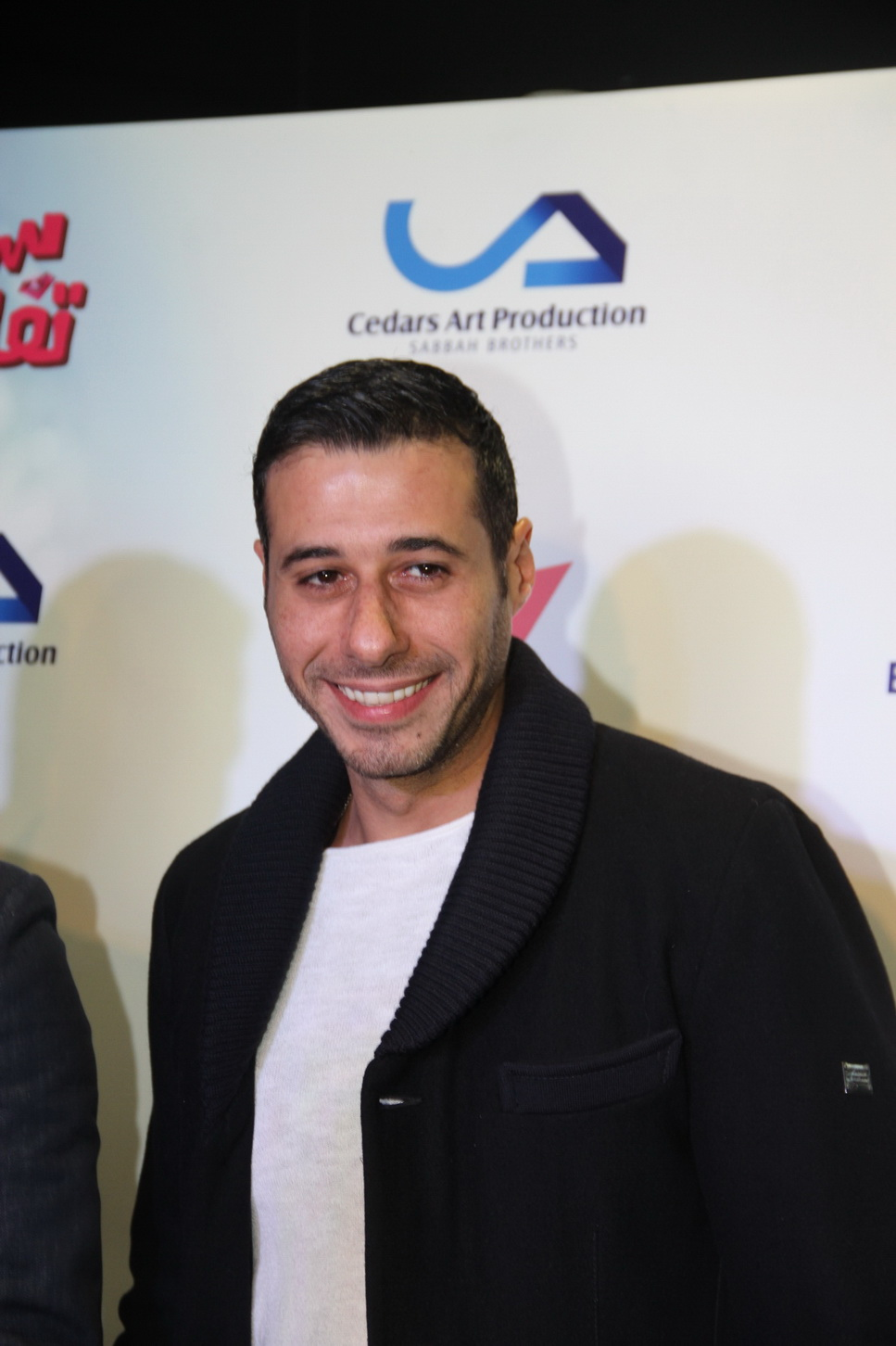
- El Saadany in 2015
- Born: Ahmed Salah El Saadany; July 16, 1979 (age 47); Mohandiseen, Giza, Egypt
- Occupation: Actor
- Years active: 1995–present
- Children: 2
- Father: Salah El-Saadany
- Relatives: Mahmud Sadani (uncle)

Ahmed Salah El Saadany (Arabic: أحمد صلاح السعدني; born July 16, 1979) is an Egyptian actor.

== Biography ==
El Saadany was born in Giza, Egypt. His father is Egyptian actor Salah El-Saadany. His uncle is writer and journalist Mahmud Sadani.

His acting career started in an episode of the television series Al Helmeya Nights with his father in 1995. He made his film debut in the 2004 movie Dignity Day.

He was cast in the film Morgan Ahmed Morgan in 2007 as a side character while the lead character was played by Adel Imam. The movie was a success. Since then, Ahmed's career has taken off and his been in several other films.

In 2012 he was cast in the television series Firqat Nagy Atallah, which was starred by Adel Imam. In Firqat Nagy Atallah, Ahmed El Saadany plays Hossam, one of the members of a team recruited by a retired Egyptian officer, played by Adel Emam, to carry out a daring heist against Israel’s largest bank. Hossam brings intelligence, strength, and sharp instincts to the gang.

He starred in the play Casanova alongside Hana El Zahed in Riyadh, Saudi Arabi in 2024 as part of Riyadh Season.

== Filmography ==
=== Film ===
Year(s)	Title	Role	Ref.
2004	Dignity Day	—	
2006	Wesh Egram	—	
2007	Morgan Ahmed Morgan	Mahmoud	
2008	Shaban el-Fares	—	
2008	Cheating Thieves	—	
2009	Aaz Ashab	Mohamed Amin	
2010	The Chord	Hasan Ragheb	
2012	The Deal	Yehya Abul-Izz	
2012	Unruly Friends	Tareq	
2015	Misunderstanding	Ahmed/Raouf	
2018	The Night of Hana and Suroor	Mr. Shehab	
2021	200 Pounds	Antar	
2022	The Spider	—	
2025	Al Gawahergy	—	
2025	Love, Imagined	—	

=== Television ===
Year(s)	Title	Role	Notes	Ref.
1995	Al Helmeya Nights	Majdi	1 episode	
2012	Naji Attallah's Squad	Hossam		
2014	Farq Tawqit	Yasser		
2016	El Khanka	—		
2016	Waad	Youssef	1 episode	
2016–2017	Red Sulfur	Moataz		
2019	Shebr Maiya	Yassin		
2020	Number Two	Hassan	1 episode	
2022	Betloo El Rooh	Omar		
2022	Menawara Be Ahlaha	Adam	1 episode	
2023	Seeb wana Aseeb	Ibrahim		
2023	His Hidden Secret	—		
2025	Lam Shamsiya	—		
