= Africano =

Africano may refer to:

- Africano (song), a song by Earth, Wind & Fire
- Africano (film), a 2001 Egyptian adventure comedy film
