= Safia El Emari =

Egyptian actress (born 1949)

- صفية العمري
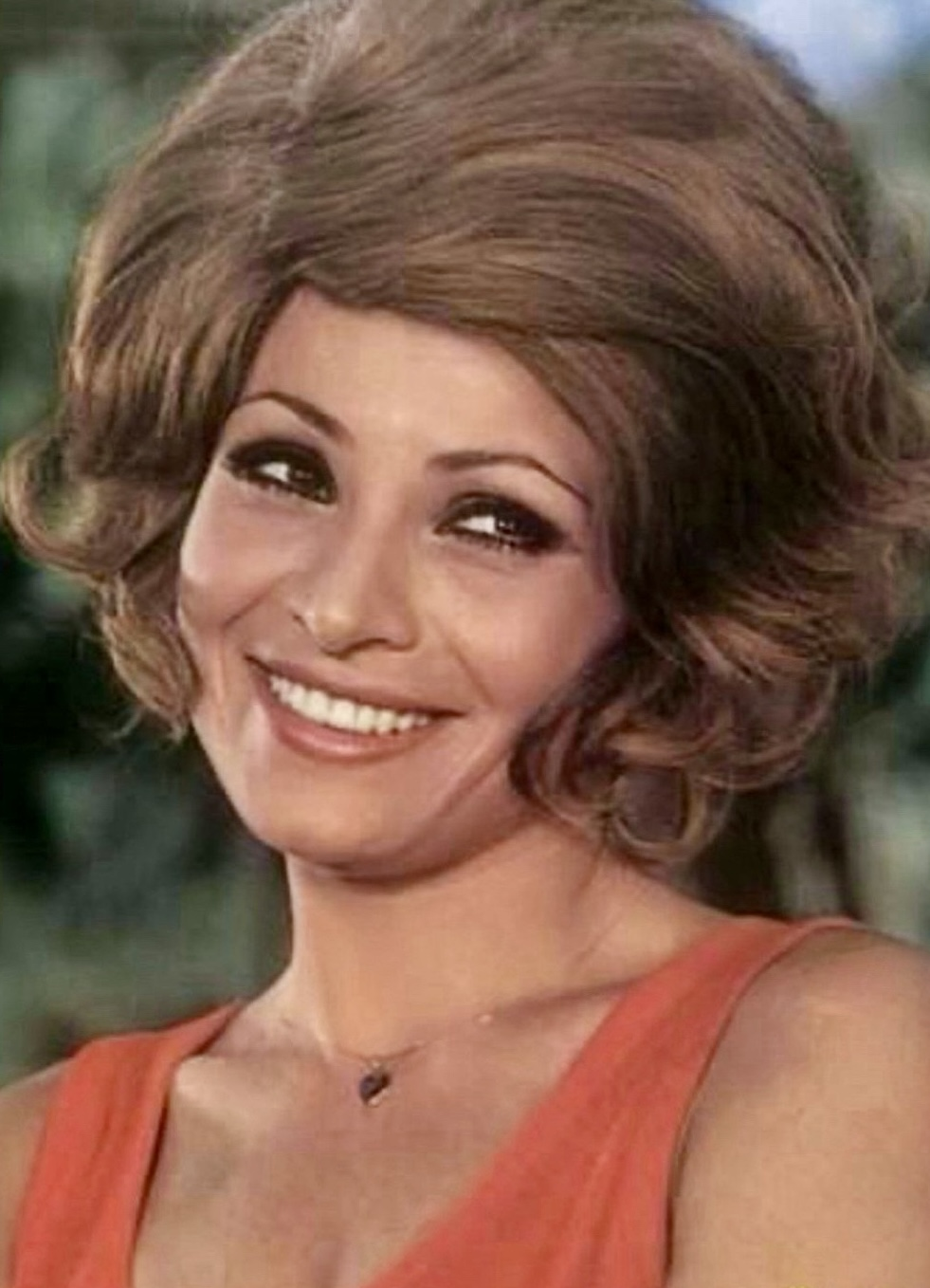
- Born: Safia Mustafa El Emari; October 20, 1949 (age 76); El-Mahalla El-Kubra, Egypt
- Education: Cairo University
- Occupation: Actress
- Years active: 1974–present
- Spouse: Galal Issa
- Children: 2

Safia El Emari (Arabic: صفية العمري), (born Safia Mustafa Mohamed Omari, October 20, 1949, in El-Mahalla El-Kubra) is an Egyptian actress.

== Biography ==
She was appointed as a goodwill ambassador for the United Nations in 1997, she resigned in 2006 in protest of the wars in the Middle East. She began her career as a journalist, after graduating from the Faculty of Commerce, Cairo University. She studied Russian language and worked as an interpreter at international conferences. She participated in many Egyptian movies and TV series.

She was discovered by the artist Galal Issa. They got married and have two sons.

== Filmography ==
- Opera Ayda (TV series)
- Al-massir
- El Mohager
- El Mowaten Masry
- Ana elli katalt Elhanash
- Ghosts of Sayala (TV series)
- Love Also Dies
- A'la bab El wazir
- Hekaya wara kol bab (TV movie)
- El-azab emra'a
- Hob La Yara El Shams
- La waqt lil-demoue'
- Hawanem garden city (TV series)
- Al Helmeya Nights (TV series)
- El beh el bawab
