= Nourhan =

Egyptian actress

- Born: Nourhan Ibrahim Shoeib; 15 January 1982 (age 44)
- Occupation: Actress
- Known for: 30 Youm (TV Series: 2017); Women with No Regret (2009)

Nourhan Ibrahim Shoeib (born 15 January 1982) is an Egyptian actress.

== Career ==
In 2009, Nourhan was featured in the television series directed by Jaber Nasser Al Rahma and Mamdouh Fahmy entitled, Women with No Regret.

She was featured in the 2017 film, Memory Card, directed by Khaled Mehran and written by Mahmoud Fleifal. Others featured include: Khaled Selim, Rania Mahmoud Yassin, Muhammad Najati and Izzat Abu Auf.

See News announced her participation in the musical programme, "Sound of Music", as a Project manager in the National Theatre Festival.

She starred in the 2020 television dram series, Our 80's Nights, written by Ahmed Abdel Fattah, directed by Ahmad Saleh.

== Filmography ==
=== Film ===
Year	Film	Role	Notes	Ref.
2017	Memory Card	Actress	Drama, Action	
2014	E'adam Bare'e	Actress	Drama	
2015	Al Moursy Abou El Abbas	Actress		
2003	The First Time You Fall in Love	Actress	Drama	
2002	Wahalaqat Altuyur Nahw Alshrq (Birds Flew East)	Actress	History	

=== Television ===
Year	Film	Role	Notes	Ref.
2020	Qut Al-Qulob	Actress	TV series	
2020	Our 80's Nights	Actress	TV series, Drama	
2017	30 Youm	Actress (Layla: 8 episodes, 2017)	TV series, Crime, Mystery	
2016	Gerab Hawa (Eve Pod)	Actress	TV series, Drama	
2016	Al Helmeya Nights	Actress (Bahera: 14 episodes, 2016)	TV series (1987-2016)	
2014	Ibn Halal	Actress	Action	
2009	Women with No Regret	Actress	TV series, Drama	
2001	El Hag Metwali's Family	Actress (Samira: 1 episode, 2001)	TV series, Drama	
