= Sherif Salama =

Egyptian actor (born 1979)

- Born: Sherif Salama Hasan; July 12, 1979 (age 46); Cairo, Egypt
- Occupation: Actor
- Years active: 1998–present
- Spouse: Dalia Mostafa
- Children: 2

Sherif Salama Hasan (born 12 July 1979 in Cairo) is an Egyptian actor. He began his career in 1998.

== Life ==
He was born into an artistic family. His father Salama Hasan is a theater director, and his older sister Manal Salama is an actress. He completed his study in the Higher Institute of Theatrical Arts.

His first role in acting was in A woman from the time of love TV series in 1998. His most famous roles were in Morgan Ahmed Morgan in 2007 with Adel Emam and Basma, Spies war in 2009 with Menna Shalabi and Bassem Yakhour, Thieves trap in 2009, The door in the door in 2011, Napoleon and Mahroosa in 2012 with Laila Elwi, The sin in 2014 with Shery Adel, Misunderstanding in 2015 with Cyrine Abdelnour, The black box in 2020 with Mona Zaki, Light black in 2020 with Haifa Wehbe, Shiqqa 6 in 2021.

He is married to actress Dalia Mostafa, they have two children together.

== Filmography ==
=== Film ===
Year	Film	Role
2005	Gazelle blood	
2005	Special course	Tamer Shahata
2007	Morgan Ahmed Morgan	Oday
2009	Thieves trap	Salah Saqata
2011	Love radio station	Hasan
2015	Misunderstanding	Omar
2017	Elbab yefawt amal	Tawfiq Tawfiq
2020	Ammar	
2020	The black box	Jaser
2025	Happy Birthday	Asser

=== Television series ===
Year	Name	Role
1998	Woman form time of love	
1999	The wolf	
2003	Abdeen family	
2003	The girls	
2004	Ya ward meen yeshtreek	Medhat
2004	Mahmood Almasri	Karim
2005	Land of men	
2005	Hadrat almotaham abi	Khaled
2007	The clinic 1	Nabil Salem
2009	Heaven of devil	
2010	Queen in exile	
2010	The shame	
2011–2014	The door in the door	Hesham Khalil
2012	Napoleon and Mahroosa	Ali
2014	The cactus coalition	Samer
2014	The sin	Yasine
2016	Love school	Omar
2016	The outgoing	Naser Mahmood
2017	Ramadan Kareem	Yousef
2017	Al jamaa 2	Shams Badran
2018	Alseham almareqa	Ammar
2019	Naseebi wa qasmeti 3	
2020	Waklinha Walaa 2	Salah
2020	in all weeks there are Friday	Dr Nadim Shokri
2020	Sokar Zeyada	Ramez
2020	Light black	Sayf Khatab
2021	Gazelle meat	
2021	Apartment 6	
2021	Secret revenge	
2022	Faten Amal Harby	Seif
2023	Full count	Ahmad Mokhtar
