= Gehad Hossam =

Jihad Hossam El-Din is an Egyptian actress who has participated in various cinematic and television works.

== Career ==
Jihad Hossam El-Din began her career at a young age by appearing in commercials. She studied Political science and obtained a master's degree in Development Management and Planning. She then transitioned to studying acting, attending several workshops in Egypt, Turkey, and France. Her professional breakthrough occurred in 2019 with her first television appearance in the series Qabeel.

== Works ==
=== Films ===
- New Year's Eve (Ras El Sana) (2020) – as Radwa.
- Difference of Experience (Far' Khebra) (2021) – as Nora.
- Shamareekh (2023) – as Raouf's Mother.
- Happy Birthday (2025) – as Clothing Store Seller (Guest appearance).

=== Television series ===
- Qabeel (2019).
- Why Not? 2 (Leh La' 2) (2021) – as "Saeeda".
- Family Group Tales (Hekayat Group El Elah) (2022) – as "Dina".
- Room 207 (El Ghorfa 207) (2022) – as "Huda".
- The Giza Killer (Saffah El Giza) (2023).
- Without Prior Warning (Bedoon Sabe' Enthar) (2024) – as "Noha".
- Between the Lines (Bein El Sotour) (2024) – as "Manar".
- Obligatory Course (Masar Egbari) (2024) – as "Haneen".
- Thulm Al-Mastaba (2025) – as "Nesma's Mother".
- Natural Disaster (Karetha Tabi'eya) (2025) – Starring as "Shorouk" alongside Mohamed Salam.
