= Execution of a Dead Man =

1985 film by Ali Abdel Khaleq

- DVD poster
- Arabic: إعدام ميت
- Directed by: Ali Abdel Khaleq
- Written by: Ibrahim Masoud
- Produced by: Tamido Film Production and Distribution
- Starring: Mahmoud Abdel Aziz; Farid Shawqi; Poussi; Yehia El-Fakharany; Laila Elwi
- Cinematography: Sa'eed Shimi
- Music by: Omar Khairat
- Release date: 4 March 1985
- Running time: 133 minutes
- Country: Egypt
- Language: Egyptian Arabic

"E'daa'm Mayet" (Egyptian Arabic: إعدام ميت, lit. 'Execution of a Dead Man') is a 1985 Egyptian drama and thriller film directed by Ali Abdel Khaleq and written by Ibrahim Masoud. It stars Mahmoud Abdel Aziz, Farid Shawqi, Yehia El-Fakharany, Poussi, and Laila Elwi. This movie is widely regarded as one of the classics of Egyptian cinema and is remembered for its narrative and undertones.

The story of E'daa'm Mayet draws inspiration from real-life cases during the tense political period between Egypt and Israel in the 1970s. The film's portrayal of the Dimona nuclear reactor shows the era's intelligence wars and the risks undertaken by operatives on both sides.

== Plot ==
In 1972, Mansour, an aide to Tubji and a collaborator with Israeli intelligence, is arrested and sentenced to death. The Egyptian Intelligence Service notes his close resemblance to officer Ezz al-Din and assigns Ezz to assume Mansour's identity to infiltrate Israeli circles and gather information on the Dimona nuclear reactor.

Mansour trains Ezz extensively on his behavior, personality, and lifestyle, except his relationship with a woman named Poussi. Ezz then enters Israel posing as Mansour. Poussi begins to suspect his true identity and attempts to expose him to Abu Juda, a representative of Mossad. She claims that he is not the real Mansour. However, her efforts fail, and Abu Juda kills her.

After Ezz successfully completed his mission, Mansour's father learned his identity and informed Abu Juda. He asked that Israeli intelligence secure his son's return. Egyptian and Israeli services then arranged a swap: three Israeli pilots and Mansour were exchanged for Ezz. At the prisoner exchange site, Sheikh Massa'd Tubji (Mansour's father) takes justice into his own hands by killing his son to cleanse the shame of betraying the homeland.

== Cast ==
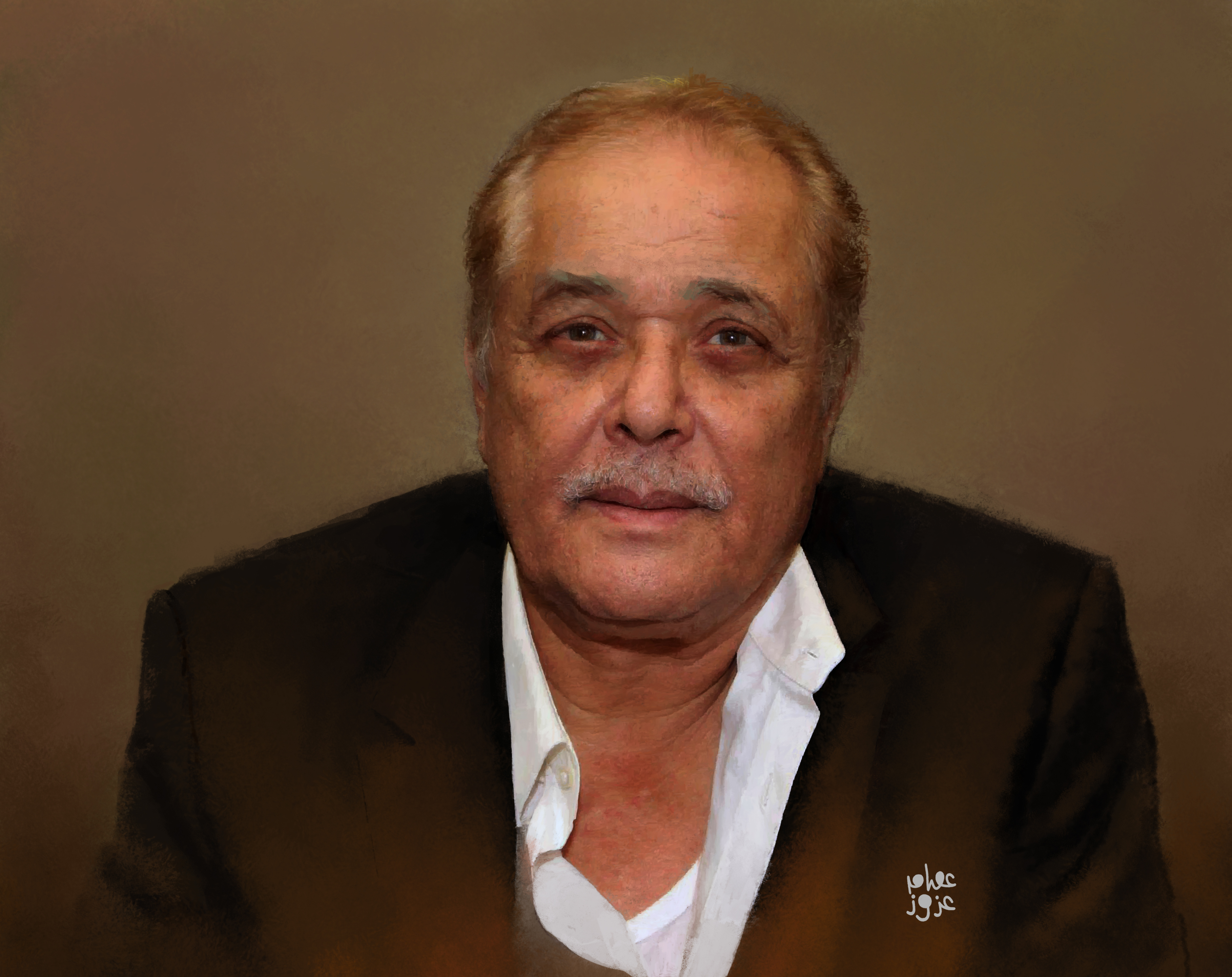
Mahmoud Abdel Aziz, the star of the film

- Mahmoud Abdel Aziz as Mansour Massa'd Al-Toubi / Ezz El-Din
- Farid Shawqi as Mohy
- Poussi as Sahar - Mossad Agent
- Yehia El-Fakharany as Abu Juda
- Laila Elwi as Fatima Massad Al-Toubi
- Ibrahim El-Shamy as Sheikh Massad Al-Toubi
- Shaaban Hussein as Bahnasawei - Intelligence Officer
- Souheila Farhat as Aniza - Mossad Employee
- Abdel Ghani Nasser as Mossad Official
- Ahmed Abdel Kader as Saqr
- Abdullah Meshref as Shokry
- Youssef El-Assal as Mossad Official
- Hamdy Youssef as Head of Intelligence
- Mohamed Rashwan
- Sayed Mostafa
- Nihad Rami as Israeli Officer
- Samir Rostom as Airport Officer
- Ali Abdel Khalek as Abu Rabin - Mossad Officer

== Production ==
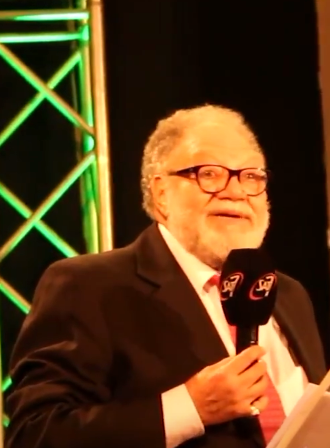
Yehia el-Fakharany gives a press statement while being honored at the 65th Catholic Cultural Center Film Festival.

The film was directed by Ali Abdel Khaleq, with a screenplay by Ibrahim Masoud and a musical score by Omar Khairat. At a seminar honoring late stars during the 65th Catholic Film Festival in March 2017, Abdel Khaleq stated that Mahmoud Abdel Aziz "cried intensely" after filming the execution scene and that he "fully embodied the character".

== Reception ==
E'daa'm Mayet has drawn both appreciative and critical commentary. In Akhbar Al Khaleej, Hassan al-Haddad described it as "disappointing" and "weak on multiple levels". He cites a disjointed dramatic structure and implausible events, while praising Hussein Afifi's editing, Ali Abdel Khaleq's direction, and Said Shimi's cinematography.

After Mahmoud Abdel Aziz's passing, he became the first actor to be mourned by the Egyptian General Intelligence Service. According to Major General Mohsen Al-Noamani, a former deputy of the agency, Abdel Aziz's portrayal of an intelligence officer in the film Execution of a Dead Man in his words:"highlighted the heroism and sacrifices of the agency's members". It was the reason the Egyptian Intelligence chose to honor him after his death.
