= Dalia Mostafa =

Egyptian actress and model (born 1980)

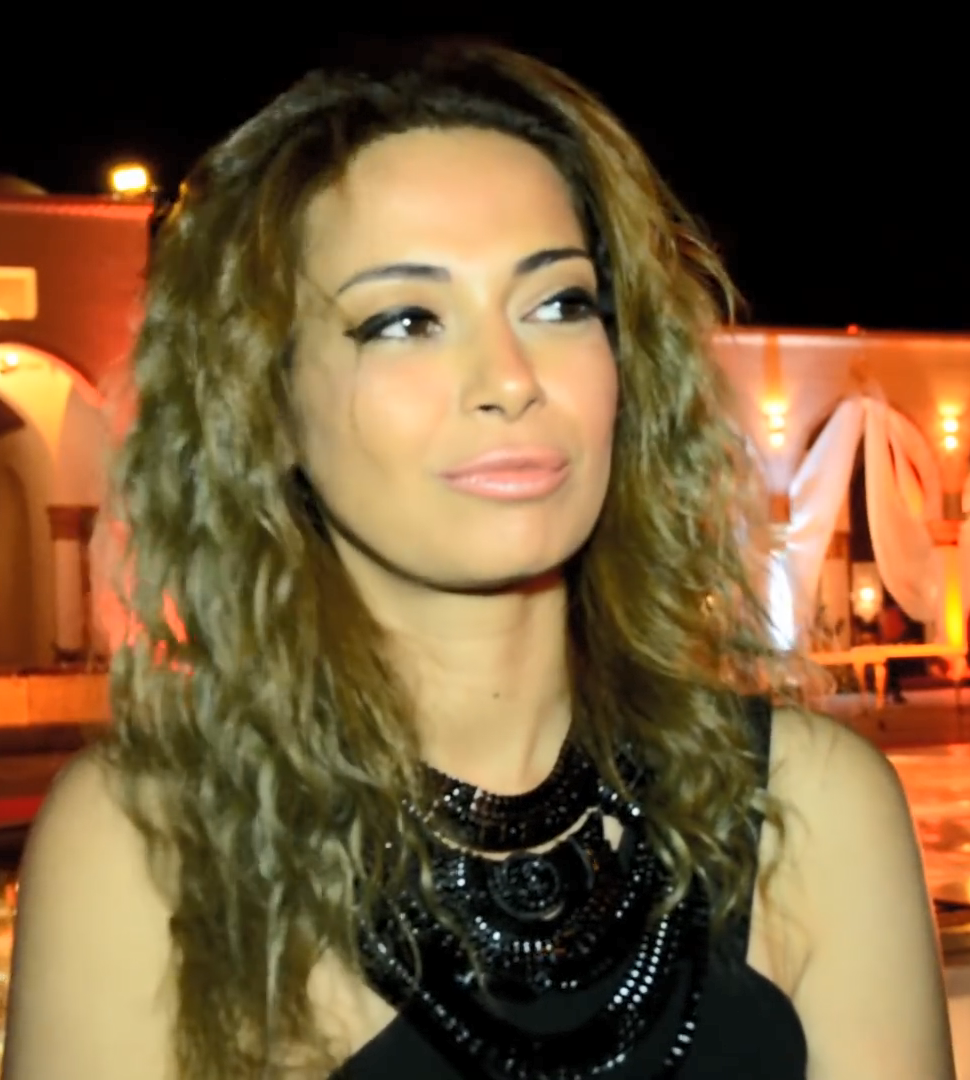
- Born: April 10, 1980 (age 46); Cairo, Egypt
- Occupations: Actress, model
- Spouse: Sherif Salama
- Children: 2

Dalia Mostafa (Arabic: داليا مصطفى; born on 10 April 1980) is an Egyptian actress and model. Mostafa was married to Egyptian actor Sherif Salama. She began her career as a TV advertisement model and started acting in 1995. As a model, Mostafa faced backlash for posting a photo in a bathing suit, prompting public conversations about the treatment of Arab women in Egypt.

== Works ==
=== TV series ===
Year	English name	Arabic name	Role
1995	Over time	فرط الرمان	
1995	Aldunia wamafeha	الدنيا و ما فيها	
1995	Day by day	يوم بيوم	
1995	Stories from our Neighbourhood	حكايات من حارتنا	
1996	Bet aljamaliya	بيت الجمالية	
1996	The heroes	الأبطال	Zamzam
1997	Seas of Expatriate	بحار الغربة	
1998	Response of my heart	رد قلبي	Baheya
1998	One Thousand and One Nights: that alkhal	ألف ليلة وليلة: ذات الخال	Ramin
1998	Rods of Illusion	قضبان من الوهم	
1999	Mawal of love and furious	موال الحب والغضب	
1999	Spear of fire	رمح النار	Maghferat
1999	The last train	القطار الأخير	
1999	Al-Layth ibn Sa'd	الليث بن سعد	Aisha bent abdulah ben Saleh
2000	Life managements	تدابير الدنيا	
2000	The dream and pain	الحلم والألم	
2000	Fiction of shallow	خيال الظل	Yusreya
2001	The women are coming	النساء قادمون	Nur
2001	The western land	البر الغربي	
2002	Helm ibn Alsabeel	حلم ابن السبيل	
2002	Where is my son?	أين ولدي	
2002	Al Khabeya	الخبيئة	
2002-2003	The Rebel	العصيان	Salwan abd raba
2003	The Girls	البنات	Shahenda
2003	Awlad Alakber	أولاد الأكابر	Husna Bakheet
2004	Stories of Father Farhan	حكايات بابا فرحان	
2004	The evils and goods	أشرار وطيبين	
2004	New Egypt	مصر الجديدة	Huda Shaarawi
2005	Me and those	أنا وهؤلاء	Sundus
2005	The repentance	التوبة	
2005	Abdul hamid academy	أكاديمية عبد الحميد	
2006	The mountain	الجبل	
2007	Eyes and ashes	عيون ورماد	
2007	Dunya	دنيا	Dunya
2009	The man and the way	الرجل والطريق	
2009	Merchant of happiness	تاجر السعادة	Fawzia
2010	The other October	أكتوبر الآخر	Samar
2010	Going with sun	رحيل مع الشمس	Sarab
2010	Dandoosh beakher Mafroosh	دندوش بيأجر مفروش	
2011	This night	تلك الليلة	
2012	Rose and thorn	ورد وشك	
2012	Trees of fire	أشجار النار	Nayesa
2012	Stories of women in the Koran	قصص النساء في القرآن	Maryam
2013	Temporary name	اسم مؤقت	Shajan
2014	I loved	انا عشق	
2014	Saraya Abdeen	سرايا عابدين	Narges
2015	After beginning	بعد البداية	
2016	Socks of Eve	جراب حواء	
2016-2017	The red sulfur	الكبريت الاحمر	Jermen
2019	The big house 2	البيت الكبير	Reem
2019	The Champs-Élysées tales	حواديت الشانزيليزيه	

=== Radio series ===
Year	English name	Arabic name
1995	The sunset	والشمس غربت
2010	My love story	قصة حبي

=== Movies ===
Year	English name	Arabic name	Role
1995	Heyam	هيام	
1998	Smile for picture looking beautiful	اضحك الصورة تطلع حلوة	Dalia
1999	The night talk	كلام الليل	
2000	Short, Undershirt and Cap	شورت وفانلة وكاب	Amina
2000	Why you let me love you	ليه خلتني أحبك	
2002	Let The Mind sober	خلي الدماغ صاحي	Neema
2005	Teach me love	علمني الحب	Madeeha
2008	Chef of president	طباخ الريس	Enshrah
2010	Bent men fi albald	بنت مين في البلد	
2014	Kabeer elhlm	كبير الحلم	

=== Stage ===
Year	English name	Arabic name
1995	Constitution, our masters	دستور يا أسيادنا
2003	In The Midday	في عز الظهر
