= The Sixth Day (film) =

1986 Egyptian film

- اليوم السادس
- Directed by: Youssef Chahine
- Written by: Youssef Chahine
- Produced by: Alain Benguigui; Thomas Verhaeghe
- Starring: Dalida; Mohsen Mohieddin; Shwikar; Hamdy Ahmed; Salah El-Saadany; Mohamed Mounir; Youssef Chahine; Zaki Abdel Wahab
- Cinematography: Mohsen Nasr
- Edited by: Luc Barnier
- Release date: 3 December 1986
- Countries: Egypt; France
- Language: Egyptian Arabic

The Sixth Day (Arabic: اليوم السادس, romanized: Al-Yawm as-Sādis; French: Le sixième jour), is a 1986 Egyptian comedy and drama film written and directed by Youssef Chahine. The film features Dalida, Mohsen Mohieddin, Shwikar, Hamdy Ahmed and Salah El-Saadany in the lead roles.

== Plot ==
In 1947, a cholera epidemic spreads in Cairo and other Egyptian cities. All infected people die within six days of the onset of the disease, and it is confirmed that all those hospitalized will die within six days. Seddika's grandson falls ill, so she flees with him to Rosetta, where she tries to treat him herself until the dangerous six days pass. Seddika travels outside Cairo to bury some of her relatives who died from cholera. When she returns, she learns that the child suffered a relapse after his school teacher, whom he considered a role model, contracted the disease and subsequently died, along with the thousands who died from cholera. Seddika, after losing her husband and all her family members, has no hope in life except for her grandson. On the boat, Awka the monkey sympathizes with her, loving her despite the age difference. They board a boat to sail across the Nile River. At sunrise on the sixth day, the grandson dies, and Seddika collapses.

== Cast ==
- Dalida
- Mohsen Mohieddin
- Shwikar
- Hamdy Ahmed
- Salah El-Saadany
- Maher Essam
- Sanaa Younes
- Mohamed Mounir
- Youssef Chahine
- Zaki Abdel Wahab
- Abla Kamel
- Khaled El Hagar

== See also ==
- List of Egyptian films of the 1980s
