= Mahmud Sadani =

Saudi Arabian writer (1928–2010)

Mahmoud El-Saadany
- محمود السعدني
- Born: Mahmoud Othman Ibrahim El-Saadany; 20 November 1927; Kafr Al Qarinayn, Menofia, Kingdom of Egypt
- Died: 4 May 2010 (aged 81); Giza, Egypt
- Occupations: Writer, journalist
- Relatives: Salah El-Saadany (brother); Ahmed El Saadany (nephew)

Mahmoud Othman Ibrahim El-Saadany, also transliterated as Mahmud Al-Saadani or al or el Saadani or Sa'dani (Arabic: محمود عثمان إبراهيم السعدني; 20 November 1927 – 4 May 2010) was an Egyptian satirical writer and journalist. He is considered one of the pioneers of satirical writing in the Arab press. He participated in editing and founding a large number of Arab newspapers and magazines in Egypt and abroad. He headed the editorship of Sabah Al-Khair, an Egyptian magazine in the sixties. As a Nassirist, he also participated in political life during the reign of President Gamal Abdel Nasser, and was imprisoned during the reign of Anwar Sadat after he was convicted of participating in a coup attempt.

El-Saadany issued and headed the editorship of the July 23 magazine in his exile in London. He returned to Egypt from his self-imposed exile in 1982 after the assassination of Sadat and was received by President Mubarak. He had relations with a number of Arab rulers such as Muammar Gaddafi and Saddam Hussein. He retired from journalism and public life in 2006 due to illness, and died in Giza on 4 May 2010, at the age of 81.

== Early life and career ==
Mahmoud Othman Ibrahim El-Saadany grew up in the Giza district of Greater Cairo. He is the older brother of the actor Salah El-Saadany. At the beginning of his journalistic career, he worked in a number of small newspapers and magazines that were published on Muhammad Ali Street in Cairo, after which he worked in the "Al-Kashkul" magazine, which was published by Mamoun Al-Shinnawi until its closure. Then he worked as a freelancer for some newspapers, such as Al-Masry newspaper, the mouthpiece of the Wafd Party. He also worked at Dar Al-Hilal. He also published, along with the cartoonist Toghan, a comic magazine that was shut down after a few issues.

== Works ==
El-Saadany's works were all in Arabic. In his books, he mainly used literary Arabic blended with Egyptian colloquialism as well of many satirical expressions he coined himself.

As of the end of 2022, none of his works were known to be published in any language other than Arabic. His books include:

- Egypt Revisited
- Amreeka ya Weeka
- A Donkey from the East
- Memoirs of the Mischievous Boy
- An Idler in the Lands of the African
