= Poussi =

Egyptian actress

- بوسي
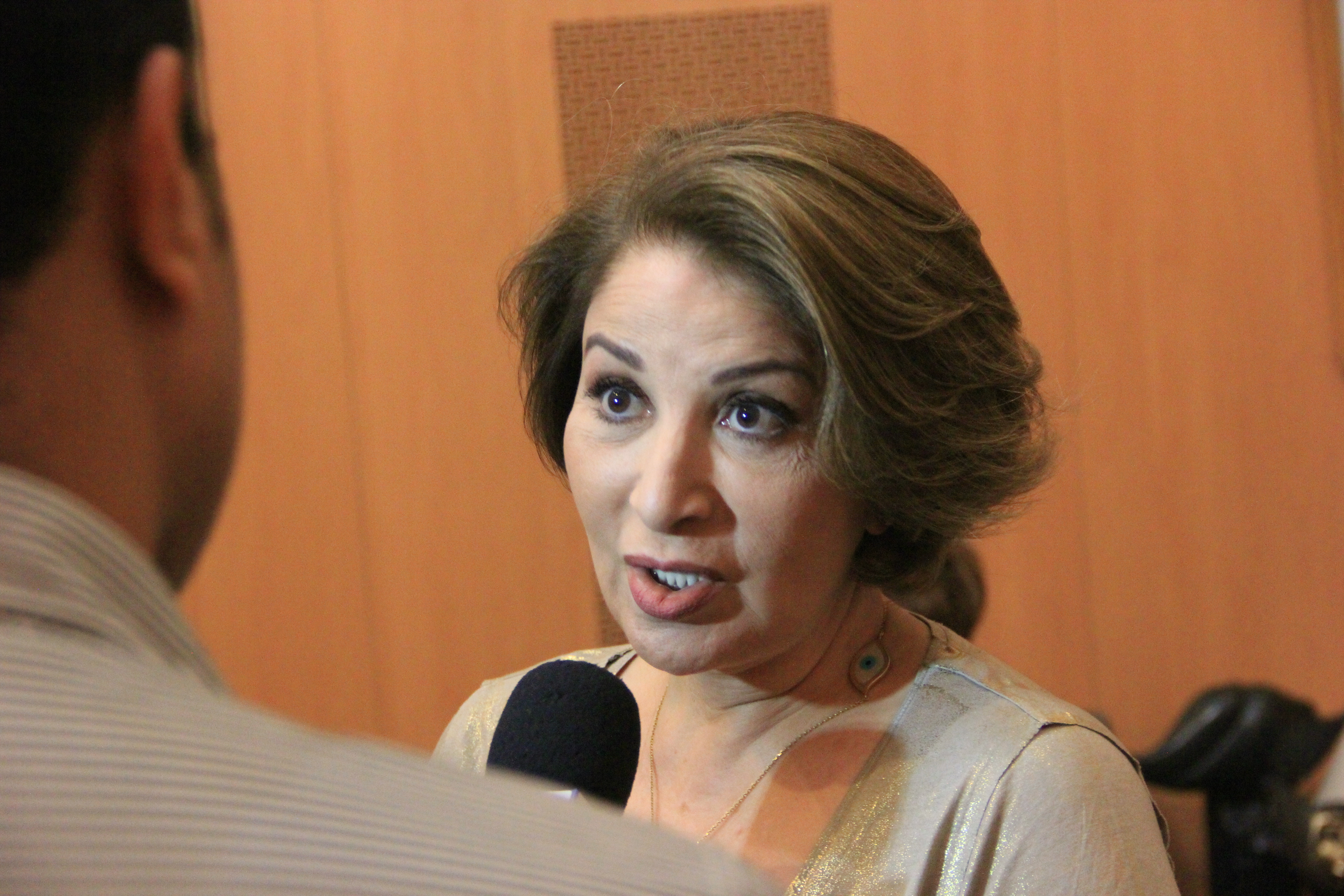
- Born: Sarvenaz Moustafa Qadri; November 26, 1953 (age 72); Cairo, Egypt
- Other names: Poussi, Poussy, Boussy
- Occupation: Actress
- Years active: 1961–present
- Spouse: Nour El-Sherif
- Children: 2

Poussi, Poussy or Boussy (Arabic: بوسي) real name Sarvenaz Moustafa Qadri (Arabic: صارفيناز مصطفى قدري; born 26 November 1953) is a Cairo-born Egyptian actress.

== Career ==
Poussy, whose real name is Safinaz Kadry, is an Egyptian actress who began acting when she was young. She appeared in films, children’s TV programs, and children’s theatre productions, including working with Ahmed Mazhar in Fire in My Chest. Later, she performed with the Stage Lights Triplet band in Romeo and Juliet and worked frequently alongside actors Farouk El Fishawy and Nour El Sherif. She eventually married Nour El Sherif, and they had three children: Sara, May, and Osama. She was also honored at the Asala Festival in Arish in 2003.

== Filmography ==
- Zawga Min Paris (" A Wife From Paris ", 1966) (Arabic: زوجة من باريس)
- Shey Min El Khouf (“ A Taste of Fear “, 1969) (Arabic: شيء من الخوف)
- Al Amaleqa (" The giants ", 1974) (Arabic: العمالقة)
- Lyaly Lan Taaood (" Nights that will never return ", 1974) (Arabic: ليالي لن تعود)
- Al Dahaya (" The victims ", 1975) (Arabic: الضحايا)
- Sana Ola Hobb (" First year in love ", (1976) (Arabic: سنة أولى حب)
- Seqan Fel Wahl (1976) (Arabic: سيقان في الوحل)
- Qwtta Ala Nar (" A cat on fire ", 1977) (Arabic: قطة على النار)
- Laenet Al Zaman ("The curse of time ", 1979)
- Al Aasheqa ("The Lover", 1980) (Arabic: العاشقة)
- Habibi Daeman ("My Eternal Love", 1980) (Arabic: حبيبي دائما)
- Fottowat Boulak (1981).
- Fettowat Al Gabal (1982).
- Marzooka (1983), (Arabic: مرزوقة)
- Al Zammar (1984).
- Al Shaytan Youghanny (1984).
- Fettewwet Al Nas Al Ghalaba (1984).
- E’daa’m Mayet (1985).
- Seraa Al Ayyam (1985).
- Al Zeyara Al Akheera ("The last visit"), 1986) (Arabic: الزيارة الأخيرة)
- Saat Al Fazaa (1986).
- Al Amaleyyya 42 (1987).
- Ragol Fe Fakh Al Nasaa (1987).
- Lebet Al Kobar (1987).
- Al Kammasha (1988).
- Zaman Hatem Zahran (1988).
- Shayateen Al Madina (1991).
- Ibn Al Gabal (1992).
- Leabet Al Entqam (1992).
- Karawana (1993).
- Al Aasheqan ("The Two Lovers" , 2000) (Arabic: العاشقان)
- Al Lahazat Allaty Ekhtafet (2001).

"Ahla Lahtha" ( The best moment) 2021
