= Riham Hagag =

Egyptian actress (born 1986)

- ريهام حجاج
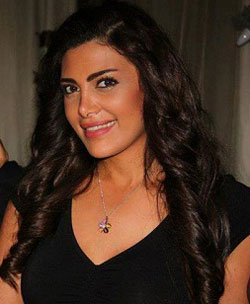
- Hagag in December 2015
- Born: September 22, 1986 (age 39); Milan, Italy
- Occupation: Actress

Riham Hagag (born September 22, 1986) is an Egyptian actress.

Hagag was born and raised in Italy.

She is married to businessman Mohamed Halawa.

== Filmography ==
=== Films ===
Year(s)	Title	Role	Notes	Ref.
2011	Safari	—		
2014	An Upper Egyptian	—		
2015	Misunderstanding	Sarah		
2015	Karam Al King	—		
2016	Mawlana	Nashwa		

=== Television ===
Year(s)	Title	Role	Notes	Ref.
2022	U-Turn	—		
2023	Gamila	—		
2024	Sodfa	—		
