= Morgan Ahmed Morgan =

2007 Egyptian movie

- Directed by: Ali Idris
- Written by: Youssef Maati
- Based on: Back to School
- Starring: Adel Emam; Mervat Amin; Sherif Salama; Basma Ahmed; Ahmed El Saadany
- Release date: July 4, 2007
- Country: Egypt
- Language: Arabic

Morgan Ahmed Morgan is an Egyptian comedy film, made in 2007, written by Youssef Maati, directed by Ali Idris, produced and distributed by Good News. The film stars Adel Emam, Mervat Amin, Sherif Salama, Basma Ahmed, Ahmed El Saadany, Amr Abdel Aziz, Ahmed Mekki, Mohammed Shoman and Youssef Dawood, The film is the third production of the Good News production company, budgeting 27 million Egyptian pounds. The plot was adapted from the American movie Back to School.

== Plot ==
The film is in the form of a satirical comedy. It is a mix of Arab societal problems such as the issue of education, the problems of young university students, the elections, and simple trading. The central character, Morgan Ahmed Morgan (Adel Imam), a successful businessman, has very good relations with many important figures, but suffers from a lack of knowledge due to his incomplete education, which is the only thing that cannot be hidden or purchased with his fortune and influence. His children convince him that he needs to study, and after a period of rejecting their offers, he agrees and joins the same university they attend, beginning a new phase of his life. He deals with the university with the logic of a businessman who is keen on making financial gains and contracting deals.

When Morgan enters the university, he does not become an isolated student but instead participates in a lot of activities, and initiates investment projects with the university administration as a professional businessman. His influence grows throughout all of the different student sectors; for example, he becomes the president of the drama club and the captain of the football team and maintains close contact with all the students, regardless of whether they belong to liberal or radical extremist groups.

The film deals with the issue of nomination for the parliamentary elections, as Morgan seeks to run for parliament in order to obtain immunity to protect his business excesses and interests. His rival in the elections is a university-educated professor, Jeyhan (Mervat Amin). His children love her and back her against him in the election campaign. However, Morgan wins, illustrating the extent to which power can be bought or attained through the use of unfair tactics by those who do not deserve it.

Family problems between Morgan and his children arise when he cheats on his first exam because he did not study. His daughter Alia (Basma Ahmad) is disappointed in him, saying “we are not honored that you are our father.” He then slaps his daughter across the face, and she goes into psychological shock. Morgan comes to his senses and reconciles with his children, deciding to finish his studies. After receiving his degree, he proposes to Professor Jeyhan Murad, a long running unrequited love interest since he joined the university, but who only sees him as a life partner when he earns his degree. Everybody has a price.

== Reception ==
In 2012, the actor Adel Imam was found guilty of defaming Islam with his role in this film, by mocking Muslim symbols like beards and the jilbab.
