= Lamis Gaber =

Egyptian politician

- Born: 13 August 1947 (age 79); Shubra
- Citizenship: Egypt
- Occupations: Politician, Writer, Screenwriter

Lamis Gaber is an Egyptian politician. Gaber is a member of the Egyptian Parliament. Gaber is also a political writer and physician.

== Personal life ==
Gaber's husband is Yehia El-Fakharany. Gaber's children are Shady and Tarek El-Fakharany. Gaber’s grandchildren are Yehia, Adam, Lamis and Salma.
