= Samir Chamas =

Lebanese actor, writer and journalist (1942–2024)

- سمير شمص
- Samir Chamas
- Born: 25 November 1942; Hermel, Lebanon
- Died: 11 August 2024 (aged 81)
- Occupations: Actor, Writer, Journalist, Voice Actor
- Years active: 1965–2024
- Spouse: Siham Abu Al-Izz
- Children: Rabih; Rima
- Website: samirchamas.com

Samir Chamas (Arabic: سمير شمص, 25 November 1942 – 11 August 2024) was a Lebanese actor, writer, journalist and voice actor.

== Career ==
In the later half of the 1960s, Chamas starred, wrote, and acted in many films, including: "Safar Brlik", "Daughter of the Guard", "Bitter Grapes", "Al-Shiridan", and "Dawba Street", along with him acting in films from Egypt, like "3 women" and "Seeks for Freedom".

In television, Chamas starred in various series, including “A Man of the Past”, the "Bitter Honey", "A Woman from the Time of Love" with the Egyptian Samira Ahmed, and the series "The Face of the Moon". Chamas also did dubbing work for many animated series.

in 2006, he published a science fiction novel, "At the Edge of the Universe", which includes information about space and the solar system and the planets.

== Personal life and death ==
Chamas married Siham Abu Al-Izz and he had two children, Rabih and Rima. Chamas died on 11 August 2024, at the age of 81.

== Filmography ==
=== Film ===
Year	Title	Role	Notes	Sources
1964	El Asam Al Murr			
1985	Gharo			
1965	Al Sharidan			
1965	Al Jakouar Al Sauda'			
1977	Bint El-Harras			
1967	Safar Brlk			
1967	Share' El Dabab			
1968	Thalath Nessa	Sami		
1969	Kolena Feda'youn			
1971	Amwaj			
1971	Alem El Shohra			
1974	Ajmal Ayam Hayati			
1983	Bye Bye, Ya Helwa			
1983	Samehni Ya Habibi			
1984	Al Jiha Al Khamesa			
1984	Hobi Alathi La Yamout			
1985	Al Be'r			
1999	Ayen El Shoq			
2000	Mada Al Umr			
2001	Africano	Mr. Joe		
2004	Al Bahth An Al Hourrya			

=== Television ===
- Spotlight. 2011
- The Old Love - Abu Nadeem. 2011
- Al Armala W Al Shaytan. 2011
- Nos Darzan. 2009
- Tuff Incident. 2007
- Khataya Saghira. 2005
- Bayn El Sama Wal Ard. 2003
- Face of the Moon. 2000
- Arabic Language Club. 1998
- The Adventure - Ramzi. 1978
- The White Mask. 1974

=== Dubbing roles ===
- Mokhtarnameh – Muhammad ibn al-Hanafiyyah
- Planes – Skipper
- Planes: Fire & Rescue – Skipper
- The Smurfs – Papa Smurf (Image Production House version)

== Bibliography ==
- Einda Hafat al-Kawn (English: At the Edge of the Universe)
