= Faten Amal Harby =

2022 Egyptian television series

- Written by: Ibrahim Eissa
- Directed by: Mohamed Al-Adl
- Starring: Nelly Karim; Sherif Salama
- Music by: Khaled Al Kammar
- Country of origin: Egypt
- Original language: Arabic
- No. of episodes: 30

Original release
- Release: April 2 – May 1, 2022

Faten Amal Harby is a 2022 Egyptian drama television series released during Ramadan starring Nelly Karim and Sherif Salama. Directed by Mohamed Al-Adl and written by Ibrahim Eissa, the series discusses many issues, including marriage, child custody, and other issues of concern to women.

The series drew controversy for criticizing the Personal Status Law in Egypt.

== Plot ==
The series revolves around a social drama about Faten's tragedy with her husband and her marital problems with him, which leads her to decide to separate from him, believing that she has succeeded in eliminating her problems. However, she faces other crises due to some provisions of the Personal Status Law, which stipulates that she will be deprived of her two daughters if she marries someone else, and then the events escalate.

== Cast ==
- Nelly Karim as Faten Amal Harby
- Sherif Salama as Saif El-Dandarawy
- Mohamed El Sharnouby as Sheikh Yahya
- Fadya Abdel Ghany as Nazima
- Hala Sedki
- Khaled Sarhan
- Mohamed Tharwat
