= Misunderstanding (2015 film) =

2015 Egyptian film

- Movie poster
- Directed by: Ahmed Samir Farag
- Written by: Mohamed Nayer
- Starring: Cyrine Abdelnour; Sherif Salama; Ahmed El Saadany
- Production companies: Eagle Films; Cedar Arts
- Release date: February 11, 2015
- Running time: 114 minutes
- Country: Egypt
- Language: Arabic

Misunderstanding (Arabic: سوء تفاهم) is a 2015 Egyptian romantic comedy film written by Mohamed Nayer and directed by Ahmed Samir Farag. The film stars Cyrine Abdelnour, Sherif Salama, and Ahmed El Saadany.

== Plot ==
Omar (Sherif Salama) tries to recover his father's inheritance that his uncle seized, so he seeks help from his college friend Raouf (Ahmed El Saadany), who turns out to be a conman working in the diamond trade who then flees to Lebanon. Omar goes to prison, and a Lebanese girl named Lina (Cyrine Abdelnour) falls in love with Raouf, deceived by what she saw in him. They agree to get married, but he escapes that night, and her friend discovers that he is in Egypt, so she decides to set up an ambush for him where he is, and there Lina and Omar's paths cross after he gets out of prison.

== Cast ==
- Cyrine Abdelnour as Lina Fawaz
- Sherif Salama as Omar
- Ahmed El Saadany as Ahmed/Raouf
- Riham Hagag as Sarah
- Khaled Eleish as Atef
- Maha Abou Ouf as Julie
- Bayoumi Fouad
- Youssef Fawzy
- Ashraf Meslehi
