= Nadia Al-Iraqia =

Iraqi actress (1963–2021)

Nadia Al-Iraqia فاتن فتحي
- Born: Faten Fathy; 3 August 1963; Babylon, Iraqi Republic
- Died: 16 May 2021 (aged 57); Cairo, Egypt
- Occupation: Actress
- Years active: 1997–2021

Nadia Al-Iraqia (born Faten Fathy; 3 August 1963 – 16 May 2021) was an Iraqi actress. She had roles in the films Africano, Can't Complain, Theyab Al-Lail and Dokkan Shehata.

== Career ==
She started her acting career professionally in 1997 with the television serial Theyab Al-Lail. The serial became popular in television where she played the role 'Fatima'. With the success of the serial, she received several television serials in the following years, including: Zeezinya in 2000, Leqaa ala al hawaa in 2004 and popular serial Raya wa Sekina in 2005. In the meantime, she acted in the Egyptian adventure comedy film Africano directed by Amr Arafa. She played a supporting role as 'Customer' in the film. The film received critical acclaim and screened at several film festivals.

Then Nadia acted in the television serials: Al-andaleeb hikayt shaab in 2006 and documentary Can't Complain in 2007. In the same year 2007, she was invited to act in the feature film Keda Reda, which became her first popular cinema appearance. After several television serials, she became popular with the 2013 television serials Selssal El Dam and Al Qaserat.

== Death ==
She died on 16 May 2021, after contracting COVID-19.

== Filmography ==
| Year | Film | Role | Genre | Ref. |
|---|---|---|---|---|
| 1997 | Theyab Al-Lail | Fatima | TV series | |
| 2000 | Zeezinya | Umm Nizar | TV series | |
| 2001 | Africano | Customer | documentary | |
| 2004 | Leqaa ala al hawaa | | TV series | |
| 2005 | Raya wa Sekina | Alia | TV series | |
| 2006 | Al-andaleeb hikayt shaab | | TV series | |
| 2007 | Can't Complain | Fatima | documentary | |
| 2007 | Keda Reda | | Film | |
| 2008 | Al Zamhlawiyah | | documentary | |
| 2008 | Dokkan Shehata | | Film | |
| 2008 | Share' 18 | | Film | |
| 2009 | Bel-Alwan Al-Tabi3eya | | Film | |
| 2010 | Al-Kebar | | Film | |
| 2010 | 3a2elat Mickey | | Film | |
| 2010 | Kallemni Shukran | | Film | |
| 2010 | Ayza Atgawez | Sondos | TV series | |
| 2011 | Ana Badee3 Ya Wadee3 | | Film | |
| 2011 | Kaff Al-Qamar | | Film | |
| 2012 | 3ala Wa7da Wa Noss | | Film | |
| 2012 | Private Number | | TV series | |
| 2012 | Juliet's Pants | | Film | |
| 2012 | Al-Almany | | Film | |
| 2013 | El Ragol El A'inab | | TV series | |
| 2013 | The Biggest Liar | Hoobi's mother | TV series | |
| 2013 | Selssal El Dam | Umm Salah | TV series | |
| 2013 | Al Qaserat | Umm Saudi | TV series | |
| 2013 | Tatta7 | | Film | |
| 2014 | Bent Men Dar Al-Salam | | Film | |
| 2014 | Kalam Garayed | | Film | |
| 2016 | Banat Kharqat (Banat Superman) | | TV series | |
| 2016 | Party Fi Harty | | Film | |
| 2018 | Azmi & Ashjan | | TV series | |
| 2019 | Baku Baghdad | | TV series | |
| 2019 | Al-Dhaher | | TV series | |
| 2019 | El-Zoga 18 | | TV series | |
| 2020 | Etneen Fel Sandoq | | TV series | |

== See also ==
- Cinema of Egypt
- Cinema of Africa
