= Nashwa Mustafa =

Egyptian actress

Nashwa Mustafa نشوى مصطفى
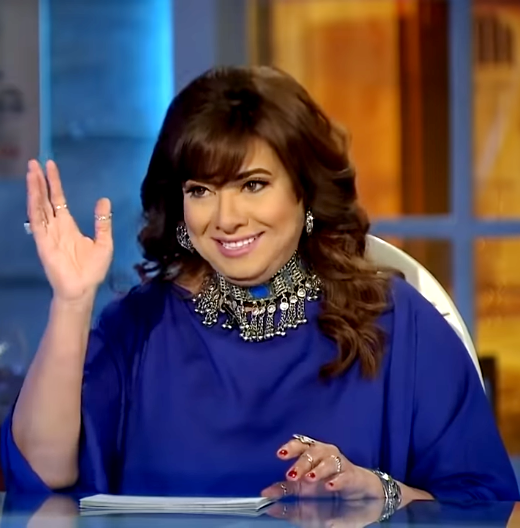
- Born: Nashwa Mustafa; October 15, 1968 (age 57); Cairo, Egypt
- Education: Ain Shams University
- Occupation: Actress
- Years active: 1991–present

Nashwa Mustafa (born 15 October 1968), is an Egyptian Actor. She is best known for the roles in the films; El-Rehla, El-Farah and in the television shows; The Family of Mr Shalash and Mahmoud the Egyptian.

== Personal life ==
Nashwa Mustafa was born on 15 October 1968 in Cairo, Egypt.

She is married to Mohammed Emad, who lived in USA for a long period of time. However he returned Egypt to have a religious wedding according to their tradition. They married in 1993 and have two children, Maryam and Abdulrahman. Her son Abdulrahman married in July 2019.

== Career ==
She started her television career in 1990 in the popular comedy serial The Family of Mr Shalash, she played the role 'Enas' in the serial. Her next role was in the serial Conscience of Teacher Hikmat. She played the role 'Abeer' in that serial. Then in 1999, she made her film debut with the film El-Farah. In 2001, she acted in the popular Egyptian adventure comedy film Africano, where she played the role 'Zainab'. The film was theatrically released and made its premier on 11 July 2001 in Egypt.

In 2013, she hosts the television program Cash Taxi, which was the Egyptian version of British international game show Cash Cab (British game show). The program telecast on MBC Masr.

In 2017, she made the television program Three in One. In 2018, she produced the stage play Selfie Ma’a el-Mot, which was first performed on Miami Theatre. Previously the play was named as Selfie Ma’a Sayedna, but later changed because of the Media Control Department obligations.

== Filmography ==
Year	Film	Role	Genre	Ref.
1990	The Family of Mr Shalash	Inas	TV series	
1991	Conscience of Teacher Hikmat	Abeer	TV series	
1992	Al Helmeya Nights	Nahed	TV series	
1997	Zeezinya	Rezqa	TV series	
1998	Nahnou La Nazraa Al Shawk	Kawthar	TV series	
1999	El-Farah	Madiha	Film	
2000	Film sakafi	Esmat	Film	
2001	Africano	Zainab	Film	
2001	El-Rehla		Film	
2002	El ragol el abiad el motawasset	Oufa	Film	
2002	El-Limby		Film	
2002	Thieves in KG2	Etidal	Film	
2003	Mido mashakel	Nahed	Film	
2003	Malak rohi	Salwa	TV series	
2003	Awlad Al Akaber		TV series	
2004	Mahmoud the Egyption	Fatima	TV series	
2005	Sayed el atifi	Barbie	Film	
2007	Rash Boy Dreams	Haiam	Film	
2008	Shebh Monharef		Film	
2012	Majmuat Insan		TV series	
2014	Alekhwa	Najwa	TV series	
2018	El Shreet el Ahmr	Karawana	TV series	
2020	Shaw-Ming		Film	
