= Africano (film) =

2001 Egyptian film directed by Amr Arafa

Africano Африканец
- Egyptian Arabic: أفريكانو
- Directed by: Amr Arafa
- Written by: Mohamed Amin
- Produced by: Amr Arafa; Hosam Ibrahim
- Starring: Ahmed El Sakka; Mona Zaki
- Cinematography: Sameh Selim
- Music by: Hosam Ibrahim
- Release date: 11 July 2001 (Egypt)
- Running time: 110 min.
- Country: Egypt
- Language: Egyptian Arabic
- Budget: EGP 7,100,000 (est.)

Africano, is a 2001 Egyptian adventure comedy film directed by Amr Arafa as his directorial feature debut and co-produced by director Amr Arafa himself with Hosam Ibrahim. It stars Ahmed El Sakka and Mona Zaki.

The film was theatrically released and made its premier on 11 July 2001 in Egypt. It received critical acclaim and later screened in nearby African countries as well as Europe. In Kuwait, the film made its premier on 31 October 2001 whereas in Greece, it was released at the Greek Film Archive on 28 February 2012.

== Synopsis ==
Badr is a young veterinarian who loves his profession, but he faces many obstacles that prevent him from achieving his ambition. He dreams of traveling to his uncle, who immigrated many years ago to South Africa, where he can work in a scientific atmosphere that appreciates his field. He is surprised, after his uncle’s death, that he has to travel to share in the inheritance. With his cousin, according to the uncle’s will, in the estate, which is an open zoo. There he meets Gamila, his cousin, and their relationship from the first moment appears to be a fierce and an uncomfortable relationship, and everyone is surprised that there is a terrible danger threatening them with losing the zoo, so they unite their efforts in order to save their land, and their dreams.

== Cast ==
- Ahmed El Sakka as Badr
- Mona Zaki as Gamila
- Hassan Hosny as Shakir
- Ahmed Eid as Esam
- Nashwa Mustafa as Zainab
- Tal'at Zein as Adam
- Sami Sarhan as Vet
- Suliman Eid as Policeman
- Nadia Al-Iraqia as Customer
- Bayhas Alirtemat as African Macho
- Hosam Ibrahim as African matcho
- Samir Chamas as Mr. Joe

== See also ==
- Egyptian cinema
- List of Egyptian films of the 2000s
