= Hanan Motawie =

Egyptian actress (born 1975)

- حنان مطاوع
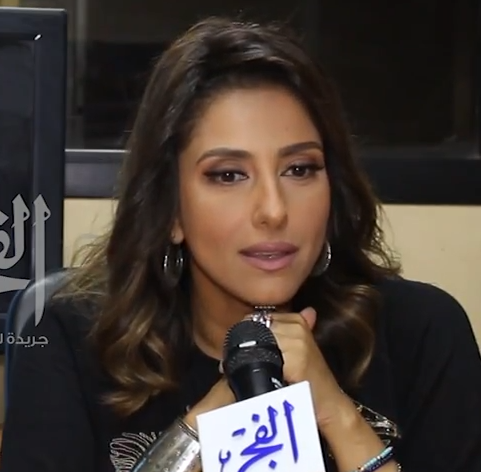
- Born: 23 February 1975 (age 51); Giza, Egypt
- Education: Cairo University
- Occupation: Actress

Hanan Motawie (Arabic: حنان مطاوع; born 23 February 1975) is an Egyptian actress. She is a recipient of Best Supporting Actress for her performance in the film Qas we Lazq.

In 2021, she won Hope International Film Festival Best Actress Award for her role in the film Qabel Lel-Kasr (Fragile).

== Early life and education ==
Born in Giza to the family of Karam Motawie and Soheir El-Morshedy. Motawie studied Commerce at Cairo University.

== Career ==
Motawie's first appearance was in 2001 where she starred in Hadith Elsabah wa Elmasaa (Dialogues of Morning and Night). Starring in Bent Al-Qabail (Daughter of Tribes) series also won her accolades.

== Filmography ==
- Hadeeth El Sabah we el Masaa
- Qas we Lazq
- Al Ghaba (The Forest)
- Heliopolis
- Sero Bataa
- Woud Sakhia
- Happy Birthday
- Al-Mamar
- Qarar Abe
- Al Hakeem
- Ward
