= Happy Birthday (2025 film) =

- Theatrical release poster
- Directed by: Sarah Goher
- Written by: Sarah Goher; Mohamed Diab
- Produced by: Ahmed Abbas; Ahmed Badawy; Ahmed El Desouky; Jamie Foxx; Datari Turner
- Starring: Nelly Karim; Hanan Motawie; Sherif Salama; Ali Sobhi; Doha Ramadan
- Cinematography: Seif El Din Khaled
- Edited by: Ahmed Hafez
- Music by: Mina Samy
- Production company: Foxxhole Productions
- Release dates: June 5, 2025 (Tribeca); October 16, 2025 (Egypt)
- Running time: 96 minutes
- Country: Egypt
- Language: Egyptian Arabic

Happy Birthday (Egyptian Arabic: هابي بيرث داي) is a 2025 Egyptian coming-of-age drama film co-written and directed by Sarah Goher in her directorial debut. It stars Nelly Karim, Hanan Motawie, Sherif Salama, Aly Sobhy and Doha Ramadan. It follows an 8-year-old maid who throws a birthday party for her upper-class friend.

Happy Birthday had its world premiere at the 24th Tribeca Film Festival on June 5, 2025, where it was honored with the Best International Narrative Feature Award as well as the Nora Ephron Award and Best Screenplay in an International Narrative Feature. It was selected as the Egyptian entry for the Best International Feature Film at the 98th Academy Awards, but it was not nominated.

== Synopsis ==
Toha, an eight-year-old girl who works as a maid for a wealthy family in Cairo, is determined to organize a perfect birthday party for Nelly, her employer's daughter. However, the social hierarchy between employer and maid forces the girl to face a harsh reality.

== Cast ==
- Nelly Karim as Laila
- Doha Ramadan as Toha
- Hanan Motawie as Nadia
- Sherif Salama as Asser
- Ali Sobhi as Toktok Kidnapper
- Hanan Youssef as Grandma
- Khadija Ahmed as Nelly
- Jomana Ibrahim as Fatma
- Fares Mohamed as Fathy
- Hazem Ehab as Cake Shop Cashier
- Samir Gohar as Compound Security
- Gehad Hossam as Clothing Store Seller 1
- Yasmeen El Hawary as Clothing Store Seller 2
- Adel Mohamed as Face Paint Kid at Birthday
- Osama Mahmoud as Amusement Park Security
- Karim Indomy as Car Honker
- Enas Radwan as Street Girl

== Release ==
The film had its world premiere on June 5, 2025, at the 24th Tribeca Film Festival, and then screened on October 16, 2025, at the 8th El Gouna Film Festival.

The film had its commercial premiere on October 16, 2025, in Egyptian theaters.

== Reception ==
On review aggregator website Rotten Tomatoes, the film holds an approval rating of 100% based on 16 reviews, with an average rating of 8.7/10.

== Accolades ==
Award	Ceremony date	Category	Recipient(s)	Result	Ref.
Tribeca Film Festival	12 June 2025	Best International Narrative Feature	Happy Birthday	Won	
Tribeca Film Festival	12 June 2025	Best Screenplay in an International Narrative Feature	Mohamed Diab & Sarah Goher	Won	
Tribeca Film Festival	12 June 2025	Nora Ephron Award	Happy Birthday	Won	
Palm Springs International Film Festival	11 January 2026	FIPRESCI Prize for Best International First Feature	Happy Birthday - Sarah Goher	Won	

== See also ==
- List of submissions to the 98th Academy Awards for Best International Feature Film
- List of Egyptian submissions for the Academy Award for Best International Feature Film
