= Salah El-Saadany =

Egyptian actor (1943–2024)

- صلاح السعدني
- Born: October 23, 1943; Kingdom of Egypt
- Died: April 19, 2024 (aged 80); Cairo, Egypt
- Occupation: Actor
- Years active: 1964–2013
- Children: Ahmed El Saadany
- Relatives: Mahmud Sadani (brother)

Salah El-Saadany (October 23, 1943 – April 19, 2024) was an Egyptian actor. He starred in or directed over 35 plays, 45 television series, and 70 films throughout his career.

He studied agricultural engineering and obtained a bachelor’s degree from the faculty of agriculture, Cairo University. Among his classmates were the actor Adel Emam and the former Prime Minister of Syria, Mahmoud Al-Zoubi.

Salah El-Din bin Othman Al-Saadani was born in Kafr Al-Qarinin in the Menoufia Governorate in Egypt, on October 23, 1943 AD. He studied agricultural engineering and obtained a bachelor's degree from the Faculty of Agriculture at Cairo University. Among his classmates were the artist Adel Emam and the former Prime Minister of Syria, Mahmoud Al-Zoubi.

== Personal life ==
His older brother is writer and journalist Mahmud Sadani. His son is actor Ahmed El Saadany.

== Filmography ==
=== Film ===
- The Land (1969)
- Oghnia Ala Al-Mamar (1972)
- The Bullet is Still in My Pocket (1974)
- The Sixth Day (1986)

=== Television ===
- Khan El-Khalili (1976)
- Le piège (1982)
- Al Helmeya Nights (1987–1995)
- Arabesque (1994)
- Al Qaserat (2013)
