= Khaled Al Kammar =

Egyptian film and TV composer (born 1990)

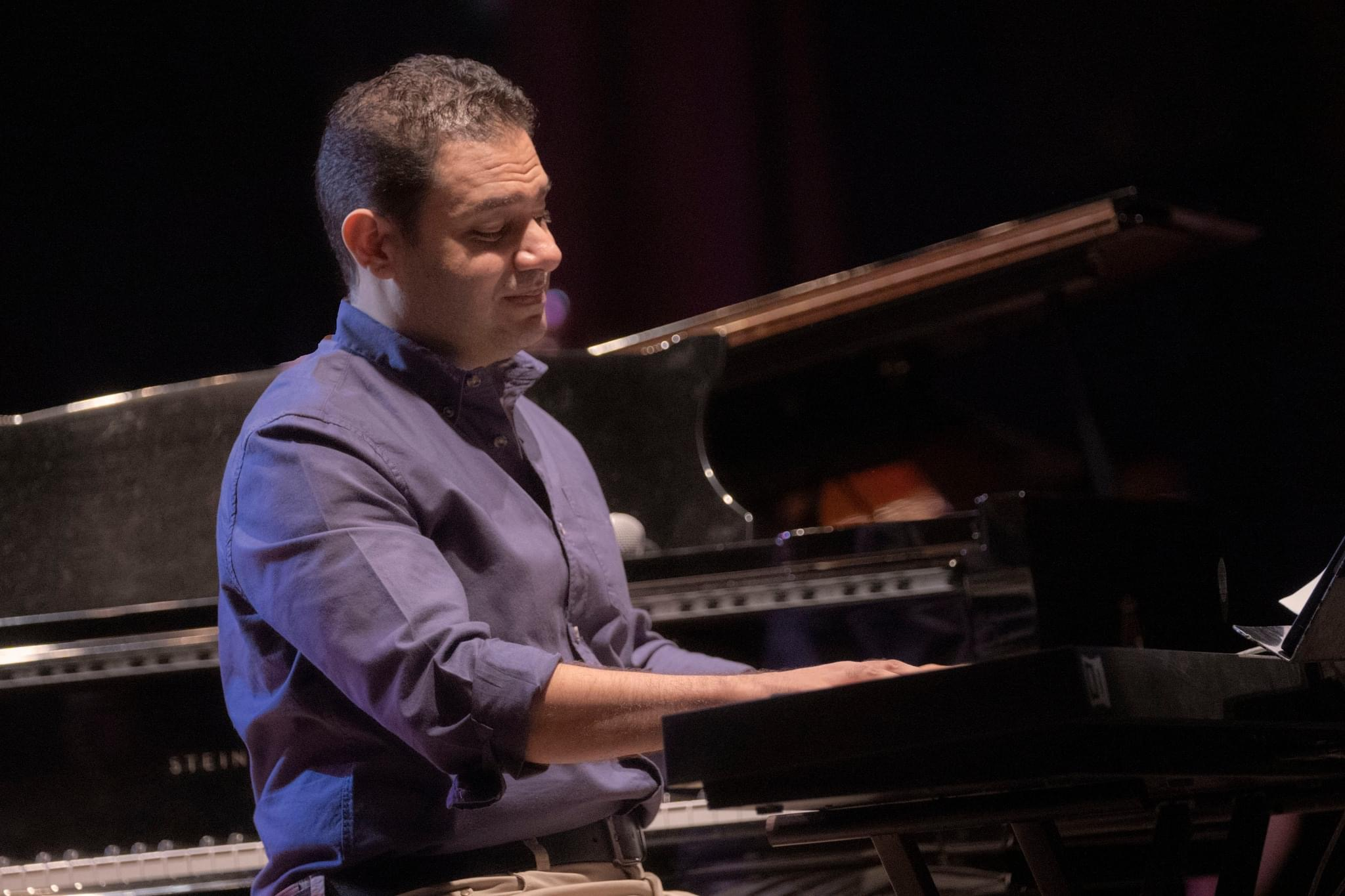

Background information
- Born: 14 May 1990 (age 35)
- Origin: Egypt
- Occupation: Composer
- Years active: 2012–present

Khaled Al Kammar (born May 14, 1990) is an Egyptian composer noted for his scores for film and TV. He is considered one of the most prominent composers of his generation in Egypt, having won several local and international awards for his work on projects such as Qabeel, Sahib El Maqam, and Netflix's first Egyptian production, the series Paranormal.

== Early life ==
Khaled showed a significant interest in music from a young age, despite being raised in an academic family with no artistic background. He taught himself the basics of music and studied mechatronics engineering at the German University in Cairo to satisfy his family's wishes. After graduating, he began his career in film scoring, working at Hany Adel's studio from 2012 to 2015. During this period, he composed music for films like Assem and Décor, among others. He also gained experience by assisting leading Egyptian composers such as Hesham Nazih on The Originals and Layali Eugenie, as well as Khaled Hammad on Awalem Khafeya.

== Education ==
In 2015, Khaled received a scholarship to pursue a Master's degree in Composition for the Screen at the University of Edinburgh in the United Kingdom. He graduated with distinction in 2016, ranking at the top of his class. In 2018, he received the African Excellence Scholarship to continue his studies in the UK.

== Filmography ==
His work has covered Film, TV, and theatre. This as a partial filmography.

=== Film ===
Year	Title	Role	Notes
2012	Asham	Composer	
2014	Décor	Composer	
2020	The Thief of Baghdad	Composer	
2020	Sahib El Maqam	Composer	
2021	Mousa	Composer	
2022	For Zeko	Composer	
2022	Shalaby	Composer	
2022	Valley Road	Composer	
2024	Maqsoom	Composer	

=== Television ===
Year	Title	Role	Notes
2019	Qabeel	Composer	
2020	Paranormal	Composer	
2021	Take Care of Zizi	Composer	
2021–2023	Family Matter	Composer	
2022	Faten Amal Harby	Composer	
2022	Finding Ola	Composer	
2022	The Choice	Composer	
2022–2024	Om El Donya	Composer	
2024	The Last Round	Composer	

=== Awards ===
Year	Award	Category	Work	Notes
2019	Hollywood Music in Media Awards	Best Main Title – TV Show (Foreign Language)	Qabeel	
2021	Hollywood Music in Media Awards	Best Main Title – TV Show (Foreign Language)	Take Care of Zizi	Nominated
2021	State Encouragement Award in Arts	Arts	N/A	
