= Hamdy Ahmed =

Hamdy Ahmed Mohamed Khalifa
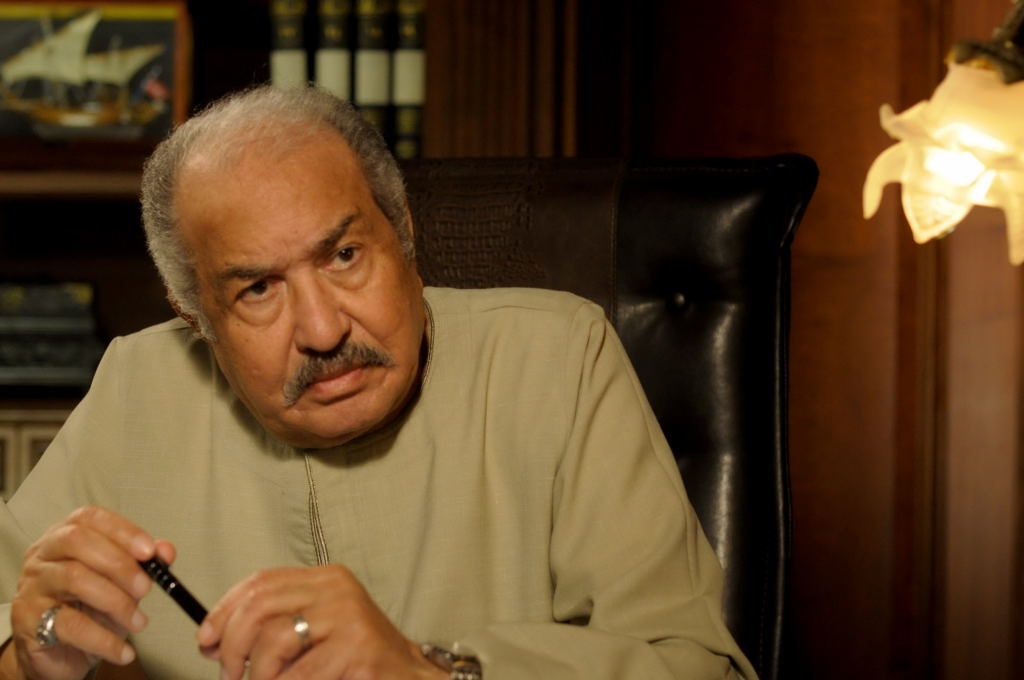
- Born: 9 November 1933; Sohag, Egypt
- Died: 8 January 2016 (aged 82)
- Occupation: Actor
- Years active: 1961–2016

Hamdy Ahmed Mohamed Khalifa (Arabic: حمدى أحمد محمد خليفة; 9 November 1933, Sohag, Egypt – 8 January 2016) was an Egyptian actor. He is known for his role as Mahjoub Abdel Dayem in the film Cairo 30 (1966). Ahmed was a parliamentary representative for the district of Bulaq at the time of the forcible relocation of the population of that quarter to public housing in the az-Zawiya al-Hamra district in the periphery of Cairo. He was a member of the Labour Party of Egypt, but left it in 1984. Ahmed was also a columnist for the newspaper Elosboa (الأسبوع).

== Filmography ==
Year	Title	Role	Notes
1966	Al-Kahira 30 (القاهرة 30, "Cairo 30")	Mahjoub Abdel Dayem	
1969	Al-Ard (الأرض, "The Land")	Mohammad Effendi	
1972	Al-Asfour (العصفور, "The Sparrow")		
1986	Al-Yawm al-Sadis (اليوم السادس, "The Sixth Day")	Saïd	Released in France as Le Sixième Jour
