= Cyrine Abdelnour =

Lebanese singer, actress, and model (born 1977)

- سيرين عبد النور
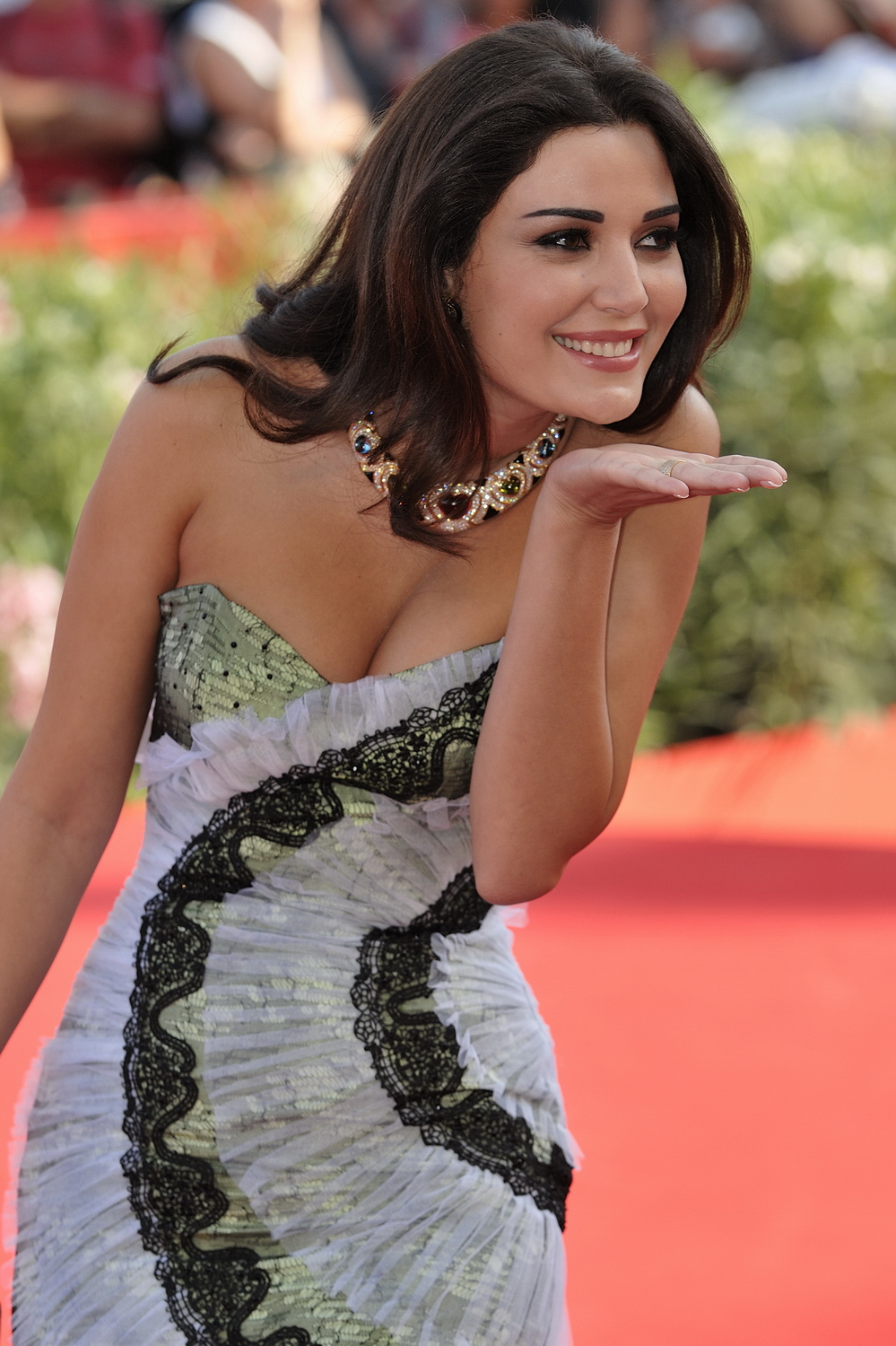
- Abdelnour at the 2009 Venice Film Festival
- Born: 21 February 1977 (age 49); Abadiyeh, Lebanon
- Occupations: Singer, actress, model
- Years active: 1992–present
- Height: 173 cm (5 ft 8 in)
- Spouse: Farid Rahme (m. 2007)
- Children: 2
- Musical career
- Genre: Arabic music
- Labels: Rotana Records; Stallions Records

Cyrine Abdelnour (Arabic: سيرين عبد النور; born 21 February 1977) is a Lebanese singer, actress, and model.

Her first album, Leila Min Layali, was released in 2004. She released her second album, Aleik Ayouni in 2006, with the lead single "Law Bas Fe Aini" becoming one of the most popular songs of that year. Abdelnour has also starred in Arabic TV series and films since the late 1990s and has been awarded four Murex D'or awards for Best Actress.

== Early life ==
Abdelnour was born in Abadiyeh to a Lebanese tailor father named Elias, and a nurse mother of Greek-Lebanese descent named Sylvie Cattouf who is also a follower of the Greek Orthodox faith. She initially studied accounting until 1993, but she wanted to pursue a modeling career.

== Career ==
In 1992, Abdelnour started her modeling career and modeled for the fashion designers Feliciana Rossi, Zuhair Murad, Abed Mahfouz, Renato Balestra, Mireille Dagher, and Thierry Mugler. In 1994, she was featured in George Wassouf's music video "Kalam El Nass".

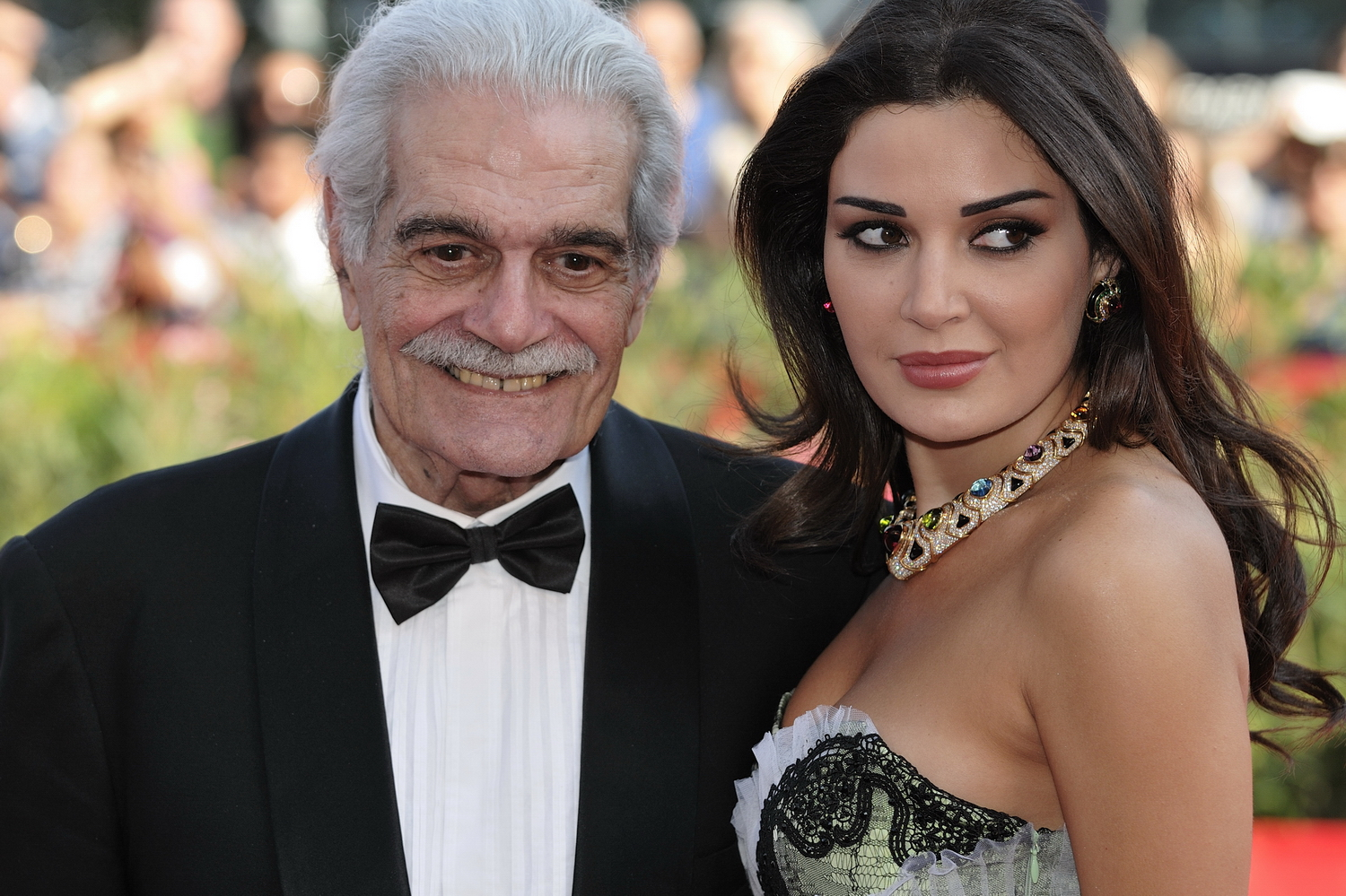
Omar Sharif and Cyrine Abdelnour at the Venice Film Festival (2009)

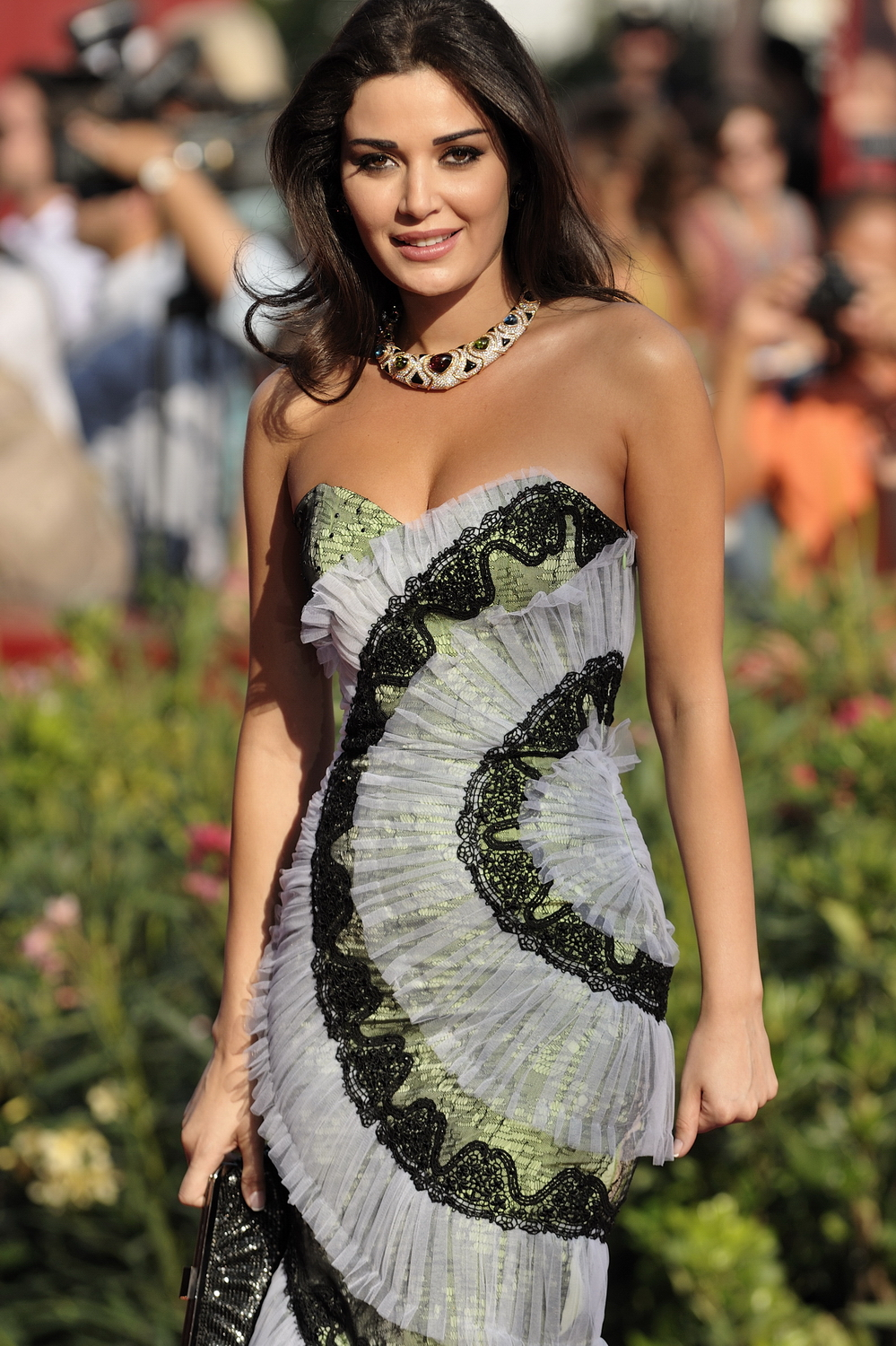
Abdelnour at the Venice Film Festival (2009)

In 1998, she had her first roles with the Lebanese Broadcasting Corporation, with Smaa Kchaa (1998) and Sahat Sahteen (1999) being her first roles of note. In 2002, Abdelnour was awarded the title "Model of the World" at the Regency Palace Hotel in Beirut. In 2003, she starred in the Arabic serials Dareb Khwet and "Ebnati", the latter winning her the 2003 Murex d'Or award for "Best Lebanese Actress". She took on another leading role in the series Mariana in 1998. In 2004, she starred in the serial Ghariba, and in 2007, in the LBC series The Prisoner. In 2009–2010, she starred in Sarah, another series on MTV Lebanon.

In 2008, she starred in the Egyptian film Ramadan Mabrouk Abul-Alamein Hamouda and the Lebanese-Egyptian film Smoke Without Fire, and the following year she appeared in the Egyptian TV series Al Adham and the film Al Mosafer (The Traveller) with Omar Sharif, which was shown at the 66th Venice Film Festival. In 2012, Cyrine starred in the Lebanese series Ruby, and in 2013, she starred in Lobat El-Mot.

As of 2016, she is one of the highest paid actresses in Lebanon. In 2019, Cyrine starred in "Al-Hayba - The Harvest" (Arabic: الهيبة الحصاد) with the Syrian actor Taim Hassan and the TV series was a huge success. She then starred with Lebanese actor Adel Karam in a 15-episode TV series named "Dor El Omor."" (Arabic: دور العمر)

== Personal life ==
Abdelnour is married to Lebanese businessman Farid Rahme. In 2011, she gave birth to their first child, a daughter named Taliya. Abdelnour is a practicing Christian. In 2015, after being attacked by many cyber trolls for celebrating Easter of that year, she defended her religious beliefs during an interview with Al Ghad Radio. Cyrine Abdelnour stated to the hosts, "I'm Christian and it's not like I surprised anyone with the news. It's all our fault (artists) for not discussing our religion in public." Her online harassment during Easter marked an event, which saw many other Arab Christians celebrities being harassed by extremists for celebrating Easter openly. In March 2018, she gave birth to her son, Cristiano Rahme.

== Filmography ==
Film
Year	Film	Role	Notes
2008	Ramadan Mabrouk Abul-Alamein Hamouda		
2008	Smoke Without Fire (Beirut open city)		
2009	The Traveller		
2015	Misunderstanding	Lina Fawaz	
Television
Year	Title	Role	Notes
1998	Smaa Kchaa		
1998	Mariana		
1999	Sahha Sahtein Tleteh		
2000	Ghadan Yawmon Akhar		
2003	Ebnati (My Daughter)	Main role as Mona/Lana	Murex d'Or award for best Lebanese actress
2003	Dareb Khwet		
2004	Ghariba	Main role as Carla/Zaina	Murex d'Or award for best Lebanese actress
2007	Sajina	Main role as Samar	
2007	Hawwa Fi Tarikh	Shehrazad	
2009	Al Adham	Nadine	
2010	Sarah	Main role as Sarah	Murex d'Or award for best Lebanese actress
2012	Ruby	Main role as Ruby	Murex d'Or award for best Lebanese actress
2012	Al Sett	Main role as Samar	
2013	Lobat El Mot	Main role as Naya	Starring with Abed Fahd
2015	24 Carat	Main role As Mira	
2016	Cyrine Bila Hdood		
2017	Qanadil Al 'Ochaq	Main role as Eve	Starring with Mahmoud Nasr
2018	Haddoutet Hob	Main role as Naya	First 5 episodes
2019	Al Hayba	Main role as Noor Rahme	Third season
2019	El Diva	Main role as Rima	
2020	Dentelle	Main role as Mirna	
2021	Dor El Omor	Main role as Shams	15 episodes long
2022	El Ein Bel Ein	Main role as Noura	Starring with Ramy Ayach

== Videography ==
- Leila Min El Layli (2004)
- Sidfi Ana (2004)
- Erga'a Tani (2005)
- Law Bas Fi Eini (2006)
- Aalik Ayouni (2007)
- Sajeena (2007)
- Bilougha Alarabiya Elfousha (2008)
- Elly Malakishi Fi (2008)
- Omri Ma'ak (2009)
- Sarah (2010)
- Ruby (2012)
- Habaybi (2013)
- Aadi (2015)
- Bhebak Ya Mhazab (2016)
- Eza Beddak Yani (2017)
- Leila (2020)
- Hazhaza (2023)

== Discography ==
- Leila Min El Layali (2004)
- Aalik Ayouni (2006)
- Layali Al Hob (2008)
- Habaybi (2013)
