= Bahary =

Bahary بحري
- Location in Egypt
- Coordinates: 31.194999°N 29.897915°E
- Country: Egypt
- Governorate: Alexandria
- Time zone: UTC+2 (EET)
  - Summer (DST): UTC+3 (EEST)

Bahary (Arabic: بحري) is a neighborhood in Alexandria, Egypt.

== See also ==
- Neighborhoods in Alexandria
