= Isaad Younis =

Egyptian actress, film producer, TV host, script writer and author

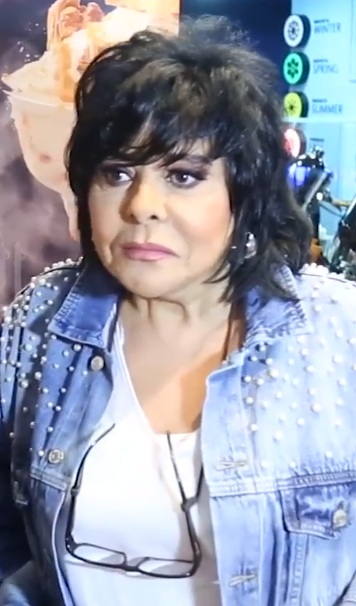
- Essad Youniss, November 2018
- Born: Isaad Hamed Younis Gamaledin إسعاد حامد يونس جمال الدين; April 12, 1950 (age 76); Cairo, Kingdom of Egypt
- Occupations: Actress, film producer, TV host and a script writer and author
- Years active: 1970–present
- Spouse(s): Nabil El Hagrasy (divorced); Alaa El Khawaga
- Children: 2

Isaad Hamed Younis Gamaledin (Arabic: إسعاد حامد يونس جمال الدين; born April 12, 1950) is an Egyptian actress, film producer, TV host and a script writer and author.

== Career ==
Esaad Younes began her career as a radio presenter at Middle East Radio before moving into theatre. She gained widespread recognition for her performance in the play ‘‘Al Dokhool Bel Malabes Al Rasmeya’’, which established her as a successful comedian and led to further appearances in comedy productions such as ‘‘Ya Rab Walad’’. She later built an extensive career in Egyptian film and television, with ‘‘Bakeeza and Zaghloul’’ among her most notable works. She was married to actor Nabil El Hagrasy and later married a businessman, with whom she established her own production company.

=== Acting career ===
Her debut was in the 1972 film "Unfulfilled Crime" starring Salah Zulfikar.

Younes has appeared in numerous television series, films, and theatrical productions. Her notable television credits include ‘‘Bakeeza and Zaghloul’’ (1987), ‘‘El-Ekhteyar 3’’ (2022), ‘‘Kamell El-Adad +1’’ (2024), and ‘‘Tita Zouzou’’ (2024). Her film appearances include ‘‘The Yacoubian Building’’ (2006), ‘‘Alzheimer’’ (2010), ‘‘200 Pounds’’ (2021), and ‘‘Azeema’s Gang’’ (2024). Among her notable stage performances are ‘‘An Appointment with the Minister’’ (1986), ‘‘Half Me… Half You’’ (1988), and ‘‘Pallo’’ (1995).

=== Writing and production ===
In addition to acting, Younes has established herself as a writer and producer, contributing to several successful Egyptian productions. Her writing credits include ‘‘The Crazy One’’ (1985), ‘‘Bakeeza and Zaghloul’’ (1987), and ‘‘The Arrest of Bakeeza and Zaghloul’’ (1988). As a producer, she was involved with films including ‘‘Dearest Friends’’ (2009), ‘‘Alzheimer’’ (2010), and ‘‘Birds of the Nile’’ (2010).

== Awards ==
Younis received the FIAPF Award for Outstanding Achievement in Film for the Asia-Pacific region, presented by the Paris-based Fédération Internationale des Associations de Producteurs de Films (International Federation of Film Producers Associations).

Egypt National Theatre Festival honoured Younis for her five-decade contribution to Egyptian theatre.

== See also ==
- Cinema of Egypt
- Lists of Egyptian films
