= Mohamed Amin (Egyptian film director) =

Egyptian film director

- Born: August 1, 1961 (age 64)
- Occupation: Film director

Mohamed Amin (born August 1, 1961) is an Egyptian film director.

== Life ==
Amin's first film, Educational Film (2001), dealt with the theme of sexual repression in Egyptian society: three sexually frustrated friends embark on a picaresque adventure, their group growing in size as they attempt to watch a porn video. The Night Baghdad Fell (2006) is an anti-American political fantasy, focusing on the reaction of an upper-middle-class family in Cairo to the Iraq invasion. Two Girls from Egypt (2010) depicts two single women in their early thirties, examining themes of spinsterhood, sexual experience, unemployment and political corruption. The film was banned in Kuwait.

== Filmography ==
- 2000: Film Thaqafi (Cultural Film)
- 2006: Laylat Soqoot Baghdad [The Night Baghdad Fell]
- 2010: Bentein Men Masr [Two Girls from Egypt]
- 2013: Febrayer Al-Eswed [The Black February]
- 2021: El Mahkama [The Trial]
- 2021: 200 Pounds
