= Osama Anwar Okasha =

Egyptian journalist and screenwriter

- Born: 27 July 1941; Kafr el-Sheikh
- Citizenship: Egypt
- Occupation(s): Journalist, Screenwriter, Writer, Novelist, Short story writer, Playwright

Osama Anwar Okasha (Arabic: أسامة أنور عكاشة, 27 July 1941 – 28 May 2010) was an Egyptian screenwriter and journalist, who wrote weekly for El-Ahram newspaper. He is famous for writing some of the most popular series on Egyptian television, such as Al Helmeya Nights and El Shahd wel Demou, which are popular in Egypt and all across the Middle East.

His latest work, the series El-Masraweyya ("the Egyptians" or "the Egyptianness") aired in September 2007 and was awarded the Prize for Best Series that year. The series traces the history of the Egyptian people from 1914 until the present day.

Okasha was a former Nasserist who later in life no longer believed in the ideas that Nasser espoused. He has called for the dissolution of the Arab League and for the establishment of a commonwealth of Arabic-speaking countries built on economic cooperation. He was also a strongly secular intellectual who has attacked religious fundamentalism in his society. He was asked to write a television series about the life of Amr Ibn Al-As, as he went back to the history books to draft the script about his life, he declared that Ibn Al-as is "one of the most despicable characters in history" and that "he does not deserve to be glorified in a drama work"

He died on 28 May 2010 after a hard journey with illness.
