= Al Helmeya Nights =

Egyptian television series

- Genre: Drama
- Written by: Osama Anwar Okasha
- Directed by: Ismail Abdel Hafez
- Country of origin: Egypt
- No. of seasons: 6
- No. of episodes: 185

Original release
- Release: October 18, 1987 – 2016

Al Helmeya Nights (Arabic: ليالي الحلمية) is an Egyptian television series, which aired from 1987 to 2016, in six seasons. It was written by Osama Anwar Okasha and directed by Ismail Abdel Hafez. The series depicted modern Egyptian history from the era of King Farouk until the early 21st century in several parts, the last of which was in 2016. A large group of Egyptian artists participated in the series, numbering more than 300 actors.

Sayed Hegab was a songwriter for the series for six episodes.
