= Yacoubian Building (disambiguation) =

Yacoubian Building may refer to:

- The Yacoubian Building, a 2002 novel by Alaa Al Aswany
  - The Yacoubian Building (film), a 2006 Egyptian film based on the novel
  - The Yacoubian Building (TV series), a 2007 Egyptian TV series based on the novel
  - Yacoubian Building (Cairo), a building in Egypt on which the novel is based
- Yacoubian Building (Beirut), a building in Lebanon
