= Yacoubian =

Yacoubian is an Armenian surname. Notable people with the surname include:

- Hagop Yacoubian, proprietor of the Yacoubian Building in Cairo, Egypt
- Paula Yacoubian (born 1976), Lebanese journalist, TV personality, politician and Member of Parliament
- Yacoub Yacoubian, proprietor of the Yacoubian Building in Beirut, Lebanon

== See also ==
- Yacoubian Building (disambiguation)
