= Ali Hassanein =

Ali Hassanein may refer to:

- Ali Hussnein, Libyan politician
- Ali Hassanein (actor), Egyptian actor
