= Those Gentlemen =

- السادة الرجال
- Directed by: Raafat el-Mehi
- Written by: Raafat el-Mehi
- Produced by: Adel al-Mihi
- Starring: Mahmoud Abdel Aziz; Maali Zayed; Hala Fouad; Ibrahim Yusri; Awatef Ramadan; Badr Nofal; Youssef Dawoud
- Cinematography: Wael Saber
- Music by: Mohammed Hilal
- Production company: Heliopolis Films
- Distributed by: Dokki Films and Video
- Release date: July 6, 1987
- Running time: 116 minutes
- Country: Egypt
- Language: Arabic

Those Gentlemen (Arabic: السادة الرجال, transliterated as Al-Sada al-Regal) is an Egyptian film released on July 6, 1987. The film is directed and written by Raafat el-Mehi, and it stars Mahmoud Abdel Aziz and Maali Zayed. The plot involves a woman named Fawzia and her unhappy marriage to her husband Ahmed.

== Cast ==
- Mahmoud Abdel Aziz (Ahmed)
- Ma'ali Zayed (Fawzia)
- Hala Fouad (Samira)
- Ibrahim Yusri (Doctor)
- Awatef Ramadan
- Badr Nofal
- Youssef Dawoud
- Mohamed Hamdi
- Shosho Salamen
- Kamal Suleiman
- Mukhles El-Behairy
- Ryad el-Khouly
- Abdelaziz Issa
- Soraya Ezzedine
- Abdul Hamid Anis
- Rashwan Mustafa
- Mahmoud Ajlo
- Kamal al-Aqer
- Youssef Ragaei
- Sabah Mahmoud
- Abdel-Gawad Metwally

== Synopsis ==
Fawzia (Maali Zayed) is a mature woman of great beauty and is married to journalist Ahmed (Mahmoud Abdel Aziz), a powerful man who sees her in the context of the harem, ergo the arbitrary limits within which women are confined to a domestic role circumscribed by the male patriarch. She rebels against this life to the point of deciding to become a man, confiding her troubles but not her plan to her friend and co-worker Samira (Hala Fouad). When her husband is away on a press junket, Fawzia goes to a hospital and undergoes a sex reassignment surgery. Fawzia then becomes Fawzi, a handsome young man, who surprises Samira on their reunion.

Ahmed returns from his trip to someone even manlier than himself. Try as he might to resist, the judges will not approve a divorce. An educated and enlightened man, Ahmed accepts his wife as an independent man, and Fawzi proceeds to marry Samira. Ahmed, himself fond of Samira, almost faints when he discovers her in her nightgown alongside her new husband.

== Reception ==
Bahraini film critic Hassan Haddad writes on his website, Cinematech Haddad:

Raafat el-Mehi uses a social satirical drama to critique the image and reality of men in society still attached to the old patriarchal view of family…While he el-Mehi burlesques the inequality between the sexes, he also dismisses the woman’s sex change as an inadequate solution given the troubled marriage of Fawzy and Samira in which Ahmed becomes the jilted one as he had jilted Fawzia. The problem is not merely between woman and man but more deeply rooted in the surrounding society. El-Mehi successfully presents this argument through a film both complex in its social commentary and rich in its cinematic visual invention.

According to an article in the e-zine My.Kali:

Screenwriter-director Raafat el-Mehi’s film Those Gentlemen is difficult to classify in any traditional genre…The film does not present itself as a transgender-themed film but rather as a cinematic statement about machismo leaving women no choice but to arm themselves with manhood to save themselves from injustice.

Marwan Shahin writes for the news site Al Bawaba:

The film satirizes the dimensions of gender relations from a social and psychological perspective, critiquing a society of men tied to antiquated notions of the family with barbs aimed everything from the housing crisis and economic stagnation to underpaid doctors and women delaying marriage.

In 1987, Maali Zayed was awarded the Best Actress prize at the Cairo Film Society Festival for her performance in the film. The film was re-screened at a memorial ceremony for her in Minya after her death in 2014.
