= Egyptian Arts Group =

Production and distribution company

ِEgyptian Arts Group
- Company type: Private sector
- Industry: Film
- Founded: 2009 (as a joint venture established between Switch Production and Core Production) (16–17 years)
- Founder: Remon Magar; Mohamed Mahmoud Abdel Aziz
- Headquarters: Cairo, Egypt
- Area served: Middle East, North Africa
- Products: Motion pictures
- Owner: Mohamed Mahmoud Abdel Aziz; Remon Magar

Egyptian Arts Group (Arabic: مجموعة فنون مصر, EAG) is a production and distribution company operating business in the Middle East and North Africa and seeks to go worldwide.

== Establishment ==
Egyptian Arts Group was established with the participation of Core Production and Switch Production. EAG aims to produce TV and film products of high quality. The first production was Bab El Khalk. Bab El Khalk was Mahmoud Abdel Aziz's return after 8 years.

== Founders ==
- Mohamed Mahmoud Abdel Aziz is representative of the company's core of artistic production and chairman of the board of directors of core artistic production. He is a representative of the younger generation demonstrated by many film and television roles. He began working as assistant director and has considerable experience in the field of advertising and organizing concerts in Egypt.
- Remon Magar is a representative of the company headquarters. He is managing director of Switch artistic production and managing director of the company 4P'S and Arab Organization for Industrialization.
- Elhamy Magar is Switch CEO and a partner. He is the family business founder with the support of the three brothers: Elhamy Magar, Shady Magar and Remon Magar who grow the business as Switch and created companies that became well stablished in Arab world media markets.

== Productions ==
| Year | Title | status | Description |
|---|---|---|---|
| 2012 | Bab El Khalk | Broadcast | Bab El Khalk was EAG's first project. It enjoyed success. It also earned many awards including Best TV Production 2013. |
| 2013 | Lessa Hanghany | Broadcast | A night musical TV show were Egyptian folk musicians are interviewed. It's considered the only musical TV show to host and interview Egyptian folk musicians. |
| 2014 | Shaware Al Mahdy | Broadcast | A TV series starring Mohamed Hamaki – it's his debut. The project is part of Egyptian Arts Group efforts to make a new season for Egyptian TV series beside Ramadan season. |
| 2014 | Al Ostaz | Broadcast | Starring Mahmoud Abdel Aziz, 4 years after Mahmoud Abdel Aziz's last film – Ibrahim Labyad (2009). The company has been secretive about the film's storyline and not much details has been officially released except that it will include many intense action sequences. |
