= Yaacoubi =

Yaacoubi is a surname. Notable people with the surname include:

- Souad Yaacoubi, Tunisian politician
- Ala Yaacoubi (born 1988), birth name of Tunisian rapper Weld El 15

== See also ==
- Yaakoubi
- Yacoubian
