= Amal Maher =

Egyptian singer (born 1985)

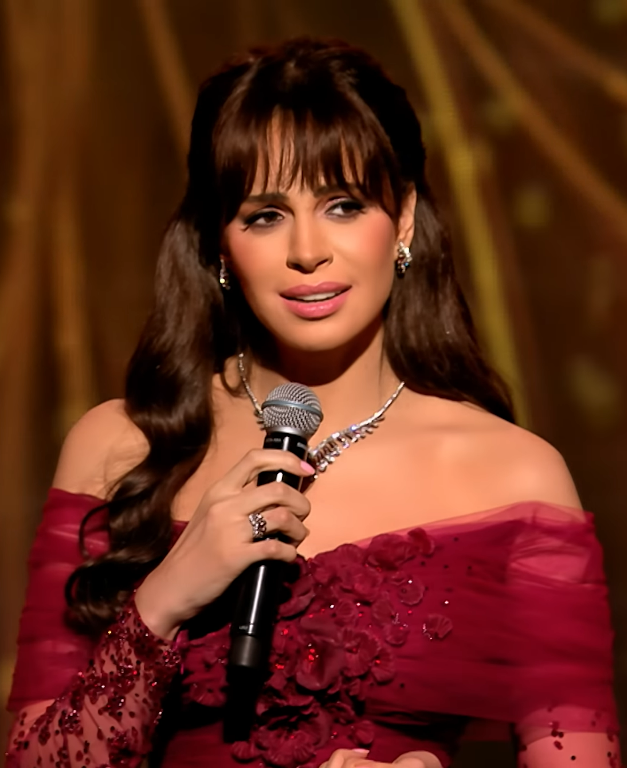
- Born: Amal Maher Mandour Ibrahim آمال ماهر مندور إبراهيم; 19 February 1985 (age 41); Cairo, Egypt
- Occupations: singer; actress
- Years active: 1998–present
- Spouse: Mohamed Diaa (divorced)
- Musical career
- Genres: Arabic music; Khaliji
- Labels: Violin Entertainment; Alam El Phan; Mazzika

Amal Maher (Arabic: آمال ماهر [æʔˈmæːl ˈmæːheɾ]; born 19 February 1985) is an Egyptian singer and actress. She is heavily influenced by Umm Kulthum.

== Career ==
Maher began singing as a child and was discovered by the general public at the age of fifteen by taking up the songs of Umm Kulthum. Deciding to forgo traditional schooling, Maher enrolled at the Conservatory of Arabic music to start a singing career. She soon met the composer Mohamed Diae, whom she eventually married and had a son with. Diae helped Amal Maher release a song and video clip for Ely Binak W Binah. The song was popular on radio and music television. Maher recorded her first song in 2006 and received the support of Ammar El Sherei, who she considers to be her spiritual father because he has been a loyal supporter and mentor throughout her career. In 2004, she released her first album, Isa 'Ini Ana with many singles such as Eini Aliki Ta Tiba, Makanak, Alo El Malayka, Ana El Basha Ghona, Ana Baadak and Ya Marsr.

Maher has held several concerts in Egypt and the neighboring countries. In 2009, she appeared in several festivals in the region. She recorded a second album which is still unreleased. Initially scheduled for 2010, the release date was postponed to the New Year, then to mid-January, and so on and so forth. She released an album called Araf Mnein in 2011, and it won an award for "Best Album by a Female Artist".

In June 2021, she announced her retirement from the music industry, for personal reasons. In September 2023, her five-song album "Ana Kwaiesa" was released, after a two-year career hiatus, and four years after her last album "Asl El Ehsas" in 2019.

== Personal life ==
Maher has one son "Omar" from her first marriage to the composer Mohamed Diaa. She filed for divorce after one year of marriage

In 2018, Amal Mail reportedly filed a police report accusing future minister Turki Al-Sheikh of assault. After receiving threats, she disappeared from public view for over two years, cryptically announcing her retirement from music. No charges were ever brought against Al-Sheikh.

== Discography ==
=== Studio albums ===
- 2006: "Isalni Ana" (Ask Me)
- 2011: "A'raf Mneen" (How Could I Know ?)
- 2015: "Welad El Neharda"
- 2019: "Asl El Ehsas" (The origin of sense) collaboration with A. R. Rahman
- 2023: "Ana Kwaiesa" (I am fine)
- 2025: "Haga Gher" (Something different)

=== Singles ===
- Eini Aliki Ya Tiba! (O Tiba!)
- Makanak
- Alo El Malayka (Angels)
- Ana Baasha El Ghona (I Adore Singing)
- Ana Baadak (After You)
- Ya Masr! (O Egypt!)
- Saken Allayl
- Ana bint
- Arabia ya arth falisteen
- ya masryeen
- Alheera
- nabd alshuara
- Ahterami lel harami
- Zekryatna 2015 Amal Maher & Hany Shaker

=== Sound ===
- 2006: Justified Betrayal
- 2007: The Yacoubian Building (TV series)
- 2013: The Preacher (TV series)
