= Mohamed Emam =

Egyptian artist (born 1984)

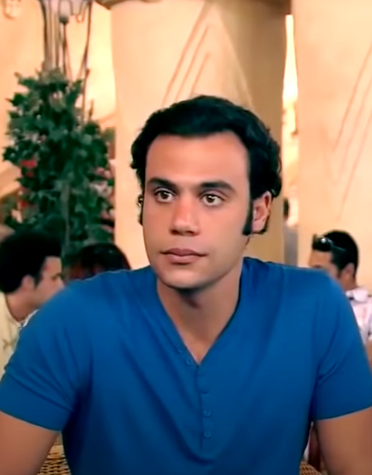
- Born: September 16, 1984 (age 41); Cairo, Egypt
- Occupation: Artist
- Years active: 1990–present
- Spouse: Nouran Tal'at (m. 2018)
- Children: 2
- Parent: Adel Emam
- Relatives: Rami Imam (brother)

Mohamed Emam (Arabic: محمد عادل محمد إمام; born 16 September 1984) is an Egyptian artist. He is descendant of a prominent family of filmmakers; his father is Adel Emam, one of Egypt's most famous actors and his brother is director Ramy Imam.

== Career ==
Mohamed's first role was 1990's Hanafy the Wonderful when he was six years old. He went to Jesuites (CSF) school before he entered the American University in Cairo, studying theatre.

Emam's first major role after university was in the Egyptian series Kanaria and Shorkah as Ashraf Sayed El Ousy (Hany Awaad Abd El Mohsen). Egyptian Director Marwan Hammed selected him to play the role of Taha in The Yacoubian Building (2006), based on the novel of the same name. This was the first of many productions in which Emam acted alongside his father.

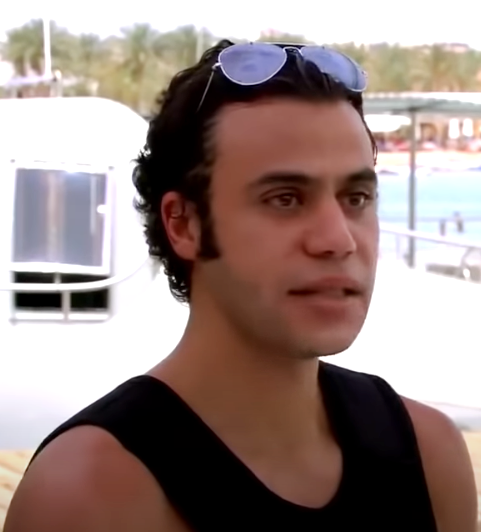
Mohamed Emam

Hassan and Marcus (2008) was his next major film. The movie's plot is about tension between Muslims and Christians. Emam played two characters, the Christian man Girgis Boulus and Emad Hassan, the son of El Sheikh Hassan. Hassan and Marcus was screened at the London Film Festival October 18, 2008. Imam won a prize from the Alexandria International Film Festival in 2008 for his work in the film.

In 2012, he starred as Ibrahim in Ferqit Naji Attalah, a comedy series. The series was a success and received high popularity and was also criticized by Israel. In 2014 he starred in the TV comedy series Saheb Elsaada with Adel Emam, Lebleba, Amina Khalil, Tara Emad, Khaled Zaki, Angy Wegdan and Lotfy Labib and Dalaa Banat with Mai Ezz Eldin. He also had the starring roles in the films Captain Egypt in 2015, Hell in India in 2016 and Lelyt Hana w Sror in 2018.

In 2019 he played a leading role in the Egyptian series Hogan which was one of the most popular tv series in 2019 in the Arab world.
