= Ramy Imam =

Egyptian director, and producer (born 1974)

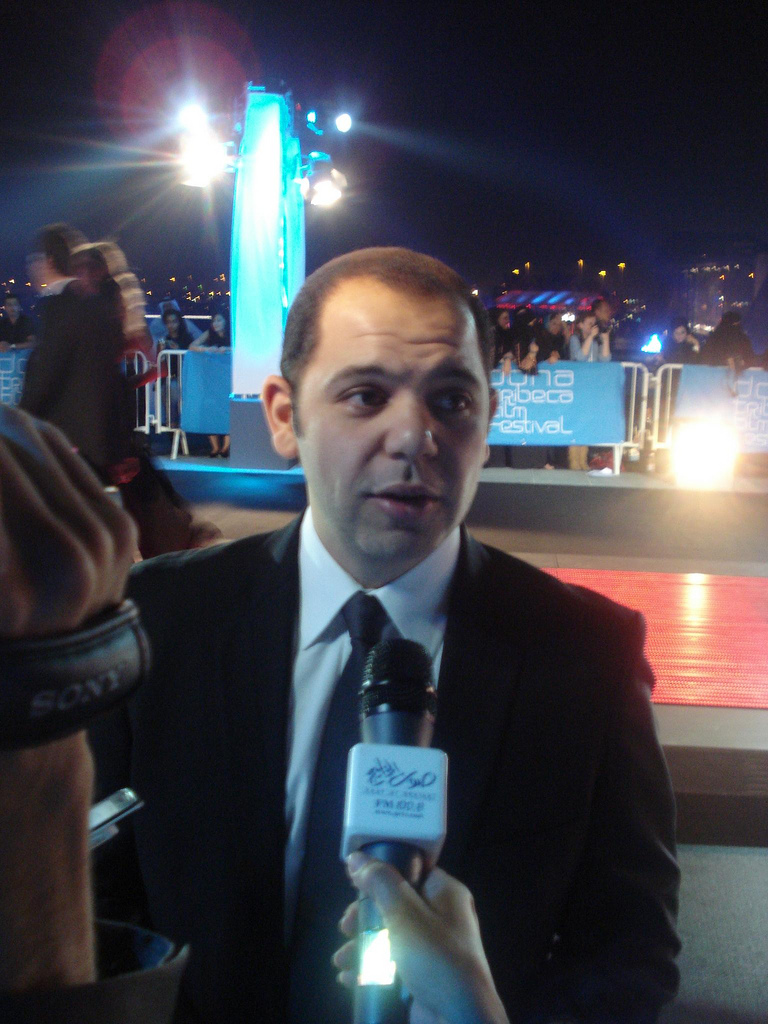
- Born: 25 November 1974 (age 51); Cairo, Egypt
- Other name: Rami Imam
- Education: American University of Cairo
- Occupations: director, actor, and producer
- Notable work: Fast asleep
- Parent: Adel Imam
- Relatives: Mohamed Emam (brother)

Ramy Imam (Arabic: رامي إمام; born 25 November 1974), also known as Rami Imam, is an Egyptian director, and producer.

== Biography ==
Imam was born in Egypt and graduated from the department theater of the American University of Cairo in 1999. He made his acting debut in Fast Asleep.

He later worked as a stage director, later joining his father Adel Emam in the Body Guard game. Then he began directing many films and television series.

In 2016 he established his own production company, Magnum Productions, and produced many television series.

== Filmography ==
=== 1996 ===
- Fast asleep (Arabic: النوم في العسل)

=== Director ===
==== Cinema ====
- Booha
- 1/8 Dastet Ashrar
- A Natural-Born Fool
- Ameer Al-Thalaam
- Hassan and Marcus
- Kalashnikov
- Sun and Moon

==== TV series ====
- Ayza Atgawz (I Want to Marry)
- Firqat Naji Atallah (2012)
- Al Araaf (2013)
- Saheb El Saa'da (2014)
- Mamoun We Shoraka (2015)
- Ostaz We Ra'is Qesm (2016)
- Afaret Adly Allam (2017)
- ..Awalem Khafeya.. (2018)
