= Fish, Milk, Tamarind =

- سمك لبن تمر هندي
- Directed by: Raafat el-Mehi
- Written by: Raafat el-Mehi
- Starring: Mahmoud Abdel Aziz; Maali Zayed; Youssef Dawoud
- Cinematography: Mohsen Nasr
- Edited by: Said Sheikh
- Music by: Mohammed Hilal
- Production company: Heliopolis Films
- Distributed by: Al-Qazzaz Arts Production and Cinematographic Distribution; Dokki Movies and Video
- Release date: November 21, 1988
- Running time: 100 minutes
- Country: Egypt
- Language: Arabic

Fish, Milk, Tamarind (Arabic: سمك لبن تمر هندي, transliterated as Sabak laban tamr hendy) is an Egyptian film released on November 21, 1988. The film was directed and written by Raafat el-Mehi and starred Mahmoud Abdel Aziz and Maali Zayed.

== Cast ==
- Mahmoud Abdel Aziz (Ahmed Sbankh)
- Ma'ali Zayed (Qadara)
- Youssef Dawoud (Malik, an Interpol officer)
- Ashraf Abdel Baqi (police car driver)
- Mukhles el-Behairy
- Majdi Fikri
- Maher Salim
- Aisha Al-Kilani
- Mohamed Dardiri
- Mohamed el-Shewihy
- Ehab el-Saadani
- Rawhia Jamal
- Ahmed Shata
- Hassanein Sorour
- Mohamed Eglo
- Myrna Loy
- Mohamed Desouki
- Abdelmoneim el-Nimr
- Mohamed Abu Hashish
- Mervat Kenawy
- Kamal al-Oqr
- Huda Zaki
- Fawzy el-Sharqawi
- Abdelaziz Issa
- Kamal Suleiman
- Hamdy Youssef
- Adawy Gahaith

== Synopsis ==
In a prologue, star Mahmoud Abdel Aziz warns the viewer not to believe their eyes as the policemen and doctors in the film are purely fictional. Co-starring actress Maali Zayed confirms that “it is all smoke and mirrors.”

The veterinarian Dr. Ahmed (Abdel Aziz) wakes up in the morning to find his sister (Aisha Al-Kilani) complaining about the water being off and his mother (Huda Zaki) looking at the picture of his brother who has traveled abroad for work. Ahmed knows that his mother pays a monthly amount to the father of his fiancée Qadara (Zayed) as a dowry ten years into their relationship. Frustrated with the water shutoff and the monthly obligations, Ahmed rushes to his fiancée’s apartment to attack her father, who owns the building and cut off the utility.

When his father dies after a sojourn working abroad, Ahmed comes with Qadara to retrieve the body for burial. An Interpol officer named Malik (Youssef Dawoud), however, refuses to hand over the body, claiming that the father was a terrorist and insinuating that Ahmed and Qadara are as well.

The film then goes off on an increasingly fantastical tangent. Interpol chases the hero and his fiancée, as does another terrorist group that held the father for ransom abroad.

== Reception ==
Ahmed Shousha, of El Watan News, writes in an article entitled "من "سمك لبن تمر هندي" إلى "تفاحة".. 10 أفلام من إبداع رأفت الميهي" ("From Fish, Milk, Tamarind to A Girl Called Apple: 10 Films of Rafaat el-Mehi") that Al-Mehi was one of the most important screenwriters of his generation and presented the film in a fantasy style.

As Bahraini film critic Hassan Haddad writes on his website Cinematech Haddad:

We are faced [here] with a pioneering work of cinematic fantasy. Rather, it can be described as an artistic exploration of the new and unfamiliar by Raafat el-Mehi. It is, of course, a brave adventure in which the fourth wall is broken and the spectator tired of elaborate productions is addressed directly. El-Mehi bets on the audience’s willingness to accept something new…While El-Mehi succeeds in presenting a series of satirical sketches from the sublime to the ridiculous, he gives his scenes a particular internal logic depending on a thoughtful balance between artistic rebellion and social reality. The fantasy and caricature presented becomes surreal by virtue of a reality stranger than any artistic absurdity.

As the website Kololk puts it,

Fish, Milk, Tamarind is one of the most beautiful and best films of actor Mahmoud Abdel Aziz, director-writer Raafat el-Mehi, and the latter’s assistant Maher al-Sisi. Released in 1988, it is considered one of the films that best express the injustice suffered by the downtrodden [in Egyptian society].

Abdel Rahman Badawi writes in Al-Ahram that “Rafaat el-Mehi is politically audacious in presenting views that stimulate contemplation and controversy alike."

Omar Daoud wrote in the article “Complementary Egyptian Parts: Success or Failure” on the website The New Arab:

El-Mehi created his own eternal world incorporating the characters and destinies of his earlier films, and in Fish, Milk, Tamarind, the hero is the brother of that of his previous film The Advocate (1983)…Fish, Milk, Tamarind is one of the most beautiful films pairing actor Mahmoud Abdel Aziz with director-screenwriter Rafaat el-Mehi.
