= The Kit Kat =

Al-Kit Kat
- Egyptian poster
- الكيت كات
- Directed by: Daoud Abdel Sayed
- Written by: Daoud Abdel Sayed
- Based on: Malek al-Hazin (The Heron) by Ibrahim Aslan
- Produced by: Hussein el Qala
- Starring: Mahmoud Abdel Aziz; Amina Rizk; Sherif Mounir; Aida Reyad; Nagah El-Mogui; Ali Hassanein; Ahmed Kamal
- Cinematography: Mohsen Ahmed
- Edited by: Adel Monir
- Music by: Rageh Dawoud; Sayed Mekawy; Ibrahim Rajab
- Production companies: Egyptian General Company for International Film Production; Studio Misr al-Alamia pour la Télévision et le Cinéma
- Release date: September 9, 1991
- Running time: 128 minutes
- Country: Egypt
- Language: Egyptian Arabic

The Kit Kat (Arabic: الكيت كات, romanized: al-kīt kāt) is a 1991 Egyptian comedy that revolves around Sheikh Hosni, played by Mahmoud Abdel Aziz, a blind man living in the Al-Kit Kat neighborhood in Giza, Egypt. Sheikh Hosni lives with his mother and son and spends his days dreaming of riding a motorcycle and smoking Hashish. He does this to cope with his life as a blind man and the loss of his wife.

== Director ==
The movie is written and directed by Daoud Abdel Sayed, Egyptian Film director and screenwriter. He won several awards for his work in film. He won best director for Al-Kit Kat at the Biennale Des Cinemas Arabes in Paris, France and also at the Damascus Film Festival in Syria in the year 1992. He graduated in 1967 from the Higher Film Institute in Cairo, Egypt and went on to work as a director and assistant in many critically acclaimed Arabic films. Al-Kit Kat is unlike any other Arab film; it showcases the despair and struggles of the characters under the guise of comedy and laughter.

== Plot ==
Sheikh Hosni, the film's main character and protagonist, lives with his son Youssef and his old mother following his wife's death. His son dreams of leaving Egypt to find work in Europe – and he plans to achieve this by convincing his father to sell the house – and he has an affair with a recently divorced woman named Fatima, who also lives in the Kit Kat neighborhood. Sheikh Hosni refuses to accept his blindness as a setback, and dreams of riding a motorcycle one day like any person would. To his son's dismay, he had already sold the house to a drug dealer. He spends most of his nights trying to forget his miserable reality with other residents of the Kit Kat neighborhood smoking hashish. He knows all the gossip of the neighborhood and its residents’ secrets. Ultimately, Sheikh Hosni is shown to be riding a Vespa in a crowded neighborhood.

== Cast ==
- Mahmoud Abdel Aziz as Sheikh Hosny
- Sherif Mounir as Youssef
- Aida Reyad as Fatima
- Nagah El-Mogui as El-Haram
- Amina Rizk as Sheikh Hosny's mother
- Ali Hassanein as Sheikh Obaid
- Galeela Mahmood as Fatheya
- Jihan Nasr as Rawayeh
