= Yaakoubi =

Yaakoubi is a surname. Notable people with the surname include:

- Kais Yâakoubi (born 1966), Tunisian footballer and manager

== See also ==
- Redouan El Yaakoubi (born 1996), Dutch footballer
- Yaacoubi
