= Ibrahim Yusri =

Egyptian actor (1950–2015)

- Born: April 20, 1950; Cairo, Egypt
- Died: April 20, 2015 (aged 65); Giza, Egypt
- Education: Higher Institute for Dramatic Arts
- Occupation: Actor

Ibrahim Yusri (April 20, 1950 – April 20, 2015) was an Egyptian actor. He graduated from the Higher Institute for Dramatic Arts in 1975.

== Death ==
Yusri died on his 65th birthday on April 20, 2015, in Giza.

== Filmography ==
- Those Gentlemen (1987)
- The Terrorist (1994)
- Miss Hekmat's Conscience
- The Witness and the Tears
