= Karim Mahmoud Abdel Aziz =

Egyptian actor (born 1985)

- كريم محمود عبد العزيز
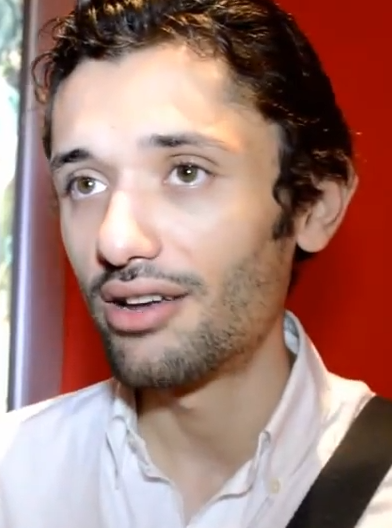
- Born: June 15, 1985 (age 41); Cairo, Egypt
- Occupation: Actor
- Years active: 1995–present
- Children: 3
- Father: Mahmoud Abdel Aziz
- Relatives: Mohamed Mahmoud Abdel Aziz (brother)

Karim Mahmoud Abdel Aziz (Arabic: كريم محمود عبد العزيز; born 1985) is an Egyptian actor.

He is the son of Mahmoud Abdel Aziz and the brother of Mohamed Mahmoud Abdel Aziz, who are both Egyptian actors.

== Career ==
Karim started his career in cinema without assistance from anyone, even his father who objected to his son's way of doing things. But Karim's performance in the television series "Ragil Min Zaman El Alouma" (Man from the Age of Globalization) made Karim's father acknowledge his son as an actor. Karim participated in a number of films and television series, including "El Nazzer" (The Observer) in 2000, the series "Mahmoud El Masry" (Mahmoud the Egyptian) in 2004, and "Ahzan Mariam" (Mary’s Sorrows) in year 2006.

In 2012, he was cast in the comedy film Hasal Kheir alongside Saad El Soghayar, Qamar, and Mohamed Ramadan.

In 2019, he was cast in the series Hogan alongside Mohamed Imam who was the leading role in the series. The television series gained tremendous success and popularity.

Over the years, he has won the admiration of the masses in Egypt and the wider Arab world. He took part in a number of films, including “El Ans W El Nams,” “Bahr El Nujoom,” “Sa3a W Nos,” “It’s Fine,” “Hatuli Ragel,” “Moussa,” and others.

In 2022, he took part in the movies “For Zeko”, Beit el ruby and “Kira & El Gin” as well as the series “El Bayt Bayti.” He also took part in the play “El Bank Saraqooha” as part of Riyadh Season. The film Beit el ruby that Karim was cast in as a co-lead gained tremendous success and got the highest revenue in the history of Egypt cinema.

Karim Mahmoud was fast proving his commercial success after releasing his film Shalaby. It became among the top box office favorites in Egyptian theaters during the holidays.

== Personal life ==
Karim is passionate about sports, particularly football, and also enjoys reading and watching classic films. These interests help inspire his acting and contribute to his creative development, while he strives to maintain a balance between his career and personal interests.

He married in 2011 and has three children.

== Filmography ==
=== Film ===
| Year(s) | Title | Role | Notes | Ref. |
|---|---|---|---|---|
| 1995 | Why Does the Sea Laugh? | Child | | |
| 2000 | El Nims | Child | | |
| 2000 | The Head Master | Student | | |
| 2001 | Shagar el ahlam? | Karim | | |
| 2005 | Gai fel saree | Sayyed | | |
| 2008 | Bahr el nojoom | Child | | |
| 2012 | Hasal Kheir | Fawzi | | |
| 2012 | Bab el chalk | Ghafour | | |
| 2012 | Saa'a wi Nos | Izzat Bahnasi | | |
| 2013 | Ush el bulbul | Bulbul | | |
| 2013 | I need a man | Umar | | |
| 2014 | Gawaza miri | Adam Galal | | |
| 2014 | Omar w Salwa | Omar | | |
| 2012 | Step Outside | Yusuf | | |
| 2021 | Mousa | Yehia | | |
| 2022 | For Zeko | Fathy | | |
| 2012 | Kira W Gin | Old Fahmi Kirah | | |
| 2022 | Bank Robbers | Karim | | |
| 2022 | Shalaby | Saber | | |
| 2023 | El Ruby House | Ihab el Rubi | | |
| 2024 | The Happiness I Have | Ahmad Karim | | |
| 2025 | Project X | Atef | | |
| 2025 | Tallaani | | | |

=== Television ===
| Year(s) | Title | Role | Notes | Ref. |
|---|---|---|---|---|
| 2004 | Mahmoud Al Masri | Mostafa | | |
| 2006 | Ahzan Mariam | Ahmed | | |
| 2010 | Al-Gama'a | Mahmoud | | |
| 2012 | 9 Gameat El Dowal | Shereif | | |
| 2019 | Gabal el halal | Hakam | | |
| 2015 | The Nightmare | Abdullah | | |
| 2018 | Quarter kilo of romi cheese | Karim | | |
| 2019 | Hogan | Lofti | | |
| 2019 | Shaqet Faisal | Motaz | | |
| 2020 | The Choice | Mahdi | | |
| 2020 | Essaf Younis | Karim | | |
| 2024 | Khaled Nour and his son Nour Khaled | Khaled | | |
| 2022-2024 | El Beit Beity | Karakiri | | |
| 2025 | The Silk Kingdom | Prince Shams El Din | | |
| 2026 | El Metr Sameer | Samir | | |
