= Ameer Al-Thalaam =

2002 Egyptian film by Rami Imam

Ameer Al-Zalaam
- Theatrical release poster
- Arabic: أمير الظلام
- Directed by: Rami Imam
- Written by: Hamdi Youssef (story); Tamer Abdel Moneim (screenplay and dialogue); Abdel Fattah El-Beltagy (screenplay and dialogue)
- Starring: Adel Emam; Sherine Saif al-Nasr; Youssef Dawoud; Khaled Sarhan
- Music by: Khaled Hammad
- Release date: 22 June 2002
- Country: Egypt

Ameer Al-Zalaam or Ameer Al-Thalaam (Arabic: أمير الظلام, lit. 'Prince of Darkness') is an Egyptian film released on 22 June 2002. It was directed by Ramy Imam and starring Adel Emam, Sherine Saif al-Nasr, and Youssef Dawoud. The movie was distributed by = Al Arabia Cinema Production & Distribution. The Egyptian Air Force provided support for several scenes. Some critics have noted similarities between the film's premise and Scent of a Woman (1992).

The film follows Saeed al-Masry (Adel Emam), a former pilot who lost his sight after the October War and now lives in a residence for the visually impaired. The institution is run with strict, often arbitrary rules, and Saeed clashes with its administrators while trying to regain control over his life. The plot tracks his efforts to secure dignity and independence, and the relationships he forms with people inside and outside the home.

Saeed's life changes when he meets Alia (Sherine Saif al-Nasr), an artist who treats him as a partner rather than a patient. Their relationship develops alongside his disputes with the home's management, and the pair work through practical hurdles while testing how far Saeed can push for autonomy. Alia's presence steadies him, but the film keeps the focus on concrete obstacles and the choices he makes to regain control of his day-to-day life.

== Plot ==
The film centers on Saeed al-Masry (Adel Emam), a pilot who served in the October 1973 war and lost his sight when his aircraft caught fire. He is placed in a residence for the visually impaired run by a strict administrator (Youssef Dawoud). Saeed resists the heavy-handed rules and works to improve daily life inside the home, encouraging fellow residents to think about color, choice, and independence.

Inside the residence, Saeed builds close ties with other residents as they navigate daily routines and minor acts of independence. He later meets Alia (Sherine Saif al-Nasr), a visual artist, at a disco. After they talk, she becomes a regular presence in his life. Their relationship develops alongside his efforts to assert more control within the institution and to support others living there.

An armed group raids the residence, killing several people and looting supplies. The plot then follows reports of a planned attack on a presidential convoy. Saeed returns to the scene, assesses what happened to the residents he knows, and helps foil the operation, bringing the immediate crisis to an end.

== Cast ==
- Adel Emam: Said Al-Masry
- Sherine Saif Al-Nasr: Alia
- Youssef Dawoud: Zulfi
- Tawfiq Abdel Hamid: Hashem (police officer)
- Donia Abdel Aziz: Nada
- Diaa Abdel Khaleq: Azzam
- Khaled Sarhan: Saadoun
- Tamer Abdel Moneim: Ashraf
- Jarir Mansour: Marcus
- Abdullah Saad: Alberto
- Ahmed El-Tohamy: Max
- Alaa Zeinhom: Employee at the house
- Reda Hamed: Ebadah (Al-Tayyar)
- Saeed Saleh: Guest of honor (coach of the opposing team)
- Younis Shalabi: Referee of the bell ball match
- Ragaa Al Geddawy: Guest of honor
- Enas Makki: Guest of honor
- Saeed Abdel Ghani: Guest of honor
- Mahmoud Azab: Match commentator
