= Ashraf Abdel Baqi =

Egyptian actor (born 1963)

- أشرف عبد الباقي
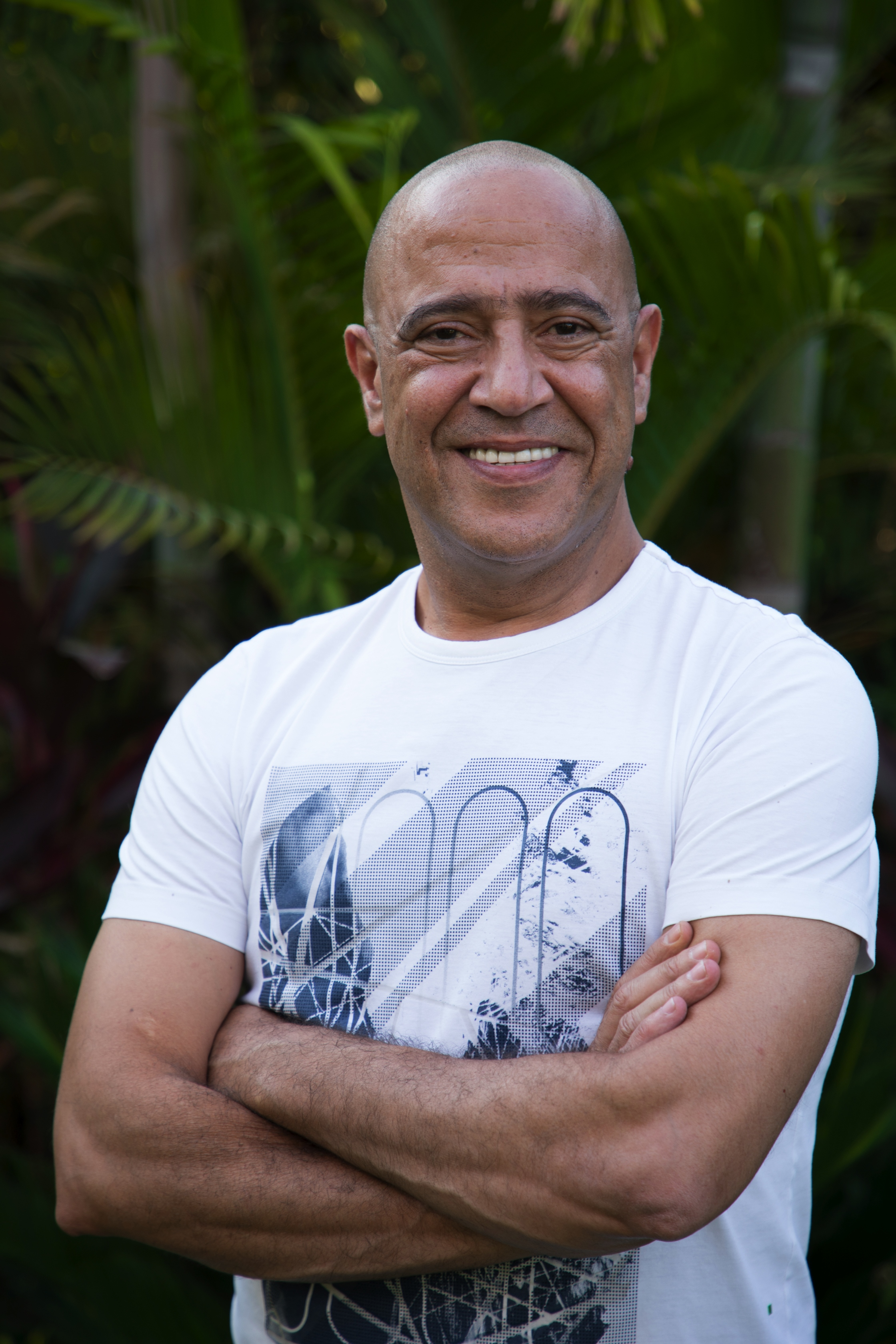
- Born: Ashraf Ahmed Abdel Baqi; 11 September 1963 (age 63); Cairo, Egypt
- Education: Ain Shams University
- Occupations: Actor, comedian
- Years active: 1988–present
- Spouse: Nadya Hassaballa (m. 1994)

Ashraf Ahmed Abdel Baqi (Arabic: أشرف أحمد عبد الباقي; born 1963) is an Egyptian actor.

== Early life ==
Ashraf Abdel Baqi was born in Hada'iq El Qobbah, he was the youngest, having 5 older siblings, three brothers and two sisters. He attended Ahmed Maher Elementary School, and Graduated from Nokrashy High school. At 12 years old Ashraf started working with his father as a contractor, devoting his time during summer and winter breaks to helping in the workshop. He started acting at the age of 16 in high school taking part in over 80 plays, whether front or backstage. During this time his parents disapproved of the idea of acting, his mother especially, as she was afraid of it affecting his education. However, Abdel Baqi's Parents later changed their opinion after he received support from his older brother, who took them to see one of Ashraf's plays. At 18, he opened up his own workshop specializing in Aluminum and different metals. Abdel Baqi then went on to study at Ain Shams University graduating in the class of 86' with a Business Degree. During which he picked up independent studies at the Higher Institute for dramatic arts between 1985 - 1987. There, he met other actors that would become Abdel Baqi's close friends, including Alaa Wali Eddin, Mohamed Henedi, Tarek Lotfy, and Alaa Morsy. He kept his job as a contractor during this time, also opening up a Decor showcase and office with one of his older brothers. Abdel Baqi only closed the workshops after his career as an actor took off.

== Career ==
=== Film ===
Title	Year	Role(s)	Director(s)	Notes
Underwater hell (Arabic: جحيم تحت الماء)	1989	Hareedy	Nader Galal	
Samak Laban Tamr Hindi (Arabic: سمك لبن تمر هندي)	1988	Policeman	Raafat El Mihi	
The Night Bakiza and Zaghlul were arrested (Arabic: ليلة القبض على بكيزة وزغلول)	1988	Policeman	Mohamad Abdel Aziz	
Al Mughtasibun (Arabic: المغتصبون)	1989	Al ghafir Abu Saree	Saeed Marzouk	
Playing With Fire (Arabic: اللعب بالنار)	1989	Taxi Driver	Mohamad Marzouk	
Rich and poor (Arabic: الغنى والفقير)	1989	Borey	Saeed Mostafa	
Sayidati Anesati (Arabic: سيداتي آنساتي)	1989	Samy	Raafat El Mihi	
The Last Game (Arabic: اللعبة الأخيرة)	1990	Fathy	Youssef Sharafaldin	
A Woman Strayed (Arabic: امرأة ضلت الطريق)	1990	Fawzy	Nabawy Aglan	
Geenan Fi Geenan (Arabic: جنان في جنان)	1990	Ragab	Ismail Gamal	
Returning and Regretting (Arabic: العودة والندم)	1990	Farouk	Wael Fahmy AbdelHamid	
Lady of Cairo (Arabic: سيدة القاهرة)	1990	Kamal	Moamen ElSameehi	Cameo
Kill My Wife and Have My Greetings (Arabic: اقتل مراتي و لك تحياتي)	1990	Ibrahim	Hassan Ibrahim	
War in the Land of Egypt (Arabic: المواطن مصري)	1991	Hassan	Salah Abu Seif	Entered into the 17th Moscow International Film Festival
Ya Mhallabiya Ya (Arabic: يا مهلبية يا)	1991	Shably	Sherif Arafa	
Keed Al 3awalem (Arabic: كيد العوالم)	1991	Medhat	Ahmad Sakr	
The Dancer and the Devil (Arabic: الراقصة والشيطان)	1992	Ahmad	Mahmoud Hanafy Galal	
Ice Cream In Gleem (Arabic: آيس كريم في جليم)	1992	Nour	Khairy Beshara	
The Dancer and the Shopkeeper (Arabic: الراقصة والحانوتي)	1992	Presenter	Nagdy Hafez	
Wicked (Arabic: الشرس)	1992	Zein	Nader Galal	
Take Care of Azzouz (Arabic: خلي بالك من عزوز)	1992	Hassan	Nasser Hussain	
Her Majesty's Tears (Arabic: دموع صاحبة الجلالة)	1992	Job Seeker	Atef Salem	Cameo
Desouki Afandi on Vacation (Arabic: دسوقي أفندي في المصيف)	1992	Fathi	Omar Abdel Aziz	
Jaheem Imra'a (Arabic: جحيم امرأة)	1992	Shlata	Tarek Alnahri	
Ay Ay (Arabic: آي آي)	1992	Abu Saree	Saeed Marzouk	
Terrorism and Kebab (Arabic: الإرهاب والكباب)	1992	Hilal	Sherif Arafa	
Pyramid for Rent (Arabic: هرم للإيجار)	1992	Khamees	Maha Eram	
Khadeema Wa Laken (Arabic: خادمة ولكن)	1993	Elevator Man	Aly AbdelKhalek	
Tahqeeq Ma3a Mowatena (Arabic: تحقيق مع مواطنة)	1993	Ahmad	Henry Barakat	
The Bravest People (Arabic: أجدع ناس)	1993	Moneer	Medhat Alsherif	
Gharamiyat Sayes (Arabic: غراميات سايس)	1993	Shoushou Motors/Shahtet el Sayes	Samir Hafez	
Obedience Alarm (Arabic: إنذار بالطاعة)	1993	Aziz	Atef Eltayeb	
The Pasha (Arabic: الباشا)	1993	Tarek the barman	Tarek Al Eryan	
Leeh Ya Banafsag (Arabic: ليه يا بنفسج)	1993	Sayed	Radwan Elkashef	
No to Violence (Arabic: لا يا عنف)	1993	ElBahnasawy	Gamal Altabeey	
Arraya Hamra (Arabic: الرايا حمرا)	1994		Ashraf Fahmy	
The Gambler (Arabic: المقامر)	1994	Zaki	Sherin Kassem	
In Summer the Love is Mad (Arabic: في الصيف الحب جنون)	1995		Omar AbdelAziz	Cameo
A Little Love, A Lot of Violence (Arabic: قليل من الحب كثير من العنف)	1995	Sayed Al Atr	Raafat El Mihi	
Romantica (Arabic: رومانتيكا)	1996	Said Scarface	Zaky AbdelWahab	
Assassination (Arabic: اغتيال)	1996	Adel	Nader Galal	
Meet Ful (Arabic: ميت فل)	1996	Hussain Affandy	Raafat El Mihi	
Jabr Al Khawater (Arabic: جبر الخواطر)	1998	Dr. Mohamed Shaker	Atef Eltayeb	
Ard Ard (Arabic: أرض أرض)	1998	Mohamad Shadeya	Ismail Morad	
Pizza Pizza (Arabic: بيتزا بيتزا)	1998	Mohsen	Mazen Elgabaly	
The Sign (Arabic: اليافطة)	1999	Saad Abdel Wahab	Raed Lebib	
Ashyak Wad Fi Roxy (Arabic: أشيك واد في روكسي)	1999	Hassan Watatak	Adel Adib	
Hassan and Aziza: The issue of state security (Arabic: حسن وعزيزة: قضية أمن دولة)	1999	Hassan	Karim Gamaleddin	
Night Talk (Arabic: كلام الليل)	1999	Abdel Baset (AlBastawy)	Inas El-Degheidy	
Rasha Jareea (Arabic: رشة جريئة)	2001	Salmawy	Saeed Hamed	
Saheb Sahboh (Arabic: صاحب صاحبه)	2002	Gad AbdelMooly	Saeed Hamed	
Love of Girls (Arabic: حب البنات)	2004	Dr. Moheeb ElNashokaty	Khaled El Hagar	
3arees Men Jeeha Amniya (Arabic: عريس من جهة أمنية)	2004	Possible Suiter	Ali Idris	Cameo: uncredited
Ureedu Khal3an (Arabic: أريد خلعاً)	2005	Tarek Alnokrashy	Ahmad Awad	
Cholesterol-free (Arabic: خالي من الكوليسترول)	2005	Ayoub	Mohamad Abu Seif	
Lekhmet Ras (Arabic: لخمة راس)	2006	Nakhnoukh	Ahmad ElBadri	
Ashraf Harami (Arabic: أشرف حرامي)	2008	Alrawy	Fakhr eldin Nagida	
The President's Chef (Arabic: طباخ الريس)	2008	Hassanein	Saeed Hamed	Cameo
3ala Janb Ya Asta (Arabic: على جنب يا أسطى)	2008	Salah	Saeed Hamed	
Bubus (Arabic: بوبوس)	2009	Raafat	Wael Ihsan	
Sayad Al Yamam (Arabic: صياد اليمام)	2009	Ali	Ismail Morad	
Al Ferqa (Arabic: الفرقة)	2013	Raafat		Cameo
Itlaooli Bara (Arabic: إطلعولي بره)	2018	Psychologist	Wael Ihsan	Cameo

=== Television series ===
Title	Year(s)	Role(s)	Director(s)	Notes
Me, You, and Dad in the Meshmesh (Arabic: أنا وانت وبابا في المشمش)	1989	Hassan	Mohamad Fadel	Cameo
The Dream's Lost Time (Arabic: زمن الحلم الضائع)	1992	Fatooh	Wagdy	
Annas Beezat (Arabic: الناس بيزات)	1993	Taxi Driver	Ibrahim AlSabagh	
And Still the Nile Runs (Arabic: وما زال النيل يجري)	1993	AlSahi	Mohamad Kadel	
Wa jari Al Bahth 3an Shahta (Arabic:وجاري البحث عن شحته)	1994	Moselhi		
Assabr Fi Al Malahat (Arabic: الصبر في الملاحات)	1995			
Gulls and Hawks (Arabic: النوارس والصقور)	1996			
Years of Anger (Arabic: سنوات الغضب)	1996			
The Hedgehog (Arabic: القنفد)	1997			
Abou AlFarag's House (Arabic: بيت أبو الفرج)	1998			
Hadret Al Muhtaram (Arabic: حضرة المحترم)	1999	Othman Bayoumi		
Tales of a Modern Husband (Arabic: حكايات زوج معاصر)	2003	Mahmoud		
Mala3eeb Sheeha (Arabic: ملاعيب شيحة)	2004	Sheeha		
Without an Appointment (Arabic: من غير ميعاد)	2005	Ahmad Gaber		
Shakhlool (Arabic: شخلول)	2006	Shakhlool		
Man and Six Women (Arabic: راجل وست ستات )	2006-16	Adel		
Planet of Disorder (Arabic: كوكب كراكيب)	2007	Tiko		Voice Role: Animated Series
7 Al Saada Street (Arabic: شارع السعادة ٧)	2008			
Abu Dhahka Geenan (Arabic: أبو ضحكة جنان)	2009	Ismail Yassin		Biopic on Ismail Yassin
Not a Thousand and One Nights (Arabic: مش ألف ليلة وليلة)	2010	Shahrayar		Spin off of the Arabic Classic 1001 Nights
Humans in the Era of Dragons (Arabic: بني آدمين عصر التنين)	2011			Voice Role: Animated Series
Omena Al Ghula (Arabic:أمنا الغولة)	2011			Cameo
Al Zanaty Mogahed (Arabic: الزناتي مجاهد)	2011			Cameo
Ezz's Grandson (Arabic:حفيد عز)	2012			Incomplete
Nazariyet Al Gauwafa (Arabic: نظرية الجوافة)	2013			Cameo
Me and Dad and Mom (Arabic: أنا وبابا وماما)	2014-15	Mahmoud		
lahfa (Arabic: لهفة)	2015			Cameo
Ramadan Karim's Family (Arabic: عائلة رمضان كريم)	2016	Ramadan Karim		Voice Role: Animated Series
Sad Rad (Arabic:صد رد)	2016			Cameo
Zizo's Family (Arabic: عائلة زيزو)	2017	Abdel Aziz		
Quarter of Roomi (Arabic: ربع رومي)	2018			Cameo

=== Theater performances ===
Title	Year(s)	Role(s)	Director(s)	Notes
Rosewood (Arabic:خشب الورد)	1986-9		Hany Motawea	
No One is Able to Control Them (Arabic: محدش يقدر عليهم)	1988		Shaker AbdelLatif	
Raya and Sekeena's Children (Arabic: ولاد ريا وسكينة)	1990		Hassan AbdelSalam	
Slowly (Arabic: بشويش)	1990		Gelal El Sharkawy	
La Moakhza Ya Moneim (Arabic:لا مؤاخذه يا منعم)	1991		Shaker Khdeir	
Plumber at 12 O'clock (Arabic: سباك الساعة 12)	1991		AbdelGhany Zaky	
Our Father Wants This (Arabic:بابانا عاوز كده)	1992		Mohamad ElSherif Ashraf Zaky	
Game of Love and Heaven (Arabic:لعبة الحب والجنان)	1992		Said Khater	
Al Hanem's Car (Arabic:سيارة الهانم)	1992		AbdelGhany Zaky	
Sahlab (Arabic: سحلب)	1992		Mohamad Nouh	
The Crazy Accident (Arabic:الحادثة المجنونة)	1993		Esam El Said	
Head Ache (Arabic:وجع الدماغ)	1995			
Ballo Ballo (Arabic: باللو باللو)	1995-7		Samir AlAsfouri	
Shaboura (Arabic:شبورة)	1998		Samir AlAsfouri	
Pay My Debts (Arabic:رد قرضي)	1999		Hesham Gomaa	
Sweet and Liar (Arabic:حلو و كذاب)	2000		Mohsen Helmy	
When Dad Sleeps (Arabic:لما بابا ينام)	2002-3		Khaled Galal	
Teatro Masr (Arabic:تياترو مصر)	2013-4	Various Roles	Mohamad Al Sagheir Ashraf Abdel Baky	Creator, Directed Select plays Television Director: Sarah Al Sheikh
Masrah Masr (Arabic: مسرح مصر)	2015-	Various Roles	Nader Salah El Din Ashraf Abdel Baky	Producer Directed Select plays Television Director: Saeed Hamed
Gareema Fel Maadi (Arabic: جريما في المعادي)	2015-	The Inspector	Ashraf Abdel Baky	Was a guest actor as the inspector in select events Producer, Director Egyptian Interpretation of The Play That Goes Wrong

=== Talk Shows ===
Frequent host of Temporary Talk shows

Title	Year(s)	Notes
Lekaa ElAmaleka (Arabic:لقاء العمالقة)	1992	Incomplete
Clapperboard (Arabic:كلاكيت)	1999	
Origin of the Word (Arabic:اصل الكلمة)	2003	
Maklab Dot Com (Arabic:مقلب دوت كوم)	2004-5	
Darak (Arabic:مقلب دوت كوم)	2008	
Geel El Tahady (Arabic:جيل التحدي)	2010	Inspired By The Kids Are All Right
Geem Soal (Arabic:ج سؤال)	2011	
Masr el Beit El Kebeir (Arabic:مصر البيت الكبير)	2013	
Live The Night (Arabic:عيش الليلة)	2017	
Ashraf's Cafe (Arabic:قهوة أشرف)	2018	

== Awards ==
In December 2025, Abdel Baqi was honored by the Egyptian International Festival for Children’s Theatre and Puppetry by having the inaugural edition of the festival named after him. A review of his career was shown at the event’s closing ceremonies where Abdel Baqi helped issue awards.

=== Film Association Festival ===
Year	Nominated Work	Category	Result
1990	"Sayedati Anesaty"	Best Supporting Actor	Won
1999	"Hassan We Azziza"	Best Actor	Won

=== National Cairo Cinema Festival ===
Year	Nominated Work	Category	Result
2004	"Hob El Banat"	Best Actor	Won

=== Catholic Film Festival ===
Year	Nominated Work	Category	Result
1999	"Gabr Al Khawater"	Best Actor	Won
2005	"Hob El Banat"	Best Actor	Won
2006	"Khaly Men Al Cholesterol"	Best Actor	Won

=== Arabic Cinema Festival ===
Year	Nominated Work	Category	Result
2000	"Gabr Al Khawater"	Best Actor	Won

=== Alexandria Film Festival ===
Year	Nominated Work	Category	Result
1994	"Leh Ya Benafseg"	Best Supporting Actor	Won
1997	"Romantica"	Best Actor	Won
