= Magnum Productions =

Egyptian media production company

- Native name: ماجنوم للإنتاج والتوزيع الفني والسينمائي
- Industry: television production
- Founded: 2017; 9 years ago
- Founder: Ramy Imam, Hesham Tahssin
- Headquarters: Egypt
- Website: magnum-productions.com

Magnum Productions (Arabic: ماجنوم للإنتاج والتوزيع الفني والسينمائي) is an Egyptian media production company. Founded in 2017 by directors Ramy Imam and Hisham Tahseen, Magnum has produced several high-profile television series.

== Company projects ==
Magnum signed several high-profile contracts early on with actors such as Adel Imam, Ahmed Ezz, Amr Youssef, Yousra, as well as the writer Ahmed Khaled Tawfik. The company aimed to produce works for both domestic and export consumption. Examples include:

- Imam's first series with the company was the drama Awalem Khafeya, which aired during Ramadan of 2018
- Youssef's debut with the company is the 2019 Ramadan soap Tayea
- Yousra features in a variety talk show entitled الموعد ("Appointment")
- Valentino was released in 2020, another Imam vehicle, this time a comedy
