= The Apartment Belongs to the Wife =

1985 film by Omar Abdel Aziz

- Theatrical release poster
- Arabic: الشقة من حق الزوجة
- Directed by: Omar Abdel Aziz
- Written by: Farag Ismail
- Produced by: Al-Shorouk Art Production Foundation
- Starring: Mahmoud Abdel Aziz; Ma'ali Zayed; George Sidhom; Abdullah Farghali; Naima Al-Sagheer
- Cinematography: Diaa Al-Din Al-Mahdi
- Edited by: Rashida Abdul Salam, Adel Shukry
- Music by: Abdel Azim Halim
- Production company: Al-Shorouk Art Production Foundation
- Release date: 7 January 1985
- Running time: 96 minutes
- Country: Egypt
- Languages: Arabic, Egyptian Arabic

The Apartment Belongs to the Wife (Arabic: الشقة من حق الزوجة, romanized: al-shaqqa min ḥaqq al-zawga) is a 1985 Egyptian comedy-drama film directed by Omar Abdel Aziz and starring Mahmoud Abdel Aziz and Ma'ali Zayed. The film, known for its unique blend of humor and drama, addresses critical societal issues in Egypt, including the socio-economic struggles faced by young couples. It also tackles issues related to marriage, divorce and family dynamics realities. All of them were conveyed in Sameer's struggles with his wife, Karima, and her controlling mother. The movie remains a beloved classic in Egyptian cinema.

It was released on January 7, 1985, and written by Farag Ismail. The movie also features George Sidhom.

The film also presented, in addition, two types of environment and the way of life in them: the urban environment represented by the setting of Samir and Karima, and the rural environment of Abdul Raheem and his wife. Furthermore, the pace of the film was fast, which allowed it to present a vast amount of collective viewpoints. This, in turn, reflects the screenplay's plot and depth, as well as the naturalness of the actors' performances. Moreover, the director's skill in using them contributed significantly to portraying the Egyptian society of that time. Despite its simplicity, the film carried profound and powerful hidden meanings.

The enjoyment, laughter, and sense of kindness mixed with value were, without a doubt, the emotional impact the film left on the viewer. Finally, the film is similar to the French phenomenon of the 'classical play' from 1630. It is a play with a specific course that involves complex dramatic tension; however, overcoming it is possible, ultimately leading to a happy ending.

== Plot ==
Sameer (Mahmoud Abdel Aziz), a government employee, lives in a two-room-and-living-room apartment, sharing it with his friend, Abdul Raheem (George Sidhom), an elementary school teacher who uses the space to tutor groups of children. Miss Karima (Ma'ali Zayed), the daughter of the general inspector Abdel Maqsoud, joins Sameer at work. A bond develops between Sameer and Karima, leading to their agreement to marry. Abdel Maqsoud welcomes the match, knowing Sameer owns a two-room-and-living-room apartment, but Karima's mother, Mrs. Nazly (Naima Al-Sagheer), objects, wanting her daughter to marry a wealthy suitor rather than an employee.

Due to a misunderstanding, Sameer believes Abdel Maqsoud will build his daughter a two-room-and-living-room apartment atop his building, which he often boasts about as his fallback plan in crises. Rushed by this assumption, the marriage is quickly arranged, only for Sameer to discover that the building is co-owned by five families, embroiled in disputes, and mortgaged. To resolve matters, Abdel Maqsoud convinces Abdul Raheem to help Sameer by relinquishing his claim on the apartment. Abdul Raheem moves into a new unit he had reserved with the governorate years ago and returns to his village, where his mother (Hanim Mohamed) arranges his marriage to his cousin Najafa (Farida Seif El-Nasr). Najafa proves supportive of Abdul Raheem's work with the children.

Meanwhile, Sameer marries Karima, but Karima's mother, Nazly, heavily influences her. When Karima gives birth to her first child, Nazly insists on naming the baby after herself, which Sameer opposes. Karima quits her job to care for the baby, impacting the family's income. Sameer buys a taxi on installment payments to work evening shifts, but Nazly and Karima use it for their personal errands. As Sameer spends all day away and returns exhausted, Karima feels neglected and bored. She demands he choose between her and the taxi. Sameer chooses both, as the taxi is for her and their daughter.

Nazly advises Karima to threaten Sameer with divorce, leading Karima to insist on separation. In a moment of anger, Sameer grants her an irrevocable divorce. Despite Abdel Maqsoud's efforts to mediate, Nazly demands a final divorce to claim the apartment under the new law: "The Apartment Belongs to the Wife." The court orders the couple to share the apartment during Karima's waiting period. Nazly makes life unbearable for Sameer by running the washing machine late at night and pounding meat noisily, forcing him to move to a cemetery. Karima regrets her actions, apologizes to Sameer, and promises to ignore her mother's advice. They reconcile and return home with their daughter. Abdel Maqsoud, meanwhile, rushes to occupy Sameer's former cemetery spot, fleeing from Nazly.

== Cast ==
- Mahmoud Abdel Aziz as (Sameer)
- Ma'ali Zayed as (Karima)
- George Sidhom as (Abdul Raheem)
- Abdullah Farghali as (Abdel Maqsoud)
- Naima Al-Sagheer as (Nazly)
- Farida Seif El-Nasr as (Najafa)
- Mohamed Al-Shuwaikhi as (Uncle Maghawry)
- Hanim Mohamed
- Mostafa Tawfik
- Ahmed Radwan
- Ansi Al-Masry
- Osman Abdul Monem

== Production ==
The film was brought to life by a huge crew. The story, screenplay, and dialogue were crafted by Farag Ismail, while Omar Abdel Aziz directed the film, with Ismat serving as the assistant director. Cinematography was handled by Diaa Al-Din Al-Mahdi, with Rashida Abdul Salam managing the editing and Adel Shukry working on the negatives. The sound engineering was overseen by Magdy Kamel, and the production was spearheaded by the Al-Shorouk Art Production Foundation (Arabic: مؤسسة الشروق للإنتاج الفني). The film's makeup artistry was led by Ahmed Afifi, with Abdel Azim Halim composing the score. Visual aesthetics were enhanced by Mohamed Bakr as the photographer, Ghassan Salem as the set designer, and Wagih Al-Sharif handling props. Majed Moussa was responsible for color correction, and casting was directed by Mohamed Khankeh.
