= Chicago (novel) =

2007 novel by Alaa al-Aswany

- Author: Alaa al-Aswany
- Original title: Chicago
- Translator: Farouk Abdel Wahab Mustafa
- Language: Arabic
- Genre: Novel
- Publisher: HarperPerennial
- Publication date: 2007
- Publication place: Egypt
- Media type: Print (Paperback)
- Pages: 356 pp
- ISBN: 9780007286249
- OCLC: 310154424
- Preceded by: Friendly Fire

Chicago (Arabic: شيكاغو Shīkāgū) is a novel by Egyptian author Alaa-Al-Aswany.

Published in Arabic in 2007 and in an English translation in 2007.

The locale of the Novel is University of Illinois at Chicago where the writer did his postgraduate studies. The novel is about the conflict between politics, sex and money.

== Plot summary ==
The novel is about a group of Egyptians who are doing their postgraduate studies in University of Illinois at Chicago, they face many obstacles during their stay in Chicago. The Students are completely controlled by their colleague who is leading the Students' Union Of Egyptians in United States, He is the Secretary General of the Youth Committee of the ruling party in Egypt and he is cooperating with the Egyptian Intelligence Agency to make sure of the loyalty of the students and to transfer information about immigrant Copts.

The Novel shows the racism in Chicago, the conflict between the Arab and Western culture after 9/11 and the corruption in the Egyptian regime.

== Main characters ==
- Shayma' Al-Mohammady – A Rural student from Tanta in Egypt, studying in the department of Histology, she is having a relationship with Tarek Haseeb, who refuses to marry her.
- Dr. Raafat Thabet – Egyptian-American professor in the department of Histology, he loves America and hates the Arab Culture. He faces many problems as his daughter moves out to live with her boyfriend who makes her addicted to drugs.
- Dr. Karam Dos – A Coptic world-famous Egyptian-American surgeon, he immigrated to America because of his professor (Dr. Balbaa) who was racist and refused to grant him master's degree two times because he was Coptic.
- Dr. Mohammed Salah – Egyptian-American professor in the department of Histology, he left his girlfriend Zeinab and immigrated to America in the seventies. After more than 30 years in America, he regrets going there and wishes to go back in time.
- Prof. John Graham – A professor in the University Of Illinois, he is American, he doesn't care about money, he doesn't believe in marriage or religions.
- Prof. George Micheal – A professor in the University Of Illinois, he is a racist American, he hates Arabs and Muslims and is always criticizing them.
- Nagi Abdel Samad – A Master's Student who wasn't appointed in the University in Egypt so he sued the university, he is a poet and opposing the Egyptian regime.
- Ahmed Danana – The President of the Students' Union Of Egyptians in United States, he is the Secretary General of the Youth Committee of the ruling party in Egypt, he cooperates with (General Raafat Shaker) who is the Counselor of the Egyptian Embassy in America.

== Criticism ==
The novel was criticized by many Arab readers due to intensive description of the sexual life of nearly every character.

Also it described the Hijab as reactionary due to the Wahhabi influence on Egypt.
