= Ma'ali Zayed =

Egyptian actress

- معالي زايد
- Born: November 5, 1953; Cairo, Egypt
- Died: November 10, 2014 (aged 61); Cairo
- Occupation: Actress
- Years active: 1977 - 2013
- Notable work: Those Gentlemen; Fish, Milk, Tamarind; The Apartment Belongs to the Wife

Ma'ali Zayed (Arabic: معالي زايد; November 5, 1953 - November 10, 2014) was an Egyptian actress who appeared in over 30 films, as well as numerous theatrical productions and television series in Egypt.

She studied at the College of Art Education and then the Higher Institute of Cinema. Her first artistic appearance on television was in the movie “The Promised Night.” Zayed gained prominence for her roles in the series "Tears in Shameless Eyes" and "Heat Wave," as well as her part in the theatrical production "Extra Sugar." Her career in cinema commenced in 1987 with her debut film "Life is Wasted, My Son." Notably, she rose to fame for her performances in "The Egg and the Stone" and "Those Gentlemen," the latter being a groundbreaking Egyptian film that addressed the subject of gender-affirming surgery (female-to-male) in Arabic societies.

She died on November 10, 2014, following a long battle with the Lung cancer.

== Early life and education ==
Zayed was born on November 5, 1953, on Champollion Street in central Cairo, into a family with a rich tradition in acting, writing scripts, and singing. Her mother, Amal Zayed, and her aunt, Gamalat Zayed, were both esteemed actresses. Zayed pursued her education at the College of Art Education and later attended the Higher Institute of Cinema, where she honed her skills in filmmaking. She graduated from the Faculty of Fine Arts with a focus on painting.

== Early career ==
Born on November 5, 1953, Ma'ali Zayed began her acting career with supporting roles in various movies and television series. Notable among her early works are her roles in the movie "We Daa Al Omr Ya Waladi" (Arabic: ضاع العمر يا ولدي) (1978) and the TV series "Eilet El Doughry" (Arabic: عيلة الدوغري) (1980). However, it was her ability to make bold and instinctive choices that distinguished her from her peers. Zayed soon started carving out her own niche in the film industry, delivering remarkable performances in television series such as "Bein El Quassrein" (Arabic: بين القصرين) (1987) and "Quasr El Shawk" (Arabic: قصر الشوق) (1988), the latter being based on the works of renowned Egyptian author Naguib Mahfouz.

In 1987, she received the prestigious Best Actress Award from the Film Society for her exceptional performance in the movie "Those Gentlemen" (Arabic: السادة الرجال), solidifying her status as a respected figure in Egyptian cinema.

== Personal life ==
Beyond her acting career, Maali Zayed had a passion for drawing portraits and harbored a dream of holding her own art exhibition. During breaks between acting engagements, she devoted time to preparing her paintings.

She maintained a private farm along the Egypt-Alexandria desert road, where she sought solace and relaxation during breaks from her busy schedule. She was at one point married, but the relationship ended in divorce

Ma'ali Zayed was admired for her beauty and warm personality. She decorated her home with paintings and awards, and had a pet dog.

== Selected works ==
=== Movies ===
Year	Film	Name Translation	Role
1978	We Daa Al Omr Ya Waladi	Life is Wasted, My Son	
1980	Darb al-Fananeen	The Artists' Way	
1982	Aroosa wa gooz ersan	Bride and Two Grooms	
1983	Wala min shaf wala min duri	Neither Seen, Nor Known	
1983	El Arbagy	The Wagoner	
1984	Bayt al-Qadi	The Judge's House	Afaf
1984	el-Forn	The Bakery	
1984	el-Armala w al-Shaitan	The Widow and the Devil	
1985	Qadeyet Aam Ahmed	Uncle Ahmed's Case	Fatma
1985	Asal el-Hob el-Mor	Love's Bitter Honey	Yasmine
1985	Ana Ely Katlt El-Hanash	I Killed El-Hanash	
1985	El Shaqa Men Haq El Zogga	The Apartment Belongs to the Wife	
1985	El halal yiksab	Halal Wins	
1985	Estghaset Min Al-Alam El-Akhar	A Cry from Beyond	
1986	Li el-Hob Qesaa Akhira	Love Has A Final Story	Salwa
1986	E'mra'a Mutamareda	A Rebellious Woman	Safaa
1986	Al-Sakakeni	Knives maker	
1987	Shahed Ethbat	Prosecution Witness	Salma
1987	Al-Ta'na	The Stab	
1987	el-Sada el-Afadel	Those Gentlemen	Fawzia
1987	Al-Zawga Ta'arif Akthar	The Wife Knows More	Wafaa
1988	Samak Laban Tamr Hendy	Fish, Milk, Tamarind	Qadara
1989	Katebet al-E'dam	Execution Squad	
1989	Sydaati Anisaati	Ladies and Misses	
1990	Jahim 2	Hell 2	
1990	Al-Khatar	Danger	
1990	Al-Baida Wal-Hajar	The Egg and the Stone	
1991	Al-Sarkha	The Shout	
1992	Doctora Ma' Martabet el-Sharaf	PhD with Honors	
1992	El-Mutahma	The Accused	Layla
1992	El-Zaman El-Sa'ab	Difficult Time	
1993	Lolaaky	If It Weren't For You	Salwa
1995	El-Marakbi	The Ferryman	
1995	Aswar el-Hob	Love's Gates	
1996	Ragol Mohem Giddann	A Very Important Man	
1996	El-Mokalma El-Qatela	The Deadly Call	
1996	Abu El-Dahab	Gold Owner	
2000	Qadr Emra'a	A Woman's Destiny	
2001	Anbar wal Alwan	Anbar and the Colors	
