= Mohamed Mahmoud Abdel Aziz =

Egyptian actor and film producer

Mohamed Abdel Aziz
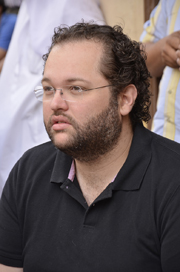
- Born: Mohamed Mahmoud Abdel Aziz; August 14, 1981 (age 44); Cairo, Egypt
- Education: Egyptian Naval Academy
- Occupation(s): Actor, producer
- Father: Mahmoud Abdel Aziz
- Relatives: Karim Mahmoud Abdel Aziz (brother)

Mohamed Mahmoud Abdel Aziz (Arabic: محمد محمود عبد العزيز) commonly known as Mohamed Abdel Aziz (Arabic: محمد عبد العزيز), is an Egyptian producer and actor. He is also the son of the famous actor Mahmoud Abdel Aziz.

== Biography ==
=== Early life ===
Abdel Aziz grew up in an artistic family, his father being Mahmoud Abdel Aziz. His brother, Karim Mahmoud Abdel Aziz, is also an actor.

=== Career ===
Abdel Aziz graduated from the Egyptian Naval Academy in Alexandria with a major in marketing. He started his career by working in the field of advertising for some time, at the Established On Time Company for Advertising and Promotions company, and has produced a large number of important concerts inside and outside of Egypt for many renown singers in the Arab community.

He worked as an assistant director in some movies, before having the opportunity to work on Egyptian blockbusters including The BabyDoll Night. He then turned to acting and landed supporting roles in TV shows like Shabab Ala El Hawa and El Kota El Amia as well as in some movies including Kazalek Fel Zamalek and Yahia El Adl. He received the Readers Poll Award for Best young face in 2010 for his role in the movie Shabalo and the TV series El Kota El Amia. Mohamed then established his own production company, CORE Production, which he used to make a joint venture with a second production company, SWITCH Adv, leading to the creation of the Egyptian Arts Group through which he then realized many of his successful productions.

=== Held Positions ===
- Core Production representative in Egyptian Arts Group
- Chairman of CORE Production Co.
- ONTIME Founder

== Assistant director ==
- The BabyDoll Night

== Actor ==
- El Nems (2000)
- Rehla Mashboha (2001)
- Yahia El Adel (2001)
- Shabab Ala El Hawa (2002)
- Kazalek Fel Zamalek (2002)
- El Kota El Amia (2010)

== Production Work ==
Year	Title	Credit	Description
2010	Baba Zaem Esaba	Producer	Baba Zaem Esaba is a comedy radio series, starring Mahmoud Abdel Aziz and Mervat Amin. "Hussien Abd El Maged" a failed writer, is working on a comedy TV Series thinking it will achieve the success he has always been dreaming of, but as always his plans take a terrible turn.
2012	Bab El Khalk	Producer	Bab El Khalk is considered Mahmoud Abdel Aziz comeback after 8 years of absence since his last successful TV Series Mahmoud Al Masry. It is Egyptian Arts Group’s first project that received acclaim and was successful. It ran for 3 times on many major Egyptian TV Channels including Cairo Centric, CBC, Al Haya TV, Dream TV, Mehwar and Orbit.
2013	Lessa Hanghany	Producer	A Night musical TV Show where Egyptian folk-musicians are interviewed. It is considered the only musical TV show to host and interview Egyptian folk-musicians.
2014	Gabal Al Halal	Producer	Gabal Al Halal scheduled to air during Ramadan 2014. The series is starring Mahmoud Abdel Aziz, written by Naser Abdel Rahman and Directed by Adel Adeeb.

== About Egyptian Arts Group ==
Egyptian Arts Group is a Cairo-based Production Company serving the MENA region. Egyptian Arts Group is a joint venture established between Switch & Core Production; with a combined experience in all media production fields.
