= Yacoubian Building (Cairo) =

Coordinates: 30.051177°N 31.240777°E

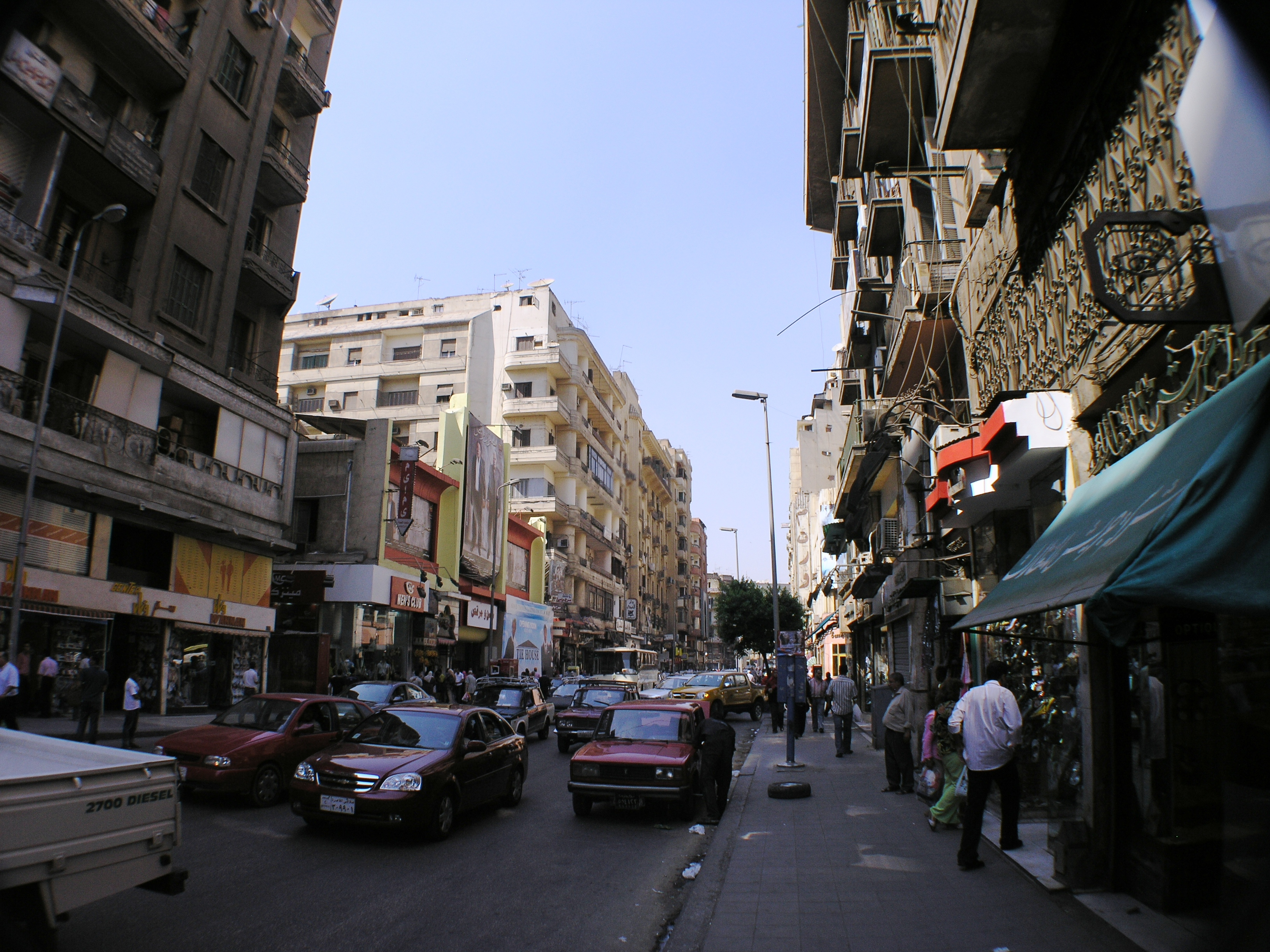
Cairo - Downtown - Talaat Harb Street, the Yacoubian building is on the left

The Yacoubian Building (Arabic: عمارة يعقوبيان, Édifice Yacoubian) is a mixed-use building in Downtown Cairo, Egypt, built in 1937. Located on No. 34 on Talaat Harb Street, Cairo, the Art Deco style edifice was named after its Lebanese-Armenian owner and businessman Hagop Yacoubian. The architect of the building was Garo Balian.

The building served as a residence for Cairo's upper-class during the Kingdom of Egypt, home to cotton millionaires, members of the royal family, and foreign nationals. During and after the 1952 revolution the building was used as a domicile for Egyptian military officers and their wives. By the 1970s the building was transferred to mixed use, including shopfronts and offices.

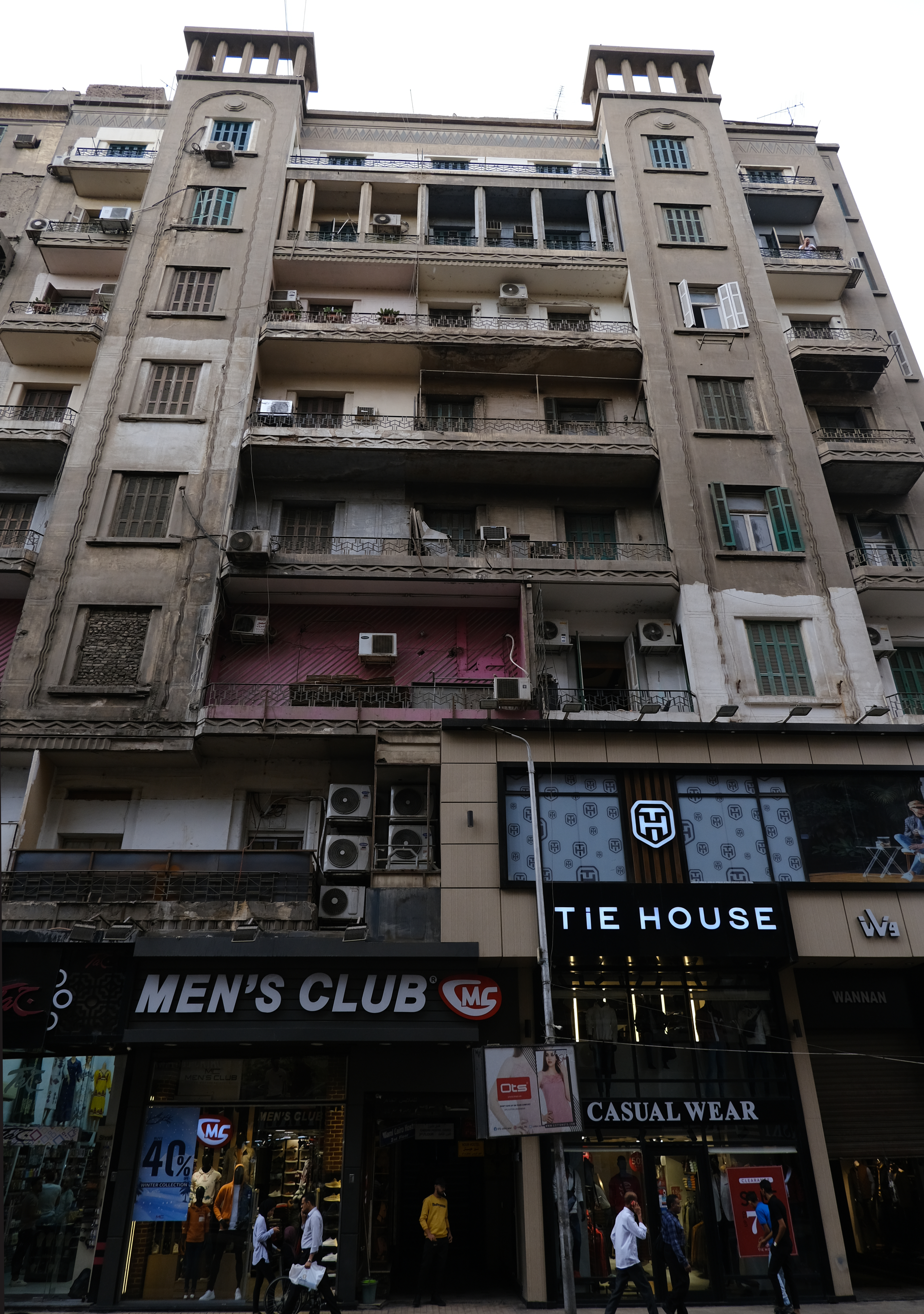
The Yacoubian Building at 24 Talaat Harb St, Cairo, in October 2022.

A fictionalised version of the building serves as a metaphor for Cairo's own deterioration in the 2003 Arabic language novel The Yacoubian Building by Alaa Al Aswany. The novel was adapted into a 2006 film of the same name, directed by Marwan Hamed. A larger building, located on Talaat Harb Square was used for the exteriors.

The Yacoubian Building in Beirut, Lebanon belonged to the same family.
