= Mahmoud Abdel Aziz =

Egyptian actor (1946–2016)

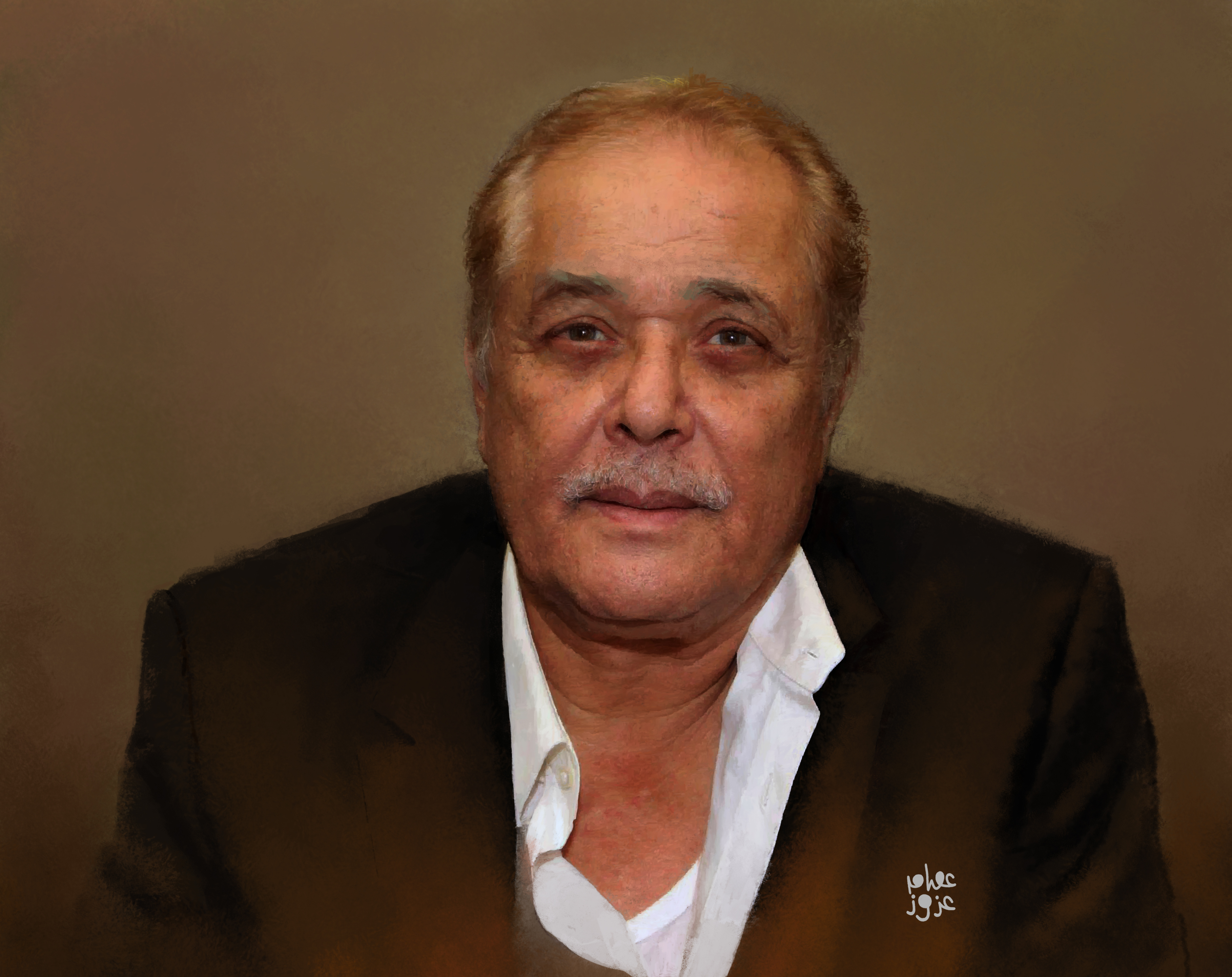
- Born: 4 June 1946; Alexandria, Egypt
- Died: 12 November 2016 (aged 70); Cairo, Egypt
- Education: Alexandria University
- Occupation: Actor
- Spouses: Jelan; Poussy Challabi
- Children: Mohamed Mahmoud Abdel Aziz; Karim Mahmoud Abdel Aziz

Mahmoud Abdel Aziz (Arabic: محمود عبد العزيز; 4 June 1946 – 12 November 2016) was an Egyptian film and television actor. He became famous for several famous roles in Egyptian cinema, before becoming famous in his native Egypt and the whole region for his Egyptian patriotic role in the Egyptian TV series Raafat el-Hagan. The Egyptian Actors Guild announced his death on the night of 12 November 2016.

== Early life ==
Mahmoud Abdel Aziz was born in Wardeyan, a neighborhood in Alexandria, Egypt to a middle-class family. Although he was studying Agricultural Science at Alexandria University, he used to practice his acting through the university theatre.

== Career ==
He started his acting career by appearing in a role in Al Dawama TV miniseries show in 1973 with Nelly and Mahmoud Yacine, followed by the TV miniseries Qaseera Qaseera Al Hayat with Salah Zulfikar and Magda, aired in 1974. Afterwards, he entered the movie industry for the first time through Al Hafeed (1974) an all-time Egyptian film classic. Mahmoud Abdel Aziz starred in over 25 movies during the late 1970s and early 1980s; while his popularity was increasing dramatically, most of which at the time were categorized as romantic dramas.

His acting path matured when he started taking on different roles which really exposed his talent. He was known to be equally adept at comedy and drama. The 1980s marked Mahmoud Abdel Aziz as a superstar when he starred in very successful movies like El Aar (1982) and El Kef (1985), and TV series such as Raafat El-Hagan (1987) which is one of the most popular works of Egyptian television based on the true story of the renowned Egyptian spy Refaat Al-Gammal who was planted in Israel for over 20 years before and after the Six-Day War.

Mahmoud Abdel Aziz had starred in over 100 movies and he manage to still surprise his audience with works such as Bab El Khalk (2012) TV Series after 7 years of absence from the Egyptian television.

== Personal life ==
He was married twice; first to Jelan, with whom he had two children, Mohamed Mahmoud Abdel Aziz, a film producer and director, and Karim Mahmoud Abdel Aziz. After their divorce, he married the Egyptian introducer, Poussy Chalabi.

== Filmography ==
=== Film ===
Year	Film	Translation
1974	Al Hafeed	The Grandson
1975	Hata Akhr El Oomr	Till The End of Life
1975	Yom El Had El Dami	Bloody Sunday
1976	Waghan Le Wagh	Face to Face
1977	Khataya	Sins
1977	Maa Hobi Wa Ashwaki	With Love and Desires
1977	Abnati wal Deeb	My Daughters and The Wolf
1977	Al Shayatin	The Demons
1977	El Bent El Helwa El Kazaba	The Sweet Liar Girl
1977	Taer El Lel El Hazin	Sad Night Bird
1977	Kafani ya Kalb	Enough Heart
1978	Emraa Bela Kalb	A Woman Without A Heart
1978	Emraa Fih Dammi	A Woman in My Blood
1978	Hessab Al Senin	Account of The Years
1978	Shabab Yarkos Fawk Al Nar	Dancing Youth Over The Fire
1978	Shafika we Metwali	Shafika and Metwali
1978	Eeb Ya Loulou	It's a Disgrace Loulou
1978	Keloob Fih Bahr Al Domoo'	Hearts in a Sea of Tears
1978	Wa Daa AL Oomr Ya Waladi	And Time Was Lost Son
1979	Akwa Men Al Ayam	Stronger Than Days
1979	Ooshak That El Eshreen	Lovers Under Twenty
1979	Al Motawahesha	The Wild One
1979	Lah Yazalo El Tahkik Mostameran	A Case Unclosed
1980	Banatne Fi El Khareg	Daughters Abroad
1980	Al Abalessa	The Devils
1980	Aalamat Maanaha Al Khatar	Signs of Danger
1980	El Bent Aeza Eh	What Does The Girl Want
1980	Hob Lah Yara El Shams	Love That Can't Come To Light
1981	Ana Fih Eenayhi	I in His Eyes
1982	Shetan El Gezira	The Devil of The Island
1982	Wadi Al Zekrayat	Valley of The Memories
1982	Wadaa Al Aazab	A Tortured Farewell
1982	Eedam Taleb Sanawy	The Execution of a High School Student
1982	Al Aar	The Shame
1982	Al Maatooh	The Fool
1982	Wekalet El Balah	The Date Agency
1983	El Khobz El Mor	Bitter Bread
1983	Darb El Hawa	Wind Gusts
1983	Al Sada Al Mortashoun	The Corrupt Gentlemen
1983	Al Aazra' Wal Shaar Al Abyad	The Virgin and The White Hair
1983	Mamlakat Al Halwassa	Kingdom of Hallucinations
1983	Nesf Arnab	Half a Rabbit
1983	Argook Eetini Haza Al Dawa	Please Give Me The Cure
1984	Bayt Al Kasserat	Minors House
1984	Tazwir Fih Awraa Rasmeya	Official Counterfeit
1984	Fokaraa Lah Yatkholoona Al Gana	No Heaven for the Poor
1984	Lik Yom Ya Beh	There Will Be A Day Sir
1984	Wa Laken Shay'on Mayabka	But Something Remains
1985	Eedam Mayet	Execution of a Dead Man
1985	Al Darb Al Ahmar	Al Darb Al Ahmar
1985	Al-Shaqqa Min Haqq Al-Zawga	The Apartment Belongs to the Wife
1985	El Saalik	The Riffraffs
1985	Al Towfan	The Flood
1985	Aafwan Ayoha Al Kanoun	Sorry Dear Law
1985	Al Kef	The Pleasure
1985	Al Magnouna	The Crazy Girl
1986	Al Bari'	The Innocent
1986	Al Goo'	The Hunger
1986	Al Hedek Yefham	The Clever Will Realize
1987	Abnaa Wa Katala	Sons and Killers
1987	Garyy El Wehoosh	The Run of The Beasts
1987	Al Sada Al Rejal	The Gentlemen
1987	Seket El Nadama	The Road To Remorse
1988	Samak, Laban, Tamr Hendi	Fish, Milk, Tamarind
1988	Nahr El Khof	The River of Fear
1989	Ya Aazizi Kolena Lessous	My Dear We Are All Thieves
1989	El Donia Ala Genah Yamama	The World on a Dove's Wing
1990	Sayedati Anessati	Ladies and Lasses
1991	Abo Cartona	Abo Cartona
1991	Kanoun Ika	Ika's Law
1991	Al-Kit Kat	Al-Kit Kat
1992	Donia Abd-Al Gabbar	Donia Abd-Al Gabbar
1992	Fakh Al Gawassis	A Trap for Spies
1993	Talata Aala El Tari'	Three on the Road
1994	Khaltabita	Khaltabita
1995	Zeyaret El Sayed El Ra'is	Presidential Visit
1995	El Bahr Beyethakli	The Sea Smiles To Me
1996	Al Gentle	The Gentle
1997	Al Kapten	The Captain
1998	Harmonica	Harmonica
2000	Soo' El Motaa	Pleasure Market
2000	Al Nems	The Ferret
2001	Al Saher	The Magician
2002	Rehla Mashbooha	A Suspicious Journey
2008	Lelet El Baby Doll	The BabyDoll Night
2009	Ibrahim Labyad	Ibrahim Labyad

=== Television ===
Year	Film	Translation
1974	Qaseera, Qaseera Al Hayat	Short, Life Is Short
1976	Shagaret El Ablab	The Ivy Tree
?	Al Dawama	The Swirl
?	Al Bashayer	The Good News
1987-1990	Raafat El-Hagan	Raafat El-Hagan
2004	Mahmoud El Masri	Mahmoud El Masri
?	Ana El Hokooma	I Am The Government
2012	Bab El Khalk	The Creatures Door
2014	Gabal El Halal	The Halal Mountain
2016	Ras El-Ghoul	The Ghoul's head

== Awards ==
- Best Actor in a movie for Kit Kat (1991) at the Damascus International Film Festival and at the Alexandria International Film Festival.
- Best Actor in a movie for The Captain (1997) at the Damascus International Film Festival.
- Best Actor in a movie for Pleasure Market (2000) at the Cairo International Film Festival.
- Best Actor in a movie for The Magician (2001) at the Damascus International Film Festival.
- Life Time Achievement at the Dubai International Film Festival.

== See also ==
- List of Egyptian films of the 1980s
- List of Egyptian films of the 1990s
