= The Yacoubian Building (film) =

- Theatrical release poster
- Directed by: Marwan Hamed
- Screenplay by: Wahid Hamed
- Based on: The Yacoubian Building by Alaa Al Aswany
- Produced by: Imad Adeeb
- Starring: Adel Emam; Nour El-Sherif; Hend Sabri; Yousra
- Cinematography: Sameh Selim
- Edited by: Khaled Marei
- Music by: Khaled Hammad
- Distributed by: Good News Group (In Egypt); Arab Co for Cinema Production & Distribution (Worldwide distributor)
- Release date: June 21, 2006
- Running time: 165 minutes
- Country: Egypt
- Language: Arabic
- Budget: $3.5 million

The Yacoubian Building (Arabic: عمارة يعقوبيان, transliterated: ʿImārat Yaʿqūbīān or Omaret Yakobean) is a 2006 Egyptian film based on the novel of the same title by author Alaa Al Aswany. It has been reported to be the highest-budgeted film in the history of Egyptian cinema.

Like the novel ostensibly set in 1990 at about the time of the first Gulf War, the film is a scathing portrayal of modern Egyptian society since the coup d'état of 1952. The setting is downtown Cairo, with the titular apartment building (which actually exists) serving as both a metaphor for contemporary Egypt and a unifying location in which most of the primary characters either live or work and in which much of the action takes place.

The actual namesake Yacoubian building, constructed in the Art Deco style, still stands in downtown Cairo at the address given in the novel: 34 Talaat Harb Street (referred to by its old name, Suleiman Basha Street, by both native Cairenes and the novel's characters). As in the novel, the film's version of the building is "in the high classical European style, the balconies decorated with Greek faces carved in stone."

After premiering at the Berlin Film Festival in 2006, the film opened in Egypt in June.

The Yacoubian Building was Egypt's official submission to the 79th Academy Awards for Best Foreign Language Film.

== Plot ==
The Yacoubian Building is rented out to tenants of varying social backgrounds; poorer residents live upstairs and on the rooftop, while more affluent ones live downstairs. Among those in the rooftop are Taha, an aspiring police officer, Busayna, his girlfriend, and Malak, an unscrupulous slumlord. Downstairs, Zaki Pasha, the elderly son of a noble and Haj Azzam, a drug dealer posing as a respectable businessman, rent units at the Yacoubian but do not reside there, while Hatim, a closeted gay writer and newspaper editor, lives alone in his unit.

Hatim is attracted to a watchman, Abd Rabbo. Despite the latter's conservatism and already being married, the two become lovers, and Hatim arranges for Abd Rabbo's family to move into a rooftop apartment at the Yacoubian. However, Hatim's son then falls ill and dies, leading Abd Rabbo and his wife to move out. In despair, Hatim recalls his childhood, when he was neglected by his parents and abused by their manservant, Idris. Hatim takes in a new lover, who reveals himself to be a petty burglar and strangles Hatim to death in his bed before stealing his belongings.

Azzam struggles to satisfy his libido when his first wife refuses to have sex with him anymore. On a business trip to Alexandria, he becomes attracted to Suad, a widowed and destitute single mother. Azzam arranges for Suad to marry him in a clandestine affair and billets her in the Yacoubian. While their relationship goes off smoothly, Azzam refuses to have another child, leading him to divorce Suad and arrange for her forced abortion when she announces her pregnancy. Meanwhile Azzam convinces the ruling party to put him up as an MP, but is then blackmailed by the party chairman, Kamal, into giving him bribes.

After Taha is rejected for the police academy when the examiners find his father works as a janitor, Taha enters university and falls into radical Islamist circles led by Sheikh Shakir. His altered worldviews lead to a falling-out with Busayna, who breaks off their engagement. Taha is arrested during an Islamist demonstration and is anally raped by the secret service. After his release, he is taken by Sheikh Shakir to a militant camp, where he undergoes military training and is introduced to a bride while he prepares his revenge. Taha is ordered to assassinate a functionary, who turns out to be Taha's rapist. Taha engages in a shootout that leaves him and his torturer dead.

Busayna struggles to find a stable job that does not entail her being sexually harassed by her employers. Malak arranges her to be employed as the housekeeper for Zaki's apartment in a bid to manipulate Zaki into transferring ownership of his apartment to him. Zaki moves into the Yacoubian after he is expelled from his domicile and sued by his sister Dawlat, who wants to take the Yacoubian apartment for herself. Busayna becomes fascinated with Zaki's urbane lifestyle and the two fall in love. After a drunk night out, Busayna takes advantage of Zaki to sign away his deed over the apartment to Malak, but Zaki collapses and suffers violent spasms before he could affix his signature. A remorseful Busayna helps Zaki to bed and rips the deed into pieces. After Dawlat unsuccessfully tries to have Zaki and Busayna arrested for adultery, the two finally marry, with the final scene showing them walking back to the Yacoubian.

== Cast ==
- Adel Emam as Zaki Pasha
- Nour El-Sherif as Haj Azzam
- Yousra as Christine
- Hend Sabri as Bosaina
- Somaya El Khashab
- Khaled El Sawy as Hatem Rasheed
- Issad Younis as Dawlat
- Ahmed Bedeir as Malak
- Ahmed Rateb
- Khaled Saleh
- Bassem Samra
- Mohamed Emam as Taha El-Shazli
- Youssef Daoud

== Commercial and critical reception ==
Having received the Adults Only seal from the board of censors in Egypt, the film debuted on June 25 to box office returns of over LE 6,000,000 in its first week, according to Al Ahram daily, giving it the record for the biggest debut ever for a theatrical film in Egypt. It went on to gross LE 20 million during its initial theatrical run.

== TV series ==
After the success of the film in 2006, a television series under the same name of Yacoubian Building was launched in 2007 with a major difference – the gay character in the film and the source novel was excised from the TV series adaptation of the novel because of its controversial nature.
