= Ali Hassanein (actor) =

Egyptian actor (1939–2015)

- Born: 13 January 1939; Alexandria, Egypt
- Died: 12 August 2015 (aged 76); Alexandria, Egypt
- Occupation: Actor

Ali Hassanein (13 January 1939 – 12 August 2015) was an Egyptian actor.

Born in Alexandria, he was active on local radio until 1961, when he moved to Cairo to work in television. Active for over fifty years in TV, cinema, and stage, his notable roles included that of Sheikh Obaid in Daoud Abdel Sayed's comedy The Kit Kat, and that of Uncle Ziryab in Khairy Beshara's film Ice Cream in Glym (1992).

Hassanein died aged 76 from liver cancer on August 12, 2015.

== See also ==
- List of Egyptians
