= Alaa Al Aswany =

Egyptian novelist (born 1957)

- علاء الأسواني
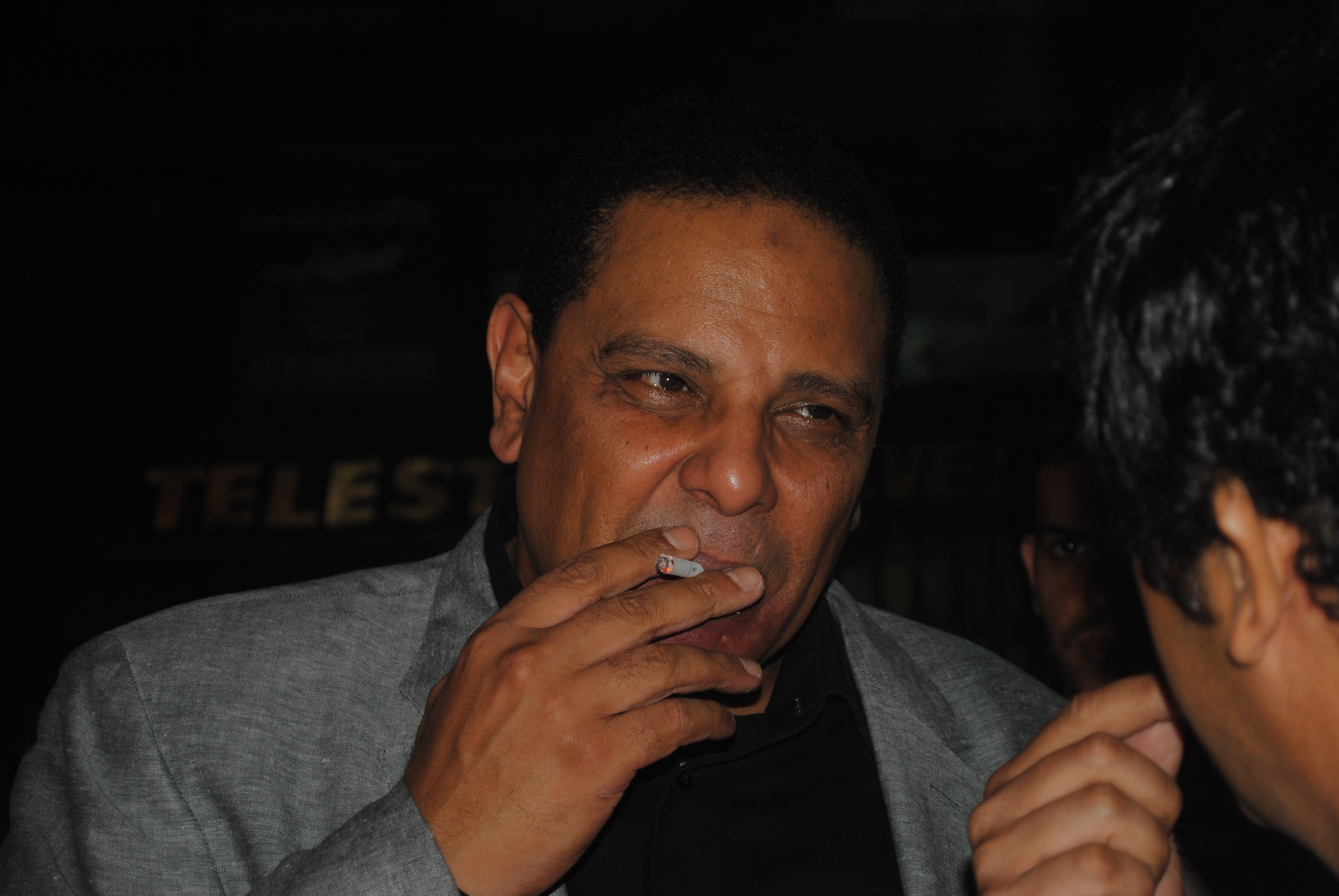
- Al Aswany in Tahrir Square on 12 August 2011
- Born: 26 May 1957 (age 69); Cairo, Egypt
- Citizenship: Egyptian
- Education: Cairo University; University of Illinois at Chicago
- Occupations: Writer, novelist, and dentist
- Spouse: Eman Taymoor (1993–present)
- Writing career
- Language: Egyptian Arabic, Classical Arabic, French, Spanish, English
- Years active: 1990–
- Notable works: The Isam Abd el-Ati Papers (1990); The Yacoubian Building; Chicago (2007); Friendly Fire (2004, 2008); The Automobile Club of Egypt (2013); The Republic of False Truths (2021)
- Notable awards: Bashraheel Award for Arabic Novel (2005); The International Cavafi Award (2005); Bruno-Kriesky Award (2008); Tiziano Terzani Literary Award; Ordre des Arts et des Lettres (Order of Arts and Letters, France, 2016); Grand Prix of the Novel, Toulon France Festival (2006); Grinzani Cavour Award, Turin, Italy (2007); Mediterranean Culture Award, Naples, Italy (2007); Friedrich Rukert Literary Award (2008); Bruno Kreisky literary Award, Austria (2008); Achievement Award from the University of Illinois (2010); Majidi bin Zahir Arab Literature Award, Montreal, Canada (2011); Tiziano Terzani Award, Odeon, Italy (2011); Johann Philipp Palm Award, Germany (2012)
- Website: alaaalaswany.com

Alaa Al Aswany (Arabic: علاء الأسواني, romanized: ʿAlāʾ al-Aswānī, IPA: [ʕæˈlæːʔ elɑsˈwɑːni]; born 26 May 1957) is an Egyptian writer, novelist, dentist and a founding member of the political movement Kefaya. He is based in Paris and New York, where he lives and teaches creative writing.

== Early life and career ==
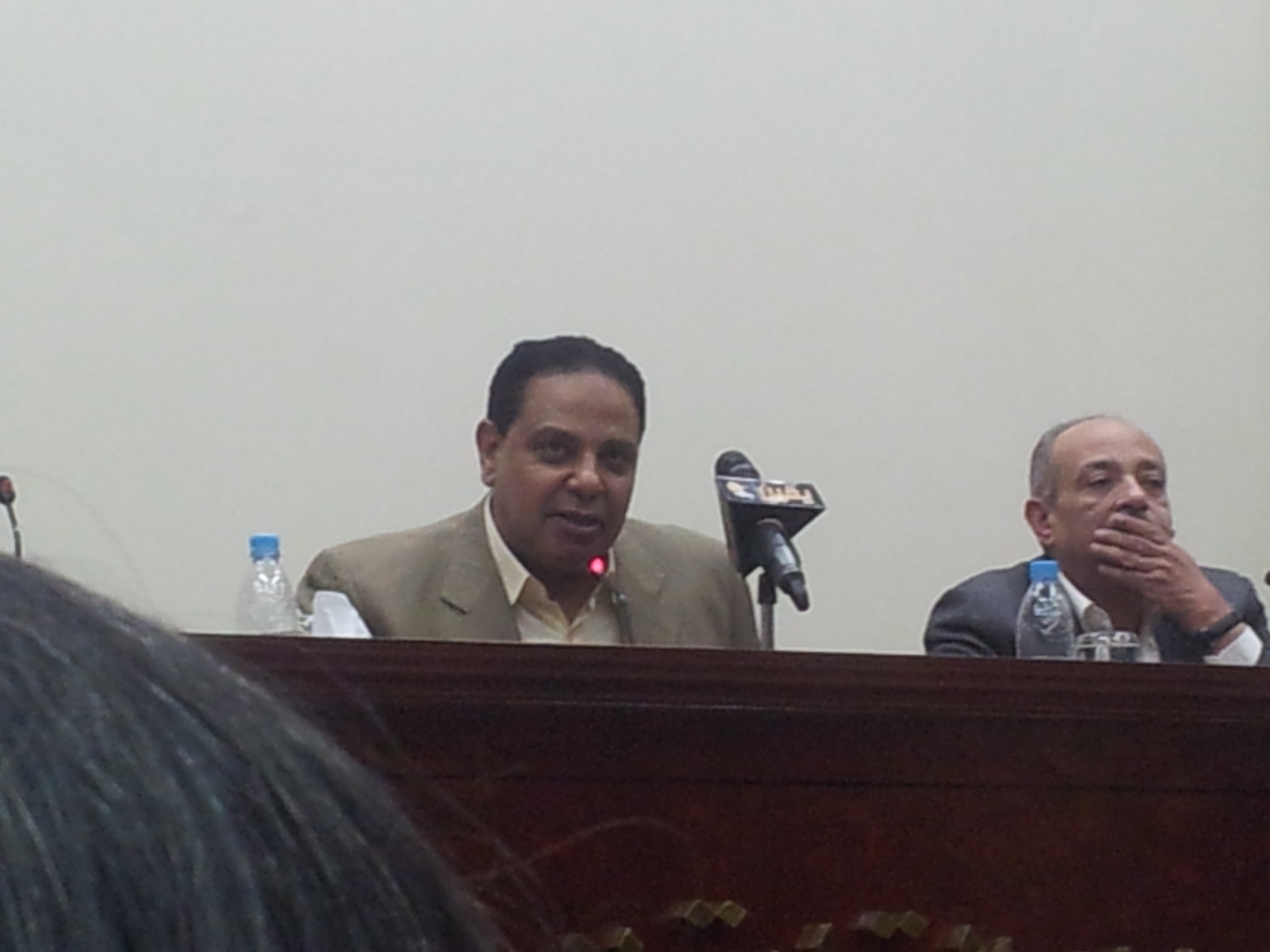
Al-Aswany during his monthly seminar in the "Leadership and Management Development Center", 25 April 2013.

Alaa Al Aswany was born on 26 May 1957 in Cairo. His mother, Zainab, came from an aristocratic family; her uncle was a Pasha and Minister of Education before the Egyptian Revolution of 1952. His father, Abbas Al Aswany, was from Aswan (in Lower Nubia) and was a lawyer and writer who "is remembered as being a captivating and charismatic speaker with a broad following and loyalty within a cross-section of the Egyptian revolutionary intelligentsia". Abbas Al Aswany wrote a regular back-page essay entitled "Aswaaniyat" in the Egyptian weekly magazine Rose al-Yūsuf. In 1972, he was "the recipient of the state award for literature". He died when Al Aswany was 19 years old.

Al Aswany attended Le Lycée Français in Cairo and received a bachelor's degree in dental and oral medicine at Cairo University in 1980. He went on to pursue a master's degree in dentistry at the University of Illinois at Chicago in 1985. He speaks Arabic, English, French, and Spanish. He studied Spanish literature in Madrid.

Al Aswany married his first wife in his early twenties. She was a dentist and they had a son, Seif. They later divorced. When he was 37, he married Eman Taymoor and they had two daughters, May and Nada.

He wrote a weekly literary critique entitled "Parenthetically" in the Egyptian newspaper Al-Sha'ab, and then became responsible for the culture page in the same newspaper. He wrote a monthly political article in the Egyptian newspaper Al-Arabi Al-Nasseri and a weekly article in the Egyptian newspaper Al-Dustour. He also wrote a weekly article in the Egyptian newspaper Al-Shorouk. Following the revolution, he wrote a weekly article in Al-Masry Al-Youm on Tuesdays. His articles have been published in leading international newspapers such as The New York Times, Le Monde, El País, The Guardian, The Independent, and others.

His second novel, The Yacoubian Building, an ironic depiction of modern Egyptian society, has been widely read in Egypt and throughout the Middle East. His literary works have been translated into 37 languages, including Armenian, Bosnian, Bulgarian, Castilian, Chinese, Croatian, Danish, Dutch, English, Estonian, Finnish, French, Galician, German, Greek, Hebrew, Icelandic, Italian, Japanese, Korean, Malaysian, Norwegian, Polish, Portuguese, Romanian, Russian, Serbian, Slovak, Slovenian, Spanish, Swedish, and Turkish. In 2006, The Yacoubian Building was adapted into "the biggest budget movie ever produced in Egypt". The movie was screened at international film festivals and was a great success in Egypt. However, Al Aswany was banned from attending the premiere. The Yacoubian Building is one of a few movies that addresses social taboos and widespread governmental corruption in Egypt, such as the rigging of elections. In 2007, The Yacoubian Building was made into a television series of the same name. In fact, many intellectuals believe that this work played a crucial role in triggering revolutionary sentiments among the Egyptian people. Al Aswany claims that during the Egyptian Revolution of 2011, many protesters approached him and said: "We are here because of what you wrote."

Chicago, a novel set in the city in which the author was educated, was published in January 2007 and his Automobile Club of Egypt was published in English in 2016.

Al Aswany's name has been included on the list of the 500 Most Influential Muslims in the World, issued by the Royal Islamic Strategic Studies Center in Amman, Jordan. He was number one in the Foreign Policy Top 100 Global Thinkers list 2011.

Al Aswany participated in the Blue Metropolis literary festival in Montreal, June 2008 and April 2010, and was featured in interviews with the CBC programme Writers and Company.

In January 2015, the Gingko Library published Democracy is the Answer: Egypt's Years of Revolution, a collection of newspaper columns written by Al Aswany for Al-Masry Al-Youm between 2011 and 2014.

In 2018, Al Aswany published a novel titled Jumhuriyat ka'an (جمهورية كأن, literally: The Republic of As-If; translated into English as The Republic of False Truths), which takes place in the backdrop of the 2011 Revolution.

His latest novel, Ashgar Tamshi fi-alaskandaryia (Arabic: الأشجار تمشي في الأسكندرية, The Trees Walk in Alexandria) was published in 2024.

== Political views ==
Al Aswany was in Tahrir Square each of the 18 days before Mubarak fell from power. He was one of the few prominent people to interview the Mubarak-appointed Prime Minister Ahmed Shafik on an Egyptian channel. Shafik lost his temper under persistent grilling by the novelist and it was the first time for Egyptians to witness a ruler dressed down so severely by a civilian in public. Consequently, it is said that Shafik was fired by the SCAF. Al Aswany supported the 2013 Coup d'état against the Muslim brotherhood-led government, stating that they were neither democratic. He said: "They are a group of terrorists and fascists." He compared then-elected president Morsi to deposed president Mubarak in terms of dictatorship and repression of freedoms.

In an interview with Robert Fisk in 2014, Al Aswany said "I think we must give the Sisi government a chance. People are terrorised", while acknowledging that Sisi is not a true democrat.

Since 2019, Al Aswany has been living in Paris and New York in self-exile after he was sued by the Egyptian government for "insulting the state".

In 2022, after exile and in the wake of publishing his new novel, Al Aswany stated in a CBC radio interview: "I'm quite sure the revolution will win and I believe the change has already happened ... the future is on our side."

Al Aswany remains critical of the Egyptian government through his online lectures on his YouTube channel. He often states that "Democracy is the solution". He is also critical of other Middle Eastern regimes. Following the Gaza war, Al Aswany was highly critical of the government of Israel, calling for Liberation of Palestine, and the liberation of all the Middle East from tyranny and occupation.

Al Aswany often draws comparisons between the periods of the Kingdom of Egypt and the Republic of Egypt, criticizing the 1952 Free Officers movement as the source of most of the social and economic troubles in contemporary Egypt.

== Bibliography (in Arabic) ==
=== Novels ===
- 1990: Awrāq ʾIṣṣām ʾAbd il-ʾĀṭī (Arabic: أوراق عصام عبد العاطى, The Papers of Essam Abdel Aaty)
- 2002: ʿImārat Yaʾqūbiyān (Arabic: عمارة يعقوبيان, The Yacoubian Building)
- 2007: Chicago (Arabic: شيكاجو)
- 2013: Nādī il-sayyārāt (Arabic: نادي السيارات, The Automobile Club of Egypt)
- 2018: Jumhuriyat ka'an (Arabic: جمهورية كأن, The Republic of False Truths)
- 2024: Ashgar Tamshi fi-alaskandaryia (Arabic: الأشجار تمشي في الأسكندرية, The Trees Walk in Alexandria)

=== Short stories ===
- 1990: Alladhī iqtarab wa raʾa (Arabic: الذى اقترب و رأى, "Who Approached and Saw")
- 1998: Jamʾiyat muntaẓirī il-zaʿīm (Arabic: جمعية منتظرى الزعيم, "Waiting for a Leader")
- 2004: Nīrān sadīqa (Arabic: نيران صديقة, "Friendly Fire")

=== Articles ===
- 2010: Li mā dhā lā yathūr il-Miṣriyūn (Arabic: لماذا لا يثور المصريون؟, "Why Don't Egyptians Revolt?”)
- 2011: Hal nastaḥiqq il-dimuqrāṭiyya? (Arabic: هل نستحق الديمقراطية؟, "Do We Deserve Democracy?”)
- 2011: Miṣr ʿalā dikkat il-iḥṭiyāṭy (Arabic: مصر على دكة الإحتياطى, "Egypt on the Reserve Bench")
- 2012: Hal akhṭaʾat il-thawra il-Miṣriyya? (Arabic: هل أخطأت الثورة المصرية؟, "Did the Egyptian Revolution Go Wrong?")
- 2014: Kayf naṣnaʾ il-diktātūr? (Arabic: كيف نصنع الديكتاتور؟, "How do we make the Dictator?”)
- Since November 2013, Al Aswany has been writing a monthly opinion column for the International Herald Tribune/New York Times.

=== English translations ===
- Alaa Al Aswany (15 February 2015). Democracy is the Answer: Egypt's Years of Revolution. University of Chicago Press. ISBN 978-1-909942-71-4.
- Alaa Al Aswany (12 April 2011). On the State of Egypt: What Made the Revolution Inevitable. Knopf Doubleday Publishing Group. ISBN 978-0-307-94699-7.
- Alaa Al Aswany (2009). Friendly Fire. Translated by Humphrey Davies. Fourth Estate. ISBN 978-0-00-730600-8.
- Alaa Al Aswany (6 October 2009). Chicago. Translated by Farouk Abdel Wahab. HarperCollins. ISBN 978-0-06-198188-3.
- Alaa Al Aswany, The Yacoubian Building, HarperPerennial, 2007
- Alaa Al Aswany, The Yacoubian Building, Fourth Estate, 2007
- Alaa Al Aswany, The Yacoubian Building, Humphrey Davies (translator), HarperPerennial, 2006
- Alaa Al Aswany, The Yacoubian Building, Humphrey Davies (translator), The American University in Cairo Press, 2004
- Alaa Al Aswany, The Republic of False Truths, S. R. Fellowes (translator), 2021. ISBN 9780307957221

== Awards ==
- 2005: Yemen Bashraheel Award for Arabic Novel, (Arabic: جائزة باشراحيل للرواية العربية)
- 2005: Greece The International Cavafi Award
- 2006: France The Great Novel Award from Toulon Festival
- 2007: Italy The Culture Award from The Foundation of The Mediterranean
- 2007: Italy Grinzane Cavour Award
- 2008: Austria Bruno-Kriesky Award
- 2008: Germany Friedrich Award
- 2010: USA University of Illinois Achievement Award
- 2011: Canada Blue Metropolis Award for Arabic Literature
- 2012: Italy Tiziano Terzani Literary Award
- 2012: Italy Mediterranean Cultural Award
- 2012: Germany Johann Philipp Palm Award
- 2016: France Ordre des Arts et des Lettres
