= The Yacoubian Building =

2002 novel by Alaa Al Aswani

- The book's cover
- Author: Alaa al-Aswany
- Original title: Imarat Yaqubian
- Translator: Humphrey T. Davies
- Language: Arabic
- Genre: Novel
- Published: 2002 (American University in Cairo Press, in Arabic), 2004 (in English)
- Publication place: Egypt
- Media type: Print (Hardback)
- Pages: 272 pp (first Eng. edition, hardback)
- ISBN: 977-424-862-7 (first Eng. edition, hardback)
- OCLC: 57298874

The Yacoubian Building (Arabic: عمارة يعقوبيان ‘Imārat Ya‘qūbyān) is a novel by Egyptian author Alaa-Al-Aswany. The book was made into a film of the same name in 2006 and into a TV series in 2007.

Published in Arabic in 2002 and in an English translation in 2004, the book, ostensibly set in 1990 at about the time of the first Gulf War, is a roman à clef and scathing portrayal of modern Egyptian society since the Revolution of 1952. The locale of the novel is downtown Cairo, with the titular apartment building (which actually exists) serving as both a metaphor for contemporary Egypt and a unifying location in which most of the primary characters either live or work and in which much of the novel's action takes place. The author, a dentist by profession, had his first office in the Yacoubian Building in Cairo.

The Yacoubian Building was the best-selling Arabic novel for 2002 and 2003, and was voted Best Novel for 2003 by listeners to Egypt's Middle East Broadcasting Service. It has been translated into 23 languages.

== Title ==
The actual namesake building, constructed in the Art Deco style, still stands in downtown Cairo at the address given in the novel: 34, Talaat Harb Street (referred to by its old name, Suleiman Pasha Street, by both native Cairenes and the novel's characters), although its true appearance differs from its description in the book. Al Aswany writes of its fictional counterpart as having been designed "in the high classical European style, the balconies decorated with Greek faces carved in stone, the columns, steps, and corridors all of natural marble."

== Plot summary ==
The novel described the Yacoubian Building as one of the most luxurious and prestigious apartment blocks in Cairo following its construction by Armenian businessman Hagop Yacoubian in 1934, with government ministers, wealthy manufacturers, and foreigners residing or working out of offices there. After the revolution in 1952, which overthrew King Farouk and gave power to Gamal Abdel Nasser, many of the rich foreigners, as well as native landowners and businessmen, who had lived at the Yacoubian fled the country. Each vacated apartment was then occupied by a military officer and his family, who were often of a more rural background and lower social caste than the previous residents.

On the roof of the ten-story building are fifty small rooms (one for each apartment), no more than two meters by two meters in area, which were originally used as storage areas and not as living quarters for human beings, but after wealthy residents began moving from downtown Cairo to suburbs such as Medinet Nasr and Mohandessin in the 1970s, the rooms were gradually taken over by overwhelmingly poor migrants from the Egyptian countryside, arriving in Cairo in the hopes of finding employment. The rooftop community, effectively a slum neighborhood, is symbolic of the urbanization of Egypt and of the burgeoning population growth in its large cities in recent decades, especially among the poor and working classes.

== Main characters ==
- Zaki Bey el Dessouki – a wealthy and elderly foreign-educated engineer who spends most of his time pursuing women and who maintains an office in the Yacoubian, he personifies the ruling class prior to the Revolution: cosmopolitan, cultured, western in outlook, and not particularly observant of Islam
- Taha el Shazli – the son of the building doorman, he excelled in school and hoped to be admitted to the police academy but found that his father's profession, considered too lowly by the generals conducting his character interview, was an obstacle to admission; disaffected, he enrolls at the university and eventually joins a militant Islamist organization modeled upon the Jamaa Islamya
- Busayna el Sayed – initially Taha's childhood sweetheart, she is forced to find a job to help support her family after her father dies and is disillusioned to find that her male employer expects sexual favors from her and her female coworkers in exchange for additional money and gifts on the side, and that her mother expects her to preserve her virginity while not refusing her boss's sexual advances outright; embittered, she eventually comes to use her beauty as a tool to advance her own interests but finds herself falling in love with Zaki Bey el Dessouki, whom she'd been planning with Malak to swindle out of his apartment
- Malak – a shirtmaker and petty schemer seeking to open a shop on the Yacoubian's roof and then to hustle his way into one of the more posh apartments downstairs
- Hatim Rasheed – the son of an Egyptian father who was a noted legal scholar and a French mother, he is the editor of Le Caire, a French-language daily newspaper; more attention is paid to his private life, for he is a fairly open homosexual in a society which either looks the other way or openly condemns such behavior and inclinations
- Hagg Muhammad Azzam – one of Egypt's wealthiest men and a migrant to Cairo from the countryside, in the space of thirty years he has gone from shoeshiner to self-made millionaire on the back of his cleverly covered activities as a drug dealer; he wears the mask of a religious man; he seeks an acceptable and legal outlet for his (temporarily) resurgent libido in a secret, second marriage to an attractive young widow, and also realizes his goal of serving in the People's Assembly (Parliament), but comes face to face with the enormous corruption, graft, and bribery of contemporary Egyptian politics.

== Literary significance and criticism ==
The Yacoubian Building's treatment of homosexuality is taboo-breaking, particularly for contemporary mainstream Arab literature. Khaled Diab, in an article entitled "Cultural rainbows", explores this aspect of the novel, and how this can help change popular attitudes to homosexuality in the Arab world.
