= The Yacoubian Building (TV series) =

2007 Egyptian television series

The Yacoubian Building (Arabic: عمارة يعقوبيان ʿImārat Yaʿqūbīān) is a 2007 Egyptian television series based on the scenario of Atef Beshai and directed by Ahmad Saqr. The television series is based on the 2002 novel The Yacoubian Building by Egyptian author Alaa el-Aswany and the 2006 film, The Yacoubian Building, by Marwan Hamed, with the mentioning of the character of the homosexual in the original film being excised from the TV series adaptation of the novel because of its controversial nature in Arabic culture.
