= Yacoubian Building (Beirut) =

Building in Beirut, Lebanon

Coordinates: 33°53′43″N 35°28′24″E

The Yacoubian building is a commercial and residential edifice in Beirut, Lebanon. The building is located in Caracas neighborhood of Ras Beirut, in a coastal strip of the Lebanese capital Beirut. The building belonged to a Lebanese-Armenian named Yacoub Yacoubian.

The edifice is a 10-story, double-bloc building with 140 flats. Unlike the colonial style of Cairo's Yacoubian Building, Beirut's counterpart comes shaped like a U-turn, copying the style of Le Corbusier. The building was famous for hosting a number of artists, including singer Fayza Ahmed and comedian Abdel Salam Al Nabulsy. One floor underground was the venue of a night club called The Venus. During the Lebanese Civil War, the Venus closed its doors and the Yacoubian building declined.

The then-chic and now run-down edifice is a metaphor of Beirut's old architectural heritage and is subject of Spectrice (Yacoubian Building, Beirut) display and work of art commissioned in 2006-08 and made of non-shrinking grout, aluminium, glass, fabric.

Beirut's Yacoubian Building is not to be confused with an edifice in Cairo, Egypt, called Yacoubian Building belonged to the Lebanese-Armenian businessman Hagop Yacoubian, from the same family.
