= Youssef Dawoud =

Egyptian actor

- Born: 10 March 1933; Alexandria, Egypt
- Died: 24 June 2012 (aged 79); Alexandria, Egypt
- Education: Alexandria University
- Occupation: Actor
- Years active: 1933–2012
- Children: 2

Youssef Dawoud (Arabic: يوسف داود; 10 March 1933 – 24 June 2012) was a Coptic Egyptian actor, who worked in theatre, cinema and television.

Dawoud started acting when studying at Alexandria University. After graduating from the Faculty of Engineering Department of Electricity, Alexandria University, in 1960, he worked for Alexandria Oils and Soap Company and engaged in amateur acting until 1986 when he took up acting full-time. He played the part of the British General Lipton in the United Artist production of Zuqaq Al-Madaq, based on the novel by Naguib Mahfouz. He moved to Cairo, joined the Actors' Syndicate and studied at the Theatre Institute.

Dawoud married in 1961 and had two children, a son and a daughter.

== Theatre ==
- Mala'eeb (Ploys)
- Al-Za'im (Leader)
- Al-Wad Sayed Al- Shaghal (Sayed the Servant Boy)

== Film ==
- Al-Nimr wal-Untha (The Tiger and the Woman),
- Kaboria (Kaborya)
- Samak Laban Tamr Hindi (Fish Milk Tamarind)
- Al-Shaytana Allati Ahabbatni (The Devil Who Loved Me)
- Morgan Ahmad Morgan (Morgan Ahmad Morgan).
- Assal Eswed (Molasses)
- Zarf Tariq (Tariq's Letter)
- Ameer Al-Thalaam (Prince of Darkness)

== Television ==
- Al-Souq (The Market),
- Samhouni Makansh Qasdi (Forgive Me I Didn't Mean To),
- Al-Ganeb Al-Akhar (The Other Side)
- Raafat El-Haggan.
- Yawmeyat Wanis [Wanis' Days]
