= January 1974 =

Month of 1974

<<	January 1974					>>
Su	Mo	Tu	We	Th	Fr	Sa
		1	2	3	4	5
6	7	8	9	10	11	12
13	14	15	16	17	18	19
20	21	22	23	24	25	26
27	28	29	30	31

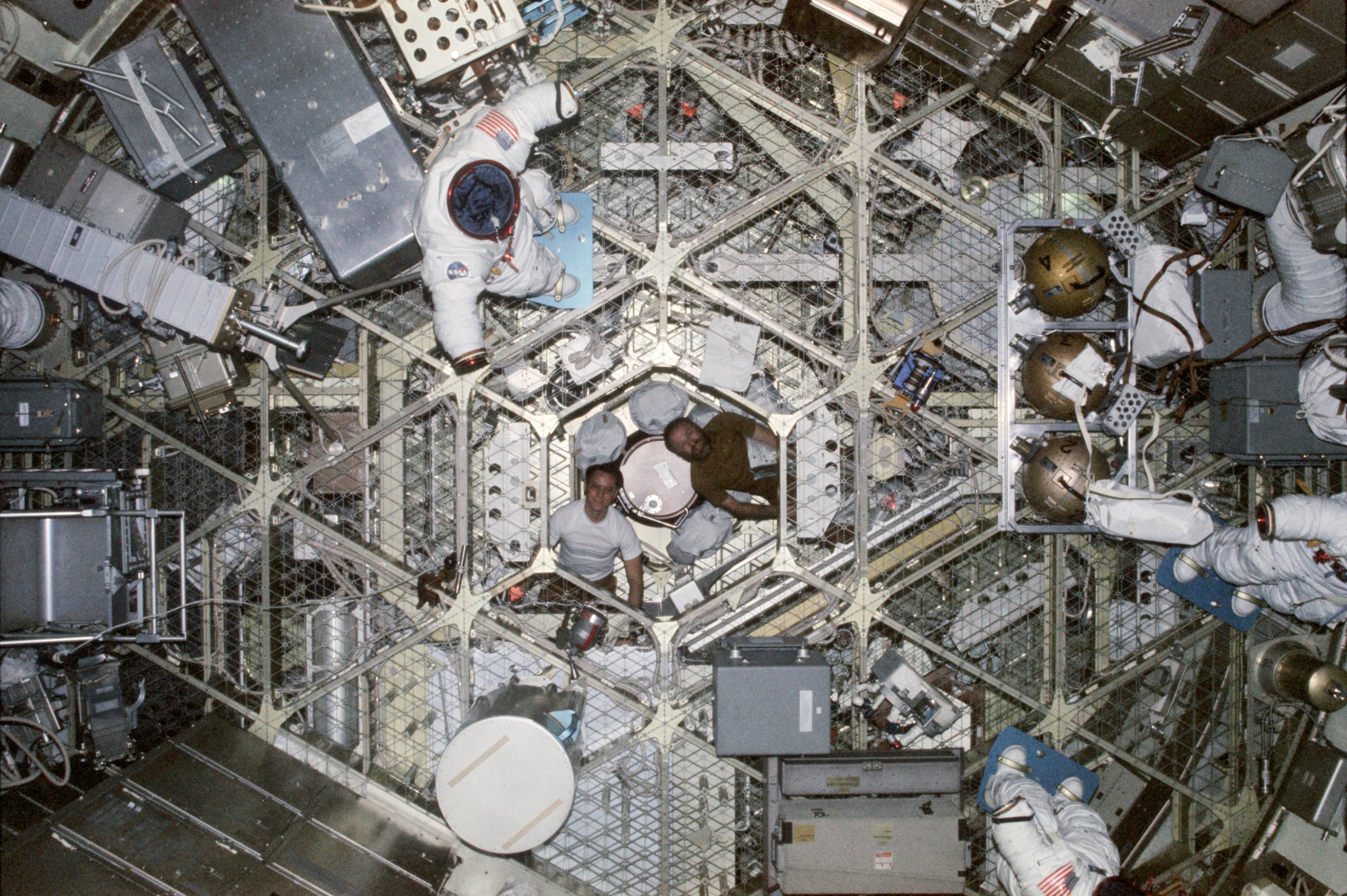
January 15, 1974: On the Skylab 4 mission, U.S. astronauts Edward Gibson and Gerald Carr set a new record for longest time in space.

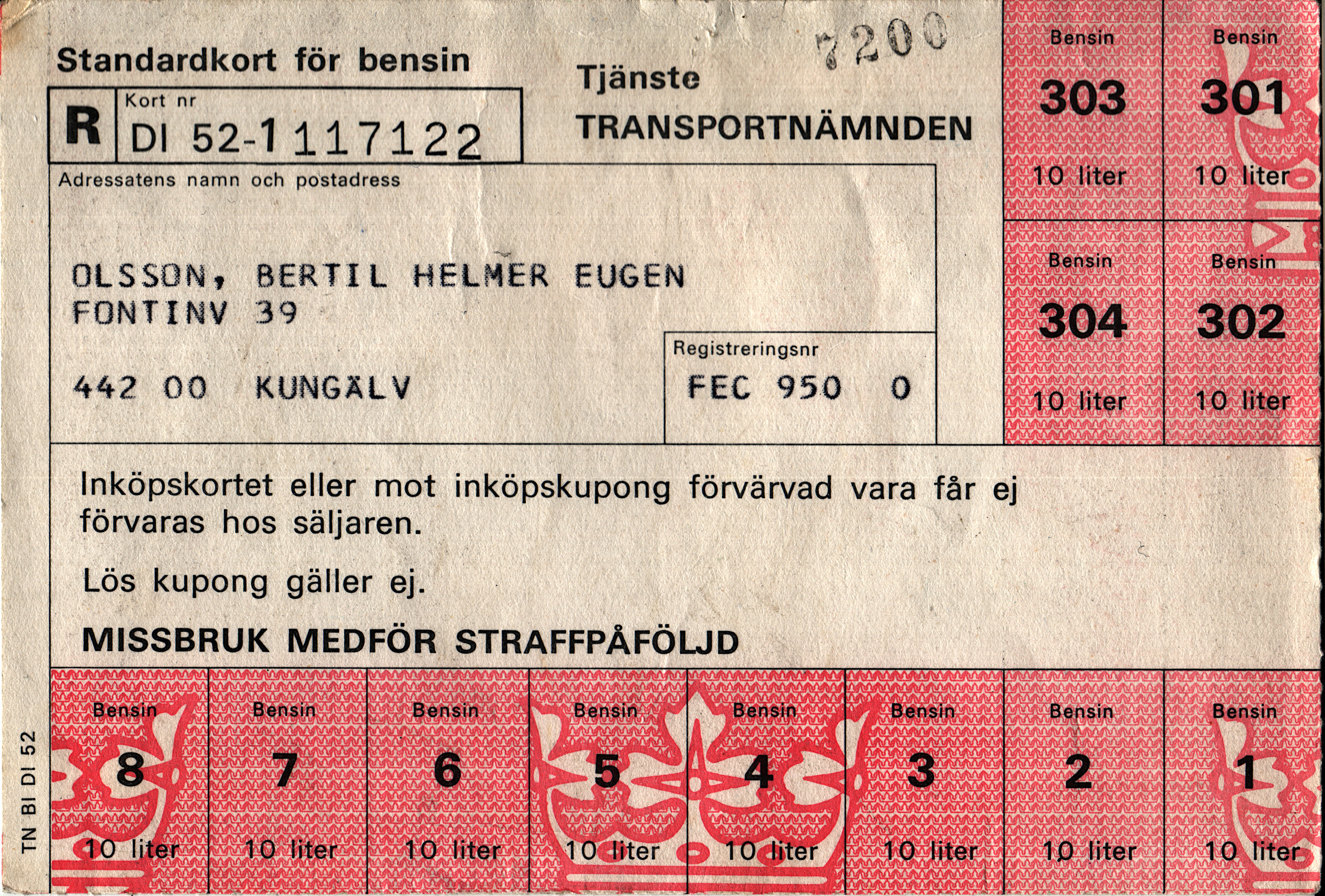
January 7, 1974: Sweden becomes first major nation to begin gasoline rationing during oil crisis, with coupons allowing maximum 10 liters (2.6 U.S. gallons) purchase.

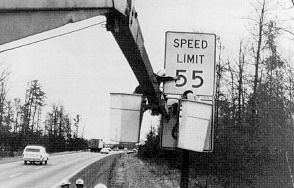
January 2, 1974: U.S. lowers speed limit to 55 miles per hour nationwide to save energy, a maximum that remains for the next 13 years

The following events occurred in January 1974:

== January 1, 1974 (Tuesday) ==
- In Italy, Itavia Airlines Flight 897 crashed, killing 38 of the 42 people aboard. Flying in a heavy fog, the Fokker F28 Fellowship jet was approaching a landing at Turin on a flight from Bologna when it struck the top of a tree and then impacted at a building under construction.
- New Year's Day was celebrated as a public holiday in the United Kingdom for the first time nationwide, as England and Wales joined in making the first day of the year a paid legal holiday. Scotland had celebrated New Year's Day as a public holiday for years, and the order was applied to all of Britain by an October 8 amendment to existing wage laws.
- The Canadian Stock Exchange merged with the Montreal Stock Exchange, with the merged entity operating under the latter name.
- In the U.S. college football bowl games, the #4-ranked Ohio State Buckeyes defeated the #7 USC Trojans 42 to 21 to win the Rose Bowl in Pasadena, California; the #6 Penn State Nittany Lions beat the #13 LSU Tigers 16 to 9 to win the 1974 Orange Bowl in Miami; and the #12 Nebraska Cornhuskers upset the #8 Texas Longhorns 19 to 3 to win the Cotton Bowl in Dallas. The largest of the bowl games, the Sugar Bowl, had been played on December 31, with the #3 Notre Dame Fighting Irish beating the number one ranked Alabama Crimson Tide, 24 to 23.
- Jimmy Connors of the U.S. defeated Australia's Phil Dent, and Australia's Evonne Goolagong defeated Chris Evert of the U.S., to win the Australian Open tennis tournament in Melbourne.
- Ernst Brugger became President of the Swiss Confederation.
- Woodsworth College at the University of Toronto was founded, formally integrating part-time degree students into the university.

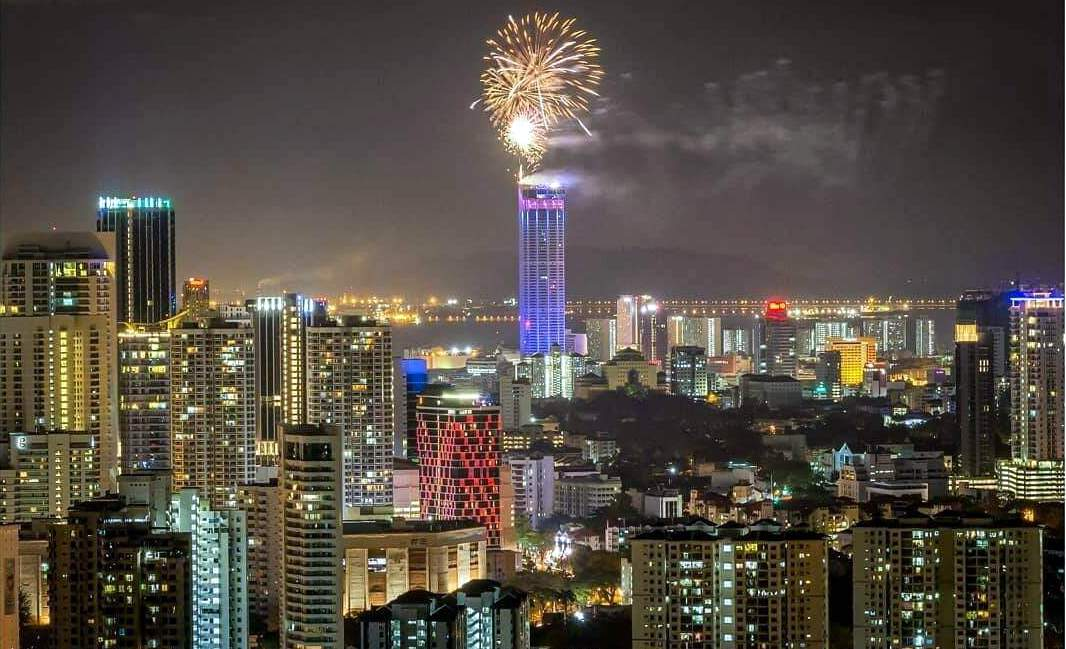
Komtar building on January 1, 2018

- At the driving of the first pile for the Komtar building in George Town, Penang, Malaysia, Prime Minister Abdul Razak Hussein said that the tower "would change the face of the city".
- On the seventh annual World Day of Peace, Pope Paul VI gave a sermon at St. Anthony's Church in Rome, saying that peace "deals with life itself, more even than the physical safety of populations, of their honor, of their name, of their history... Will peace last: yes or no?"
- The Executive of the 1974 Northern Ireland Assembly, comprising Brian Faulkner's moderate Ulster Unionist Party and the non-violent nationalists of the Social Democratic and Labour Party, was formed in Belfast, Northern Ireland.
- Due to the oil crisis, large numbers of gas stations throughout the United States were closed on New Year's Day. Mrs. Judith Kathleen Bovard of Lake Jackson, Texas, was killed when her car crashed and burned while she was carrying a can of gasoline.
- Maurice Nadon, who had been the Acting Commissioner of the Royal Canadian Mounted Police (RCMP) since December 29, was formally appointed as the 16th commissioner, becoming the first French Canadian to hold the post.
- Born:
  - Jonah Peretti, U.S. Internet entrepreneur, co-founder of BuzzFeed and The Huffington Post; in Contra Costa County, California
  - Marco Schreyl, German television host of Deutschland sucht den Superstar since 2005; in Erfurt, East Germany
  - Mehdi Ben Slimane, Tunisian footballer with 34 caps for the national team; in Le Kram
  - Constantinos Carydis, Greek orchestra conductor; in Athens
  - Abha Dawesar, Indian novelist known for the 2005 coming of age novel Babyji; in New Delhi
  - Christian Paradis, Canadian Minister of Industry 2011 to 2013; in Thetford Mines, Quebec
  - Giorgos Theodotou, Cypriot footballer with 70 caps for the Cyprus national team; in Ammochostos
- Died:
  - Charles E. Bohlen, 69, U.S. Ambassador to the Soviet Union 1953 to 1957, to the Philippines 1957-1959 and to France, 1962–1968, died of cancer.
  - Charles M. Teague, 64, U.S. Representative for California since 1955, died at home during a recess in Congress.

== January 2, 1974 (Wednesday) ==
- The maximum speed limit on U.S. highways was lowered to 55 miles per hour (89 km/h), a limit that would remain in effect for the next 13 years, in order to conserve gasoline during the OPEC embargo. The decrease in the speed limit (which had been 70 miles per hour (110 km/h)) was made as U.S. President Richard Nixon signed the National Maximum Speed Law. The result was a 23 percent decrease in fatalities on American highways with 853 fewer deaths in January 1974 compared to January 1973.
- The Xinhua News Agency of the People's Republic of China announced the sudden reassignment of eight of the 11 commanders of its military regions, in an apparent attempt to remove them from the power bases and networks that they had built over the years. General Xu Shiyou was moved from the Nanjing region to Guangzhou, while Guangzhou's General Ting Sheng was moved to Nanjing. Chen Hsi-lien was moved from Manchuria to Beijing and replaced by Li Desheng, a Politburo member.
- Carlos Arias Navarro was sworn in as Prime Minister of Spain, having been appointed to the position after the December 20 assassination of Luis Carrero Blanco.
- The first Supplemental Security Income (SSI) checks were mailed under the program in the United States to compensate impoverished persons who had been unable to work because of disability but who did not qualify for Social Security disability. The law authorizing SSI had come into effect on January 1.
- The American-owned oil rig Transocean III sank in the North Sea, 100 miles (160 km) east of the Orkney Islands, shortly after midnight on the morning of January 2. All 56 crew members were rescued.
- Coleman Young was sworn in as the first African-American mayor of the U.S. city of Detroit. In his inaugural speech, he warned criminals to "hit the road".
- On their 48th day of spaceflight, the Skylab 4 crew held a televised news conference while in Earth orbit, during which astronaut William Pogue said that he tried too hard to do a good job in the early phases of the mission, but then "finally came to the realization that I'm a fallible human being". Mission commander Gerald Carr said that he missed drinking cold beer while watching football. Astronaut Edward Gibson said that he was pleased to be contributing to science.
- Born:
  - Jason de Vos, Canadian soccer player with 49 caps for the Canada men's national soccer team; in London, Ontario
  - Ludmila Formanová, Czech middle-distance runner, 1999 world champion in the 800 meter run; in Čáslav, Czechoslovakia
  - Slavko Duščak, Slovenian basketball player and coach, guard for the Slovenia national basketball team; in Ljubljana, Socialist Federal Republic of Yugoslavia
  - Juha Lind, Finnish ice hockey left wing for the Finland national team; in Helsinki
  - Yin Yin, Chinese Olympic volleyball player for the China national women's team; in Zhejiang province
- Died:
  - Tex Ritter, 68, American country music singer best known for "The Ballad of High Noon", and actor in film Westerns including the Tex Haines series of movies, later inducted into the Country Music Hall of Fame
  - E. L. Cord, 79, American business executive, founder and chairman of the Cord Corporation conglomerate that controlled American Airways, the Checker Motors Corporation, and 150 other companies.
  - Ralph Block, 84, American film producer and screenwriter
  - Mark Fax, 62, American classical music composer
  - Neva Gerber, 79, American silent film actress

== January 3, 1974 (Thursday) ==
The new flag of Burma

- A new constitution for the Socialist Republic of the Union of Burma took effect on the eve of its independence day celebrations, establishing a one-party regime. It had been approved in a constitutional referendum held on 15 December. Burma also adopted a new flag. As part of the celebration, Burma's government released 1,212 political prisoners, but detained 1,028 others.
- The Navnirman Andolan or "Re-invention Movement" took place in India at Ahmedabad, in the state of Gujarat, as students of an engineering school, who had been up in arms since December 20 against price increases for food at the school, confronted the police who tried to intervene. Some students were arrested. On January 7, the protesters called for an indefinite student strike for Gujarat state's universities and colleges and increased their demands to new campus facilities, better food and the arrest of black market sellers.
- On Victoria Street in East Sydney, a 30-man team of workmen used sledgehammers and axes to batter down the doors of 19 houses in the King's Cross section of the city, 13 of which were occupied by squatters who had barricaded themselves inside to protest against a proposed development and then defied a court order of eviction. Police arrested 40 of those who refused to get out of the way.
- U.S. District Judge Julius Hoffman dismissed all criminal charges against 12 members of the U.S. domestic terrorist group Weather Underground, including those against Bernardine Dohrn, Mark Rudd and Kathy Boudin.
- With the NCAA recognizing the unofficial champion of college football as the team that finished in first place in the Associated Press poll of sportswriters (as well as United Press International's poll of coaches), the Fighting Irish of Notre Dame finished in first place in the AP poll. Notre Dame, which finished 10–0–0 in regular play and defeated 11–0–0 Alabama in the Sugar Bowl, received 33 first place votes and 1,128 points overall to finish at number one, while Ohio State (10–0–1) had 11 first place votes and 1,002 points. The UPI poll, taken before the 1973 bowl games, had declared Alabama the national champion in December.

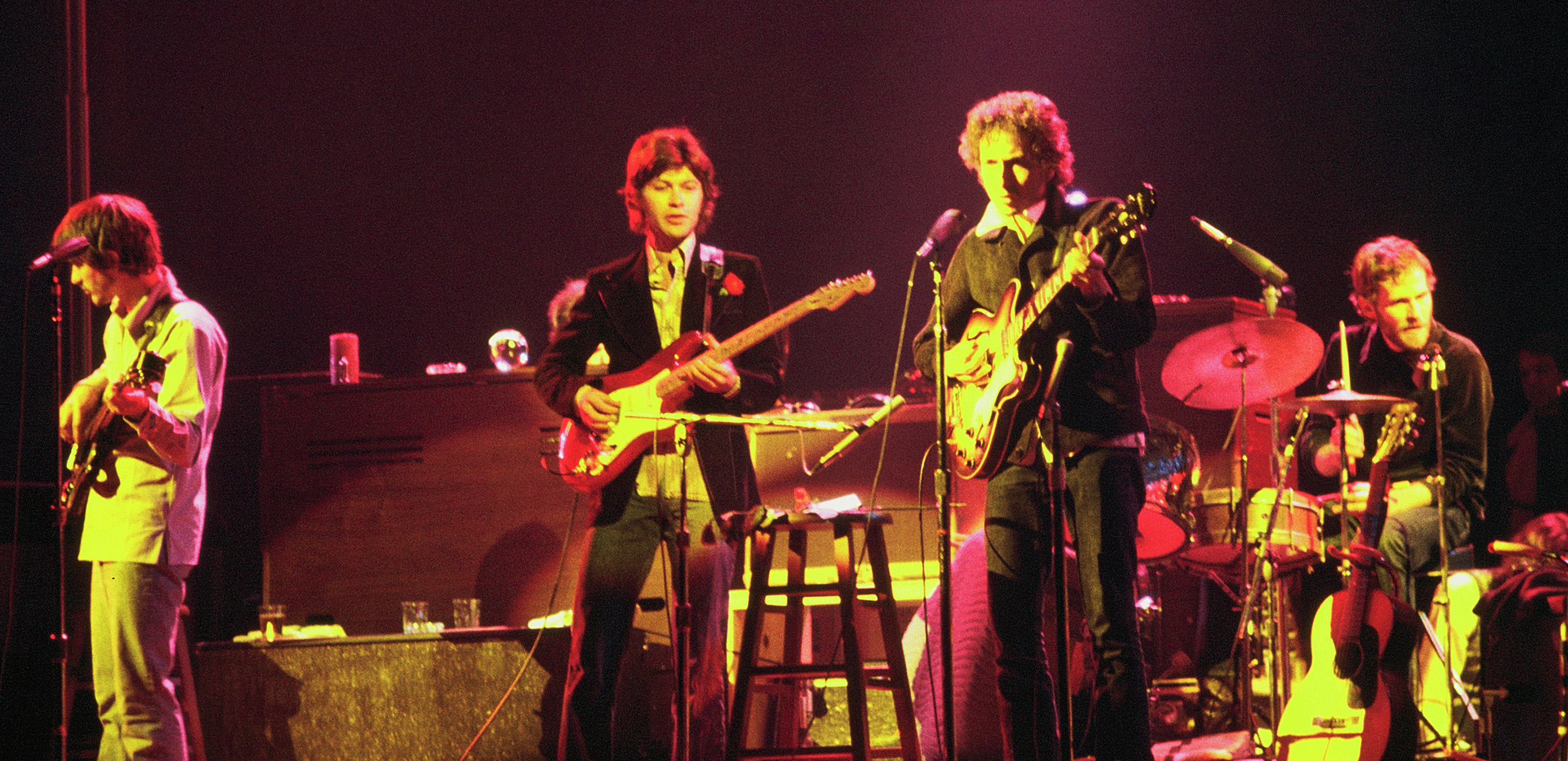
Bob Dylan and The Band

- Bob Dylan and The Band began their 40-date North American tour with a concert at The Chicago Stadium. It was Dylan's first formal tour since 1966 and served to relaunch his career for the remainder of the 1970s and the decades to come.
- Born:
  - Davide Ancilotto, Italian professional basketball player who died of a brain ischemia during a preseason game; in Mestre, Venice (d. 1997)
  - MV Bill (stage name for Alexandre Pereira), Brazilian rapper, actor and songwriter; in Rio de Janeiro
  - Mike Ireland, Canadian speed skater and Olympia, 2001 world sprint champion; in Winnipeg
  - Alessandro Petacchi, Italian road racing cyclist; in La Spezia
  - Franck Riester, French Minister of Culture, 2020 to 2022; in Paris
  - Francisco Rivera Ordóñez, Spanish bullfighter; in Madrid
  - Pablo Thiam, Guinean footballer with 31 appearances for the national team and a 14-season career in Germany's Bundesliga from 1994 to 2008; in Conakry
  - Hayley Yelling, English long-distance runner and European cross country champion, 2004 and 2009; in Dorchester, Dorset
  - Faat Zakirov, Russian cyclist, winner of the 2001 Tour of Slovenia; in Andijan, Uzbek Soviet Socialist Republic, Soviet Union
- Died:
  - Gino Cervi, 72, Italian comedian, stage, film and TV actor known as the star of the RAI series Le inchieste del commissario Maigret ("The Investigations of Commissioner Maigret") from 1964 to 1972
  - Arthur Daley, 69, American sportswriter for The New York Times, 1956 Pulitzer Prize winner
  - Maksim Shtraukh, 73, Soviet film and theater actor, known for portraying Vladimir Lenin in six movies, including as the star of Lenin in Poland in 1966

== January 4, 1974 (Friday) ==
- By a vote of 427 to 374, the Ulster Unionist Council in Northern Ireland voted to reject the Sunningdale Agreement that had been signed between the United Kingdom and the Republic of Ireland to establish a revival of the Northern Ireland Assembly and an advisory Council of Ireland with representatives from both Northern Ireland and the Republic.
- Citing executive privilege, U.S. President Richard Nixon refused to surrender over 500 tape recordings that had been subpoenaed by the Senate Watergate Committee.
- In Mahlabatini in South Africa, Harry Schwarz, the white opposition leader of the Transvaal province parliament, and Mangosuthu Buthelezi, the black Chief Executive Councillor of KwaZulu, signed the Mahlabatini Declaration of Faith.
- American serial killer Ted Bundy attacked his first victim, University of Washington student Karen Sparks, by invading her apartment, then bludgeoning her with a medal rod and assaulting her. Sparks survived the attack but was left permanently disabled.
- Born:
  - Sindi Dlathu, South African actress and musician; in Meadowlands, Gauteng Province
  - Armin Zöggeler, Italian Olympic luge champion, 2002 and 2006 Winter Olympics gold medalist; in Merano, South Tyrol
- Died:
  - Abdul Ghafoor Breshna, 66, Afghan painter, composer, poet and film director
  - Renzo Videsott, 69, Italian conservationist, founder of the Movimento Italiano per la Protezione della Natura
  - Ellef Mohn, 79, Norwegian footballer

== January 5, 1974 (Saturday) ==
- The sinking of a ferry boat in the Philippines killed 82 people, when the ship capsized in a storm off the coast of Cebu island's Bagacay Point while on its way back from Christmas holidays in Baybay town in Leyte province. The bodies of 37 people were recovered and another 45 were missing.
- The Worli riots began in the chawl of the Worli neighborhood of Bombay when the police attempted to disperse a rally of the Dalit Panthers that had turned violent.
- Born:
  - Vardan Minasyan, Armenian footballer and manager who coached the Armenia national team 2009 to 2013 and 2018; in Yerevan, Armenian Soviet Socialist Republic, Soviet Union
  - Vladimir Loginov, Kazakhstani footballer with 23 caps for the Kazakhstan national team; in Oral, Kazakh Soviet Socialist Republic, Soviet Union
- Died:
  - Vincent Starrett, 87, Canadian-born American writer and columnist known for the novel The Private Life of Sherlock Holmes and for the Walter Ghost mysteries
  - J. Pius Barbour, 79, American Baptist pastor, died of gastroenteritis following a cerebral hemorrhage.
  - Denis William Brogan, 73, Scottish author and historian
  - Tay Hohoff (Therese von Hohoff Torrey), 75, American author and literary editor (J. B. Lippincott & Co.)
  - Lev Oborin, 66, Soviet pianist and music educator

== January 6, 1974 (Sunday) ==
- The Global Television Network became Canada's third English-language television network (after CTV and CBC) when it began broadcasting in Toronto and southern Ontario.
- In response to the oil crisis, at 2 a.m. the United States began a trial period of year-round daylight saving time for the first time since World War II. The change had been enacted by the U.S. Congress and was intended to run through 2 a.m. on April 27, 1975. Clocks which had been set back an hour across the U.S., less than three months earlier, were set ahead an hour. The act would later be amended to return to standard time for four months from October 1974 to February 1975.
- The crash of Air East Flight 317 killed 12 of the 17 people aboard. The flight crashed on approach to Johnstown, Pennsylvania, after having departed 35 minutes earlier from Pittsburgh. The Beechcraft 99A turboprop made a premature descent and clipped a bank of elevated approach lights, then slammed into a steep embankment 100 yards (91 m) from Runway 33. The Federal Aviation Administration would shut down the Air East commuter airline two months later.
- CBS Radio Mystery Theater, hosted by E. G. Marshall, premiered on 218 stations affiliated with the CBS Radio Network, in an attempt to revive radio dramas that had been popular in the U.S. prior to the introduction of television. The show would last for eight seasons until going off the air on February 1, 1982. The first episode, "The Old Ones Are Hard to Kill", starred film and TV star Agnes Moorehead.
- Born:
  - Paolo Camossi, Italian Olympic triple jump athlete and 2001 World Champion; in Gorizia
  - Barry Williams, Welsh rugby union player for the Wales national team 1996–2002, and for the British Lions in 1997; in Carmarthen
  - Elisa Miniati, Italian footballer for the women's national team; in Rome
  - Romain Sardou, French novelist; in Boulogne-Billancourt, Hauts-de-Seine département
- Died:
  - Pyotr Nikiforov, 91, Russian revolutionary who served as the Premier of the Far Eastern Republic in 1921, later a Soviet government official
  - David Alfaro Siqueiros, 77, Mexican painter and muralist
  - Sister Margit Slachta, 89, Hungarian social activist and politician who founded the Sisters of Social Service in 1923; recognized in 1985 as one of the Righteous Among the Nations

== January 7, 1974 (Monday) ==
- Gasoline rationing began in Sweden, with private vehicles limited to only 100 liters (26 U.S. gallons) of gas for the 53 days between January 7 and February 28, as Sweden became the first Western European nation to begin rationing.
- Former Northern Ireland Prime Minister Brian Faulkner resigned as the leader of the Ulster Unionist Party in the wake of the Party's January 4 rejection of the Sunningdale Agreement.
- Bora Laskin was sworn in as the 14th Chief Justice of Canada to replace the retiring Gérald Fauteux. In appointing Laskin, Prime Minister Pierre Trudeau broke with tradition by passing over the more senior justice, Ronald Martland.
- The "Gombe Chimpanzee War" broke out in Tanzania's Gombe Stream National Park between two groups of Eastern chimpanzees (Pan troglodytes schweinfurthii) that primatologist Jane Goodall had studied since 1960. A group of eight male primates, dubbed by Goodall as the Kahama community, had broken away from the Kasakela chimpanzee community. Eight Kasakela males attacked and killed the Kahama male "Godi", beginning a four-year-long "war" between the two groups.
- Born:
  - Varun Badola, Indian TV actor and comedian known as the star of Yeh Hai Mumbai Meri Jaan, and as the male lead of the soap opera Astitva...Ek Prem Kahani; in New Delhi
  - Julen Guerrero, Spanish footballer for 14 seasons with Athletic Bilbao and 41 appearances for the Spain national team; in Portugalete, Biscay province
  - İbrahim Kutluay, Turkish basketball player who was the top scorer in the EuroLague (1999), the Turkish League (1999) and the Greek Cup finals (2001); in Yalova
  - Vance McAllister, controversial U.S. Congressman for Louisiana; in Oak Grove, Louisiana
  - Joseph L. Erb, U.S. and Cherokee Nation filmmaker and computer animator; in Gore, Oklahoma
- Died:
  - Charles Coulson, 63, British applied mathematician and theoretical chemist known for the Coulson–Fischer theory and the Chirgwin–Coulson weights measurement of valence bond, as well as other applications of molecular physics to valence bond theory.
  - General Wang Shusheng, 69, Vice Minister of National Defense for the People's Republic of China
  - Paul Methuen, Baron Methuen RA, 87, English painter and zoologist. The lizard Methuen's dwarf gecko (Lygodactylus methueni) is named in his honor, and he is known for his identification of the frog genus Gephyromantis, as well as the Karoo dwarf chameleon (Bradypodion karrooicum) and for Standing's day gecko (Phelsuma standingi).
  - Margaret Q. Adams, 99, the first woman to serve as a deputy sheriff in the United States, sworn in to the Los Angeles County Sheriff's Department in 1912 and retiring in 1947.
  - Marvin Glass, 59, American toy designer, died of complications from a stroke

== January 8, 1974 (Tuesday) ==
- In response to increasing demands by protesters for more freedom, South Korea's President Park Chung Hee issued an emergency decree making it illegal "to deny, oppose, misrepresent, or defame" the president's decisions, as well as prohibiting the reporting of news of dissent "through broadcasting, reporting or publishing, or by any other means." The South Korean press immediately ceased reporting on protests. Persons violating the decree were subject to arrest without a warrant and to trial by a military court, punishable by a maximum of 15 years in prison.
- Delegates to a meeting of the National Collegiate Athletic Association (NCAA) made a major change in the rules of amateur athletics, amending the NCAA rules to allow athletes to receive money to play as professionals in one sport and to play at the college level in other sports. The resolution, requiring two-thirds approval, passed by four votes, 258 to 123.
- Born:
  - Kamla Abou Zekry, Egyptian TV and film director known for her 2004 romantic comedy Sana Oula Nasb ("The First Year of Deception"); in Cairo
  - Nicholas White, South African racing cyclist who won the 2007–2008 UCI Africa Tour; in Johannesburg, Gauteng, South Africa
- Died: Lizette Hermant Sarnoff, 79, French-born widow of David Sarnoff

== January 9, 1974 (Wednesday) ==
- Representatives of the 12 member nations of the Organization of Petroleum Exporting Countries (OPEC) concluded their three-day meeting in Switzerland at Geneva and voted for a three-month freeze on oil prices. Saudi Arabia had been willing to reduce crude oil prices but faced opposition from Algeria, Iraq and Iran.
- In Colombia, all 32 people aboard a SATENA airlines flight were killed when the Hawker Siddeley HS-748 crashed into Gabinete Mountain shortly after departing Florencia as part of a multistop flight from Bucaramanga to Bogotá.
- The Soviet Writers' Union expelled novelist Lydia Chukovskaya after she had come to the defense of dissident physicist Andrei D. Sakharov, virtually preventing her from having future works published.

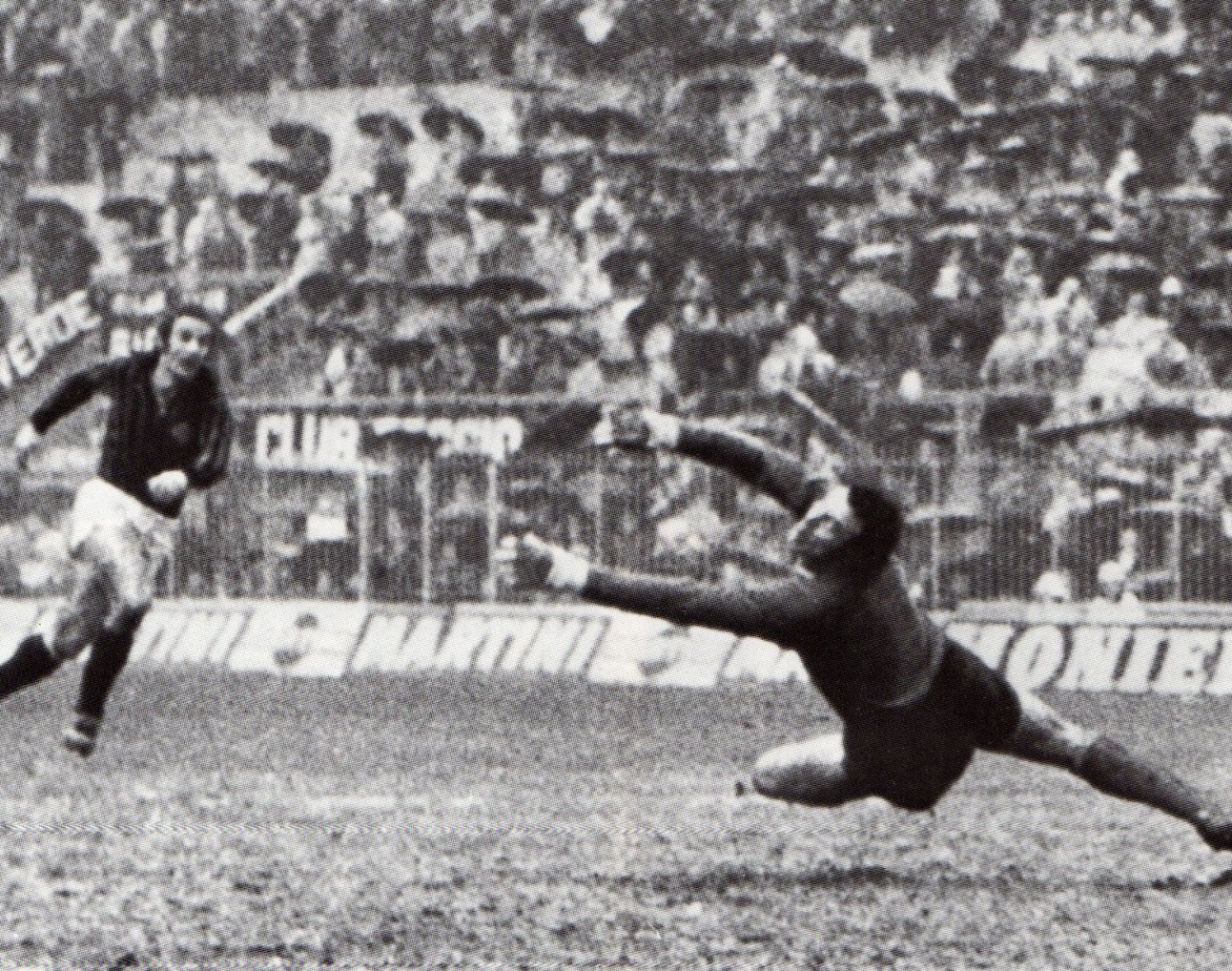
Milan striker Luciano Chiarugi and Ajax goalkeeper Heinz Stuy in the first leg of the 1973 European Super Cup

- In the first leg of the two-game 1973 European Super Cup series, played at San Siro in Milan, Italy, A.C. Milan defeated Ajax Amsterdam by a score of 1–0. The second leg took place one week later at Olympic Stadium in Amsterdam, with the outcome determined by the aggregate of the two scores, with Ajax effectively winning 35 minutes into the match with the second of six goals.
- Mrs. Noah Greenberg, president of the board of the New York Pro Musica ensemble, announced that the group would disband at the end of its current season, with its final performance scheduled for May 16.
- In the U.S. state of Michigan, state Senator Charles N. Youngblood Jr. resigned after his conviction for conspiracy to bribe a public official over a liquor license for a supermarket chain.
- Born:
  - Farhan Akhtar, Indian actor, screenwriter, producer and director known for Dil Chahta Hai (as writer, 2001) ("What the Heart Desires"); Rock On!! (as director, 2008); and Zindagi Na Milegi Dobara ("You Only Live Once") (as producer, 2011); in Bombay
  - Nicole Johnson, Miss America 1999 and the first Miss America with diabetes, now an activist for the American Diabetes Association; in St. Petersburg, Florida
  - Stevie Crawford, Scottish footballer and manager, with 25 caps as striker for the Scotland national team; in Dunfermline, Fife
  - Sávio (born Sávio Bortolini Pimentel), Brazilian footballer, with 21 caps for the Brazil national team; in Vila Velha, Espírito Santo state
  - Darren Debono, Maltese footballer, with 56 caps for the Malta national team
  - Wangay Dorji, Bhutanese footballer, with 15 caps for the Bhutan national team; in Thimphu
  - Jesulín de Ubrique (born Jesús Janeiro Bazán), Spanish bullfighter; in Ubrique, Province of Cádiz
  - Omari Hardwick, American actor, poet, rapper and producer known for Dark Blue, Being Mary Jane, and Army of the Dead; in Savannah, Georgia
  - Ramón Nomar, popular Venezuelan-born Spanish pornographic actor; in Caracas
- Died: Frank E. McKinney, 69, American businessman, chairman of the Democratic National Committee 1951-1952

== January 10, 1974 (Thursday) ==
- Étienne Eyadéma, President of the Togolese Republic in west Africa, announced the nationalization of the nation's phosphate mining industry and of the privately owned Compagnie Togolaise des Mines du Bénin. Two weeks later, his presidential plane would crash on landing near Sarakawa, an incident that Eyadéma believed was an assassination attempt by saboteurs paid by company shareholders.
- The crew of Skylab 4 was granted a day off. Edward Gibson spent most of the day conducting solar observations using the station's coronagraph, while Gerald Carr and William Pogue relaxed.
- As part of its Operation Arbor nuclear test series at the Nevada Test Site, the U.S. carried out three simultaneous nuclear explosions at the same site.
- In Los Mochis, Sinaloa in Mexico, the Universidad Autónoma de Occidente (UdeO) was established as the Centro de Estudios Superiores de Occidente (CESO).
- Joe Remiro, a co-founder of the Symbionese Liberation Army U.S. terrorist group, was arrested along with Russell Little on suspicion of committing the November 6 murder of Marcus Foster, the superintendent of public schools in Oakland, California. Remiro would be sentenced to life imprisonment for the murder, while Little's conviction would be overturned in 1981.
- In solidarity with the protest by engineering school students at the University of Ahmedabad in India, university students of the Navnirman Andolan movement called for a bandh, leading to a violent two-day riot in Ahmedabad and Vadodara, and police firing on the crowd.
- Born:
  - Hrithik Roshan, Indian film and TV actor known as star of the sci-fi film Koi... Mil Gaya and in the title role of the superhero film Krrish film series, and as a judge on TV's Just Dance; in Bombay
  - Kelly Marcel, British screenwriter of the film Fifty Shades of Grey; in London
  - Jemaine Clement, New Zealand actor, musician and comedian known for Flight of the Conchords; in Masterton
  - Steve Marlet, French footballer with 23 caps for the France national team; in Pithiviers, Loiret département
  - Johan Botha, South African Olympic middle-distance runner; 1999 champion in the 800 metre race; in Pretoria
  - Beata Sokołowska-Kulesza, Polish Olympic sprint canoer, 1999 world champion in the women's K-2 500 metres; in Gorzów Wielkopolski, Lubusz Voivodeship
  - Onyok Velasco (born Mansueto Velasco Jr.), Filipino Olympic boxer; in Bago, Negros Occidental, Philippines
- Died:
  - Martin Scherber, 66, German composer
  - Eddie Safranski, 55, American jazz double bassist, composer and arranger, died from undisclosed causes.
  - Richard F. Cleveland, 76, American lawyer, son of U.S. President Grover Cleveland, known as investigator for the Alger Hiss case

== January 11, 1974 (Friday) ==
- The first surviving sextuplets in recorded human history— David, Elizabeth, Emma, Grant, Jason and Nicolette Rosenkowitz— were born in South Africa to 25-year-old Susan Rosenkowitz at the Mowbray Maternity Hospital in Cape Town.
- On the Tunisian island of Djerba, Tunisia's President Habib Bourguiba and Libya's President Muammar Gaddafi signed the Djerba Declaration, committing Tunisia and Libya to a merger as the Arab Islamic Republic. The two presidents announced the next day, January 12, 1974, that referendums would take place in each country on January 18, 1974, to vote on the issue. The scheduled vote was soon cancelled after Tunisia's Foreign Minister Mohammed Masmoudi was fired on January 14. The vote was later postponed to March 20, then was never held at all.
- Investigative reporter Tad Szulc revealed that the U.S. Central Intelligence Agency (CIA) had spent six months in 1964 and 1965 to finance a plot to assassinate Cuba's premier Fidel Castro and then to invade Cuba. Szulc's article was published five days later in Esquire magazine.
- Born:
  - Giuseppe Filianoti, Italian opera lyric tenor; in Reggio Calabria
  - Kim Chambers, American pornographic actress; in Fullerton, California
  - Jens Nowotny, German footballer with 48 caps for the German national team; in Malsch, Baden-Württemberg state, West Germany
  - Xiong Ni, Chinese diver and Olympian, three-time gold medalist from the 1996 and 2000 games; in Changsha, Hunan province
- Died:
  - Antonio Bautista, 36, Philippine Air Force pilot who was also a member of the Blue Diamonds and Sabres aerial demonstration teams, was shot down over Jolo Island while providing support for government troops against rebels. The Antonio Bautista Air Base, located on Palawan near Puerto Princesa, is named in his honor.
  - Margit Barnay, 77, German silent film actress
  - Tony Lama, 86, American boot manufacturer
  - Clotilde von Derp (born Clotilde Margarete Anna Edle von der Planitz), 81, German expressionist dancer
  - Ted Poston, 67, African-American journalist and author

== January 12, 1974 (Saturday) ==
- The Ethiopian Revolution began as rank-and-file soldiers of the Negele Borana garrison of the Fourth Brigade of the Ethiopian Ground Forces mutinied over bad food and the lack of drinking water. The mutineers seized Lieutenant General Deresse Dubale, Emperor Haile Selassie's personal envoy, and forced him to eat and drink as they did for a week.
- Gasoline rationing began in the Netherlands, as residents were limited to 60 liters (less than 16 U.S. gallons) of gasoline for a month. The Dutch government ended the rationing eight days early, ending on February 4.
- Stephanie Britton, 57, and her 4-year-old grandson, Christopher Martin, were stabbed to death at their home on Hadley Green Road in the London Borough of Barnet. As of 2019 the case remained unsolved, although serial killer Patrick Mackay was a suspect.
- Television was introduced in the African nation of Tanzania as TVZ (Television Zanzibar) was inaugurated in a ceremony by Zanzibar's President Aboud Jumbe.
- Felix Díaz Ortega founded the right-wing Nuevo Orden political party in Venezuela.
- The Pro Football Hall of Fame elected four new inductees, who would be enshrined on July 27: From the Chicago Bears, Bill George, Cleveland Browns long-time placekicker Lou Groza, Detroit Lions interception master Night Train Lane and Green Bay Packers running back Tony Canadeo.
- Born:
  - Melanie C (stage name for Melanie Jayne Chisholm), English singer-songwriter for the Spice Girls; in Whiston, Merseyside, England
  - Hámilton Ricard, Colombian footballer with 27 caps for the Colombia national team; in Quibdó, Chocó Department
  - Eri Irianto, Indonesian footballer with 16 caps for the national team; in Sidoarjo Regency, East Java (died of a heart attack during a match, 2000)
  - Ivica Mornar, Croatian footballer with 22 caps for the Croatian national team; in Split, Socialist Republic of Croatia, Socialist Federal Republic of Yugoslavia
  - Milen Petkov, Bulgarian footballer with 37 caps for the Bulgaria national team; in General Toshevo, Dobrich Province
  - Tor Arne Hetland, Norwegian Olympic cross-country skier and 2002 gold medalist; in Stavanger, Norway
  - Nina Proll, Austrian film and TV actress; in Vienna
  - Aaron Seltzer, Canadian filmmaker and screenwriter and partner with Jason Friedberg; in Mississauga, Ontario
  - Séverine Vandenhende, French Olympic judo champion, 2000 Olympic gold medalist; in Dechy, Nord département
- Died:
  - Nunzio Malasomma, 79, Italian film director and screenwriter known for 41 Italian and German films from 1923 to 1968, including the popular Italian comedy Il Diavolo in convento and melodrama Quattro rose rosse, and the German dramas Die fromme Lüge and Die Nacht der Entscheidung
  - "Indian Jack" Jacobs, 54, American and Muscogee Nation native, NFL and Canadian Football League quarterback and halfback, 1952 Most Outstanding Player for the WIFU, died of a heart attack.
  - Chris Mackintosh, 70, Scottish all-around athlete who played rugby union for the Scotland national team, as well competing in the long jump finals in the 1924 Summer Olympics and the 1938 world championship in the bobsled competition
  - Lady Patricia Ramsay, 87, granddaughter of Queen Victoria, who renounced her royal title of Princess Patricia of Connaught in 1919 in order to marry a commoner

== January 13, 1974 (Sunday) ==
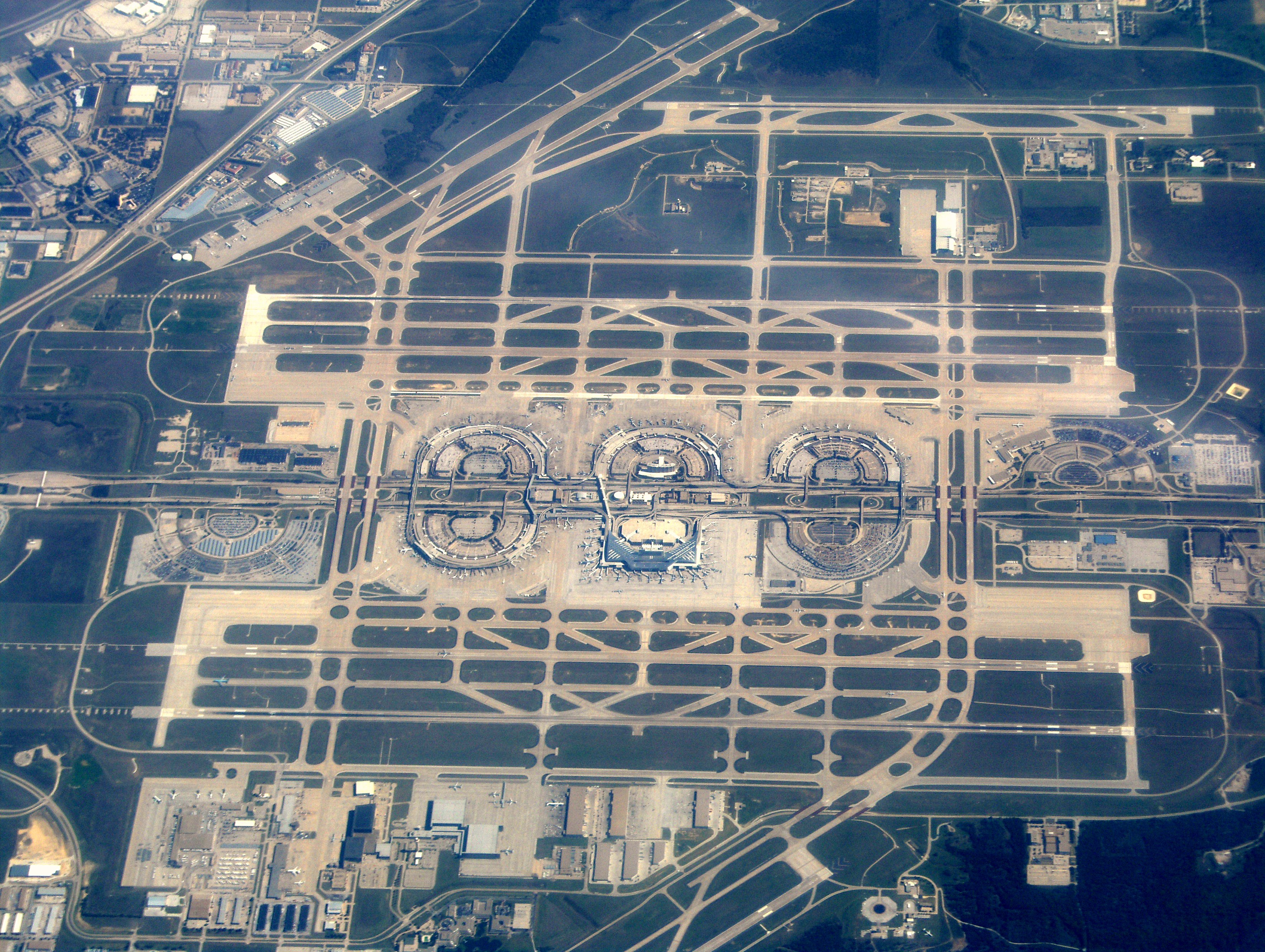
DFW

- Dallas-Fort Worth Regional Airport (DFW), which would become the second-busiest in the world for passenger service, opened in the U.S. state of Texas for scheduled flights. The first flight to land was a Boeing 727 arriving from Memphis, Tennessee. American Airlines Flight 293 to Los Angeles became DFW's first departure several hours later. Operated by the cities of Dallas and Fort Worth, the airport occupies 27 square miles (70 km^{2}) of land in Dallas County and Tarrant County.
- Heinrich Lipphardt, a German businessman who had been held prisoner in since 1953 by the Communist government of the People's Republic of China, was set free and allowed to cross into British Hong Kong at the Lowu border crossing. Lipphardt, who had operated a business in northern China before the 1949 Chinese Revolution, had been sentenced to life imprisonment for spying.
- With the island of Grenada to become independent on February 7, Queen Elizabeth II dismissed the British Governor, Dame Hilda Bynoe, from office at the request of Prime Minister Eric Gairy. Gairy's predecessor, Herbert Blaize, had appointed Dame Hilda.

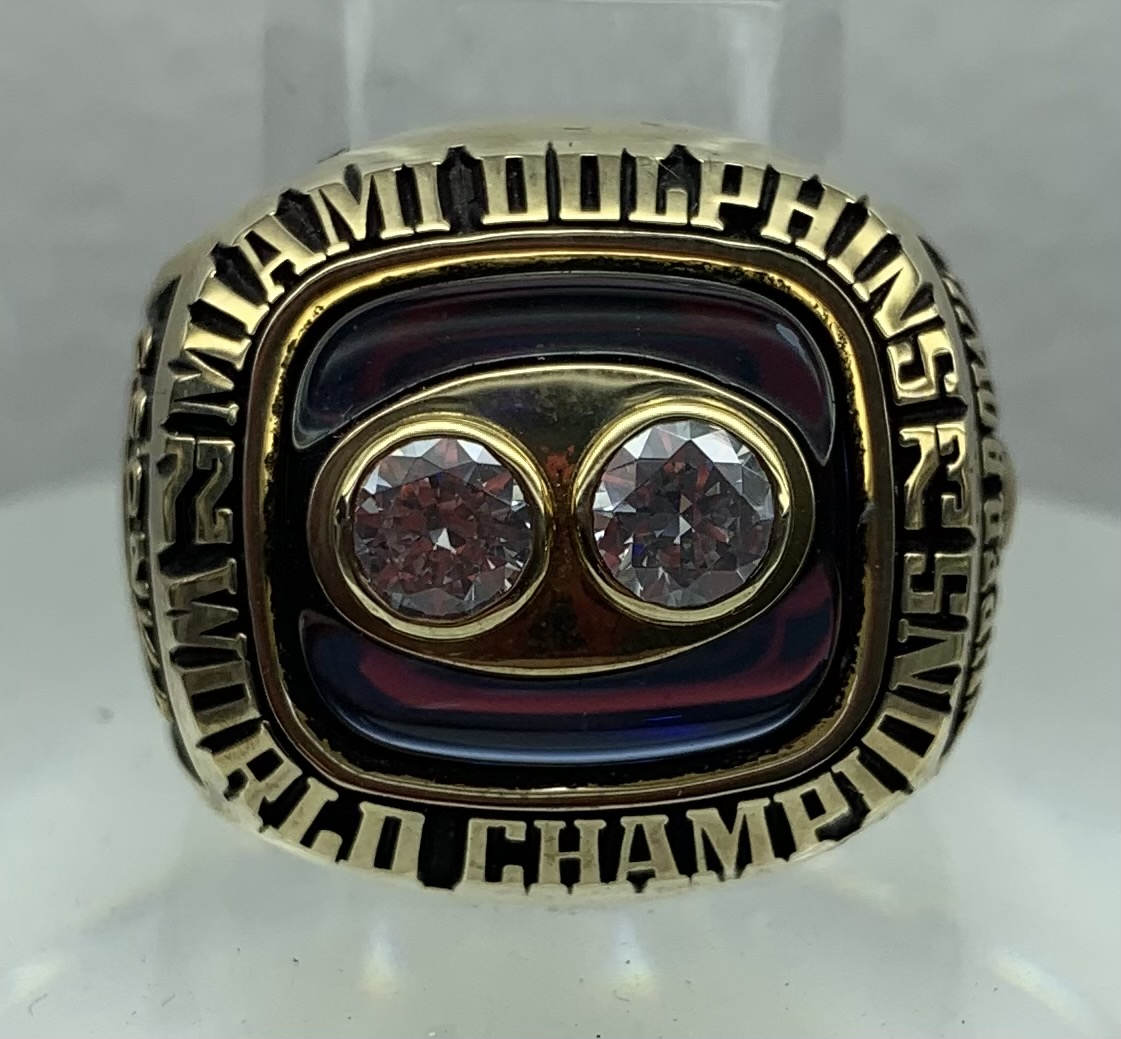
A Miami Dolphins Super Bowl VIII ring

- In Super Bowl VIII, held at Rice Stadium in Houston, Texas, the American Football Conference (AFC) champion Miami Dolphins retained their title as National Football League champions, defeating the National Football Conference (NFC) champion Minnesota Vikings by a score of 24–7.
- New Zealand racing driver Denny Hulme won the 1974 Argentine Grand Prix at Autodromo Municipal Ciudad de Buenos Aires, Argentina.
- Born:
  - Sergei Brylin, Russian ice hockey player for HC CSKA Moscow in the USSR and Russia, and for 16 seasons with the NHL New Jersey Devils; in Moscow, Soviet Union
  - Mary Jo Sanders, female U.S. professional boxer with 25 wins and one loss; in Detroit
  - Jason Sasser, American pro basketball player in the NBA, scoring champion 1998 in the minor league Continental Basketball Association; in Denton, Texas
- Died:
  - Raoul Jobin, 67, French Canadian operatic tenor
  - Dr. Arthur Arndt, 80, Jewish German physician who survived the Holocaust (along with six members of his family) despite being in Berlin during World War II, after being helped to hide in the Nazi German capital. Arndt's wife Lina, who was born July 22, 1886, in Prussia, Germany, died on December 14, 1980. Arthur Arndt's story was profiled in the book Survival in the Shadows: Seven Jews Hidden in Hitler’s Berlin, by Barbara Lovenheim (Open Road Integrated Media, 2002).
  - Salvador Novo, 69, Mexican author and television presenter, official chronicler of Mexico City
  - Mohammad Iqbal Shedai, 85, Pakistani activist and Pan-Islamist who campaigned for Muslim independence and the partition of British India.

== January 14, 1974 (Monday) ==
- Jules Léger was sworn in as the 21st Governor General of Canada, succeeding the retiring Roland Michener.
- Born:
  - Nancy Johnson, U.S. Olympic champion sport shooter; in Phenix City, Alabama
  - Fabiana Luperini, Italian cyclist, 5-time winner of the Giro Donne (formerly the Giro d'Italia Femminile); in Pontedera
  - Rastislav Michalík, Slovak footballer with 21 caps for the Slovia national team; in Staškov, Czechoslovakia
  - Stavroula Kozompoli, Greek Olympic water polo player and top scorer in the 2004 Women's Water Polo World League; in Athens
- Died:
  - Östen Undén, 87, longtime Minister for Foreign Affairs for Sweden, 1945 to 1962, and acting Prime Minister of Sweden for six days in 1946
  - Günther Niethammer, 65, German ornithologist and Waffen-SS member, profiled in the 2008 novel Die Vogelwelt von Auschwitz; the Niethammeriodes genus of moth and at least seven subspecies of birds have been named for him.
  - Hugo Stoltzenberg, 90, German chemical warfare engineer
  - Joseph Dippolito, 59, underboss of the Los Angeles crime family within the American Mafia; Dippolito was stricken with a heart attack two days earlier at his daughter's wedding.

== January 15, 1974 (Tuesday) ==
- A panel of technical experts testified that the 18½-minute gap in the tape recording of President Nixon's conversation with H. R. Haldeman on June 20, 1972, was made by someone pushing the record-erase button at least five times and as many as nine times. White House attorney James D. St. Clair objected to all questions about whether the erasure was deliberate.
- The first of the 10 "BTK Murders" took place in the U.S. city of Wichita, Kansas, as a security alarm installer, Dennis Rader, strangled a family of four people, two of them children. Rader would kill three more victims in the 1970s, then resume the murders in 1985, and would taunt the Wichita police before finally being arrested in 2005.
- The Malari incident took place in Jakarta, capital of Indonesia, as thousands of students protested against a state visit by Japan's Prime Minister Kakuei Tanaka. The riot then turned into an attack on Chinese Indonesians in the suburb of Glodok. Indonesian security forces intervened, and at least 11 people were killed, 137 injured, and 700 arrested. The mob burned 144 buildings in and around Jakarta.
- The Brazilian Congress voted, 400 to 76, to elect General Ernesto Geisel over rival candidate Ulysses Guimarães as President of Brazil, but not before opposition members halted the proceedings three times with protests.
- A school bus-type vehicle carrying farm workers fell into a drainage canal southwest of Blythe, California and near Ripley, California at approximately 6:30 a.m. PST, before sunrise, killing 19 people and injuring 28.
- Comet Kohoutek, discovered from Earth on March 18, 1973, and predicted to be even brighter than Halley's Comet, made its closest approach to Earth, coming no closer than 0.8 astronomical units or 74,000,000 miles (119,000,000 km), and being barely visible to the naked eye.
- A Japanese company, Sato Foods Industries Co., Ltd., received U.S. patent No. 3,786,159 for a process for manufacturing alcohol powder.
- The three astronauts on the third crewed U.S. space mission to Skylab set a new world record for time spent in space, breaking the mark of 59 days, 11 hours set by the previous crew on its mission from July 28 to September 25, 1973. Launched on November 16, 1973, the new Skylab astronauts reached 60 days in space later in the day, and would complete 84 days, 1 hour and 12 minutes in space upon their return on February 8.
- Actor John Wayne visited Cambridge, Massachusetts, at the invitation of The Harvard Lampoon, to debate students and promote his new film, McQ. Wayne rode through Harvard Square from the Lampoon Castle to the Harvard Square Theatre in an armored personnel carrier from Fort Devens, confronted on the way by Native Americans expressing support for the protesters on trial for the Wounded Knee Occupation. At the debate, Wayne claimed not to be able to hear a question about his participation in enforcing the Hollywood blacklist.

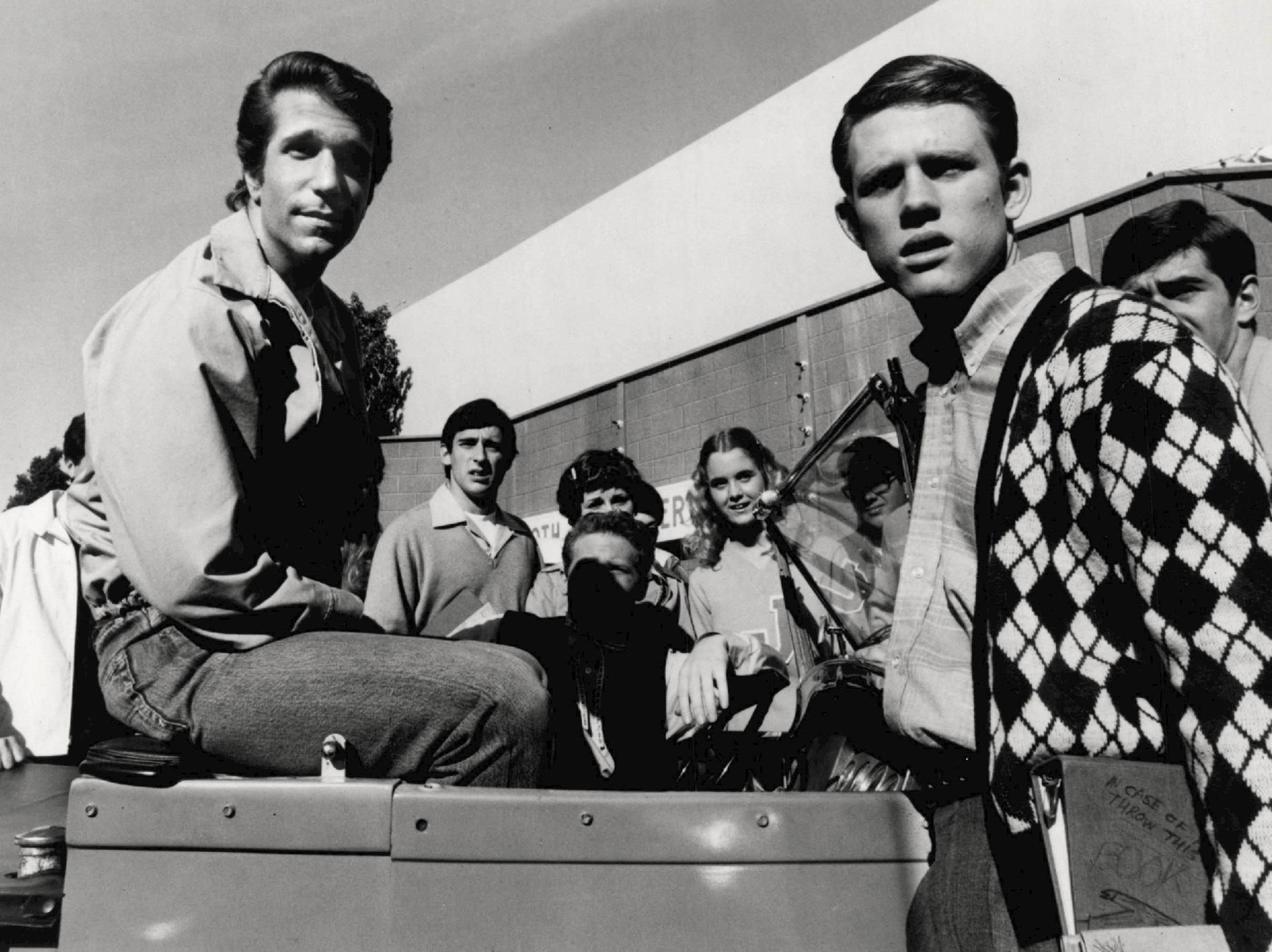
Happy Days stars Ron Howard (right) and Henry Winkler (left)

- The U.S. TV sitcom Happy Days debuted on ABC. After switching in 1975 to being filmed in front of a live audience, Happy Days would reach number one in the Nielsen ratings in the United States. Critic reaction was mixed, with Jay Sharbutt of the Associated Press writing, "It is a half-hour comedy series. It is set in the 1950s. It is awful," but adding that it "does a pretty fair job of recapturing the atmosphere of the era," and Kay Gardella of New York's Daily News commenting that as a midseason replacement, "some of the new arrivals are worse than the shows that were dropped."
- The Knight Street Bridge opened, joining Vancouver and Richmond, British Columbia.
- Born: Adam Ledwoń, Polish footballer with 18 caps for the Poland National Team; in Olesno (committed suicide 2008)
- Died:
  - Josef Smrkovský, 62, Czechoslovak politician who had led the reforms of the Prague Spring of 1968 and was later punished, died of cancer.
  - Charles Rosher, A.S.C., 88, English-born cinematographer
  - Yosef Serlin, 67, Israeli Minister of Health, 1952 to 1955, and Zionist activist, lawyer and member of the Knesset

== January 16, 1974 (Wednesday) ==
- The murders of Barbara McCulkin and her daughters Vicki and Leanne took place in Australia when the three disappeared from their home in Highgate Hill, Queensland. Their bodies would never be located. Garry Dubois and Vincent O'Dempsey would be found guilty of their kidnapping and murder more than 40 years after the crime was committed, in 2016 for Dubois and 2017 for Dempsey.
- In Norway, two Ocean Systems commercial divers died during a dive from the North Sea rig Drill Master, when the diving bell's drop weight was accidentally released, causing the bell to surface from a depth of 320 feet (98 m) with its bottom door open and drag the diver working outside through the water on his umbilical. The two divers, Per Skipnes and Robert John Smyth, both died from rapid decompression and drowning.

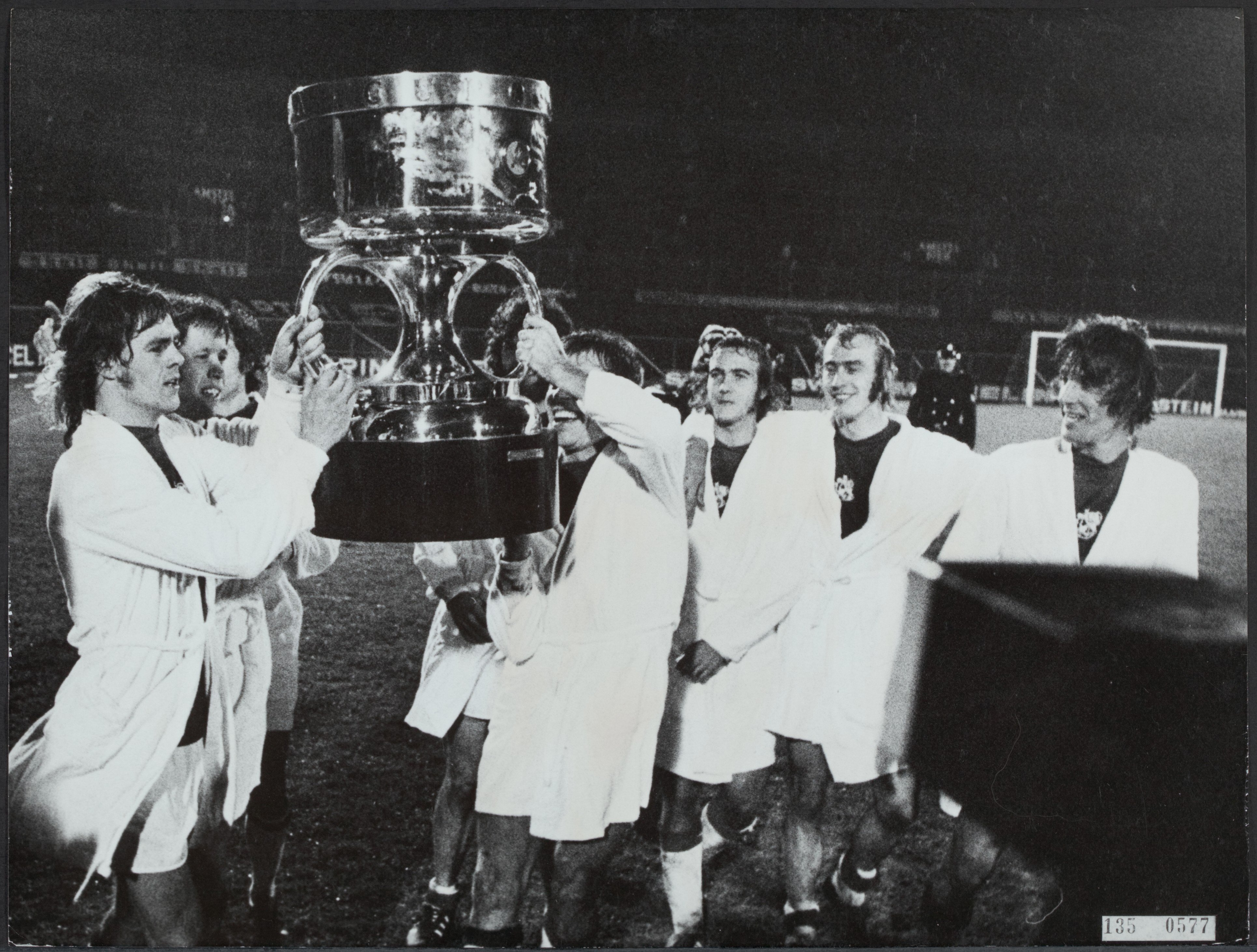
AFC Ajax wins the 1973 European Super Cup

- In the second leg of the 1973 European Super Cup, played at Olympic Stadium in Amsterdam, Netherlands, AFC Ajax defeated A.C. Milan by a score of 6–0, winning the Cup 6–1 on aggregate.
- All 18 crew of the British cargo transport MV Prosperity were killed after the craft's engine failed and the vessel was driven onto the La Conchée Reef near Guernsey and sank. Only 16 bodies were recovered.
- Born:
  - Kate Moss, English supermodel; in Croydon, Greater London, England
  - Brent Hinds, American musician, guitarist and vocalist for heavy metal band Mastodon; in Birmingham, Alabama (d. 2025)
  - Mattias Jonson, Swedish footballer with 57 caps for the Sweden national team; in Kumla Municipality
  - Tatiana Issa, Emmy Award winning Brazilian director and producer, 3-time Emmy Award winner; in São Paulo
  - Àngel Llàcer, Spanish Catalonian stage actor and singer, winner of three Butaca Awards for El Somni de Mozart (1998), Mein Kampf (1999) and The Full Monty (2001); in Barcelona
- Died:
  - Roy Bargy, 79, American composer and pianist
  - Johnny Barfield, 64, American country and old-time music performer
  - Fred A. Seaton, 64, U.S. Secretary of the Interior, 1954 to 1961

== January 17, 1974 (Thursday) ==
- The United Nations Security Council adopted Resolution 345, making Chinese the Council's fifth working language.
- A Cessnyca Airlines Douglas DC-3, designated HK-1216, crashed shortly after takeoff from Chigorodó in the Antioquia Department in Colombia, killing all 12 people on board. The 36-year-old airplane was on its way to Medellín.
- Led by Álvaro Fayad, guerrillas from the M-19 (Movimiento 19 de Abril) terrorist group in Colombia stole the battle sword that had been worn by Colombian hero Simon Bolivar in the 19th century, after invading the historic Quinta de Bolívar in Bogotá. Fayad left behind a note that said ""Bolívar, tu espada vuelve a la lucha." ("Bolivar, your sword returns to the battlefield.") The sword would be held for almost 17 years before its return by M-19 leader Antonio Navarro Wolff as part of the group's peace negotiations with the government.
- Pauline McGibbon of Ontario became the first female lieutenant governor of a Canadian province.
- Born:
  - Marco Antonio Barrera, Mexican boxer who held the world super bantamweight champion (WBO, 1995–1996 and 1998–2000), world featherweight champ (IBO 2001–2003), and world super featherweight champ (WBC 2004–2007); in Mexico City, D.F., Mexico
  - Annemarie Jacir, Palestinian independent filmmaker; in Bethlehem
  - Yang Chen, Chinese footballer with 35 caps for the China national team; in Beijing
  - Derrick Mason, NFL wide receiver, 2000 punt return yards leader; in Detroit, Michigan
- Died: Clara Edwards, 93, American singer, pianist and composer known for "By the Bend of the River"

== January 18, 1974 (Friday) ==
- The Israeli and Egyptian governments signed the Israel-Egypt Disengagement Treaty of 1974, ending conflict on the Egyptian front of the Yom Kippur War. The signing at Kilometer 101 was made by Lieutenant Generals Mohammed Gemasy of Egypt and David Elazar of Israel.
- Poland's news agency PAP announced that authorities had extinguished a coal mine fire that had been burning since 1933 in Silesia at the Polska Coal Company.
- Glenis Carruthers, a student teacher, was strangled to death on Clifton Down in Bristol, England, after leaving her 21st birthday party. As of 2010 the case remained unsolved.
- Born:
  - Marco Geisler, German Olympic rower, winner of four world championships (1999, 2001, 2002 and 2003); in Cottbus, East Germany
  - Tri Kusharjanto, Indonesian Olympic badminton player, 1995 World Cup mixed doubles title; in Yogyakarta
  - Steve Lomas, Northern Irish footballer with 47 caps for the Northern Ireland team; at a British Army base in Hanover, West Germany
  - Lieutenant Colonel Thibaut Vallette, French equestrian and part of the 4-member French team eventing gold medalists at the 2016 Summer Olympics; in Brest, Finistère département
  - Maulik Pancholy, American actor and author; in Dayton, Ohio
  - Princess Claire of Belgium (born Claire Louise Coombs); in Bath, Somerset, England
- Died:
  - Pete Appleton, 69, American Major League Baseball pitcher
  - Bill Finger, 59, American comic strip and comic book writer, co-creator (with Bob Kane) of Batman, was found dead in his apartment in New York City. An autopsy later concluded that he died of coronary arterial sclerosis.

== January 19, 1974 (Saturday) ==
- The Battle of the Paracel Islands between China and South Vietnam began. China conquered all of the islands in the Paracel archipelago the next day.
- The 88-game winning streak of the UCLA Bruins college basketball team ended when the Notre Dame Fighting Irish beat the visiting Bruins by one point, 71 to 70.
- French President Georges Pompidou floated the French franc for six months, abandoning intervention in money markets to maintain the franc's value. The change took effect when trading opened on Monday, January 20.
- Byron De La Beckwith was acquitted on federal firearms charges for bringing a live time bomb into New Orleans in his car in order to bomb the home of Anti-Defamation League regional director Adolph Botnick. De La Beckwith had previously been tried twice in Mississippi for the 1963 assassination of Medgar Evers, with both trials resulting in hung juries. De La Beckwith would be convicted of conspiracy to commit murder in the Botnick case on August 1, 1975. He would be convicted of Evers' murder in 1994 and sentenced to life in prison.
- In Woodbranch, Texas, a 22-year-old man was arrested after taking 13 people hostage during a supermarket robbery.
- Australian racing driver John McCormack won the 1974 New Zealand Grand Prix at Wigram Airfield Circuit, Christchurch, Canterbury, New Zealand. It was his second consecutive New Zealand Grand Prix victory.
- In the U.S. state of New Jersey, Essex County College set a collegiate record by scoring over 200 points in a basketball game, while its opponent, nearby Englewood Cliffs College, set a record by losing by 143 points. The final score was Essex County 210, Englewood Cliffs 67. Englewood Cliffs would close after its final graduation on June 7, 1974.
- Born:
  - Frank Caliendo, American comedian, actor and impressionist; in Chicago, Illinois
  - Walter Jones, NFL offensive tackle, 2014 enshrinee in the Pro Football Hall of Fame; in Aliceville, Alabama
  - Dainius Adomaitis, Lithuanian Olympic basketball player, twice coach of the year in the Lietuvos Krepšinio Lyga, Lithuania's pro basketball league; in Šakiai, Lithuanian SSR, Soviet Union
  - Jaime Moreno, Bolivian footballer with 75 caps for the Bolivia national team; in Santa Cruz de la Sierra, Bolivia
  - Badran Al-Shaqran, Jordanian footballer with 49 caps for the Jordan national team; in Ar-Ramtha
  - Natassia Malthe, Norwegian model and actress; in Oslo
- Died:
  - Antonio Fernós-Isern, 78, Puerto Rican cardiologist, Puerto Rico's non-voting representative in the U.S. Congress from 1946 to 1965
  - Wiktor Biegański, 81, Polish actor, film director and screenwriter
  - Edward Seago, 63, British artist
  - Leonard Shecter, 47, American sportswriter and editor (Ball Four), died of leukemia.

== January 20, 1974 (Sunday) ==
- For the first time in the history of English professional soccer football, a match in the English Football League was played on a Sunday. With a start moved to 11:30 in the morning to come before two other matches scheduled in the afternoon, Millwall defeated visiting Fulham, 1 to 0, in the League's Second Division. Striker Brian Clark of Millwall became the first English professional footballer to score a goal on a Sunday "when he drove the ball into the Fulham net at 11:34 a.m."
- Guerrillas of Argentina's People's Revolutionary Army, led by Enrique Gorriarán Merlo, completed their attack on the army base headquarters of the 10th Armored Cavalry Regiment in Azul in the Buenos Aires province. Mario Roberto Santucho organized the attack, in which base commander, Colonel Camilo Arturo Gay, and his wife Hilda Irma Casaux were killed, and Lieutenant Colonel Jorge Ibarzábal was taken hostage. Ibarzábal would be executed 10 months later. Later in the day, President of Argentina Juan Perón made a nationally televised speech in which he vowed "to annihilate as soon as possible this criminal terrorism".

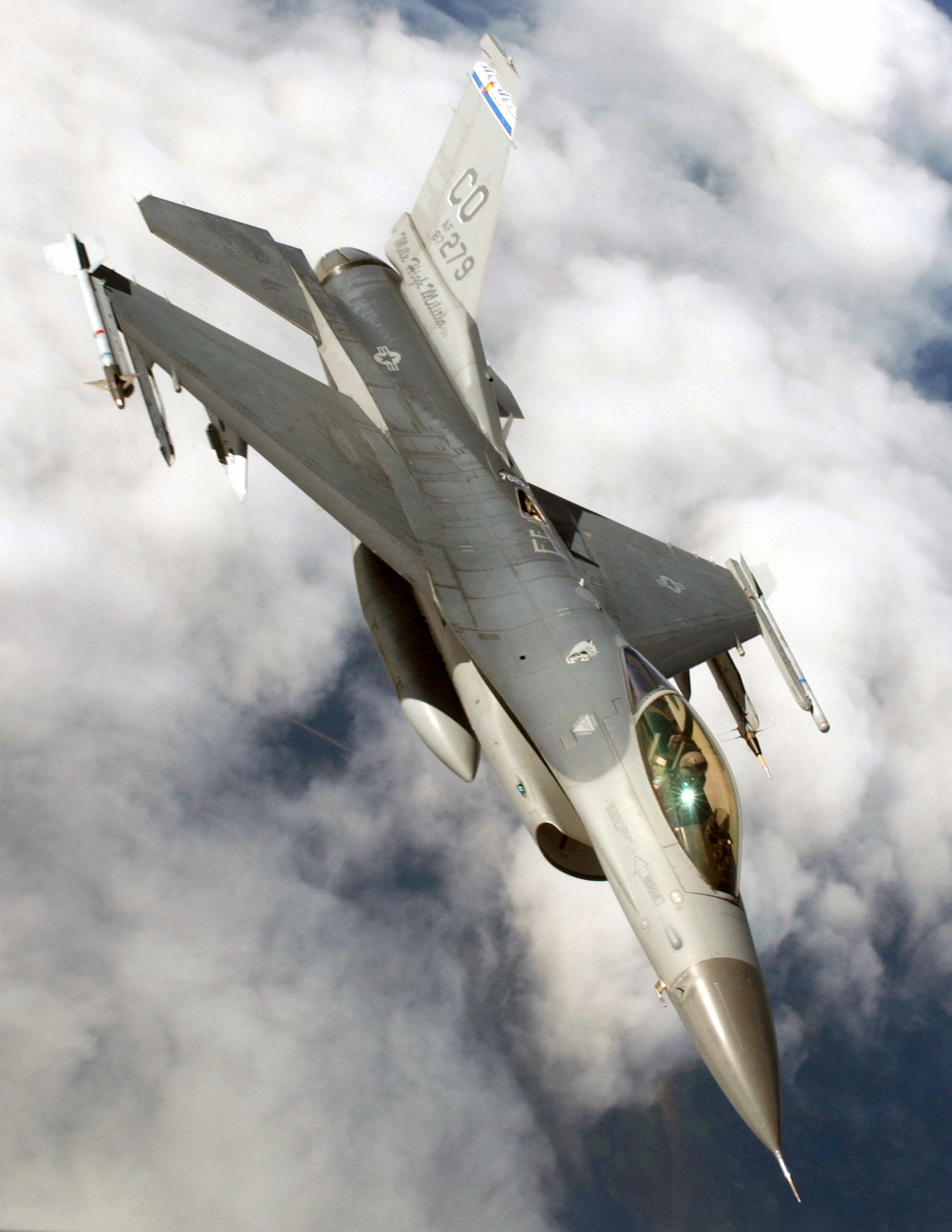
An F-16 Fighting Falcon in 2003

- The General Dynamics F-16 Fighting Falcon made an unplanned first flight after sustaining damage to its right horizontal stabilizer during high-speed ground tests at Edwards Air Force Base, California. While taxiing at 130 miles per hour (210 km/h), pilot Phil Oestricher nearly lost control of the aircraft when it entered a series of roll oscillations. Oestricher elected, "in the interest of safety and preventing further damage," to take the craft airborne to avoid crashing and remained in flight for six minutes. Oestricher would pilot the F-16's official first flight on February 2.
- In Pakistan, the fiery collision of a bus and an oil truck in Karachi burned 24 people to death and injured 50 others, as well as setting off a blaze that destroyed 42 shops and apartments.
- The Dutch oil tanker Kopionella rescued 23 South Vietnamese sailors who had survived the sinking of the warship Nhat Tao during the battle of the Paracel Islands. On the same day, Chinese troops took 47 Vietnamese soldiers and a U.S. advisor as prisoners of war, though the group would be released later.
- Born:
  - Rae Carruth, National Football League wide receiver who was later convicted of murder; as Rae Lamar Wiggins in Sacramento, California
  - Tengku Muhammad Fa-iz Petra, Crown Prince (Tengku Mahkota) of the Malaysian state of Kelantan; in Kota Bharu
  - Alvin Harrison and Calvin Harrison, U.S. Olympic track and field athletes and identical twins who won gold medals in the 4 × 400 m relay in 1996 and 2000, respectively; in Orlando, Florida
  - Komlan Assignon, Togolese footballer with 20 caps for the Togo national team; in Lomé
  - Valeria Parrella, Italian author, playwright and actress; in Torre del Greco, Province of Naples, Italy
- Died:
  - Leonard Freeman, 53, American television writer and producer, creator of Hawaii Five-O, died following heart surgery earlier in the day.
  - Paul S. Martin, 74, American anthropologist and archaeologist
  - Boris Balashov, 46, Soviet stamp collector, editor-in-chief of the Soviet magazine Filateliya SSSR
  - Edmund Blunden CBE MC, 77, English poet, author and critic who was nominated for the Nobel Prize in Literature six times
  - Harold Loeb, 82, American writer
  - Hermann Weyland, 85, German chemist and paleobotanist

== January 21, 1974 (Monday) ==
- Rescuers in Turkey saved 680 train passengers who had been stranded for almost two days by large snowdrifts that had immobilized the train cars in subzero weather. The train had departed Erzincan en route to Istanbul when it encountered a snowstorm near the village of Tekevler. During the night, temperatures had dropped to as low as −30 °C (−22 °F). Using flamethrowers to melt the snow, rescuers were able to get through after 44 hours and transport the passengers to aid stations at Elazig for medical treatment.
- On the third Skylab mission, astronaut Edward Gibson made the first filmed record of the birth of a solar flare, recording the 23-minute process from the moment that he observed a bright spot on the Sun through the Apollo Telescope Mount, and filming through the moment of its eruption.
- The United Kingdom ended its embargo against delivering weapons to the Middle East. Arms deliveries had been suspended immediately after the Yom Kippur War broke out on October 6. Foreign Secretary Alec Douglas-Home informed the House of Commons that deliveries would be carried out, including "the supply of small arms and helicopters to Egypt and some naval equipment and spare tank parts for Israel."
- Pakistan's second nuclear reactor, the PARR-II, became operational at the Pakistan Institute of Nuclear Science & Technology (PINSTECH), located in the Nilore section of Islamabad.
- In a 7–2 decision, the United States Supreme Court ruled in Cleveland Board of Education v. LaFleur that compulsory maternity leave for teachers, beginning a specified number of months before childbirth, was unconstitutional.
- Born:
  - Malena Alterio, Argentine-born Spanish TV actress and comedienne known for Aquí no hay quien viva; in Buenos Aires
  - Maxwell Atoms (stage name for Adam Maxwell Burton), American animator known for the Grim & Evil cartoon series and its more popular sequel, The Grim Adventures of Billy & Mandy; in Philadelphia
  - Kim Dotcom (born Kim Schmitz), German-born internet entrepreneur and computer hacker convicted of computer fraud, data espionage and embezzlement; in Kiel, West Germany
  - Robert Ghiz, Canadian politician and Premier of Prince Edward Island 2007 to 2015; in Charlottetown, Prince Edward Island
- Died:
  - Lewis Strauss, 77, Chairman of the U.S. Atomic Energy Commission, 1953 to 1958, after having been one of the AEC's founding members 1946–1950, and U.S. Secretary of Commerce 1958–1959, died of a lymphosarcoma.
  - Arnaud Denjoy, 90, French mathematician known for Denjoy's theorem on rotation number, and the Denjoy–Luzin theorem, Denjoy–Riesz theorem, Denjoy–Wolff theorem and the Denjoy–Koksma inequality
  - Hans Lauda, 77, Austrian industrialist who co-founded and served as the first President of the Federation of Austrian Industries (Die Industriellenvereinigung) from 1946 to 1960.
  - Everett Richard Cook, 79, American military officer, World War I flying ace and businessman
  - Sandy Griffiths (born Benjamin Mervyn Griffiths), 65, Welsh football referee in the 1950, 1954 and 1958 World Cup competitions
  - Robert Guy Howarth, 67, Australian scholar, literary critic and poet, died three weeks after he had been struck by a motorcycle in a pedestrian accident in Sydney.
  - Ken Viljoen, 63, South African cricketer with 27 Test matches between 1930 and 1949
  - Leon Volkov, 59, Soviet Air Forces defector and writer for Newsweek magazine, widower of Galina Talva, died of a heart attack.

== January 22, 1974 (Tuesday) ==
- President Suharto of Indonesia issued Decree No. 25/74, banning the import of foreign-made automobiles, and encouraging the sale of Indonesian-made pickup trucks and minibuses by exempting those vehicles from the luxury goods tax.
- The first annual "National March for Life" rally took place in Washington, D.C., on the steps of the U.S. Capitol on the one-year anniversary of the U.S. Supreme Court decision in Roe v. Wade, legalizing abortion nationwide. The rally was organized by activist Nellie Gray, who coined the term "pro-life". Police estimated the crowd to be more than 6,000 protestors.

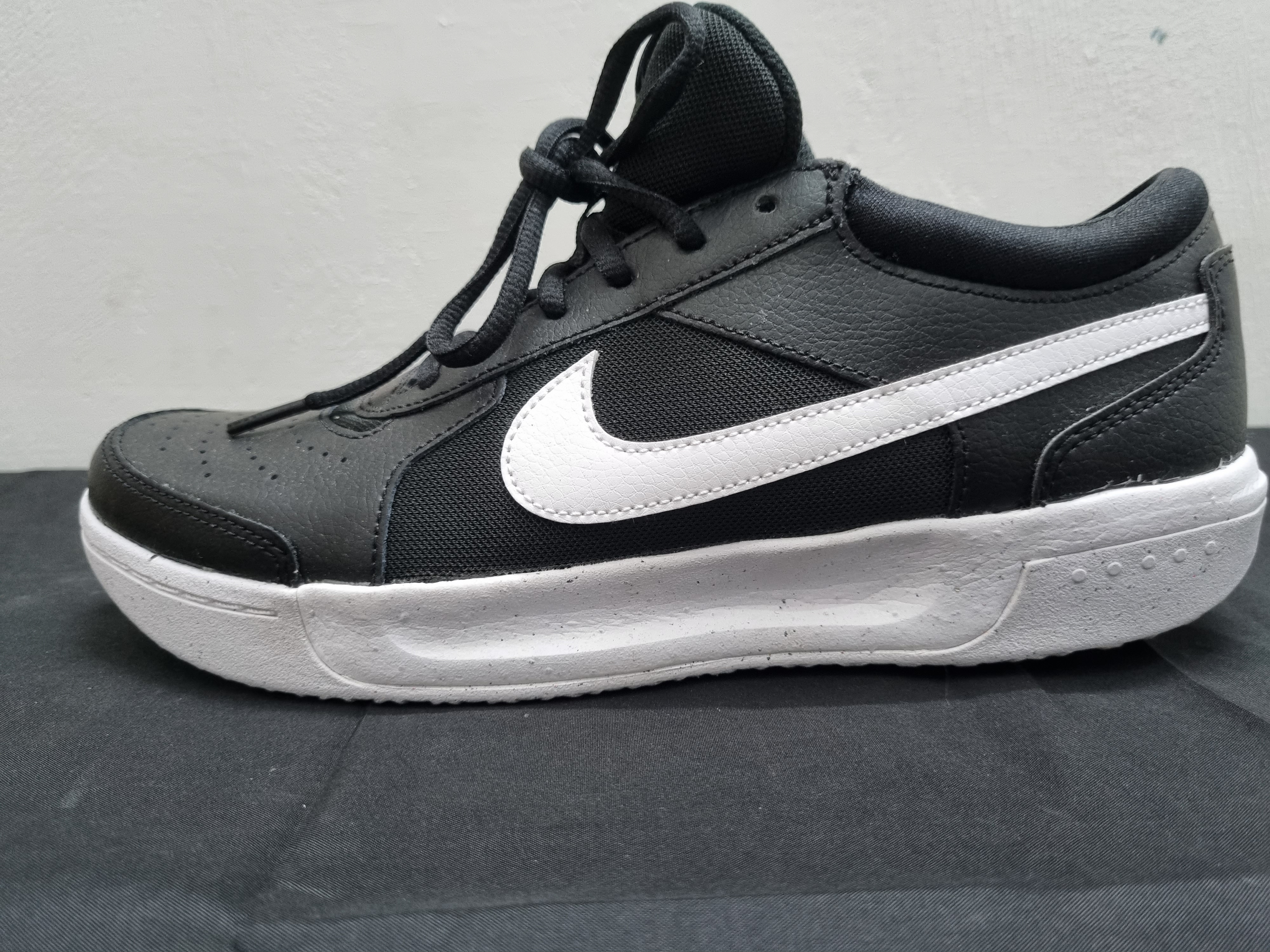
The Nike trademark

- Nike, Inc. was granted a U.S. trademark number 72414177 for its iconic logo, "The Swoosh", after having applied on January 31, 1972. Nike had first used the mark on its shoes on June 18, 1971.
- Born:
  - Tony DeBlois, blind American autistic savant and musician, profiled in the 1997 film Journey of the Heart; in El Paso, Texas.
  - Joseph Muscat, Prime Minister of Malta 2013–2020; in Pietà
  - Annette Frier, German actress and comedian; in Cologne, West Germany
  - Jörg Böhme, German footballer with 10 caps for the German national team as a midfielder and 16 seasons in the Bundesliga; in Hohenmölsen, East Germany
- Died: Antanas Sniečkus, 71, First Secretary of the Communist Party of Lithuania and the de facto leader of the Lithuanian Soviet Socialist Republic after overseeing the annexation of Lithuania to the Soviet Union

== January 23, 1974 (Wednesday) ==
- A fire killed 23 teenaged boys at the Heilig-Hartcollege (Sacred Heart School), a boarding school in Heusden, Belgium.
- Eight French Army soldiers were killed and three others seriously injured when the unit of 16 men took an unauthorized shortcut on a march through a 400-yard (370 m) long railway tunnel and was struck by a train. The group had lost its way during night maneuvers near Château-Thierry in France's département of Aisne.
- A small earthquake in the Berwyn range of mountains in North Wales coincided with atmospheric lights and was followed by reports of a UFO sighting in the village of Llandrillo in Denbighshire.
- Due to waning public interest in space exploration, the major American television networks announced that there would be no live coverage of the Skylab 4 splashdown the following month. This would be the first time since 1966 that the return of a crewed NASA spacecraft would not be broadcast live.
- Five days before their scheduled rematch fight, boxers Muhammad Ali and Joe Frazier were dressed in suits and being interviewed by Howard Cosell for Wide World of Sports when their trash talk resulted in an argument and a five-minute scuffle in the studio.
- An F-4C jet fighter crashed on the Gila Bend Gunnery Range in Gila Bend, Arizona, killing U.S. Air Force Maj. Jerry D. Whitlock and USAF Second Lieut. Jerry W. Smith.
- Born:
  - Norah O'Donnell, American TV journalist, and anchor for the CBS Evening News from 2019 to 2025; in Washington, D.C.
  - Tiffani Thiessen, American actress known for Saved by the Bell and for Alexa & Katie; in Long Beach, California
  - Joel Bouchard, Canadian ice hockey defenceman with 22 seasons in the NHL and 11 games for the Canada national team; in Montreal
  - Derek Cianfrance, American filmmaker known for Sound of Metal; in Lakewood, Colorado
  - Jack D. Fischer, U.S. Air Force test pilot and NASA astronaut; in Louisville, Colorado
  - Yuki Urushibara, Japanese manga artist; in Yamaguchi Prefecture
- Died: Athalia Ponsell Lindsley, 56, American model, dancer and activist, was murdered with a machete in front of her home in St. Augustine, Florida. The murder remains unsolved.

== January 24, 1974 (Thursday) ==
- A Togolese Air Force Douglas C-47 Skytrain carrying Étienne Eyadéma, the President of Togo, crashed near the village of Lama-Kara. Eyadéma falsely claimed that he was the sole survivor of the crash as a means to enhance his reputation. He subsequently changed his first name to "Gnassingbé" to commemorate the date of the crash.

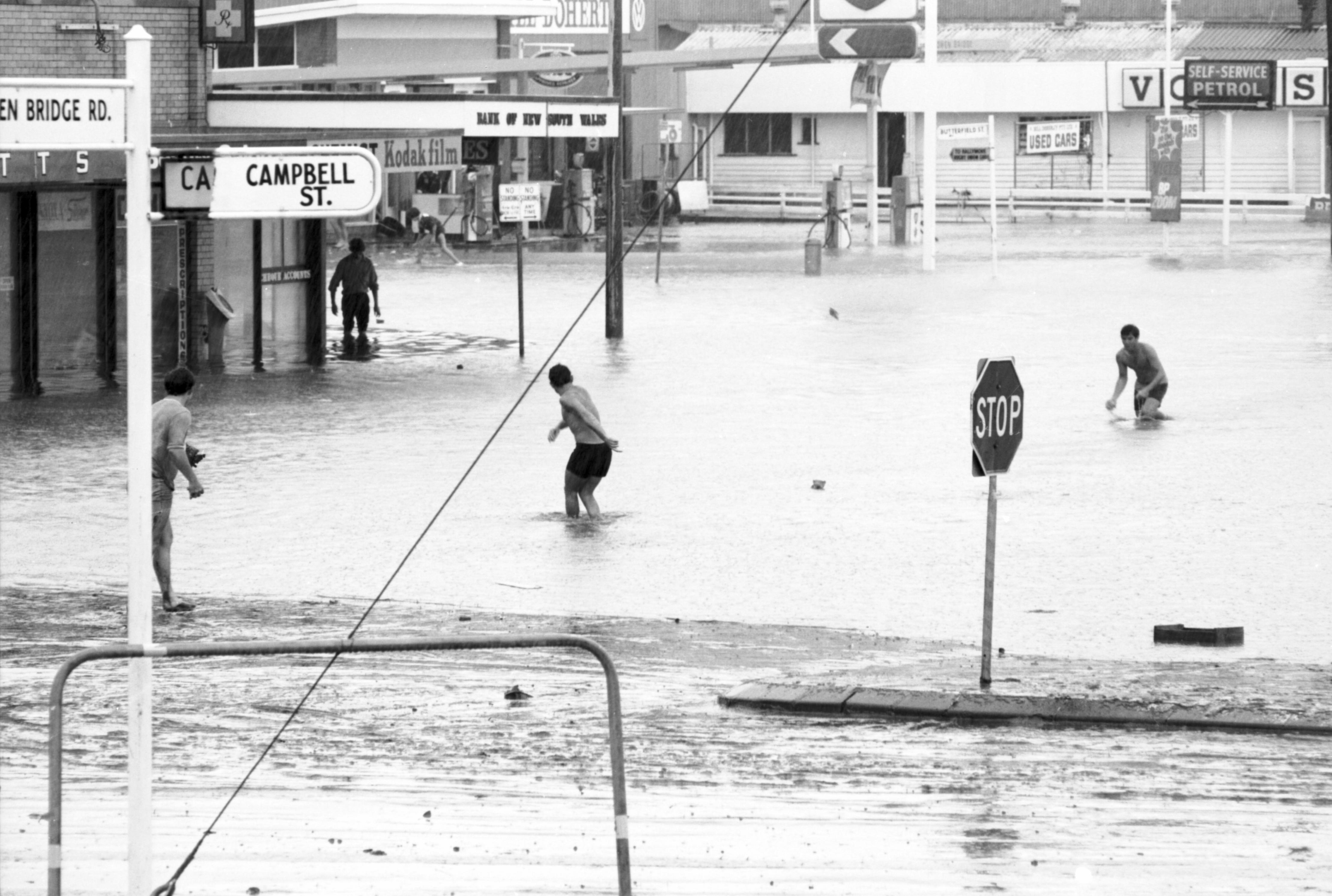
January 24–31, 1974: Brisbane flood

- Cyclone Wanda crossed into Australia's state of Queensland, Australia, bringing heavy rains and flooding of Brisbane, 16 deaths, 300 injuries and nearly AUD$980 million in damage.
- Prince Philip, Duke of Edinburgh, opened the 1974 British Commonwealth Games, known as "The Friendly Games", in Christchurch, New Zealand with athletes from 38 nations. The Games, which would be accompanied by the introduction of color television broadcasting to New Zealand, were telecast by the New Zealand Broadcasting Corporation (NZBC) and would continue until February 2.
- Four members of the Irish Republican Army hijacked a helicopter and used it to drop two milk churns packed with explosives onto Strabane Police Station in County Tyrone, Northern Ireland. One milk churn landed in a garden and failed to explode; the other landed in the River Mourne.
- Egil Krogh, a former aide to U.S. President Nixon and leader of the White House Plumbers, was sentenced to six months in prison. Krogh had authorized the September 1971 burglary of the office of Daniel Ellsberg's psychiatrist in Los Angeles.
- General Motors announced plans to lay off 75,000 hourly workers, 50,000 of them in Michigan, at 14 plants by March.
- Born:
  - Sarah Ruhl, American playwright and MacArthur Grant recipient known for Eurydice and The Clean House; in Wilmette, Illinois
  - Cyril Despres, French-born Andorran rally motorcyclist and 5-time winner of the time winner of the Paris—Dakar Rally; in Nemours, Seine-et-Marne département
  - Michaël Gillon, Belgian exoplanet astronomer and astrophysicist; in Liège
  - Tim Biakabutuka, Zairean/Congolese National Football League running back; in Kinshasa
  - Ed Helms, American TV and film actor and comedian known for The Office and for Rutherford Falls; in Atlanta, Georgia
  - Melissa Tkautz, Australian TV actress and pop music singer, known for E Street; in Sydney
- Died:
  - Major General Sir Hubert Rance, 75, British colonial administrator, the last Governor of British Burma (1946–1948), later the Governor of Trinidad and Tobago 1950-1955
  - Joe Savoldi, 65, Italian-born Office of Strategic Services agent, American football fullback, and professional wrestler
  - Andrew Dewar Gibb, 85, leader of the Scottish National Party, 1936–1940, independence advocate, barrister and prolific legal author
  - Major General Albert C. Smith, 79, Commander of the 14th Armored Division of the U.S. Army during World War II, later Chief of the Office of Military History

== January 25, 1974 (Friday) ==
- Yale University announced that the Vinland map, which purportedly showed the portion of North America explored by Leif Erikson in the 11th century, was a 20th-century forgery.
- The Soviet Union successfully tested its first multiple independently targetable reentry vehicle (MIRV) missile, the UR-100N, referred to by the Western alliance NATO as the SS-19 Stiletto intercontinental ballistic missile (ICBM). The first launch, and another one the next day, were fired from a site deep with the USSR and traveled to a test range 4,500 miles (7,200 km) away, about 850 miles (1,370 km) north of Midway Island in the Pacific Ocean. The U.S. Department of Defense disclosed the existence of the Soviet missile, which rivaled the older LGM-30G Minuteman III missile deployed by the U.S. since 1970.
- Simultaneous strikes began in 44 towns in the Gujarat state in India in conjunction with the Navnirman Andolan movement. Clashes with police took place in 33 cities. The riots caused by the rise in food prices would spread from Gujarat to Maharashtra, and then to Bihar in March. The Indian Army was called in to restore order on January 28 after rioting had killed 42 people in Ahmedabad.
- Israel Defense Forces troops began a full-scale withdrawal from the west bank of the Suez Canal. United Nations troops moved into the positions vacated by the IDF.
- Prime Minister Bülent Ecevit of Turkey formed a new coalition government between his Republican People's Party (CHP) and the National Salvation Party (MSP).
- U.S. Army Lieutenant Colonel Anthony Herbert filed a $44 million libel suit against CBS for portraying him as a liar in connection with his allegations about a military cover-up of Vietnam War atrocities.
- The U.S. Department of State announced that Gerald Emil Kosh, a civilian U.S. Department of Defense employee who had been captured on January 20 after the Chinese landing on Pattle Island during the Battle of the Paracel Islands, was being held by the People's Republic of China.
- In Minnesota, American actor Marlon Brando attended jury selection at the trial of American Indian Movement leaders Dennis Banks and Russell Means to show his support for the defendants, who had been indicted on charges related to the 1973 occupation of Wounded Knee.
- Born:
  - Adam Bousdoukos, German actor; in Hamburg, West Germany
  - Robert Budreau, Canadian filmmaker; in London, Ontario
  - Claudelle Deckert, German actress and model; in Düsseldorf, West Germany
  - Phill Jones, New Zealand Olympic and professional basketball player, 2009 MVP for the NZNBL; in Christchurch
  - Igor Miladinović, Serbian chess grandmaster; in Niš, SR Serbia Socialist Federal Republic of Yugoslavia
- Died:
  - William Fawcett (stage name for William Fawcett Thompson), 79, American character actor
  - Nora Holt, 89, American music critic, composer, singer and pianist, first African American to receive a master's degree in music in the United States
  - James Pope-Hennessy, 57, British biographer and historian, was beaten and stabbed to death in his West London apartment, in a midday attack by three men. Pope-Hennessy, known for "his disclosure of intimate royal secrets" in 1959 from the diary of Queen Mary, had been working on a biography of Noël Coward at the time of his murder. One of the killers said that the motive for the home invasion had been to search for a $150,000 advance that had been given to Pope-Hennessy for the Coward biography.

== January 26, 1974 (Saturday) ==
- The crash of Turkish Airlines Flight 301 killed 66 of the 73 people on board. The Fokker F28 Fellowship crashed and burned shortly after takeoff from Cumaovası Airport (now İzmir Adnan Menderes Airport) in İzmir.
- The Guðmundur and Geirfinnur case, widely considered a miscarriage of justice, began when an 18-year-old laborer, Guðmundur Einarsson, disappeared while walking home on a snowy night from a dance hall in Hafnarfjörður in Iceland.
- In Spokane, Washington, at least 175 employees of Pathology Associates Medical Laboratories, Inc. had food poisioning from the Shigella bacteria, after a company banquet at the Ridpath Hotel.
- At the 31st Golden Globe Awards, The Exorcist won the award for Best Drama, while American Graffiti won the award for Best Comedy or Musical.
- Born:
  - Lamia Abusedra, Libyan engineer, revolutionary, political advisor and diplomat; in Libya
  - Albert van den Berg, South African rugby union player with 51 caps for the Springboks, the South Africa national team; in Hoopstad
  - Rokia Traoré, award-winning Malian singer and songwriter; in Beledougou
- Died:
  - Boris Bychowsky, 65, Soviet scientist and parasitologist for whom the Bychowskicotylidae family of flatworms in fish are named, as well as four genera and numerous species.
  - Julius Patzak, 75, Austrian tenor

== January 27, 1974 (Sunday) ==
- Pope Paul VI canonized Teresa Jornet Ibars, a 19th-century Spanish nun, in a ceremony at St. Peter's Basilica.

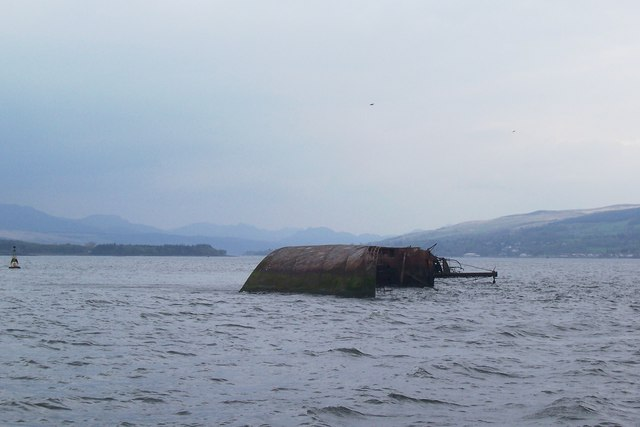
The wreck of Captayannis in 2006

- The cargo ship MV Captayannis ran aground on a sandbar in the Firth of Clyde, Scotland, after strong winds caused it to drag its anchor and drift into the anchor chains of the BP tanker British Light. All crew members were rescued. The ship would sink the following morning; its wreck remains in place in the River Clyde.
- Three days before the second anniversary of the Bloody Sunday massacre of 13 civilians by British troops, 4,000 people participated in a peaceful protest march, organized by the Provisional Irish Republican Army. The march through Derry in Northern Ireland followed the route of the 1972 march.
- The United States observed National MIA Awareness Day, proclaimed by President Nixon to mark the first anniversary of the Paris Peace Accords and to acknowledge Americans who had become missing in action in the Vietnam War.
- Rod Laver of Australia defeated Arthur Ashe of the U.S., 6–1, 6–4, 3–6, 6–4, to win the U.S. Professional Indoor tennis tournament in Philadelphia.
- Brazilian racing driver Emerson Fittipaldi won the 1974 Brazilian Grand Prix at Interlagos Circuit in São Paulo, Brazil.
- Born:
  - Ole Einar Bjørndalen, Norwegian biathlete, winter of eight Winter Olympics gold medals (including four in 2002) and 20 gold medals in world championships between 1998 and 2016; in Drammen
  - Chaminda Vaas, Sri Lankan cricketer with 153 matches for the national team; in Mattumagala (near Wattala)
  - Marco Malvaldi, Italian crime novelist known for the BarLume mystery series; in Pisa
  - Tim Harden, American track and field athlete, 2001 world indoor champion in the 60 metre dash; in Kansas City, Missouri

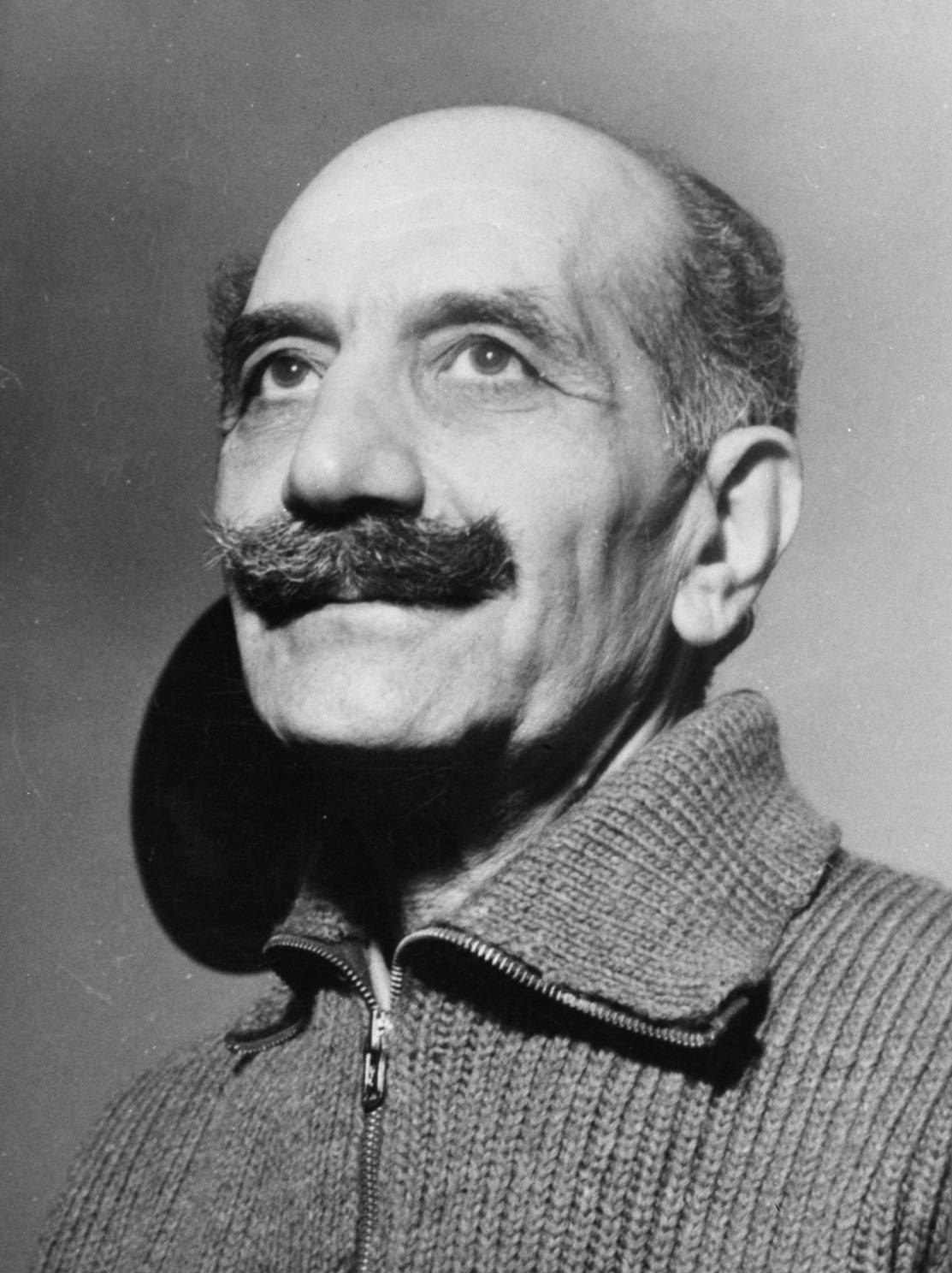
Grivas

- Died:
  - Georgios Grivas, 75, Greek Cypriot guerrilla leader who founded and led the EOKA-B paramilitary group, as well as Organisatos Chi and EOKA
  - Leo Geyr von Schweppenburg, 87, German general who commanded the 5th Panzer Army during World War II
  - Richard Gregg, 88, American social philosopher, advocate of passive resistance and the author of the 1934 treatise The Power of Non-Violence
  - Sir Edward Spears, 87, British Army major-general and Member of Parliament, liaison between the British and French Armies during World War One and World War Two

== January 28, 1974 (Monday) ==
- The siege by the Israeli Army of the city of Suez, in Egypt, ended at noon local time. Israeli troops withdrew, clearing the way for the 20,000 troops of the Egyptian 3rd Army to return home. The Egyptian troops had been trapped since October behind enemy lines on the east bank of the Suez Canal after having retaken part of the Sinai peninsula early in the Yom Kippur War.
- Indonesia's President Suharto took complete control of the Asian nation's internal security agency, ASPRI, dismissing the four Indonesian Army generals who operated the agency.
- The 1974 Federal Territory of Kuala Lumpur Agreement was signed, separating the Malaysian national capital, Kuala Lumpur, from the jurisdiction of the state of Selangor and placing the capital under the jurisdiction of the national government as a Federal Territory. The agreement was signed by the head of state of Malaysia, the Yang di-Pertuan Agong Tuanku Abdul Halim Muadzam Shah and by the Sultan of Selangor, Salahuddin Abdul Aziz ibni Almarhum.
- Bolivia's President Hugo Banzer placed the South American nation under a state of siege after a group of 12,000 peasants, some of whom were armed, had blocked roads near Cochabamba between the heavily populated cities of the north and the farmlands of the south and the east. The peasants had been protesting the doubling of the costs of basic staple foods. The rebellion was suppressed two days later and the nation's highways were reopened.
- A bus crash near the Peruvian town of Jauja drowned 35 people after the vehicle collided with another vehicle and fell into the Mantaro River. Only six people of the 41 on board survived.

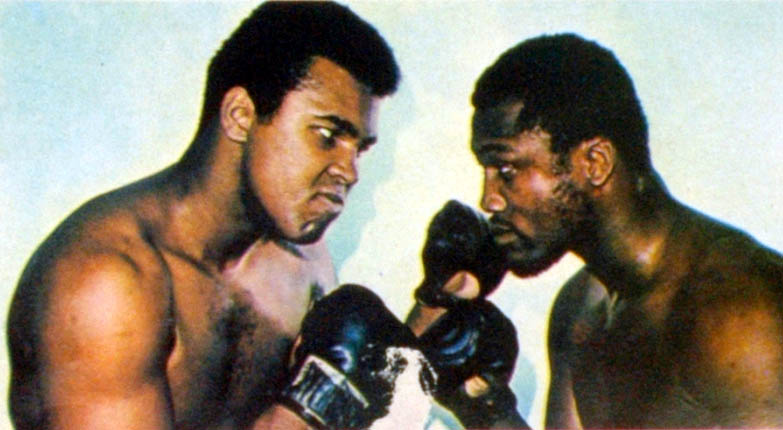
Promotional photo for Ali vs. Frazier II

- The rematch of former heavyweight boxing champions Muhammad Ali and Joe Frazier took place at Madison Square Garden in New York City. Ali won by unanimous decision after the fighters completed 12 rounds. What was described by one reporter as "the most ballyhooed non-title fight in history" was a reversal of Frazier's victory over Ali on March 8, 1971.
- An aircraft flying to Owatonna, Minnesota, for an inspection of law enforcement facilities crashed, killing all four on board. The Chief of Police of Thief River Falls was killed, along with two city council members and the pilot.
- Born:
  - Jermaine Dye, Major League Baseball right fielder, World Series MVP 2005; in Oakland, California
  - Magglio Ordóñez, Venezuelan Major League Baseball player, 2007 American League batting champion; in Caracas, Venezuela
  - Davana Medina, American figure competitor, IFBB champion 2003, 2004 and 2005; in Ponce, Puerto Rico
  - Ramsey Nasr, Dutch poet and actor; in Rotterdam
  - Kari Traa, Norwegian freestyle skier, 2002 Olympic gold medalist in the mogul skiing event; in Voss Municipality
- Died:
  - Ed Allen, 76, American jazz trumpeter and cornetist
  - Dillon Anderson, 67, American lawyer and former U.S. National Security Advisor to President Dwight Eisenhower, 1955 to 1956
  - Oswald Cornwallis, 79, English Royal Navy Captain and first-class cricketer

== January 29, 1974 (Tuesday) ==
- King Baudouin of Belgium dissolved the Belgian Federal Parliament after his choice of Prime Minister, Leo Tindemans, was unable to form a new government. Voting for all 212 seats of the Chamber of Deputies would take place on March 10, 1974.
- Born: Mălina Olinescu, Romanian singer; in Bucharest (died 2011)
- Died:
  - Kate Gardiner, 88, New Zealand mountaineer who made the first ascents of 33 mountains in the Canadian Rockies
  - Benjamin Steinberg, 58, American concert violinist, conductor and civil rights activist known for being co-founder (in 1965) of the Symphony of the New World, died of pancreatic cancer.
  - H. E. Bates CBE, 68, English author known for the Larkin Family series of books about rural Britons, and for My Uncle Silas
  - Jules Wabbes, 54, Belgian furniture designer and interior architect, died of cancer.

== January 30, 1974 (Wednesday) ==
- The crash of Pan Am Flight 806 killed 97 of the 101 people on board. The jet was making its approach to Pago Pago International Airport in American Samoa when a microburst-induced wind shear brought it down during its landing. The accident happened at 11:41 pm local time (1041 UTC on 31 January). Almost all the deaths were due to a fire that broke out after the crash.
- U.S. President Richard Nixon delivered the State of the Union Address to the 93rd United States Congress. Referring to what he described as "the so-called Watergate affair", Nixon said, "I believe the time has come to bring that investigation and the other investigations of this matter to an end. One year of Watergate is enough." Near the end of the speech, Nixon stated: "I want you to know that I have no intention whatever of ever walking away from the job that the people elected me to do for the people of the United States." Nixon would resign the presidency on August 9 after a tape recording showed that he had ordered a cover-up of the investigation of the Watergate scandal.
- Born:
  - Christian Bale, English film actor, 2011 Academy Award winner for Best Supporting Actor for The Fighter, Golden Globe Award winner for Best Actor for portraying former U.S. Vice President Dick Cheney in the film Vice; known also for portraying "Batman" in the "Dark Knight trilogy" 2005 to 2012; in Haverfordwest, Wales
  - Olivia Colman, English film and TV actress, Academy Award and BAFTA Award winner for Best Actress for The Favourite, Emmy and Golden Globe Award winner for portraying Queen Elizabeth II in The Crown; in Norwich, Norfolk
  - Roger Hammond, British bicycle racer, eight-time gold medalist in the British National Cyclo-cross Championships including five consecutive titles 2000 through 2004, as well as 1994, 2006 and 2008; in Oxford, Oxfordshire.
  - Gilber Caro, Venezuelan National Assembly deputy and political activist imprisoned multiple times by the Venezuelan government; in Caracas
  - Jemima Khan (pen name for Jemima Marcelle Goldsmith), British journalist; in Chelsea, London
  - Abdel-Zaher El-Saqqa, Egyptian footballer with 112 caps for the Egypt national team; in Dakahlia
  - Siluck Saysanasy, Laotian-born Canadian television actor in the Degrassi series in Degrassi Junior High and Degrassi High; in Vientiane
- Died:
  - Murray Chotiner, 64, American attorney and confidant of U.S. President Nixon, died of complications from injuries sustained a week earlier in a January 23 automobile accident. In September 1952, when Nixon was accused of wrongdoing as running mate of Dwight D. Eisenhower, Chotiner had destroyed a letter of resignation that Nixon had directed him to deliver. Instead, Chotiner advised Nixon to speak to the U.S. public on national TV. Nixon went on to be elected as Vice President of the United States.
  - Olav Roots, 63, Estonian conductor, pianist and composer
  - Bill Whitty, 87, Australian cricketer

== January 31, 1974 (Thursday) ==
- The People's Republic of China released Gerald Emil Kosh, a U.S. civilian captured during the Battle of the Paracel Islands.
- The South Vietnamese government and the Viet Cong announced that they would resume prisoner of war exchanges on February 8, after a suspension of seven months.
- A Pentagon spokesman announced that the United States Air Force was dropping charges against Capt. Donald Dawson, who had refused to fly a bombing mission over Cambodia after the signing of the Vietnam peace agreement. He was granted conscientious objector status and would be honorably discharged the following month.
- Two members of the Japanese Red Army (JRA) and two members of the Popular Front for the Liberation of Palestine (PFLP) made a failed attempt to blow up oil tanks at the Shell oil refinery complex on Pulau Bukom at Singapore. The terrorists then hijacked the ferry Laju and took its five crew members hostage.
- In Newtownabbey, County Antrim, a suburb north of Belfast, two armed robbers entered a workmen's hut and seized the week's wages of the 13 laborers inside. They then ordered the Protestants present to kneel on the floor. After two or three men did so, the gunmen opened fire on the other people in the hut, killing two Catholics (37-year-old Terence McCafferty and 29-year-old James McCloskey) and wounding three other men, including a Protestant. The gunmen were members of the Ulster Freedom Fighters.
- By a vote of 18 to 6, the United States House Committee on Education and Labor rejected an amendment to a school aid bill that would have prohibited the use of federal funds for desegregation busing.
- General Motors announced record profits of $2.4 billion for 1973. Delta Air Lines announced that its net profits for 1973 were $74.9 million, the highest earned to that date by an air carrier from ordinary operations in one calendar year.
- A 34-year-old woman in Littleton, Colorado committed suicide by carbon monoxide poisoning, but inadvertently killed her husband and three of her children, along with a resident of neighboring apartment. Betty Foster had started her car in the closed garage of her condominium building and a forced-air heating system sucked the fumes into two apartments.
- At a meeting in Scottsdale, Arizona, National League baseball team owners approved the sale of the San Diego Padres to Ray Kroc, the founder of the McDonald's chain of fast-food restaurants.
- Born:
  - Ariel Pestano, Cuban baseball player known as El Veterano, catcher for the gold medal-winning Cuba national team in the 2004 Summer Olympics and the 2001, 2003 and 2005 Baseball World Cup competitions; in Caibarién, Villa Clara Province
  - Anna Silk, Canadian actress and star of the TV series Lost Girl; in Fredericton, New Brunswick
  - Mike Waltz, U.S. National Security Advisor in 2025, politician, businessman, author, and former Army Special Forces officer; in Boynton Beach, Florida
- Died:
  - Samuel Goldwyn (born Szmuel Gelfisz), 94, Polish-born American film producer, co-founder of Goldwyn Pictures, which later merged with two other companies to form MGM Studios
  - Glenn Morris, 61, American Olympic athlete, winner of the 1936 Olympic decathlon, died of congestive heart failure.
  - Emil Väre, 88, Finnish wrestler, gold medalist in the 1912 and 1920 Summer Olympic games in lightweight wrestling, and in the 1911 World Wrestling Championships
  - Morris Kantor, 77, Russian-born American painter
  - Roger Pryor, 72, American radio and B-movie actor
