= Auguste Gehre =

Righteous of the nations who saved Jews during the Holocaust

- Born: Auguste Minna Liekfeldt; February 10, 1898; Altwarp, Germany
- Died: January 1, 1972 (aged 73); Glens Falls, New York, United States
- Resting place: Pine View Cemetery, Queensbury, New York
- Known for: Rescuing Jews during the Holocaust
- Spouse: Karl Max Otto Gehre
- Children: Ingeborg Gehre Smith
- Awards: Righteous Among the Nations (1988)

Auguste Gehre (February 10, 1898 – January 1, 1972) was a German woman who helped Jewish people during the Holocaust of World War II. She received the title Righteous Among the Nations on October 13, 1988.

== Personal life ==
Auguste Minna Liekfeldt was born on February 10, 1898, in Altwarp, Germany. Her mother was Ida Liechfiedt-Rach. She had three siblings, Erdmandine, Robert and Wilhelm who lived in Berlin. She married Karl Max Otto Gehre who was born on August 23, 1897, and they lived in Berlin in Kottbusser Ufer. They had a daughter who suffered with diphtheria and was treated by their family doctor Arthur Arndt. Their daughter, Ingeborg Gehre Smith, was the widow of Irving Smith. She died in 2008 in Glens Falls.

== World War II ==
Nazi Germans deported Jews to concentration camps during World War II, an effort that was in earnest after February 27, 1943, when Joseph Goebbels realized that there were still 4,000 Jews in Berlin that had not been picked up. He wrote in his diary, "[t]hey are now wandering about Berlin without homes, are not registered with police and are naturally quite a public danger. I ordered the police, the Wehrmacht and the Party to do everything possible to round these Jews up as quickly as possible."

The Gehres, who lived in a small apartment, brought Dr. Arndt into their home. Arndt was a decorated World War I veteran and an esteemed physician with a wife and two children. He stayed in their pantry and shared in the food that the family purchased with their food ration cards. Gehre also helped members of Arndt's family find places to live during the war. They helped provide food and shelter, as well as conceal the Jewish refugees. They were rare among the people of Berlin who were afraid of what would happen to them if they were caught helping Jews, and there were fewer people with homes after Berlin was bombed during the war.

Prior to the Gehre's, Arndt's children, Erich and Ruth, had been subject to forced labor by Nazi Germany in 1942. Erich heard that Jewish slave laborers were about to be sent to Auschwitz concentration camp by Joseph Goebbels. After extensive pleading, Dr. Arndt conceded to find a place to hide from the Nazis. Arndt was helped by Anni and Gustav Schulz of Neu Zittau, Brandenburg, a remote suburb of Berlin. In the 1920s, Anni was a governess to the Arndt's children and their housekeeper. She took in the Arndt's household items and the physician's medical instruments. At times, Arndt's wife Lina, described to her neighbors as a "lonesome friend", was taken in by Anni Schultz and her family. They grew vegetables and raised chickens that were used to feed the Schultz and Arndt family members who were spread out in the Berlin area. Max Kohler, a factory owner, took in Erich, a friend of his Bruno Gumpel (whose parents were sent to Auschwitz), and later Arndt's wife and daughter. Kohler said of the time "If the Germans are going to kill me for hiding one Jew, they might as well kill me for hiding six Jews." (Note: Ruth Arndt married Bruno Gumpel after the war.) Arthur Arndt and his family survived the war and his items stored at the Schulz home were returned to him.

Barbara Lovenheim, author of Survival in the Shadows about the Ardnt and Lewinsky families wrote,

How roughly 6,000 Jewish Germans managed to survive the atrocities of Nazism by living day to day in a shadowy underworld without identity cards, food ration books, secure accommodations, or money... this was a story of tremendous courage, resilience, and resourcefulness in the darkest days of Hitler's rule.

== After the war ==
The Gehres moved to the United States in 1948 and settled in Glens Falls, New York. Karl worked for the Glens Falls Insurance Company. Karl died on December 12, 1968, in Glens Falls. She died on January 1, 1972, in Glens Falls, New York. They were buried at the Pine View Cemetery in Queensbury, New York.

Karl and Auguste received the title Righteous Among the Nations on October 13, 1988. Gustav and Anni Schulz were also recognized as Righteous Among the Nations in 1988.

== Popular culture ==
- The Invisibles a documentary drama film about the struggle of Jews, like Ruth Arndt, and the people that helped them, including the Gehre family.
- Survival in the Shadows (2002), written by Barbara Lovenheim, tells the stories of survival of the Arndt and Lewinsky families during World War II.
