= Arthur Arndt =

German physician, Holocaust survivor

- Born: August 20, 1893; Germany
- Died: January 13, 1974 (aged 80); New York City, US
- Education: Friedrich-Wilhelms-Universitat
- Occupation: Physician
- Known for: Father and later father-in-law of the largest known group of Jews to survive by hiding in Germany during the Holocaust
- Spouse: Lina Arnoldi (m. 1921)
- Children: 2
- Military career
- Allegiance: German Empire
- Branch: Army Medical Service
- Service years: 1914–1918
- Conflicts: World War I
- Awards: Iron Cross; The Honour Cross of the World War 1914/1918
- Medical career
- Institutions: Charité

Arthur Arndt, M.D. (August 20, 1893 – January 13, 1974) was a German physician who went into hiding with his family in Berlin during the Holocaust. Arndt and his family received help from dozens of non-Jewish Germans, four of whom received the title Righteous Among the Nations in 1988. Barbara Lovenheim's book Survival in the Shadows: Seven Jews Hidden in Hitler’s Berlin tells the story of the physician's family and extended family as they hid during World War II. These seven people are the largest known group of Jews to survive by hiding in Germany.

After the war, Arndt and his family moved to the United States. His son and daughter and their spouses arrived on the first ship of Jewish refugees to arrive in the United States in May 1946. Arndt, who arrived with his wife Lina in December 1946, worked in a New York City hospital. In 1997, his daughter Ruth Arndt Gumpel and daughter-in-law Ellen Lewinsky Arndt were interviewed about their experiences during the war by the USC Shoah Foundation.

Arndt was awarded for his service as a medic in World War I with the Iron Cross and The Honour Cross of the World War 1914/1918, the latter of which was awarded to him as Nazi Germany was in the process of enacting antisemitic laws in 1935.

== Personal life ==
Arthur Arndt, born on August 20, 1893, in Germany, the son of Philip and Johanna Arndt, who were Orthodox Jews. His father was a glazier. Arndt grew up in the seaside resort town of Kolberg (Kołobrzeg), Germany.

Arndt studied medicine at the Friedrich-Wilhelms-Universitat in Berlin beginning in 1913, which prepared him to be a medic during World War I. He continued to care for soldiers after the war's end on November 11, 1918. He stayed in France and worked at a field hospital. Arndt received the Iron Cross for his military service. After World War I, he interned at Charité, a hospital in Berlin, and in 1921 married Lina Arnoldi, the daughter of a kosher butcher and Bertha Arnoldi.

Arndt had a medical practice in Berlin, serving non-Jews and Jewish people. He lived with Lina on Skalitzer Street in the Kreuzberg district of Berlin, where they were among the 2% minority of the residents who were Jewish. Arndt cared for his patients, whether or not they could pay. Arndt and Lina raised two children, Ruth and Erich. Ruth Anni Thea was born on May 16, 1922, and Erich Joachim was born on November 30, 1923. By 1925, Arndt hired a nanny Anni Schulz and a chauffeur to drive his 1922 Picard touring car. Arndt and his wife were liberal Jews who attended a neighborhood synagogue, but who did not keep a kosher kitchen and did not celebrate all of the Jewish holidays.

Their family expanded during World War II to include Erich's girlfriend, later his wife, Ellen Lewinsky and her mother Charlotte. After the war, Ruth married Bruno Gumpel, who also hid with the family during the war.

== World War II ==
=== Systematic antisemitism ===
A series of antisemitic laws, called Nuremberg Laws, were enacted beginning in 1935. At that time, Arndt was awarded The Honour Cross of the World War 1914/1918. As part of the Nazi's campaign against Jews, the Arndt family were forced to move into a small dismal one-bedroom apartment in a building designated for Jews. Arndt had to sell much of their furnishings and his medical equipment. The children shared the bedroom and the parents slept separately on furniture in the living room. In July 1938, the Fourth Decree to the Reich Citizenship Law, one of the antisemitic laws and practices, was enacted that limited Jewish doctors' ability to make a living as a physician. Jewish doctors became known as Krankenbehandlers (healers for the Jewish infirm). Arndt was told that he could not treat Aryan patients and he was taken off the Medical Register. Erich was dismissed from his school, where he had been a good student and an athlete. He then went to work delivering goods in the city on his bike.

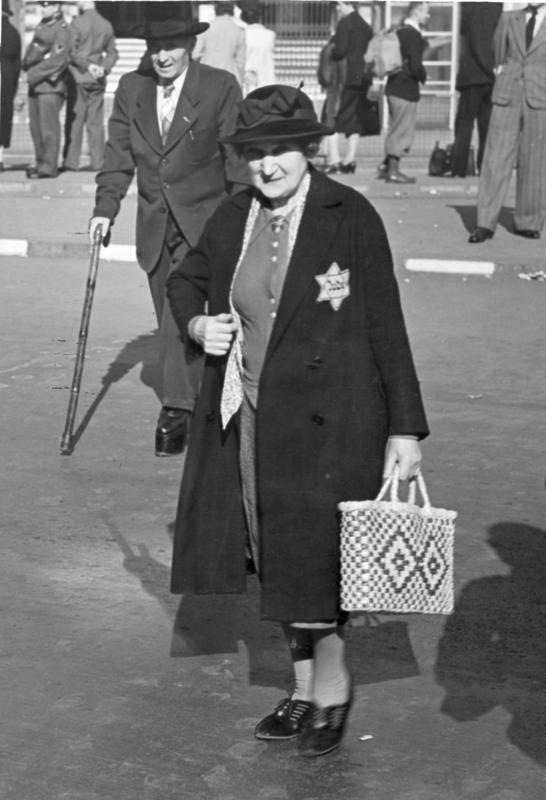
Jewish woman wearing a yellow badge in Berlin, September 1941

In the fall of 1938, Arndt obtained four exit visas for his family but gave one away to his nephew who was about to be sent to a concentration camp. On November 9, 1938, 30,000 Jewish men were deported to concentration camps. That night, 7,000 Jewish businesses and 1,000 synagogs were destroyed by Sturmabteilung during Kristallnacht (the night of broken glass). Treatment of the Jewish population continued to degrade and Arndt's attempts to obtain another exit visa were unsuccessful. Arndt and his son took training courses to improve their opportunities for gainful employment in a new country. Erich learned how to weld, operate metal-working machines, and be a locksmith and Arndt learned how to be an exterminator. By September 1939, half of Germany's 450,000 Jewish population had left the country. It was now harder, though, to move to another nation. Countries began turning back or closing their borders to Jewish refugees. Some had quotas for how many refugees they would accept in a year. Throughout 1940 and 1941, Jews were issued ration cards that increasingly restricted the types of food they could buy, excluding meat, canned goods, and more. The food that they were able to purchase became limited to cabbage, turnips, potatoes, noodles, and bread, which made Jews prone to disease and malnutrition. They could not buy new clothes and they had to give up their pets and radios.

By 1940, Jews were not supposed to be seen in public places. Arndt's children, Erich and Ruth defied the Nuremberg Laws and Nazi regime in 1940 by going to the beach. To make it easier to identify Jews, Nazi Germany required Jewish people to wear large yellow star badges beginning on September 19, 1941. In the center of the badge was the word Jude, meaning Jew. Jews began to be deported to concentration camps one month later on October 15. In Auschwitz concentration camp Jews were killed at the rate of 10,000 people a month. It was reported by a German industrialist that 2 million people had died and the Nazis intended to kill all of the Jews.

Erich and Ruth had been subject to forced labor by Nazi Germany in 1942. Ellen Lewinsky and her mother Charlotte were also slave laborers. Ellen was a member of the Jewish resistance group Gruppe Baum. Erich heard that Jewish slave laborers were about to be sent to Auschwitz concentration camp by Joseph Goebbels. He began making plans for his mother, sister, girlfriend and her mother, and a friend to hide from the Nazis. Erich tried to convince his father to hide, but Arndt was against the plan. A war veteran, Arndt had a hard time believing that Jews were victims of mass murder. He thought that they were sent to camps to work. Arndt also thought that Germany's loss at Stalingrad was a sign that things would get better for the Jews. However, members of their family and Ellen Lewinsky's family were taken to camps and were not heard from again. After extensive pleading by his son, Arndt conceded to find a place to hide from the Nazis. He talked to some of his patients and found out that Max Kohler and the couple Auguste and Max were very willing to help them.

Nazi Germans deported Jews to concentration camps during World War II, an effort that was in earnest after February 27, 1943, when Joseph Goebbels realized that there were still 4,000 Jews that had not been picked up. He wrote in his diary, "[t]hey are now wandering about Berlin without homes, are not registered with police and are naturally quite a public danger. I ordered the police, the Wehrmacht and the Party to do everything possible to round these Jews up as quickly as possible."

=== Anni and Gustav Schulz ===
Arndt was helped by Anni and Gustav Schulz of Neu Zittau, Brandenburg, a remote suburb of Berlin. In the 1920s, Anni was a governess to the Arndt's children and their housekeeper. She took in the Arndt's household items and the physician's medical instruments. At times, Arndt's wife Lina, described to her neighbors as a "lonesome friend", was taken in by Anni Schultz and her family. The Schulzs grew vegetables and raised chickens that were used to feed themselves and were handed out to Arndt family members who hid throughout Berlin.

=== Auguste and Max Gehre ===
The Gehres, who lived in a small apartment, brought Arndt into their home in 1943, where he lived for two and a half years. He felt at first that his daughter or one of his children should stay with them, but Auguste (also called Anni) persuaded him that he was most at risk as a military-aged, circumcised man. Women were easier to hide. Knowing other Hitler-hating and willing former patients of Arndt, she committed to ensuring that there were sufficient places for Arndt's family to stay. She felt duty-bound to him for saving the life of their only child. Before he moved in, the Gehres began helping the Arndt family by giving them some of their share of meat. Once he moved into their apartment, Arndt stayed in their pantry that had been converted to a small bedroom for their daughter. He shared the food that the family purchased with their food ration cards. The Gehres helped provide food and shelter, as well as conceal the Jewish refugees.

The Gehres were rare among the people of Berlin who did not let fear of what would happen to them stop them if they were caught helping Jews. The slight population of people who might help the family dwindled as Berliners‘ homes were bombed during the war.

Anyone who still maintains social relations with the Jew is one of them and must be considered a Jew himself and treated as such. He deserves the contempt of the entire nation, which he has deserted in its gravest hour to join the side of those who hate it.

— Joseph Goebbels, "The Jews are to blame!", Das Reich, November 16, 1943.

=== Max Kohler ===
Hans and his son Max Kohler, factory owners, took in Erich when the Arndt family went into hiding. Erich worked as a journeyman during the days and spent the nights in the factory. Later, he also hired and sheltered Erich's friend, Bruno Gumpel (whose parents were sent to Auschwitz). The Kohlers, whose factory was in Kreuzberg and within 2 miles (3.2 km) from Hitler's bunker, said of the time "If the Germans are going to kill me for hiding one Jew, they might as well kill me for hiding six Jews."

Six members of the group, Arndt's wife, daughter, and son, Bruno, Ellen, and Catherine spent the last eight months of the war at the factory. For sleeping, they had thin mattresses that were placed on the floor or tables. Erich and the others woke up at 5 a.m. to hide their bedding and belongings. Erich stayed in the factory so that he would not be noticed by anyone who knew him on the streets. Since the Nazis inspected factories during the day, the rest of the group rode the subway or walked the streets.

=== Ruth, Ellen, and Charlotte ===
Ellen and Charlotte left suicide notes, hoping the Nazis would believe they were dead. They stayed off and on at the Kohler factory. A German officer, Herr Wehlen, hired Ellen and Ruth to work for him for a short time. Wehlen was also a black marketer and hosted dinners for soldiers, some of whom were prone to lewd behavior. Two sisters hired Ellen to clean their floors. The siblings had been patients of Arndt. Charlotte was hidden by a prostitute. She slept through the days and left at night so that her host could receive men for work.

=== Survival ===
Jewish people could not work, buy food, or attend school during the war. Arthur Arndt's extended family worked covertly as laborers and domestic servants and moved periodically to various hiding places. More than 50 Germans helped the Arndts, Lewinskys, and Gumpel hide and survive. Some people helped with food or shelter. Others helped just by knowing that they were in hiding, but they did not tell the Nazis about them. They had close calls with Nazis and people called "catchers" who would receive money for turning Jews in to the Nazis. Ellen's strategy if she saw soldiers was to walk up to them, taking an offensive position. They had to make do with whatever they could obtain from friends. They lived off of worm-infested chicken feed for three months. Arndt handed out vitamins to his family to stave off illnesses, but they became ill because of a lack of thiamine. They lost a lot of weight, Erich lost 40 pounds, weighing just 100 pounds. Ellen lost nearly as much and weighed about 90 pounds at the end of the war. They weathered bombings that took out houses near them, but the factory remained standing. The Arndts, Lewinskys, and Gumpel were liberated by the Russian army. They all survived the war. Arndt's items that had been stored at the Schulz home were returned to him. Of particular importance to the family was a brass menorah that the Arndts used for the Festival of Lights ever since they were freed in 1945.

Barbara Lovenheim, author of Survival in the Shadows about the Arndt and Lewinsky families wrote,

How roughly 6,000 Jewish Germans managed to survive the atrocities of Nazism by living day to day in a shadowy underworld without identity cards, food ration books, secure accommodations, or money... this was a story of tremendous courage, resilience, and resourcefulness in the darkest days of Hitler's rule.

== After the war ==
Arthur and Lina Arndt moved to the United States, having arrived on the SS Marine Marlin on December 20, 1946. In 1950, Arndt was working as a physician in a New York City hospital. Arthur died on January 13, 1974. Lina, who was born July 22, 1886, in Prussia, Germany, died on December 14, 1980.

The two Arndt adult children and their spouses, as well as Charlotte Lewinsky, arrived in the United States on May 20, 1946, aboard the SS Marine Flasher, which was the first ship of Jewish refugees to arrive in the United States in May 1946. Erich married Ellen in a synagog in Berlin shortly after the war. Charlotte had a friend in Connecticut who helped Erich and Ellen move to the United States. They lived in Long Island until 1957 and then moved to Rochester, New York. They had two children. In 1997, Ellen gave an interview about her experiences during the war for the USC Shoah Foundation. Ellen died before Erich, who died on September 12, 2011. Ruth married Bruno Gumpel and lived in California. They had two sons, Larry and Stanley. Ruth recorded an interview with the USC Shoah Foundation on July 20, 1997.

Karl and Auguste Gehre, as well as Gustav and Anni Schulz, received the title Righteous Among the Nations in 1988.

== Bibliography ==
- Lovenheim, Barbara (2016) [2002]. Survival in the Shadows: Seven Jews Hidden in Hitler's Berlin. New York: Open Road Integrated Media. ISBN 978-1-5040-3998-7. OCLC 1342139557.
