= First Year of Deception =

Sana Oula Nasb
- سنة اولى نصب
- Directed by: Kamla Abu Zekry
- Written by: Samira Mohsen
- Screenplay by: Samira Mohsen
- Produced by: Samira Mohsen
- Starring: Ahmed Ezz; Nour; Khaled Selim; Dalia El Behairy; Hassan Hosny; Samira Mohsen; Osama Abbas; Moatazza Abdel Sabour; Tamir Samir
- Cinematography: Ahmed Marsi
- Distributed by: Oscar
- Release date: January 23, 2004
- Running time: 90 minutes
- Country: Egypt
- Language: Arabic
- Budget: $277,283

Sana Oula Nasb (Arabic: سنة أولى نصب), or First Year of Deception / First Year Con is a 2004 Egyptian romantic comedy directed by Kamla Abu Zekry and assistant director Ahmad Asama. The film was produced and written by Samira Mohsen and starred Ahmed Ezz, Nour, Khaled Selim, Dalia El Behairy, Hassan Hosny, Samira Mohsen, Osama Abbas, Moatazza Abdel Sabour, and Tamer Samir. It is available on digital platforms and available online.

The plot is set in Hurghada, Egypt: two unemployed Egyptian university graduates, Ahmed and Khaled, resort to conning tourists in Hurghada. After meeting two girls, Dalia and Noor, with whom they fall in love, they decide to change their con ways, and work honestly in the tourism business.

== Plot ==
There are two characters, Ahmed and Khaled, played by Ahmed Ezz and Khaled Selim. They're best friends and went to the same university together. They later also graduate from the university together. After graduation they found it very hard to find work. They stayed unemployed for a very long time. After thinking together for a very long time and trying to figure out a way to make money they came up with an idea. This idea was to become con artists. The movie starts by them conning people into leaving down payments for buying apartments when in reality they're just taking they're money and running away. When they get caught and run away they decided to con older ladies in Hurghada. Hurghada is a touristic place in Egypt that is about a 6-hour drive away from Cairo. Their plan was to makeout with girls in Hurghada and take from them or steal from money. They kept doing this as their way to get money and it actually worked. At one point in the movie Khaled complains to Ahmed that he is against the way they're living right now and that he feels bad about working hard and graduating from university and ending up as con artists. Eventually they meet two girls, Nour and Dalia, played by the Egyptian actresses Nour and Dalia Behery. After meeting these two girls, the two guys realize that they're very attracted to them. They have a conversation and begin to get to know each other more. When Nour and Dalia asked Ahmed and Khaled what do they work as, the guys said that they are businessmen. These two girls were cousins. Their uncle, whose name is Hassan, was a very popular businessman. This is where the girls decided that they'll let these two guys work with their uncle and do business together. Later the guys met Hassan and decided on a business plan to open a restaurant. In the process of doing this business Ahmed fell in love with Nour while Khaled fell in love with Dalia. Nour and Dalia's friend, Kooky later builds this crazy jealousy towards their relationships. She decided to call Nour's father and tell her about her love story with Ahmed. Nour's father is a very important businessman and later surprises his daughter for a visit. He later tells Nour that he searched these guy's names and knows that they're con artists. The father tried to explain to Nour that the business these guys claim to do is a lie and that they took their money but will not do any business with it. After that Ahmed meets Nour's dad and before talking with him Nour's dad attacks him with his facts and tells Ahmed that he knows that he and his friend are thieves. Later the police surprises Ahmed and Khaled while they're with Dalia and Nour and lock them up. Nour and Dalia find out everything after the police arrests them. While Nour seems a little understanding to why they might have decided to steal the money Dalia shows that she's completely against it. After Ahmed and Khaled get out of jail Nour goes and visits Ahmed and tells him how much she's in love with him regardless of everything that happened. For a while Ahmed holds back and tells her that she deserves better and doesn't see her. However, Nour doesn't stop trying until she convinces him that they deserve to be together. In the meantime Khaled tries to get Dalia back and after trying a lot he eventually succeeds. The movie ends by opening the restaurant they wanted to open in the beginning and the two couples end up together.

== Cast ==
- Ahmed Ezz
- Nour
- Khaled Selim
- Dalia El Behairy
- Hassan Hosny
- Samira Mohsen
- Osama Abbas
- Moatazza Abdel Sabour
- Tamer Samir

== Production ==
Sana Oula Nasb is a movie that was released on January 31, 2004. The film was shot in Hurghada, Egypt, in the year 2003 and is 90 minutes long. The film is written and produced in Arabic, and concluded with a budget of $277,283. The crew included:

Directed by: Kamla Abu Zekry

Writing Credits: Samira Mohsen

Produced by: Samira Mohsen

Music by: Samira Mohsen

Cinematography by : Ahmed al Morsy

Art Department (Graphic Design): Bassem Morcos

== Marketing ==
The film Sana Oula Nasb was mostly marketed and sold through DVDs since it was published before the rise of Social networking services.

== Commercial releases ==
The film Sana Oula Nasb was first premiered at Grand Hall in Makka Mall in the Capital of Jordan, Amman.
