= Kamla Abou Zekry =

Egyptian film director (born 1974)

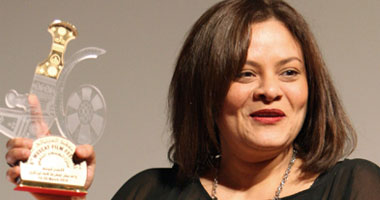
- Born: 8 January 1974 (age 52); Cairo
- Citizenship: Egypt
- Occupations: Film director, Television director, Director

Kamla Abou Zekry (born January 8, 1974) is an Egyptian television and film director who directed well-known movies and TV series such as Bent Esmaha Zaat, Segn El Nisaa, and Wahed Sefr. She has taken part in many international and national film festivals, including the Cairo International Film Festival, the Dubai International Film Festival, and the Venice Film Festival. Her films have also been screened at the Cannes Film Festival.

== Life ==
Abou Zekry was born in Cairo, Egypt. She graduated from the Higher Institute of Cinema, and started her film career by collaborating with Nadel Galal on 131 Ashghal in 1993.

Zekry has collaborated with screenwriter Mariam Naoom on several TV series. A Girl Named Zat (2013) was an adaptation of Sonallah Ibrahim's 1992 novel Zaat. Women's Prison (2014), based on a play by Fathia al-Assal, was shot in Qanater Prison.

Abou Zekry was quick to respond to the January 25 Revolution. 18 Days was a collaboration with Mariam Abou Auf, daughter of Egyptian actor and composer Ezzat Abou Aouf, while God's Creation followed the story of a girl selling tea on the street who joins the revolution.

A Day for Women was the opening film at Cairo Film Festival in winter 2016.

== Works ==
=== Films ===
- (with Nader Galal) 131 Ashghal / 131 Works, 1993
- Qittar Al Sa’aa Al Sadisah / The Six O’ Clock Train, 1999. Short film.
- (with Nader Galal) Hello America, 2000
- Sanna Oula Nasb / First Year Con, 2004. Feature film.
- Malek wa ketaba, 2005. Feature film.
- An el ashq wel hawa, 2006
- (with Mariam Abou Auf) Tamantashar Yom / 18 Days, 2011
- Khelket Rabena / God's Creation, 2011
- A Day for Women, 2016

=== TV Series ===
- 6 Midan El-Tahrir, 2009
- Wahed-Sefr / One-Zero, 2009
- A Girl Named Zat, 2013
- Segn El Nesa / Women's Jail, 2014
- Wahet El Ghoroub / Sunset Oasis, 2017
- 100 Wesh / 100 Face, 2020
- Bitulou' Al-Rouh/As the Spirit breaks out (in critique of ISIS), 2022
