= Drill Master diving accident =

Fatal diving bell accident off Norway in 1974

- Date: 17 January 1974
- Location: North Sea, Norway
- Cause: Diving bell drop weight accidentally released
- Participants: Per Skipnes, Robert John Smyth

Ocean Systems' bell showing drop weight

The Drill Master diving accident was an incident in Norway in January 1974 that resulted in the death of two commercial divers. During a two-man dive from the North Sea rig Drill Master, the diving bell's drop weight was accidentally released, causing the bell to surface from a depth of 320 feet (98 m) with its bottom door open and drag the diver working outside through the water on his umbilical. The two divers, Per Skipnes and Robert John Smyth, both died from rapid decompression and drowning. The accident was caused by instructions aboard Drill Master which had not been updated when the bell system was modified and which stated that a valve that was closed during the dive should have been open. Skipnes's body was never recovered.
