= Barbara Lovenheim =

American journalist and author

Barbara Lovenheim (Note: There is also a Barbara Pitlick Lovenheim from Rochester, New York, who married into the Lovenheim family.) is an American journalist and author who founded the online magazine NYCitywoman.com. She has written for The Wall Street Journal, The New York Times, and other newspapers and magazines. Lovenheim has also written the books Beating the Marriage Odds: When You Are Smart, Single, and Over 35 and Survival in the Shadows: Seven Jews Hidden in Hitler’s Berlin.

== Personal life and education ==
Barbara Lovenheim, the daughter of May (Yampolski) and Clifford Lovenheim, was raised in Rochester, New York. Her siblings are John and Martha. An honors student at Monroe High School, she was an English major at Barnard College, graduating in 1962. Seeking advanced degrees, she graduated from the University of Wisconsin with a master's degree and from the University of Rochester with her Ph.D. in 1990. She partnered with John Grimes when she was about the age of 50. Grimes was a radio news correspondent for ABC.Lovenheim is a member of the Barnard-Columbia Alumni Social Committee.

== Career ==
Lovenheim taught at Queens College and Baruch College for more than 14 years. She wrote an article about ghostwriters writing books for college professors about 1975. She then worked at a public relations company in New York. She was a freelance writer for Manhattan publications, like The Village Voice, which led to her writing for The New York Times. She wrote about Maria Callas and Margot Fonteyn. She lived in London for one year and returned to New York. Lovenheim was a correspondent for the United Nations.

Lovenheim began to cover social issues. She wrote Brides at Last: Women Over 40 Who Beat the Odds around 1986, followed up by the book Beating the Marriage Odds: When You Are Smart, Single, and Over 35 in 1990. She was prompted to write the article and book after Newsweek published an article that claimed "that a single woman over 40 had a better chance of being killed by a terrorist than getting married", which was the conclusion of a study by Yale and Harvard University researchers. (Note: The New York Times called it the Bennet-Bloom study of 1987.) She began doing her own research with led to the first book, Brides at Last.

Lovenheim has written about celebrities, including Katharine Hepburn, Cher, and Robert Redford. She created brochures and books for organizations, such as the Museum of Jewish Heritage and the New York City Ballet. Lovenheim wrote the book Survival in the Shadows: Seven Jews Hidden in Hitler’s Berlin (2003) about Jewish people who survived the Holocaust in Berlin. She published Breaking Ground: A Century of Craft Art in Western New York in 2010. She founded the online magazine, NYCitywoman.com.
