= December 1973 =

Month of 1973

<<	December 1973					>>
Su	Mo	Tu	We	Th	Fr	Sa
						1
2	3	4	5	6	7	8
9	10	11	12	13	14	15
16	17	18	19	20	21	22
23	24	25	26	27	28	29
30	31

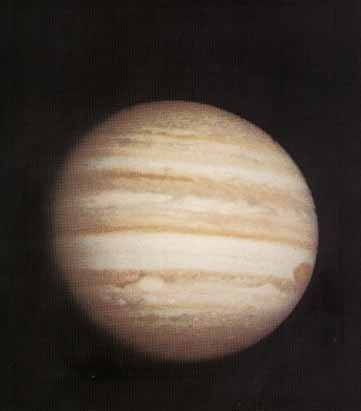
December 3, 1973: First close photos of planet Jupiter transmitted to Earth

The following events occurred in December 1973:

== December 1, 1973 (Saturday) ==
Papua New Guinea

- Papua New Guinea was granted self-government by Australia in advance of eventual independence. No ceremonies were held because of the danger of violence from anti-independence groups, and at 10:00 a.m. at Port Moresby, Australian administrator Les Johnson administered the oath of office to Chief Minister Michael Somare.
- Sheikh Mujibur Rahman, president of Bangladesh, announced an amnesty for 36,400 prisoners who had been accused, during the Bangladesh Liberation War and the Bangladesh genocide, of collaboration with the Pakistan.
- Bob Foster of the United States became the first black boxer to defeat a white challenger in a bout in South Africa, which had strict racial segregation under its apartheid policies at the time. Foster, the world light heavyweight champion, outpointed South Africa's Pierre Fourie in a 15-round bout at Rand Stadium in Johannesburg.
- In West Germany's Baden-Württemberg state, the villages of Conweiler, Schwann, and Pfinzweiler-Feldrennach were merged to create the small town of Straubenhardt. A fourth village, Ottenhausen, was added one month later and Langenalb would follow on January 1, 1975.
- Commercial diver Timothy House was lost at sea while conducting a surface-orientated dive in the North Sea from the semi-submersible drill rig Blue Water III. House, who was performing routine maintenance, was assumed to have cut through his umbilical due to hypothermia.

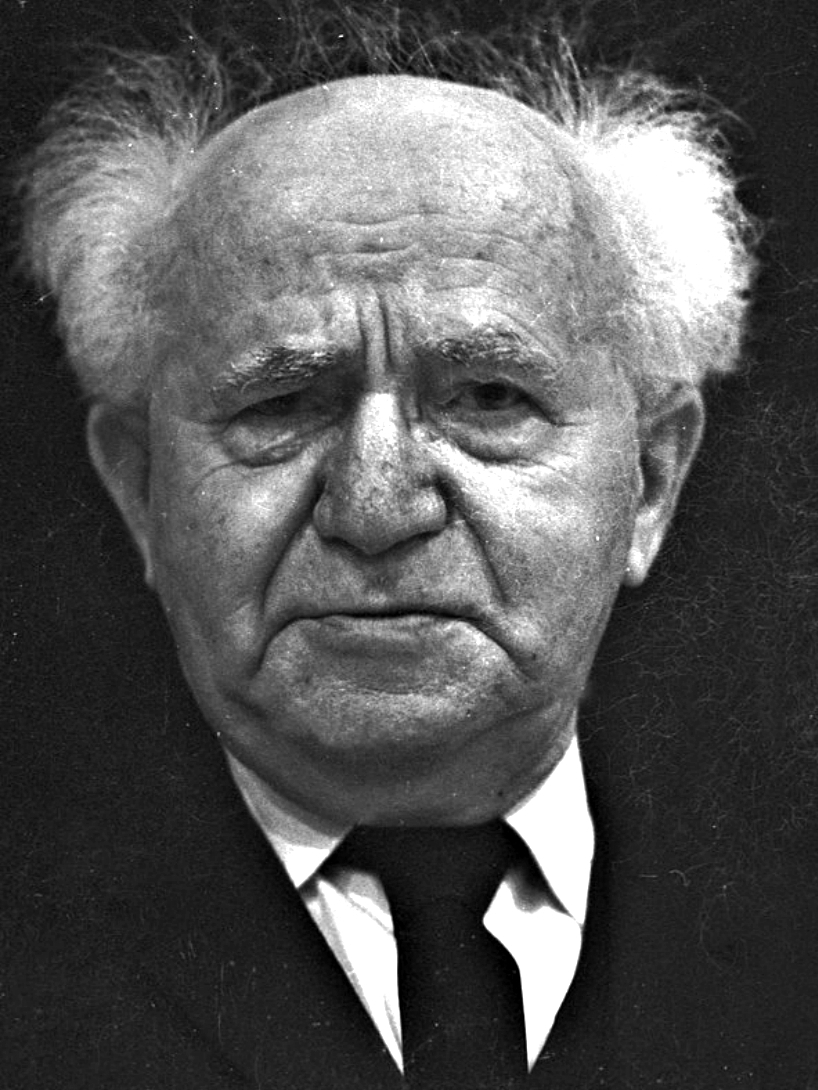
Ben-Gurion in 1967

- Born:
  - Bahareh Rahnama, Iranian film actress; in Arak
  - Rajesh Sharma, Indian film actor; in Kollam, Kerala state
- Died: David Ben-Gurion, 87, Polish-born Zionist leader and first Prime Minister of Israel, died 13 days after suffering a cerebral hemorrhage. He had been in a coma since November 23.

== December 2, 1973 (Sunday) ==
- The Roman Catholic Church issued a change in the Rite of Penance (Ordo Paenitentiae) for the first time in more than 350 years, three days after approval had been granted by Pope Paul VI. The previous text for the Rite had been promulgated in 1614 by Pope Paul V.
- A team of military engineers from the 12th Vietcong Sapper Regiment destroyed the largest oil storage facility in South Vietnam with an attack on the Shell Oil Company's tanks at Nha Be.
- Born:
  - Monica Seles, Yugoslavian-born tennis player with ten Grand Slam tournament wins, including (in 1992) all four of the women's singles finals at Wimbledon and the Australian, French and U.S. Open tournaments; in Novi Sad, SR Serbia
  - Grant Wahl, American sports journalist who suffered a fatal heart attack while in Qatar to cover the 2022 FIFA World Cup; in Mission, Kansas (d. 2022)
- Died:
  - Abdul Samad Khan Achakzai, 66, Pakistani politician who founded the Anjuman-i-Watan Baluchistan within British India, was assassinated by two grenades thrown into his home at Quetta.
  - U.S. Admiral Richard G. Colbert, 58, President of the Naval War College 1968 to 1971

== December 3, 1973 (Monday) ==
- Pioneer 10 sent back the first close-up images of Jupiter, making its closest approach of 82,178 miles (132,253 km). Images were received at NASA Ames Research Center in California at 6:25 in the evening (0125 4 December UTC). Boosted by Jupiter's gravity to a speed of 82,000 miles per hour (132,000 km/h) — the highest speed ever attained by an object sent from Earth— the small probe began moving away from Jupiter three hours later toward the constellation Taurus.
- Lee Hu-rak was fired as director of the Korean Central Intelligence Agency by South Korea's President Park Chung Hee as part of a major shakeup of the nation's cabinet. The cause of Lee's dismissal was the August 8 kidnapping of Park's political opponent, Kim Dae-jung. Kim Jong-pil was retained as prime minister.
- Died: Count Fleet, 33, U.S. champion racehorse who won the Triple Crown (Kentucky Derby, Preakness Stakes and Belmont Stakes) in 1943

== December 4, 1973 (Tuesday) ==
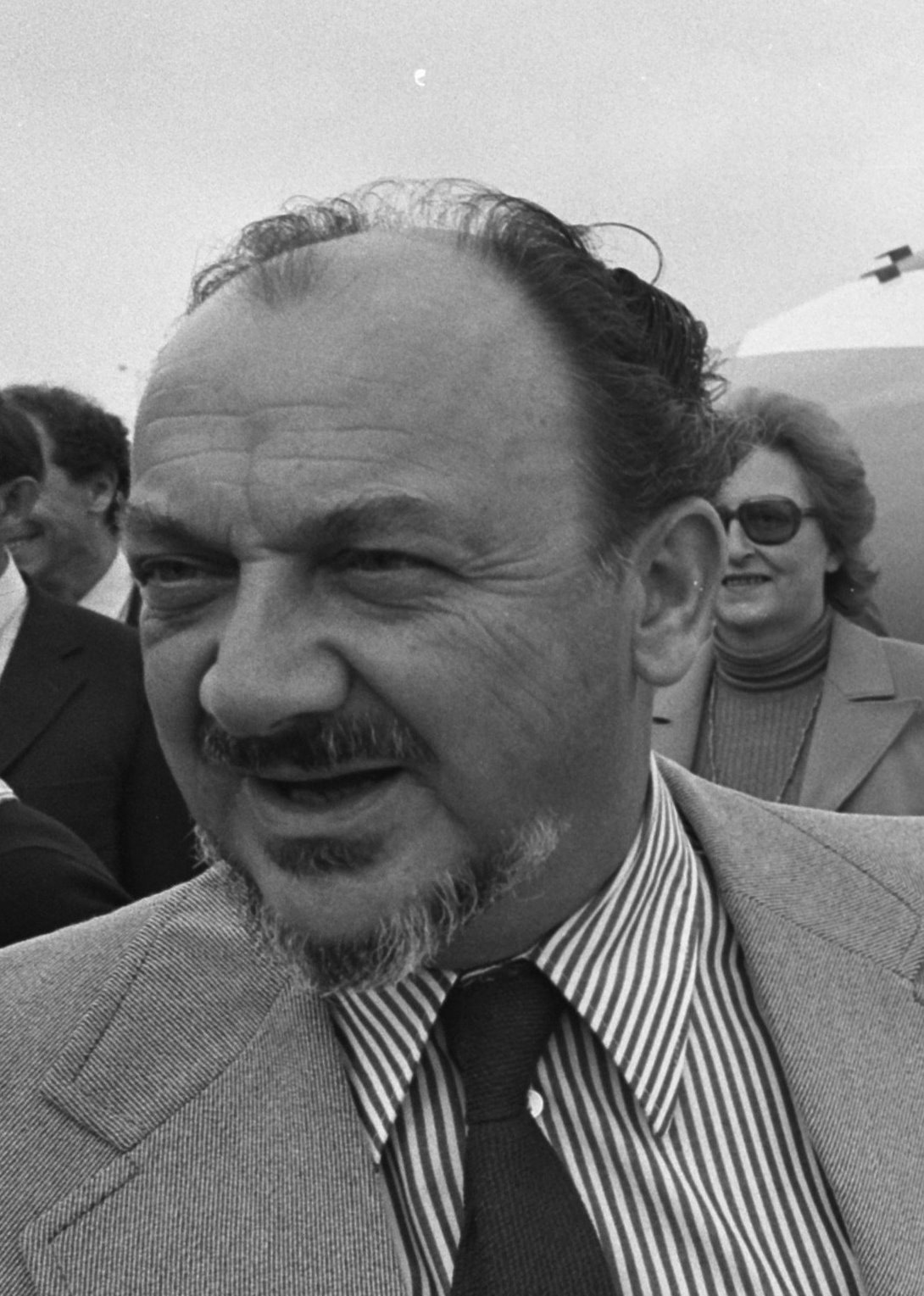
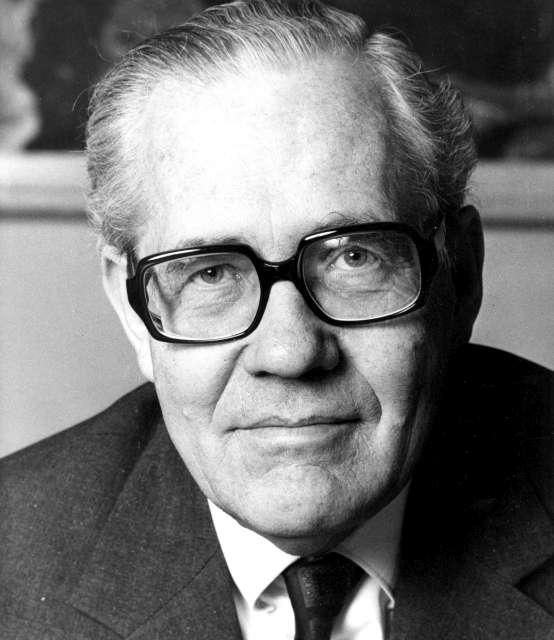
Jørgensen and Hartling
- Voting was held in Denmark for the 175 Danish seats of the 179-member Folketing. In what became known as the Jordskredsvalget (the Landslide Vote), more than half of the Folketing members were replaced and the Socialdemokratiet party, led by Prime Minister Anker Jørgensen, lost one third of its seats, dropping from 70 to 46. A coalition of opposition parties would form a new government 15 days later with Poul Hartling as the new premier.
- The Alabama Crimson Tide became one of the winners of the U.S. college football championship under the sport's format at the time. With no provision for a national playoff, the title, recognized by the NCAA, was determined by the polls of the two major wire services, the sportswriters poll of the Associated Press (AP) and the Coaches Poll of United Press International (UPI). The final UPI poll of 35 coaches was taken at the end of the regular season, without consideration of postseason bowl games, and was made three days after Alabama had finished with an 11-0-0 record with a 35–0 win over Auburn. In the poll, the University of Alabama had 325 points, ahead of five other unbeaten teams — Oklahoma (10-0-1)(292 points), Ohio State (9-0-1), Notre Dame (10-0-0), Penn State (11-0-0) and Michigan (10-0-1). Alabama would be defeated by #4 Notre Dame in the Sugar Bowl game on December 31, and be voted national champion in the AP poll.
- The MGM Grand Hotel, with 2,100 rooms and one of the world's largest hotels at the time, quietly opened in Las Vegas. A celebrity-studded grand opening was held the next day.
- Born: Tyra Banks, American supermodel, film and TV actress, known for producing and hosting America's Next Top Model; in Inglewood, California
- Died: Michael O'Shea, 67, American film and television actor and husband of Virginia Mayo

== December 5, 1973 (Wednesday) ==
- Elections were held for parliament and the president were held in the southern African nation of Zambia. Voters had a choice from multiple candidates from Zambia's only legal political party, the United National Independence Party (UNIP), for the 125 seats of the National Assembly, and three cabinet ministers were defeated by other UNIP candidates in their districts. President Kenneth Kaunda was re-elected in a yes-no vote with 88.8% of voters in his favor. Voter turnout was only 39% for the presidential election, and only 33% of eligible voters participated in the National Assembly election.
- Born:
  - Sorin Grindeanu, Prime Minister of Romania during 2017; in Caransebeș
  - Shalom Harlow, Canadian actress and model; in Oshawa, Ontario
- Died:
  - Eugeni Xammar, 85, Spanish Catalan journalist
  - Tom Dorrien-Smith, 60, the exclusive leaseholder of the island of Tresco in Cornwall, England, since 1955, died from cancer. His position was inherited by his son, Robert Dorrien-Smith.

== December 6, 1973 (Thursday) ==
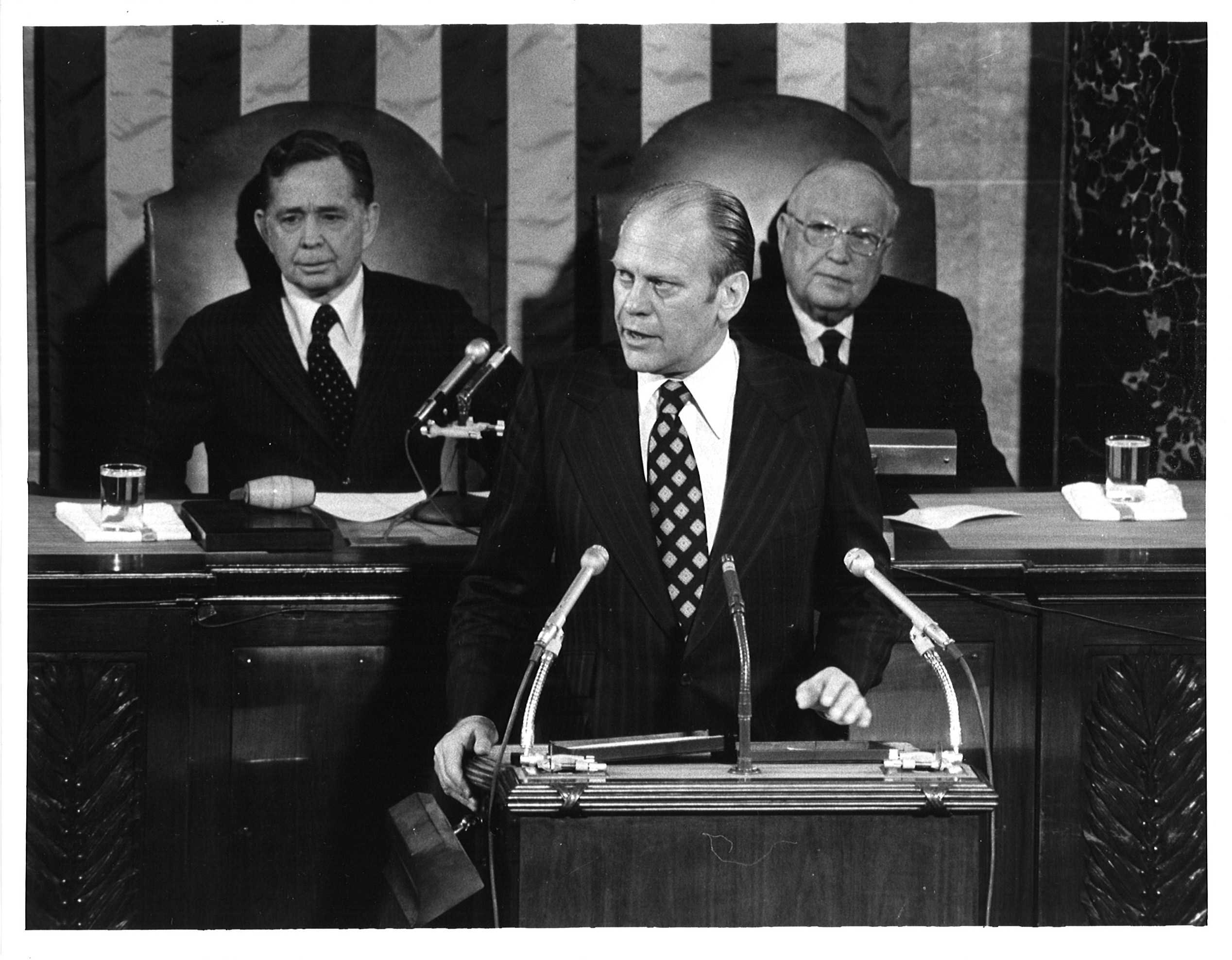
New U.S. Vice President Gerald R. Ford: "I'm a Ford, not a Lincoln"

- The U.S. House of Representatives voted, 387 to 35, to confirm U.S. Representative Gerald Ford of Michigan as the 40th Vice President of the United States, after the U.S. Senate had approved the nomination, 92 to 3, on November 27. Ford was sworn in later in the day. Ford became the first vice president to be confirmed under the 25th Amendment to the U.S. Constitution. Afterward, in speech to the joint session of Congress, the new vice president invoked the names of two related automobile lines by joking, "I'm a Ford, not a Lincoln."
- The Fuel and Electricity (Control) Act 1973, title "An Act to make temporary provision for controlling the production, supply, acquisition and use of certain substances and of electricity; and for purposes connected with those matters," took effect in the United Kingdom after being given royal assent.
- A landslide killed 14 residents of a slum neighborhood in southwest Mexico City, and injured 25 others, most of them seriously.
- Victor E. Samuelson, an executive for the energy producing Exxon Corporation, was kidnapped in Argentina by the terrorist Ejército Revolucionario del Pueblo (ERP, the Revolutionary Army of the People). A group of seven ERP guerrillas took him from the Esso Argentina refinery at Campana, near Buenos Aires, where Samuelson was the refinery manager. Samuelson would be held hostage for 144 days, until April 29, 1974, before being released on Exxon's payment of a then-record kidnap ransom of $14,200,000, equivalent to almost $95 million in 2023.

== December 7, 1973 (Friday) ==
- With the elimination of the U.S. Coast Guard Women's Reserve, the United States Coast Guard accepted its first regular enlisted women. Chief Warrant Officer Alice T. Jefferson was commissioned as the first woman to be a regular USCG officer, and Yeoman First Class Wanda May Parr and Yeoman Second Class Margaret A. Blackman as the first female enlistees.
- The crash of Aeroflot Flight 964 killed 16 of the 75 people on board, including five of the seven crew, during a landing at Moscow's Domodevo Airport.
- Convicted child murderer Lester Eubanks escaped from the Ohio Penitentiary after being allowed a temporary, unsupervised furlough to go Christmas shopping, and would elude searchers for more than 49 years afterward. As of the end of 2022, Eubanks would still be on the U.S. Marshals "15 Most Wanted Fugitives" list.
- Born: Damien Rice, Irish singer-songwriter; in Kildare.

== December 8, 1973 (Saturday) ==
- At 12:01 a.m., the maximum speed limit on motorways in the United Kingdom was reduced from 70 miles per hour (110 km/h) to 50 miles per hour (80 km/h) by the government, three days after being authorized by Parliament, as a measure to conserve oil to last until at least April 8, 1974. "Although no signs will be altered," a government press release stated, "police will not regard ignorance of the new law as an excuse."
- The Portuguese Governor-General of Mozambique, General Pimentel dos Santo, granted an amnesty of more than 400 political prisoners in Portugal's East African colony.
- Following the revelation that U.S. President Richard Nixon had paid only a few hundred dollars of federal income taxes in 1970 and 1971, Nixon offered at a press conference to let a Congressional committee review all of his tax returns and said that he would pay back taxes and interest if any of his claimed deductions were improper. Nixon also allowed reporters to inspect his tax returns filed by him as president for the years 1969 through 1972, on the condition that the copies could not be taken out of the White House.
- In a nationwide referendum in Australia, voters overwhelmingly rejected a proposed amendment to the federal constitution to allow the government to control prices and wages. The plan was rejected in all six states, with no votes on price regulation ranging from 51% in New South Wales to 68% in Western Australia. The no vote on income regulation was even higher, from 60% in New South Wales to 75% in Western Australia.
- Celeste Dandeker, a 21-year-old English dancer, sustained a broken neck while performing at the Manchester Opera House and suffered quadriplegia. After being profiled in a TV documentary on BBC, and encouraged by an admirer to create dances for persons with disabilities, she and Adam Benjamin would create Candoco Dance Company in 1991.
- Born:
  - Gina Hinojosa, American politician, Governor-elect of Texas, in McAllen, Texas
  - Corey Taylor, American singer-songwriter and musician (Slipknot, Stone Sour), in Des Moines
- Died: Yuri Nikolayevich Raevsky, 21, Soviet Russian serial killer who murdered six women in 1971, was executed by a firing squad.

== December 9, 1973 (Sunday) ==
- The Sunningdale Agreement was signed between the Republic of Ireland and the United Kingdom of Great Britain and Northern Ireland, with an agreement that the Irish government and the Northern Irish government would both prosecute persons accused of violent crimes, regardless of which part of Ireland where the crime was perpetrated. The agreement also created the 14-member Council of Ireland with seven members from mostly-Catholic Ireland and mostly-Protestant Northern Ireland. The pact was signed in Sunningdale, Berkshire by Prime Minister Edward Heath, Irish premier Liam Cosgrave, and representatives of the Ulster Unionist Party, the Social Democratic and Labour Party and the Alliance Party of Northern Ireland. The new Council was sworn in on December 31.
- Voters in Venezuela cast ballots for the new president, as well as all 200 seats in the Chamber of Deputies and 47 of the 50 seats in the Venezuelan Senate. The Acción Democrática (AD) party gained 36 seats for majority control (102 to 98) over the opposition in the Chamber and nine more seats for control (28 to 19) in the Senate. Carlos Andrés Pérez of the AD was elected president of Venezuela with 48.71% of the vote, over Lorenzo Fernández of COPEI (36.7%) and 10 other candidates.
- Born: Li Quan, Chinese martial artist; in Qiqihar, Heilongjiang province, People's Republic of China
- Died: Leonid Pervomayskiy, 65, Jewish Ukrainian Soviet poet and Stalin Prize winner

== December 10, 1973 (Monday) ==
- The government of Austria closed the Schönau Castle transit camp for Jewish emigres from the Soviet Union, fulfilling a promise made by Chancellor Bruno Kreisky for the release of four hostages who had been seized by Arab gunmen in September. The camp had been operated since 1971 by the Jewish Agency for Immigration Agency for Immigration and Resettlement of Jews. Kreisky, an Austrian Jew who had been able to escape to Sweden shortly after Nazi Germany's annexation of Austria in 1938, defended the action as necessary because the camp's existence was a threat to Austria's national security. Afterward, Soviet Jews traveling to Israel were able to stay temporarily at an Austrian Red Cross aid station at Wollersdorf, but had to be flown to Tel Aviv within 14 hours.
- American serial killer Bernard Giles, known to have killed at least five girls and women, including four the previous month, attempted to claim two more victims in Florida. The two underage girls fought back, escaped his car, and were able to provide police a description of Giles and his car, and had even seen his name on a book in the vehicle. Giles was arrested the next day and later sentenced to life in prison.
- Kevin Mallon, one of the three Irish Republican Army convicts who had escaped from Mountjoy Prison in Dublin on October 31, was recaptured after less than six weeks. Mallon was spotted attending a dance at a hotel ballroom in Portlaoise.

== December 11, 1973 (Tuesday) ==
- The Treaty of Prague was signed by the West Germany and Czechoslovakia. The two states established diplomatic relations, and declared the 1938 Munich Agreements to be null and void, acknowledging the inviolability of their common borders and abandoning all territorial claims.
- The American Revolution Bicentennial Administration (ARBA) was created as a U.S. government agency to co-ordinate celebrations of the United States Bicentennial during the period from April 1, 1975, to July 4, 1976. The new law to fund multiple celebrations replaced the original 1966 creation of the American Revolution Bicentennial Commission for a planned "Expo '76" world's fair in Philadelphia.
- All 10 passengers and crew were killed in the crash of a U.S. Navy R6D-1 airplane on the uninhabited Great Sitkin Island in the remote Andreanof Islands of the U.S. state of Alaska. The flight was taking service members from Elmendorf Air Force Base to Adak Island in advance of a furlough home for Christmas and crashed into the side of a mountain.
- Born: Mos Def (stage name for Dante Terrell Smith), American rapper and TV host; in Brooklyn, New York City

== December 12, 1973 (Wednesday) ==
- A typographical error made by the new U.S. Federal Energy Office led to reports nationwide that President Nixon was proposing to reduce American gasoline production by 25 percent, effective December 27. With priority given under administrator William Simon's regulations to the Department of Defense, and services such as public transportation and emergency vehicles, the Associated Press noted, the amount left over for retail gasoline stations would be "a cut of far more than 25 percent." The mistake was caught 10 hours later and hastily corrected to note that the proposed cut was 5% rather than 25%. A spokesman for the Federal Energy Office told reporters, "We screwed up this morning."
- Elections were held for the first time in the Arab kingdom of Bahrain, as voters chose candidates for 30 of the 44 seats in the nation's unicameral Majlis. The Malis would be dissolved in 1975 by the nation's King Isa bin Salman Al Khalifa and another election would not take place until 2002.
- The China Motor Corporation (CMC), based in Taiwan, opened its first manufacturing facility, located at Yangmei, in Taoyuan City three years after entering into a technology sharing contract with the Mitsubishi Motors, a Japanese manufacturer.
- The city of San Diego, California filed an antitrust lawsuit against the National League claiming there was a conspiracy to move the San Diego Padres baseball team from San Diego to Washington D.C.
- Born: Tony Hsieh, American Internet entrepreneur and venture capitalist, CEO of Zappos; in Illinois(d. 2020)

== December 13, 1973 (Thursday) ==
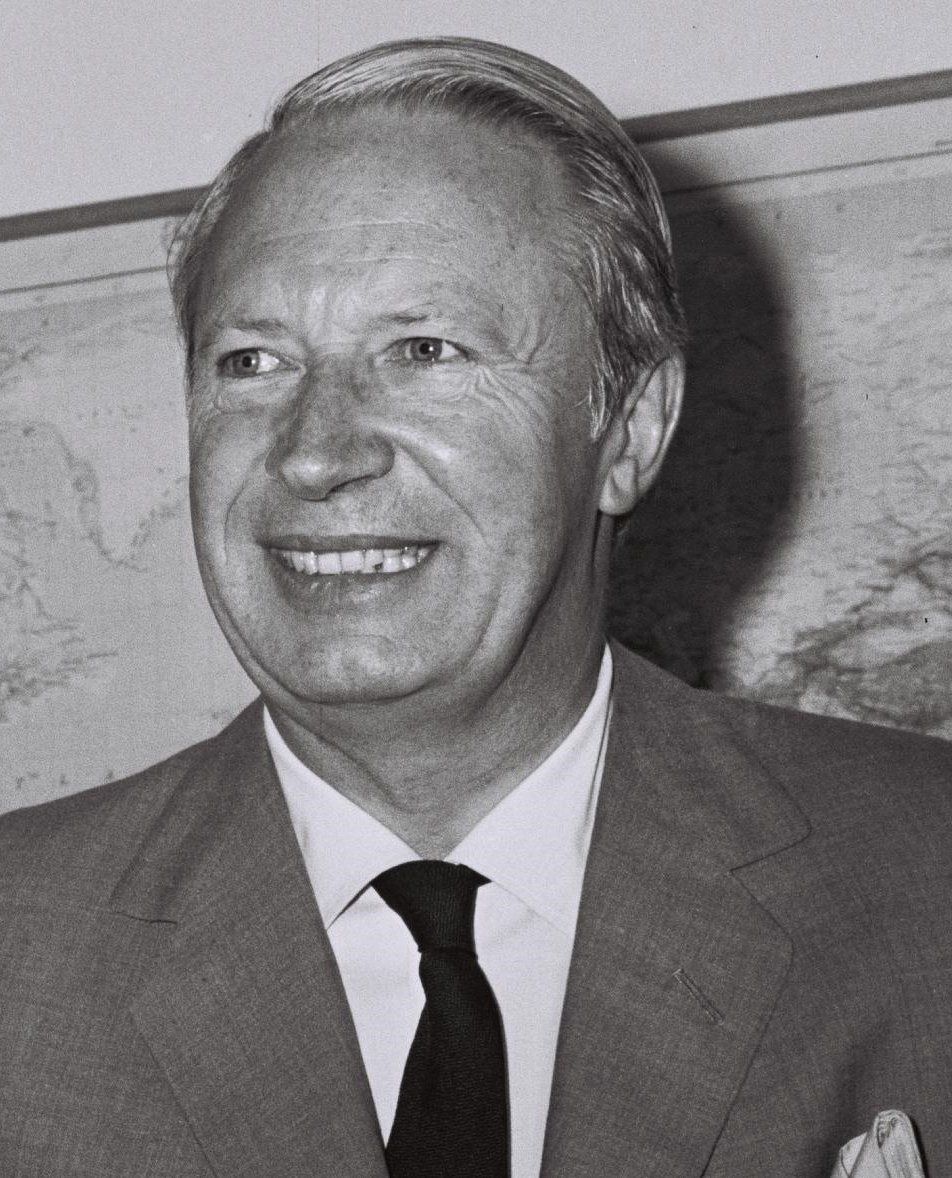
UK Prime Minister Heath

- British Prime Minister Edward Heath told the House of Commons that his government had issued an order mandating a three-day work week for industries in the United Kingdom, to take effect on January 1, in order to reduce the consumption of electricity and the demands on coal and oil supplies. Heath, who cited labor strikes by railway workers and coal miners, also announced that the nation's television stations would be required to sign off the air every evening at 10:30 p.m., beginning on December 17.
- An explosion killed more than 80 teenagers staying at a factory dormitory in the town of Tachov in Czechoslovakia. The victims were all apprentice factory workers at a plastic manufacturing company and were sleeping inside the two-story building when the blast occurred at 3:15 in the morning.
- Egypt's Lieutenant General Saad el-Shazly, praised as a hero in the initial days of the Yom Kippur War, was removed from his position as Chief of Staff of the Egyptian Armed Forces after a dispute with President Anwar Sadat.
- The latest U.S. Air Force jet fighter, the F-16, commonly called the "Viper" though identified as the "Fighting Falcon", was introduced by the General Dynamics Corporation.
- Claude Vorilhon, a French sports-car test driver and journalist, moved into a new career after experiencing, as he described it, an encounter with an extraterrestrial being while in a secluded area. Within a year, he published his first book, Le Livre Qui Dit La Verité ("The Book That Tells the Truth") would change his name to "Raël", and establish his own cult.
- Born: Christie Clark, American TV actor known for her regular role, from 1986 to 2019, on Days of Our Lives; in Los Angeles
- Died: Monica Brewster, 87, New Zealand patron of the arts and benefactor of the Govett-Brewster Art Gallery

== December 14, 1973 (Friday) ==
- A group of three researchers from West Germany's Schering Pharmaceutical Company announced in the science magazine Nature that they had found "a simple, practical technique" of separating sperm with the X chromosome from that with the Y chromosome, a process described by the Reuters news agency as "a development of wide implication for human and animal genetics."
- France's Finance Minister (and future President), Valery Giscard d'Estaing, announced that his government had agreed to accept the massive collection of paintings, sculptures, lithographs and pottery accumulated by Pablo Picasso, relieving Picasso's heirs from payment of inheritance tax. The donation did not include the artwork of Picasso himself.
- Born: Thuy Trang, Vietnamese actress, in Saigon (died 2001)
- Died: Bill Enis, 39, American sportscaster, died of a heart attack.

== December 15, 1973 (Saturday) ==
- The Trustees of the American Psychiatric Association (APA) voted, 13 to 0, to remove homosexuality from the APA's list of mental illnesses described in its upcoming edition of Diagnostic and Statistical Manual of Mental Disorders (DSM-II). The resolution, introduced by Dr. Robert L. Spitzer and endorsed by APA President Alfred Freedman, declared that "by itself, homosexuality does not meet the criteria for being a psychiatric disorder" and resolved that the APA "will no longer insist on a label of sickness for individuals who insist that they are well and demonstrate no generalized impairment in social effectiveness." The American Psychological Association had revised its own works in 1972, removing homosexuality from being identified as a form of "abnormal psychology."
- A Lockheed L-1049 Super Constellation cargo plane crashed into a neighborhood shortly after taking off from the Miami International Airport, killing six people on the ground and all three of the crew. The leased aircraft was carrying a cargo of christmas trees to Venezuela, and impacted on the 3100 block of NW 30th Street at 11:53 p.m.
- Kidnappers in Italy freed J. Paul Getty III, the 17-year-old grandson of the person who was, at the time, the wealthiest man in the world. The teenager, whose captors had cut off his ear while he was held hostage, was found on the side of a country road near the town of Lagonegro, almost 100 miles (160 km) south of Naples, after payment of a $2.9 million ransom.
- U.S. President Nixon signed the Emergency Daylight Saving Time Energy Conservation Act, a bill providing for daylight saving time year round, into law. With clocks to be set forward one hour to standard time on January 6, rather than on the last Sunday in April.
- Dundee defeated Celtic, 1 to 0, to win the Scottish League Cup before almost 28,000 spectators at Hampden Park in Glasgow.
- Born: Surya Bonaly, French-born figure skater with five consecutive European ladies' singles championships from 1991 to 1995; in Nice

== December 16, 1973 (Sunday) ==
- All 51 people aboard Aeroflot Flight 2022 were killed when the Tupolev Tu-124 crashed in the Soviet Union near Karacharovo while approaching Moscow on a flight from Vilnius, at the time in the Lithuanian SSR. The Soviet press did not report the disaster, but Soviet officials informed the West German embassy in Moscow of the death of a German national on the airplane. Four of the passengers were Lithuanian physicians who were flying from Vilnius to a conference in Kursk.

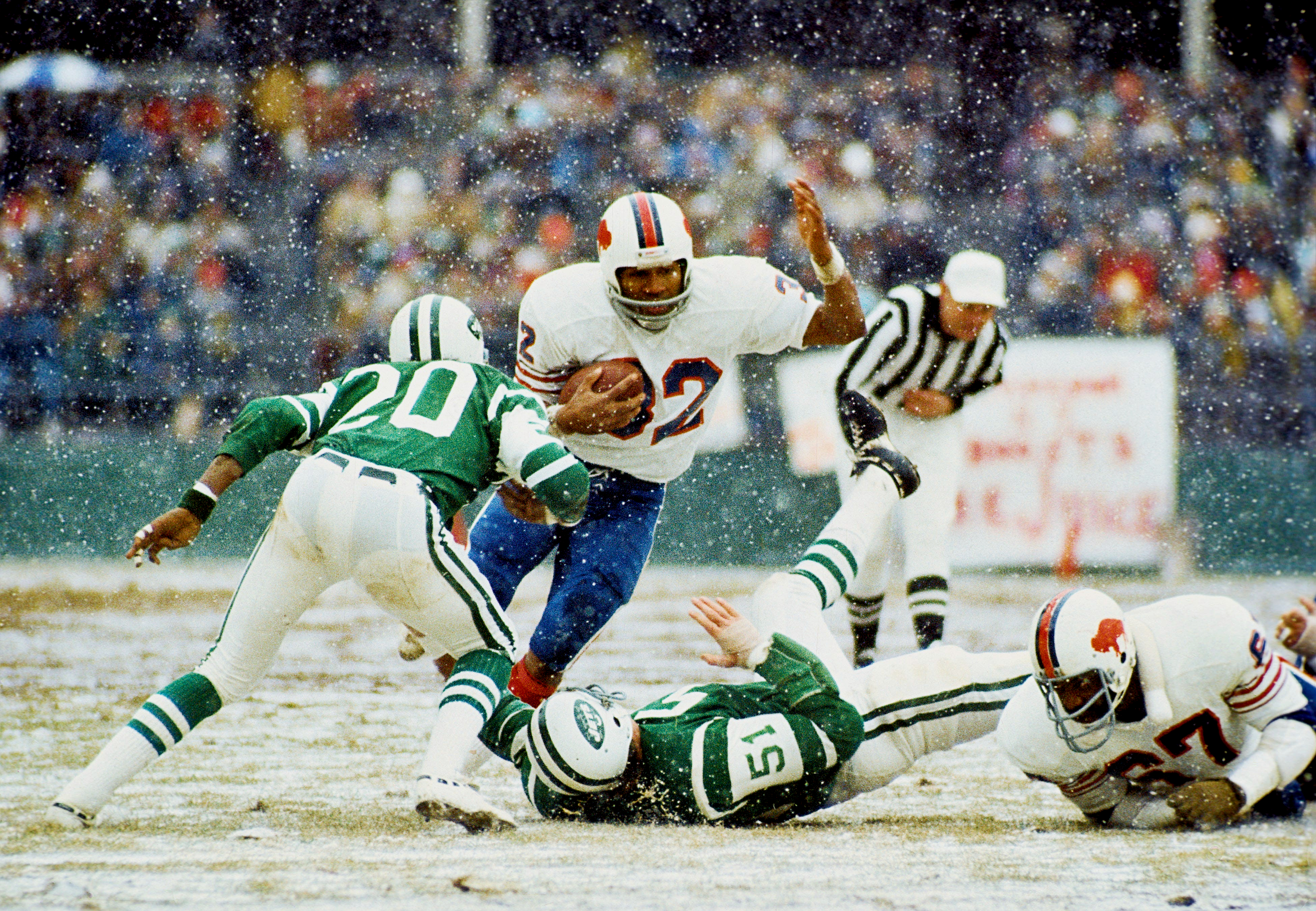
Simpson breaking the record

- O. J. Simpson of the Buffalo Bills became the first player to rush for more than 2,000 yards in a pro football season, finishing the year with 2,003 after rushing exactly 200 yards in a 34 to 14 win over the New York Jets. With 1,803 yards before the start of the 14th and final game, Simpson broke Jim Brown's 1963 record of 1,863 yards rushing in the first quarter.
- Fernando Pascoal Neves, better known as "Pavão", was playing as a midfielder for FC Porto against Vitória F.C., in a match in Portugal's Primeira Liga. Just 13 minutes into the match before a home crowd, Pavão, a member of the Portuguese national team, collapsed on the field and died of a heart attack.
- The political party Partido de la Liberación Dominicana (PLD), which would later dominate the Dominican Republic, was founded by former president Juan Bosch. By 1996, Leonel Fernández would become the first PLD member to be elected president.
- The bicentennial of the Boston Tea Party of 1773 was celebrated in Boston. In a scheduled presentation, a group of men in colonial period costuming climbed aboard the replica ship Beaver II and tossed crates labeled 'Tea" into the harbor. A few minutes later, an unscheduled protest followed as a group of people calling themselves the "People's Bicentennial Commission" boarded the same ship and tossed empty oil barrels overboard.
- Died: Sid Barnes, 57, Australian cricketer and batsman with 163 caps for the Australian national side, was found dead of an overdose of barbiturate.

== December 17, 1973 (Monday) ==
- Palestinian terrorists killed 32 people after seizing the terminal building at the Leonardo da Vinci Airport near Rome, then throwing grenades through the open doors of a Pan American Boeing 707 which had 177 people on board. Pan Am Flight 110 had been preparing to taxi for departure. Two of the civilian deaths took place inside the airport terminal. Another group of five gunmen stormed a Lufthansa Boeing 737, bringing aboard 10 hostages and also taking hostage the crew of four.
- Canada and Denmark signed a treaty delimiting the division of their territorial waters between Canada's northernmost region (Ellesmere Island, now part of the Canadian Territory of Nunavut) and Greenland, now a self-governing Danish "constituent country". The treaty did not resolve the claims by both Canada and Denmark to the uninhabited Hans Island.
- The Woody Allen film Sleeper, a satire film starring Allen as a cryogenically frozen man waking up in the year 2173, premiered with a screening in the United States.
- The British Broadcasting Company introduced "Radio Scotland" on its BBC Radio 4 station, initially as an hourly news segment and "a two-hour current affairs programme" every morning. The success of the program would lead to the founding of BBC Radio Scotland as a full-time network on November 23, 1978.
- Born:
  - Rian Johnson, American filmmaker known for directing Star Wars: The Last Jedi in 2017; in Silver Spring, Maryland
  - Paula Radcliffe, English long-distance runner and three-time winner of the women's division of the London Marathon (2002, 2003, 2005) and of the New York Marathon (2004, 2007, 2008); in Davenham, Cheshire
  - Martha Érika Alonso, Mexican politician who served for 10 days as governor of the state of Puebla before being killed in a helicopter crash after her inauguration; in Tecamachalco, Puebla (died 2018)
- Died: Patrick Hadley, 74, British classical music composer

== December 18, 1973 (Tuesday) ==
- The Soviet Union launched Soyuz 13 into orbit as the first crewed mission to be tracked by the new RKA Mission Control Center, based in the Moscow suburb of Kaliningrad (now Korolyov in Russia). The launch marked the first time in Earth spaceflight that American astronauts (Gerald Carr, William Pogue and Edward Gibson on Skylab 4) and Soviet cosmonauts (Pyotr Klimuk and Valentin Lebedev on Soyuz 12) were in outer space at the same time. An unprecedented five people would be in orbit over the next eight days until the return of Soyuz 12 to Earth on December 26. The Soviet mission carried the Orion 2 Space Observatory.
- Having seized a Lufthansa airplane in Rome and murdering one hostage, Palestinian terrorists ordered the crew to fly to Athens, and then to Damascus and Kuwait, where the five hijackers released their 12 hostages and were allowed to leave the plane. More than a year later, the hijackers were turned over by Kuwait to the Palestine Liberation Organisation, which had promised to put the group on trial for carrying out an "unauthorized operation". Their subsequent fate remains unknown.
- The Islamic Development Bank was created as a specialized agency of the Organisation of the Islamic Conference, effective August 12, 1974.

== December 19, 1973 (Wednesday) ==
- All 40 crew died when the Oriental Monarch, a Liberian-registered cargo ship, foundered in the north Pacific Ocean, 150 nautical miles (170 mi) off the coast of British Columbia.
- All 109 people aboard a Lufthansa jetliner were able to escape alive after the Boeing 707 crashed at New Delhi and burst into flames. Ten people had minor injuries.
- A group of 2,261 delegates in Thailand gathered at the Royal Turf Club, a horseracing track in Bangkok, to select 299 of their group to serve in a constitutional assembly. All of the delegates had been picked by King Bhumibol Adulyadej "with careful attention paid to making it a representative cross-section of prince-to-peasant among Thailand's 34 million people." The track's parimutuel computer, normally used to calculate wagers and returns, identified the 299 candidates who received the most votes.
- Ten railway commuters were killed and 94 injured when the train they were on derailed in the London suburb of Ealing while en route from London to Oxford. The train was crowded with almost 600 people when the locomotive and the first four-passenger cars ran off the rails, struck and embankment, and overturned.
- Born: Zulfiya Zabirova, Uzbek professional cyclist and 1996 Olympic gold medalist for the women's time trial event, later the 2002 world champion in the same event; in Tashkent, Uzbek SSR, Soviet Union
- Died: Povilas Plechavičius, 83, former commander of the Army of Lithuania, and leader of the 1926 military coup d'état that overthrew President Kazys Grinius

== December 20, 1973 (Thursday) ==
- Spain's Prime Minister Luis Carrero Blanco was assassinated in Madrid by the Basque terrorist organization ETA, which had set a bomb on a street and detonated it as Carrero was departing Mass at the Church of San Francisco de Borja in Madrid. Carrero was killed along with his chauffeur and a police bodyguard. Torcuato Fernandez Miranda was appointed as the interim premier until a permanent replacement could be selected. Investigators learned that the assassins had rented a basement apartment across from the church and dug a tunnel to a point under the street in order to place explosives beneath Carrero's route. Police identified Jose Benaran as the person who detonated the bomb, and Jose Abaitua as the person who dug the tunnel
- Thirteen harness racing drivers were arrested for allegedly conspiring to fix Superfecta races at Roosevelt and Yonkers Raceways in New York.
- The U.S. House of Representatives voted, 355 to 4, to pass the Endangered Species Act of 1973. The only opposing votes were from Congressmen Earl Landgrebe of Indiana, H. R. Gross of Iowa, Robin Beard of Tennessee and Bob Price of Texas.
- Died: Bobby Darin (stage name for Walden Robert Cassotto), 37, American pop music singer, died after heart surgery to repair artificial heart valves he had received almost three years earlier.

== December 21, 1973 (Friday) ==
- The Geneva Conference opened under the auspices of the United Nations, in an attempt to negotiate a solution to the Arab–Israeli conflict. From the conference, disengagement agreements would be worked out in 1974 between Israel, Egypt and Syria, and an agreement on the Sinai peninsula in 1975.
- The Cancer Letter, an influential weekly magazine, was launched by Jerry D. Boyd of the National Information Service company.
- Born: Tomasz Sikora, Polish biathlete and Olympic gold medalist; in Wodzisław Śląski
  - Anita Lerche, Danish multilingual pop singer; in Glostrup, near Copenhagen
- Died: James Kennedy GC, 42, Scottish security guard for British Rail Engineering Limited, was killed while trying to prevent a payroll robbery

== December 22, 1973 (Saturday) ==
- All 106 people aboard a Royal Air Maroc flight were killed when the Sud Aviation SE-210 Caravelle was preparing to land at Tangier in Morocco on a flight from Paris in France. The aircraft crashed into the side of Mount Mellaline, near the town of Tetouan, at an altitude of 2,300 feet (700 m).
- U.S. President Nixon signed the Menominee Restoration Act into law, returning federally recognized sovereignty to the Menominee Indian Tribe of the U.S. state of Wisconsin, and reversing the Menominee Termination Act of 1954.
- Born: Nikolai Arkadievich Dudin, Soviet Russian serial killer of 13 people in the small town of Furmanov between 1987 and 2002; in
- Died: Dewey Brown, 74, the first African-American member of the Professional Golfers' Association of America (PGA). Brown was a member from 1928 until 1934, when the PGA amended its bylaws to limit itself to white members only. The "Caucasian only" clause stood until 1961; Brown was readmitted to the PGA in 1965.

== December 23, 1973 (Sunday) ==
- The Organization of Petroleum Exporting Countries (OPEC) announced that its member nations would more than double the price asked for crude oil, effective January 1. In U.S. dollars, the posted price went from $5.11 per barrel to $11.65 on New Year's Day of 1974. At the start of 1973, the price had been $2.59 per barrel.
- Gérald Fauteux, Chief Justice of Canada since 1970, retired from the Canadian Supreme Court, on which he had served for 24 years.
- Died:
  - Gerard Kuiper, 68, Dutch astronomer for whom the Kuiper belt of dwarf planets, located beyond the planet Neptune, would later be named
  - Irna Phillips, 72, American scriptwriter who pioneered the daytime soap opera on radio, then later on television

== December 24, 1973 (Monday) ==
- In the U.S., the District of Columbia (including the nation's capital, Washington, D.C.), was granted limited self-government including the right to elect a mayor and a 13-member city council, as U.S. President Nixon signed the District of Columbia Home Rule Act into law. For more than 100 years, the administration of the district services had been carried out by a subcommittee of the U.S. House of Representatives. Congress still retained the right to veto the budget for the District.
- At least 143 passengers and crew died when the Jambeli, an overcrowded ferryboat, sank on Christmas Eve in shark-infested waters off of the coast of Ecuador. Over 300 people were on the 160-person capacity boat when it capsized in the Gulf of Guayaquil off of the island of Puna; 142 people were rescued by other ships or were able to swim ashore. The Jambeli had departed Puerto Bolívar the night before en route to Guayaquil."
- Mohammad Mohammadullah became the acting president of Bangladesh upon the resignation of President Abu Sayeed Chowdhury. Mohammadullah would be elected president one month later and serve until January 25, 1975.
- Henck Arron became the Prime Minister of Suriname, at the time a constituent part of the Kingdom of the Netherlands, in advance of the South American nation's independence on November 25, 1975.
- An annular solar eclipse occurred over Central America and the northern nations of South America. Lasting 12 minutes and 2 seconds, it was shorter than the record 12 minute, 9 second eclipse of December 14, 1955, but still longer than any eclipse to occur before January 14, 3080.
- Born:
  - Stephenie Meyer, American novelist known for the Twilight series of seven fantasy novels; in Hartford, Connecticut
  - Matt Tebbutt, British chef and TV host; in High Wycombe, Buckinghamshire
- Died:
  - Periyar (Erode Venkatappa Ramasamy), 94, Indian social activist and founder of the Dravidian movement
  - Sergei Chakhotin, 90, Turkish-born Soviet Russian surgeon and organizational theorist

== December 25, 1973 (Tuesday) ==
- Meeting on Christmas Day in Kuwait, the Arab OPEC nations announced that they would end monthly production cuts to all but two world nations, with the flow of oil to be increased by 10% for Japan, as well as the UK, France, Belgium and other European nations. The embargo continued, however, against the United States and the Netherlands.

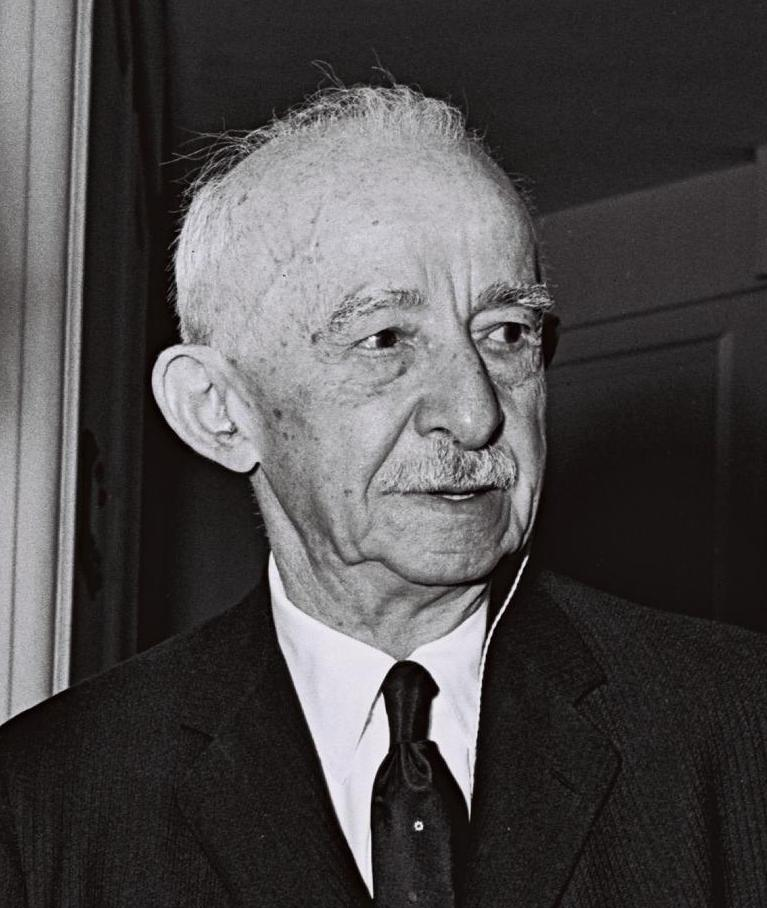
İnönü

- Born: Eruani Azibapu Godbless, Nigerian physician, entrepreneur and billionaire; in Epibu, Bayelsa State
- Died:
  - İsmet İnönü, 89, Turkish Army General, former Prime Minister and President of Turkey
  - Gabriel Voisin, 93, French aviation pioneer
  - Maurício Grabois, 61, Brazilian politician and co-founder of the Communist Party of Brazil, was shot and killed along with several other anti-government Araguaia guerrillas.

== December 26, 1973 (Wednesday) ==
- U.S. President Nixon became the only incumbent American president to fly on a commercial airliner, as he, wife Pat and daughter Tricia Nixon Cox boarded United Air Lines Flight 55 at Washington's Dulles International Airport and traveled across the country to the Los Angeles International Airport. During the flight, Nixon sat in the first class section of the DC-10 and then surprised passengers by walking down the aisle to the back of the aircraft to shake hands.
- Long Boret took office as the sixth, and last, Prime Minister of Khmer Republic in Cambodia, after accepting an appointment by President Lon Nol to form a government to succeed In Tam. He tried, unsuccessfully, to negotiate peace with the Khmer Rouge invaders during the Cambodian Civil War, and elected to stay in Phnom Penh while other officials were able to escape before the Communist takeover of the Asian nation. He would be arrested and executed on April 17, 1975.
- The eight-day spaceflight of Soyuz 13 ended with cosmonauts Pyotr Klimuk and Valentin Lebedev landing early, apparently because of a malfunction in the capsule's equipment. The ship landed in a heavy snowstorm near Karaganda in the Kazakh SSR.
- The controversial horror film The Exorcist, directed by William Friedkin and starring Ellen Burstyn and Linda Blair, premiered in the United States.
- Died: Harold B. Lee, 74, U.S. religious leader, 11th President of The Church of Jesus Christ of Latter-day Saints. Lee was succeeded by Spencer W. Kimball on December 31.

== December 27, 1973 (Thursday) ==
- William E. Simon, the director of the U.S. Federal Energy Office, outlined a gasoline rationing program that he emphasized was not being implemented but that would be "on standby" and that would not be implemented earlier than March 1, 1974, subject to approval by Congress. Under the rationing plan, each licensed driver 18 years old or over would be issued a coupon to purchase 35 gallons per month of gasoline, with the right to purchase extra coupons at a higher price or from other drivers.
- The island of Basilan was made one of the provinces of the Philippines by Presidential Decree No. 356 of Ferdinand Marcos, effective March 7, 1974.
- Died:
  - Thomas Niedermayer, 45, West German industrialist and West Germany's honorary consul to Northern Ireland, was kidnapped from his home in West Belfast by two members of the IRA. His body would not be located until 1980. John Bradley would plead guilty to manslaughter in 1981.
  - Lucy Partington, 21, British student and cousin of novelist Martin Amis, was abducted and murdered by serial killers Fred and Rosemary West. Her fate would not be confirmed until the discovery of her remains more than 20 years later, in 1994.

== December 28, 1973 (Friday) ==
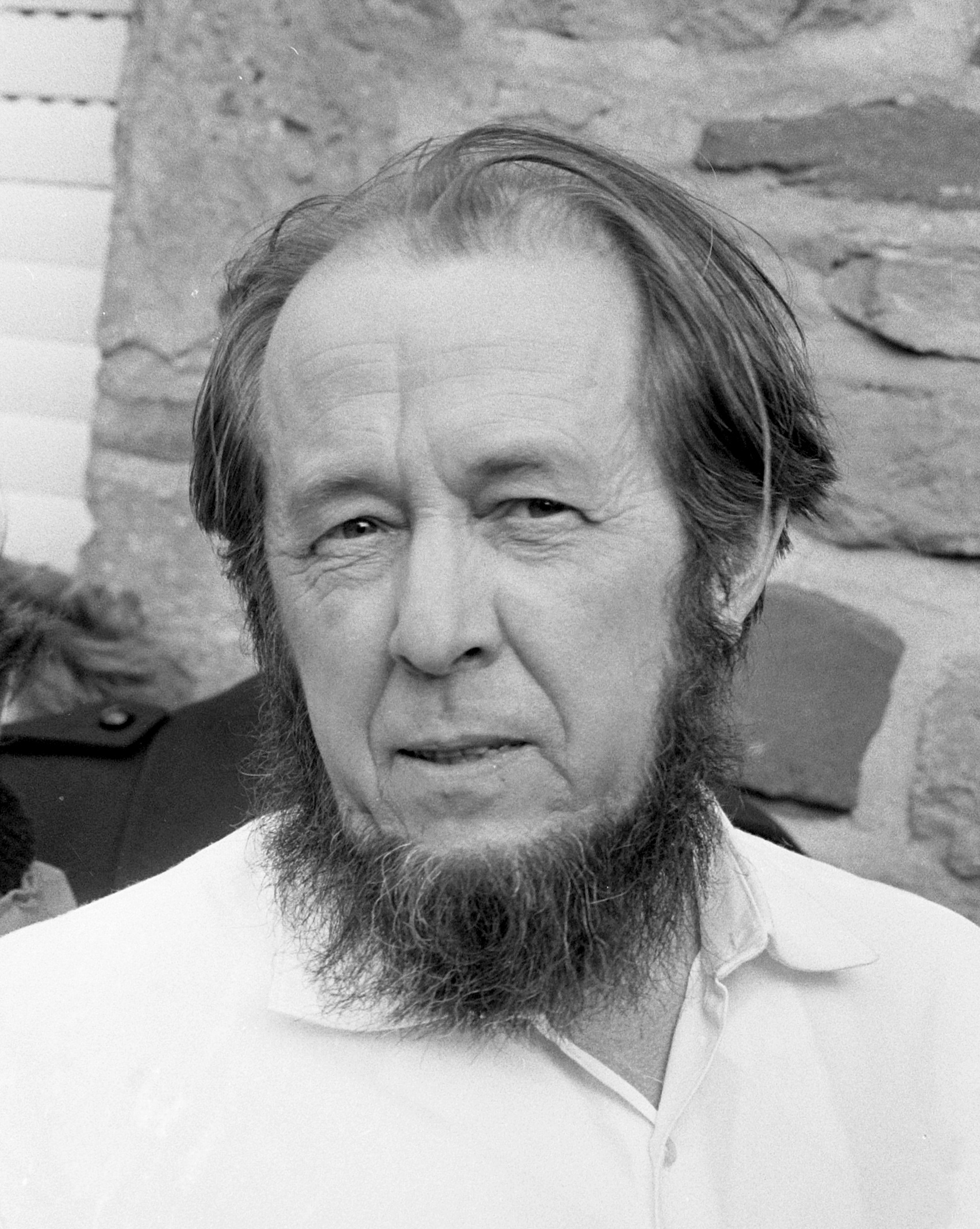
Solzhenitsyn

- Alexander Solzhenitsyn's book The Gulag Archipelago was published for the first time, as the book about Soviet prison camps was put on sale by a French company, Éditions du Seuil of Paris. The manuscript had been smuggled out of the U.S.S.R. and translated into the French language.
- The Endangered Species Act of 1973 was signed into law by U.S. President Nixon, after having passed the Senate on a voice vote on December 9, and by the House of Representatives on December 20, by a margin of 355 to 4. Nixon also signed the Comprehensive Employment and Training Act (CETA) into law to train workers for jobs in public service, in a program that would last for nine years until replaced by the Job Training Partnership Act of 1982.
- The eagerly-anticipated Comet Kohoutek made its closest approach to the Sun and, though at its brightest, was not visible from Earth because it was directly on the opposite side of the Sun, making "Kohoutek" synonymous with disappointment.
- Born: Fatuma Roba, Ethiopian long-distance runner and 1996 Olympic gold medalist in the women's marathon, winner of the Boston Marathon three consecutive times (1997, 1998 and 1999); in Bekoji
- Died: Rasheed Turabi, 65, Pakistani Shia Islamic scholar

== December 29, 1973 (Saturday) ==
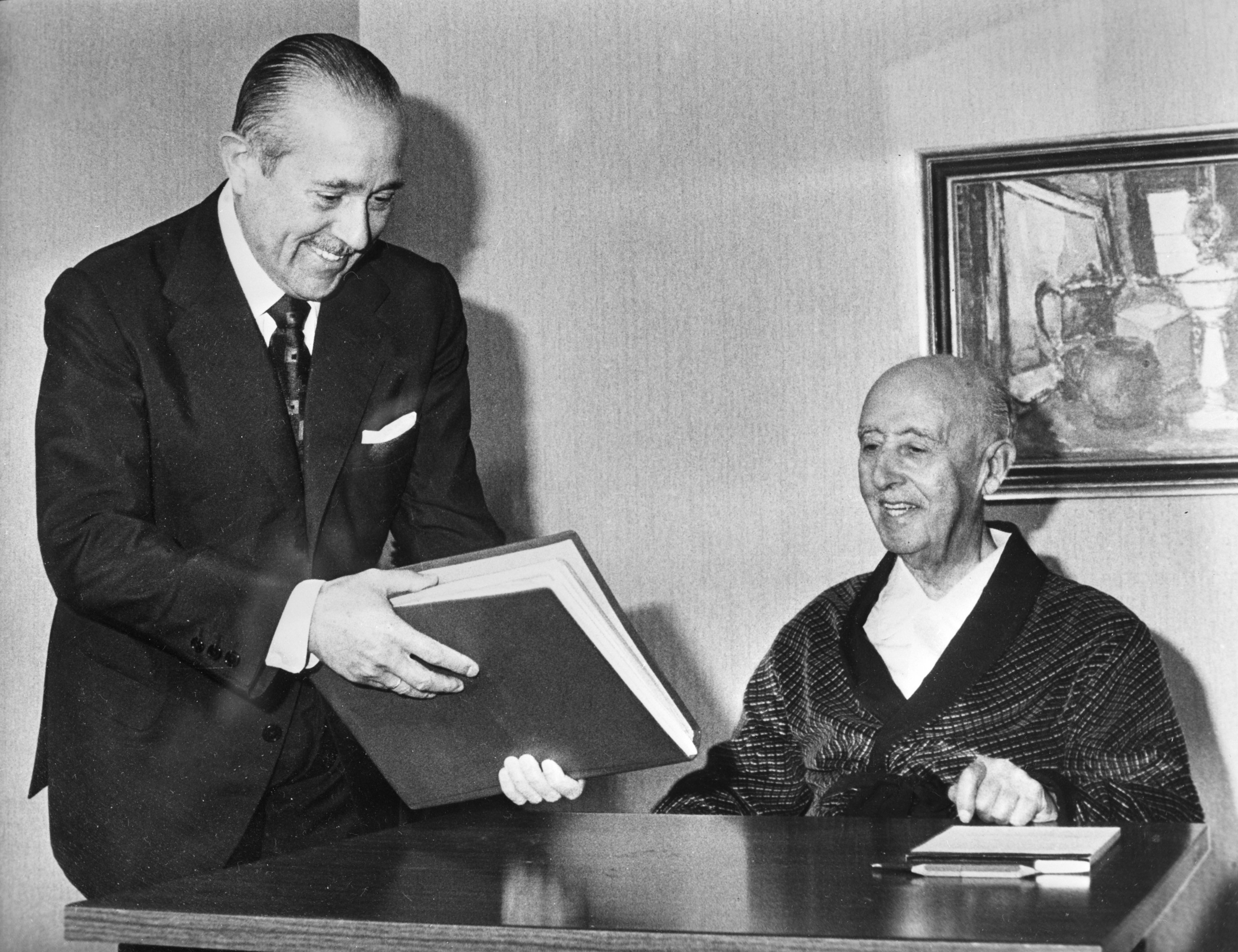
Arias and Franco

- Carlos Arias Navarro was named as the new Prime Minister of Spain by the Chief of State, Generalissimo Francisco Franco.
- The "HMO" was created in the U.S. as the Health Maintenance Organization Act of 1973 was signed into law by U.S. President Nixon.
- Born: Marama Davidson, New Zealander politician, Minister for the Prevention of Family and Sexual Violence, in Auckland
- Died:
  - Wang Zhiming, 66, Chinese missionary and Christian martyr, was publicly executed in Wuding in the Yunnan province, after having been imprisoned since 1969 for his outspoken criticism of the anti-religious campaigns of the Red Guards during the Cultural Revolution. He would be honored in 1998 at London's Westminster Abbey as one of the "ten modern martyrs of the 20th century", whose images are carved into the west door of the Abbey.
  - Cécile Cerf, 57, French Resistance fighter and humanitarian worker

== December 30, 1973 (Sunday) ==
- Terrorist plotter "Carlos the Jackal" ( Ilich Ramírez Sánchez) failed in his attempt to assassinate British businessman Joseph Sieff. Despite being shot in the face at point blank range, Sieff survived his injuries.
- The Minnesota Vikings and the Miami Dolphins won the NFC and AFC championships, respectively, by the same score, putting both into Super Bowl VIII, scheduled for January 13, 1974, in Houston. Minnesota beat Dallas, 27 to 10, and Miami defeated Oakland, 27 to 10.
- Born: Jason Behr, American film and TV actor known for the TV series Roswell; in Minneapolis, Minnesota
- Died: Chief Marshal Konstantin Vershinin, 73, commander-in-chief of the Soviet Air Force 1946-1949 and 1957-1969

== December 31, 1973 (Monday) ==
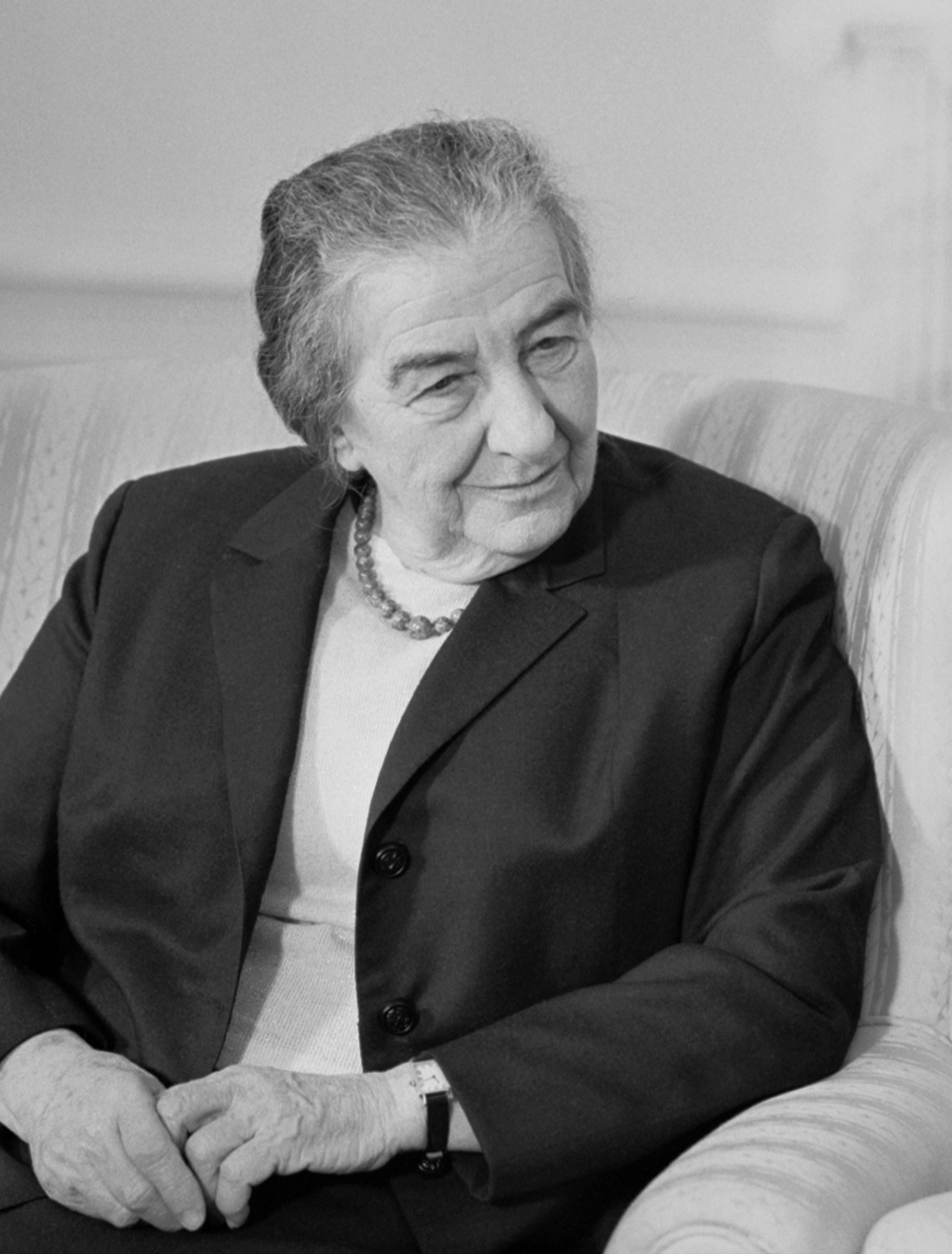
Meir

- Elections for the 120-seat Knesset took place in Israel. Prime Minister Golda Meir's Alignment party won 51 seats and its coalition partners, including the Mafdal won 16 seats to maintain a majority.
- In the United Kingdom, as a result of coal shortages caused by industrial action, the Three-Day Week electricity consumption reduction measure came into force at midnight. The three-day restriction, allowing manufacturers to use electricity on only three out of seven days in a week, would continue in effect until February 21.
- In a rare postseason meeting of two of the unbeaten and untied college football teams in the U.S., No. 1-ranked Alabama (11-0-0) met No. 4 Notre Dame (10-0-0) in the Sugar Bowl game in New Orleans. Notre Dame defeated Alabama, which had been named national champion by UPI on December 4, by a single point, 24–23.
- In Sydney, Australia, the heavy metal group AC/DC performed their first major concert, a New Year's Eve gala at the Bondi Lifesaver Club at Bondi Beach.
- Born: Khaled K. El-Hamedi, Libyan peace activist and founder of the International Organization for Peace, Care and Relief (IOPCR); in Tripoli
