= November 1973 =

Month of 1973

<<	November 1973					>>
Su	Mo	Tu	We	Th	Fr	Sa
				1	2	3
4	5	6	7	8	9	10
11	12	13	14	15	16	17
18	19	20	21	22	23	24
25	26	27	28	29	30

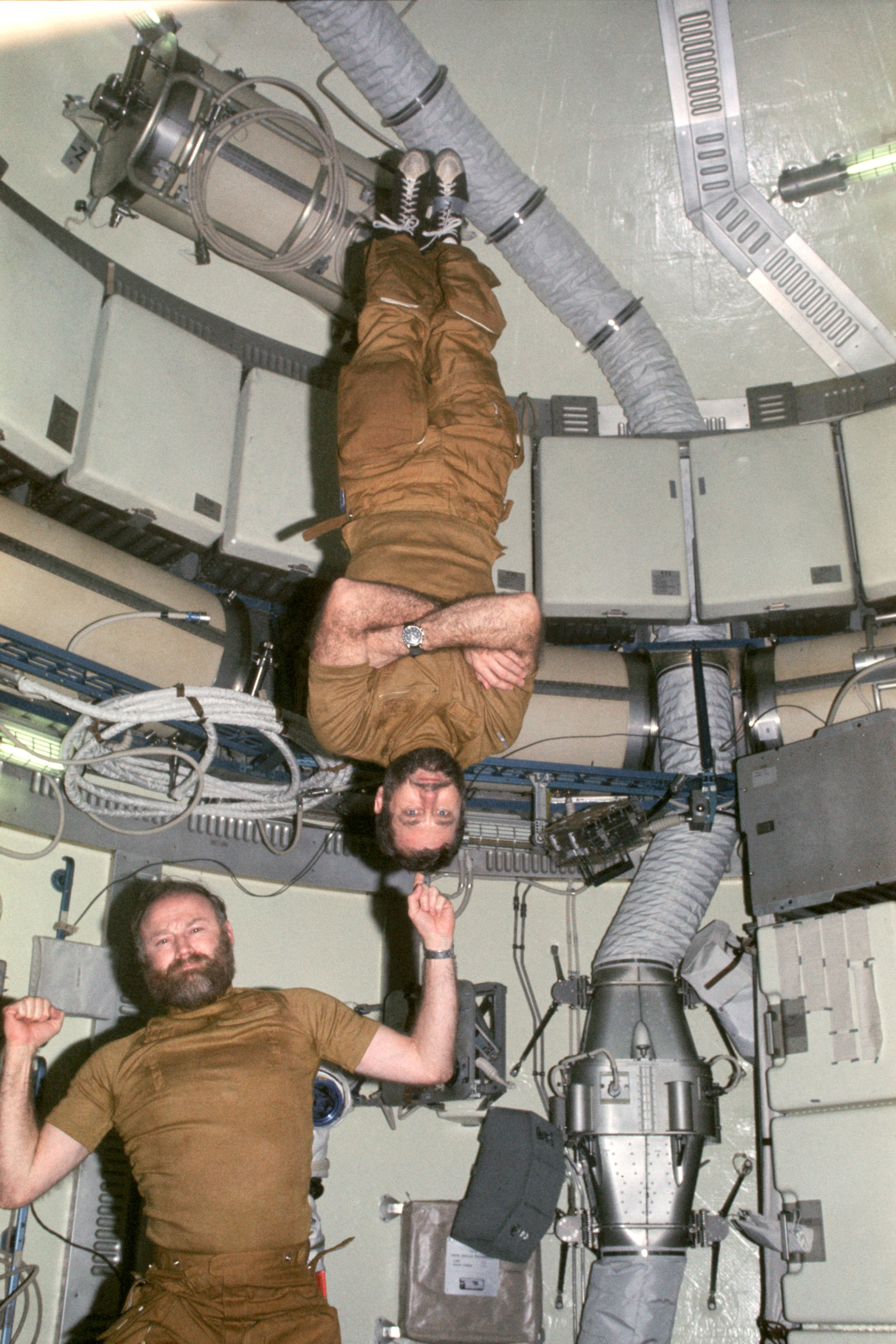
November 16, 1973: Final U.S. mission to Skylab space station launched with U.S. astronauts William Pogue (top), Gerald Carr (bottom) and Ed Gibson (not pictured)

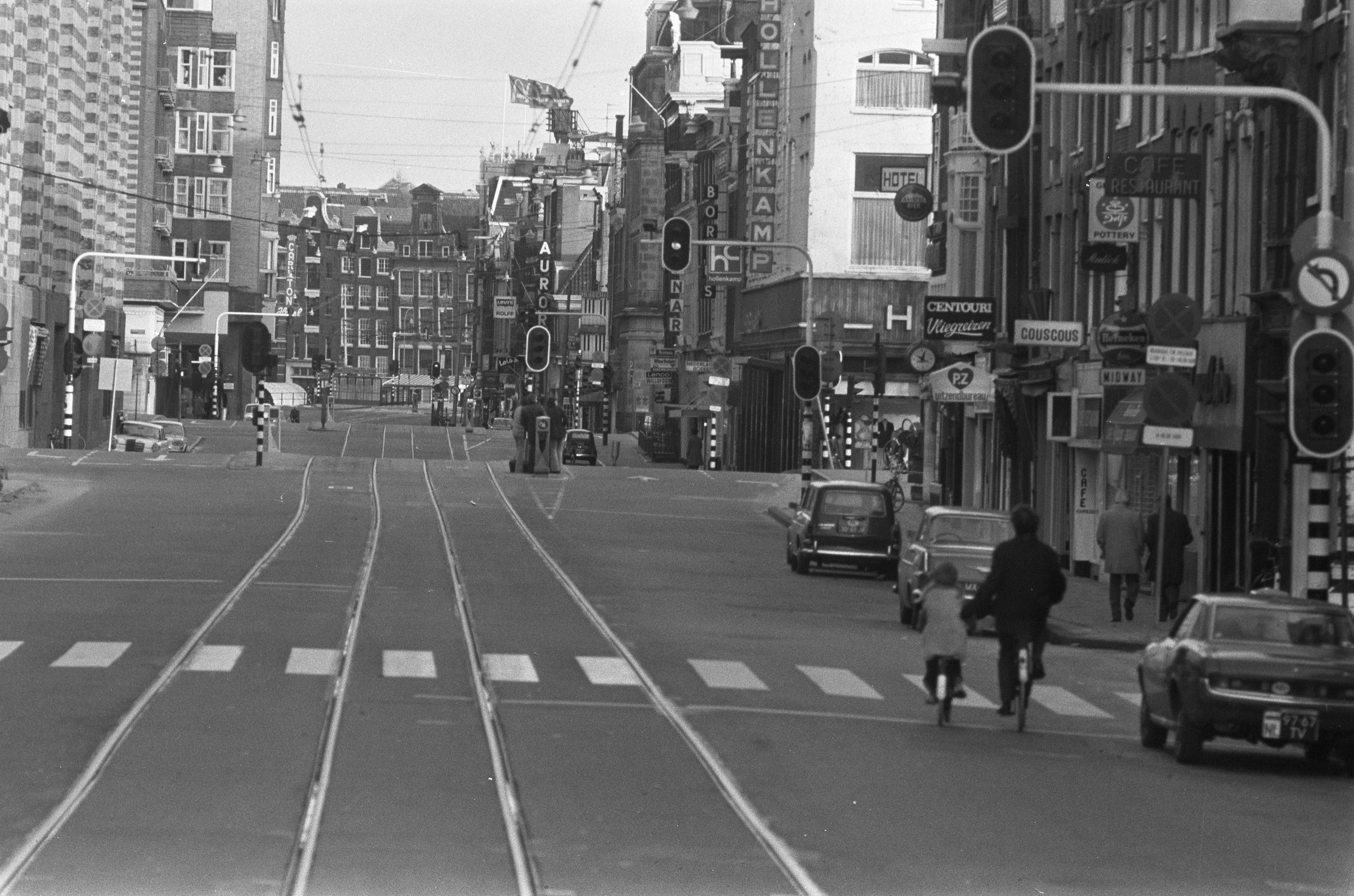
November 4, 1973: Netherlands becomes the first nation to inaugurate "driverless Sundays" to conserve fuel

The following events occurred in November 1973:

== November 1, 1973 (Thursday) ==
- The acting Attorney General of the United States, Robert Bork, appointed Leon Jaworski as the new Watergate Special Prosecutor to replace Archibald Cox, who had been fired on orders of U.S. President Nixon on October 20. Jaworski accepted after Nixon pledged that he would not attempt to interfere with the prosecutor's duties, and that he would not fire the prosecutor without a consensus of leaders in the U.S. Congress.
- North Korea seized the 10-man crew of the Japanese freighter Shinryu Maru, charging that the boat had "intruded deep into the territorial waters of our country" and that electronic equipment had been found aboard.
- On the 17th anniversary of its formation as a state of India, the Mysore State was given its current name, the state of Karnataka. The union territory of The Laccadive, Minicoy, and Amindivi Islands, also observing its 17th anniversary, was renamed Lakshadweep.
- Waterloo Lutheran University (WLU), located in Waterloo, Ontario in Canada, was renamed Wilfrid Laurier University (WLU) in honor of the late Sir Wilfrid Laurier, who had been Prime Minister of Canada from 1896 to 1911. The name change had been approved by the Waterloo Lutheran board of governors on June 12, 1973. and formally announced a month later
- Born: Li Xiaoshuang, Chinese gymnast and Olympic gold medalist in 1992 and 1996; in Xiantao, Hubei province
- Died: Ida Silverman, 91, Russian-born Jewish American philanthropist

== November 2, 1973 (Friday) ==
- The United Nations General Assembly voted, 93 to 7, to recognize the independence of Guinea-Bissau, the former colony of Portuguese Guinea, which had made a unilateral declaration in September.
- The IMCO Conference for Marine Pollution, attended by 665 delegates from 79 countries, ended in London with the adoption of the MARPOL (Marine Pollution) convention.
- Moscow police foiled the hijacking of Aeroflot Flight 19 after four armed men took control of the Yak-40 shuttle jet as it was approaching the city of Bryansk on a flight from Moscow. The hijackers diverted the airplane back to Moscow's Vnukovo Airport and held the 24 passengers and three crew hostage, demanding to be flown to Sweden and to be paid 1.5 million dollars in U.S. currency. Under the direction of KGB Director Yuri Andropov and Internal Affairs Minister Nikolai Shchelokov, a four-member police team stormed the aircraft. Two hijackers were killed, but the passengers and crew were rescued.
- Six of the 16 people aboard a Colombian airliner were killed in the crash of a La Urraca Airlines flight as it made an emergency landing at Villavicencio.

== November 3, 1973 (Saturday) ==
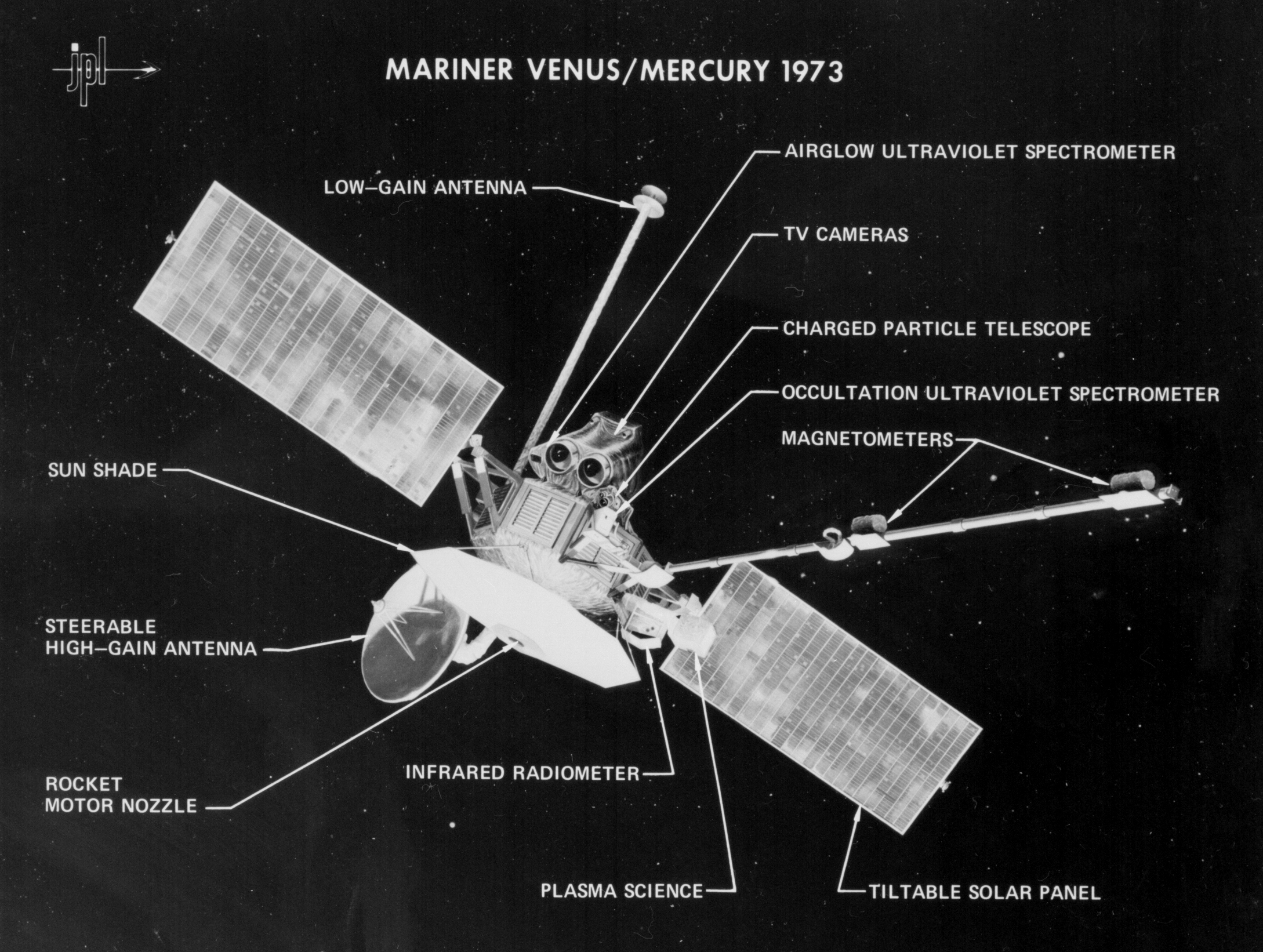
Mariner 10

- At 12:45 (0545 UTC) in the morning local time, NASA launched Mariner 10 toward the planet Mercury. On March 29, 1974, the Mariner would become the first space probe to reach that planet).
- A passenger on National Airlines Flight 27 was blown out of the window of an airplane at an altitude of 39,000 feet (12,000 m) over the U.S. state of New Mexico, after the number 3 engine on the Douglas DC-10-10, exploded and fragments penetrated the fuselage. The jet had been en route from Houston to Las Vegas when the accident happened at 4:40 in the afternoon, and made a safe emergency landing in Albuquerque, New Mexico. According to the subsequent NTSB investigation, the cockpit voice recorder showed that the engine explosion happened immediately after the first officer asked the captain "Wonder— wonder if you pull the N1 tach will that— autothrottle respond to N1?" and the captain replied, "Gee, I don't know." The first officer then said "You want to try it and see?" Thirty-four seconds later, the explosion happened. An extensive search was unable to locate the passenger, machinist George F. Gardner of Beaumont, Texas, who had been sitting by the window in seat 17F.
- The crash of a Greyhound bus in Sacramento, California killed 13 people, including the driver, and injured the other 31 people on board after striking a bridge support at a speed of 90 miles per hour (140 km/h). The bus had been chartered by the "Variety Swingers", all residents of Richmond, California, and was returning from a day of gambling in Reno, Nevada.
- Arnold Taylor of South Africa won the World Boxing Association bantamweight championship in Johannesburg by knocking out titleholder Romeo Anaya of Mexico in the 14th round.
- Born:
  - Ben Fogle, British adventurer and TV presenter; in London, the son of actress Julia Foster.
  - Ana Milán (stage name for Ana García Milán), Spanish journalist and TV presenter; in Alicante

== November 4, 1973 (Sunday) ==
- The first "no driving Sunday" went into effect in the Netherlands as part of the Western European nation's attempt to conserve fuel during the Arab oil embargo. The only exceptions were emergency vehicles, taxis, public buses and motor vehicles with foreign license plates.
- The Gigantinho sports arena was opened in Porto Alegre, Brazil.
- Died: Dr. Haim G. Ginott, 51, Israeli-American child psychologist, newspaper columnist and author, died after a long illness.

== November 5, 1973 (Monday) ==
- United States Secretary of State Henry Kissinger began his "shuttle diplomacy" initiative between Tel Aviv, Cairo and Damascus to negotiate a Middle East peace treaty. to facilitate the cessation of hostilities following the Yom Kippur War.
- San Francisco's first subway, the Bay Area Rapid Transit (BART) service through a tunnel beneath San Francisco Bay, began with a train traveling between San Francisco and Daly City.
- At least 13 people were killed in a train crash, in Guntershausen, West Germany, near Kassel, after their passenger car was struck from behind by an express train.
- Born: Johnny Damon, American baseball player; in Fort Riley, Kansas
- Died: Alfred Romer, 79, American paleontologist

== November 6, 1973 (Tuesday) ==
- In Oakland, California, the assassination of school superintendent Marcus Foster was carried out by three members of a U.S. terrorist group, the Symbionese Liberation Army (SLA). Foster, who was shot multiple times, was the first African-American superintendent of schools for a major U.S. city. The white Deputy Superintendent, Robert W. Blackburn, was seriously wounded in the same attack. Two days later, the San Francisco Chronicle received a letter from the SLA, claiming responsibility for the shooting and declaring that Foster was "guilty of crimes against children and the lives of the people."
- Pioneer 10, launched from Earth on March 2, 1972, began returning its first photographs of the planet Jupiter, starting from 16 million miles (25 million kilometers). It would make its closest approach to the solar system's largest planet on December 3.
- The Israel Defense Forces revealed that the death toll from the recent Yom Kippur War had been far higher than expected, with 1,854 dead and nearly one out of every 400 residents of the Middle Eastern nation killed or wounded. In contrast, Syria had one out of every 884 citizens as casualties, and Egypt had one of every 4,550.
- U.S. financier Robert L. Vesco, who had fled to the Bahamas after being investigated for embezzlement in making a donation to President Nixon's re-election campaign, was arrested in Nassau on a U.S. federal extradition warrant.
- The Liberian supertanker SS Golar Patricia exploded and sank in the Atlantic Ocean, but 44 of the 45 people on board were rescued by the Spanish liner MV Cabo San Vicente.
- Died: George Biddle, 88, American mural painter

== November 7, 1973 (Wednesday) ==
- Both Houses of the U.S. Congress voted overwhelmingly to override President Richard Nixon's veto of the War Powers Resolution, and passed into law. The vote was 284 to 135 in the House of Representatives and 75 to 18 in the U.S. Senate.
- Near Lodi, California, at the U.S. community of Victor, serial killers Willie Steelman and Douglas Gretzler murdered nine people (including three children) in one household, the home of Walter and Joanne Parkin. The homicides followed eight other killings that had taken place in the preceding three weeks. After having killed 17 people starting on October 18, Steelman and Gretzler were arrested the day after the Parkin household massacre, after having committed the first of 17 murders over a 22-day period.

== November 8, 1973 (Thursday) ==
- The Second Cod War between the United Kingdom and Iceland was ended by agreement between the Prime Ministers of the two nations.
- Millennium '73, a three-day festival hosted by the 15-year-old Guru Maharaj Ji and his Divine Right Mission, drew 20,000 of his devotees to the Astrodome in Houston. The Guru called the festival "the most significant event in human history" and promised to launch 1,000 years of world peace.
- The British government made £146 million compensation available to three nationalized industries to cover losses resulting from its price restraint policies.
- The animated musical Robin Hood was released by Walt Disney Productions, with the characters re-imagined as anthropomorphic animals.
- Died: Faruk Nafiz Çamlıbel, 75, Turkish novelist and poet

== November 9, 1973 (Friday) ==
- The government-owned Philippine National Oil Company was founded.
- Musician Billy Joel released the album that would make him a star, Piano Man. The album was his second, after the poor-selling Cold Spring Harbor.
- Born:
  - Nick Lachey, American singer for the band 98 Degrees and TV personality; in Harlan, Kentucky
  - Alyson Court, Canadian voice actress; in Toronto
- Died: Pradyumansinhji Lakhajirajsinhji, 60, the Thakore Saheb 60, India's princely state of Rajkot from 1940 until the abolition of the title in 1971, as well as a first-class cricketer.

== November 10, 1973 (Saturday) ==
- The first act of arson by the future founders of the Animal Liberation Front was committed by Ronnie Lee and Cliff Goodman in the "new city" of Milton Keynes, Buckinghamshire in England. Lee and Goodman set fire to an unfinished building that the West German pharmaceutical company Hoechst AG was constructing for research using laboratory animals.
- The captors of J. Paul Getty III, who had been kidnapped on July 9, confirmed that the abduction was not a hoax and that they had Getty as their hostage, cutting off his ear and mailing it to the Rome newspaper Il Messaggero along with a ransom demand.
- A transit of Mercury took place for the first time since May 9, 1970, as the planet Mercury crossed in front of the Sun.
- Born:
  - Haroon Yousaf, Pakistani footballer and national team captain with 53 appearances for Pakistan in soccer football competition; in Mandi Bahauddin, Punjab province
  - Ganesh Hegde, Indian film choreographer; in Bombay (now Mumbai)
  - Dawn Shadforth, British music video director; in Billericay, Essex
- Died:
  - David "Stringbean" Akeman, 57, U.S. country musician was shot along with his wife dead by intruders at their home in Ridgetop, Tennessee near Nashville. Akeman had performed at the Grand Ole Opry in Nashville earlier in the evening and left around 10:30, apparently surprising burglars who had come to the house while Akeman was in concert.
  - Joe Petrali, 69, American motorcycle racing champion with 49 wins; holder of the world motorcycle speed record from 1937 to 1948
  - Rosemary Theby, 81, American film actress

== November 11, 1973 (Sunday) ==
- Egypt and Israel signed a United States-sponsored cease-fire accord brokered by Henry Kissinger.
- Died:
  - Artturi Ilmari Virtanen, 78, Finnish chemist and 1945 Nobel Prize laureate for his discoveries in food preservation
  - Hassan al-Hudaybi, 81, Egyptian terrorist and leader of the Muslim Brotherhood since 1951, died after 19 years under house arrest.
  - Harry Raymond Eastlack, 39, American sufferer of fibrodysplasia ossificans progressiva and the subject of medical research that led to most of the recorded knowledge of the disease

== November 12, 1973 (Monday) ==
- The UK television sitcom Last of the Summer Wine began its first regular series run on BBC One, following a pilot in Comedy Playhouse on January 4. Created by Roy Clarke, it would run for 37 years with 31 series and 294 episodes, concluding on August 29, 2010.
- British miners, led by National Union of Mineworkers president Joe Gormley, began an overtime ban partial strike, while ambulance drivers began selective strikes.
- Died: General Waclaw Stachiewicz, 78, chief of staff of the Polish Army from 1935 until the division of Poland between Nazi Germany and the Soviet Union in 1939, died in exile in Canada.

== November 13, 1973 (Tuesday) ==
- The U.S. and six other nations (the UK, West Germany, Italy, the Netherlands, Belgium and Switzerland) jointly decided to terminate an agreement to buy and sell gold only with each other, clearing the way for the U.S. to sell its dwindling, but still large stockpile, to private individuals. The seven nations had agreed on March 17, 1968, to halt sales of their gold stocks.
- The government of the United Kingdom proclaimed a state of emergency in light of the selective strikes of British coal miners.
- U.S. Senator Edward W. Brooke of Massachusetts talked to President Nixon personally during a meeting along with 14 other Republican senators, and said he thought that Nixon should resign in light of the Watergate scandal. Brooke said later of Nixon, "He took it very graciously. He said he understood it was made without malice. But he said it would be the easy way."
- Died:
  - Cardini (stage name for Richard V. Pitchford), 77, Welsh-born U.S. magician
  - Elsa Schiaparelli, 83, Italian-born French fashion designer.
  - Bruno Maderna, 53, Italian conductor and composer, died of lung cancer
  - B. S. Johnson, 40, English novelist and TV producer, committed suicide

== November 14, 1973 (Wednesday) ==
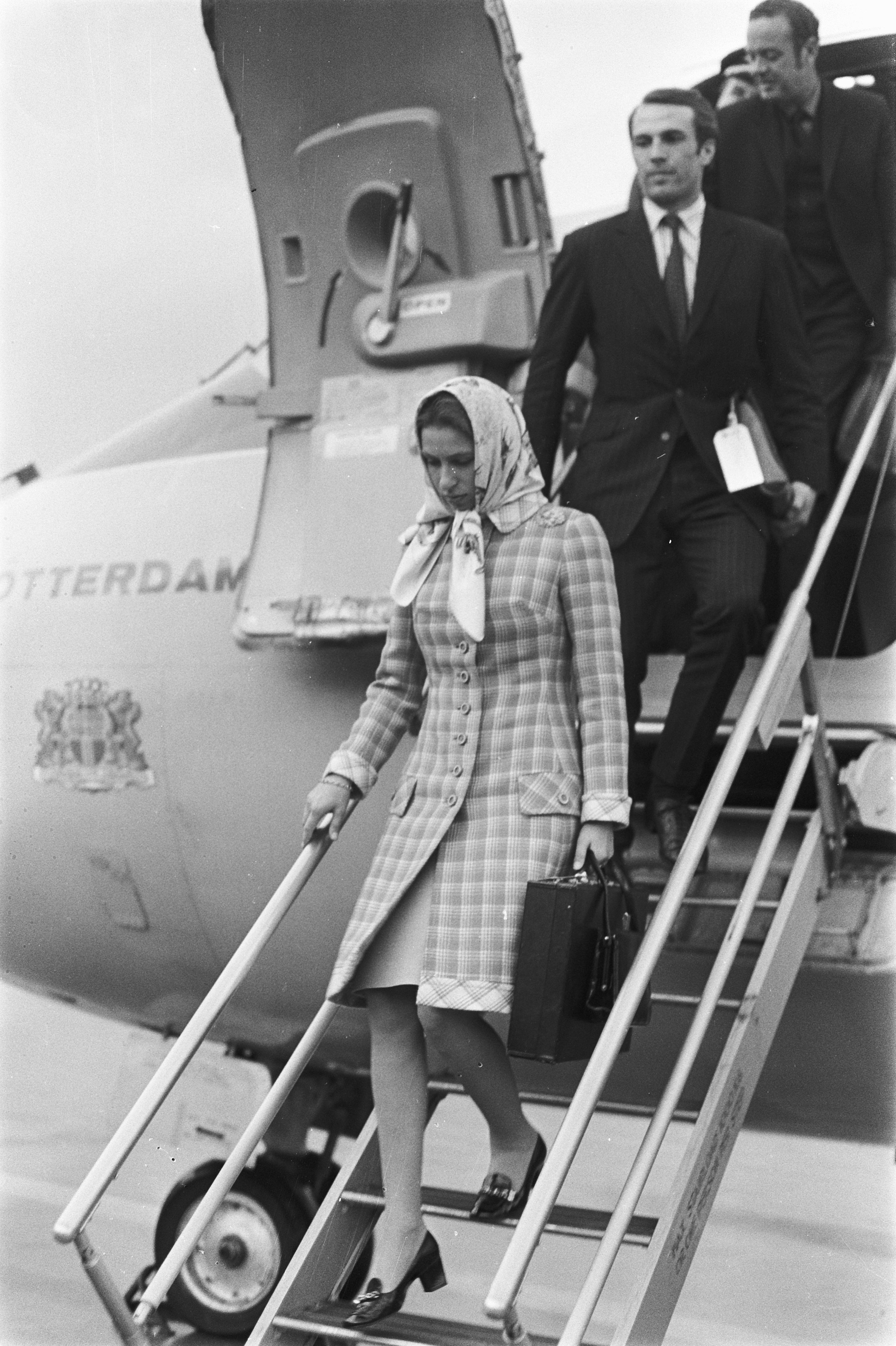
Princess Anne and Captain Phillips in 1973

- In the United Kingdom, Princess Anne, daughter of Queen Elizabeth, married Captain Mark Phillips in Westminster Abbey. They would divorce in 1992.
- Eight members of the Provisional IRA were convicted of bombings that had taken place in London during March 1973.

== November 15, 1973 (Thursday) ==
- The exchange of Israeli and Egyptian prisoners of war began the day after the announcement of an agreement between the two nations for repatriation of personnel captured during the Yom Kippur War. The International Red Cross flew a group of Egyptian POWs from Tel Aviv to Cairo on a DC-9, while an IRC DC-6 flew 26 wounded Israelis back home at the same time. The exchange was completed by November 22.
- An apartment building fire in the U.S. city of Los Angeles killed 24 residents and injured 52 others after starting on a sofa in the building's lobby and then spreading quickly through open stairwells in the wood-frame structure. Although firefighters arrived at the Stratford Apartments within five minutes after the alarm sounded, many of the casualties died from jumping from their windows.
- Six weeks before the speed limit in the United States would be dropped to 55 miles per hour (89 km/h), the U.S. state of Washington enacted a law lowering its speed limit to 50 miles per hour (80 km/h). The traffic fatality rate would drop by 11 percent for the rest of the year.

== November 16, 1973 (Friday) ==
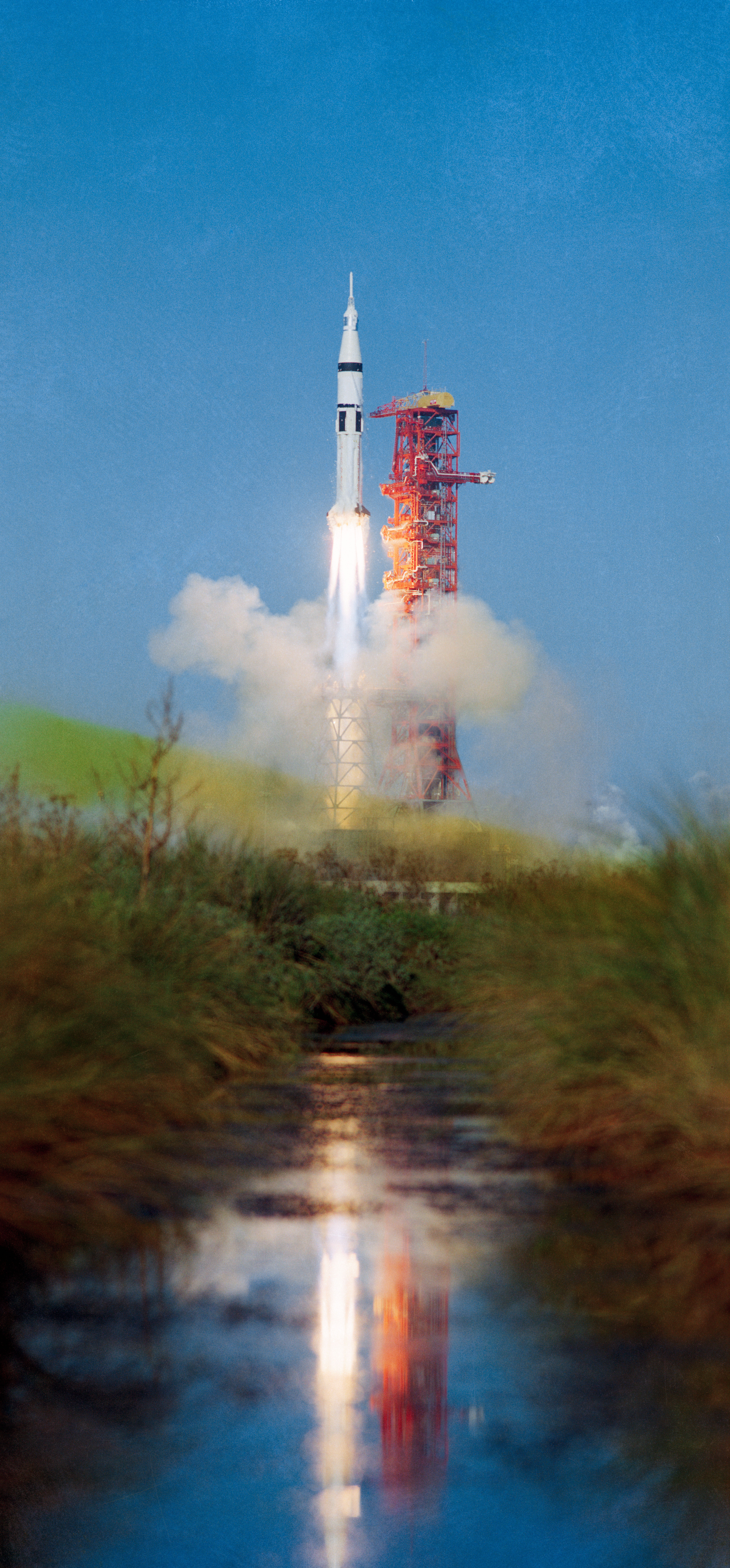
Skylab 4 launched from Cape Canaveral

- Skylab 4, the third crewed mission to NASA's Skylab space station, was launched from Kennedy Space Center at Cape Canaveral, Florida at 9:01 a.m. EST (1401 UTC). Commander Gerald Carr docked the command module to the space station eight hours after launch.
- U.S. President Richard Nixon signed the Trans-Alaska Pipeline Authorization Act into law, authorizing the construction of the Alaska Pipeline.
- Born:
  - Christian Horner, English racer and manager of the Red Bull Racing team; in Leamington Spa, Warwickshire, England
  - Brendan Laney, New Zealand-born Scottish rugby union player and sportscaster; in Invercargill, New Zealand
  - Marcus Lemonis, Lebanese-born American businessman, philanthropist and politician; in Beirut, Lebanon
  - Jude Monye, Nigerian Olympic track and field athlete and 2000 Olympic gold medalist; in Onicha-Ugbo, Delta State
- Died:
  - Amedeo Escobar, 85, Italian film score composer
  - Lorenzo Fernández, 73, Uruguayan footballer and national team player for the 1930 World Cup winners and the 1928 Olympic champions
  - Alfredo Ghierra, 82, Uruguayan footballer and national team player for the 1924 Olympic champions
  - Alan Watts, 58, English- born American philosopher, author and educator, died of a cardiac arrest

== November 17, 1973 (Saturday) ==
- At a press conference in Orlando, Florida, U.S. President Richard Nixon told 400 Associated Press managing editors, "People have got to know whether their President is a crook. Well, I'm not a crook. I've earned everything I've got." The statement came in response to a question from reporter Joseph Ungaro of The Providence Journal about a Journal report that he had only paid $792 in income taxes in 1970 and $878 in 1971.
- In London, the foreign ministers of France and the United Kingdom signed a treaty for the construction of the proposed tunnel underneath the English Channel.
- The Athens Polytechnic uprising, which had started on November 14 as a student protest against the military junta that ruled Greece, was brutally suppressed by the Greek Army, with the deaths of 40 protesters and the injury of at least 1,103.
- All 27 people on board an Air Vietnam passenger flight were killed when the Douglas C-47 crashed while flying from Saigon to Quang Ngai. The aircraft struck the nearly vertical wall of a mountain at an altitude of 1,200 feet (370 m) only while attempting a landing at an airport at Chu Lai.
- In Washington, D.C., the right leg of 12-year-old Edward M. Kennedy Jr. was amputated above the knee due to a bone tumor.
- Born:
  - Alexei Urmanov, Russian figure skater and 1994 Olympic gold medalist; in Leningrad (now Saint Petersburg), Russian SFSR, Soviet Union
  - Hamed Behdad, Iranian film actor; in Mashhad
- Died:
  - Louise Koster, 84, Luxembourg classical music composer
  - Rudolf Bredow, 68, German painter who received posthumous fame in the 1990s
  - The Mother (Mirra Alfassa), 95, French-Indian spiritual guru and mystic

== November 18, 1973 (Sunday) ==
- At a meeting in Vienna, the oil ministers and administrators of the Arab states said they would postpone their plans for a 5 percent reduction in oil shipments to eight of the nine Common Market nations.
- Died: Sir Gerald Nabarro, 60, controversial UK politician

== November 19, 1973 (Monday) ==
- The Rio de la Plata Treaty was signed between the foreign ministers of Argentina and Uruguay to settle their dispute over the boundary on the Rio de la Plata, the river that separates the two nations.
- The Laserium, the first regular laser show was launched by Ivan Dryer, who leased a laser from the California Institute of Technology for shows at the Griffith Observatory in Los Angeles, followed by a tour of 46 cities in North America.
- Born:
  - Nim Chimpsky, chimpanzee later used in an extended study of animal language acquisition at Columbia University (d. 2000)
  - Savion Glover, American tap dancer, actor, and choreographer.

== November 20, 1973 (Tuesday) ==
- A Charlie Brown Thanksgiving premiered on CBS.
- Scot Halpin, a 19-year-old drummer from Muscatine, Iowa, became part of the rock band The Who for one evening after coming from the audience to replace regular drummer Keith Moon, who had passed out from drugs and alcohol. The Who had been performing a concert near rock concert near Oakland, California. For one song, only Roger Daltrey, John Entwistle and Pete Townshend were available to play. Townshend asked the audience, "Can anybody play the drums?" and added, "I need somebody really good!". Halpin finished out the concert.
- Died: Allan Sherman (stage name for Allan G. Copelon), 48, American comedian known for his parodies of well-known songs, died of respiratory failure from emphysema.

== November 21, 1973 (Wednesday) ==
- U.S. President Richard Nixon's attorney, J. Fred Buzhardt, revealed that an 18½-minute gap existed in one of the White House tape recordings related to the Watergate scandal.
- In one of the stranger qualification games for soccer football's the FIFA World Cup, the Chilean national football team showed up, as scheduled, for the match in Santiago against the Soviet Union, which was boycotting because the game was being played in the Estadio Nacional, where political prisoners had been tortured and executed after the September 11 coup d'état. With 15,000 fans in the stands and the scoreboard activated, the Chilean team took the field and worked their way down to the empty goal in the next 30 seconds, and team captain Francisco Valdés kicked the ball into the net to make the victory official. FIFA referee Erich Linemayr then signaled a victory for Chile.
- In Argentina, the right-wing terrorist group Argentine Anticommunist Alliance (Alianza Anticomunista Argentina), which would go on to kill at least 1,122 people, committed its first known act, an unsuccessful attempt to murder Argentine Senator es:Hipólito Solari Yrigoyen with a car bomb. Solari was injured, but survived the attack.

== November 22, 1973 (Thursday) ==
- Under the threat of an oil embargo from the Arab oil producing nations, Japan's government agreed to drop its support for Israel and joined the United Nations in advocating for a separate nation for Palestinian people in Israel. The decision of Prime Minister Kakuei Tanaka, announced by government spokesman Susumu Nikaido, has been called "Perhaps the most important policy decision ever made on the Middle East in the twentieth century."
- Saudi Arabia warned the United States that if the U.S. did not stop supporting Israel, the Saudis were prepared to reduce oil production by 80 percent, and added that if the U.S. attempted to use force, Saudi Arabia would destroy its oil wells.
- Born:
  - Marjolein Kriek, Dutch clinical geneticist, and the first woman to have her total DNA genome sequenced; in Leiden.
  - Giorgi Targamadze, opposition leader of the Parliament of Georgia as president of the Christian-Democratic Movement (KDM); in Tbilisi, Georgian SSR, Soviet Union
- Died: John Dedman, 77, Australian politician

== November 23, 1973 (Friday) ==
- The sinking of the Cyprus cargo ship Annette killed 21 of the 24 crew after the ship struck a harbor wall at Ashdod in Israel.
- All four crew of an Italian Air Force airplane were killed when an improvised explosive device detonated aboard Argo 16, a C-47 Dakota used by the Servizio Informazioni Difesa (Defense Information Service) for electronic surveillance of Yugoslavia. The aircraft crashed in Italy near Marghera.
- The last game of the Atlantic Coast Football League, a minor pro football league founded in 1962, was played. In the championship, the New England Colonials defeated the Bridgeport (CT) Jets, 41 to 17, in Bridgeport, Connecticut. The league permanently ceased operations at the end of the season.
- Died:
  - Sessue Hayakawa, 87, Japanese film star best known for 1957's The Bridge on the River Kwai
  - Adele Buffington (pen name for Adele Burgdorfer), 73, American film screenwriter
  - Jennie Tourel (stage name for Eizhenija Davidovich), 73, Russian-born American opera singer
  - Paul Newland, 70, U.S. character actor in film and TV

== November 24, 1973 (Saturday) ==
- The championship of Canadian college football was decided with the playing of the ninth annual game for the Vanier Cup. The Huskies of Saint Mary's University defeated the Redmen of McGill University, 14 to 6, before 17,000 people at Toronto.
- Xavier University played its last college football game, defeating the University of Toledo, 35 to 31, to finish with a record of 5-5-1 as an NCAA Division I team. Less than a month later, the private university's board of trustees voted to permanently discontinue the Xavier Musketeers football program. As of 50 years later, there are no plans to revive XU football. (December 20, 1973).
- Born:
  - Suzan Najm Aldeen, Syrian-born film TV actress; in Duraykish
  - Carolina Sandoval, Venezuelan-born U.S. TV anchor; in Caracas
  - Alejandro Ávila (stage name for Alejandro Aranda Ávila), Mexican TV actor; in Guadalajara
- Died:
  - General H. L. Glyn Hughes, 81, South African-born British Army General notable for taking care of the victims of the Bergen-Belsen concentration camp
  - Nikolai Kamov (engineer), 71, Soviet Russian aerospace engineer

== November 25, 1973 (Sunday) ==
- George Papadopoulos, the President of Greece since declaring a republic in May, and its de facto leader since 1967, was ousted in a military coup led by Brigadier General Dimitrios Ioannidis. Lieutenant General Phaedon Gizikis was sworn in as the new president.
- Three young members of the Arab Nationalist Youth Organization hijacked KLM Flight 861 with 264 people on board, over Iraq. The Boeing 747 plane flew first to Malta, where the hijackers released eight female flight attendants and most of the passengers, then proceeded with 11 hostages to Dubai, where the hijacking of the largest number of airline passengers in history ended without further incident.
- A ban against Sunday driving went into effect in West Germany, three weeks after the Netherlands became the first nation to do so. West Germany joined the Netherlands, Belgium, Luxembourg, Switzerland and Denmark in the motorless Sundays, and Italy would follow suit on December 2.
- The Ottawa Rough Riders defeated the Edmonton Eskimos, 22 to 18, to win the Grey Cup and the championship of the Canadian Football League.
- Ned Rorem's opera Bertha, a parody of Shakespeare's plays, premiered in New York City with mezzo-soprano Beverly Wolff in the title role.
- Died:
  - Albert DeSalvo, 42, American rapist who confessed to being the "Boston Strangler" who killed 13 women from 1962 to 1964, was stabbed to death by another inmate at the Walpole Prison in Massachusetts.
  - Harry Driver, 42, British TV producer and comedian known for Love Thy Neighbour and For the Love of Ada, died of influenza and complications of polio.
  - Laurence Harvey, 45, English actor, died of stomach cancer.
  - Paulette Bernège, 77, French domestic engineer known for her concepts of efficient home design

== November 26, 1973 (Monday) ==
- Representatives of the nations of Indonesia and Malaysia signed a memorandum of understanding agreeing to pay jointly for an independent survey and demarcation of their boundaries on the island of Borneo.
- In testimony before a U.S. District Judge John J. Sirica, U.S. President Nixon's personal secretary, Rose Mary Woods, took the blame for an 18-minute gap on a tape recording that would have been important evidence in the investigation of the Watergate scandal. The recording was of conversation between President Nixon and Chief of Staff H. R. Haldeman on June 20, 1972, three days after the Watergate burglary. Mrs. Woods said that the erasure had been an accident.
- Born: Peter Facinelli, American actor; in Queens, New York
- Died: Charles E. Whittaker, 72, former U.S. Supreme Court justice, 1957-1962.

== November 27, 1973 (Tuesday) ==
- Aruna Shanbaug, a 25-year-old nurse in India, went into a coma that would last more than 41 years until her death in 2015. Shanbaug was sexually assaulted and strangled while working at the King Edward Memorial Hospital in Bombay, but survived and remained in a vegetative state until dying, at the age of 66, on May 18, 2015.
- The Emergency Petroleum Allocation Act was signed into law by U.S. President Nixon, 25 days after it had been introduced as a bill.
- The United States Senate voted, 92–3, to confirm Gerald Ford as the 40th Vice President of the United States. The three Democrat senators voting against Ford, the House Republican leader, were Thomas F. Eagleton of Missouri, William D. Hathaway of Maine, and Gaylord Nelson of Wisconsin.
- The U.S. House of Representatives voted, 311 to 88, to place the U.S. on daylight saving time year round in order to reduce electricity and heating demands by three percent. With a law that would stop the setting back of clocks by one hour for six months of the year, the measure would, if passed into law, would take effect no earlier than October, 1974.
- Born:
  - Twista (stage name for Carl Terrell Mitchell), American rap artist known for his fast (598 syllables per minute) enunciation skills; in Chicago
  - Vladimir Zelenko, Ukrainian-born American physician known for promoting hydroxychloroquine as part of his three-drug "Zelenko Protocol" that he claimed to successfully treat the COVID-19 virus; in Kiev, Ukrainian SSR, Soviet Union

== November 28, 1973 (Wednesday) ==
- The "Battle of Versailles", a fashion show to raise funds for the restoration of the Palace of Versailles, was held and featured the five leading fashion designers of France— Yves Saint Laurent, Pierre Cardin, Emanuel Ungaro, Marc Bohan, and Hubert de Givenchy — against five of the most prominent in the United States— Anne Klein, Stephen Burrows, Bill Blass, Halston, and Oscar de la Renta. Attracting 700 prominent guests, the show was a landmark presentation that "gave American fashion legitimacy" and confirmed "the newly attained dominance of American sportswear."
- The U.S. Environmental Protection Agency published a report confirming that lead from motor vehicle exhaust posed a direct threat to the health of children. The study would lead to regulations phasing out the amount of lead in fuel, in favor of unleaded gasoline, as well the mass introduction of the catalytic converter in vehicles starting in the 1975 model year.
- The first deliberate ramming of one jet plane into another jet in combat took place as Soviet Air Force Captain Gennadii N. Eliseev failed to bring down an Iranian Imperial Air Force surveillance aircraft with air-to-air missiles or gunfire, and rammed his MiG-21 into the F-4 Phantom II. The crew of the F-4, an Iranian Major and a U.S. Air Force Colonel, ejected safely in Soviet airspace and were captured, while Eliseev died when his airplane exploded.
- Died: Marthe Bibesco, 87, Romanian-French writer of the Belle Époque

== November 29, 1973 (Thursday) ==
- In Japan, 104 people were killed in the Taiyo department store fire in Kumamoto, in Kyūshū prefecture. Ironically, the store's sprinkler system wasn't working because it was "under repair for fire prevention week."
- The world's highest flying bird was proven to be the Ruppell's griffon (Gyps rueppellii), a vulture indigenous to central Africa. One of the species happened to be flying at an altitude of more than seven miles when it was sucked into a jet engine flying over Côte d'Ivoire. The plane's altimeter was at 37,900 feet (11,600 m) when the encounter occurred, forcing an emergency landing.
- Born: Ryan Giggs, Welsh footballer and coach, in Cardiff

== November 30, 1973 (Friday) ==
- The United Nations General Assembly voted, 91 to 4 (with 26 abstentions) to approve the UN's Apartheid Convention, officially the "1973 United Nations International Convention on the Suppression and Punishment of the Crime of Apartheid".
- The government of Bangladesh issued a pardon for approximately 26,000 of the 37,000 people who had been in prison for collaboration with the enemy during the 1971 Bangladesh Liberation War. The amnesty did not apply to collaborators who had been charged with crimes of violence.
- Zaire's President Mobutu Sese Seko announced in a speech to the central African nation's parliament that his government would seize and redistribute all foreign-owned businesses. Smith, Hampton; Merrill, Tim; Sandra W., Meditz (1994).
