= Professional Golfers' Association of America =

American organization of golf professionals

PGA of America
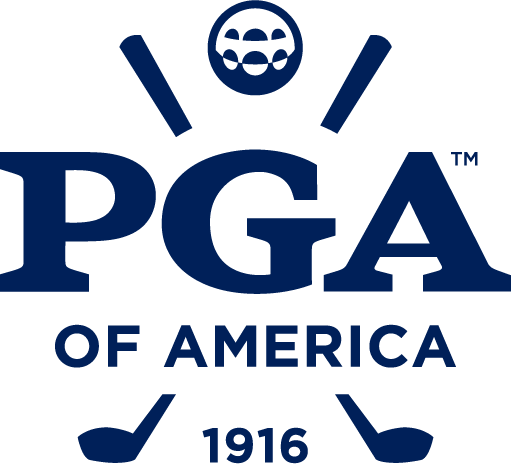
- Sport: Golf
- Founded: April 10, 1916; 110 years ago
- Founder: Rodman Wanamaker
- First season: 1916
- CEO: Terry Clark
- President: Nathan Charnes (acting)
- Motto: "Serving the Members and Growing the Game"
- Country: United States
- Headquarters: Frisco, Texas
- Website: www.pga.com

The Professional Golfers' Association of America (PGA of America) is an American organization of golf professionals that was founded in 1916. Consisting of over 30,000 members, the PGA of America's undertaking is to establish and elevate the standards of the profession and to grow interest and participation in the game of golf.

In 1968, the PGA Tour was spun off from the PGA of America as a separate organization to administer professional golf tours. However, the PGA of America still directly conducts several tournaments, including the PGA Championship, the Senior PGA Championship, and the Women's PGA Championship.

On December 4, 2018, the PGA of America announced plans to relocate its headquarters from Palm Beach Gardens, Florida, to a planned 660-acre mixed-use development in Frisco, Texas. PGA Frisco is a public and private partnership between the PGA of America, Omni Hotels & Resorts, the City of Frisco and the Frisco Independent School District. The 660-acre campus was inaugurated in August 2022 and it includes the headquarters of PGA America, Northern Texas PGA, Fields Ranch (two world-class 18-hole championship golf courses and a state-of-the-art clubhouse), Omni PGA Frisco Resort & Spa, and the PGA District (retail and entertainment district).

== History ==
The Professional Golfers' Association of America was established on April 10, 1916, but the genesis of the first all-professional golf body in the United States was sparked by a luncheon on January 17, 1916, hosted by Rodman Wanamaker at Wanamaker's Store on Ninth Street and Broadway in New York City. Sixty attendees were invited by the Taplow Club, which was a business group within Wanamaker's Store and led by professional Tom McNamara of Brookline, Massachusetts, an outstanding player and talented salesman who was keenly aware of the welfare of the club professional. McNamara pressed upon Wanamaker that it was prime time to bring U.S. professionals together, and that the publicity generated would be advantageous. Locked into a retail battle with rival A.G. Spalding & Bros. for the sale of golf balls, Wanamaker enthusiastically approved the initiative. He asked McNamara to arrange the luncheon inviting prominent amateur and professional golf leaders from throughout the country.

Wanamaker's ninth floor restaurant was chosen as the site for the Monday luncheon, which attracted amateur great Francis Ouimet; noted writer, player and budding architect A.W. Tillinghast; and P.C. Pulver, the New York Evening Sun reporter and one of the first newspaper golf "beat" writers who later served as the first editor of The Professional Golfer, today's PGA Magazine. The guest list also included some of America's top professionals: Alex Smith, James Maiden, Robert White, Jack Mackie and Alex Pirie, as well as others who derived their livelihoods from their jobs at private and public golf facilities.

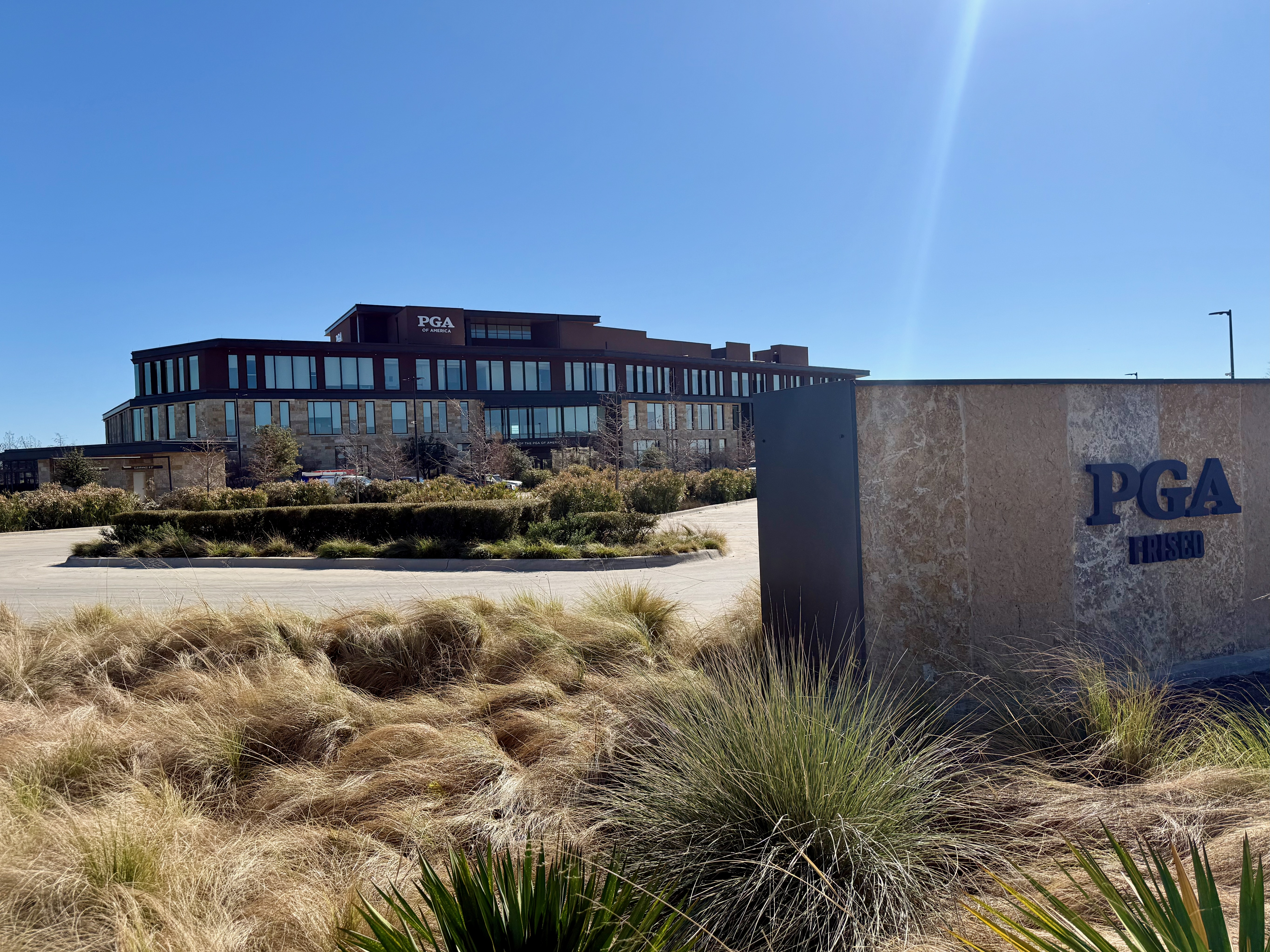
Exterior view of the PGA of America headquarters in Frisco, Texas

The Taplow Club was not an eatery or dining establishment. Instead, it was Wanamaker's nickname for his in-store business group. He had taken the name from a palatial estate he leased on Taplow Court some 25 miles outside London. He would later stamp "Taplow" on his store's lower-end, private-label golf balls. Wanamaker, who was not a golfer, was never reported to have attended the luncheon. He delegated the details to McNamara. With golf becoming more and more popular in the U.S., McNamara believed that his fellow professionals could benefit by working together. Wanamaker also believed consolidating professionals would also improve their social standing, having long been treated by club members as second-class citizens.

Toastmaster Joseph H. Appel, vice president of Wanamaker's foundation, presented Wanamaker's offer to conduct a match play championship for professionals, similar to Great Britain's News of the World Tournament. Appel also broached the subject of a national association of professionals.

In addition, Wanamaker would donate a cup and $2,580 in prize money, and would ultimately pay the travel expenses of the competitors. That "cup" became the Rodman Wanamaker Trophy, and the tournament the PGA Championship. The inaugural PGA Championship was held October 10–14, 1916, at Siwanoy Country Club in Bronxville, New York, and won by English-born Jim Barnes.

Former British PGA Secretary James Hepburn suggested that the 32 lowest finishers in the U.S. Open would be paired for match play, following Robert White's contention that the U.S. was too large for section qualifiers. The all-professional match play concept was in direct contrast to the United States Golf Association's medal (stroke) play format. Wanamaker requested that the proposal for the Championship be contingent upon approval by the USGA or other governing bodies.

Tillinghast spoke up and declared that the professionals should be independent of the USGA in handling their own affairs and competitions. Tillinghast's argument held, as a follow-up organizational meeting was planned the following day in Wanamaker's store.

Organizers then formed a seven-person group whose primary task was to define tentative bylaws for the new association. They named Hepburn to chair an organizational committee of professionals that included Maiden, White and Mackie, as well as Gilbert Nicholls, John "Jack" Hobens, and Herbert Strong—none of the group was American-born. This group drafted a constitution, turning to the British PGA for assistance.

The luncheon agenda addressed giving golf professionals say when it came to the organization and staging of tournaments, among other employment issues.

The response to creating such a body was positive, and additional meetings followed. On April 10, 1916, in the second-floor boardroom of the Hotel Martinique on 32nd and Broadway, the Professional Golfers' Association of America was born. There were 78 members elected that day, including 35 PGA Charter Members, of which 28 were born outside the U.S.

The Association began with seven PGA Sections: Metropolitan, Middle States, New England, Southeastern, Central, Northwestern and Pacific. Today, there are 41 PGA Sections nationwide.

From 1934 through November 1961, the PGA of America maintained a "Caucasian-only" membership clause in its bylaws. The clause was removed by amending its constitution. The previous year, it had voted to retain the clause, and had gained the ire of California Attorney General Stanley Mosk, who threatened to shut down the PGA in the state until the clause was removed. The 1962 PGA Championship was scheduled for Brentwood Country Club in Los Angeles, but the PGA moved it to Philadelphia at Aronimink.

With an increase of revenue in the late 1960s due to expanded television coverage, a dispute arose between the touring professionals and the PGA of America on how to distribute the windfall. The tour players wanted larger purses, where the PGA desired the money to go to the general fund to help grow the game at the local level. Following the final major in July 1968 at the PGA Championship, several leading tour pros voiced their dissatisfaction with the venue and the abundance of club pros in the field. The increased friction resulted in a new entity in August, what would eventually become the PGA Tour. Tournament players formed their own organization, American Professional Golfers, Inc. (APG), independent of the PGA of America. After several months, a compromise was reached in December: the tour players agreed to abolish the APG and form the PGA "Tournament Players Division", a fully autonomous division under the supervision of a new 10-member Tournament Policy Board. The board consisted of four tour players, three PGA of America executives, and three outside members, initially business executives. It hired its own commissioner and was renamed the "PGA Tour" in the mid-1970s.

Women were not allowed to be members of the PGA until 1977.

In October 2014, PGA President Ted Bishop responded to Ian Poulter's criticism of the Ryder Cup captaincy of Nick Faldo and Tom Watson by calling Poulter a "lil' girl", which led to Bishop's firing. The PGA called Bishop's statements "unacceptable" and "insensitive gender-based". In 2026, Don Rea Jr. was removed by the board of directors 18 months into his 24-month term as president after having previously downplayed vulgar fan behavior toward the European team at the 2025 Ryder Cup.

== Championships ==
The PGA conducts annual men's, senior, and women's major championships: the PGA Championship, the Senior PGA Championship, and the Women's PGA Championship (which was renamed from the LPGA Championship in 2015 after a partnership between the LPGA and the PGA of America to heighten the event's profile). All three tournaments feature professional golfers, but their fields also contain slots reserved for club professionals.

The PGA conducts approximately 40 tournaments per year for its members and apprentices, including the PGA Professional Championship and the Assistant PGA Professional Championship. It also co-organizes the biennial Ryder Cup, PGA Cup and in 2019, the inaugural Women's PGA Cup.

== Growth of the game ==
In 2003, the PGA of America created the Player Development department within the Association in an endeavor to reach out to new, past and sporadic adult golfers. This is accomplished through the growth, promotion and support of instructional programs and events at PGA Member facilities that support adults and families to play golf. Included in these programs is Play Golf America, instigated in 2004 with the help of the Allied Associations (LPGA, National Golf Course Owners Association, PGA Tour, USGA, and others involved in the annual Golf 20/20 Conference).

== Organization ==
The PGA is organized into 14 districts and 41 sections.

District 1

- Northeast New York
- Connecticut
- New England

District 2

- Metropolitan
- New Jersey
- Philadelphia

District 3

- Alabama-Northwest Florida
- Gulf States
- Tennessee

District 4

- Central New York
- Tri-State
- Western New York

District 5

- Michigan
- Northern Ohio
- Southern Ohio

District 6

- Illinois
- Indiana
- Wisconsin

District 7

- Gateway
- Midwest
- South Central

District 8

- Iowa
- Minnesota
- Nebraska

District 9

- Colorado
- Rocky Mountain
- Utah

District 10

- Carolinas
- Kentucky
- Mid-Atlantic

District 11

- Aloha
- Northern California
- Southern California

District 12

- Northern Texas
- Southern Texas
- Sun Country

District 13

- Georgia
- Northern Florida
- Southern Florida

District 14

- Pacific Northwest
- Southwest

=== PGA professionals ===
To be elected to membership of the PGA, aspirant golf professionals (apprentices) and students go through three levels of education courses, written exams, simulation testing, seminars, and must pass the PGA Playing Ability Test (PAT). These men and women have the option to pursue the PGA education through self-study, by the use of accredited PGA Golf Management Universities (currently 18 universities in the United States offer a PGA Golf Management program), or through an accelerated PGA Golf Management Program.

=== PGA Reach ===
PGA Reach is the charitable foundation of the PGA of America. The mission of PGA Reach is to positively impact the lives of youth, military, and diverse populations by enabling access to PGA professionals, PGA Sections and the game of golf.

=== PGA presidents ===
Name	PGA Section	Years
Robert White	Metropolitan	1916–19
Jack Mackie	Metropolitan	1919–20
George Sargent	Southeastern	1921–26
Alex Pirie	Metropolitan	1927–30
Charles Hall	Southeastern	1931–32
George Jacobus	New Jersey	1933–39
Tom Walsh	Illinois	1940–41
Ed Dudley	Philadelphia	1942–48
Joe Novak	Southern California	1949–51
Horton Smith	Michigan	1952–54
Harry Moffitt	Northern Ohio	1955–57
Harold Sargent	Southeastern	1958–60
Lou Strong	Illinois	1961–63
Warren Cantrell	Texas	1964–65
Max Elbin	Middle Atlantic	1966–68
Leo Fraser	Philadelphia	1969–70
Warren Orlick	Michigan	1971–72
William Clarke	Middle Atlantic	1973–74
Henry Poe	Dixie	1975–76
Don Padgett	Indiana	1977–78
Frank Cardi	Metropolitan	1979–80
Joe Black	Northern Texas	1981–82
Mark Kizziar	South Central	1983–84
Mickey Powell	Indiana	1985–86
James Ray Carpenter	Gulf States	1987–88
Patrick J. Reilly	Southern California	1989–90
Dick Smith	Philadelphia	1991–92
Gary Schaal	Carolinas	1993–94
Tom Addis III	Southern California	1995–96
Ken Lindsay	Gulf States	1997–98
Will Mann	Carolinas	1999–2000
Jack Connelly	Philadelphia	2001–02
M. G. Orender	North Florida	2003–04
Roger Warren	Carolinas	2005–06
Brian Whitcomb	Southwest	2007–08
Jim Remy	New England	2009–10
Allen Wronowski	Middle Atlantic	2011–12
Ted Bishop	Indiana	2013–14
Derek Sprague	Northeastern New York	2015–16
Paul K. Levy	Southern California	2017–18
Suzy Whaley	South Florida	2019–20
Jim Richerson	Southern California	2021–22
John Lindert	Michigan	2023–24
Don Rea Jr.		2024–26

Presidents by PGA Section
PGA Section	Presidents
Southern California	5
Metropolitan	4
Philadelphia	4
Carolinas	3
Indiana	3
Michigan	3
Middle Atlantic	3
Southeastern*	3
Gulf States	2
Illinois	2
Dixie**	1
New England	1
New Jersey	1
North Florida	1
Northeastern New York	1
Northern Ohio	1
Northern Texas	1
South Central	1
South Florida	1
Southwest	1
Texas*	1

- Asterisk (*) indicates defunct PGA section
- Dixie (**) now the Alabama-Northwest Florida PGA Section

== PGA properties ==
=== Current ===
- PGA Golf Club (Port St. Lucie, Florida) – 54 holes of public-access resort golf designed by Tom Fazio and Pete Dye in PGA Village, which is ranked among the "75 Best Golf Resorts in North America" by Golf Digest (No. 51).
- PGA Center for Golf Learning and Performance (Port St. Lucie, Florida) – 35-acre (14 ha) golf park featuring a lighted driving range, short game practice area, and a three-hole teaching course. Ranked among the Top 100 Golf Ranges in America from 1999 to 2011 by Golf Range Magazine. Sold in 2018.
- PGA Gallery – located in the halls of the PGA Golf Club clubhouse in Port St. Lucie, Florida. The PGA Gallery showcases the major trophies in golf, and artifacts of PGA Champions and many rare pieces of PGA history to connect visitors to the rich history of the game and the Association.
- PGA Education Center (Port St. Lucie, Florida) – provides education programs to serve both PGA members and apprentices.

=== Former ===
- Valhalla Golf Club (Louisville, Kentucky) – designed by Jack Nicklaus. Site of the 2008 Ryder Cup; 2004 and 2011 Senior PGA Championships; 2002 PGA Professional National Championship; and 1996, 2000, 2014 and 2024 PGA Championships. Ranked No. 95 among "America's 100 Greatest Golf Courses" by Golf Digest. The PGA of America initially bought a 25% interest in 1993, increased it to 50% shortly after the 1996 PGA Championship, and took complete ownership shortly after the 2000 PGA Championship. It sold the club in 2022 to a group of local investors and club members.

== See also ==
- Dewey Brown
- Golf in the United States
- LPGA
