= Yuri Raevsky =

Soviet serial killer and rapist

- Born: Yuri Nikolayevich Raevsky; 1952; Penza, Penza Oblast, RSFSR
- Died: 8 December 1973 (aged 20–21); Moscow, RSFSR
- Cause of death: Execution by shooting
- Other names: "The Vnukovo Maniac" "The Child of Vice"
- Conviction: Murder
- Penalty: Death

Details
- Victims: 6
- Span of crimes: August – October 1971
- Country: Soviet Union
- States: Moscow, Klaipeda, Stavropol, Kharkiv
- Date apprehended: October 1971

Yuri Nikolayevich Raevsky (Russian: Ю́рий Никола́евич Рае́вский; 1952 – 8 December 1973), known as The Vnukovo Maniac (Russian: Внуковский маньяк), was a Soviet rapist and serial killer.

== Biography ==
Yuri Raevsky was born in 1952 in Penza to a prosperous family. At his vocational school, he was part of a Komsomol group.

It became a shock for everyone when the 16-year-old Raevsky attacked his neighbour and raped her (according to other sources, he tried to rape her). In 1970, he was imprisoned after a court trial. To serve his sentence, he was transferred to the Mordovian ASSR, in a corrective labour colony 30 kilometres away from Saransk. There he was abused by the homosexual inmates, with a tattoo even being applied to the "lowers" on the back - a blue rose. It has been suggested that from that moment on he began to dislike women. In June 1971, he escaped from prison.

Raevsky was able to attract women, including those older than him. He was able to convince future victims to accompany him to dubious places.

On the day of his escape, Raevsky met a woman on the outskirts of Saransk, whom he raped and tried to kill, first strangling, then beating her on the head with a piece of asphalt. The victim survived but remained disabled for the rest of her life.

Later it turned out that before the first arrest and trial, Raevsky hid his real passport and declared that he had lost it. After the trial, in order to impede the legalization in case of escape, the recovered passport was confiscated from him. But after escaping, the criminal took an old passport from a cache and was able to move around the country.

On 11 August 1971, while in Moscow, Raevsky raped, killed and robbed a young woman, followed by two other women (on 27 August and 14 September) with the same modus operandi. In each case, he throttled his victims, and then stabbed them several times with a knife). Later examinations found that the second victim was pregnant. The first 2 murders were committed in a forest belt near Vnukovo Airport, and the third was at a construction site near the Dinamo metro station. Raevsky chose tourists as his victims. Upon meeting them, he would give them a blue rose (the blue colour was obtained when the rose was put in water tinted with ink), which was left next to the deceased's bodies.

During the investigation of the first murder, authorities found a witness who testified that he saw the victim in the Vnukovo Airport building meeting with a man. It was later discovered that the latter was the fiancé of the woman, and that she had had a quarrel with him. The fiancé fell under suspicion and was arrested, but during this time the second murder occurred.

After the second murder, the investigation was taken under special control by the Procurator General of the Soviet Union, who established that the perpetrator did not leave any fingerprints or semen at the crime scene. At the second and third murder sites, the killer had torn the passports of his victims in order to further complicate their identification. The actions of the offender made the police assume that he had been previously convicted of a crime. The suggestion was confirmed when they found a witness who saw a tall guy on a construction site near Dinamo metro station with a dark spot on his lower back (the witness had noticed a tattoo when Raevsky was wearing a T-shirt). The tattoo on the lower back brought the investigators to the idea that the killer was abused during detention. Verification of criminal records, including reports of escapes from prisons, made it possible to identify Raevsky.

On 24 September 1971, Raevsky planned to commit a new crime. He lured a girl into the forest park zone in Gagarinsky District, but they were met by a local police officer, who was suspicious of a blue rose the girl had in her hand. Noticing that the policeman was heading towards him, Raevsky ran away. His would-be victim identified her companion in the photographs presented to her. After the encounter with the policeman, Raevsky left Moscow. From that time, he decided to change his residence after each murder he committed and stopped using the blue rose when meeting his victims.

In October, two weeks after leaving Moscow, Raevsky raped and killed a female tourist in Klaipėda, inflicting her with 14 stab wounds from a knife. The girl was with a group brought to an archaeological site in Klaipėda Castle. While leaving the crime scene, Raevsky dropped his passport, which some schoolchildren noticed. They picked it up and returned it to him, but not before they read his name, after which they reported the suspicious man to the police.

Soon after, Raevsky raped and killed a woman who had come to Mineralnye Vody. This crime became known only after his capture.

Towards the end of October in Kharkiv, Raevsky raped, killed and robbed another woman, a local of the city. The next day, while trying to sell the Polish demi-season coat of his victim, he was arrested. It is noteworthy that at the time of detention, Raevsky was only suspected of speculation, with the female militiaman who wrote the protocol on the administrative offence writing him a pass to leave. But while in the department, suspicions were aroused because the identity of the detainee could not be quickly established, as he did not have a passport with him, claiming that he had arrived from the Kursk Oblast. However, information about the residence and workplace of the detainee couldn't be verified. Soon, after paying attention to orientation, in which the murder of a woman associated with rape was mentioned, and the stealing of a Polish demi-season overcoat.

The investigation lasted about a year. The forensic psychiatric examination, conducted in 1972 in the Serbsky Center, recognized Raevsky as sane, but could not explain the reason for his cruelty.

In the summer of 1973 (according to other sources, it was on 26 February 1973) Yuri Raevsky was sentenced to death. The killer filed for a pardon from the Supreme Soviet of the Soviet Union, which was rejected. On 8 December 1973, he was executed by firing squad.

=== In the media ===
- "Blue Rose" - a film from the series "The investigation led...".
- "Child of Vice" - a film from the series "Legends of Soviet Investigation".

== See also ==
- List of Russian serial killers

== Literature ==
- A. I. Rakitin. Socialism does not breed crime. — Yekaterinburg: Cabinet Scientist, 2016. - 530 p.
