= Women's PGA Cup =

The Women's PGA Cup is a biennial women's golf competition which features golf professionals from Australia, Canada, Great Britain & Ireland, South Africa, Sweden and the United States. The winning team is presented with the Women's PGA Cup. The inaugural Women's PGA Cup was played in 2019 and was followed by a second event in 2022. A PGA Cup for men has been contested since 1973 and was an annual event until 1984, after which it became biennial.

== History ==
The Inaugural Women's PGA Cup was held from October 24–26, 2019, at Omni Barton Creek Resort & Spa in Austin, Texas with five teams. The competition was won by the United States by four strokes with a final score of 671, holding off team Canada (675), which on the final day twice trimmed the U.S. lead from 10 strokes to four. Great Britain & Ireland (698) finished third, followed by Australia (715) and Sweden (725). Brittany Kelly was the anchor for the U.S., finishing the three days at 2-over-par 218. Canada was led by Christine Wong (222). On the final day, Kelly (74), Alison Curdt (74) and Ashley Grier (75) were the three scorers counting in the final tabulations. Other U.S. team members were Joanna Coe and Seul-Ki Park.

The second Women's PGA Cup was held from October 27–29, 2022, at Twin Warriors Golf Club in Santa Ana Pueblo, New Mexico. Six teams took part, South Africa competing for the first time.

== Format ==
This international event features teams of five players. The three-day competition is played over 54 holes as a stroke play style event with each team's lowest three scores counted after each round. The winning team is decided based in the lowest 54-hole aggregate total.

== Results ==
Year	Winner	Score	Margin of victory	Runner-up	Venue
2022	USA	656	2 strokes	Canada	Twin Warriors Golf Club, New Mexico, US
2019	USA	671	4 strokes	Canada	Barton Creek Resort, Texas, US
