= Dewey Brown =

Professional golfer (1899–1973)

Dewey Brown Sr. (October 24, 1899 — December 22, 1973) was the first known African-American member of the Professional Golfers' Association of America (PGA), and the Golf Course Superintendents Association of America (GCSAA).

Brown became a member of the PGA in 1928, and the GCSAA in 1957, after having worked as a caddie in New Jersey. He was a renowned golf club maker and golf teacher during the 1920s and 1930s, and he crafted a set of golf clubs for President Warren G. Harding. In addition to Harding, Brown also crafted clubs for notable persons such as Vice President Charles Davis and Chick Evans. In 1934, he worked as an assistant golf pro at Shawnee in Pennsylvania. It is speculated that the PGA terminated Brown's membership when they discovered that he was African American. They previously believed he was white because of his light skin color but coincidentally at the time of his dismissal the PGA had recently implemented a Caucasian-only clause in its bylaws.

Brown purchased Cedar River Golf Club in Indian Lake, New York, in 1947. His son took it over after Brown retired in 1972.

== Early life ==
Brown was born on October 24, 1899, in North Carolina, before later moving to New Jersey as a young boy. It was at the age of eight when he was first introduced golf as he began caddying at the Madison Golf Course. He also worked as a groundskeeper on the facility. His passion for golf continued to grow, and under the tutelage of pro Tom Hucknell he displayed skill in club making. Brown worked for several years at Shawnee-on-the-Delaware as an assistant to the club professionals in addition to maintaining positions at Baltusrol Golf Club and the Hollywood Golf Club, both in New Jersey. Through his continual involvement in and interest in the golfing business, his skill in the sport itself began to cultivate and began to rival his adeptness at club crafting. So much so that many prominent individuals such as President Warren G. Harding purchased sets of his handmade clubs. With his aptitude in both teaching and playing Brown participated professionally in number of local tournaments.

== Professional career ==
In 1928, Brown became the first known African American member of the Professional Golfer's Association. Possessing very light skin, question of his racial identity did not arise. Unbeknownst to many at the time, he had in fact broken through the glass-ceiling of the golfing profession. Then in 1934 without reason or any forewarning his eligibility was revoked. Due to Brown's inexplicable termination, it is speculated that discovery of his black ancestry was the reason for his dismissal from the association. His light skin may have previously gone overlooked and mistaken for inclusion within the Caucasian race. Coincidentally, 1934 is same the year the PGA amended its bylaws to include a "Caucasian-only" clause. It was not until three decades later in the year 1965 when Brown's application for reinstatement was approved. Formally re-elected to class 'A' membership he was a member of the PGA once again. At the age of 66, his professional career would be short-lived as his touring days were over. Records of his actual participation in major tournaments are scarce and official date of retirement is unknown.

== Life post-golf ==
He did not let his dismissal from the PGA affect his love for the game or impact his involvement in the sport. In fact, in the year 1947, he purchased, managed, and served as the club professional at the Cedar River Golf Club located in Indian Lake, New York, in the Adirondacks. Here his teaching, playing, and crafting of clubs continued. Brown would own and operate the course and facility until his death. He lived the rest of his days in the Adirondacks and from his living quarters he would witness profound change. Specifically in regards to golf the heavily scrutinized and contested "Caucasian clause" was rescinded in the year 1961. In 1965, Brown's application for reinstatement would be approved and he was readmitted in the PGA.

== Family life and death ==
Brown died on December 22, 1973, at the age of 74. At the time of his death he was survived by his now late widow Ruth, three sons, two brothers, a sister, five grandchildren and a great-grandchild. His first born son Ronald M. Brown was also a man worthy of acknowledgement. Similarly to his father Ronald Brown was a trailblazer in his own right also being at the forefront of an African American first. Ronald Brown served the United States in World War II as a member of the famed Tuskegee Airmen. Sixty years later and a few years after his death Ronald Brown as well as his fellow Tuskegee Airmen pilots were awarded with Congressional Gold Medals for their service and achievement in the war. In June 2011, Dr. Roland Brown, (son of Major Brown and grandson of Dewey Brown, Sr.) donated his father's Congressional Gold Medal to the Adirondack Museum. There is no doubt the Brown's have left a mark in the Adirondack's but their mark left on American history is even greater. Dewey Brown's family lineage has only grown since his death as has an extensive amount of relatives left in his succession.

== Legacy ==
Brown was a pioneer in the golfing profession, being credited as the first known African American in the PGA, but, for all his on-field accomplishments, his legacy will be remembered in terms of his impact off the golf course. From humble beginnings in North Carolina, Brown was a man who climbed the ladder in his profession. He had gone from caddying at various golf clubs to becoming a professional in Professional Golfer's Association. Commonly referenced as a sincere man, Brown was an individual whose social impact can be compared with that of fellow African American trailblazer Jackie Robinson. Brown too had pioneered a sport and was a pivotal figure in the movement of racial integration of blacks in sports. In the book, Adirondack Golf Courses: Past and Present Peter Martin stated, "A black man who was to golfing what Jackie Robinson was to major league baseball: a black pioneer in a white world, a superb athlete, a sportsman and a gentleman." Brown conducted himself in a professional manner being known to his peers as a smooth-swinging and dapper fellow. He has been described by sportswriters as the 'Knight of the Fairways' because he was one of God's great gentlemen and sincerity was his trademark." His admittance, termination, and eventual re-admittance into the PGA highlighted change in America and that the fight for equality was much more than a political matter. While enjoying an illustrious career the greatest achievement of the renowned golf club maker, golf teacher, and professional golfer that was Dewey Brown was his social impact. Utilizing his rare skill set and mental fortitude, he overcame many obstacles, paving the way for future generations. Through perseverance and while displaying a great passion for the sport of golf Brown opened the proverbial door for other African American golfers to follow in his footsteps.

== See also ==
- List of African American firsts
