= October 1973 =

Month in 1973

<<	October 1973					>>
Su	Mo	Tu	We	Th	Fr	Sa
	1	2	3	4	5	6
7	8	9	10	11	12	13
14	15	16	17	18	19	20
21	22	23	24	25	26	27
28	29	30	31

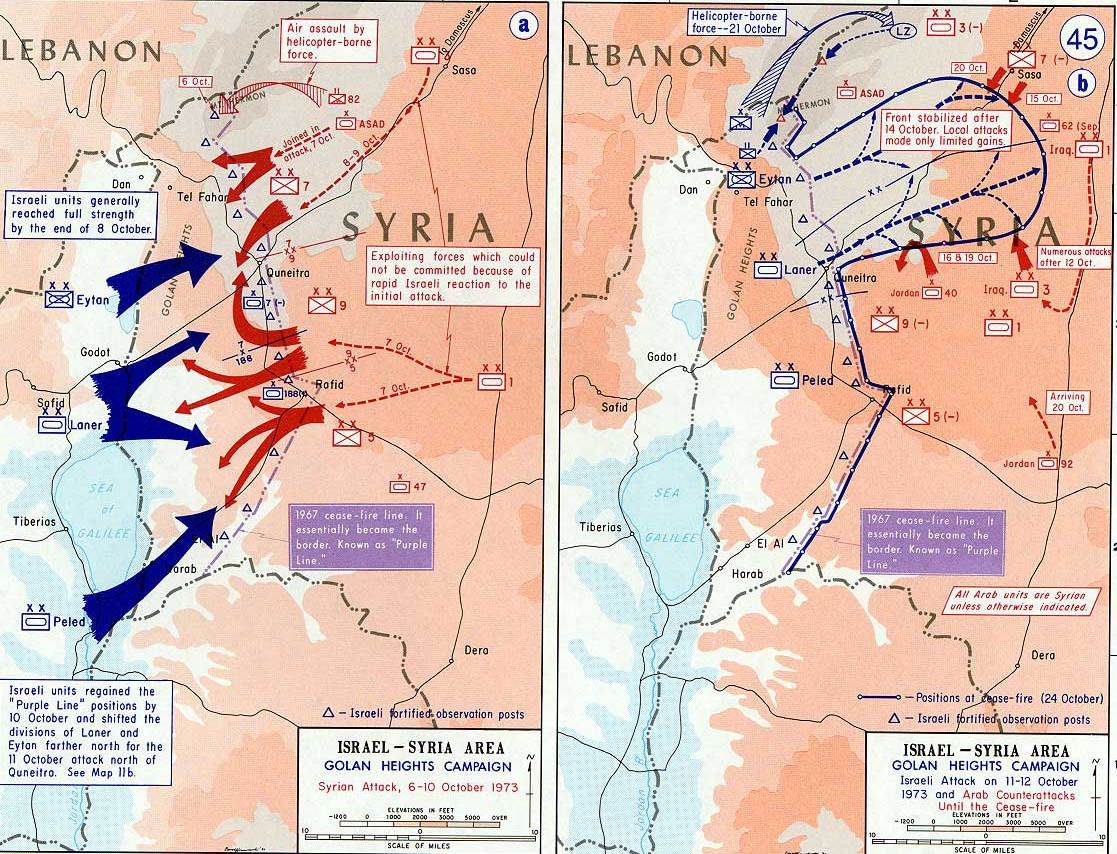
October 6, 1973: Syrian troops invade Israel from the east

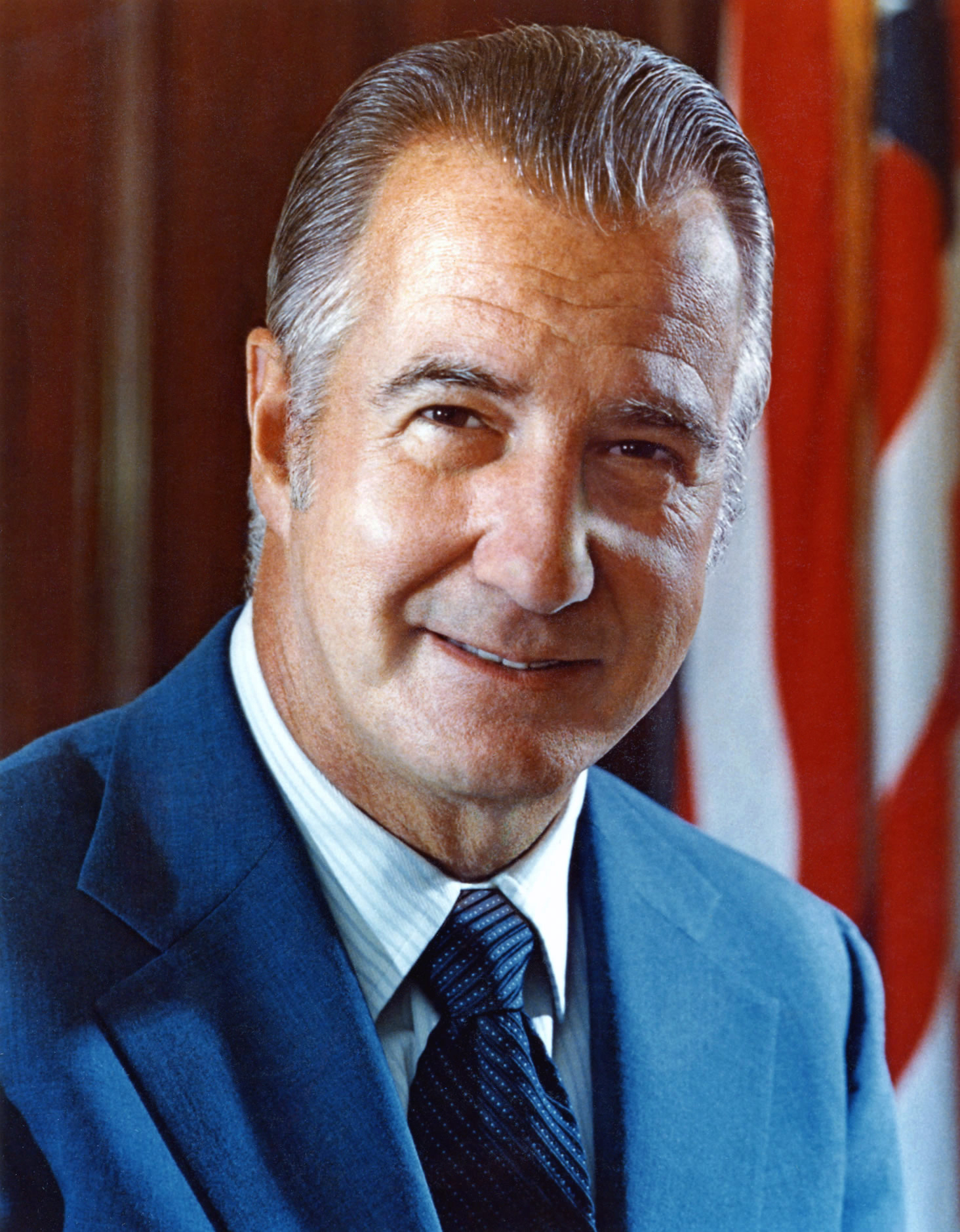
October 10, 1973: Facing criminal indictment, Spiro Agnew becomes first U.S. Vice President in more than 140 years to resign

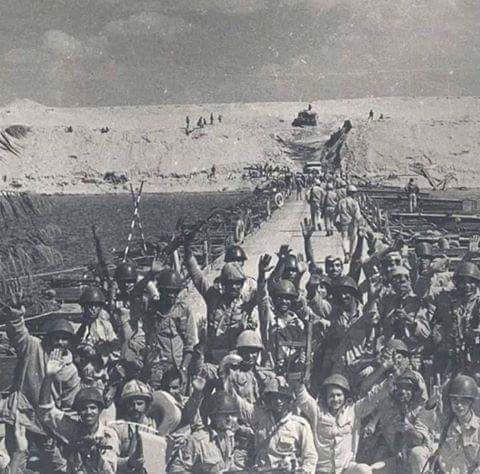
October 6, 1973: Army of Egypt recaptures the Suez Canal after six years as Yom Kippur War starts with invasion of Israel from the south

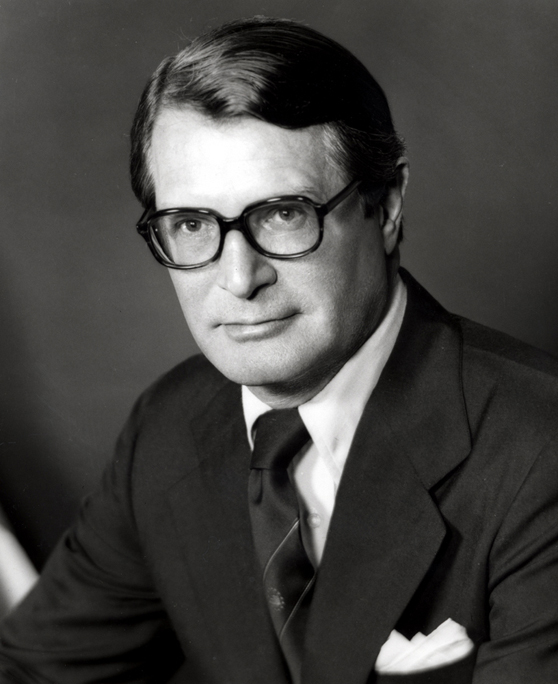
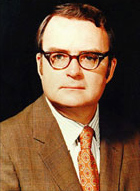
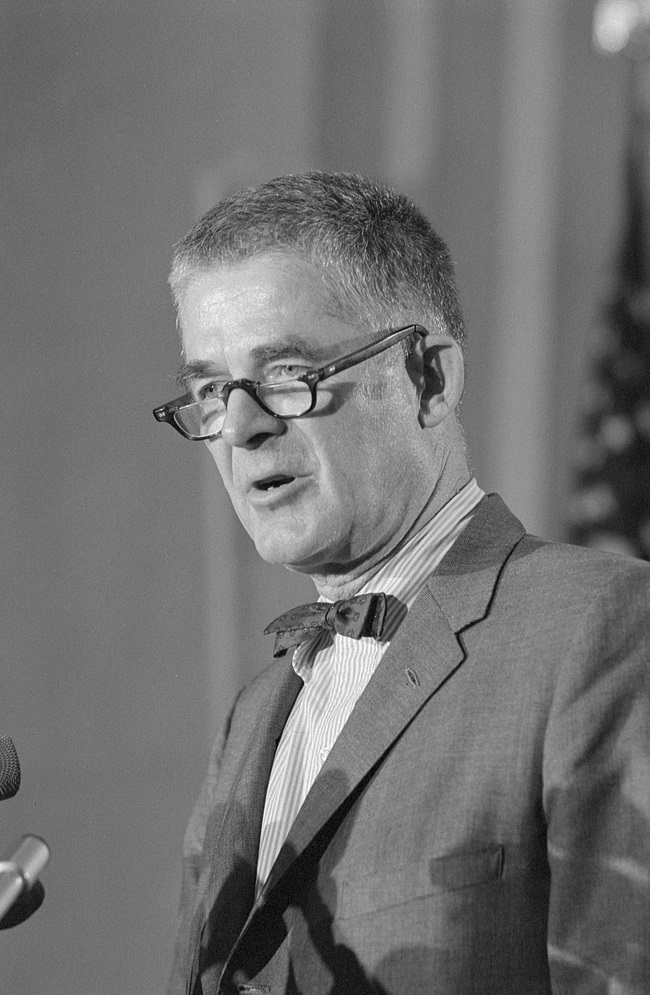
October 20, 1973: U.S. President Nixon fires Attorney General Elliott Richardson and Deputy William Ruckelshaus after they refuse to fire Watergate prosecutor Archibald Cox

The following events occurred in October 1973:

== October 1, 1973 (Monday) ==
- Spyros Markezinis was chosen by president Georgios Papadopoulos as the first prime minister of the Hellenic Republic of Greece since the overthrow of the monarchy on June 1, as the military junta of ministers stepped down.
- The accidental explosion of an antipersonnel mine at Pakistan's largest ammunition factory killed 10 people and injured 12 others at the city of Wah near Rawalpindi.
- The kingdom of Denmark legalized abortion within the first 12 weeks of pregnancy.
- The Local Government Act (Northern Ireland) 1972 took effect, replacing the six counties of Northern Ireland (Antrim, Armagh, Down, Fermanagh, Londonderry and Tyrone) with 26 local government boroughs. Eight of the new districts contained parts of different counties; Craigavon had districts from Armagh, Down and Antrim.
- Born:
  - Christian Borle, American stage actor, winner of two Tony Awards for his roles in Peter and the Starcatcher and in Something Rotten!; in Pittsburgh
  - John Mackey, American classical music composer; in New Philadelphia, Ohio
  - Devin Nunes, U.S. Congressman for California 2003 to 2022, later the CEO for former President Donald Trump's social media network, Truth Social; in Tulare, California
- Died: Mohammad Hashim Maiwandwal, 52, former Prime Minister of Afghanistan, died in a prison in Kabul 11 days after his arrest on charges of plotting to overthrow President Mohammad Daoud Khan, either by suicide or by internal bleeding caused by torture.

== October 2, 1973 (Tuesday) ==
- In a primary election race in Atlanta, Georgia, Vice Mayor Maynard Jackson, seeking to become the Southern U.S. city's first African-American mayor, with more than twice as many votes as incumbent Mayor Sam Massell, but his plurality of 47,041 votes was 47% of the vote, short of a majority. Massell had 18,946 votes for 18.9%. A runoff between Jackson and Massell took place on October 16.
- Born:
  - Melissa Harris-Perry, American TV journalist and MSNBC commentator; in Seattle
  - Lene Nystrøm, Norwegian singer-songwriter for Aqua; in Tønsberg
  - Verka Serduchka (stage name for Andriy Danylko), Ukrainian drag queen comedian; in Poltava, Ukrainian SSR
  - Susana González, Mexican TV actress; in Calera de Víctor Rosales, Zacatecas state
  - Proof (stage name for DeShaun Holton), American rapper and actor; in Detroit (d. 2006)
- Died:
  - Paavo Nurmi, 76, Finnish runner nicknamed "The Flying Finn", with nine Olympic gold medals
  - Paul Hartman, 69, American dancer and film and TV actor

== October 3, 1973 (Wednesday) ==
- The Providence Journal-Bulletin broke the news story that U.S. President Nixon had paid only $792.81 in federal income taxes in federal taxes for 1970 and only $878.03 in 1971, despite a salary of $200,000 in each year. Nixon successfully claimed a tax refund of $72,614 for 1970 and $58,889 for 1971.
- In one of the largest battles in South Vietnam in the year following the January 1973 ceasefire, the South Vietnamese Army fought the Battle of Ap Da Bien and defeated the invading North Vietnamese Army's 207th Regiment.
- The Soviet Union made the unprecedented launch of eight satellites simultaneously from the Baikonur Cosmodrome at 2:46 in the morning local time (2146 October 2 UTC), sending up Kosmos 588, 589, 590, 591, 592, 593, 594 and 595.
- East Germany's parliament, the Volkskammer, elected premier Willi Stoph to the post of head of state, as Chairman of the Council of State. Erich Honecker, the de facto leader of the communist nation as First Secretary of the Socialist Unity Party, nominated Stoph and, consistent with the policies in East European nations at the time, the Volkskammer gave its unanimous approval.
- Born:
  - Neve Campbell, Canadian TV actress known for Party of Five; in Guelph, Ontario
  - Lena Headey, Bermuda-born British actress known for Game of Thrones; in Hamilton, Bermuda
- Died: José Gregorio Liendo, 28, Chilean leftist guerrilla leader, was executed by firing squad after being convicted of the September 12 attack on the Neltume police station.

== October 4, 1973 (Thursday) ==
- The United Nations General Assembly barred South Africa's Foreign Minister, Dr. Hilgard Muller, from addressing the UN in response to criticism of the white-minority ruled nation's apartheid policy. South Africa's UN Ambassador, Carl von Hirschberg, was also denied the right to speak as part of the UN's most powerful action to that time against South Africa. The next day, General Assembly President Leopoldo Benites of Ecuador ruled that no member of the UN could be denied the right to have its representatives speak, but representatives of the other African member nations walked out as Hirschberg rose to speak. The General Assembly voted, 72 to 37, to reject the credentials of the South African representatives, although the move did not affect South Africa's membership in the UN.
- The ballet Adagio Hammerklavier, choreographed by Hans van Manen to the music of Beethoven's Piano Sonata No. 29, premiered with a performance by the Dutch National Ballet at the Stadsschouwburg theater in Amsterdam
- Died: Alfred Gottschalk, 79, German biochemist

== October 5, 1973 (Friday) ==
- Elton John released his critically-acclaimed and best-selling double album, Goodbye Yellow Brick Road, with lyrics by Bernie Taupin and John composing the music.
- Jules Léger was appointed as the new Governor General of Canada by Queen Elizabeth II, to succeed Roland Michener on January 14.
- Born: Cédric Villani, French mathematician; in Brive-la-Gaillarde, Corrèze département
- Died:
  - Milunka Savić, 85, highly-decorated Yugoslav Serbian World War One veteran and one of the most honored female combatants in the history of warfare. Savić received France's Légion d’Honneur and Croix de Guerre, Russia's Cross of St. George, and Britain's Order of St Michael and St George for heroism.
  - John Paul Chase, 71, American bank robber and murderer described by FBI Director J. Edgar Hoover as "a rat with a patriotic-sounding name", died of cancer seven years after his parole from prison.

== October 6, 1973 (Saturday) ==
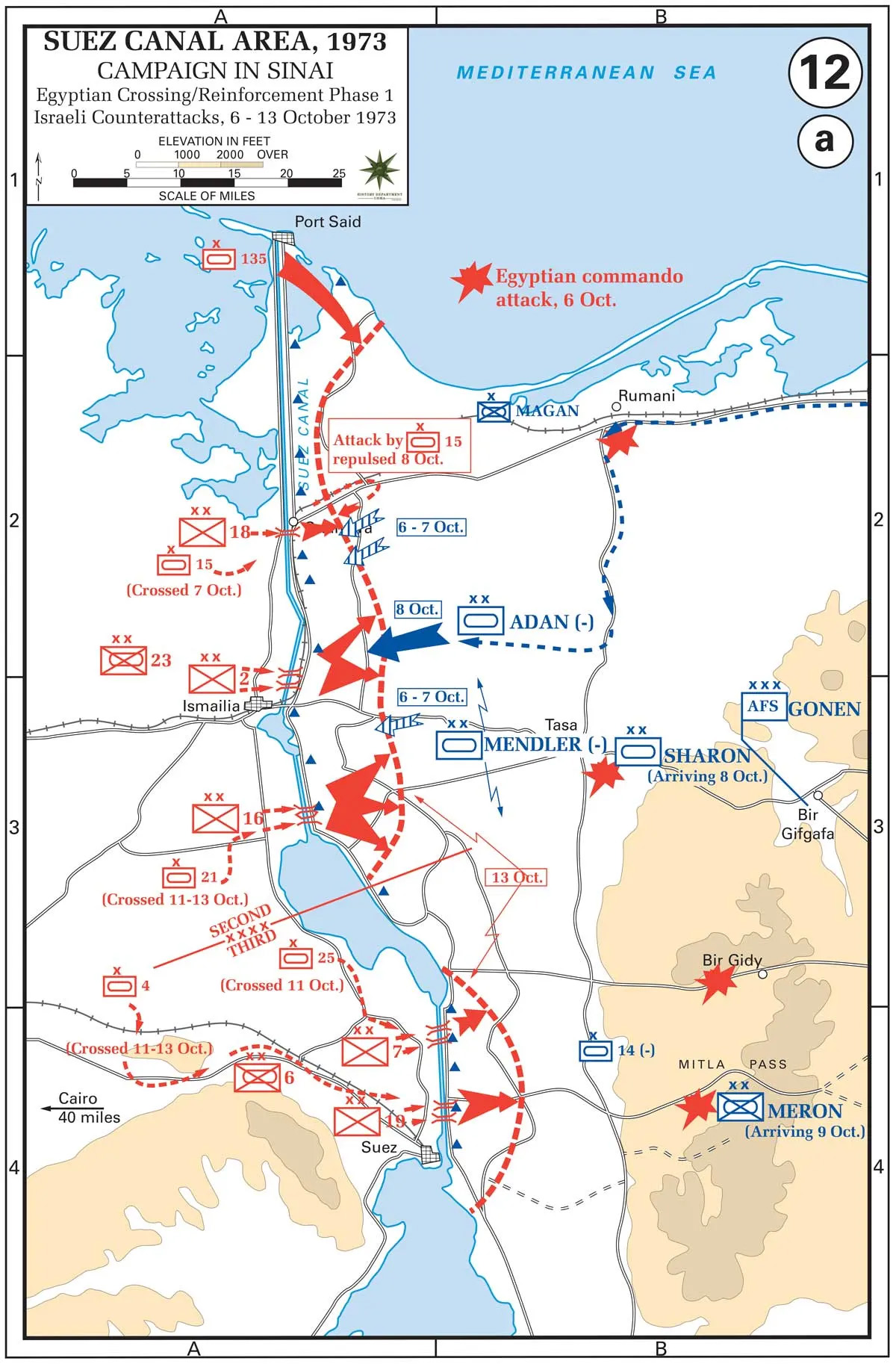
Egypt's attack on the Sinai peninsula

- Egypt and Syria staged a surprise attack on Israel with an invasion of the Israeli-occupied Sinai peninsula and the Golan Heights, beginning the Yom Kippur War. Fighting began at 2:05 in the afternoon (1205 UTC) on the post-1967 cease-fire line between Syria and Israel. The attack, stage during the Jewish Yom Kippur holiday and the Islamic Ramadan, marked the start of the fourth, and largest, Arab–Israeli conflict, after wars in 1948, 1956 and 1967.
- French Formula One driver François Cevert was killed during a qualifying round prior to the U.S. Grand Prix in Watkins Glen, New York. Cevert's teammate, world driving champion Jackie Stewart, announced his retirement after the event.
- Born:
  - Ioan Gruffudd, Welsh film and television actor known for the Hornblower films and for Fantastic Four; in Aberdare, Mid Glamorgan
  - Jeff B. Davis, American comedian and impressionist known for Whose Line Is It Anyway?; in Los Angeles
  - Rebecca Lobo, American college and WNBA basketball player and sportscaster, enshrined in the Basketball Hall of Fame; in Hartford, Connecticut
- Died:
  - Sidney Blackmer, 78, American stage and film actor, 1950 Tony Award winner for Come Back, Little Sheba (b. 1895);
  - Dick Laan, 79, Dutch children's writer known for his Pinkeltje series of books.
  - Dennis Price, 58, English television actor known for his portrayal of the valet Jeeves in the British TV series The World of Wooster, died of heart failure following a hip fracture
  - Margaret Wilson, 91, American novelist and Pulitzer prize winner (1924) for The Able McLaughlins (b. 1882)
  - Boris Agapov, 74, Soviet journalist

== October 7, 1973 (Sunday) ==
- Iraq nationalized the holdings of the two U.S. oil companies operating in the Arab nation, Exxon and Mobil, as a show of support for Egypt and Syria in their war against Israel. The Iraqi government urged other Arab nations to immediately halt the export of their oil to the U.S. and to any other nations supporting Israel.
- An attempt to assassinate the President of Cyprus, Archbishop Makarios III, failed after land mines placed along the road he was traveling exploded prematurely. Makarios was being driven from Nicosia to Sunday mass at the Greek Orthodox Church in the village of Agios Sergios and the four explosives detonated five minutes before his car would have passed over them.
- On the second day of the Yom Kippur War, the Israel Defense Force's 162nd Division destroyed 60 tanks of the Egyptian 25th Brigade in a battle in the Sinai peninsula, at the loss of only three Israeli tanks. On the same day, the Israeli Navy sank five Syrian Missile boats in the Battle of Latakia, the first naval battle in history to see combat between surface-to-surface missile-equipped missile boats and the first to make use of electronic deception.
- Born:
  - Grigol Mgaloblishvili, Prime Minister of Georgia, 2008 to 2009, Georgian representative to NATO since 2009; in Tbilisi, Georgian SSR, Soviet Union
  - Dida (Nélson de Jesus Silva), Brazilian soccer football goalkeeper with 91 caps for the Brazil national team; in Irará, Bahia state
  - Priest Holmes, American football running back, 2001 NFL rushing yards leader and 2002 NFL scoring leader; in Fort Smith, Arkansas
  - Sami Hyypiä, Finnish soccer football centre-back with 105 caps for the Finland national team; in Porvoo

== October 8, 1973 (Monday) ==
- As Syrian tanks swept across the Golan Heights, and a counter-attack against Egypt in the Sinai peninsula failed to halt an advance, Israeli Prime Minister Golda Meir gave Defense Minister Moshe Dayan an authorization to assemble Israel's 13 nuclear weapons and to distribute them to Israeli Air Force units. The nuclear bombs were to be used only if Egyptian or Syrian troops invaded Israel itself.
- The United Kingdom's 50-year monopoly on radio broadcasting came to an end as the London Broadcasting Company (LBC) became the first legal commercial radio station. Starting at 6:00 in the morning with David Jessel announcing, and operating on 720 kHz (417 meters) on the AM dial, LBC transmitted Independent Radio News reports and commentary 24 hours a day.
- Spyros Markezinis was sworn in as Greece's first civilian Prime Minister since 1967, but would be forced to resign before the end of the year after an abortive attempt to lead Greece to parliamentary rule.
- South Africa introduced postal codes for more accurate sorting and delivery of mailed items, ranging from 0002 for Pretoria, to 9781 for the Bloemfontein suburb of Botshabelo.
- Died: Gabriel Marcel, 83, French philosopher known for The Mystery of Being

== October 9, 1973 (Tuesday) ==
- Cape Kennedy in the U.S. state of Florida, site of the launches of America's crewed space missions, was restored to its former name of Cape Canaveral by vote of the U.S. Board of Geographic Names. Assistant U.S. Secretary of the Interior Stephen Wakefield signed the order restoring the former name of the Cape, which had been changed on November 28, 1963, six days after the assassination of President John F. Kennedy. The NASA headquarters on the Cape continued to be called the Kennedy Space Center.

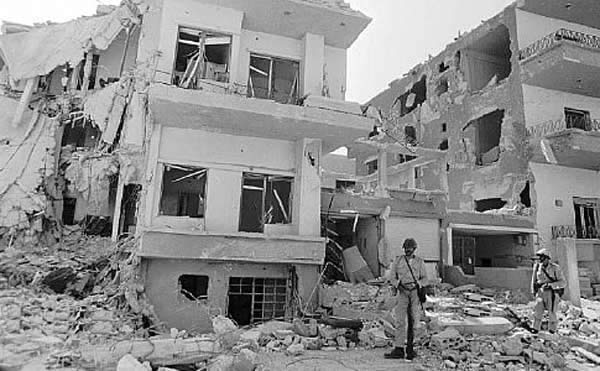
The former Syrian Army Headquarters

- Three days after the start of the Yom Kippur War and an attack by Syrian missiles against settlements in the Golan Heights, the Israeli Air Force sent seven F-4 Phantom jets on a mission to Damascus, and destroyed the Syrian Army Headquarters. The bombing also damaged the Syrian Air Force headquarters, a Soviet cultural center, and a TV station. At least 26 people were killed in the military bombing, and the Soviet Union said that 30 were killed in the destruction of the cultural center. By October 13, the Syrians had been pushed back from the Golan Heights.
- The House of Deputies of the Episcopal Church of the United States voted overwhelmingly to end its long-standing law against providing communion to church members who had remarried following a civil divorce. The House of Bishops had previously endorsed the change in rules.
- The government of the Netherlands issued a nationwide ban on Sunday driving for private motor vehicles as a means of saving gasoline during the worldwide shortage of oil.
- Born:
  - Steve Burns, American actor and television host known for the children's show Blue's Clues; in Boyertown, Pennsylvania
  - Fabio Lione, Italian singer-songwriter and keyboard player; in Pisa
- Died: Sister Rosetta Tharpe, 58, American gospel singer and electric guitarist, died of a stroke.

== October 10, 1973 (Wednesday) ==
- Spiro T. Agnew resigned as Vice President of the United States and then, in federal court in Baltimore, pled no contest to charges of income tax evasion on $29,500 he received in 1967, while he was governor of Maryland. He was fined $10,000 and put on 3 years probation. While Agnew continued to proclaim his innocence of all charges, he wrote in a letter to U.S. President Nixon that "As you are aware, the accusations against me cannot be resolved without a long, divisive and debilitating struggle, I have concluded that, painful as it is to me and my family, it is in the best interests of the nation that I relinquish the office of the Vice Presidency." Multiple witnesses had disclosed to federal prosecutors that they had given bribes to Agnew when he was Governor of Maryland, and even after he became Vice President, in hopes of remaining eligible for state and federal engineering contracts. One reported that he had gone to Agnew's vice-presidential office and handed him $2,000 in cash while verbally calling it "a political contribution".
- The Soviet Union began airlifting military supplies to Egypt and Syria to replace equipment lost in the first days of the Yom Kippur War. The U.S. responded two days later with aid to Israel.
- The U.S. Senate voted, 75 to 20, to pass the War Powers Act, prohibiting the U.S. President from committing American troops to battle for more than 90 days without authorization by Congress, and to be able to end military action by a majority vote, not subject to veto. The House of Representatives approved the bill two days later, 238 to 123. President Nixon vetoed the bill on October 24, but both houses voted to override the veto.
- The New York Mets won the fifth game of the best-3-of-5 National League Championship Series, with a 7 to 2 victory over the Cincinnati Reds.
- Born:
  - S. S. Rajamouli (Koduri Srisaila Sri Rajamouli), Indian film director and screenwriter known for blockbuster films, including the Baahubali action series; in Manvi, Mysore State
  - Mario Lopez, American actor, television personality known for Saved by the Bell as a teenager, and later as host of The X Factor; in Chula Vista, California
- Died: Ludwig von Mises, 92, Ukrainian-born American economist and sociologist

== October 11, 1973 (Thursday) ==
- The White House received a phone call from 10 Downing Street asking if U.S. President Richard Nixon would be available to speak with the Prime Minister of the United Kingdom about the ongoing Yom Kippur War. Since President Nixon was intoxicated, U.S. Secretary of State Henry Kissinger and administration assistant Brent Scowcroft decided that the Prime Minister could either speak with Kissinger or wait.
- Baseball's defending national champions, the Oakland A's won the fifth game of the best-3-of-5 American League Championship Series, with a 3 to 0 victory over the Baltimore Orioles, and proceeded to the World Series against the New York Mets. Despite good weather and the importance of the game, the Oakland–Alameda County Coliseum was only slightly more than half full, with 24,265 people filling the nearly 48,000 seats.
- The Pascagoula Abduction, one of the more famous claims of a human encounter with extraterrestrial beings, began as two men told police that they had been taken aboard a spaceship by three "crab-clawed beings with wrinkled skin and pointed ears." Charles Hickson and Calvin Parker reported to authorities in Jackson County, Mississippi, that they had been fishing on a pier on the Pascagoula River when the incident occurred.
- A National Christmas Tree was placed in Washington D.C. for the 101st time, and began a tradition of using living trees that had been transplanted, after 100 years of using trees that had been cut down. The Colorado blue spruce had fallen off of a flatbed truck while being transported from Shickshinny, Pennsylvania, although it continued to be used for Christmas in 1974, 1975 and 1976.
- Born: Steven Pressley, Scottish soccer football centre-back and Scottish national team member; in Elgin, Moray

== October 12, 1973 (Friday) ==
- The first husband and wife team to be elected president and vice president of a nation took office as Juan Peron and Isabel Peron were sworn into office.
- In response to the October 10 shipment of replacement weapons to Egypt and Syria, U.S. President Nixon authorized Operation Nickel Grass, an airlift of replacement weapons to Israel and on October 19, fifty A-4 aircraft were flown to Israel by the U.S. Navy's Patrol Squadron 92. The Arab nations would respond with a cut in their exports of oil to the United States.
- U.S. Representative Gerald R. Ford, the Minority Leader of the House of Representatives, was nominated by U.S. President Nixon to succeed Spiro Agnew as Vice President of the United States. According to the Washington Post, Nixon's first choice, former U.S. Treasury Secretary and Texas Governor John B. Connally, said in a phone discussion with White House Chief of Staff Alexander Haig that he doubted that he could be confirmed by the U.S. Senate; Nixon's other three potential nominees under consideration were New York Governor Nelson Rockefeller, California Governor Ronald Reagan, and U.S. Attorney General Elliot L. Richardson.
- A U.S. Senate subcommittee inadvertently revealed the existence of a federal intelligence agency so secret that even its name was classified. The disclosure came in a report by the Senate Committee on Secret and Confidential Documents and mentioned the National Reconnaissance Office (NRO) as an example of an intelligence group that Congress should know about. One intelligence official said later, "Hell, even its initials were supposed to be classified."
- Born: Martin Corry, English rugby union flanker with 64 caps for the England national team; in Birmingham
- Died: Peter Aufschnaiter, 73, Austrian mountaineer and cartographer profiled in the book Seven Years in Tibet

== October 13, 1973 (Saturday) ==
- All 122 passengers and crew on Aeroflot Flight 964 were killed when the Tu-104 jet crashed during its approach to Domodedovo Airport in Moscow following its departure from Kutaisi in the Georgian SSR. An electrical power failure on the aircraft disabled its navigation system. The jet struck power lines roughly 10 miles (16 km) from the runway while tilted to the left at a 70° angle. Among those killed was Lieutenant General Fyodor Bondarenko, Chief of the Soviet Union's anti-aircraft missile defense.
- The first father-son combination in major league U.S. sports was unveiled as ice hockey legend Gordie Howe was joined by his sons Marty Howe and Mark Howe for the Houston Aeros' opening game in the World Hockey Association against the Los Angeles Sharks.
- Born:
  - Matt Hughes, American mixed martial artist and UFC welterweight champion 2001-2006; in Hillsboro, Illinois
  - Seenu Ramasamy, Indian film director; in Madurai, Tamil Nadu state
  - Brian Dawkins, American NFL defensive back; in Jacksonville, Florida
  - Sebastián Beltrame, Uruguayan TV producer; in Montevideo
- Died:
  - Cevat Şakir Kabaağaçlı (pen name for Musa Cevat Şakir), 87, Cretan Turkish novelist
  - Israeli Defense Forces Major General Albert Mandler, 44, a native of Austria, was killed by an Egyptian artillery strike in the Yom Kippur War
  - John Neville Wheeler, 87, American newspaper publisher
  - Carlos Fariña, 13, the youngest victim of the political murders by Chile's Pinochet regime; in Huechuraba

== October 14, 1973 (Sunday) ==
- Soldiers in Thailand killed 77 protesters and wounded 857 as more than 100,000 demonstrated against the military government. An estimated 280 students and 20 police and soldiers were killed after five days of protests before Field Marshal Thanom Kittikachorn and his deputy, Field Marshal Praphas Charusathien, resigned along with the military cabinet that evening. Two days later, King Bhumibol Adulyadej appointed Sanya Dharmasakti to head a 14-man cabinet dominated by civilians.
- Voting was held in Turkey for the 450-seat Grand National Assembly. The Republican People's Party (CHP) of Bülent Ecevit gained 42 seats to win 185, while the Justice Party of Prime Minister Naim Talu dropped from a 256-seat control to only 149 seats.
- A fire destroyed 18 city blocks and more than 300 buildings in the small city of Chelsea, Massachusetts.
- Born: George Floyd, American victim of police brutality whose death during an arrest prompted nationwide protests across the United States for police conduct reform; in Fayetteville, North Carolina (killed 2020)
- Died:
  - Edmund A. Chester, 76, American broadcasting executive and senior vice president of the CBS radio and television networks during the 1940s
  - Egyptian Army General Ahmed Hamdi, 44, military engineer who guided the installation of the pontoon bridge across the Suez Canal, was killed in battle during the Yom Kippur War.
  - Jean Mouroux, 72, French Roman Catholic theologian

== October 15, 1973 (Monday) ==
- The Israeli Army reversed the course of the Yom Kippur War as its tanks and armored divisions retook control of the west bank of the Suez Canal. Within a week the Israelis were within 50 miles (80 km) of Cairo and had surrounded and trapped the 20,000 officers and soldiers of the 3rd Egyptian Army.
- Typhoon Ruth crossed Luzon, Philippines, killing 27 people and causing $5 million in damage.
- The United Nations General Assembly elected five new non-permanent members to the 15-member United Nations Security Council, with the Byelorussian SSR, part of the Soviet Union but a separate UN member, being on the Council with one of the permanent members, the Soviet Union, for a two-year term. The other four new members elected were Cameroon, Costa Rica, Iraq, and Mauritania.

== October 16, 1973 (Tuesday) ==
- Prime Ministers Edward Heath of the United Kingdom and Olafur Johannesson of Iceland met in London and reached an interim agreement to end the Cod War that had arisen between the Icelandic government and British fishing trawlers.
- For the first time, the member nations of the Organization of Petroleum Exporting Countries (OPEC) set the price for oil without consultation with the world's seven major oil corporations more than doubled the price for oil from $2.18 per barrel to $5.12 per barrel.
- Henry Kissinger of the U.S. and Le Duc Tho of North Vietnam were awarded the Nobel Peace Prize for their role in negotiating the end to the Vietnam War. Le Duc Tho refused the prize, however, and informed the Nobel Committee that "When guns are silenced, and peace is really restored in South Vietnam, I will reconsider the acceptance of this prize."
- Trygve Bratteli became the new Prime Minister of Norway as outgoing premier Lars Korvald handed over the keys to the office following the swearing-in ceremony.
- Maynard Jackson was elected as the first African-American mayor of a major city in the Deep South, as voters overwhelmingly approved him over incumbent mayor Sam Massell in a runoff election.
- An armed gunman kidnapped the ambassadors to Cuba from Belgium and France in a bid to have safe passage from the Communist nation. The gunman first invaded the home of Belgium's Ambassador Jean Somershausen and took him hostage, then forced him and two other captives to drive to the French Embassy.
- The Tomorrow Show, a late night talk show hosted by Tom Snyder on the NBC television network in the U.S., premiered at 1:00 in the morning, after the close of Monday night's Tonight Show with Johnny Carson.
- Born: Justin Credible (ring name for Peter J. Polaco), American professional wrestler and Extreme Championship Wrestling heavyweight champion 1999-2000; in Waterbury, Connecticut
- Died:
  - Gene Krupa, 64, American big band drummer known for pioneering the modern drumset, died of leukemia
  - Emil Praeger, 75, American civil engineer

== October 17, 1973 (Wednesday) ==
- Eleven Arab nations in the OPEC imposed an oil embargo against countries they deem to have helped Israel in the Yom Kippur War, announcing that they would cut their oil production by five percent, and to cut it by an additional 5% of every month thereafter (implying no exports at all by the end of September 1974) unless Israel agreed to withdraw completely from its occupied territories.
- U.S. district judge John J. Sirica ruled that the Senate Watergate Committee was not entitled to have access to the Watergate-related tape recordings of President Nixon, but that the U.S. Department of Justice special prosecutor, Archibald Cox, could subpoena the tapes as evidence.
- Martin Cooper, John F. Mitchell and other members of Motorola Corporation's portable communication products division filed the patent application for the DynaTAC, the first hand-held cellular telephone. U.S. Patent No. 3,906,166 would be granted slightly less than two years later, on September 16, 1975.
- The England national football team failed to qualify for the final round of soccer football's FIFA World Cup for the first time since it entered the competition in 1950. England and Poland played to 1 to 1 draw, four months after Poland had defeated England, 2 to 0, on June 6. Poland, which had a record of 2 wins, 1 draw and 1 loss against England and Wales, went to the World Cup instead, as one of the eight European nations in the field of 16 teams.
- Born: Bhagwant Mann, Indian politician and Chief Minister of Punjab state's 28 million residents since 2022; in Satoj village, Punjab
- Died:
  - Ingeborg Bachmann, 47, Austrian author and poet, died from injuries sustained in a fire.
  - Nicholas Tomalin, 42, British war correspondent, was killed by a Syrian missile attack on the Golan Heights while reporting on the Yom Kippur War.

== October 18, 1973 (Thursday) ==
- Saudi Arabia's embargo of oil exports to the U.S. began as the Middle Eastern kingdom cut its oil production by 10 percent for the rest of the month, and threatened to halt its oil shipments entirely unless the U.S. halted all military aid to Israel. At the time, the U.S. imported more oil from Canada and Venezuela, but 6% of its oil usage was of Saudi Arabian crude. By the end of the month, Arab oil production had been cut by 20% and the available worldwide supply from all nations had dropped by 12%.
- Abu Dhabi, the chief emirate of the United Arab Emirates, announced that it was halting all exports of oil to the United States, becoming the first Arab oil producer to completely stop shipments.
- The Chilean Army's Caravan of Death, led by General Sergio Arellano, arrived in Antofagasta and carried out the executions of 56 leftist prisoners who had been summarily arrested after the September 11 coup d'etat. General Joaquin Lagos, the military governor of the Antofagasta province, was outraged at the murders, many of which were carried out after torture and cutting with machetes. Lagos turned in his resignation to President Augusto Pinochet, and the Caravan's activities ended four days later.
- Serial killers Willie Steelman and Douglas Gretzler committed the first of 17 murders over a 22-day period, starting with the stabbing to death of Kenneth Unrein and Michael Adshade. The pair would be captured the day after killing 9 people in a household on November 7, 1973.
- Raisin, the Tony Award-winning Broadway musical adapted from the 1959 play A Raisin in the Sun, premiered at the 46th Street Theatre, for the first of 847 performances.
- Born:
  - James Foley, American photographer and foreign journalist murdered by the ISIS terrorist group; in Evanston, Illinois (d. 2014)
  - Rachel Nichols, American journalist and sportscaster; in Potomac, Maryland
  - Michalis Kapsis, Greek soccer football centre-back for the Greek National Team; in Piraeus
  - Sarah Winckless, English rower with two world championships; in Reading, Berkshire
- Died:
  - Walt Kelly, 60, American cartoonist and author of the comic strip Pogo, died of a cerebral thrombosis and complications of diabetes.
  - Leo Strauss, 74, German-American political philosopher
  - Crane Wilbur, 86, American film actor and screenwriter
  - Soong Ai-ling, 84, Chinese businesswoman and founder of the Sandai Company

== October 19, 1973 (Friday) ==
- President Nixon rejected an Appeals Court decision that he turn over the Watergate tapes to investigators, and said instead that he would have the tapes transcribed by his own staff and reviewed by U.S. Senator John C. Stennis, a Democrat for Mississippi, for accuracy. Special Watergate Prosecutor Archibald Cox rejected the offer and announced his objections and intent to pursue further action, complaining that Nixon's proposal would "defeat the fair administration of criminal justice," a statement that would lead to Cox's firing the next day.
- Libya announced that it would halt all oil exports to the U.S., the second nation to do so.
- Elizabeth II officially assumed the title of "Queen of Australia" during her visit to Canberra with the signing of royal assent to an amendment to the Royal Styles and Titles Act. Her previous title had been "Elizabeth the second, by the grace of God, of the United Kingdom, Australia and her other realms and territories, queen, head of the Commonwealth."
- Born
  - Hicham Arazi, Moroccan tennis player
  - Neal Brennan, American comedian, director and podcaster, in Villanova, Pennsylvania
  - Okan Buruk, Turkish footballer and manager
  - Joaquin Gage, Canadian ice hockey player
- Died: Margaret C. Anderson, 86, American publisher who founded The Little Review

== October 20, 1973 (Saturday) ==
- What became known as the "Saturday Night Massacre" took place as U.S. President Nixon fired U.S. Attorney General Elliot Richardson and Deputy Attorney General William Ruckelshaus, after both refused to fire special Watergate prosecutor Archibald Cox. The third highest-ranking U.S. Justice Department official, Robert Bork, finally fired Cox at Nixon's request.
- Saudi Arabia and Algeria announced they had halted all oil and liquefied gas exports to the United States, becoming the third and fourth Arab oil producing nations to do so.

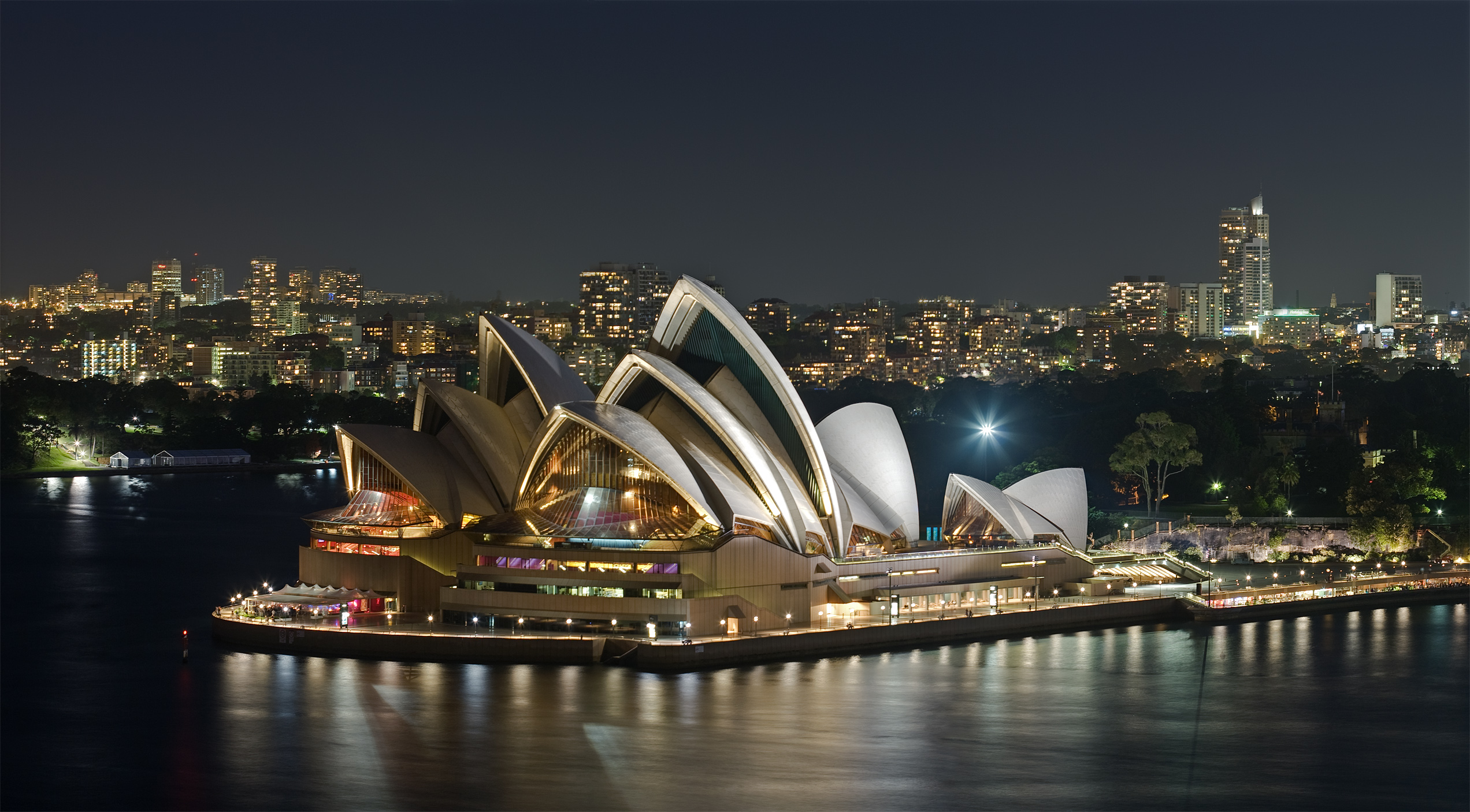
The Sydney Opera House in 2008

- The Sydney Opera House was opened by Queen Elizabeth II after 14 years of construction. The Queen told spectators, "Controversy of the most extreme kind attended the building of the pyramids, yet they stand today— 4,000 years later — acknowledged as one of the wonders of the world. I believe this will be so for the Sydney Opera House. The Opera House will have something the pyramids never had— it will have life."
- Bong Kee Chok, leader of the North Kalimantan Communist Party in Malaysia, ended the 17-month rebellion in Sarawak and surrendered to Sarawak's Chief Minister, Abdul Rahman Ya'kub.
- The first of the "Zebra murders", at least 15 killings over less than six months in San Francisco, by a group of four African-Americans who called themselves the "Death Angels", began with the kidnapping of Quita Hague and her husband, Richard Hague, as they were walking near their home. Quita Hague's body was found, nearly decapitated, four miles away. Richard Hague survived after being beaten unconscious, and was able to give a description of three assailants. Over slightly more than two months, seven more people were killed by the end of 1973. The suspects would be arrested on May 1, 1974.
- Born: Larisa Gribaleva, Belarusian singer, actress and TV host; in Polotsk, Byelorussian SSR, Soviet Union
- Died:
  - Norman Chandler, 74, American newspaper executive, publisher of the Los Angeles Times (1945–1960).
  - Angelo DeCarlo, 71, U.S. loansharking boss for the Genovese crime family, died of cancer less than a year after U.S. President Nixon had commuted his 12-year prison term.
  - Ilya Gabay, 38, Soviet Russian dissident and writer, committed suicide after continued harassment following his release from prison.
  - Australian Army Lieutenant General Henry Wells, 75, Chairman, Chiefs of Staff Committee of the Australian Armed Forces from 1958 to 1959

== October 21, 1973 (Sunday) ==
- The Oakland A's defeated the New York Mets, 5–2 in Game 7 of the best-4-of-7 to win the World Series, 4 games to 3.
- Piloted by Heino Brditschka, the first flight of an all-electric airplane took place as the Militky MB-E1 took off under its own power from Linz in Austria and flew for nine minutes and 5 seconds. The silent airplane used a nickel-cadmium battery and had been designed by Fred Militky.
- Bahrain, Kuwait, Qatar and Dubai announced that they would ban all shipments of oil to the United States. The move brought the number of Arab nations reducing the export of oil to the U.S. to eight.
- Fred Dryer of the Los Angeles Rams became the first player in NFL history to score two safeties in the same game. The 24-7 win for the Rams over the Green Bay Packers came on consecutive safeties in the fourth quarter from sacks in the end zone by Dryer of Green Bay quarterbacks Scott Hunter and Jim Del Gaizo.
- Born:
  - Lera Auerbach, Russian-American pianist and composer; in Chelyabinsk, Russian SFSR, Soviet Union
  - Angkhana Phanprateep, Thai voice actress; in Bangkok
- Died: Nasif Estéfano, 40, Argentine Formula One race car driver, was killed in a car crash at a race in Aimogasta.

== October 22, 1973 (Monday) ==
- A ceasefire began between Egypt and Israel at 6:50 in the evening local time (1650 UTC) after both nations agreed to United Nations Security Council Resolution 338, a call for a halt in hostilities. Fighting continued between Syria and Israel. The truce was violated almost immediately, and fighting resumed again hours later.
- Born:
  - Ichiro Suzuki, Japanese baseball star in Nippon Professional Baseball (for the Orix Blue Wave) and Major League Baseball (for the Seattle Mariners) star, MVP in the American League (2001) and the Pacific League (1994, 1995, 1996); in Nishikasugai, Aichi Prefecture
  - Carmen Ejogo, British film and TV actress; in Kensington, London
- Died:
  - Pablo Casals, 96, Spanish Catalan cellist
  - David Franklin, 65, British opera singer

== October 23, 1973 (Tuesday) ==
- President Nixon agreed to turn over subpoenaed audio tapes of his Oval Office conversations to U.S. federal judge John J. Sirica. The tapes released pursuant to Sirica's order included the June 20, 1972, conversation with an 18½-minute portion erased, but not the June 23, 1972 tape that would eventually force Nixon's resignation. Nixon's release of tapes temporarily halted a move within the House of Representatives for Nixon's impeachment.
- Born: Christian Dailly, Scottish centre-back footballer with 67 appearances for the Scottish National Team; in Dundee
- Died:
  - Douglas Young, 60, Scottish poet and politician who led the Scottish National Party from 1942-1945 (b. June 5, 1913)
  - William Templeton, 60, Scottish playwright and TV scriptwriter (b. June 7, 1913)

== October 24, 1973 (Wednesday) ==
- U.S. President Nixon vetoed the War Powers Act, passed 75 to 20 in the U.S. Senate on October 10 and 238 to 123 by the U.S. House of Representatives on October 12. The proposed law, described by one reporter as "the most serious effort in U.S. history to curb presidential power to commit American forces without congressional approval," was criticized by Nixon as unconstitutional. With the House having passed the legislation three votes short of a two-thirds majority, the possibility remained that the veto could not be overridden. On November 7, however, the House would vote 284 to 135 to override and the Senate would follow the same day, 75 to 18.
- Canada's House of Commons voted, 119 to 106, to extend its limitation on capital punishment for an additional four years, or until December 28, 1977. The death penalty was limited to persons who killed prison guards or on-duty police officers.
- A new ceasefire went into effect in the Yom Kippur War at 7:00 in the morning local time in Israel and Egypt. Both sides had agreed to a ceasefire two days earlier, but full-scale fighting had resumed the next day.
- As part of the European Cup tournament in soccer football for the cup winners of Europe's leagues, the champions of West Germany and East Germany played against each other for the first time, after both teams advanced to the 16-team second round. West German champion FC Bayern Munich (which finished first in the Bundesliga and East German champion Dynamo Dresden (which finished in first place in the DDR-Oberliga played in Munich at the Olympiastadion before 47,913 spectators, almost all West Germans, with Munich beating Dresdent, 4 to 3. The teams played the second leg of the two-game aggregate series on November 7 at Rudolf-Harbig-Stadion in Dresden, a 3 to 3 draw before 35,334 fans.
- The U.S. television crime drama series Kojak, starring Telly Savalas, premiered with the first of 118 episodes over five seasons.
- Born:
  - Jeff Wilson, New Zealand multisport athlete who played rugby union for the All Blacks and cricket for the Black Caps; in Invercargill
  - Levi Leipheimer, American professional cyclist and two time U.S. national champion; in Butte, Montana
  - Jackie McNamara, Scottish footballer with 33 caps for the national team; in Glasgow
  - Laura Veirs, American singer-songwriter and guitarist; in Colorado Springs, Colorado
  - Meelis Friedenthal, Estonian author; in Viljandi, Estonian SSR

== October 25, 1973 (Thursday) ==
- Shortly after midnight, President Nixon ordered a worldwide military alert of all U.S. military forces after concluding that the Soviet Union was "planning to send a very substantial force" to intervene militarily against Israel in the Middle East war. Nixon said the next day, "The purpose of that was to indicate to the Soviet Union that we could not accept any unilateral move on their part to move military forces into the Mideast." Nixon sent an urgent message to Soviet leader Leonid Brezhnev and explained "I indicated to him our reasoning, and I urged that we not proceed along that course and that, instead, that we join in the United Nations in supporting a resolution which would exclude any major powers from participating in a peacekeeping force."
- Egypt and Israel accepted United Nations Security Council Resolution 340 as the UN created a peacekeeping force that would have neither Soviet nor American troops.
- The Local Government (Scotland) Act 1973 was given royal assent by Queen Elizabeth II, reorganizing Scotland's 33 shires into nine regions and three islands, effective May 16, 1975. Each of the regions, in turn, was divided into districts.
- As nations worldwide developed responses to the shortage of oil and gasoline, Lebanon became the first to institute a plan to cut the number of cars being driven in half based on the last digit of the license plate number; cars with even-numbered plates could only drive on even-numbered days, those with odd-numbered plates only on odd-numbered days.
- Born:
  - Lamont Bentley, American TV actor known for Moesha and for The Parkers; in Milwaukee (died in a car accident, 2005)
  - Michael Weston, American TV and film actor; in New York City
  - Reza Yazdani, Iranian singer and song composer; in Tehran
- Died:
  - Abebe Bikila, 41, Ethiopian distance runner who won the 1960 Olympic marathon; from a cerebral hemorrhage
  - Cleo Moore, 48, American film actress

== October 26, 1973 (Friday) ==
- The United Nations recognized the independence of Guinea-Bissau.
- The government of South Korea freed opposition leader Kim Dae Jung from house arrest, almost three months after he had been kidnapped from a hotel in Japan.
- California's Alcatraz Island and the federal prison building that had been located there, were both opened by the U.S. Park Service as a tourist attraction.
- Born:
  - Seth MacFarlane, American comedian, TV and film producer, and actor, known for Family Guy and Ted; in Kent, Connecticut
  - Austin Healey, English rugby union scrum half with 51 caps for the English national team; in Wallasey, Cheshire
  - Taka Michinoku (ring name for Takao Yoshida), Japanese WWF wrestler; in Morioka, Iwate prefecture
- Died: Marshal Semyon Budyonny, 90, one of the original five people to hold the title Marshal of the Soviet Union and the last surviving aide to Joseph Stalin

== October 27, 1973 (Saturday) ==
- The governments of Egypt and Israel announced a ceasefire in the Yom Kippur War and their agreement to a United Nations-sponsored meeting of their military representatives to discuss a peaceful settlement. The United Nations Security Council voted, 14 to 0, to approve a 7,000-person peacekeeping force to be deployed in the Sinai peninsula for six months. The People's Republic of China did not vote or attempt to veto the resolution but said that it would not pay for the force.
- The Canon City meteorite, a 1.4-kilogram (3.1 lb) chondrite type meteorite, struck Earth in Fremont County, Colorado.
- Born:
  - Semmy Schilt, Dutch kick-boxer, mixed martial artist and K-1 champion; in Rotterdam
  - Karol Beffa, French-born Swiss classical music composer; in Paris
- Died: Lawrence Kubie, 77, American psychiatrist and psychoanalyst

== October 28, 1973 (Sunday) ==
- Voting took place in Portugal for the unicameral Assembleia da República, after the 65 opposition candidates withdrew from the ballot on October 25. The Acção Nacional Popular (National People's Action) party of Prime Minister Marcelo Caetano won all 150 seats.
- In Spain, police in Barcelona raided a church and arrested 113 members of the separatist Democratic Forces of Catalonia and charged them with being opponents of Spain's dictator Francisco Franco.
- Born: Andrea Helms, U.S. gospel singer; in Odessa, Texas
- Died:
  - Taha Hussein, 83, Egyptian writer and intellectual
  - Judith C. Waller, 84, American radio and television broadcasting pioneer
  - Sergio Tofano, 87, Italian actor, director, and playwright

== October 29, 1973 (Monday) ==
- The Universidad de la República Uruguay in Montevideo, the only university in the South American nation of Uruguay, was closed by order of the military government, on grounds that the institution of higher learning was a center of Marxist agitation. Troops and police had raided the state-owned university a day after one of the students had been killed by his own homemade bomb and reported finding "large caches of arms, ammunition and subversive political literature."
- Voters in the Canadian province of Quebec overwhelmingly favored of the ruling Quebec Liberal Party (PLQ) of Premier Robert Bourassa, in elections for the provincial parliament campaigned almost solely on whether Quebec should be independent from the rest of Canada. The PLQ won 102 of the 110 seats in the unicameral National Assembly of Quebec.
- Born:
  - Vonetta Flowers, American bobsledder and the first African-American woman to win an Olympic gold medal; in Birmingham, Alabama
  - Robert Pires, French soccer football midfielder with 79 appearances for the France National Team; in Reims, Marne département
  - Pierre Png, Singaporean TV actor; in Singapore

== October 30, 1973 (Tuesday) ==
- The Bosphorus Bridge in Turkey was completed, connecting the continents of Europe and Asia over the Bosphorus for the second time, and for the first time since a pontoon bridge had been created by the Emperor Darius of Persia in 512 BC. Darius had lashed together 340 ships to create the temporary bridge. The opening of the 3,222 feet (982 m) long suspension bridge coincided with the fiftieth anniversary of the proclamation of the Republic of Turkey.
- The government of the Netherlands issued a nationwide ban on Sunday driving, beginning November 4, for private motor vehicles as a means of saving gasoline during the worldwide shortage of oil.
- The Judiciary Committee of the U.S. House of Representatives voted, 21 to 17, to begin consideration of the possible impeachment of U.S. President Nixon. The vote was split along party lines, with 21 Democrats voting for and 17 Republicans voting against.
- The cause of action that led to the landmark U.S. Supreme Court decision in FCC v. Pacifica Foundation began as the New York City radio station WBAI broadcast a recording of comedian George Carlin's "Seven dirty words" routine.
- Born:
  - Maggie Haberman, American political journalist and bestselling author; in New York City
  - Edge (ring name for Adam J. Copeland), Canadian professional wrestler and actor; in Orangeville, Ontario
  - Ricardo Barroso Barroso, Mexican interior designer; in Mexico City
  - Silvia Corzo, Colombian lawyer and TV journalist; in Bucaramanga

== October 31, 1973 (Wednesday) ==
- Three Provisional IRA members escaped from Dublin's Mountjoy Prison, aboard a hijacked helicopter that landed in the exercise yard. The helicopter rescued IRA leader Seamus Twomey, along with J. B. O'Hagan and Kevin Mallon.
- Color television was introduced to New Zealand as the New Zealand Broadcasting Corporation (NZBC) introduced transmissions using the Phase Alternating Line (PAL) system that was the standard in most of Europe, Asia, Africa and South America.
- A U.S. Secret Service agent testified to the Watergate grand jury that two of the nine subpoenaed Watergate tapes did not actually exist. One was a June 20, 1972, conversation that had taken place between U.S. President Nixon and John N. Mitchell, the director of the Committee for the Re-election of the President three days after the Watergate burglars had been arrested. The other was a conversation on April 15, 1973, between Nixon and White House counsel John Dean, the day before Dean was fired.
- Born: Abel Briones Ruiz, Mexican business owner and accused drug trafficker; in Matamoros, Tamaulipas
- Died:
  - Paul Dudley White, 87, American heart surgeon who had provided life-saving treatment to U.S. President Eisenhower in 1955
  - Lucha Reyes, Peruvian singer, 37, died of cardiac arrest one day after appearing on a radio broadcast and debuting her new single "Mi Última Canción" ("My Last Song").
