= September 1973 =

Month of 1973

<<	September 1973					>>
Su	Mo	Tu	We	Th	Fr	Sa
						1
2	3	4	5	6	7	8
9	10	11	12	13	14	15
16	17	18	19	20	21	22
23	24	25	26	27	28	29
30

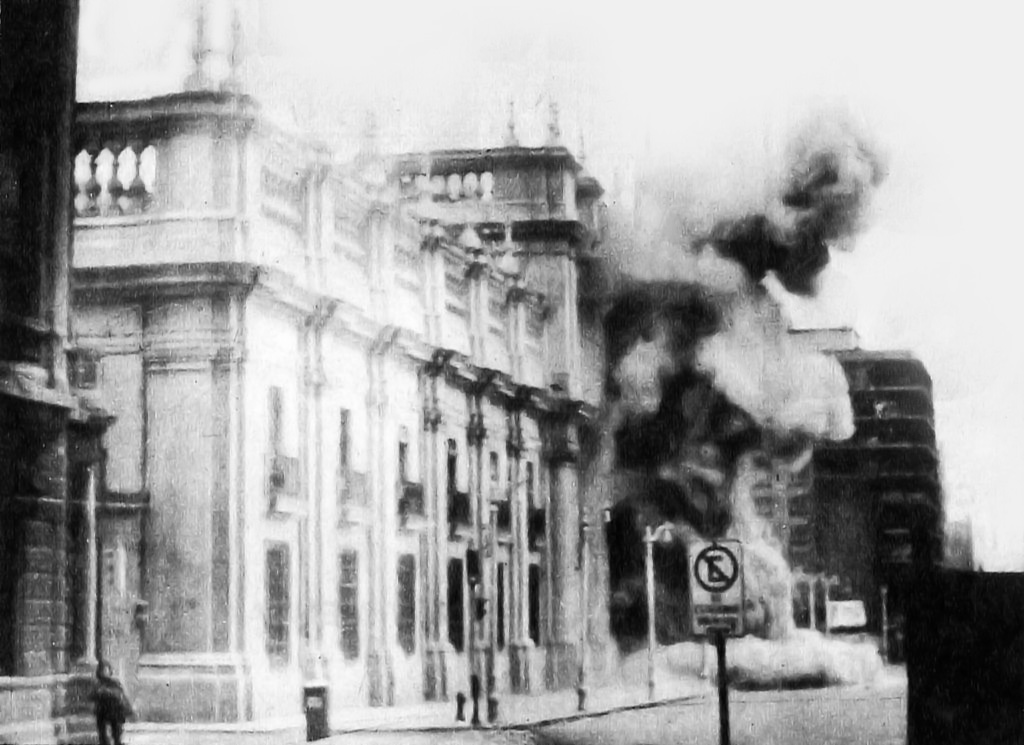
September 11, 1973: Chile's presidential palace bombed as military coup d'état kills President Salvador Allende

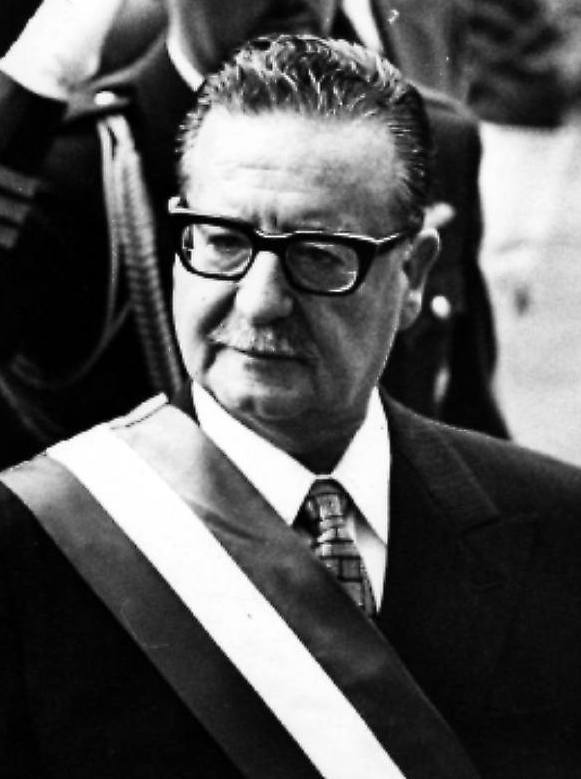
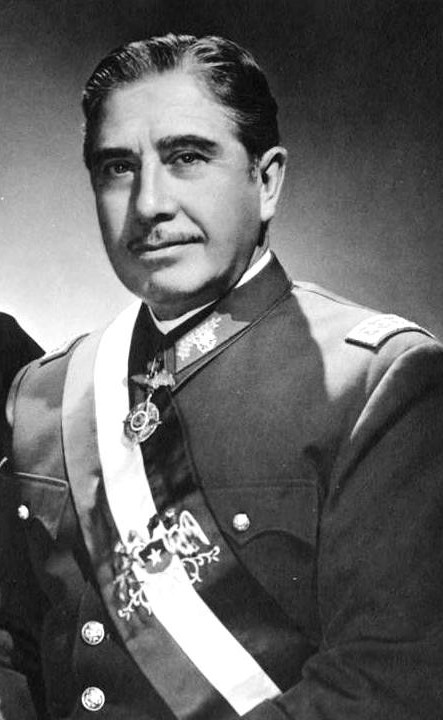
President Salvador Allende and coup leader Augusto Pinochet

The following events occurred in September 1973:

== September 1, 1973 (Saturday) ==
- In Denmark, 35 people were killed in an arson fire at the Hotel Hafnia in Copenhagen.
- World heavyweight boxing champion George Foreman of the U.S. defended his title for the first time since winning the title on January 22, taking on little-known Puerto Rican challenger José Roman in Tokyo. The bout was "one of the shortest heavyweight title fights in history", as Roman was knocked out two minutes into the first round.
- Provisional Irish Republican Army Chief of Staff Seamus Twomey was arrested by Irish police in Carrickmacross in Ireland's County Monaghan, south of the border with Northern Ireland. He would be convicted a month later on various charges, but freed from Mountjoy Prison in a raid by the Provisional IRA on October 31.
- Born: Ram Kapoor, Indian television actor known for the soap opera Kasamh Se; in New Delhi
- Died:
  - Graziella Pareto, 84, Spanish Catalan opera soprano
  - Arthur V. Watkins, 86, U.S. Senator who led the 1954 censure of his fellow Republican, U.S. Senator Joe McCarthy.

== September 2, 1973 (Sunday) ==
- The British Trades Union Congress (TUC) expelled 20 of its member unions (and their 370,650 individual members) for registering under the Industrial Relations Act 1971.
- The Netherlands men's team won the world field hockey championship, 4 to 2, over India, on penalty shots after Ties Kruize of the Netherlands had tied the game, 2–2 to force extra time, and the score remained the same after extra play. Surjit Singh Randhawa's two goals had given India a 2–0 lead in the first half.
- At Barcelona, bicyclist Felice Gimondi of Italy won the UCI World Championship after taking advantage of a battle between Belgian riders Freddy Maertens and Eddy Merckx, who had been competing for the lead in the final stage.
- Limerick defeated Kilkenny, 1–21 to 1–14 (24 to 17) to win the National Hurling League championship before a crowd of 59,009 at Dublin's Croke Park.

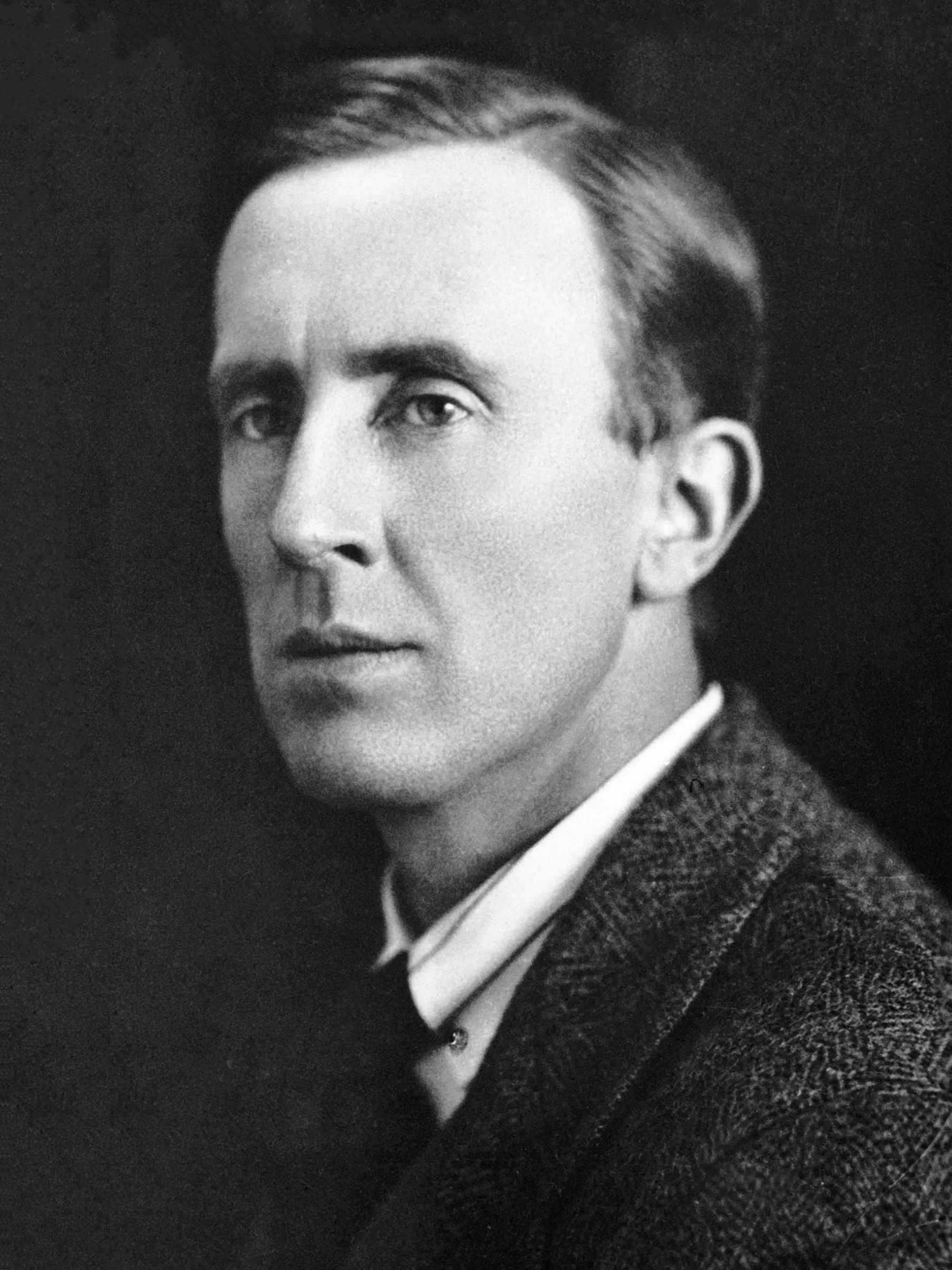
John Ronald Reuel Tolkien in 1925

- Died:
  - J. R. R. Tolkien, 81, South African-born British writer who wrote the bestselling fantasy novels The Hobbit and The Lord of the Rings, died of a perforated ulcer. A requiem mass was held four days later at the chapel of St Anthony of Padua, Oxford.
  - Shirali Muslimov, Soviet Azerbaijani shepherd who claimed to be 168 years old of having been born in 1805

== September 3, 1973 (Monday) ==
- The Argentine magazine La Causa Peronista published an interview with Esther Norma Arrostito and Mario Eduardo Firmenich, in which they described in detail the 1970 kidnapping and assassination of former President Pedro Eugenio Aramburu. After the overthrow of Isabel Perón in 1976, Arrostito would be captured by the Argentine Army and executed.
- During the Conference of American Armies in Caracas, General Breno Borges, head of the Brazilian army, proposed to "extend the exchange of information" between various right-wing generals in South America (in Bolivia, Brazil, Chile, Paraguay and Uruguay)in order to "struggle against subversion", with Operation Condor being launched two years later.
- Colonel Tom Parker, the longtime manager of Elvis Presley, quit after Presley's verbal criticism of the Hilton Hotels chain that was hosting the concert. Since 1956, Parker had been receiving more than one-half of Presley's earnings as compensation.
- Died: Rufino Santos, 65, Roman Catholic Archbishop of Manila and the first Cardinal from the Philippines

== September 4, 1973 (Tuesday) ==
- U.S. Patent No. 3,757,306 for the single-chip microprocessor, invented by Gary W. Boone, was granted to Texas Instruments, which had used it to successfully operate the first hand-held calculator.
- In the African colony of Portuguese Guinea (now the nation of Guinea-Bissau) guerrillas with the independence group PAIGC killed 22 Portuguese Army soldiers in an ambush. The PAIGC reported the attack, one of several that had killed 35 Portuguese troops in the first two weeks of September, on September 18.
- The world record for the Women's 4 × 100 metres medley relay in swimming was broken by the East German team of Ulrike Richter, Renate Vogel, Rosemarie Kother and Kornelia Ender.
- Died: James Shabazz, Black Muslim leader, was shot and killed by in the driveway of his home in Newark, New Jersey.

== September 5, 1973 (Wednesday) ==
- Agents of Italy's intelligence agency, (SIOS or Servizio Informazioni Operative e Situazione) and paramilitary police foiled a plot by five Arab terrorists who were planning to use a heat-seeking missile to shoot down an Israeli jetliner. Police had been tipped off that terrorists planned to fire the missile as a plane was approaching Rome's Fiumicino International Airport. A raid on a home at Ostia, four miles from Fiumicino, found two Soviet-made SA-7 missiles and a missile launcher in the possession of Mahmoud Azmikamy of Lebanon. A few hours later, four other terrorists (from Iraq, Syria, Algeria and Libya) were arrested at a Rome hotel.
- Tropical Storm Delia became the first tropical cyclone on record to make landfall in the same city twice, when it returned to Freeport, Texas in the U.S., two days after its first visit.
- A group of five Palestinian terrorists seized the Saudi Arabian Embassy in Paris and held 15 employees hostage, demanding the release of Abu Daoud, leader of the Black September Organization that had carried out the massacre of Israeli athletes at the 1972 Summer Olympics. The terrorists eventually flew to Saudi Arabia, surrendering in Riyadh and releasing their hostages in on September 8. The operation, planned by Abu Nidal, succeeded in persuading the Kingdom of Jordan to release Daoud from prison two weeks later.
- The asteroid 2014 RC passed within 0.01073 astronomical units or 997,890 miles (1,605,950 km) of Earth.
- Died: Lester Lane, 41, recently hired as head coach of the Oklahoma University basketball team, died of a heart attack shortly after playing a pickup game of basketball with other faculty members. Hired on August 6, he would have coached his first Sooners' game in December.

== September 6, 1973 (Thursday) ==
- The first underground subway in North Korea, the Chollima Line of the Pyongyang Metro, began operations.
- The Kenya Pipeline Company was incorporated as a state corporation under Kenya's Ministry of Energy, with 100% ownership by the Kenyan government.
- The landmark class action case of Rajender v. University of Minnesota was filed by assistant professor of chemistry Shyamala Rajender after she had been turned down for a tenure-track position despite being recommended by several university committees, and would ultimately issue in a ruling enjoining the university from sexual discrimination against women.
- Former United Mine Workers President Tony Boyle was arrested in Pittsburgh on murder charges for the December 31, 1969 slaying of rival Joseph A. Yablonski, along with Yablonski's wife and daughter.

== September 7, 1973 (Friday) ==
- The existence of Japan's military, the Japan Self-Defense Forces, was ruled as unconstitutional by a district court judge in Sapporo. Judge Shigeo Fukushima held that the creation of Japan's Army, Navy and Air Force had violated Article 9 of the 1947 Constitution of Japan, which declared that "Aspiring sincerely to an international peace based on justice and order, the Japanese people forever renounce war as a sovereign right of the nation... In order to accomplish the aim of the preceding paragraph, land, sea and air forces, as well as other war potential, will never be maintained." The government announced that it would appeal the ruling.
- Faina Melnik of the Soviet Union broke her own world record in the women's discus event at an athletics meeting in Edinburgh.

== September 8, 1973 (Saturday) ==
- The first edition of The Ocean Race began as 17 yachts (with 167 total crew participants) began a round-the-world trip from Portsmouth in the United Kingdom. Co-sponsored by the Royal Naval Sailing Association and the British hotel and restaurant company Whitbread, the event was originally called the "Whitbread Round the World Yacht Race" and would be won on April 9, 1974, by the yacht Sayula II, skippered by Ramón Carlín of Mexico.
- Australian tennis star Margaret Court won the U.S. Open for the fifth time, defeating fellow Australian Evonne Goolagong, 7–6, 5–7 and 6–2 to win her 24th major championship.
- Baseball's Hank Aaron hit his 709th home run, a record for homers in a single league and five short of the 714 hit by Babe Ruth. The technicality was that Ruth had 708 home runs in the American League, and six in the National League, while all of Aaron's runs had been in the NL.
- Four years after the cancellation of the original Star Trek series, the science fiction program returned as a 30-minute Saturday morning cartoon, also called Star Trek, and subtitled "Created by Gene Roddenberry". Produced by Filmation studios, the program featured the voices of seven of the original actors, (with the exception of Walter Koenig, who wrote one of the episodes but did not reprise his role as Ensign Chekhov), and brought back several of the original scriptwriters. The animated series won an Emmy Award, but was cancelled after two seasons, though it helped revive the Star Trek franchise for the actors to be reunited in the 1979 film.

== September 9, 1973 (Sunday) ==
- Jackie Stewart's fourth-place finish in the Italian Grand Prix gave him sufficient points to clinch the title of World Drivers' Champion in the Formula One season. With two races still left, and a maximum 18 points left to be won, Stewart had 69 points, far ahead of Emerson Fittipaldi (48), François Cevert (47) and race winner Ronnie Peterson (43).
- Australian tennis player John Newcombe won the U.S. Open men's singles in the fifth set after overcoming a 2 to 1 deficit against Jan Kodeš of Czechoslovakia. Newcombe's results were 6–4, 1–6, 4–6, 6–2 and, in the deciding set, 6–3.
- Died:
  - Everett O. Alldredge, 60, American archivist, died of cancer.
  - Giovanni Ricci, 69, Italian mathematician

== September 10, 1973 (Monday) ==
- Two days of voting concluded in Norway for the 155 seats of the unicameral parliament, the Storting. The Norske arbeiderpartei (Norwegian Labour Party) of former prime minister Trygve Bratteli lost 12 seats, but remained the largest party with 62 seats. Prime Minister Lars Korvald of the Kristelig Folkeparti (KFP or Christian Democrats) had formed a minority government in 1972 after Bratteli's government fell apart after Norwegian voters rejected the nation's entry into the European Economic Community.

San Marino

- The tiny (population 19,000) Republic of San Marino, which had denied women the right to vote until 1959, changed its laws to allow women to hold public office for the first time in Sammarinese history. The Grand and General Council voted to change the law effective October 1 by a 28 to 1 margin, with 18 members of the Communist and Democratic Socialist parties abstaining.
- The sinking of the Greek cargo ship Condor killed 10 of its crew after the vessel collided with the Portuguese ship H. Capelo in thick fog off Guernsey, Channel Islands. Only two of the crew survived.
- A Chilean military officer reported to an American CIA station officer that a coup d'état against the Allende government was being planned, and asked for U.S. government assistance in aiding the overthrow. The unidentified officer was told that the U.S. would not get involved because the coup "was strictly an internal Chilean matter," but that his request would be forwarded to Washington. The CIA thus learned of the exact date of the coup shortly before it took place. According to Reuters News Agency at the time, a White House source said that one of the officers from the planned military junta "had been in touch with official or unofficial American representatives" at least 48 hours before the coup and that the White House "had originally expected the coup on Monday," but the coup was postponed by the leaders until Tuesday. A U.S. State Department official said two days after the coup that the government had received a warning the night before the takeover but that the text was "not seen by responsible officials until after the coup had begun."
- Under an agreement between West Germany and East Germany, garbage trucks from West Berlin were allowed to haul rubbish "through a newly opened hole in the Berlin Wall" into East Germany in order to dump their contents into an abandoned quarry.

== September 11, 1973 (Tuesday) ==
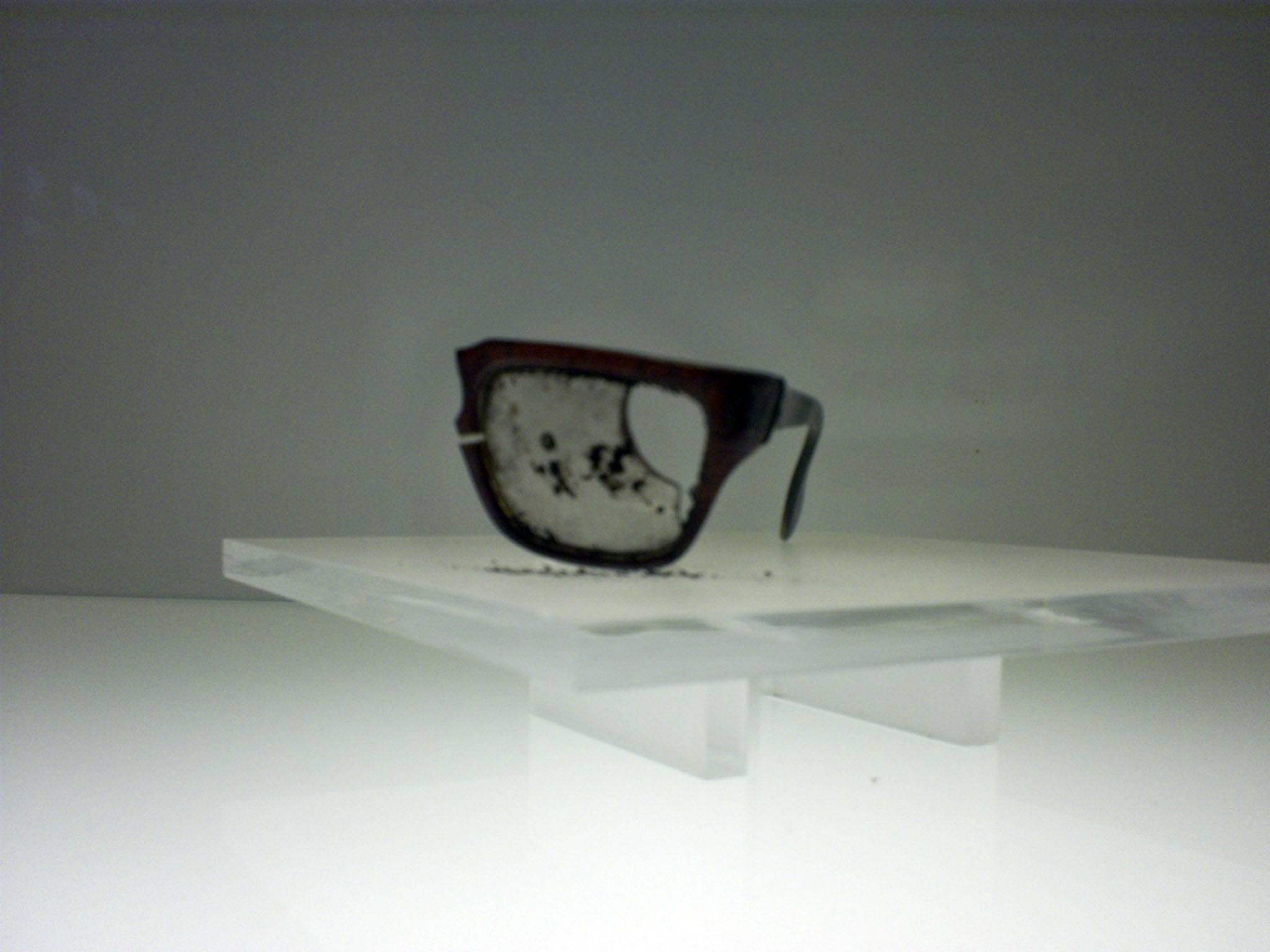
A fragment of Salvador Allende's eyeglasses, found after his death.

- Chile's democratically elected government was overthrown in a military coup after serious instability. President Salvador Allende made a farewell speech to Chileans on live radio broadcast by the station Radio Magallanes and then, according to reporter Juan Enrique Lira of the Santiago newspaper El Mercurio, shot himself. Lira reported that the press secretary, Agosto Olivares, had committed suicide as well. Chilean Army General Augusto Pinochet took over as chairman of a four-member military junta, along with Air Force General Gustavo Leigh, Admiral José Toribio Merino and General César Mendoza of the nation's national police force, the Carabineros de Chile. Pinochet would govern Chile for the next 16 years. Earlier in the day, the military chiefs of staff had informed Allende that they had taken control and called upon him to resign. Allende refused and for the next three hours, airplanes strafed and bombed the presidential residence, La Moneda, and tanks fired shells. In 2011, 22 years after the end of the Pinochet dictatorship and 38 years after Allende's death, a new inquiry would conclude that Allende's death had been a suicide rather than a murder and that an autopsy confirmed the account made by an eyewitness, Allende's personal physician, Dr. Patricio Guijon.
- All 41 passengers and crew aboard JAT Flight 769 were killed in Yugoslavia when the Sud Aviation Caravelle jetliner crashed into a mountain while making its approach to the city of Titograd in SR Montenegro (now Podgorica, Republic of Montenegro). The flight had originated in Skopje in SR Macedonia and an inexperienced air traffic controller had directed the jet to descend to an altitude of 6,000 feet (1,800 m).
- Police in South Africa fired into a crowd of striking gold miners in Carletonville, killing 12 black African workers and wounding 29 others.

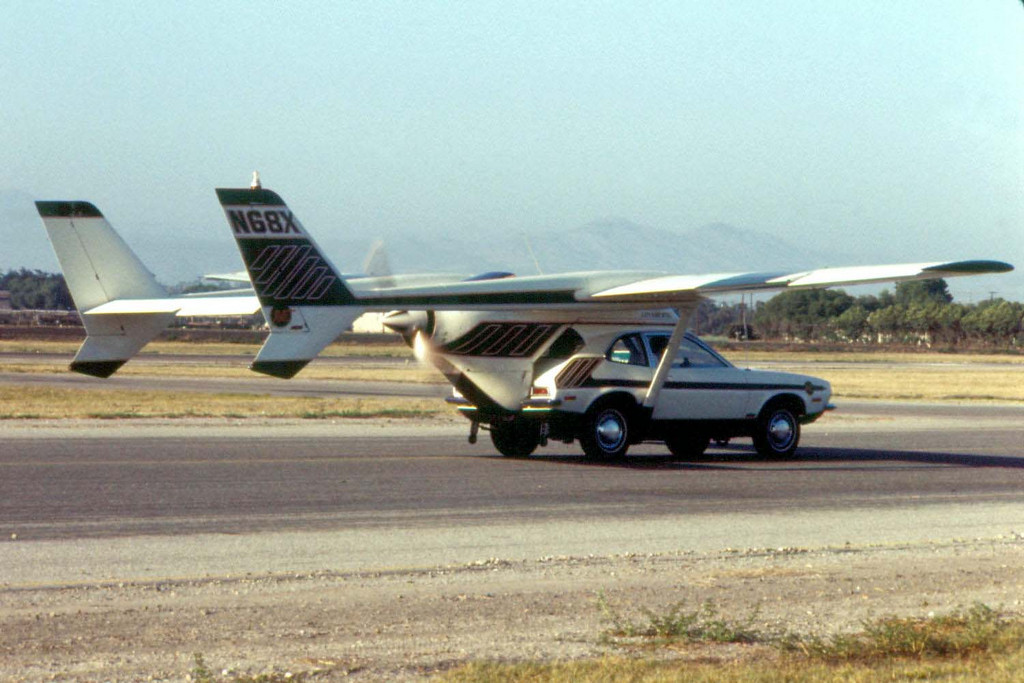
1973 AVE-Mizar

- In the first known fatality from a crash of a flying car, American aeronautical engineer Henry Smolinski was killed along with a passenger, Harold Black, shortly after taking off from the Ventura County Airport in Oxnard, California. Smolinski, president of Advanced Vehicle Engineers, was making a test flight of his AVE Mizar flying automobile, built from a Ford Pinto automobile and a Cessna Skymaster airplane and was at an altitude of 400 feet (120 m) when the Mizar fell apart.
- Egypt's President Anwar Sadat hosted a meeting with Syria's President Hafez al-Assad and Jordan's King Hussein at the Kubbeh Palace near Cairo, reportedly to discuss resumption of Jordan's diplomatic relations between the other two nations. The three nations would invade Israel 25 days later on October 6, starting the Yom Kippur War.

== September 12, 1973 (Wednesday) ==
- The British government announced that it had accepted a White Paper recommendation for construction of the Channel Tunnel at an estimated cost of £468 million ($1.17 billion), subject to approval by Parliament and equal spending by the government of France, with construction of two tunnels to begin within 18 months and trains to operate as early as 1980. The project would be halted on January 20, 1975, by the new Labour Party government, and construction would not begin until 1988.
- Turkey's governing national security council announced that national elections would take place on October 14, and that it would end 29 months of martial law in Istanbul and Ankara. On the same day, Turkey's new National Salvation Party (Millî Selâmet Partisi) launched its semi-official daily newspaper, Milli Gazete.
- Born Paul Walker, American film actor known for the Fast & Furious series of films; in Glendale, California (killed in accident, 2013).
- Died Marjorie Post, 86, American business leader and philanthropist who was, at one time, the wealthiest woman in the U.S. as owner of the General Foods Corporation

== September 13, 1973 (Thursday) ==
- In Israel, Menachem Begin and Ariel Sharon founded the political party Likud (Hebrew for "Consolidation"), an alliance of Begin's Herut party and Sharon's Liberal Party (which had formed a united front as the Gahal party) along with the Free Centre, the National List, and the Movement for Greater Israel. The Likud party would win the 1977 elections for the Knesset and Begin would become prime minister.
- The Israeli Air Force sent its 69 Squadron on a reconnaissance mission over northern Syria with F-4 Phantom jets, triggering the largest aerial battle in the Middle East since the 1967 Six-Day War. The Syrian Air Force engaged the invaders, and 13 of its MiG-21 jets were shot down, while the IAF lost a single Mirage III fighter. Most of the fighting took place over the Mediterranean Sea.
- A ban on television "blackouts" of professional football games— the prevention of the broadcast of a game in the television market where the game was being played— was passed by the U.S. House of Representatives, 336 to 37, three days before the 1973 NFL season began, following on a 76 to 6 vote in the U.S. Senate. Under the new law, which took effect upon President Nixon's signature the next day, local broadcasts of games could only be blacked out if the stadium was not sold out 72 hours before kickoff. The ban followed the blacking out of the Washington Redskins' home games during 1972, preventing most members of Congress from watching on TV.
- The first prototype of the Kortenbach & Rauh Kora 1 aircraft made its maiden flight.

== September 14, 1973 (Friday) ==
- The government of Laos agreed to allow the Communist group Pathet Lao to become part of a coalition government. The pact was signed in Vientiane between Prime Minister Souvanna Phouma and Pathet Lao representative Phoumi Vangvichit, nearly seven months after negotiations had begun following a Vientiane Treaty February 21 ceasefire in the ongoing civil war in the Southeast Asian kingdom.
- Ethiopia's Emperor Haile Selassie was held at gunpoint by his grandson, Prince Iskinder Desta, while the imperial Boeing 707 was returning to Addis Ababa after the Emperor's visit to West Germany. Desta, the deputy commander of the Ethiopian Navy, was assisted by a colleague who held the airplane's crew at bay while Desta demanded that Selassie abdicate the throne. After telling air traffic controllers in Italy and in Egypt that a hijack was in progress, the crew regained control of the airplane after Desta's mother, Selassie's daughter Princess Tenague, persuaded Desta to abandon the attempt.
- Governor of Georgia and future U.S. president Jimmy Carter was asked by the International UFO Bureau to file a report on his 1969 sighting of an unidentified flying object, and sent his statement on September 20.
- Died: Tommy Herron, 35, Northern Irish Protestant officer of the terrorist Ulster Defence Association, was shot and killed, apparently by a more extremist Protestant group, the Ulster Volunteer Force.

== September 15, 1973 (Saturday) ==
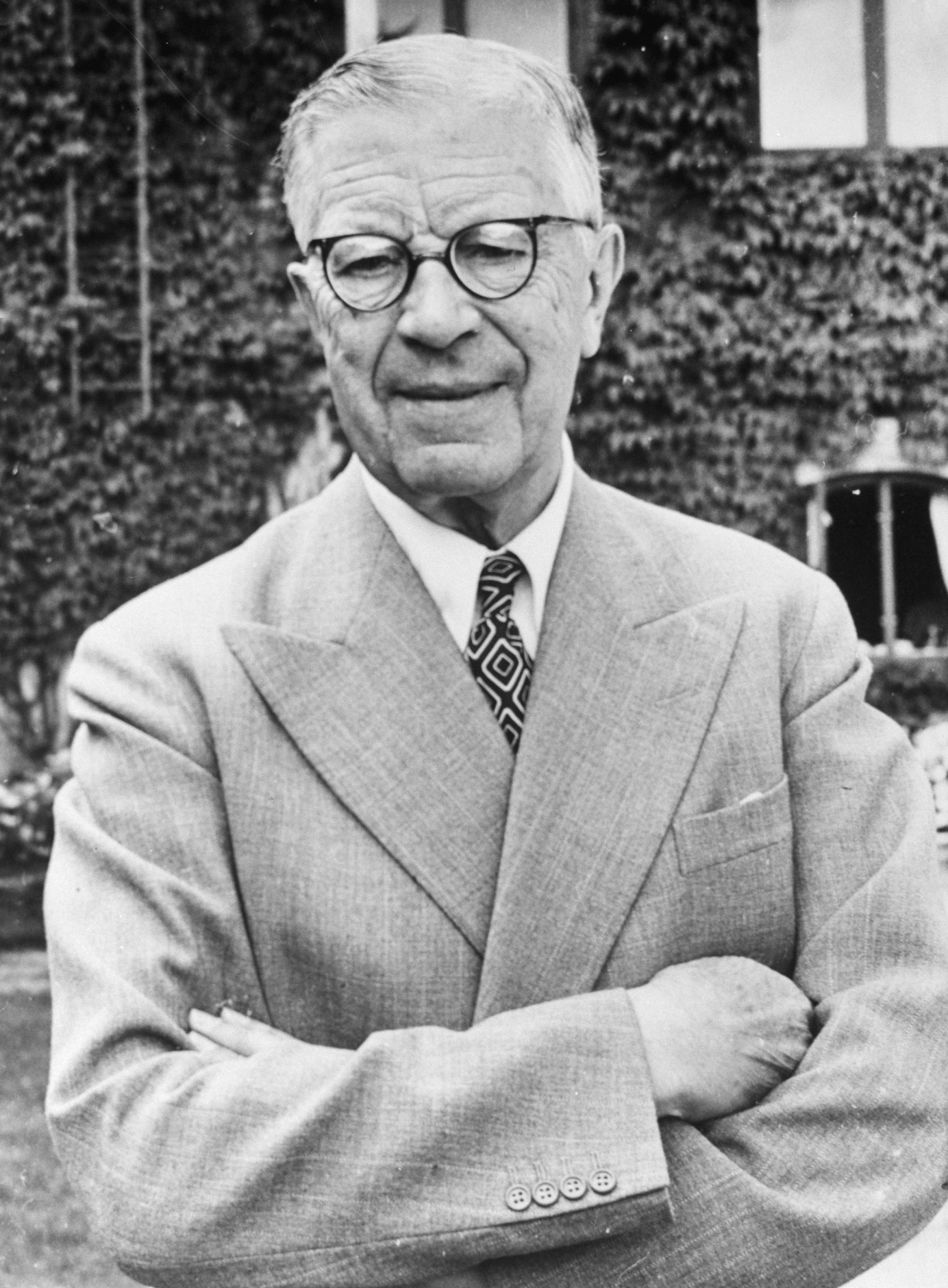
King Gustav VI Adolf, died September 15, 1973

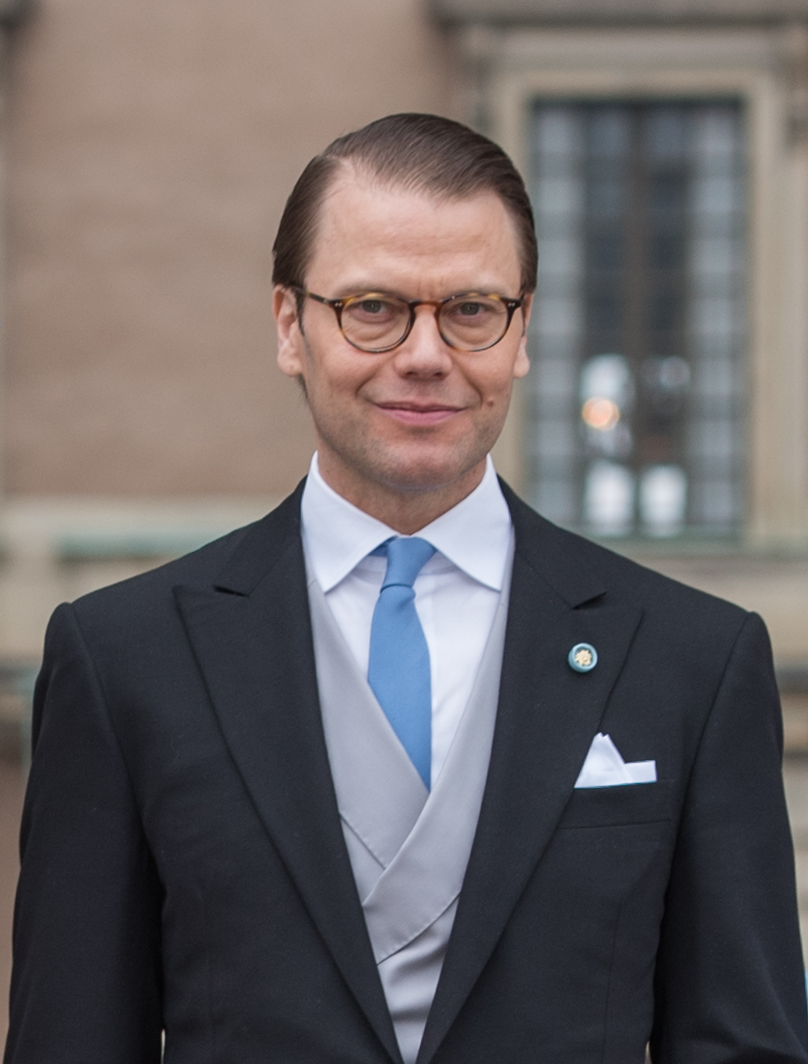
Prince Daniel, Duke of Västergötland, born September 15, 1973

- King Gustaf VI Adolf of Sweden died at the age of 90 after a reign of almost 23 years. He had been hospitalized for 26 days at a hospital in Helsingborg after the surgical removal of half of his stomach to halt bleeding from a complicated gastric ulcer. He was succeeded by his grandson, Prince Carl Gustaf, who took the regnal name of Carl XVI Gustaf. The King's death came on the day before elections for the Swedish parliament.
- Boris Blacher's opera Yvonne, Prinzessin von Burgund was performed for the first time, premiering in West Germany at the Opernhaus Wuppertal.
- Born: Prince Daniel, Duke of Västergötland, Swedish fitness entrepreneur, husband and prince consort of the future queen Victoria of Sweden; as Olof Daniel Westling, in Örebro

== September 16, 1973 (Sunday) ==
- In elections in Sweden for the 350-seat Riksdag, Prime Minister Olof Palme's Socialdemokraterna remained the largest party retaining 156 seats, 20 short of a majority. The Centerparteit of Thorbjörn Fälldin gained 19 seats to increase its share to 90. Afterwards, the non-socialist parties and the socialist parties each had 175 seats.
- Died:
  - Víctor Jara, 40, Chilean folk singer, was tortured and killed in the National Stadium in Santiago after being arrested by the nation's police force, the Carabineros. After the restoration of democracy to Chile in 1989, criminal charges would be filed against people who had participated in the killing. In 2018, eight retired Chilean military officers would be convicted and sentenced to 15 years imprisonment for Jara's murder.
  - Rafael Franco, 76, President of Paraguay for 18 months in 1936 and 1937;

== September 17, 1973 (Monday) ==
- Illinois became the first U.S. state to make Martin Luther King Jr.'s birthday a paid state holiday observed annually on January 15. Governor Dan Walker signed the bill after it passed the state house of representatives, 114 to 15, followed by the state senate.
- Mexico's Liga Comunista 23 de Septiembre terrorist organization attempted to kidnap Mexican philanthropist Eugenio Garza Sada, the founder and president of the Monterrey Institute of Technology and Higher Education. During a gun battle at an intersection in Monterrey, Garza, his driver and an assistant were killed along with two of the terrorists.
- Indonesia and South Korea officially established diplomatic relations.

== September 18, 1973 (Tuesday) ==
- The United Nations General Assembly voted unanimously to admit both the Federal Republic of Germany (West Germany) and the German Democratic Republic (East Germany) as the 133rd and 134th members of the United Nations. The newly-independent nation of the Bahamas was admitted as the 135th members. Horst Grunert became East Germany's first U.N. Ambassador, while Walter Gehlhoff was Ambassador for West Germany.
- King Hussein of Jordan issued a general amnesty for all Palestinian terrorists imprisoned in his Hashemite Kingdom, including Abu Daoud, leader of the Black September group that had carried out the massacre of Israeli athletes at the 1972 Olympic Games. Hussein's decree declared that it would cover "all convicts, detainees and wanted people within and outside the kingdom who had committed political crimes against state security, with the exception of murder and espionage." The next day, 300 prisoners were released, with a total of 754 guaranteed amnesty.
- In the West German suburb of Baden-Baden, an explosion of refrigerant ammonia at a slaughterhouse killed 12 employees and seriously injured nine others when the building collapsed on the butchers working inside.
- Died:
  - Péter Vályi, 53, Deputy Premier of Hungary since 1971, died three days after being fatally injured when he fell into a casting pit during a visit to the Lenin Metallurgical Works in Miskolc and was burned on molten ingots of iron.
  - Théo Lefèvre, 59, Prime Minister of Belgium from 1961 to 1965, died from cancer.

== September 19, 1973 (Wednesday) ==
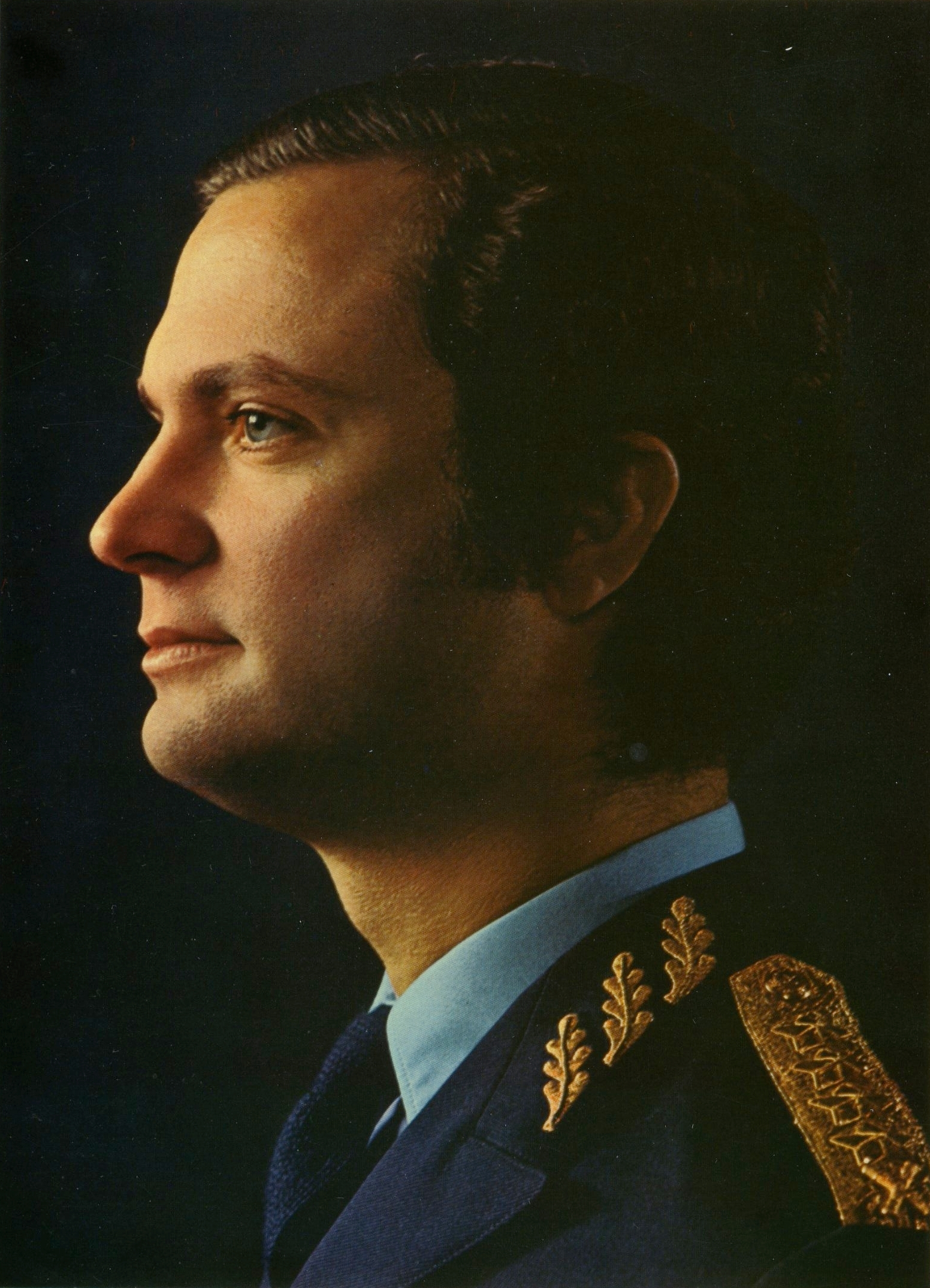
King Carl XVI Gustaf in 1973

- King Carl XVI Gustaf of Sweden was enthroned at the Hall of State of the Royal Palace of Stockholm. He chose the simple title Sveriges konung ("King of Sweden"), ending a 400-year tradition of Swedish monarchs using the title med Guds nåde Sveriges, Götes och Wendes konung ("By the Grace of God King of the Swedes, the Goths and the Vandals"). A lieutenant in the Swedish Navy, Carl Gustaf had been promoted to the rank of Admiral by the cabinet of prime minister Olof Palme prior to the ceremony. The last coronation of a Swedish monarch had been that of King Oscar II a century earlier, on May 12, 1873.
- Repatriation began between Pakistan and Bangladesh of prisoners of war who had been captured in fighting during the 1971 Bangladesh war of independence, with the United Nations chartering flights between Lahore and Dacca, and between Karachi and Chittagong. Within five days, 1,468 Bengalis and 1,308 Pakistanis had returned home.
- Died:
  - Charles Horman, 31, U.S. journalist who was arrested in Chile five days after the overthrow of the Allende government, was executed as one of many people interrogated, tortured and killed at Santiago's National Stadium. His story would be dramatized in the 1982 Costa-Gavras film Missing.
  - Gram Parsons, 26, U.S. singer-songwriter who was formerly a member of The Byrds, died from a combination of morphine and alcohol while at the Joshua Tree Inn near Yucca Valley, California. The day after his death, his manager and an assistant took the casket in a partially-successful attempt to carry out Parsons's wish to be cremated at the beach.

== September 20, 1973 (Thursday) ==
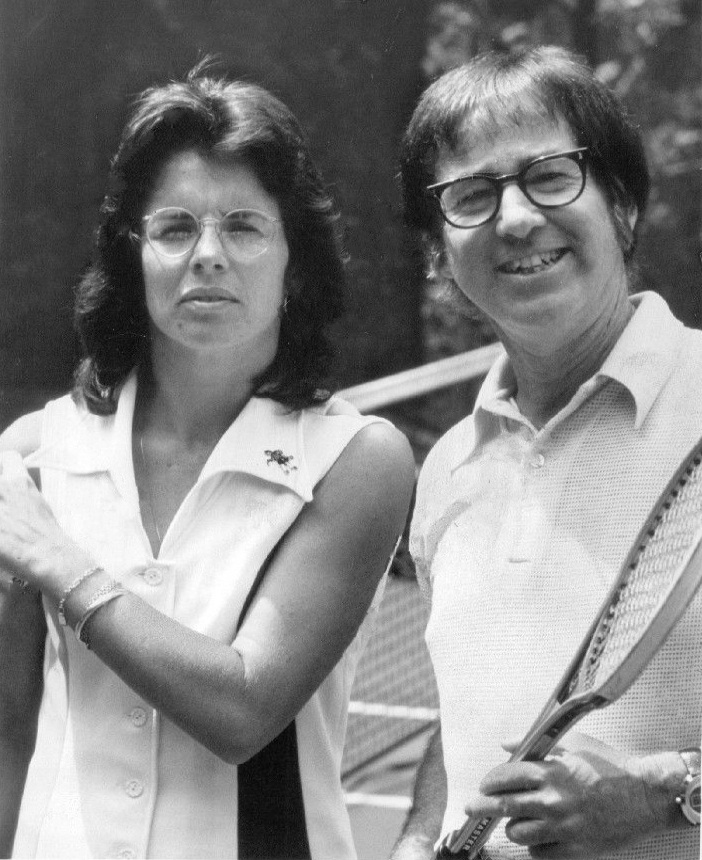
King and Riggs prior to the match

- In the most widely-watched tennis match up to that point, "The Battle of the Sexes" took place in the Houston Astrodome between 1973 women's Wimbledon champion Billie Jean King and 1939 men's champion Bobby Riggs. Riggs was favored to win by gambling oddsmakers as a 5-2 favorite. The event was televised in 36 countries and watched by an estimated at 90 million people at home, while a record 30,492 people attended in person. King won in three straight sets, 6–4, 6–4, 6–3.
- A Concorde supersonic jetliner landed in the United States for the first time, in conjunction for the dedication of the new Dallas Fort Worth International Airport.
- Former Afghanistan prime minister Mohammad Hashim Maiwandwal was arrested along with 20 other politicians and military officers on charges of plotting the overthrow of President Mohammad Daoud Khan. Maiwandwal committed suicide on October 1 while awaiting trial.
- Died: Jim Croce, 30, American rock singer, was killed in a plane crash along with songwriter Maury Muehleisen, 24, and four other people after he performed a concert at Northwestern State University's Prather Coliseum in Natchitoches, Louisiana. Killed also were the pilot, Robert N. Elliott, Croce's manager Dennis Rast, comedian George Stevens, and theater agent Dominick Cortese. The Beechcraft plane lost power as it took of at 10:45 at night, hit a tree, and then flipped over. The group was on its way to its next engagement at Sherman, Texas.
- Died: Glenn Strange, 74, American film and TV actor known for portraying Frankenstein's monster in three movies and in the recurring role of the bartender on the TV show Gunsmoke

== September 21, 1973 (Friday) ==
- The Six-Point Formula was agreed upon as a resolution to the difficulties between the Government of India and the Telangana region of the state of Andhra Pradesh. Andhra Pradesh, which had been created in 1956 from a merger of the Andhra state and the Telangana region of the Hyderabad state, would be split back up in 2014, with Telangana becoming the 28th and newest state of India.
- Henry Kissinger was confirmed by the U.S. Senate as the new Secretary of State, by a vote of 78 to 7.
- The Ford Motor Company introduced the Mustang II, a more fuel-efficient model of its popular sports car. The 1974 Mustang was 490 pounds (220 kg) lighter and 19 inches (480 mm) shorter than the 1973 Mustang.
- Two survivors of a capsized boat were rescued after having been adrift in the Pacific Ocean for more than ten weeks. James Fisher and a couple, Robert and Linda Tininenko, had been at sea since July 2, sailing from the U.S. state of Washington to Marina del Rey, California, when their trimaran double-outrigger, the Triton, overturned on July 11. A British freighter, SS Benalder, spotted the boat 900 miles (1,400 km) from the California coast and rescued the two men. Mrs. Tininenko had died on August 11 but her body was not on the Triton. Fisher, 30, died from an infection and kidney failure 11 days after his rescue.

== September 22, 1973 (Saturday) ==
- Egypt's President Anwar Sadat and Syria's President Hafez al-Assad met in Damascus and ordered the military commanders to prepare for a launch date of October 6, coinciding with the Jewish holy day of Yom Kippur for a surprise attack on Israel.
- Jordan's King Hussein and Israel's Prime Minister Golda Meir met secretly at an undisclosed location in Israel, along with intelligence directors of both nations, to discuss peace negotiations.
- The controversial second amendment to the constitution of Bangladesh was passed by the majority Awami League party to provide President Mujibur Rahman with legal authority for "preventive detention" of anyone for up to six months without trial if suspected of "endangering public safety", as well as authorizing the president to proclaim a state of emergency. Civil rights in the South Asian nation of 70 million people would continue to deteriorate in the years that followed.
- The new Dallas—Fort Worth International Airport was dedicated. Sitting primarily on land at Grapevine, Texas (in Tarrant County) and Irving, Texas (in Dallas County) and occupying 17,207 acres (6,963 ha) or almost 27 square miles, it was the largest airport in the U.S. in terms of area at the time.
- Henry Kissinger, the National Security Advisor to U.S. President Nixon, was sworn in as the U.S. Secretary of State. Kissinger, a native of Germany, was the first foreign-born person to hold the position and the first Jewish person to head the U.S. State Department.
- Died: Frank Teruggi, 23, American college student studying in Chile, was shot 17 times and his body was dropped off at a morgue in Santiago. His death came two days after he had been arrested by the nation's Carabineros de Chile police force. Teruggi's body was identified 12 days later, from fingerprints and dental records, by an official of the U.S. consulate.

== September 23, 1973 (Sunday) ==
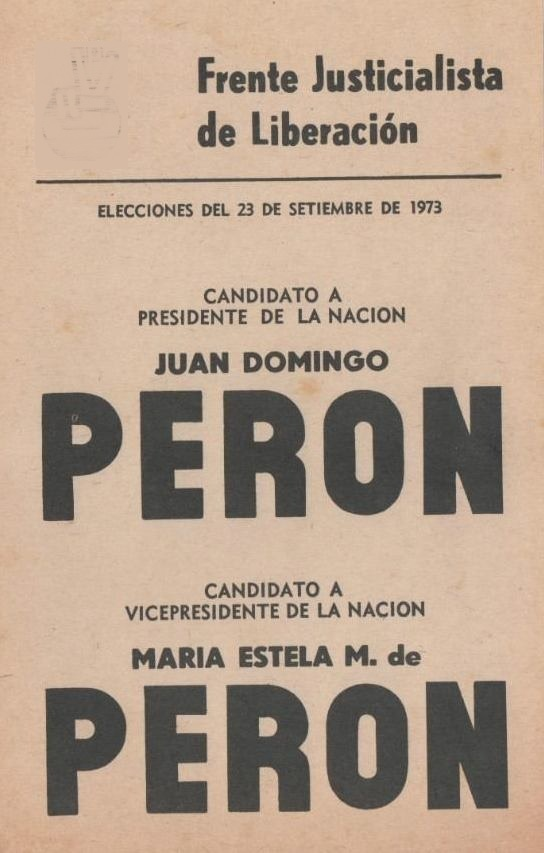
Election poster for Peron and Peron

- Voters in Argentina's presidential election, the second of the year, overwhelmingly endorsed the return to power of former president Juan Perón, who had been overthrown in 1955, with his wife Isabel Perón as vice president. Running on the ticket of the Frente Justicialista de Liberacion (FREJULI), the Peróns received 7,359,252 of the 12,055,638 that had been cast, or 61.04%. The runner up candidate, Ricardo Balbín of the Union Civica Radical (UCR), received only 2,905,719 or 24.10%.
- Despite a recent lower-court decision holding that the existence of Japan's military was a violation of the nation's constitution, Japan's House of Councillors voted, 128 to 99, to approve two bills to increase the size of Japan's armed forces to 270,000 servicemen, endorsing a measure that had already been approved by Japan's House of Representatives.
- Died: Pablo Neruda, 69, Chile's national poet, winner of the 1971 Nobel Prize in Literature, as well as a former Communist who had been Salvador Allende's Ambassador to France, died of prostate cancer shortly after being released home from a hospital. Although Neruda feared that he had received an injection of poison after the September 11 coup d'etat, which took place while he had been hospitalized, an investigation of his remains decades later would find no traces of poisoning.

== September 24, 1973 (Monday) ==
Guinea-Bissau

- At the city of Madina do Boe, in portions of the colony of Portuguese Guinea controlled by nationalists of the African Party for the Independence of Guinea and Cape Verde (PAIGC), Luís Cabral declared the independence of the Republic of Guinea-Bissau from Portugal. The independence declaration, made at a National Assembly of PAIGC members who had been voted on in rebel territory the year before, was the first to be made in any of Portugal's African territories. After the overthrow of the Portuguese government in 1974, the new regime in Lisbon would acknowledge independence on September 10, 1974, and yield the capital at Bissau to Cabral on July 5, 1975.

== September 25, 1973 (Tuesday) ==
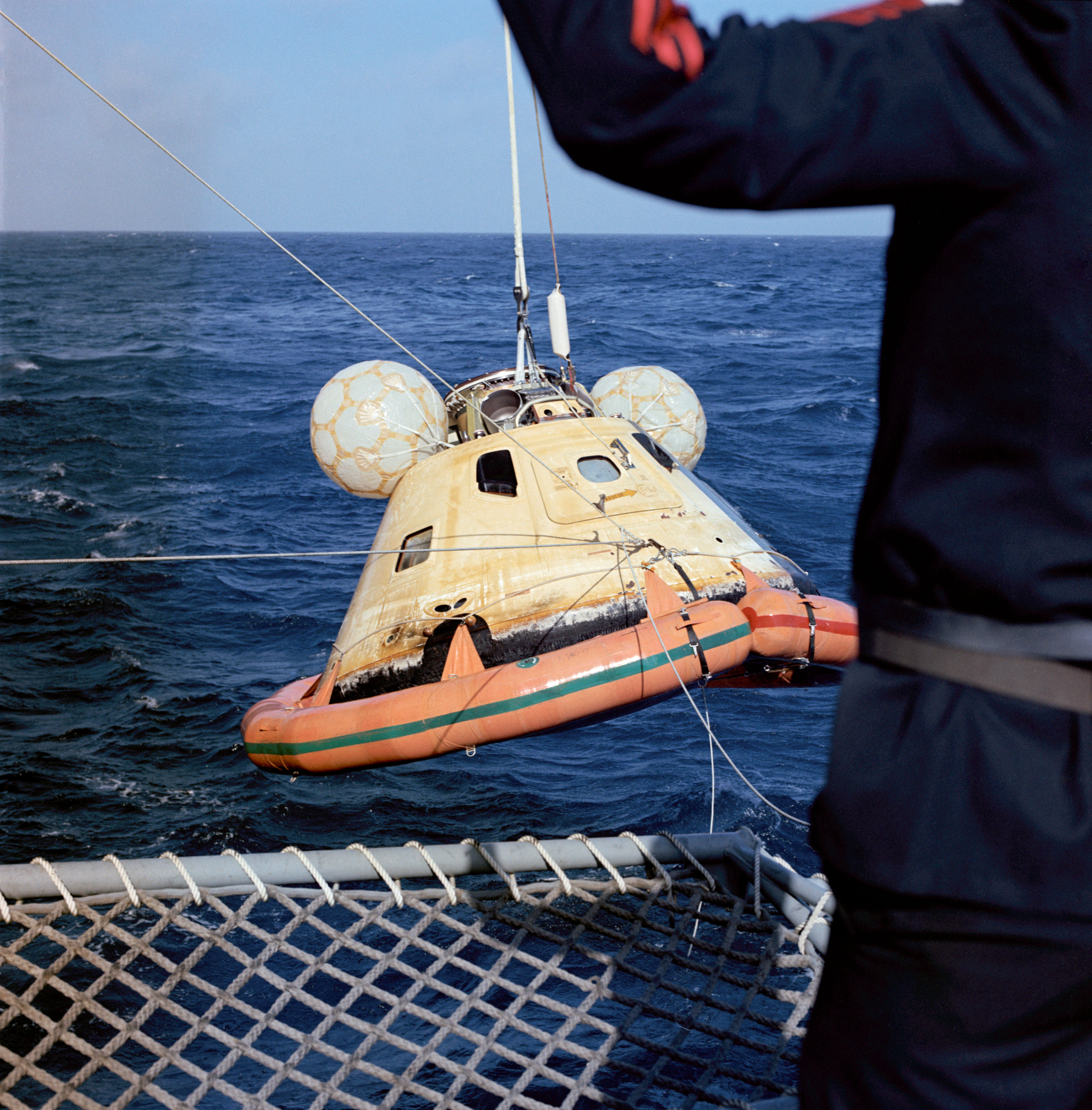
The floating Skylab 3 module

- The Skylab 3 mission to the American space station Skylab returned to Earth safely with astronauts Alan Bean, Owen Garriott, and Jack Lousma after having spent an unprecedented 59 days in space. Splashdown in the Pacific ocean, 230 miles (370 km) from the U.S., took place at 3:19 in the afternoon local time (2219 UTC), and the capsule was recovered by the U.S. Navy ship New Orleans. The capsule had toppled over after landing in rough seas, but was saved by the crew's deployment of inflatable rafting.
- Under investigation by a federal grand jury on accusations of bribery, U.S. Vice President Spiro Agnew handed a letter to Carl Albert, Speaker of the U.S. House of Representatives, asking that the House make an impeachment inquiry on the charges "in the dual interest of preserving the constitutional stature of my office and accomplishing my personal vindication." The next day, Albert declined to take the investigation away from the U.S. Department of Justice, and Agnew would resign two weeks later, on October 10.
- Six main-belt asteroids 4303 Savitskij, 6682 Makarij, 3157 Novikov, 6162 Prokhorov, 5412 Rou and 8982 Oreshek were discovered by astronomer L. V. Zhuravleva at the Crimean Astrophysical Observatory on the same day.
- Died: José Ignacio Rucci, 49, Argentine labor union leader who was general secretary of the Confederación General del Trabajo and an associate of President-elect Juan Perón, was ambushed at his home in the Flores neighborhood of Buenos Aires. Rucci was shot 23 times by the Montoneros terrorist group.

== September 26, 1973 (Wednesday) ==
- The Rehabilitation Act of 1973 was signed into law by U.S. president Nixon, after passing the House 400 to 0 on September 13 and by the Senate 88 to 0 on September 18.
- American serial killer Bernard Giles began a string of five murders committed in a period of less than eight weeks, all of them young girls and women who were hitchhiking along roads in Brevard County, Florida. Two more potential victims fought back against him on December 10 and were able to provide information to the police sufficient for Giles's arrest the next day.
- Died:
  - Ralph Earnhardt, 45, a NASCAR racing driver in the U.S., died of a heart attack. The patriarch of the Earnhardt racing family, he was at his home in Kannapolis, North Carolina, working on a carburetor in his kitchen, when he collapsed.
  - Anna Magnani, 65, Oscar-winning Italian film actress, died of pancreatic cancer.

== September 27, 1973 (Thursday) ==
- Soyuz 12, the first Soviet crewed space flight in more than two years, was launched in order to test new pressure suits and the redesigned Soyuz capsule, the 7K-T. With revisions to have Soviet launches crewed by two people instead of three, cosmonauts Vasily Lazarev and Oleg Makarov were launched at 6:18 p.m. local time (1218 UTC) from the Baikonur Cosmodrome and spent two days in orbit, landing on September 29. The flight was the first for cosmonauts since the Soyuz 11 tragedy that killed all three crew on June 29, 1971.
- All 11 people aboard Texas International Airlines Flight 655 were killed in the U.S. state of Arkansas when the turbojet plane crashed during part of its multistop travel from Memphis to Dallas. The Convair 600 took off from El Dorado, Arkansas on a 22-minute flight to Texarkana. After the pilot ordered the first officer to descend to 2,000 feet (610 m) and the officer consulted a chart, discovering that the airplane was too low. The last words on the cockpit voice recording were the first officer telling the pilot ""Minimum en route altitude here is forty-four hun..." At that moment, the airplane crashed into the side of the 2,600 feet (790 m) high Black Fork Mountain, near Mena, Arkansas. Three more people were killed during the four-day search for the missing airliner when their helicopter crashed. The wreckage was finally located on September 30, 85 miles (137 km) off course from its intended destination of Texarkana.
- The popular syndicated TV show Don Kirshner's Rock Concert made its debut with The Rolling Stones and The Doobie Brothers as its first featured acts. At 90 minutes, the program would run for 230 episodes until 1981.
- A firing squad in Chile carried out the first execution of a high-ranking ally of the late president Salvador Allende, shooting German Castro Rojas, the deposed Governor of Talca Province after convicting him in a court-martial on charges of killing a Carabinero policeman and attempting to destroy a dam.

== September 28, 1973 (Friday) ==
- The ITT Corporation headquarters in New York City was bombed by Weather Underground terrorists in protest against ITT's alleged involvement in the overthrow of Chile's president Allende. Nobody was injured by the bomb, which exploded at 2:19 in the morning after the group had telephoned a warning to The New York Times three hours earlier. However, four rooms on the 9th floor, in the Latin-American section of the ITT-Americas skyscraper, were demolished.
- The most popular film in India up to that time, Bobby, a Hindi language musical produced and directed by Raj Kapoor and starring Rishi Kapoor and Dimple Kapadia, was released by R. K. Films. It would become the first Indian film with box office sales of more than 100 million rupees.
- French master criminal Jacques Mesrine was recaptured, four months after he had taken a judge hostage and escaped a courtroom. Mesrine would stay behind bars again for almost five years, writing a bestselling autobiography while incarcerated, before escaping again in 1978.
- Five of the 11 crew of the Netherlands cargo ship Leliegracht were killed when the ship sank in the North Sea off of IJmuiden.
- The Palestinian terrorist group As-Sa'iqa seized a train carrying 37 Soviet Jewish emigrants to Schönau Castle in Austria, and took four of them hostage, demanding that the center be closed. Austrian chancellor Bruno Kreisky gave in to the group's demands the next day and the hostages were freed, but the incident diverted Israeli attention from the monitoring of a military buildup in Egypt and Israel, a week before the beginning of the Yom Kippur War. The camp was closed on December 10 and replaced by a temporary Red Cross station at Wollersdorf.
- In the wake of the recent closures of gas stations by protesting owners, the U.S. Cost of Living Council announced that it would approve allowing stations to increase their prices by as much as 2½ cents per gallon, as an exception to the "Phase IV" price freeze imposed by President Nixon the previous month.

== September 29, 1973 (Saturday) ==
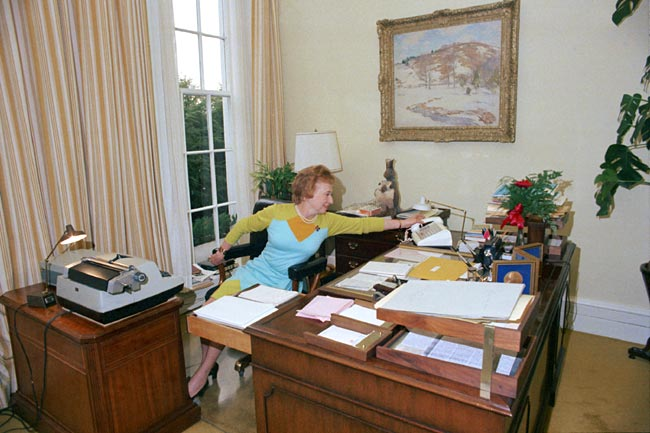
Woods re-enacting the "accidental" erasure of evidence

- Rose Mary Woods, the personal secretary to U.S. President Richard Nixon, transcribed one of the secret White House recordings that had been made of a June 20, 1972, conversation between the President and Chief of Staff H. R. Haldeman. Afterward, she found that 18 minutes and 30 seconds of the recording, which had been made shortly after the Watergate break-in, had been erased. Speculation followed about whether the "18-minute gap" had been deliberately created, with questions about whether the conversation had been about covering up an investigation of the burglary. Woods claimed that she had mistakenly hit the record button rather than the playback button on the Uher 5000 machine, and then held her foot on the pedal controls for five minutes while answering a telephone.
- The championship of Australian rules football was won by the Richmond Tigers, with a 116 to 86 victory (16.20 to 12.14 based on 16 six-point goals and 20 points) over the Carlton Blues, as the Victoria Football League championship was played in Melbourne.
- On the second-to-last game of the Atlanta Braves' 1973 season, Hank Aaron hit his 713th career home run, one less than the 714 hit during Babe Ruth's career. The homer was the 40th of the season for the 39-year-old Aaron. Aaron had 3 hits in 4 at-bats in the last game, a 5-3 loss to Houston, but no homers, and the breaking of the record would not take place until the start of the 1974 season.
- Died: W. H. Auden, 66, English poet

== September 30, 1973 (Sunday) ==
- All 108 passengers and crew aboard Aeroflot Flight 3932 were killed in a crash in the Soviet Union when the Tupolev Tu-104 jet went down shortly after taking off from Sverdlovsk in the Russian SFSR (now Yekaterinburg) at the start of a multi-stop flight with a final scheduled destination of Vladivostok.
- The "Caravan of Death" ("Caravana de la Muerte"), a unit of the Chilean Army commanded by Brigadier General Sergio Arellano and assigned to execute enemies of the new regime outside of Santiago, began a 23-day tour of the nation by helicopter and brutally killed at least 97 people. In its first phase, from September 30 to October 6, General Arellano's Caravan killed 26 people between Rancagua and Puerto Montt. After a 10-day respite, the group flew to cities in northern Chile and killed 71 more.
- Yankee Stadium, known as "The House That Ruth Built", was closed for a two-year renovation at a cost of $160 million. The New York Yankees would play all of their home games at Shea Stadium in 1974 and 1975.
- The title from the 1973 President's Cup Football Tournament was shared by Burma and Khmer after the final ended in a goal-less draw.
