= Jean Mouroux =

French Catholic theologian

- Born: 16 March 1901; Dijon, France
- Died: October 14, 1973 (aged 72); Dijon, France
- Occupation: Diocesan Rector
- Theological work
- Tradition or movement: Nouvelle Théologie
- Main interests: Personalism

Jean Mouroux (1901-1973) was a French Catholic theologian. His unique Personalistic perspective has exercised a notable influence in the theology of the second half of the 20th century, especially in the realm of Christian faith and experience.

== Life ==
Jean Mouroux was born in Dijon, France, on 16 March 1901, and died in the same city on 14 October 1973. He spent the majority of his life in the diocesan seminary of Dijon, of which he was the Rector from 1947 to 1956. A serious heart condition impaired his ability to live a normal life after 1956, forcing him to step down from the position.

Mouroux was a member of a group of European theologians (most of whom were from France, Belgium, and Germany) that played an important part in the renewal of Catholic theology following the Second Vatican Council. They sought to create a dialogue between different groups in topics such as faith and culture, the church and modern society, and Christianity and Humanism, with the objective of finding a way to present the Christian message in an open and lively format that would better resonate with the needs of contemporary society.

Although he didn't subscribe to any particular theological movement or school of thought, and his personal circumstances—such as his position within the church and his health —made it difficult for him to participate in many activities, Mouroux eagerly participated in the activities and interests of the theological circles of his time: he corresponded with the most important schools of theology of the time —Lyon, Fourvière, and Le Saulchoir—and became friends with many of the 20th-century theologians belonging to the school of thought known as the Nouvelle Théologie, including Henri de Lubac, Jean Daniélou, Marie-Dominique Chenu, and others.

Pope Paul VI appointed him as a member of the final session of the Second Vatican Council.

Following his death in Dijon in 1973, a fund was created to gather any biographic or bibliographic materials related to Mouroux and his theological work. The Fonds Jean Mouroux is situated in the Chanoine Bardy Diocesan Library in Dijon.

== Theology ==
The theology of Mouroux reflects on the experience of a person's encounter with God in faith, from a Personalistic perspective. In Mouroux's perspective, God's call to humanity through Jesus Christ is what defines the purpose of human existence, and every individual person has an obligation to respond to that call in their life.

Mouroux made contributions to four of the major themes of Christian theology: the human individual, faith, Christian experience, and the mystery of time.

== Works ==
Mouroux wrote eight books in his lifetime, and upwards of seventy articles and collaborative works.

=== Books ===
- Sens chrétien de l’hômme, 1945.
- Je crois en Toi, 1949.
- L’expérience chrétienne, 1952.
- Du baptême à l’acte de foi, 1953.
- Le Mystère du Temps. Approche théologique, 1962.
- La liberté chrétienne, 1966.
- À travers le monde de la foi, 1968.
- Faites ceci en mémoire de moi, 1970.
