= Angkhana Phanprateep =

Thai voice actress

- อังคณา พานประทีป
- Born: Angkhana Na Thalang (อังคณา ณ ถลาง); 21 October 1973 (age 52); Bangkok, Thailand
- Occupations: Voice actress, singer
- Years active: 1990–present

Angkhana Phanprateep (Thai: อังคณา พานประทีป; RTGS: Angkhana Phanprathip, born on 21 October 1973) is a Thai voice actress, ADR director, singer and former child actress.

== Career ==
She started her career in 1980s as a child actress. She appeared in the children's television show Sa Mo Sorn Pueng Noi (สโมสรผึ้งน้อย). She first started voice acting in 1990 by voicing Ped Noi (เป็ดน้อย, Little Duck Girl) from the Thai children's show Chao Khun Thong, which aired on Channel 7 in the 1990s. She began full-time freelance voice acting work in 1999. Angkhana's major voice roles include Giselle in Enchanted, Mikaela Banes in Transformers: Revenge of the Fallen and Laa-Laa in Teletubbies. She has also worked as an ADR director in Maleficent: Mistress of Evil.

== Filmography ==
=== Voice roles ===
==== Anime ====
- Air Gear – Simca
- Ballad of a Shinigami – Momo
- Black Butler – Ciel Phantomhive
- Bleach – Lirin, Yuzu Kurosaki, Retsu Unohana, Kūkaku Shiba
- Buso Renkin – Tokiko Tsumura
- Canaan – Alphard Alshua, Liang Qi
- Capeta – Monami
- D.Gray-man – Lenalee Lee
- Dinosaur King – Rex Owen
- Galaxy Angel II – Anise Azeat, Natsume Izayoi
- Genesis of Aquarion – Reika
- Gintama: The Movie – Kagura
- Hayate the Combat Butler – Hinagiku Katsura, Isumi Saginomiya, Ayumu Nishizawa
- Honey and Clover – Ayumi Yamada
- Idaten Jump – Makoto Shido
- Kamichama Karin – Kazune Kujyou
- Kekkaishi – Princess, Shigemori Sumimura
- Kotetsushin Jeeg – Tsubaki Tamashiro
- MÄR – Dorothy
- Mirmo! – Murumo, Azumi Hidaka
- Sgt. Frog – Momoka Nishizawa
- Shugo Chara! – Amu Hinamori
- Soul Eater – Maka Albarn
- Reborn! – I-Pin, Bianchi
- S · A: Special A – Hikari Hanazono
- Samurai 7 – Komachi, Yukino
- Shakugan no Shana Second – Shana
- Yu-Gi-Oh! GX – Rei Saotome

==== Western animation ====
- Chao Khun Thong – Ped Noi
- Teletubbies – Laa-Laa
- Ben 10: Alien Force – Ben Tennyson
- Ben 10: Ultimate Alien – Ben Tennyson
- George of the Jungle – Ursula Scott
- Stitch! – Yuna
- Phineas and Ferb – Candace Flynn

==== Film ====
- Barbie: A Fashion Fairy Tale – Barbie
- Barbie: A Fairy Secret – Barbie
- Barbie in a Mermaid Tale – Merliah Summers
- Barbie: Princess Charm School – Blair Willows
- Casper's Scare School – Casper
- Astro Boy – Toby Tenma/Astro
- 2012 – Kate Curtis (Amanda Peet)
- Aliens in the Attic – Art Pearson (Henri Young), Bethany Pearson (Ashley Tisdale)
- Avatar – Trudy Chacón (Michelle Rodriguez)
- Battle: Los Angeles – Elena Santos (Michelle Rodriguez)
- Enchanted – Giselle (Amy Adams)
- G.I. Joe: The Rise of Cobra – Ana Lewis/Anastascia DeCobray (Sienna Miller)
- Inception – Ariadne (Elliot Page)
- Jennifer's Body – Jennifer Check (Megan Fox)
- Marley & Me – Jenny Grogan (Jennifer Aniston)
- Ninja Assassin – Kiriko (Kylie Goldstein)
- Saw VI – Simone (Tanedra Howard)
- The Sorcerer's Apprentice – Veronica (Monica Bellucci)
- Thor – Jane Foster (Natalie Portman)
- Tooth Fairy – Carly (Ashley Judd), Randy (Chase Ellison)
- Transformers: Revenge of the Fallen – Mikaela Banes (Megan Fox)
- Watchmen – Silk Spectre (Malin Åkerman)
