= Six-Point Formula of 1973 (Telangana) =

Positive discrimination policy for Telangana in Andhra Pradesh

The Six-Point Formula was a positive discrimination policy of the government of India for the Telangana region (now a separate state of India) of Andhra Pradesh, reached as a political settlement on 21 September 1973. Andhra Pradesh had till then been under president's rule due the resignation of chief minister P. V. Narasimha Rao after the flaring up of the 1972 Jai Andhra movement.

To avoid legal problems, the constitution was amended (32nd amendment) to give legal sanctity to the Six-Point formula.

== Six points ==
1. Accelerated development of the backward areas of the State, and planned development of the State capital, with specific resources earmarked for these purposes; and appropriate representation of such backward areas in the State legislature, along with other experts, should formulate and monitor development schemes for the areas. The formation at the State level of a Planning Board as well as Sub-Committees for different backward areas should be the appropriate instrument for achieving this objective.
2. Institution of uniform arrangements throughout the State enabling adequate preference being given to local candidates in the matter of admission to educational institutions, and establishment of a new Central University at Hyderabad to augment the existing educational facilities should be the basis of the educational policy of the State.
3. Subject to the requirements of the State as a whole, local candidates should be given preference to specified extent in the matter of direct recruitment to (i) non-gazetted posts (other than in the Secretariat. Offices of Heads of Department, other State level offices and institutions and the Hyderabad City Police) (ii) corresponding posts under the local bodies and (iii) the posts of Tahsildars, Junior Engineers and Civil Assistant Surgeons. To improve their promotion prospects, service cadres should be organised to the extent possible on appropriate local basis up to specified gazetted level, first or second, as may be administratively convenient.
4. A high-power administrative tribunal should be constituted to deal with the grievances of services regarding appointments, seniority, promotion and other allied matters. The decisions of the Tribunal should ordinarily be binding on the State Government. The constitution of such a tribunal would justify limits on recourse to judiciary in such matters.
5. In order that implementation of measures based on the above principles does not give rise to litigation and consequent uncertainty, the Constitution should be suitably amended to the extent necessary conferring on the President enabling powers in this behalf.
6. The above approach would render the continuance of Mulki Rules and Regional Committee unnecessary.

== Violation ==
In 1985, when Telangana employees complained about violations of the six-point formula, the government enacted government order 610 (GO 610) to correct the violations in recruitment. As Telangana people complained about non-implementation of GO 610, in 2001, the government constituted the Girglani commission to look into violations.
