= Denjoy theorem =

In mathematics, Denjoy's theorem may refer to several theorems proved by Arnaud Denjoy, including

- Denjoy–Carleman theorem
- Denjoy–Koksma inequality
- Denjoy–Luzin theorem
- Denjoy–Luzin–Saks theorem
- Denjoy–Riesz theorem
- Denjoy–Wolff theorem
- Denjoy–Young–Saks theorem
- Denjoy's theorem on rotation number
