= Denjoy integral =

The Denjoy integral in mathematics can refer to two closely related integrals connected to the work of Arnaud Denjoy:

- the narrow Denjoy integral, or just Denjoy integral, also known as Henstock–Kurzweil integral,
- the (more general) wide Denjoy integral, or Khinchin integral.
