= Hans Hahn (mathematician) =

Austrian mathematician (1879–1934)

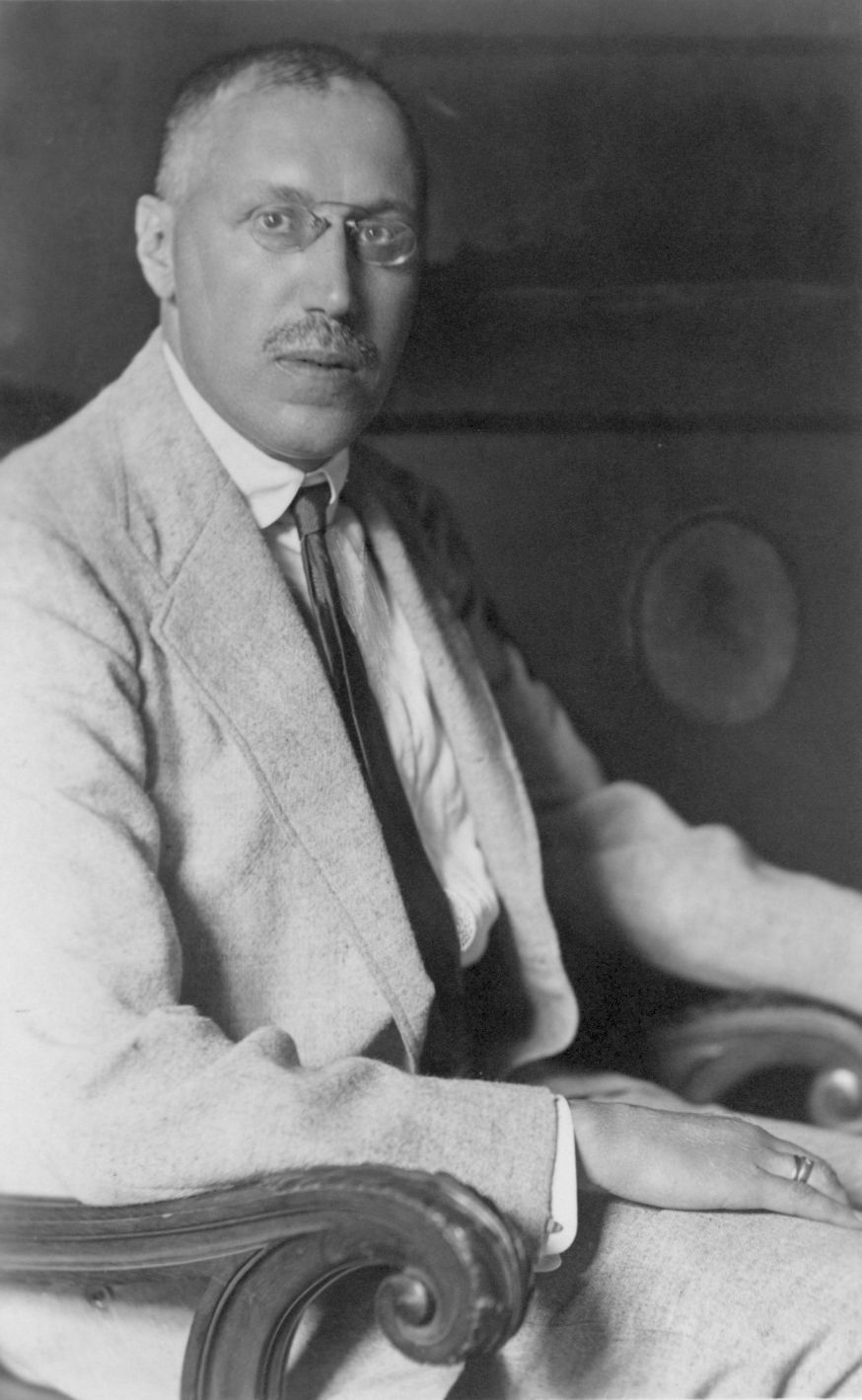
- Hahn in 1927
- Born: 27 September 1879; Vienna, Austria-Hungary
- Died: 24 July 1934 (aged 54); Vienna, Austria
- Education: University of Vienna (PhD, 1902)
- Known for: Hahn series; Hahn decomposition theorem; Hahn embedding theorem; Hahn–Banach theorem; Hahn–Kolmogorov theorem; Hahn–Mazurkiewicz theorem; Vitali–Hahn–Saks theorem; Canonical map; Uniform boundedness principle
- Awards: Lieben Prize (1921)
- Scientific career
- Fields: Mathematician; Philosopher
- Workplaces: University of Vienna; Chernivtsi University; University of Bonn
- Thesis: Zur Theorie der zweiten Variation einfacher Integrale (1902)
- Doctoral advisor: Gustav Ritter von Escherich
- Doctoral students: Karl Menger; Witold Hurewicz; Felix Frankl; Kurt Gödel
- Other notable students: Karl Popper

Hans Hahn (/hɑːn/; German: [haːn]; 27 September 1879 – 24 July 1934) was an Austrian mathematician and philosopher who made contributions to functional analysis, topology, set theory, the calculus of variations, real analysis, and order theory. In philosophy he was among the main logical positivists of the Vienna Circle.

== Biography ==
Hahn was born in Vienna, the son of Ludwig Benedikt Hahn, head of the Telegraphen-Korrespondenz Bureau, and Emma Hahn (née Blümel). His father converted from Judaism to Catholicism in 1877; his mother was Catholic. He was the brother of the painter Louise Fraenkel-Hahn and the philosopher and mathematician Olga Hahn-Neurath.

In 1898, Hahn became a student at the Universität Wien starting with a study of law. In 1899 he switched over to mathematics and spent some time at the universities of Strasbourg, Munich and Göttingen. In 1902 he took his Ph.D. in Vienna, on the subject "Zur Theorie der zweiten Variation einfacher Integrale". He was a student of Gustav von Escherich.

He was appointed to the teaching staff (habilitation) in Vienna in 1905. After 1905/1906 as a stand-in for Otto Stolz at the University of Innsbruck and some further years as a Privatdozent in Vienna, he was nominated in 1909 Professor extraordinarius in Czernowitz, at that time a town within the empire of Austria. After joining the Austrian army in 1915, he was badly wounded in 1916 and became again Professor extraordinarius, now in Bonn. In 1917 he was nominated a regular Professor there and in 1921 he returned to Vienna with this title, where he stayed until his rather early death in 1934 at the age of 54, following cancer surgery. He had married Eleonore ("Lilly") Minor in 1909, and they had a daughter, Nora (born 1910), who became an actress.

He was also interested in philosophy, and was part of a discussion group concerning Mach's positivism with Otto Neurath (who had married Hahn’s sister, Olga, in 1912) and Phillip Frank prior to the First World War. In 1922, he helped arrange Moritz Schlick's entry into the group, which led to the founding of the Vienna Circle, the group that was at the center of logical positivist thought in the 1920s. His most famous student was Kurt Gödel, whose Ph.D. thesis was completed in 1929. After the Anschluss, the fact that Hans Hahn had been of partial Jewish origin caused Gödel's difficulties with getting a position at the University of Vienna. Within the Vienna Circle, Hahn was also known (and controversial) for using his mathematical and philosophical work to study psychic phenomena; according to Karl Menger, he sometimes openly advocated further research into extrasensory perception while lecturing.

Politically Hahn was a socialist and was chairman of the Association of Socialist University Teachers. He contributed to the Social Democrat magazine Der Kampf.

Hahn's contributions to mathematics include the Hahn–Banach theorem and (independently of Banach and Steinhaus) the uniform boundedness principle. Other theorems include:

- the Hahn decomposition theorem;
- the Hahn embedding theorem;
- the Hahn–Kolmogorov theorem;
- the Hahn–Mazurkiewicz theorem;
- the Vitali–Hahn–Saks theorem.

Hahn authored the book (Hahn 1921): according to Arthur Rosenthal, "... (it) formed a great advance in the Theory of Real functions and had a great influence on the further development of this theory." He was also a co-author of the book Set Functions, published in 1948 by Arthur Rosenthal, fourteen years after his death in Vienna in 1934.

In 1921 he received the Richard Lieben Prize. In 1926 he was the president of the German Mathematical Society. In 1928 he was an Invited Speaker at the International Congress of Mathematicians in Bologna.

Hahn died in 1934 following surgery for a newly diagnosed cancer. He was only 54 and his death came as a shock to friends and colleagues.

== Publications ==
All his mathematical and philosophical works, except all books and all but one of his book reviews, are published in the three volumes (Hahn 1995), (Hahn 1996) and (Hahn 1997) of his "Collected papers".

- Hahn, Hans (1921), Theorie der reellen Funktionen. Erster Band (in German), Berlin–Heidelberg: Springer-Verlag, pp. VII+600, doi:10.1007/978-3-642-52624-4, hdl:2027/pst.000003378601, JFM 48.0261.09 ISBN 978-3-642-52570-4. (freely available at the Internet Archive).
- Hahn, Hans (1932), Reelle Funktionen. Tl. 1. Punktfunktionen, Mathematik und ihre Anwendungen in Monographien und Lehrbüchern (in German), vol. Band 13, Leipzig: Akademische Verlagsgesellschaft, pp. XII+415, JFM 58.0242.05, Zbl 0005.38903
- Hahn, Hans; Rosenthal, Arthur (1948), Set Functions, Albuquerque, N. M.: The University of New Mexico Press, pp. ix+324, MR 0024504, Zbl 0033.05301
- Hahn, Hans (1995), Gesammelte Abhandlungen/Collected works. Band 1/Vol. 1 (in German), Wien: Springer-Verlag, pp. xii+511, ISBN 978-3-211-82682-9, MR 1361405, Zbl 0859.01030
- Hahn, Hans (1996), Gesammelte Abhandlungen/Collected works. Band 2/Vol. 2 (in German), Wien: Springer-Verlag, pp. xiii+545, ISBN 978-3-211-82750-5, MR 1394443, Zbl 0847.01033.
- Hahn, Hans (1997), Gesammelte Abhandlungen/Collected works. Band 3/Vol. 3 (in German), Wien: Springer-Verlag, pp. xiii+581, ISBN 978-3-211-82781-9, MR 1452103, Zbl 0881.01046.

== See also ==
- Domain (mathematical analysis)
- Mathematical analysis
