= Rotation number =

Invariant of homeomorphisms of the circle

In mathematics, the rotation number is an invariant of homeomorphisms of the circle.

== History ==
It was first defined by Henri Poincaré in 1885, in relation to the precession of the perihelion of a planetary orbit. Poincaré later proved a theorem characterizing the existence of periodic orbits in terms of rationality of the rotation number.

== Definition ==
Suppose that $f:S^1 \to S^1$ is an orientation-preserving homeomorphism of the circle $S^1 = \R/\Z.$ Then f may be lifted to a homeomorphism $F: \R \to \R$ of the real line, satisfying

$$F(x + m) = F(x) +m$$

for every real number x and every integer m.

The rotation number of f is defined in terms of the iterates of F:

$$\omega(f)=\lim_{n\to\infty} \frac{F^n(x)-x}{n}.$$

Henri Poincaré proved that the limit exists and is independent of the choice of the starting point x. The lift F is unique modulo integers, therefore the rotation number is a well-defined element of $\R/\Z.$ Intuitively, it measures the average rotation angle along the orbits of f.

== Example ==
If $f$ is a rotation by $2\pi a$ (where $0 < a < 1$), then

$$F(x)=x+a,$$

and its rotation number is $a$ (cf. irrational rotation).

== Properties ==
The rotation number is invariant under topological conjugacy, and even monotone topological semiconjugacy: if f and g are two homeomorphisms of the circle and

$$h\circ f = g\circ h$$

for a monotone continuous map h of the circle into itself (not necessarily homeomorphic) then f and g have the same rotation numbers. It was used by Poincaré and Arnaud Denjoy for topological classification of homeomorphisms of the circle. There are two distinct possibilities.

- The rotation number of f is a rational number p/q (in the lowest terms). Then f has a periodic orbit, every periodic orbit has period q, and the order of the points on each such orbit coincides with the order of the points for a rotation by p/q. Moreover, every forward orbit of f converges to a periodic orbit. The same is true for backward orbits, corresponding to iterations of f^{–1}, but the limiting periodic orbits in forward and backward directions may be different.
- The rotation number of f is an irrational number θ. Then f has no periodic orbits (this follows immediately by considering a periodic point x of f). There are two subcases.

1. There exists a dense orbit. In this case f is topologically conjugate to the irrational rotation by the angle θ and all orbits are dense. Denjoy proved that this possibility is always realized when f is twice continuously differentiable.
2. There exists a Cantor set C invariant under f. Then C is a unique minimal set and the orbits of all points both in forward and backward direction converge to C. In this case, f is semiconjugate to the irrational rotation by θ, and the semiconjugating map h of degree 1 is constant on components of the complement of C.

The rotation number is continuous when viewed as a map from the group of homeomorphisms (with C^{0} topology) of the circle into the circle.

== See also ==
- Circle map
- Denjoy diffeomorphism
- Poincaré section
- Poincaré recurrence
- Poincaré–Bendixson theorem
