= Denjoy's theorem on rotation number =

When a diffeomorphism of the circle is topologically conjugate to an irrational rotation

In mathematics, the Denjoy theorem gives a sufficient condition for a diffeomorphism of the circle to be topologically conjugate to a diffeomorphism of a special kind, namely an irrational rotation. Denjoy (1932) proved the theorem in the course of his topological classification of homeomorphisms of the circle. He also gave an example of a C^{1} diffeomorphism with an irrational rotation number that is not conjugate to a rotation.

== Statement of the theorem ==
Let ƒ: S^{1} → S^{1} be an orientation-preserving diffeomorphism of the circle whose rotation number θ = ρ(ƒ) is irrational. Assume that it has positive derivative ƒ′(x) > 0 that is a continuous function with bounded variation on the interval [0,1). Then ƒ is topologically conjugate to the irrational rotation by θ. Moreover, every orbit is dense and every nontrivial interval I of the circle intersects its forward image ƒ°^{q}(I), for some q > 0 (this means that the non-wandering set of ƒ is the whole circle).

== Complements ==
If ƒ is a C^{2} map, then the hypothesis on the derivative holds; however, for any irrational rotation number Denjoy constructed an example showing that this condition cannot be relaxed to C^{1}, continuous differentiability of ƒ.

Vladimir Arnold showed that the conjugating map need not be smooth, even for an analytic diffeomorphism of the circle. Later Michel Herman proved that nonetheless, the conjugating map of an analytic diffeomorphism is itself analytic for "most" rotation numbers, forming a set of full Lebesgue measure, namely, for those that are badly approximable by rational numbers. His results are even more general and specify differentiability class of the conjugating map for C^{r} diffeomorphisms with any r ≥ 3.

== See also ==
- Circle map
