= Trigonometric series =

Infinite sum of sines and cosines

In mathematics, trigonometric series are a special class of orthogonal series of the form

$$A_0 + \sum_{n=1}^\infty A_n \cos{(nx)} + B_n \sin{(nx)},$$

where $x$ is the variable and $\{A_n\}$ and $\{B_n\}$ are coefficients. It is an infinite version of a trigonometric polynomial.

A trigonometric series is called the Fourier series of the integrable function $f$ if the coefficients have the form:

$$A_n=\frac1\pi \int^{2 \pi}_0\! f(x) \cos{(nx)} \,dx$$

$$B_n=\frac{1}{\pi}\displaystyle\int^{2 \pi}_0\! f(x) \sin{(nx)} \, dx$$

== Examples ==
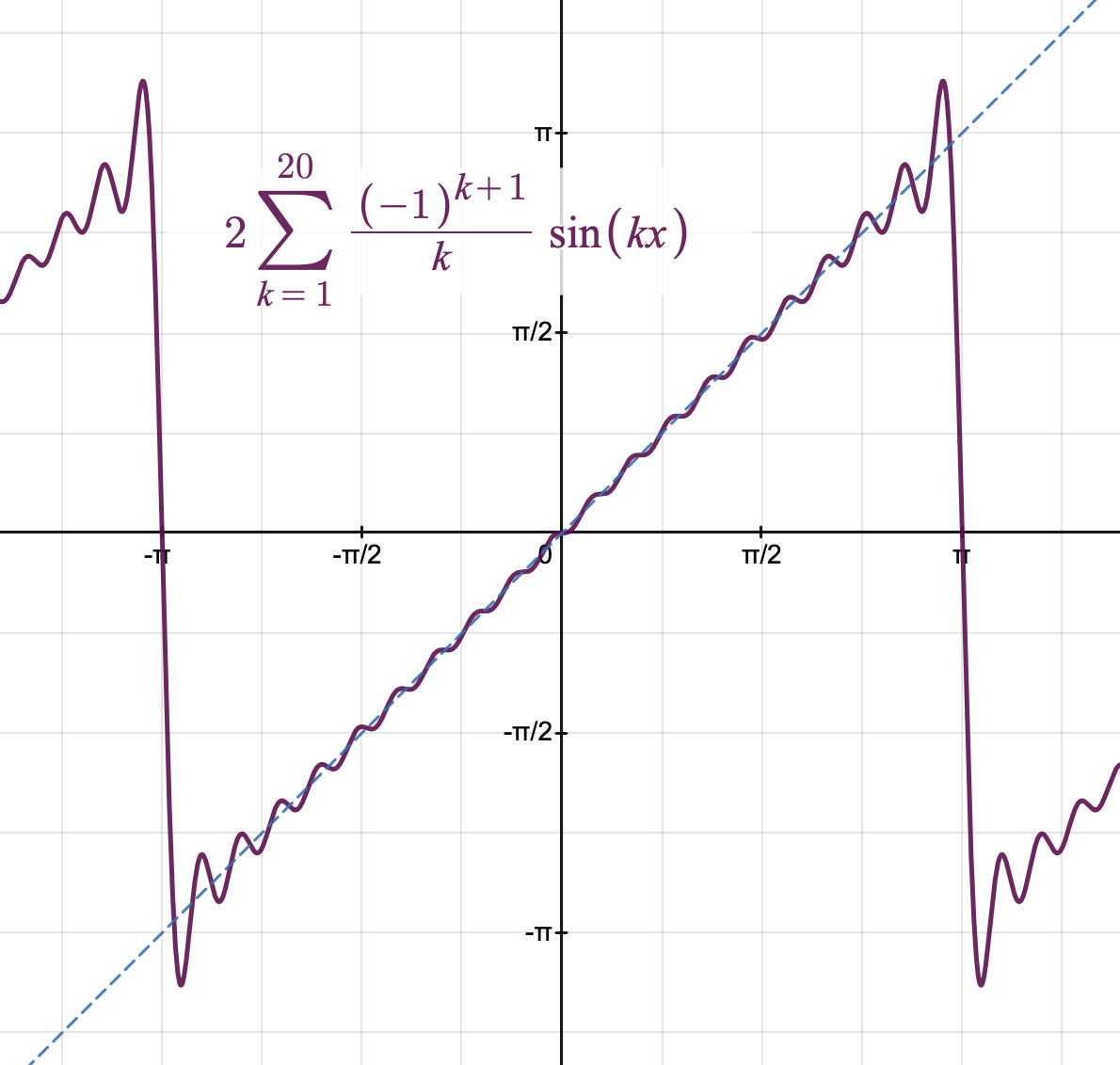
The Fourier series for the identity function suffers from the Gibbs phenomenon near the ends of the periodic interval.

Every Fourier series gives an example of a trigonometric series. Let the function $f(x) = x$ on $[-\pi,\pi]$ be extended periodically (see sawtooth wave). Then its Fourier coefficients are:

$$\begin{align}
A_n &= \frac1\pi\int_{-\pi}^{\pi} x \cos{(nx)} \,dx = 0, \quad n \ge 0. \\[4pt]
B_n &= \frac1\pi\int_{-\pi}^{\pi} x \sin{(nx)} \, dx \\[4pt]
&= -\frac{x}{n\pi} \cos{(nx)} + \frac1{n^2\pi}\sin{(nx)} \Bigg\vert_{x=-\pi}^\pi \\[5mu]
&= \frac{2\,(-1)^{n+1}}{n}, \quad n \ge 1.\end{align}$$

Which gives an example of a trigonometric series:

$$2\sum_{n=1}^\infty \frac{(-1)^{n+1}}{n} \sin{(nx)} = 2\sin{(x)} - \frac22\sin{(2x)} + \frac23\sin{(3x)} - \frac24\sin{(4x) } + \cdots$$

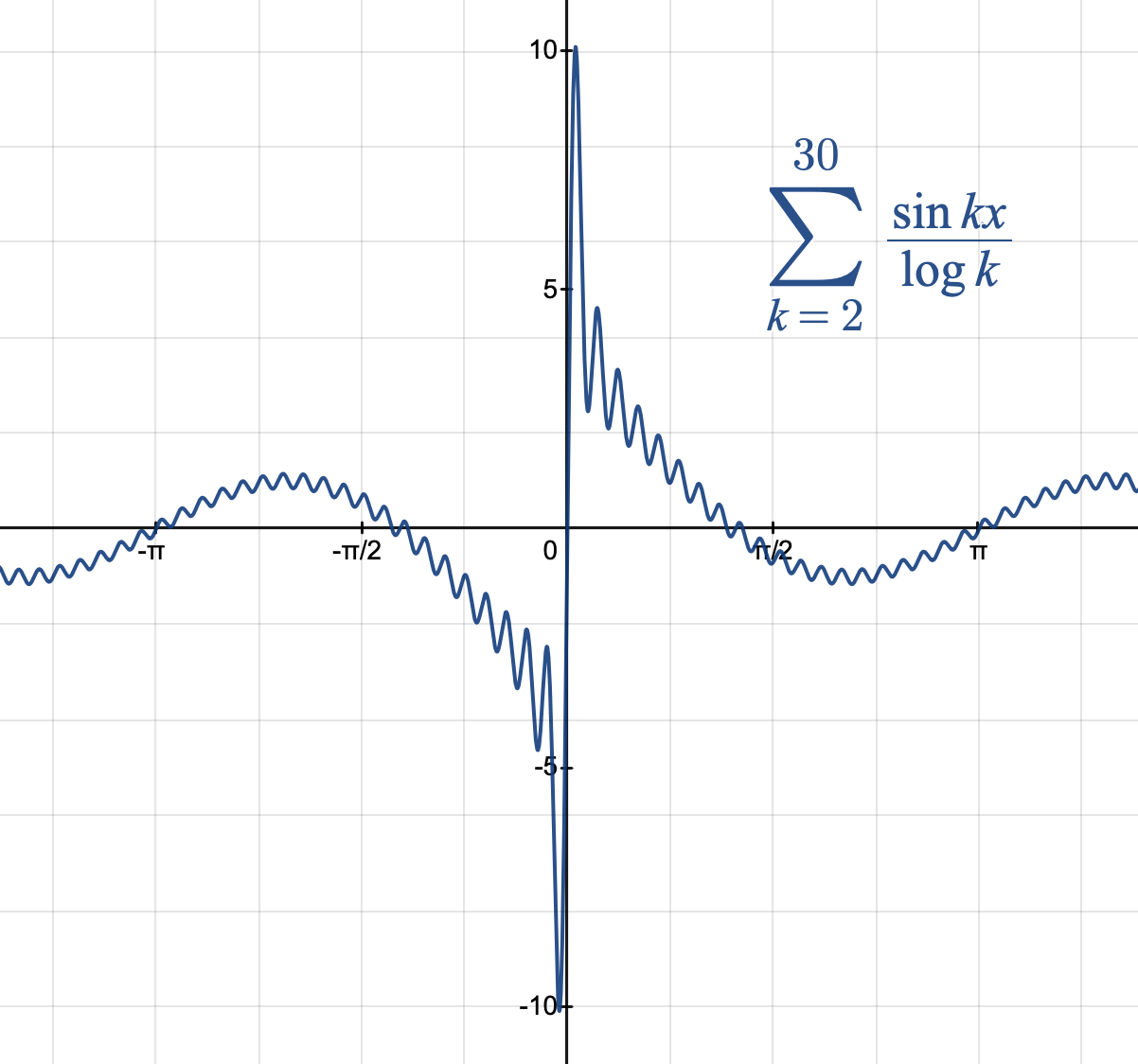
The trigonometric series sin 2x / log 2 + sin 3x / log 3 + sin 4x / log 4 + ... is not a Fourier series.

However, the converse is false. For example,

$$\sum_{n=2}^\infty \frac{\sin{(nx)}}{\log{n}} = \frac{\sin{(2x)}}{\log{2}} + \frac{\sin{(3x)}}{\log{3}} + \frac{\sin{( 4x)}}{\log{4}}+\cdots$$

is a trigonometric series which converges for all $x$ but is not a Fourier series.

== Uniqueness of trigonometric series ==
The uniqueness and the zeros of trigonometric series was an active area of research in 19th century Europe. First, Georg Cantor proved that if a trigonometric series is convergent to a function $f$ on the interval $[0, 2\pi]$, which is identically zero, or more generally, is nonzero on at most finitely many points, then the coefficients of the series are all zero.

Later Cantor proved that even if the set S on which $f$ is nonzero is infinite, but the derived set S' of S is finite, then the coefficients are all zero. In fact, he proved a more general result. Let S_{0} = S and let S_{k+1} be the derived set of S_{k}. If there is a finite number n for which S_{n} is finite, then all the coefficients are zero. Later, Lebesgue proved that if there is a countably infinite ordinal α such that S_{α} is finite, then the coefficients of the series are all zero. Cantor's work on the uniqueness problem famously led him to invent transfinite ordinal numbers, which appeared as the subscripts α in S_{α} .

== See also ==
- Denjoy–Luzin theorem
