= Julius Wolff (mathematician) =

Dutch mathematician (1882–1945)

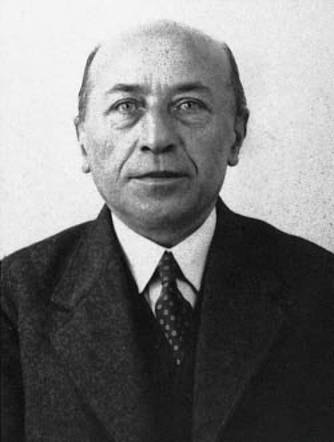
- Julius Wolff 1882 - 1945
- Born: 18 April 1882; Nijmegen, Netherlands
- Died: 8 February 1945 (aged 62); Bergen-Belsen concentration camp, Nazi Germany
- Education: Universiteit van Amsterdam
- Known for: Denjoy–Wolff theorem, boundary version of the Schwarz lemma
- Spouse: Betsy Gersons (Tilburg 12 June 1889 – Bergen-Belsen 9 March 1945)
- Children: Louis (died 11 May 1940 in Amsterdam), Ernst (Groningen 9 October 1919 – Bergen-Belsen 3 March 1945)
- Scientific career
- Thesis: Dynamen, beschouwd als duale vectoren (1908)
- Doctoral advisor: Diederik Johannes Korteweg

Julius Wolff (18 April 1882 – 8 February 1945) was a Dutch-Jewish mathematician, known for the Denjoy–Wolff theorem and for his boundary version of the Schwarz lemma. With his family he was arrested in Utrecht by the Nazi occupation forces of the Netherlands on 8 March 1943 and transported to the Bergen-Belsen concentration camp on 13 September 1944, where he died of epidemic typhus on 8 February 1945, shortly before the camp was liberated.

Wolff studied mathematics and physics at the University of Amsterdam, where he earned his doctorate in 1908 under Korteweg with thesis Dynamen, beschouwd als duale vectoren. From 1907 to 1917 he taught at secondary and grammar schools in Meppel, Middelburg, and Amsterdam. In 1917 Wolff was appointed Professor of differential calculus, theory of functions and higher algebra at the University of Groningen and in 1922 at Utrecht University. He was also a statistical advisor for the life insurance company (or co-operative distributive society) "Eigen Hulp," (a predecessor of AEGON) with offices at The Hague.

== Publications ==
- Wolff, J. (1926), "Sur l'itération des fonctions holomorphes dans une région, et dont les valeurs appartiennent à cette région", C. R. Acad. Sci., 182, Paris: 42–43
- Wolff, J. (1926), "Sur une généralisation d'un théorème de Schwarz", C. R. Acad. Sci., 182, Paris: 918–920
- Wolff, J. (1931). Fourier'sche Reihen, mit Aufgaben. Groningen: P. Noordhoff.
- van Aardenne-Ehrenfest, T.; Wolff, J. (1943–1944). "Über die Grenzen der einfachzusammenhängenden Gebiete". Commentarii Mathematici Helvetici. 16: 321–323. doi:10.1007/BF02568584. S2CID 124837715.

== Gallery ==
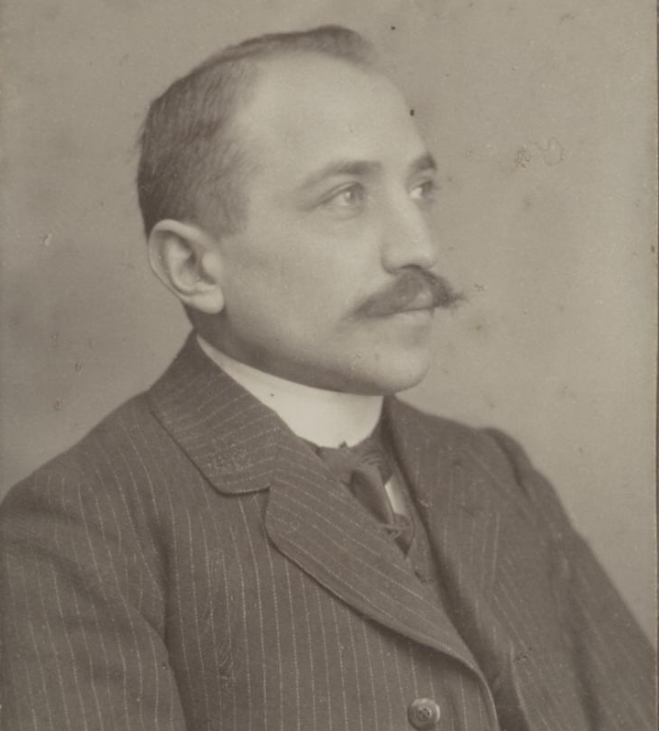
Julius Wolff, mathematics teacher in secondary education at Middelburg, Zeeland, 1911

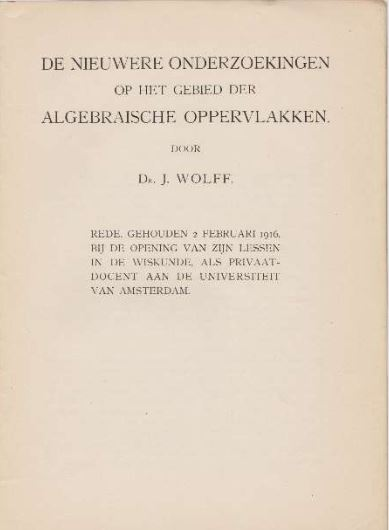
Wolff: De nieuwe onderzoekingen op het gebied der algebraïsche oppervlakken. Rede, Inaugural lecture (Translated title: New research in algebraic surfaces), University of Amsterdam 1916

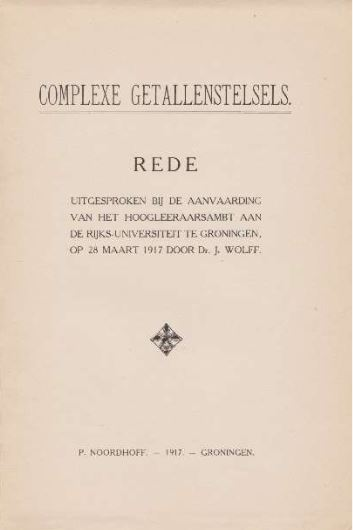
Wolff: Complexe getallenstelsels. Rede, Inaugural lecture (Translated title: Complex number systems), University of Groningen, 1917

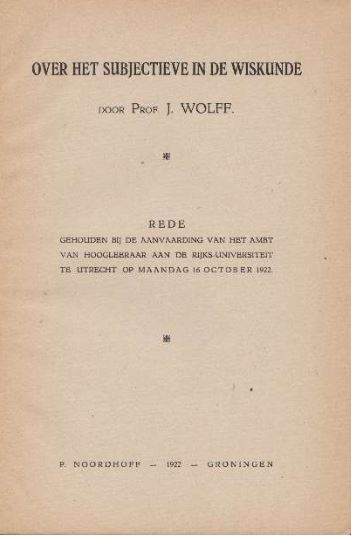
Wolff: Over het subjectieve in de wiskunde. Rede, Inaugural lecture (Translated title: About the subjective in mathematics), University of Utrecht 1922

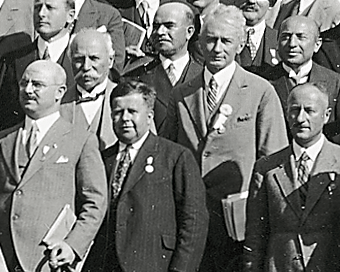
Julius Wolff (rightmost in top row) at the International Congress of Mathematicians, Zürich 1932

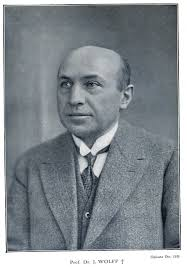
Julius Wolff, date unknown

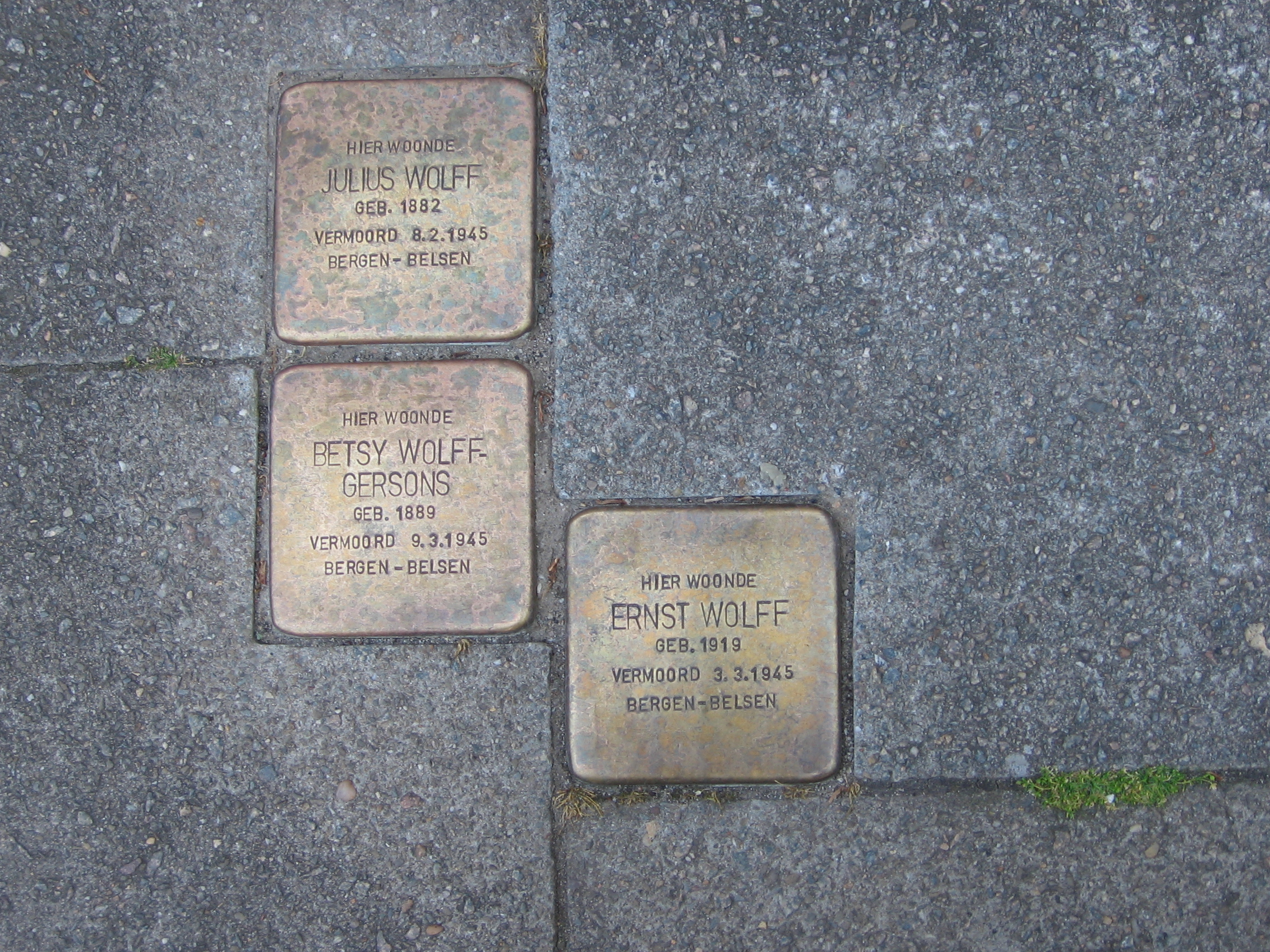
Stolpersteine (brass plates on concrete to commemorate the Jewish victims of the Holocaust) in front of the domicile of Julius Wolff and his family, Stadhouderslaan 51, Utrecht, 2019

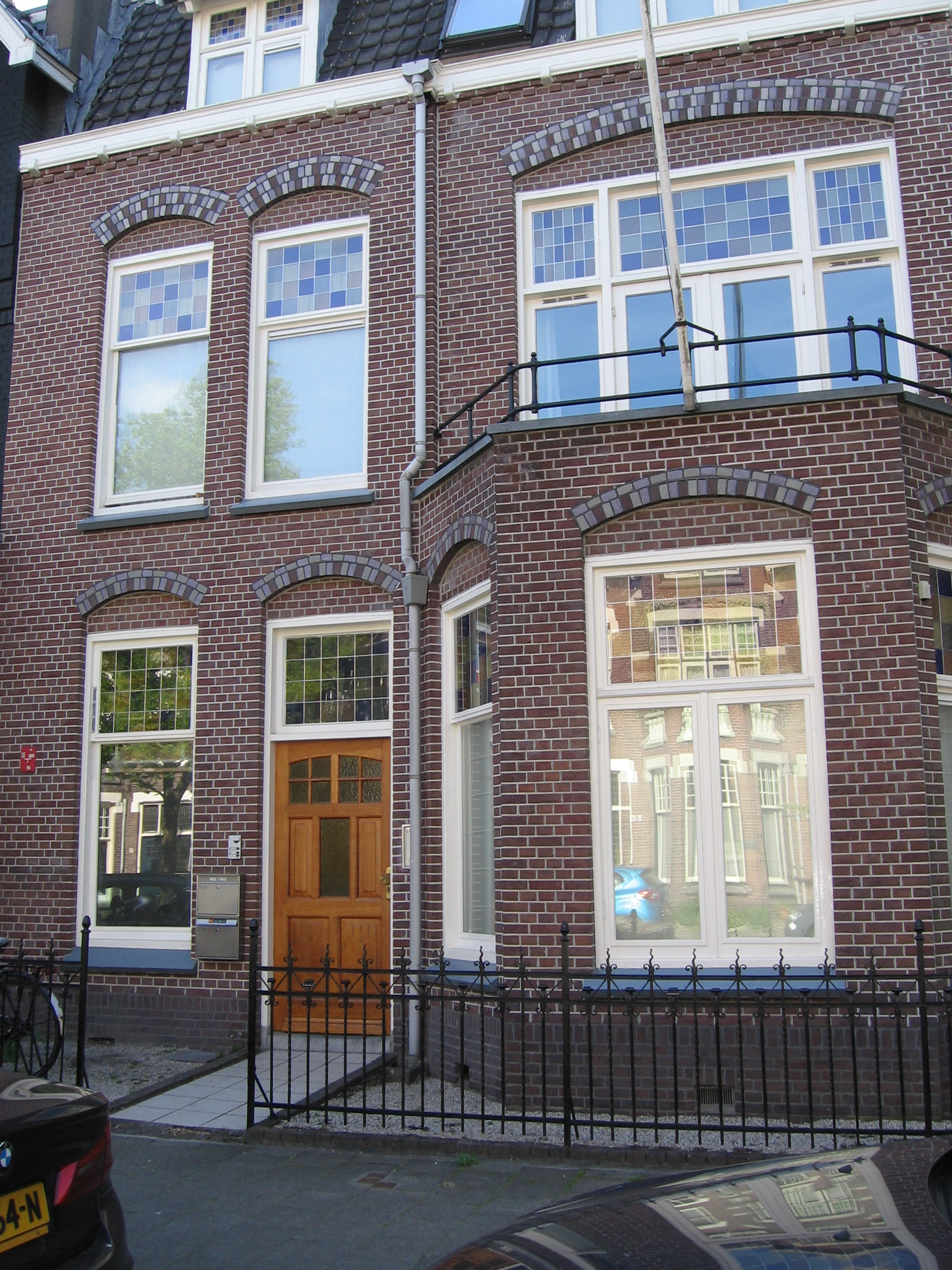
Address of Julius Wolff and his family, Stadhouderslaan 51, Utrecht, 2019.

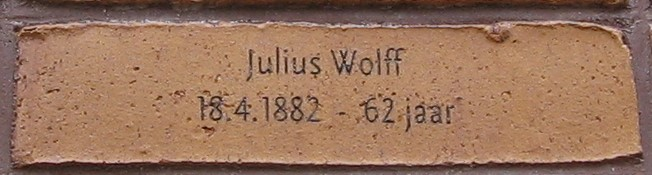
"Julius Wolff - 18.04.1882 - 62 jaar". National Holocaust Names Memorial, Amsterdam, 2023.
