= Stanisław Saks =

Polish mathematician (1897–1942)

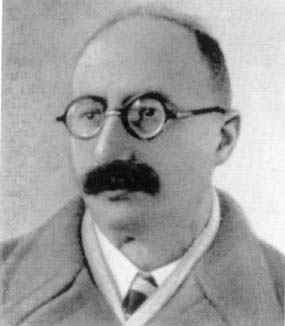
- before 1942
- Born: 30 December 1897; Kalisz, Congress Poland
- Died: 23 November 1942 (aged 44); Warsaw, German-occupied Poland
- Cause of death: Execution
- Education: Warsaw University
- Known for: Vitali–Hahn–Saks theorem Denjoy–Luzin–Saks theorem Denjoy–Young–Saks theorem
- Scientific career
- Fields: Mathematics

Stanisław Saks (30 December 1897 – 23 November 1942) was a Polish mathematician and university tutor, a member of the Lwów School of Mathematics, known primarily for his membership in the Scottish Café circle, an extensive monograph on the theory of integrals, his works on measure theory and the Vitali–Hahn–Saks theorem.

== Life and work ==
Stanisław Saks was born on 30 December 1897 in Kalisz, Congress Poland, to an assimilated Polish-Jewish family. In 1915 he graduated from a local gymnasium and joined the newly recreated Warsaw University. In 1922 he received a doctorate of his alma mater with a prestigious distinction maxima cum laude. Soon afterwards he also passed his habilitation and received the Rockefeller fellowship, which allowed him to travel to the United States. Around that time he started publishing articles in various mathematical journals, mostly the Fundamenta Mathematicae, but also in the Transactions of the American Mathematical Society. He participated in the Silesian Uprisings and was awarded the Cross of the Valorous and the Medal of Independence for his bravery. Following the end of the uprising he returned to Warsaw and resumed his academic career.

For most of it he studied the theories of functions and functionals in particular. In 1930 he published his most notable book, the Zarys teorii całki (Sketch on the Theory of the Integral), which later got expanded and translated into several languages, including English (Theory of the Integral), French (Théorie de l'Intégrale) and Russian (Teoriya Integrala). Despite his successes, Saks was never awarded the title of professor and remained an ordinary tutor, initially at his alma mater and the Warsaw University of Technology, and later at the Lwów University and Wilno University. He was also an active socialist and a journalist at the Robotnik weekly (1919–1926) and later a collaborator of the Association of Socialist Youth.

Saks wrote a mathematics book with Antoni Zygmund, Analytic Functions, in 1933. It was translated into English in 1952 by E. J. Scott. In the preface to the English edition, Zygmund writes:

Stanislaw Saks was a man of moral as well as physical courage, of rare intelligence and wit. To his colleagues and pupils he was an inspiration not only as a mathematician but as a human being. In the period between the two world wars he exerted great influence upon a whole generation of Polish mathematicians in Warsaw and Lwów. In November 1942, at the age of 45, Saks died in a Warsaw prison, victim of a policy of extermination.

After the outbreak of World War II and the occupation of Poland by Germany, Saks joined the Polish underground. Arrested in November 1942, he was executed on 23 November 1942 by the German Gestapo in Warsaw.

== Publications ==
- Saks, Stanisław (1937). Theory of the Integral. Monografie Matematyczne. Vol. 7 (2nd ed.). Warsaw-Lwów: G.E. Stechert & Co. pp. VI+347. JFM 63.0183.05. Zbl 0017.30004.. English translation by Laurence Chisholm Young, with two additional notes by Stefan Banach.
- Saks, Stanisław; Zygmund, Antoni (1965). Analytic functions. Monografie Matematyczne. Vol. 28 (Second ed.). Warsaw: Państwowe Wydawnietwo Naukowe. MR 0180658.

== See also ==
- Lwów School of Mathematics
