= Vitali–Hahn–Saks theorem =

In mathematics, the Vitali–Hahn–Saks theorem, introduced by Vitali (1907), Hahn (1922), and Saks (1933), proves that a pointwise convergent sequence of finite measures is uniformly absolutely continuous with respect to any common dominating finite measure, and its limit is also a finite measure. This holds in the more general setting of finite signed measures or complex measures.

== Preliminaries ==
Let $(S,\mathcal{B})$ be a measurable space and let $\lambda$ be a complex measure. The variation of $\lambda$ is the finite measure $|\lambda|\colon\mathcal{B}\to\mathbb{R}$ given by
$$|\lambda|(B) = \sup_{\pi} \sum_{A\in\pi} |\lambda(A)|,$$
where the supremum is taken over all partitions $\pi$ of $B$ into a countable number of disjoint measurable subsets. The total variation is then $\lVert\lambda\rVert_{TV} = |\lambda|(S)$.

A complex measure $\lambda$ is called absolutely continuous with respect to some measure $m$ (denoted $\lambda\ll m$), if $|\lambda|(B)=0$ for all measurable sets $B\in\mathcal{B}$ with $m(B)=0$. This is equivalent to the following: For every $\varepsilon>0$ there is a $\delta>0$ so that $m(B)<\delta$ implies $|\lambda|(B)<\varepsilon$. Since
$$|\lambda(B)| \le |\lambda|(B) \le 4 \sup_{A\subseteq B} |\lambda(A)|,$$
absolute continuity is also equivalent to the following: For every $\varepsilon>0$ there is a $\delta>0$ so that $m(B)<\delta$ implies $|\lambda(B)|<\varepsilon$.

If $\lambda\ll m$, then, by the Radon–Nikodym theorem there is an integrable function $f\colon S\to\mathbb{C}$, such that $\textstyle\lambda(B)=\int_B f \, dm$ for every measurable $B\in\mathcal{B}$. This function is uniquely defined up to an $m$-null set and called a Radon–Nikodym derivative of $\lambda$ with respect to $m$. It is usually denoted by $\textstyle f = \frac{d\lambda}{dm}$.

== Statement of the theorem ==
Let $(S,\mathcal{B})$ be a measurable space and let $(\lambda_n)_{n\ge1}$ be a sequence of finite complex measures such that the pointwise limit $\textstyle\lim_{n\to\infty} \lambda_n(B)$ exists in $\mathbb{C}$ for every measurable set $B\in\mathcal{B}$. Define the function $\lambda\colon\mathcal{B}\to\mathbb{C}$ by
$$\lambda(B) = \lim_{n\to\infty} \lambda_n(B).$$
Then, the following holds:

- Countable Additivity and Boundedness: $\lambda$ is countably additive and thus a finite complex measure. Furthermore, $\sup_{n\ge1} \lVert\lambda_n\rVert_{TV} < \infty$ and $\lVert\lambda\rVert_{TV} < \infty$.
- Absolute Continuity: Assume that $m$ is a finite measure on $(S,\mathcal{B})$ satisfying $\lambda_n\ll m$ for all $n\ge1$, such as
  $$m=\sum_{n\ge1} \frac{|\lambda_n|}{2^n(1+\lVert\lambda_n\rVert_{TV})}\,.$$
  Then, $\lambda$ is also absolutely continuous with respect to $m$, that is $\lambda\ll m$, and the sequence $(\lambda_n)_{n\ge1}$ is uniformly absolutely continuous with respect to $m$, that is, for every $\varepsilon>0$ there is a $\delta>0$ so that $m(B)<\delta$ implies $|\lambda_n(B)|<\varepsilon$ uniformly for all $n\ge1$.
- Densities: Again, if $m$ is a finite measure on $(S,\mathcal{B})$ satisfying $\lambda_n\ll m$ for all $n\ge1$, set $\textstyle f_n = \frac{d\lambda_n}{dm}$ for all $n\ge1$ and $\textstyle f = \frac{d\lambda}{dm}$. Then, $(f_n)_{n\ge1}$ is uniformly integrable and $f_n$ converges in $L^1(S,\mathcal B,m)$ with respect to the weak topology $\sigma(L^1,L^\infty)$, that is,
  $$\int g f_n \, dm \to \int g f \, dm$$
  for all bounded measurable $g\colon S\to\mathbb{C}$.

== Preparations for the Proof ==
Let $(S,\mathcal{B},m)$ be a measure space and write $\mathcal{B}_0$ to denote the set of measurable sets $B\in\mathcal{B}$ with $m(B)<\infty$:
$$\mathcal{B}_0 = \{B\in\mathcal{B} : m(B)<\infty\}.$$
Write $B_1\mathbin\vartriangle B_2 = (B_1\setminus B_2) \cup (B_2\setminus B_1)$ to denote the symmetric difference of the sets $B_1,B_2$. Define the equivalence relation $\approx$ on $\mathcal{B}_0$ by $B_1\approx B_2$ if $m(B_1\mathbin\vartriangle B_2)=0$. Write $\bar\mathcal{B}_0 = \mathcal{B}_0/\mathord{\approx}$ to denote the quotient set of $\mathcal{B}_0$ with respect to the equivalence relation $\approx$:
$$\bar\mathcal{B}_0 = \{ \bar B : B\in\mathcal{B}_0 \},$$
where $\bar B = \{ A\in\mathcal{B}_0 : A\approx B \}$ is the equivalence class of $B$. Then, $m$ induces a well-defined quotient map on $\bar\mathcal{B}_0$ which is denoted by $\bar m$: $\bar m(\bar B)=m(B)$.

Proposition: Define $d_m\colon\bar\mathcal{B}_0\times\bar\mathcal{B}_0\to\mathbb{R}$ by
$$d_m(\bar B_1,\bar B_2) = m(B_1\mathbin\vartriangle B_2).$$
Then, $d_m$ is well-defined and $(\bar\mathcal{B}_0,d_m)$ is a complete metric space.

Proof of the Proposition

Using indicator functions as before, we have
$$d_m(\bar B_1,\bar B_2)
= m(B_1\mathbin\vartriangle B_2)
= \int |\mathbf1_{B_1}-\mathbf1_{B_2}| \, dm
= \lVert \mathbf1_{B_1}-\mathbf1_{B_2}\rVert_1.$$
This means that the metric space $(\bar\mathcal{B}_0,d_m)$ can be identified with a subset of the space $L^1(S,\mathcal{B},m)$ which is a Banach space. Hence, $d_m$ is a well-defined metric. Consider a Cauchy sequence $(\bar B_n)_{n\ge1}$. Then,
$$\lim_{k,n\to\infty} d_m(\bar B_k,\bar B_n)
= \lim_{k,n\to\infty} \lVert\mathbf1_{B_k} - \mathbf1_{B_n}\rVert_1 = 0.$$
Hence, we can choose a subsequence $(\bar B_{n_k})_{k\ge1}$ such that $(\mathbf1_{B_{n_k}})_{k\ge1}$ converges almost everywhere. Define $g\colon S\to\mathbb{R}$ by
$$g(x) = \lim_{k\to\infty} \mathbf1_{B_{n_k}}.$$
Then, $g$ is measurable, has values in $\{0,1\}$ almost everywhere and
$$\lim_{k\to\infty} \lVert\mathbf1_{B_{n_k}} - g\rVert_1 = 0.$$
Therefore, $g = \mathbf1_{B_{\infty}}$ almost everywhere for some $B_{\infty}\in\mathcal{B}_0$ and
$$\lim_{k\to\infty} d_m(\bar B_{n_k}, \bar B_\infty)
= \lim_{k\to\infty} \lVert\mathbf1_{B_{n_k}} - \mathbf1_{B_\infty}\rVert_1 = 0,$$
that is, the Cauchy sequence $(\bar B_n)_{n\ge1}$ contains a convergent subsequence and is convergent itself. Therefore, $\bar\mathcal{B}_0$ is complete. We remark that $B_{\infty}$ is explicitly given by the limit inferior of the sequence $(\bar B_{n_k})_{k\ge1}$:
$$B_\infty
= \liminf_{k\to\infty} B_{n_k}
= \bigcup_{k=1}^\infty \bigcap_{j=k}^\infty B_{n_j}.$$

Proposition: Let $(\lambda_n)_{n\ge1}$ be a sequence of complex measures such that $(\lVert\lambda_n\rVert_{TV})_{n\ge1}$ is bounded. Then, $(\lambda_n)_{n\ge1}$ converges pointwise, that is, the sequence $(\lambda_n(B))_{n\ge1}$ converges for every $B\in\mathcal{B}$, if and only if, for every bounded measurable function $g\colon S\to\mathbb{C}$, the sequence $\textstyle(\int g \, d\lambda_n)_{n\ge1}$ converges.

Proof of the Proposition

The implication $\Leftarrow$ is obvious, since, for every $B\in\mathcal{B}$, the indicator function $\mathbf 1_B$ with
$$\mathbf 1_B(x) = \begin{cases}
1, & \text{if } x\in B, \\
0, & \text{if } x\notin B,
\end{cases}$$
is bounded and measurable and $\textstyle\lambda_n(B) = \int \mathbf 1_B \, d\lambda_n$. For the other implication $\Rightarrow$, we first note that, by linearity of limits, the sequence $\textstyle(\int s \, d\lambda_n)_{n\ge1}$ converges for all measurable simple functions $s\colon S\to\mathbb{C}$. Write $K$ for the bound of total variations:
$$K = \sup_{n\ge1} \lVert\lambda_n\rVert_{TV}.$$
Given a bounded measurable function $g\colon S\to\mathbb{C}$ and an $\varepsilon>0$ there is a measurable simple function $s\colon S\to\mathbb{C}$ with $\lVert g-s\rVert_\infty<\varepsilon$. Furthermore, $\textstyle(\int s \, d\lambda_n)_{n\ge1}$ converges, thus there exists $N$ such that
$$\left| \int s \, d\lambda_k - \int s \, d\lambda_n \right| < \varepsilon$$
for all $k,n>N$. Then,
$$\begin{align}
\left| \int g \, d\lambda_k - \int g \, d\lambda_n \right|
&\le \left| \int g \, d\lambda_k - \int s \, d\lambda_k \right| + \left| \int s \, d\lambda_k - \int s \, d\lambda_n \right| + \left| \int s \, d\lambda_n - \int g \, d\lambda_n \right| \\
&\le \int |g-s| \, d|\lambda_k| + \left| \int s \, d\lambda_k - \int s \, d\lambda_n \right| + \int |g-s| \, d|\lambda_n| \\
&< \varepsilon (2K+1)
\end{align}$$
for all $k,n>N$. Consequently, the sequence $\textstyle(\int g \, d\lambda_n)_{n\ge1}$ converges.

Let $m$ be a measure on $(S,\mathcal{B})$. Fix some $\delta>0$. A set $B\in\mathcal{B}$ is called $\delta$-indivisible, if it cannot be partitioned into two disjoint measurable subsets $B_1, B_2 \in \mathcal{B}$ satisfying $m(B_1)\ge\delta$ and $m(B_2)\ge\delta$.

Proposition: Let $m$ be a finite measure on $(S,\mathcal{B})$ and fix some $\delta>0$. Then, there exists a partition $\pi$ of $S$ into at most $\lfloor m(S)/\delta\rfloor+1$ disjoint $\delta$-indivisible, measurable sets.

Proof of the Proposition

Start with the partition $\pi_1=\{S\}$. Assume that $\pi_n$ is already defined. If all sets in $\pi_n$ are already $\delta$-indivisible, then set $\pi_{n+1}=\pi_n$. If not, pick one set $B\in\pi_n$ that is not $\delta$-indivisible. Then, $B$ can be partitioned into two disjoint measurable subsets $B_1, B_2 \in \mathcal{B}$ satisfying $m(B_1)\ge\delta$ and $m(B_2)\ge\delta$. In this case, set $\pi_{n+1} = (\pi_n \setminus \{B\}) \cup \{B_1, B_2\}$. This process must stabilize after at most $\lfloor m(S)/\delta\rfloor$, since each splitting creates a new set of measure at least $\delta$.

== Proof of Vitali-Hahn-Saks theorem ==
Let $m$ be a finite measure on $(S,\mathcal{B})$ satisfying $\lambda_n\ll m$ for all $n\ge1$. If none is given, take for instance
$$m = \sum_{n\ge1} \frac{|\lambda_n|}{2^n(1+\lVert\lambda_n\rVert_{TV})}\,,$$
as mentioned above. Since $m$ is finite, we have $\mathcal{B}_0 = \mathcal{B}$. Furthermore, we write $\bar\mathcal{B}$ for the quotient set $\bar\mathcal{B}_0$ above. Each $\lambda_n$ defines a quotient map $\bar\lambda_n$ on $\bar\mathcal{B}$ by $\bar\lambda_n(\bar B)=\lambda_n(B)$. This quotient map $\bar\lambda_n$ is well-defined: If $A\in\bar B$, then $m(A\mathbin\vartriangle B)=0$ and thus $|\lambda_n|(A\mathbin\vartriangle B)=0$, since $\lambda_n\ll m$. Therefore, $\lambda_n(A)=\lambda_n(B)$. Moreover, $\bar\lambda_n$ is continuous as a function from the metric space $(\bar\mathcal{B},d_m)$ to $\mathbb C$.

Fix $\varepsilon>0$. For every $n,k\ge1$ the function $|\bar\lambda_n - \bar\lambda_{n+k}|$ is again continuous, so that
$$F_{n,k,\varepsilon}
= \left\{ \bar B\in\bar\mathcal{B} \,:\,
|\bar\lambda_n(\bar B) - \bar\lambda_{n+k}(\bar B)|
\le \varepsilon \right\}$$
is a closed subset of $\bar\mathcal{B}$. Consequently,
$$F_{n,\varepsilon}
= \bigcap_{k\ge1} F_{n,k,\varepsilon}
= \left\{ \bar B\in\bar\mathcal{B} \,:\,
\sup_{k\ge1} |\bar\lambda_n(\bar B) - \bar\lambda_{n+k}(\bar B)|
\le \varepsilon \right\}$$
is also a closed subset of $\bar\mathcal{B}$. By the hypothesis the sequence $(\lambda_n(B))_{n\ge1}$ converges for every $B\in\mathcal{B}$, so that
$$\sup_{k\ge1} |\bar\lambda_n(\bar B) - \bar\lambda_{n+k}(\bar B)|
= \sup_{k\ge1} |\lambda_n(B) - \lambda_{n+k}(B)|
\to 0.$$
Therefore, we obtain
$$\bar\mathcal{B} = \bigcup_{n=1}^\infty F_{n,\varepsilon}.$$
By Baire category theorem at least one of the sets $(F_{n,\varepsilon})_{n\ge1}$ must contain a non-empty open set of $\bar\mathcal{B}$. This means that there is $n_0\ge1$ and $B_0\in\mathcal{B}$ and an $r_0>0$ such that $F_{n_0,\varepsilon}$ contains the open ball in $\bar\mathcal{B}$ with center $\bar B_0$ and radius $r_0$:
$$\{ \bar B\in\bar\mathcal B : d_m(\bar B,\bar B_0)<r_0 \}
\subseteq F_{n_0,\varepsilon}.$$
In other words:
$$d_m(\bar B,\bar B_0)<r_0
\quad\Longrightarrow\quad
\sup_{k\geq1} |\bar\lambda_{n_0}(\bar B)-\bar\lambda_{n_0+k}(\bar B)|
\le\varepsilon.$$
Since $\lambda_n\ll m$ for all $n<n_0$, there is a $\delta>0$, so that $m(B)<\delta$ implies $|\lambda_n(B)|<\varepsilon$ for all $n<n_0$. We may choose $\delta>0$ sufficiently small, so that $\delta\le r_0$.

Now, consider a measurable set $B\in\mathcal{B}$ with $m(B)<\delta$. Define $B_1=B\cup B_0$ and $B_2=B_0\setminus B$. Then, we have
$$B
= (B\cup B_0) \setminus (B_0\setminus B)
= B_1 \setminus B_2$$
and
$$\begin{align}
d_m(\bar B_1, \bar B_0)
&= m(B_1 \mathbin\vartriangle B_0)
= m((B\cup B_0) \mathbin\vartriangle B_0)
\le m(B)
< \delta, \\
d_m(\bar B_2, \bar B_0)
&= m(B_2 \mathbin\vartriangle B_0)
= m((B_0\setminus B) \mathbin\vartriangle B_0)
\le m(B)
< \delta.
\end{align}$$
Thus, if $n<n_0$, then $|\lambda_n(B)|<\varepsilon$ and, if $n\ge n_0$, then
$$\begin{align}
|\lambda_n(B)|
&\le |\lambda_{n_0}(B)| + |\lambda_{n_0}(B)-\lambda_n(B)| \\
&\le |\lambda_{n_0}(B)| + |\lambda_{n_0}(B_1)-\lambda_n(B_1)| + |\lambda_{n_0}(B_2)-\lambda_n(B_2)| \\
&< 3\epsilon
\end{align}$$
Therefore, $(\lambda_n)_{n\ge1}$ is uniformly absolutely continuous with respect to $m$.

By the linearity of the limit $\lambda$ is finitely additive. And by uniformly absolute continuity of $(\lambda_n)_{n\ge1}$ the limit $\lambda$ is actually countably additive.

Next, we prove boundedness of the total variations: Fix $\varepsilon=1$. By uniformly absolute continuity of $(\lambda_n)_{n\ge1}$ there is $\delta>0$ such that $m(B)<\delta$ implies $|\lambda_n(B)|<1$. By the third proposition above, there is a finite partition $\pi$ of $S$ into $\delta$-indivisible sets with respect to the finite measure $m$. For any $B\in\pi$ and any measurable $A\subseteq B$, we cannot have both, $m(A)\ge\delta$ and $m(B\setminus A)\ge\delta$. If $m(A)<\delta$, then, by uniformly absolute continuity,
$$|\lambda_n(A)| < 1 \le |\lambda_n(B)|+1$$
for all $n\ge1$. If, on the other hand $m(B\setminus A)<\delta$, then, again by uniform absolute continuity, $|\lambda_n(B\setminus A)|<1$ for all $n\ge1$, which implies
$$|\lambda_n(A)|
=|\lambda_n(B)-\lambda_n(B\setminus A)|
\le |\lambda_n(B)|+|\lambda_n(B\setminus A)|
< |\lambda_n(B)|+1$$
for all $n\ge1$. In both cases, for every measurable subset $A\subseteq B$ and every $n\ge1$:
$$|\lambda_n(A)| < |\lambda_n(B)|+1$$
Thus,
$$|\lambda_n|(B)
\le 4 \sup_{A\subseteq B} |\lambda_n(A)|
\le 4 |\lambda_n(B)| + 4$$
Since $(\lambda_n(B))_{n\ge1}$ converges for every $B\in\pi$ and $\pi$ is finite, we have
$$C = \max_{B\in\pi} \sup_{n\ge1} |\lambda_n(B)| < \infty$$
and therefore
$$\lVert\lambda_n\rVert_{TV}
= \sum_{B\in\pi} |\lambda_n|(B)
\le \sum_{B\in\pi} (4|\lambda_n(B)|+4)
\le (4C+4)|\pi| < \infty.$$

The remaining assertions of the theorem follow directly using the second proposition above and boundedness of all total variations.
