= Netto's theorem =

Theorem that smooth bijections preserve dimension

The first three steps of construction of the Hilbert curve, a space-filling curve that by Netto's theorem has many self-intersections

An Osgood curve, with no self-intersections. By Netto's theorem it is impossible for such a curve to entirely cover any two-dimensional region.

In mathematical analysis, Netto's theorem states that continuous bijections of smooth manifolds preserve dimension. That is, there does not exist a continuous bijection between two smooth manifolds of different dimension. It is named after Eugen Netto.

The case for maps from a higher-dimensional manifold to a one-dimensional manifold was proven by Jacob Lüroth in 1878, using the intermediate value theorem to show that no manifold containing a topological circle can be mapped continuously and bijectively to the real line. Both Netto in 1878, and Georg Cantor in 1879, gave faulty proofs of the general theorem. The faults were later recognized and corrected.

An important special case of this theorem concerns the non-existence of continuous bijections from one-dimensional spaces, such as the real line or unit interval, to two-dimensional spaces, such as the Euclidean plane or unit square. The conditions of the theorem can be relaxed in different ways to obtain interesting classes of functions from one-dimensional spaces to two-dimensional spaces:

- Space-filling curves are surjective continuous functions from one-dimensional spaces to two-dimensional spaces. They cover every point of the plane, or of a unit square, by the image of a line or unit interval. Examples include the Peano curve and Hilbert curve. Neither of these examples has any self-crossings, but by Netto's theorem there are many points of the square that are covered multiple times by these curves.
- Osgood curves are continuous bijections from one-dimensional spaces to subsets of the plane that have nonzero area. They form Jordan curves in the plane. However, by Netto's theorem, they cannot cover the entire plane, unit square, or any other two-dimensional region.
- If one relaxes the requirement of continuity, then all smooth manifolds of bounded dimension have equal cardinality, the cardinality of the continuum. Therefore, there exist discontinuous bijections between any two of them, as Georg Cantor showed in 1878. Cantor's result came as a surprise to many mathematicians and kicked off the line of research leading to space-filling curves, Osgood curves, and Netto's theorem. A near-bijection from the unit square to the unit interval can be obtained by interleaving the digits of the decimal representations of the Cartesian coordinates of points in the square. The ambiguities of decimal, exemplified by the two decimal representations of 1 = 0.999..., cause this to be an injection rather than a bijection, but this issue can be repaired by using the Schröder–Bernstein theorem.
