= Irrational rotation =

Rotation of a circle by an angle of π times an irrational number

Sturmian sequence generated by irrational rotation with theta=0.2882748715208621 and x=0.078943143

An irrational rotation in the mathematical theory of dynamical systems, is defined as a map $f$, as follows:

Let $x\in [0, 1)$ be arbitrary, and let $\theta$ be any irrational number. For $i\in$ {0, 1, 2 ...} define $f^i_\theta : [0,1) \rightarrow [0,1)$ by

$f^i_\theta(x) = x + i\cdot\theta$ (mod 1)

Under the identification of a circle with R/Z, or with the interval [0, 1) with the boundary points glued together, this map becomes a rotation of a circle by a proportion θ of a full revolution (i.e., an angle of 2πθ radians). Since θ is irrational, the rotation has infinite order in the circle group, and the map f_{θ} has no periodic orbits.

Alternatively, we can use multiplicative notation for an irrational rotation by introducing the map

$$f_\theta :S^1 \to S^1, \quad \quad \quad f_\theta(x)=xe^{2\pi i\theta}$$

The relationship between the additive and multiplicative notations is the group isomorphism

$$\varphi:([0,1),+) \to (S^1, \cdot) \quad \varphi(x)=xe^{2\pi i\theta}$$.

It can be shown that φ is an isometry.

There is a strong distinction in circle rotations that depends on whether θ is rational or irrational. Rational rotations are less interesting examples of dynamical systems because if $\theta = \frac{a}{b}$ and $\gcd(a,b) = 1$, then $f_\theta^b(x) = x$ when $x \isin [0,1)$. It can also be shown that $f_\theta^i(x) \ne x$ when $1 \le i < b$.

== Significance ==
Irrational rotations form a fundamental example in the theory of dynamical systems. According to the Denjoy theorem, every orientation-preserving C^{2}-diffeomorphism of the circle with an irrational rotation number θ is topologically conjugate to f_{θ}. An irrational rotation is a measure-preserving ergodic transformation, but it is not mixing. The Poincaré map for the dynamical system associated with the Kronecker foliation on a torus with angle θ> is the irrational rotation by θ. C*-algebras associated with irrational rotations, known as irrational rotation algebras, have been extensively studied.

== Properties ==
- If θ is irrational, then the orbit of any element of [0, 1] under the rotation f_{θ} is dense in [0, 1). Therefore, irrational rotations are topologically transitive.
- Irrational (and rational) rotations are not topologically mixing.
- Irrational rotations are uniquely ergodic, with the Lebesgue measure serving as the unique invariant probability measure.
- Suppose [a, b] ⊂ [0, 1). Since f_{θ} is ergodic,
  $\text{lim} _ {N \to \infty} \frac{1}{N} \sum_{n=0}^{N-1} \chi_{[a,b)}(f_\theta ^n (t))=b-a$.

== Generalizations ==
- Circle rotations are examples of group translations.
- For a general orientation preserving homomorphism f of S^{1} to itself we call a homeomorphism $F:\mathbb{R}\to \mathbb{R}$ a lift of f if $\pi \circ F=f \circ \pi$ where $\pi (t)=t \bmod 1$.
- The circle rotation can be thought of as a subdivision of a circle into two parts, which are then exchanged with each other. A subdivision into more than two parts, which are then permuted with one-another, is called an interval exchange transformation.
- Rigid rotations of compact groups effectively behave like circle rotations; the invariant measure is the Haar measure.

== Applications ==
- Skew Products over Rotations of the Circle: In 1969 William A. Veech constructed examples of minimal and not uniquely ergodic dynamical systems as follows: "Take two copies of the unit circle and mark off segment J of length 2πα in the counterclockwise direction on each one with endpoint at 0. Now take θ irrational and consider the following dynamical system. Start with a point p, say in the first circle. Rotate counterclockwise by 2πθ until the first time the orbit lands in J; then switch to the corresponding point in the second circle, rotate by 2πθ until the first time the point lands in J; switch back to the first circle and so forth. Veech showed that if θ is irrational, then there exists irrational α for which this system is minimal and the Lebesgue measure is not uniquely ergodic."

== See also ==
- Bernoulli map
- Modular arithmetic
- Siegel disc
- Toeplitz algebra
- Phase locking (circle map)
- Weyl sequence
