= Volterra's function =

Differentiable function whose derivative is not Riemann integrable

The first three steps in the construction of Volterra's function.

In mathematics, Volterra's function, named for Vito Volterra, is a real-valued function V defined on the real line R with the following curious combination of properties:

- V is differentiable everywhere
- The derivative V ′ is bounded everywhere
- The derivative is not Riemann-integrable.

== Definition and construction ==
The function is defined by making use of the Smith–Volterra–Cantor set and an infinite number or "copies" of sections of the function defined by

$$f(x) = \begin{cases} x^2 \sin(1/x), & x \ne 0 \\ 0, & x = 0.\end{cases}$$

The construction of V begins by determining the largest value of x in the interval [0, 1/8] for which f ′(x) = 0. Once this value (say x_{0}) is determined, extend the function to the right with a constant value of f(x_{0}) up to and including the point 1/8. Once this is done, a mirror image of the function can be created starting at the point 1/4 and extending downward towards 0. This function will be defined to be 0 outside of the interval [0, 1/4]. We then translate this function to the interval [3/8, 5/8] so that the resulting function, which we call f_{1}, is nonzero only on the middle interval of the complement of the Smith–Volterra–Cantor set.

To construct f_{2}, f ′ is then considered on the smaller interval [0,1/32], truncated at the last place the derivative is zero, extended, and mirrored the same way as before, and two translated copies of the resulting function are added to f_{1} to produce the function f_{2}. Volterra's function then results by repeating this procedure for every interval removed in the construction of the Smith–Volterra–Cantor set; in other words, the function V is the limit of the sequence of functions f_{1}, f_{2}, ...

== Further properties ==
Volterra's function is differentiable everywhere just as f (as defined above) is. One can show that f ′(x) = 2x sin(1/x) - cos(1/x) for x ≠ 0, which means that in any neighborhood of zero, there are points where f ′ takes values 1 and −1. Thus there are points where V ′ takes values 1 and −1 in every neighborhood of each of the endpoints of intervals removed in the construction of the Smith–Volterra–Cantor set S. In fact, V ′ is discontinuous at every point of S, even though V itself is differentiable at every point of S, with derivative 0. However, V ′ is continuous on each interval removed in the construction of S, so the set of discontinuities of V ′ is equal to S.

Since the Smith–Volterra–Cantor set S has positive Lebesgue measure, this means that V ′ is discontinuous on a set of positive measure. By Lebesgue's criterion for Riemann integrability, V ′ is not Riemann integrable. If one were to repeat the construction of Volterra's function with the ordinary measure-0 Cantor set C in place of the "fat" (positive-measure) Cantor set S, one would obtain a function with many similar properties, but the derivative would then be discontinuous on the measure-0 set C instead of the positive-measure set S, and so the resulting function would have a Riemann integrable derivative.

== See also ==
- Fundamental theorem of calculus
