= Arnold tongue =

Structurally stable features in coupled oscillation dynamical systems.

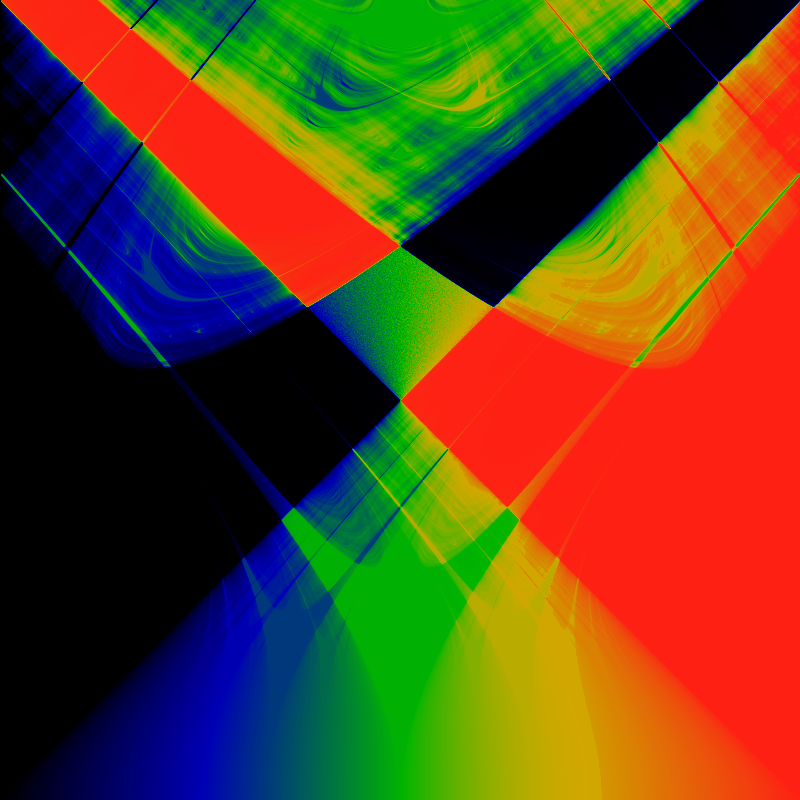
Rotation number for different values of two parameters of the circle map: Ω on the x-axis and $K/2\pi$ on the y-axis. Some tongue shapes are visible.

In mathematics, particularly in dynamical systems, Arnold tongues (named after Vladimir Arnold) are a pictorial phenomenon that occur when visualizing how the rotation number of a dynamical system, or other related invariant property thereof, changes according to two or more of its parameters. The regions of constant rotation number have been observed, for some dynamical systems, to form geometric shapes that resemble tongues, in which case they are called Arnold tongues.

Sometimes the frequency of oscillation depends on, or is constrained (i.e., phase-locked or mode-locked, in some contexts) based on some quantity, and it is often of interest to study this relation.

One of the simplest physical models that exhibits mode-locking consists of two rotating disks connected by a weak spring. One disk is allowed to spin freely, and the other is driven by a motor. Mode locking occurs when the freely-spinning disk turns at a frequency that is a rational multiple of that of the driven rotator.

The simplest mathematical model that exhibits mode-locking is the circle map, which attempts to capture the motion of the spinning disks at discrete time intervals.

Arnold tongues are observed in a large variety of natural phenomena that involve oscillating quantities, such as concentration of enzymes and substrates in biological processes and cardiac electric waves.

== Overview ==
Arnold tongues appear most frequently when studying the interaction between oscillators, particularly in the case where one oscillator drives another. That is, one oscillator depends on the other but not the other way around, so they do not mutually influence each other as happens in Kuramoto models, for example. This is a particular case of driven oscillators, with a driving force that has a periodic behaviour.

=== Example applications ===
As a practical example, heart cells (the external oscillator) produce periodic electric signals to stimulate heart contractions (the driven oscillator); here, it could be useful to determine the relation between the frequency of the oscillators, possibly to design better artificial pacemakers.

The outset of a tumor triggers in the area a series of substance (mainly proteins) oscillations that interact with each other. Simulations show that these interactions cause Arnold tongues to appear, that is, the frequency of some oscillations constrain the others, and this can be used to control tumor growth.

Other examples where Arnold tongues can be found include the inharmonicity of musical instruments, orbital resonance and tidal locking of orbiting moons, mode-locking in fiber optics and phase-locked loops and other electronic oscillators, as well as in cardiac rhythms, heart arrhythmias and cell cycle.

For applications to cardiac rhythms, see Glass, L. et al. (1983) and McGuinness, M. et al. (2004). For applications to synchronisation of a resonant tunneling diode oscillators, see .

== The circle map family ==
The circle map family is a family of dynamical systems in which Arnold tongues appear. They are much simpler than real biological dynamical systems, as well as many others, but despite their simplicity, they exhibit many of the same phenomena that appears in the more complicated dynamical systems. Consequently, they are usually used in studies of the Arnold tongue.

Consider a driven oscillator and a driving oscillator. We use the driving oscillator as an external "master clock", and use its period $T_0$ as the unit of time. Now, suppose the driven oscillator is driven at amplitude 0, that is, suppose that it is oscillating in an unforced manner. Then the driven oscillator oscillates at its unforced cycle time $T$. In other words, its unforced phase velocity is $\Omega := (T_0/T) \;\mathrm{cycle}$ per time $T_0$. In particular, this means that if the driven and the driving oscillators have the same period, then $\Omega = 1$.

Next, we arbitrarily fix two points in the two oscillators' cycles, and call these two points their respective 0-phase points. This then allows us to describe the phase of the system at any point using two numbers $\theta, \phi \in [0, 1)$ modulo 1. For example, $(\theta, \phi) = (0.1, 0.5)$ means the system is in a state in which the driven oscillator is advanced in phase by 0.1 cycles, while the driving oscillator is advanced in phase by 0.5 cycles. Equivalently, the driven oscillator is retarded in phase by 0.9 cycles, while the driving oscillator is retarded in phase by 0.5 cycles. This is why we state that we are taking modulo 1.

Though, to be more accurate, we should say that $\theta, \phi \in \mathbb S^1$, where $\mathbb S^1$ is the circle with circumference 1. We write $[0, 1) \mod 1$ because it is notationally convenient to operate with real numbers.

Now, if we take a periodic strobing snapshot of the driven oscillator every time the driving oscillator reaches its origin, then we obtain a discrete series of phases $\theta_0, \theta_1, \dots$. If there is no driving, i.e. the driving oscillator is completely disconnected from the driven oscillator, then we have
$$\theta_1 = \theta_0 + \Omega, \; \theta_2 = \theta_1 + \Omega, \dots \quad \theta_{i+1} = \theta_i + \Omega$$
More generally, if there is some driving effect, then in our strobing snapshot series, the driving effect shows up as phase delay/advance. The amount of delay/advance depends purely on $\theta$, because of periodicity. That is, if $\theta_i = \theta_j$ for any two $i, j$, then we must have $\theta_{i+1} = \theta_{j+1}$, because the physical system does not change its driving effect strength over time.

Thus, we obtain the form of our circle map:
$$\theta_{i+1} = g(\theta_i) + \Omega$$
where $g$ is a function of type $g: [0, 1) \to [0, 1)$. Each choice of $g, \Omega$ determines a particular circle map. The set of all possible choices of $g, \Omega$ is the circle map family.

=== Arnold's circle map ===
The particular circle map originally studied by Arnold, and which continues to prove useful even nowadays, is:

$$\theta_{i+1} = \theta_i + \Omega + \frac{K}{2 \pi} \sin(2 \pi \theta_i)$$

where $K$ is called coupling strength, and $\theta_i$ should be interpreted modulo $1$. This map displays very diverse behavior depending on the parameters $K$ and $\Omega$.

For example, if both $|K|, |\Omega|$ are small, and $|K/2\pi| > |\Omega|$, then the map has two fixed points, one stable and one unstable. The attractor basin of the stable fixed point is the whole circle, minus the unstable fixed point.

=== Chirikov standard map ===
The Chirikov standard map is related to the circle map, having similar recurrence relations, which may be written as

$$\begin{align}
\theta_{n+1} &= \theta_n + p_n + {\frac K {2\pi}} \sin(2\pi\theta_n)\\
p_{n+1} &= \theta_{n+1} - \theta_n
\end{align}$$

with both iterates taken modulo 1. In essence, the standard map introduces a momentum p_{n} which is allowed to dynamically vary, rather than being forced fixed, as it is in the circle map. The standard map is studied in physics by means of the kicked rotor Hamiltonian.

== Mode locking ==
=== The mode locking diagram ===
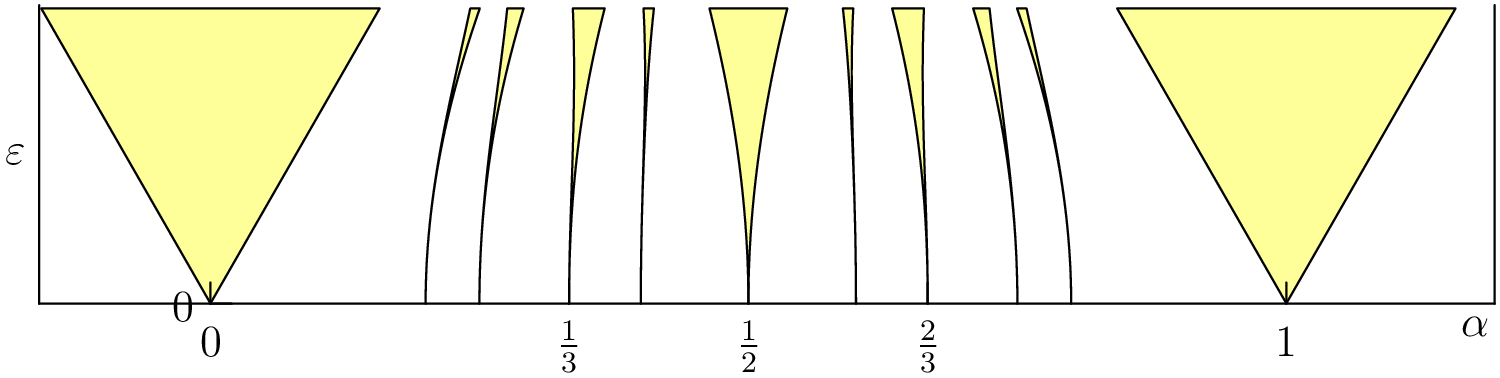
Some of the Arnold tongues for the standard circle map. The x-axis is $\Omega$, ranging from 0 to 1. The y-axis is ε = K/2π, ranging from 0 to 1/2π. Each yellow-colored region is an Arnold tongue, and it denotes a region where the same mode-locking behavior occurs. For example, the yellow triangle apexed at $\Omega = 0, \epsilon = 0$ denotes the region where the driven oscillator mode-locks to rotation number 0. The yellow curved triangle apexed at $\Omega = 1/2, \epsilon = 0$ denotes the region where the driven oscillator mode-locks to rotation number 1/2. And so on.

For small to intermediate values of K (that is, in the range of K = 0 to about K = 1), and certain values of Ω, the map exhibits a phenomenon called mode locking or phase locking. In a phase-locked region, the values θ_{n} advance essentially as a rational multiple of n, although they may do so chaotically on the small scale.

Conversely, in the complement of the phase-locked region, the θ_{n} series never settles into a rational orbit, thus we call it the ergodic set.

The limiting behavior in the mode-locked regions is given by the rotation number

$\omega=\lim_{n\to\infty}\frac{\theta_n}{n}.$

which is also sometimes referred to as the map winding number, or the asymptotic phase velocity.

The phase-locked regions, or Arnold tongues, are illustrated in yellow in the figure to the right. Each such V-shaped region touches down to a rational value Ω = p/q in the limit of K → 0. The values of (K,Ω) in one of these regions will all result in a motion such that the rotation number ω = p/q. For example, all values of (K,Ω) in the large V-shaped region in the bottom-center of the figure correspond to a rotation number of ω = 1/2. One reason the term "locking" is used is that the individual values θ_{n} can be perturbed by rather large random disturbances (up to the width of the tongue, for a given value of K), without disturbing the limiting rotation number. That is, the sequence stays "locked on" to the signal, despite the addition of significant noise to the series θ_{n}. This ability to "lock on" in the presence of noise is central to the utility of the phase-locked loop electronic circuit.

=== Properties of the mode locking diagram ===
By the symmetry of the circle map family, the Arnold tongue diagram is mirror-symmetric across the lines $\Omega = 0$, $\Omega = 1/2$, and $K = 0$. Consequently, it is standard to only plot the vertical half-strip bounded by the 3 lines.

There is a mode-locked region for every rational number p/q.

For every reduced rational number p/q, the width of its mode-locked region grows as $\sim |K|^q$. For example:

- The shape of the mode-locked region above 0/1 is a triangle with straight edges at the lowest order.
- The shape of the mode-locked region above 1/2 is a triangle with two curved edges, each being a parabola at the lowest order.
- The shape of the mode-locked region above 1/5 and 2/5 are both triangles with two curved edges. The width between the curved edges grows as $\sim |K|^5$.

In other words, the largest tongues, ordered by size, occur at the Farey fractions.

For the mode-locked region above 0/1 is exactly solvable. It is a triangle with sides $\Omega = \pm \tfrac{1}{2\pi}K$. The other mode-locked regions do not have closed-form solutions for their shapes, but for small values of $|K|$, we can take a series expansion to obtain their shapes near $|K| = 0$. For example, the mode-locked region above 1/2, to the lowest order, consists of two parabolas of formula $\Omega = \tfrac 12 \pm \tfrac{\pi}{2} (\tfrac{K}{2\pi})^2$.

The mode locking diagram behaves very differently in the $|K|< 1$ and $|K| > 1$ regions.

For any $|K|< 1$ and any $\Omega$, the circle map is smooth and strictly increasing, so for any $n = 0, 1, 2, \dots$, the map $\theta_i \mapsto \theta_{i+n}$ is a strictly increasing diffeomorphism. Thus, starting at any $\theta_0 \in [0, 1)$, we obtain the same asymptotic phase velocity. In particular, this means that the dynamics can mode-lock to at most one mode. Graphically, this means the Arnold tongues do not overlap in this region.

For any $|K| > 1$ the circle map is not monotonic. Thus, for certain values of $\Omega$, the dynamics can mode-lock to two or more modes, depending on the choice of $\theta_0 \in [0, 1)$. Graphically, this means the Arnold tongues may overlap in this region. For the circle map, in this region, no more than two stable mode locking regions can overlap. That is, at most two Arnold tongues can overlap at any point in this region.

In the $|K|< 1$ region, the circle map maps the rationals, a set of measure zero at K = 0, to a set of non-zero measure for K ≠ 0.

Rotation number ω as a function of unforced phase velocity Ω, with forcing amplitude K held constant at K = 1

Fixing a $0 < K < 1$, and taking a cross-section through the diagram, we obtain a one-dimensional fractal with the same scaling behavior as the fat Cantor set. Consequently, its fractal dimension is 1.

Fixing K and taking a cross-section through the diagram, so that ω is plotted as a function of Ω. This gives a "Devil's staircase", a shape that is the same as the Cantor function in terms of its scaling behavior.

It is unknown if there is an upper bound to how many Arnold tongues can overlap for a generic map.

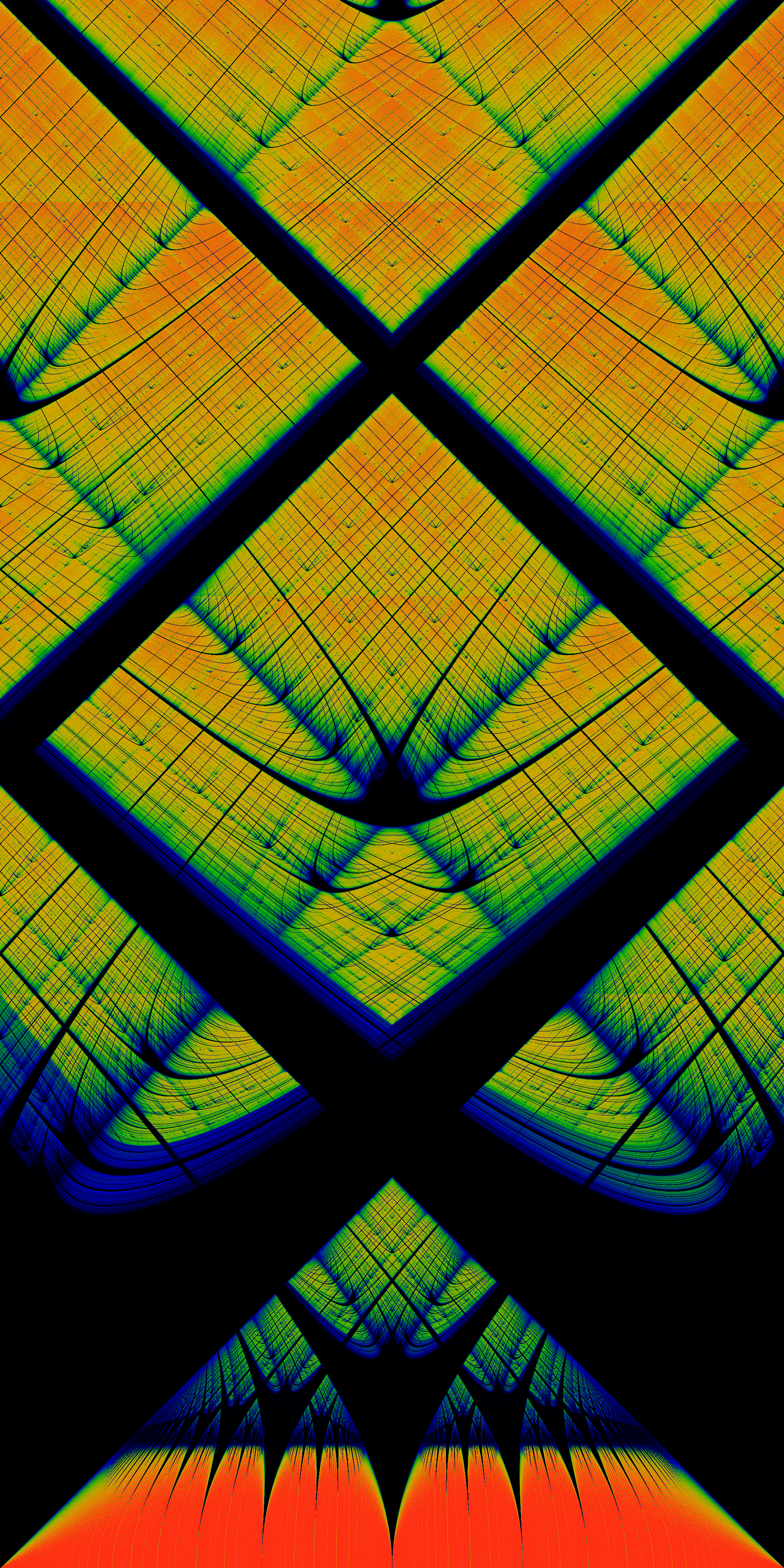
Circle map showing mode-locked regions or Arnold tongues in black. Ω varies from 0 to 1 along the x-axis, and $K/2\pi$ varies from 0 to 2 along the y-axis. The redder the color, the longer the recurrence time.

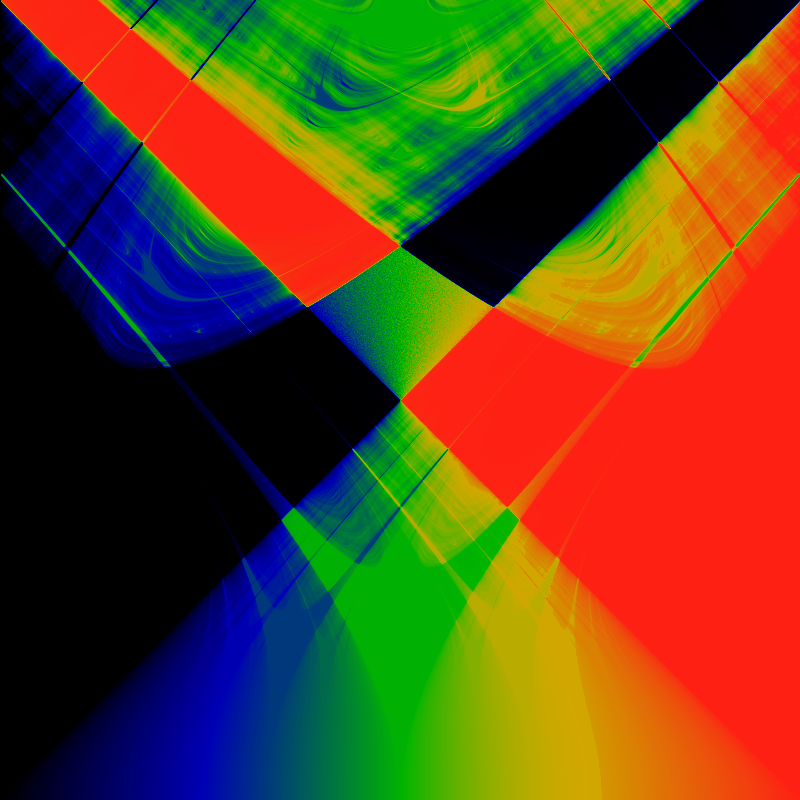
Rotation number, with black corresponding to 0, green to 1/2 and red to 1. Ω varies from 0 to 1 along the x-axis, and $K/2\pi$ varies from 0 to 1 along the y-axis.

== Routes to chaos ==
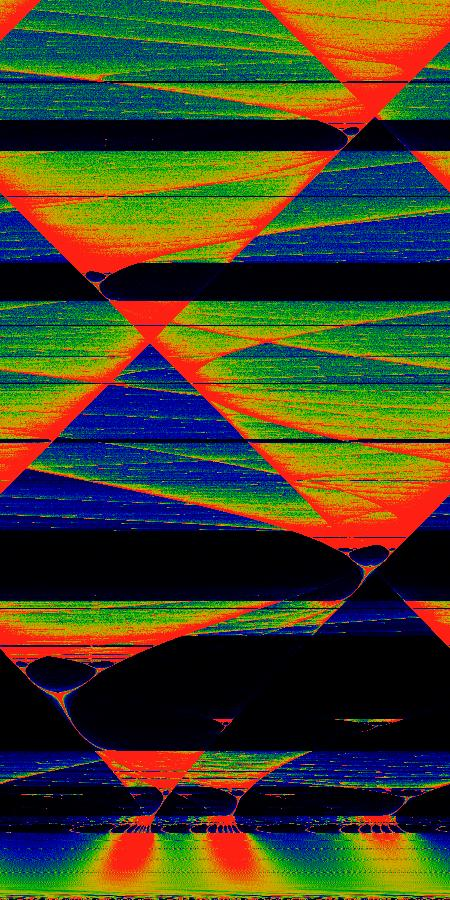
Bifurcation diagram for $\Omega$ held fixed at $1/3$. $K/2\pi$ goes from $0$ at bottom to 1 at top, and the orbits are shown in the interval $[-0.5, 0.5]$ instead of $[0, 1]$. Black regions correspond to Arnold tongues.

As previously described, the behavior of the map is very different for $|K| < 1$ and $|K| > 1$. The $K = 1$ point produces a phase transition.

For $|K| < 1$, the ergodic set (the complement of the Arnold tongues) is also a fractal of fractal dimension 1. But at $K = 1$, the ergodic set becomes a fractal of dimension ~0.87.

If we fix $\Omega = 1/3$ and vary $K$, the bifurcation diagram around this paragraph is obtained, where we can observe periodic orbits, period-doubling bifurcations as well as possible chaotic behavior.

The circle map also exhibits subharmonic routes to chaos, that is, period doubling of the form 3, 6, 12, 24,....

== Other properties of the Arnold's circle map ==
Consider the general family of circle endomorphisms:

$$\theta_{i+1} = g(\theta_i) + \Omega$$

where, for the standard circle map, we have that $g(\theta) = \theta + (K / 2 \pi) \sin(2 \pi \theta)$. Sometimes it will also be convenient to represent the circle map in terms of a mapping $f(\theta)$:

$$\theta_{i+1} = f(\theta_i) = \theta_i + \Omega + \frac{K}{2 \pi} \sin(2 \pi \theta_i).$$

We now proceed to listing some interesting properties of these circle endomorphisms.

P1. $f$ is monotonically increasing for $K < 1$, so for these values of $K$ the iterates $\theta_i$ only move forward in the circle, never backwards. To see this, note that the derivative of $f$ is:

$$f'(\theta) = 1 + K \cos(2 \pi \theta)$$

which is positive as long as $K < 1$.

P2. When expanding the recurrence relation, one obtains a formula for $\theta_n$:

$$\theta_n = \theta_0 + n \Omega + \frac{K}{2 \pi} \sum_{i = 0}^{n-1} \sin(2 \pi \theta_i).$$

P3. Suppose that $\theta_n = \theta_0 \bmod 1$, so they are periodic fixed points of period $n$. Since the sine oscillates at frequency 1 Hz, the number of oscillations of the sine per cycle of $\theta_i$ will be $M = (\theta_n - \theta_0) \cdot 1$, thus characterizing a phase-locking of $n : M$.

P4. For any $p \in \mathbb{N}$, it is true that $f(\theta + p) = f(\theta) + p$, which in turn means that $f(\theta + p) = f(\theta) \bmod{1}$. Because of this, for many purposes it does not matter if the iterates $\theta_i$ are taken modulus $1$ or not.

P5 (translational symmetry). Suppose that for a given $\Omega$ there is a $n : M$ phase-locking in the system. Then, for $\Omega' = \Omega + p$ with integer $p$, there would be a $n : (M + np)$ phase-locking. This also means that if $\theta_0, \dots, \theta_n$ is a periodic orbit for parameter $\Omega$, then it is also a periodic orbit for any $\Omega' = \Omega + p, p \in \mathbb{N}$.

To see this, note that the recurrence relation in property 2 would become:

$$\begin{align}
\theta_n' &= \theta_0 + n \Omega' + \frac{K}{2 \pi} \sum_{i = 0}^n \sin(2 \pi \theta_i) \\
&= \theta_0 + n (\Omega + p) + \frac{K}{2 \pi} \sum_{i = 0}^n \sin(2 \pi \theta_i) \\
&= \theta_n + np,
\end{align}$$

so since $\theta_n - \theta_0 = M$ due to the original phase-locking, now we would have $\theta_n' - \theta_0 = \theta_n + np - \theta_0 = M + np$.

P6. For $K = 0$ there will be phase-locking whenever $\Omega$ is a rational. Moreover, let $\Omega = p/q \in \mathbb{Q}$, then the phase-locking is $q : p$.

Considering the recurrence relation in property 2, a rational $\Omega = p/q$ implies:

$$\theta_n = \theta_0 + n \frac{p}{q}$$

and equality modulus $1$ will hold only when $n (p/q)$ is an integer, and the first $n$ that satisfies this is $n = q$. Consequently:

$$\theta_q = \theta_0 + p$$
$$(\theta_q - \theta_0) = p$$

meaning a $q : p$ phase-locking.

For irrational $\Omega$ (which leads to an irrational rotation), it would be necessary to have $n \Omega = k$ for integers $n$ and $k$, but then $\Omega = k / n$ and $\Omega$ is rational, which contradicts the initial hypothesis.

=== Deriving the circle map ===
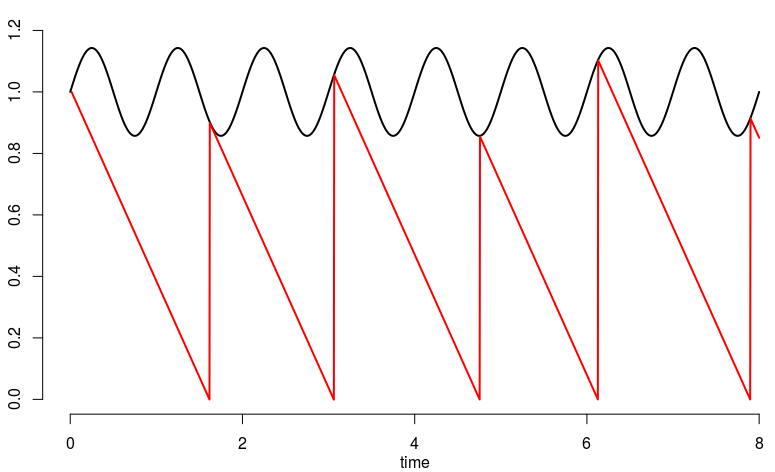
Depiction of the simple model where the circle map arises 'naturally'. The red line is $y(t)$ and is reset to the sinusoidal black line every time it reaches zero.

Another way to view the circle map is as follows. Consider a function $y(t)$ that decreases linearly with slope $a$. Once it reaches zero, its value is reset to a certain oscillating value, described by a function $z(t) = c + b \sin(2 \pi t)$. We are now interested in the sequence of times $\{ t_n \}$ at which y(t) reaches zero.

This model tells us that at time $t_{n-1}$ it is valid that $y(t_{n-1}) = c + b \sin(2 \pi t_{n-1})$. From this point, $y$ will then decrease linearly until $t_n$, where the function $y$ is zero, thus yielding:

$$\begin{align}
0 &= y(t_{n-1}) - a \cdot (t_{n} - t_{n-1}) \\[0.5em]
0 &= \left[ c + b \sin(2 \pi t_{n-1}) \right] - a t_n + a t_{n-1} \\[0.5em]
t_n &= \frac{1}{a} \left[ c + b \sin(2 \pi t_{n-1}) \right] + t_{n-1} \\[0.5em]
t_n &= t_{n-1} + \frac{c}{a} + \frac{b}{a} \sin(2 \pi t_{n-1})
\end{align}$$

and by choosing $\Omega = c/a$ and $K = 2 \pi b/a$ we obtain the circle map discussed previously:

$$t_n = t_{n-1} + \Omega + \frac{K}{2\pi} \sin(2 \pi t_{n-1}).$$

Glass, L. (2001) argues that this simple model is applicable to some biological systems, such as regulation of substance concentration in cells or blood, with $y(t)$ above representing the concentration of a certain substance.

In this model, a phase-locking of $N:M$ would mean that $y(t)$ is reset exactly $N$ times every $M$ periods of the sinusoidal $z(t)$. The rotation number, in turn, would be the quotient $N/M$.

== See also ==
- Phase-locked loop
- Kuramoto model
- Sturmian word
