= Osgood curve =

Non-self-intersecting curve of positive area

Example of an Osgood curve, constructed by recursively removing wedges from triangles. The wedge angles shrink exponentially, as does the fraction of area removed in each level, leaving nonzero area in the final curve.

In mathematical analysis, an Osgood curve is a non-self-intersecting curve that has positive area. Despite its area, it is not possible for such a curve to cover any two-dimensional region, distinguishing them from space-filling curves. Osgood curves are named after William Fogg Osgood.

== Definition and properties ==
A curve in the Euclidean plane is defined to be an Osgood curve when it is non-self-intersecting (that is, it is either a Jordan curve or a Jordan arc) and it has positive area. More formally, it must have positive two-dimensional Lebesgue measure.

Osgood curves have Hausdorff dimension two, like space-filling curves. However, they cannot be space-filling curves: by Netto's theorem, covering all of the points of the plane, or of any two-dimensional region of the plane, would lead to self-intersections.

== History ==
The first examples of Osgood curves were found by William Fogg Osgood (1903) and Henri Lebesgue (1903). Both examples have positive area in parts of the curve, but zero area in other parts; this flaw was corrected by Knopp (1917), who found a curve that has positive area in every neighborhood of each of its points, based on an earlier construction of Wacław Sierpiński. Knopp's example has the additional advantage that its area can be made arbitrarily close to the area of its convex hull.

== Construction ==
It is possible to modify the recursive construction of certain fractals and space-filling curves to obtain an Osgood curve. For instance, Knopp's construction involves recursively splitting triangles into pairs of smaller triangles, meeting at a shared vertex, by removing triangular wedges. When each level of this construction removes the same fraction of the area of its triangles, the result is a Cesàro fractal such as the Koch snowflake. Instead, reducing the fraction of area removed per level, rapidly enough to leave a constant fraction of the area unremoved, produces an Osgood curve.

Another way to construct an Osgood curve is to form a two-dimensional version of the Smith–Volterra–Cantor set, a totally disconnected point set with non-zero area, and then apply the Denjoy–Riesz theorem according to which every bounded and totally disconnected subset of the plane is a subset of a Jordan curve.
