= Denjoy–Luzin theorem =

In mathematics, the Denjoy–Luzin theorem, introduced independently by Denjoy (1912) and Luzin (1912) states that if a trigonometric series converges absolutely on a set of positive measure, then the sum of its coefficients converges absolutely, and in particular the trigonometric series converges absolutely everywhere.
