= Denjoy–Riesz theorem =

Theorem in topology

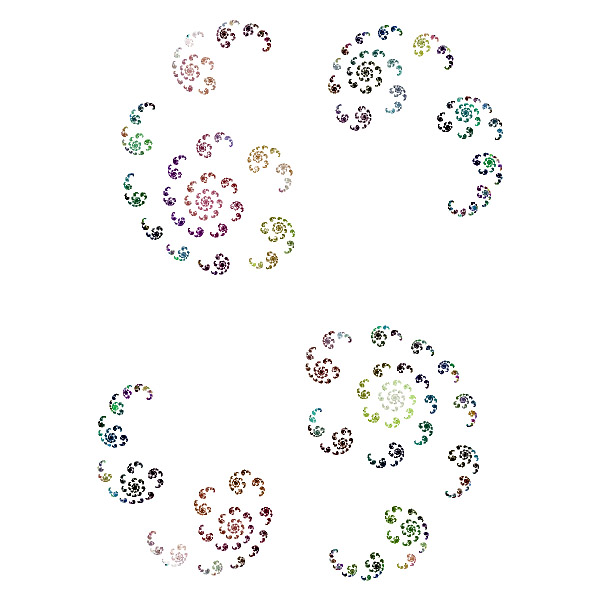
A totally disconnected Julia set. By the Denjoy–Riesz theorem, there exists an arc passing through all the points in this set.

In topology, the Denjoy–Riesz theorem states that every compact set of totally disconnected points in the Euclidean plane can be covered by a continuous image of the unit interval, without self-intersections (a Jordan arc).

== Definitions and statement ==
A topological space is zero-dimensional according to the Lebesgue covering dimension if every finite open cover has a refinement that is also an open cover by disjoint sets. A topological space is totally disconnected if it has no nontrivial connected subsets; for points in the plane, being totally disconnected is equivalent to being zero-dimensional. The Denjoy–Riesz theorem states that every compact totally disconnected subset of the plane is a subset of a Jordan arc.

== History ==
Kuratowski (1968) credits the result to publications by Frigyes Riesz in 1906, and Arnaud Denjoy in 1910, both in Comptes rendus de l'Académie des sciences. As Moore & Kline (1919) describe, Riesz actually gave an incorrect argument that every totally disconnected set in the plane is a subset of a Jordan arc. This generalized a previous result of L. Zoretti, which used a more general class of sets than Jordan arcs, but Zoretti found a flaw in Riesz's proof: it incorrectly presumed that one-dimensional projections of totally disconnected sets remained totally disconnected. Then, Denjoy (citing neither Zoretti nor Riesz) claimed a proof of Riesz's theorem, with little detail. Moore and Kline state and prove a generalization that completely characterizes the subsets of the plane that can be subsets of Jordan arcs, and that includes the Denjoy–Riesz theorem as a special case.

== Applications and related results ==
By applying this theorem to a two-dimensional version of the Smith–Volterra–Cantor set, it is possible to find an Osgood curve, a Jordan arc or closed Jordan curve whose Lebesgue measure is positive.

A related result is the analyst's traveling salesman theorem, describing the point sets that form subsets of curves of finite arc length. Not every compact totally disconnected set has this property, because some compact totally disconnected sets require any arc that covers them to have infinite length.
