= Khinchin integral =

Definition of mathematical integration

In mathematics, the Khinchin integral (sometimes spelled Khintchine integral), also known as the Denjoy–Khinchin integral, generalized Denjoy integral or wide Denjoy integral, is one of a number of definitions of the integral of a function. It is a generalization of the Riemann and Lebesgue integrals. It is named after Aleksandr Khinchin and Arnaud Denjoy, but is not to be confused with the (narrow) Denjoy integral.

== Motivation ==
If g : I → R is a Lebesgue-integrable function on some interval I = [a,b], and if

$$f(x) = \int_a^x g(t)\,dt$$

is its indefinite Lebesgue integral, then the following assertions are true:

1. f is absolutely continuous (see below)
2. f is differentiable almost everywhere
3. Its derivative coincides almost everywhere with g(x). (In fact, all absolutely continuous functions are obtained in this manner.)

The Lebesgue integral could be defined as follows: g is Lebesgue-integrable on I iff there exists a function f that is absolutely continuous whose derivative coincides with g almost everywhere.

However, even if f : I → R is differentiable everywhere, and g is its derivative, it does not follow that f is (up to a constant) the Lebesgue indefinite integral of g, simply because g can fail to be Lebesgue-integrable, i.e., f can fail to be absolutely continuous. An example of this is given by the derivative g of the (differentiable but not absolutely continuous) function f(x) = x^{2}·sin(1/x^{2}) (the function g is not Lebesgue-integrable around 0).

The Denjoy integral corrects this lack by ensuring that the derivative of any function f that is everywhere differentiable (or even differentiable everywhere except for at most countably many points) is integrable, and its integral reconstructs f up to a constant; the Khinchin integral is even more general in that it can integrate the approximate derivative of an approximately differentiable function (see below for definitions). To do this, one first finds a condition that is weaker than absolute continuity but is satisfied by any approximately differentiable function. This is the concept of generalized absolute continuity; generalized absolutely continuous functions will be exactly those functions which are indefinite Khinchin integrals.

== Definition ==
=== Generalized absolutely continuous function ===
Let I = [a,b] be an interval and f : I → R be a real-valued function on I.

Recall that f is absolutely continuous on a subset E of I if and only if for every positive number ε there is a positive number δ such that whenever a finite collection $[x_k,y_k]$ of pairwise disjoint subintervals of I with endpoints in E satisfies

$$\sum_k \left| y_k - x_k \right| < \delta$$

it also satisfies

$$\sum_k | f(y_k) - f(x_k) | < \varepsilon.$$

Define the function f to be generalized absolutely continuous on a subset E of I if the restriction of f to E is continuous (on E) and E can be written as a countable union of subsets E_{i} such that f is absolutely continuous on each E_{i}. This is equivalent to the statement that every nonempty perfect subset of E contains a portion on which f is absolutely continuous.

=== Approximate derivative ===
Let E be a Lebesgue measurable set of reals. Recall that a real number x (not necessarily in E) is said to be a point of density of E when

$$\lim_{\varepsilon\to 0} \frac{\mu(E \cap [x-\varepsilon,x+\varepsilon])}{2\varepsilon} = 1$$

(where μ denotes Lebesgue measure). A Lebesgue-measurable function g : E → R is said to have approximate limit y at x (a point of density of E) if for every positive number ε, the point x is a point of density of $g^{-1}([y-\varepsilon,y+\varepsilon])$. (If furthermore g(x) = y, we can say that g is approximately continuous at x.) Equivalently, g has approximate limit y at x if and only if there exists a measurable subset F of E such that x is a point of density of F and the (usual) limit at x of the restriction of g to F is y. Just like the usual limit, the approximate limit is unique if it exists.

Finally, a Lebesgue-measurable function f : E → R is said to have approximate derivative y at x iff

$$\frac{f(x')-f(x)}{x'-x}$$

has approximate limit y at x; this implies that f is approximately continuous at x.

=== A theorem ===
Recall that it follows from Lusin's theorem that a Lebesgue-measurable function is approximately continuous almost everywhere (and conversely). The key theorem in constructing the Khinchin integral is this: a function f that is generalized absolutely continuous (or even of "generalized bounded variation", a weaker notion) has an approximate derivative almost everywhere. Furthermore, if f is generalized absolutely continuous and its approximate derivative is nonnegative almost everywhere, then f is nondecreasing, and consequently, if this approximate derivative is zero almost everywhere, then f is constant.

=== The Khinchin integral ===
Let I = [a,b] be an interval and g : I → R be a real-valued function on I. The function g is said to be Khinchin-integrable on I iff there exists a function f that is generalized absolutely continuous whose approximate derivative coincides with g almost everywhere; in this case, the function f is determined by g up to a constant, and the Khinchin-integral of g from a to b is defined as $f(b)-f(a)$.

=== A particular case ===
If f : I → R is continuous and has an approximate derivative everywhere on I except for at most countably many points, then f is, in fact, generalized absolutely continuous, so it is the (indefinite) Khinchin-integral of its approximate derivative.

This result does not hold if the set of points where f is not assumed to have an approximate derivative is merely of Lebesgue measure zero, as the Cantor function shows.
