= Smith–Volterra–Cantor set =

Set of real numbers in mathematics

After black intervals have been removed, the white points which remain are a nowhere dense set of measure 1/2.

In mathematics, the Smith–Volterra–Cantor set (SVC), ε-Cantor set, or fat Cantor set is an example of a set of points on the real line that is nowhere dense (in particular it contains no intervals), yet has positive measure. The Smith–Volterra–Cantor set is named after the mathematicians Henry Smith, Vito Volterra and Georg Cantor. In an 1875 paper, Smith discussed a nowhere-dense set of positive measure on the real line, and Volterra introduced a similar example in 1881. The Cantor set as we know it today followed in 1883. The Smith–Volterra–Cantor set is topologically equivalent to the middle-thirds Cantor set.

== Construction ==
Similar to the construction of the Cantor set, the Smith–Volterra–Cantor set is constructed by removing certain intervals from the unit interval $[0, 1].$

The process begins by removing the open middle 1/4 from the interval $[0, 1]$ (the same as removing 1/8 on either side of the middle point at 1/2), so the remaining set is
$$\left[0, \tfrac{3}{8}\right] \cup \left[\tfrac{5}{8}, 1\right].$$

The following steps consist of removing open subintervals of width $1/4^n$ from the middle of each of the $2^{n-1}$ remaining intervals. So, for the second step, the intervals $(5/32, 7/32)$ and $(25/32, 27/32)$ are removed, leaving
$$\left[0, \tfrac{5}{32}\right] \cup \left[\tfrac{7}{32}, \tfrac{3}{8}\right] \cup \left[\tfrac{5}{8}, \tfrac{25}{32}\right] \cup \left[\tfrac{27}{32}, 1\right].$$

Continuing indefinitely with this removal, the Smith–Volterra–Cantor set is then the set of points that are never removed. The image below shows the initial set and five iterations of this process.

Each subsequent iterate in the Smith–Volterra–Cantor set's construction removes proportionally less from the remaining intervals. Thus, the Smith–Volterra–Cantor set has positive measure while the Cantor set has zero measure.

== Properties ==
By construction, the Smith–Volterra–Cantor set contains no intervals and therefore has empty interior. It is also the intersection of a sequence of closed sets, which means that it is closed. During the process, intervals of total length
$$\sum_{n=0}^\infty \frac{2^n}{2^{2n + 2}} = \frac{1}{4} + \frac{1}{8} + \frac{1}{16} + \cdots = \frac{1}{2}\,$$
are removed from $[0, 1],$ showing that the set of the remaining points has a positive measure of 1/2. This makes the Smith–Volterra–Cantor set an example of a closed set whose boundary has positive Lebesgue measure.

== Other fat Cantor sets ==
In general, one can remove $r_n$ from each remaining subinterval at the $n$th step of the algorithm, and end up with a Cantor-like set. The resulting set will have positive measure if and only if the sum of the sequence is less than the measure of the initial interval. For instance, suppose the middle intervals of length $a^n$ are removed from $[0, 1]$ for each $n$th iteration, for some $0 \leq a \leq \dfrac{1}{3}.$ Then, the resulting set has Lebesgue measure
$$\begin{align}
1 - \sum _{n=0}^\infty 2^n a ^ {n+1} &= 1 - a \sum _{n=0}^\infty (2a)^n \\[5pt]
&= 1 - a \frac{1}{1 - 2a} \\[5pt]
&= \frac{1 - 3a}{1 - 2a}
\end{align}$$
which goes from $0$ to $1$ as $a$ goes from $1/3$ to $0.$ ($a > 1/3$ is impossible in this construction.)

Cartesian products of Smith–Volterra–Cantor sets can be used to find totally disconnected sets in higher dimensions with nonzero measure. By applying the Denjoy–Riesz theorem to a two-dimensional set of this type, it is possible to find an Osgood curve, a Jordan curve such that the points on the curve have positive area.

== See also ==
- The Smith–Volterra–Cantor set is used in the construction of Volterra's function.
- The Smith–Volterra–Cantor set is an example of a compact set that is not Jordan measurable; see Jordan measure § Extension to more complicated sets.
- The indicator function of the Smith–Volterra–Cantor set is an example of a bounded function that is not Riemann integrable on (0,1) and moreover, is not equal almost everywhere to a Riemann integrable function, see Riemann integral § Examples.
- List of topologies – List of concrete topologies and topological spaces
