= Denjoy–Young–Saks theorem =

Mathematical theorem about Dini derivatives

In mathematics, the Denjoy–Young–Saks theorem gives some possibilities for the Dini derivatives of a function that hold almost everywhere. Denjoy (1915) proved the theorem for continuous functions, Young (1917) extended it to measurable functions, and Saks (1924) extended it to arbitrary functions. Saks (1937, Chapter IX, section 4) and Bruckner (1978, chapter IV, theorem 4.4) give historical accounts of the theorem.

== Statement ==
If f is a real-valued function defined on an interval, then with the possible exception of a set of measure 0 on the interval, the Dini derivatives of f satisfy one of the following four conditions at each point:

- f has a finite derivative
- D^{+}f = D_{–}f is finite, D^{−}f = ∞, D_{+}f = –∞.
- D^{−}f = D_{+}f is finite, D^{+}f = ∞, D_{–}f = –∞.
- D^{−}f = D^{+}f = ∞, D_{–}f = D_{+}f = –∞.
