= Louise Fraenkel-Hahn =

Austrian artist

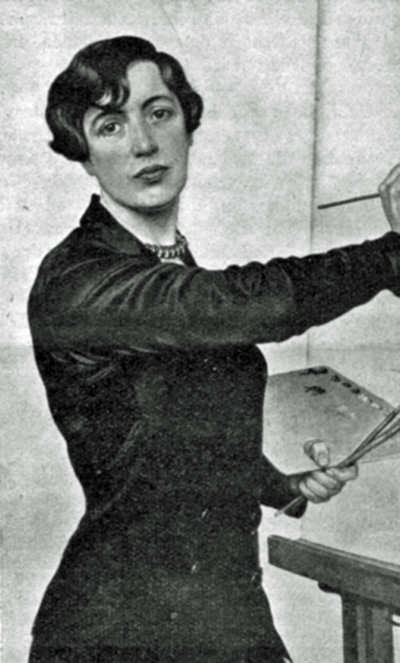
- Born: Louise Hahn; 12 July 1878; Vienna, Austria
- Died: 1939 (aged 60–61); Paris, France
- Known for: painting
- Spouse: Walter Fraenkel (m. 1903)

Louise Fraenkel-Hahn (1878-1939) was an Austrian painter and founding member of the Vereinigung bildender Künstlerinnen Österreichs.

== Biography ==
Fraenkel-Hahn née Hahn was born on 12 July 1878 in Vienna, Austria. She attended the University of Applied Arts Vienna and the Münchner Künstlerinnenverein (Munich Association of Women Artists). In 1902 she traveled to Greece, Italy and France where she was exposed to French Impressionism.

Fraenkel-Hahn was a founding member of the Vereinigung bildender Künstlerinnen Österreichs (Austrian Association of Women Artists, VBKO), and served as its president from 1923 through 1937.

In 1903 she married fellow artist Walter Fraenkel (1879-1943). The couple moved to Paris in the late 1930s.

Fraenkel-Hahn died in Paris in 1939.

== Legacy ==
Her work was included in the 2019 exhibition City Of Women: Female artists in Vienna from 1900 to 1938 at the Österreichische Galerie Belvedere.

== Gallery ==
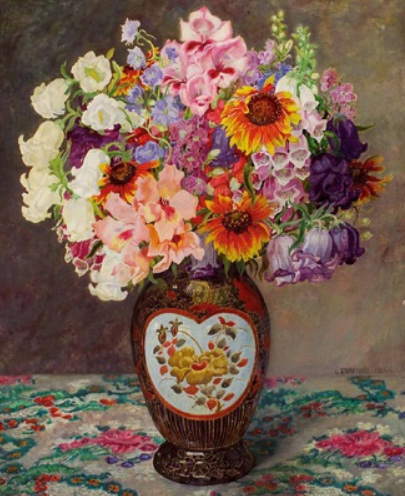
Blumenstrauß in chinesischer Vase

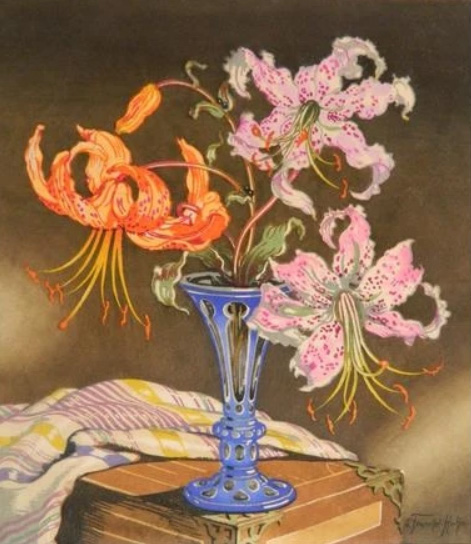
Flowers in a Blue Vase
