= Denjoy–Wolff theorem =

Complex Analysis, Fixed-points and Iterations of Holomorphic Mappings

In mathematics, the Denjoy–Wolff theorem is a theorem in complex analysis and dynamical systems concerning fixed points and iterations of holomorphic mappings of the unit disc in the complex numbers into itself. The result was proved independently in 1926 by the French mathematician Arnaud Denjoy and the Dutch mathematician Julius Wolff.

== Statement ==
Theorem. Let D be the open unit disk in C and let f be a holomorphic function mapping D into D which is not an automorphism of D (i.e. a Möbius transformation). Then there is a unique point z in the closure of D such that the iterates of f tend to z uniformly on compact subsets of D. If z lies in D, it is the unique fixed point of f. The mapping f leaves invariant hyperbolic disks centered on z, if z lies in D, and disks tangent to the unit circle at z, if z lies on the boundary of D.

When the fixed point is at z = 0, the hyperbolic disks centred at z are just the Euclidean disks with centre 0. Otherwise f can be conjugated by a Möbius transformation so that the fixed point is zero. An elementary proof of the theorem is given below, taken from Shapiro (1993) and Burckel (1981). Two other short proofs can be found in Carleson & Gamelin (1993).

== Proof of theorem ==
=== Fixed point in the disk ===
If f has a fixed point z in D then, after conjugating by a Möbius transformation, it can be assumed that z = 0. Let M(r) be the maximum modulus of f on |z| = r < 1. By the Schwarz lemma

$$|f(z)|\le \delta(r) |z|,$$

for |z| ≤ r, where

$$\delta(r)={M(r)\over r} < 1.$$

It follows by iteration that

$$|f^n(z)|\le \delta(r)^n$$

for |z| ≤ r. These two inequalities imply the result in this case.

=== No fixed points ===
When f acts in D without fixed points, Wolff showed that there is a point z on the boundary such that the iterates of f leave invariant each disk tangent to the boundary at that point.

Take a sequence $r_k$ increasing to 1 and set

$$f_k(z)=r_kf(z).$$

By applying Rouché's theorem to $f_k(z) - z$ and $g(z)=z$, $f_k$ has exactly one zero $z_k$ in D. Passing to a subsequence if necessary, it can be assumed that $z_k\rightarrow z.$ The point z cannot lie in D, because, by passing to the limit, z would have to be a fixed point. The result for the case of fixed points implies that the maps $f_k$ leave invariant all Euclidean disks whose hyperbolic center is located at $z_k$. Explicit computations show that, as k increases, one can choose such disks so that they tend to any given disk tangent to the boundary at z. By continuity, f leaves each such disk Δ invariant.

To see that $f^n$ converges uniformly on compacta to the constant z, it is enough to show that the same is true for any subsequence $f^{n_k}$, convergent in the same sense to g, say. Such limits exist by Montel's theorem, and if g is non-constant, it can also be assumed that $f^{n_{k+1}-n_k}$ has a limit, h say. But then

$$h(g(w))=g(w),$$

for w in D.

Since h is holomorphic and g(D) open,

$$h(w) = w$$

for all w.

Setting $m_k= n_{k+1} - n_k$, it can also be assumed that $f^{m_k-1}$ is convergent to F say.

But then f(F(w)) = w = F(f(w)), contradicting the fact that f is not an automorphism.

Hence every subsequence tends to some constant uniformly on compacta in D.

The invariance of Δ implies each such constant lies in the closure of each disk Δ, and hence their intersection, the single point z. By Montel's theorem, it follows that $f^n$ converges uniformly on compacta to the constant z.
