= Arnaud Denjoy =

French mathematician (1884–1974)

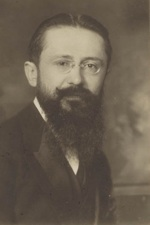
- Born: 5 January 1884; Auch, Gers, France
- Died: 21 January 1974 (aged 90); Paris, France
- Education: École Normale Supérieure
- Known for: Denjoy integral
- Awards: Lomonosov Gold Medal (1970); Poncelet Prize (1930); Peccot Lectures (1912-1913)
- Scientific career
- Fields: Mathematics
- Workplaces: École Normale Supérieure; University of Paris
- Doctoral advisor: René-Louis Baire
- Doctoral students: Gustave Choquet; Ernest Corominas; Charles Pisot; Badri Nath Prasad

Arnaud Denjoy (French: [aʁno dɑ̃ʒwa]; 5 January 1884 – 21 January 1974) was a French mathematician.

== Biography ==
Denjoy was born in Auch, Gers. His contributions include work in harmonic analysis and differential equations. His integral was the first to be able to integrate all derivatives. Among his students is Gustave Choquet. He is also known for the more general broad Denjoy integral, or Khinchin integral.

Denjoy was an Invited Speaker of the ICM with talk Sur une classe d'ensembles parfaits en relation avec les fonctions admettant une dérivée seconde généralisée in 1920 at Strasbourg and with talk Les equations differentielles periodiques in 1950 at Cambridge, Massachusetts. In 1931 he was the president of the Société Mathématique de France. In 1942 he was elected a member of the Académie des sciences and was its president in 1962.

Denjoy married in 1923 and was the father of three sons. He died in Paris in 1974. He was an atheist with a strong interest in philosophy, psychology, and social issues.

The asteroid (19349) Denjoy is named in his honor.

== Selected publications ==
- Une extension de l'intégrale de Lebesgue, Académie des Sciences, pp. 859–862 (1912)
- Les continus cycliques et la représentation conforme, Bulletin de la Société Mathématique de France, pp. 97-124 (1942)
- Sur les fonctions dérivées sommables., Bulletin de la Société Mathématique de France, pp. 161-248 (1915)
- Introduction à la théorie de fonctions de variables réelles, vol. 1, Hermann 1937
- Aspects actuels de la pensée mathématique, Bulletin de la Société Mathématique de France, vol. 67, 1939, pp. 1–12 (supplément), numdam
- Leçons sur le calcul des coefficients d'une série trigonométrique, 4 vols., 1941–1949
- L'énumération transfinie, 4 vols., Gauthier-Villars, 1946–1954
- Mémoire sur la dérivation et son calcul inverse, 1954, published by Éditions Jacques Gabay
- Articles et Mémoires, 2 vols., 1955
- Jubilé scientifique, 1956
- Un demi-siècle de Notes académiques (1906–1956), 2 vols., Gauthier-Villars, 1957 (collection of Denjoy's essays)
- Hommes, Formes et le Nombre, 1964

== See also ==
- Denjoy theorem (disambiguation)
- Denjoy integral (disambiguation)
- Denjoy–Luzin theorem
- Denjoy–Luzin–Saks theorem
- Denjoy–Riesz theorem
- Denjoy–Young–Saks theorem
- Denjoy–Carleman theorem
- Denjoy–Carleman–Ahlfors theorem
- Denjoy's theorem on rotation number
- Denjoy–Koksma inequality
- Denjoy–Wolff theorem
