= Denjoy–Koksma inequality =

In mathematics, the Denjoy–Koksma inequality, introduced by Herman (1979, p.73) as a combination of work of Arnaud Denjoy and the Koksma–Hlawka inequality of Jurjen Ferdinand Koksma, is a bound for Weyl sums $\sum_{k=0}^{m-1}f(x+k\omega)$ of functions f of bounded variation.

== Statement ==
Suppose that a map f from the circle T to itself has irrational rotation number α, and p/q is a rational approximation to α with p and q coprime, |α – p/q| < 1/q^{2}. Suppose that φ is a function of bounded variation, and μ a probability measure on the circle invariant under f. Then

$$\left|\sum_{i=0}^{q-1} \phi \circ f^i(x) - q\int_T \phi \, d\mu \right| \leqslant \operatorname{Var}(\phi)$$

(Herman 1979, p.73)
