= Denjoy–Luzin–Saks theorem =

In mathematics, the Denjoy–Luzin–Saks theorem states that a function of generalized bounded variation in the restricted sense has a derivative almost everywhere, and gives further conditions of the set of values of the function where the derivative does not exist. N. N. Luzin and A. Denjoy proved a weaker form of the theorem, and Saks (1937, theorem 7.2, page 230) later strengthened their theorem.
