= List of Egyptian television series =

== A ==
- Al Bernameg
- Al-Gama'a (TV series)
- Al Ostoura
- Abaza
- Al-Tabari

== B ==
- Bakkar
- Black and White
- Bimbo

== C ==
- Cat's Head

== D ==
- Dawa'er Hob

== E ==
- El Kabeer Awy

== F ==
- The Family of Mr Shalash

== G ==
- Ghosts of Sayala

== H ==
- Howa wa heya

== I ==
- Illusion and Truth

== K ==
- Kalabsh
- Kalabsh (season 2)
- Khan El-Khalili
- Kingdom of Gypsies

== N ==
- Naseeby We Esmetak

== R ==
- The Return of the Spirit
- Ruby (2012 TV series)

== J ==
- Joe Show

== S ==
- Saturday Night Live bil Arabi
- Saraya Abdeen
- Sohab El Ard

== T ==
- Tamer Wa Shaw'eyyah
- The Man with Five Faces
- The Truth..That Unknown
- Tahqeeq

== Y ==
- The Yacoubian Building (TV series)
