= Baltagiya =

Egyptian slang for hired thugs

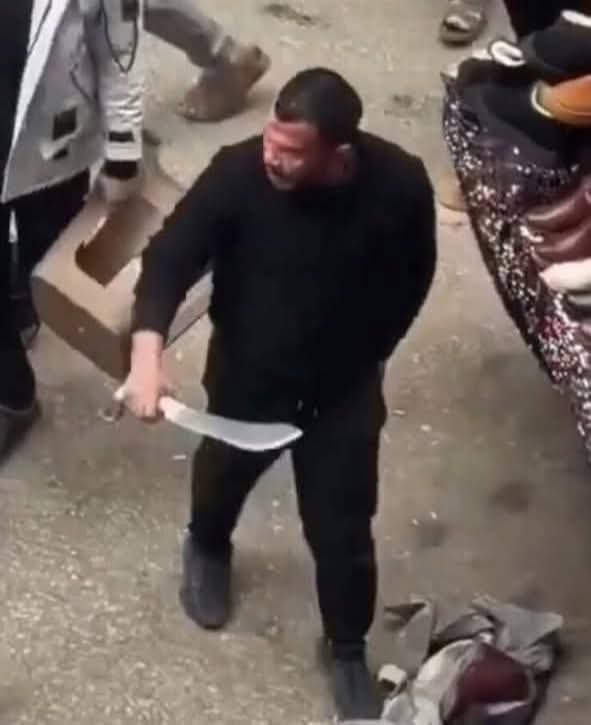
Baltagy

Baltagiya or Baltageya (Egyptian Arabic: البلطجية [bɑltˤɑˈɡej.jɑ]) is an Egyptian slang word that generally means "goons", "thugs", "gangsters" or "criminals", who are hired to attack the political opposition or civic protesters. Meanwhile, "Baltaga" (البلطجة [bɑlˈtˤɑɡɑ]), that etymologically derives from the Turkish word "baltacı" signifying an axeman, means doing harm or participating in collusion against someone or some people. Nonpolitical Baltagiya gangs appeared in Egypt in the 1980s; in the 1990s the Egyptian police decided to hire them, "outsourcing coercion to these Baltagiya, paying them well and training them to use sexualized brutality (from groping to gang rape) in order to punish and deter female protesters and male detainees, alike".

== Recent history ==
A scholar from Cambridge University estimated in 2011 that during Mubarak’s reign, the police informally employed 1.5 million Baltagy and informers.

Amnesty International and other watchdogs bemoaned Baltagiya interference both in the 2005 parliamentary and presidential elections as well as in the 2010 parliamentary elections.

Baltagiya gained international media attention when fighting on the Tahrir Square during the 2011 Egyptian Revolution. In the Port Said Stadium disaster on 1 February 2012, eyewitnesses accused the police of allowing Baltagiya in plain clothes into the stadium with weapons and then not intervening to stop the violence.

Egyptian politician Ahmed Tantawi claimed that his supporters were attacked by pro-government thugs during his campaign in the 2023 Egyptian presidential election.

On 13 June 2025 a group of Baltagiya in Ismailia attacked international activists supporting the Soumoud Convoy trying to reach Rafah border crossing in an attempt to break the Blockade of the Gaza Strip.

Non-official attempts at internet censorship in Arab countries have been named "cyber Baltagiya", as some former street tactics translate into digital strife. Unlike troll farms, which try to manipulate discourse on a given platform, these web Baltagy aim either at the technical breakdown or sudden legal incrimination of oppositional online activities.

== Notable Baltagiya ==
=== Sabry Nakhnoukh ===
He is a leader of Baltagiya who currently runs a private security company called Falcon securities. In the Mubarak era, he was a key player in vote rigging and political repression as well as a procurer.

=== Sayed Al Esawy ===
He was a Baltagy nicknamed the "lion wrestler" due to his alleged fitness, who was known for his involvement in the Tamarod protest laying the political foundations for the mid-2013 ouster of president Morsi by the army. He was paralyzed during a fight and later died from gunshot wounds in a clash with the Muslim brotherhood.

=== The notorious auxiliary camel riders ===
They assisted Mubarak's attempts to crush the 2011 Egyptian revolution and were perceived as an embodyment of Baltagiya.

== Weaponry ==
Baltagiya use blade weapons as well as Molotov cocktails and improvised firearms.

The pocket knife became a symbol of baltagiya, with the Okapi knife being so popular that rapper Ahmed Mekky made a song about it.

== In media ==
The Baltagiya character was depicted many times in Egyptian movies and series to the point of being considered an entire genre. The Baltagy is usually depicted as a villain or an anti-hero, with the most notable works in this genre being:

- Ibrahim Labyad starring Ahmed El-Sakka and Amr Waked
- El Ostoura starring Mohamed Ramadan

In 2011/12, the Egyptian government denounced both political and poverty protest as Baltagiya, with the accused being tried before military courts.

There is an ongoing yet volatile reception of the phenomenon in Western media and academia, from the mid-90s onwards.

== Research ==
- Ghannam, Farha (2012): "Meanings and feelings: Local interpretations of the use of violence in the Egyptian revolution.", in: American Ethnologist 39 (1), pp. 32–36.
- Wahbe, Dina (2020): "A Thug, a Revolutionary or Both? Negotiating Masculinity in Post-Revolutionary Egypt.", in: Middle East - Topics & Arguments. DOI: https://doi.org/10.17192/meta.2020.14.8265.

== See also ==
- Colectivo (Venezuela)
- Futuwwa
- Pemuda Pancasila
- Shabiha
- Titushky
- Triad (organised crime)#Chinese government connections
