= Sarah Elshamy =

Egyptian actress

- کامیار ملکی
- Born: 21 January 1994 (age 32)
- Occupation: Actress
- Years active: 2012–present

Sarah Elshamy (Arabic: سارة الشامي) is an Egyptian actress.

== Life and career ==
Sarah was born in Egypt on 21 January 1994. She has 2 sisters. She joined the academy of arts the higher institute of theatrical arts in 2014. Her first recognized career started working with director Peter Mimi on his series El Ab El Rohy (The Godfather). She had the leading role in the 2019 TV series Ana Sherry Dot Com (I Am Sherry Dot Com) as it was the first digital series in Egypt.

== Filmography ==
=== Film ===
- Karmouz War
- Mousa (2021)
- Mako
- Febrayer El Aswad

=== Television ===
- El Ab El Rohi
- El Khanka
- Kalabsh
- Raheem
- Ana Sherry Dot Com
- Forsa Tania
- Kalabsh 2
- Zay El Qamar
- El Gisser
- Sharbat Louz
- The Assassins
- Face Abook
