= X-Large =

X-Large may refer to:

- X-Large (film) (2011), Egyptian romantic comedy
- X-Large (clothing brand), American streetwear brand
