= Fasel Men El Lahazat El Lazeeza =

2024 Egyptian film

- Arabic: فاصل من اللحظات اللذيذة
- Directed by: Ahmed El Gendy
- Written by: Maha Samy
- Produced by
- Starring: Hesham Maged; Hana El Zahed
- Production company: El Sobky Film Productions
- Release date: 10 April 2024 (Egypt)
- Running time: 122 minutes
- Country: Egypt
- Language: Egyptian Arabic
- Box office: 30 million EGP

Fasel Men El Lahazat El Lazeeza (Arabic: فاصل من اللحظات اللذيذة, romanized: Fasel Men El Lahazat El Lazeeza, English: An Interlude of Delicious Moments) is a 2024 Egyptian comedy film starring Hesham Maged and Hana El Zahed.

== Plot ==
Saleh finds a portal in his house that brings him into an idyllic parallel universe where there are different versions of himself, his wife and his son. After travelling between both worlds, he tries to permanently place himself into the newly discovered universe.

== Cast ==
- Hesham Maged as Saleh.
- Hana El Zahed as Doria, Saleh's wife.
- Jan Ramez
- Taha Desouky
- Mohamed Tharwat
- Bayoumi Fouad

== Reception ==
=== Box office ===
The film reportedly grossed over 30 million Egyptian pounds over the Eid al-Fitr holiday season.
