= Gaafar El Omda =

- Jaafar El Omda جعفر العمدة
- Genre: Drama
- Directed by: Mohamed Sami
- Starring: Mohamed Ramadan; Eman El-Assi; Hala Seddki; May Kassab; Zeina; Menna Fadali; Bayoumi Fouad
- Country of origin: Egypt
- Original language: Arabic
- No. of episodes: 30

Original release
- Release: March 23, 2023

Gaafar El-Omda (Arabic: جعفر العمدة) is an Egyptian drama series produced in 2023, Ramadan 1444 AH, starring Mohamed Ramadan, Eman El-Assi, Hala Sedkki, May Kassab, Menna Fadali, Zeina and directed by Mohamed Sami.

== The story of the series ==
Gaafar el Omda has a group of companies and is very rich but still lives in his traditional neighbourhood where he is also the mayor. He has forbidden his three wives to get pregnant after his son with first wife Suraya was kidnapped, and second wife Daalal was beaten to induce a miscarriage. His missing son haunts him and he looks for him night and day for 19 years. Meanwhile, he falls for a fourth woman, Aida, from an upper-class background, who marries him to get money to help get her dad out of prison. Gaafar must work to win her love while also battling his neighbours, the Fathallah family, who are Dahlal's parents and brothers. He suspects them, and also his older weak-willed brother Sayed, of being the kidnappers, but has no proof. Meanwhile, the Fathallahs hate him because he accidentally killed one of the men of the family, and they all thirst for revenge.

Gaafar befriends a young, fatherless man, Seif - neither of them realise that Seif is actually his kidnapped son. The story comes to a boil when the man paid to kidnap baby Seif returns and the identity of the true kidnapper is revealed.

== Cast ==
- Muhammad Ramadan played a role (Gaafar el Omda)
- Zeina played a role (Aida)
- Hala Sedky played a role (need a maid).
- Ahmed Dash played a role (Seif)
- Iman Al-Assi played a role (Dahlal)
- Menna Fadali played a role (Narges)
- May Kassab played a role (Thuraya)
- Monther Rayahneh played a role (Shawki Fathallah)
- Hosni Sheta played a role (Youssef Fathallah)
- Doaa Hakam played a role (Sabah)
- Essam El Sakka Favorite Ahmed Fahim Follow Favorite
- Bayoumi Fouad played a role (Aida's father)
- Amr el hady played a role (karem fathallah)
- Tariq Al-Nahri played a role (Hamada Fathallah)
- Farida Saif Al-Nasr played a role (Aziza )
- Juri Bakr played a role (Wedad)
- Magdy Badr played a role Follow Favorite.
