= Abdel Rahman Hassan =

Egyptian actor (born 1992)

Abdul Rahman Hassan
- عبد الرحمن حسن
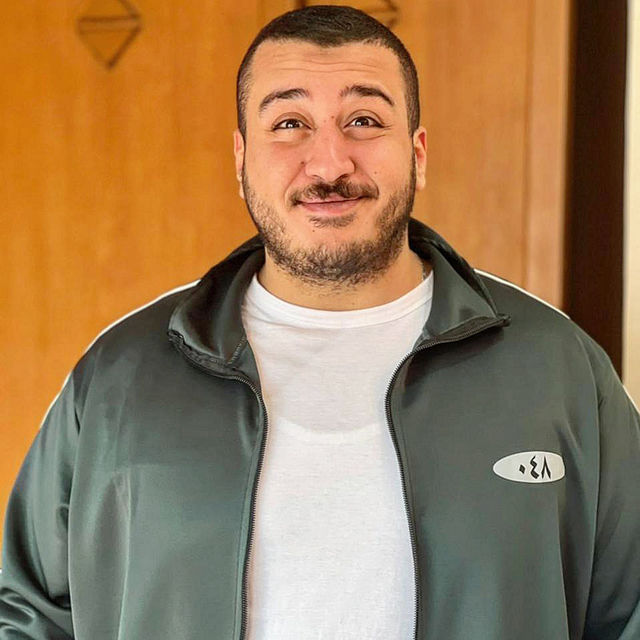
- Abdel Rahman Hassan El Kabeer Awy
- Born: Abdul Rahman Hassan Mahmoud Al-Amrousi; April 10, 1992 (age 34); Cairo, Egypt
- Other names: Tabaza, Zaza
- Citizenship: Egypt
- Education: Cairo University
- Occupations: Actor, comedian
- Years active: 2015–present
- Spouse: Hala Al Shalaqani

Abdul-Rahman Hassan Mahmoud Al-Amrousi (Arabic: عبد الرحمن حسن ) (born in Cairo on April 10, 1992), known as Abd al-Rahman Zaza, is an Egyptian actor.

== Career ==
He graduated from the Faculty of Commerce at Cairo University and began his professional life by acting in plays. He did not intend to become an actor, but a friend made him participate in some auditions in 2015, and he was chosen to present Comedy plays.

He was chosen by director Ahmed El-Gendy to participate in the "‘Men of the House’ series" in 2020 and then the movie "Men’s Pause" in 2021 as well as "El Kabeer Awy" series, Part 6 in 2022 and Part 7 in 2023.

He is known to the public as the character Tabaza in The Big Away series in 2022.

== His works ==
films

- Men's Pause (Film) 2021

series

- The Big One 6 (series) (Tabaza) 2022
- The Big One 7 (series) (Tabaza) 2023
- This Family (series) (Walid) 2022
- Men of the House (series) 2020

Plays He presented several plays, most notably:

- The Astronomer's Play. 2015
- The Peninsula Play.2014
