= Casablanca (2019 film) =

2019 Egyptian film

- Kasablanca
- Directed by: Peter Mimi
- Written by: Hisham Helal
- Produced by: Fathi Ismail; Walid Mansor
- Starring: Amir Karara; Ghada Adel; Amr Abdulgalil
- Cinematography: Hussein Assar
- Edited by: Ahmed Hamdy
- Music by: Amin Buhafa
- Release date: 4 June 2019 (Egypt)
- Running time: 104 minutes
- Country: Egypt
- Languages: Egyptian Arabic; Moroccan Arabic

Casablanca also known as Kasablanka, is a 2019 action thriller film directed by Peter Mimi. The movie revolves around three friends Omar al-Murr, Orabi, and Rashid who form a gang called the "Sea Burglars." Their mission to rob ships. Set against a backdrop of excitement and suspense, the film takes viewers on a thrilling journey as the trio navigates the dangerous world of piracy and heists.

== Plot summary ==
In the context of World War II, the film unfolds in the bustling city of Casablanca. The trio's criminal activities lead them to confront the Mob after a large cargo of diamonds is stolen. As tensions rise and loyalties are tested, the Sea Burglars find themselves entangled in a web of danger and intrigue.

== Cast ==
- Amir Karara as Omar al-Murr
- Ghada Adel as Feefa
- Amr Abdulgalil as Orabi
- Eyad Nassar as Rashid
- Halit Ergenç as Draghon
- Lebleba as Zozo
- Mahmoud El Bezzawy as Joe
- Ahmed Dash as Zakaria
- Ahmed Gamal Saeed
- Bilal El-Tunsi
- Salma Galal
- Mohamed Abdel Sayed
- Ahmed Fahmy (Guest Star)
- Bayoumi Fouad (Guest Star)
- Mustafa Shaaban (Guest Star)
- Nelly Karim (Guest Star)

== Reception ==
Casablanca generated more than 80 million EGP at the box-office, the highest in Egyptian cinema at the time.

Despite mixed reviews, Casablanca garnered attention for its high-octane action sequences and suspenseful plot. The film's portrayal of friendship, betrayal, and daring heists resonated with the audience.
