= Hisham Kharma =

Egyptian music producer and creative director (born 1988)

Hisham Kharma هشام خرما
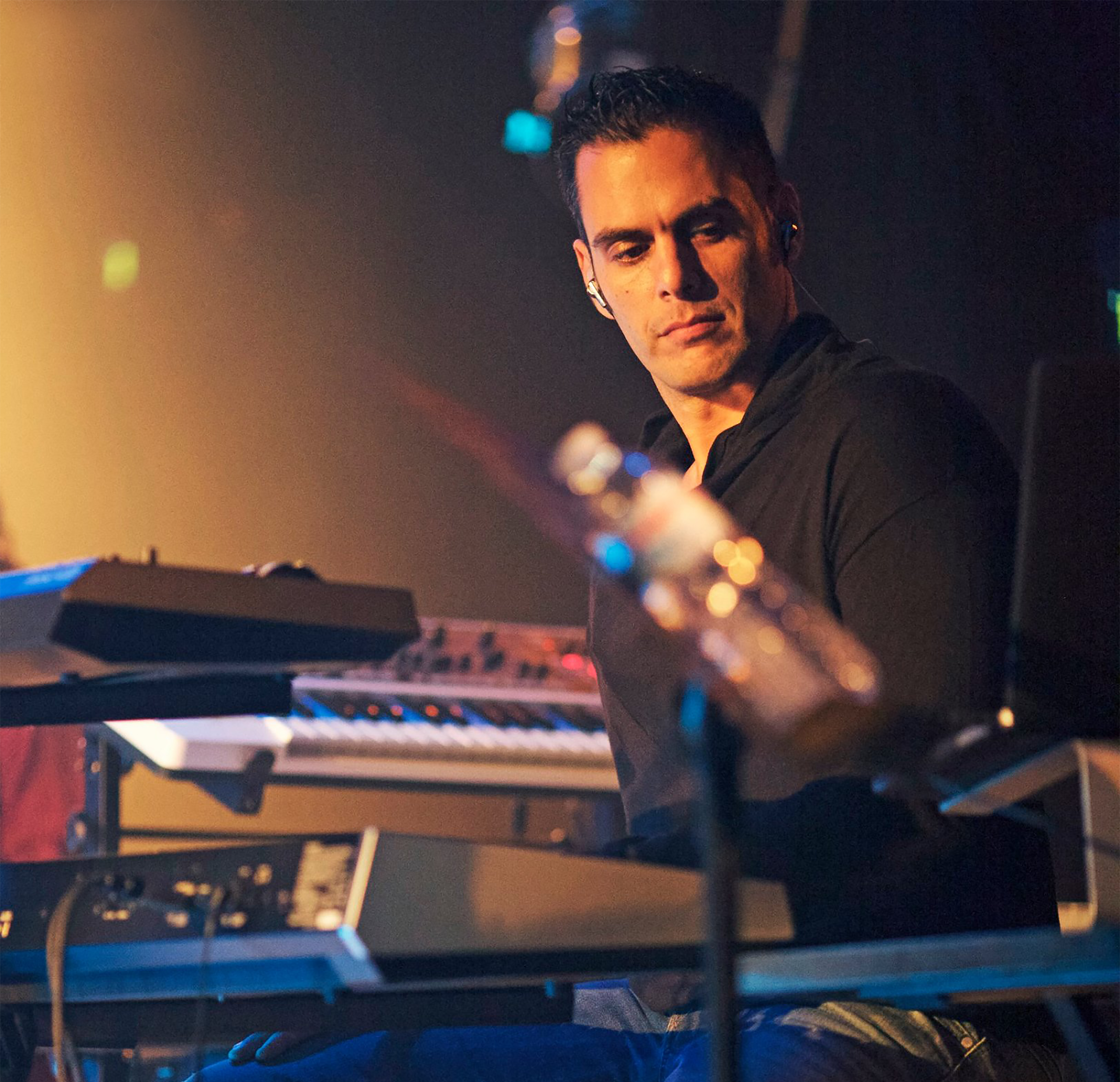
- Kharma in 2016

Background information
- Born: 1988 (age 37–38); Cairo, Egypt
- Occupations: Music producer, composer, creative director
- Instruments: Piano, melodica, keyboard, synthesizer
- Years active: 2010–present
- Labels: Sony Music, Virgin Megastores
- Website: hishamkharma.com

Hisham Kharma (Arabic: هشام خرما) is an Egyptian music producer and creative director. He is known for his live concerts in the Cairo Opera House, his 2012 album AlyaQeen, the soundtrack for The End, and his soundtrack for Egypt: Land of Civilization documentary, which premiered during the Pharaohs' Golden Parade and starred Khaled El Nabawy.

== Early life and education ==
Kharma was born and raised in Cairo. He started playing piano at the age of 9. He obtained his BS in computer science from the American University in Cairo and his postgraduate studies in art direction at Miami Ad School.

== Biography ==
After graduation, Kharma started working in advertising as a creative director. His first work was an ad for Ahl Masr Hospital for Burns. He was granted the title of Humanity Burn FreeAambassador, for the initiative of the Ahl Masr for burns and for composing the music of Shoof B'albak.

In 2010, Kharma released his first official album, The First Voyage, produced by Virgin Megastores. His second album was released by Sony Music Entertainment. He was chosen to represent Egypt on a CD of Sony's series Arabesque with Yanni and Can Atilla. In November 2016, he released his third album, AlyaQeen, consisting of 13 tracks. He had taken about three years preparing for its release. Kharma’s fourth album, Kun, released in 2019, and featured ten tracks.

In 2020, Kharma composed the soundtrack for The End, the first Egyptian sci-fi television drama series. That same year, he composed the soundtrack for Mako, an Egyptian film adapted from the accident of the passenger ship Salem Express, which sank in the Red Sea in 1991.

In 2018, Kharma collaborated with Egyptian composer Omar Khairat, honoring the memory of Sheikh Zayed bin Sultan Al Nahyan and his memorial at 57357 Hospital. In the same year, Kharma composed the soundtrack for the opening and activities of the World Youth Forum held in Sharm El-Sheikh. Kharma collaborated with Tanvi Shah in a recording work titled Born Free.

== Albums ==
- 2010, First Voyage
- 2012, Arabesque
- 2016, AlyaQeen
- 2019, Kun
