= Mohamed Sami =

Egyptian director

- Born: Mohamed Sami; 26 August 1983 (age 42); Cairo, Egypt
- Occupations: Director, writer
- Years active: 2008–present
- Spouse: Mai Omar (m. 2010)
- Children: 2

Mohamed Sami (born 26 August 1983), is an Egyptian director and writer. He is best known for his directory roles of the television series Detention Letter, Regatta and Tisbah ala Khair.

== Personal life ==
He was born on 26 August 1983 in Cairo, Egypt. He had one sister, who died at the age of 25 due to cancer. In 2005, he graduated from Aspen University, Colorado, in business and minored in filmmaking.

He is married to popular actress Mai Omar since 2010. The couple has two daughters, Taya and Celine.

== Career ==
Without a formal education in film direction, he started his career utilizing his passion for art and photography. In 2008, he had his big break when he directed the gladiator-themed music video Enta Tani for Haifa Wehbe. After the video went viral, he was hired to direct video clips for other musicians, including for Sherine and Tamer Hosny. In 2011, with Tamer Hosny as his mentor, he directed his inaugural television series Adam. In 2012, he made his film direction debut with the comedy film Omar & Salma 3, starring Tamer Hosny, Mai Ezz ElDin and Ezzat Abou Aouf.

In 2020, he returned to directing TV series, launching with the Ramadan television series The Prince. In the same year, he signed a three-year contract to create content for Synergy production company. In 2021, he directed the Ramadan drama series Nasl al-Aghrab (The Descendants of the Strangers), starring veteran actors Ahmed al-Sakka and Amir Karara.

== Filmography ==
Year	Film	Role	Genre	Ref.
2011	Adam	Director	TV series	
2012	Omar & Salma 3	Director	Film	
2012	Ma'a Sabq Alesrar	Director	TV series	
2013	Hekayet Hayah	Director	TV series	
2014	Words on paper	Director	TV series	
2015	Regatta	Director, writer	Film	
2015	Ahwak	Director	Film	
2016	The Legend	Director	TV series	
2017	Tisbah ala Khair	Director, writer	Film	
2017	Detention Letter	Director, writer	Film	
2019	Weld Al Ghalabah	Director	TV series	
2020	Mohamed Ramadan: Bum Bum	Director	Video short	
2020	The Prince	Director, writer	TV series	
2020	In the Last Days of the City	Production assistant	Film	
2020	Mohamed Ramadan: Corona Virus	Director	Video short	
2020	Loaloa	Director, writer	TV series	
2021	Outsider Bloodline	Director, writer	TV series	
2021	Mohamed Ramadan: THABT	Director	Video short	
TBD	Al-Ameel Sefr	Director, writer	Film	
