= Kafr Saqr =

- City
- Location in Egypt
- Coordinates: 30°47′47″N 31°37′34″E
- Country: Egypt
- Governorate: Sharqia Governorate

Area
  - Total: 68.8 sq mi (178.2 km^{2})
- Elevation: 36 ft (11 m)

Population (2021)
  - Total: 294,765
  - Density: 4,284/sq mi (1,654/km^{2})
- Time zone: UTC+2 (EET)
  - Summer (DST): UTC+3 (EEST)

Kafr Saqr (Arabic: كفر صقر, lit. 'Village of the Hawk') is a city in the Sharqia Governorate of Egypt. It is one of the oldest centers and the seat of the markaz of Kafr Saqr.

Tilija (تليجه) is one of the important villages of the city.

== Notable persons ==
- Ahmed Subhy Mansour, Islamic scholar, cleric, and founder of the Quranists, who was exiled from Egypt, and lives in the United States as a political refugee.
- Ihab Abdelrahman, an athlete
- Ghada Abdel Razek, an actress

== See also ==
- List of cities and towns in Egypt
