= The Thief (TV series) =

Egyptian TV Programme

- الحرامي
- Story by: Mohammad Barakat
- Starring: Ahmad Dash; Bayoumi Fouad; Rania Yousef; Caroline Azmy
- Country of origin: Egypt
- No. of seasons: 2
- No. of episodes: 20

Production
- Producer: Amir Shawky
- Running time: 13 minutes
- Production company: Amir Shawky

Original release
- Release: 25 July 2020 – 12 August 2021

The Thief is an Egyptian comedy series that premiered on the 25th of July 2020 on the internet for online viewing.

== Plot ==
The series takes place during quarantine caused by the COVID-19 pandemic in Egypt. An unskilled thief robs a house. However, when he tries to escape, the family who owns the house returns. Then the thief tries to hide inside the house so that the family members do not notice him. Then the plot centres around if he can escape.

== Cast and crew ==
- Ahmed Dash
- Bayoumi Fouad
- Raniya Yousif
- Caroline Azmy
- Rana Raeis
- Abdul Rahman Al-Qalyoubi
- Ahmad Fathi
- Tony Maher
- Muhammad Mahran
- Salah Abdallah
- Menna Arafa
