= Menna Fadali =

Egyptian actress and singer (born 1983)

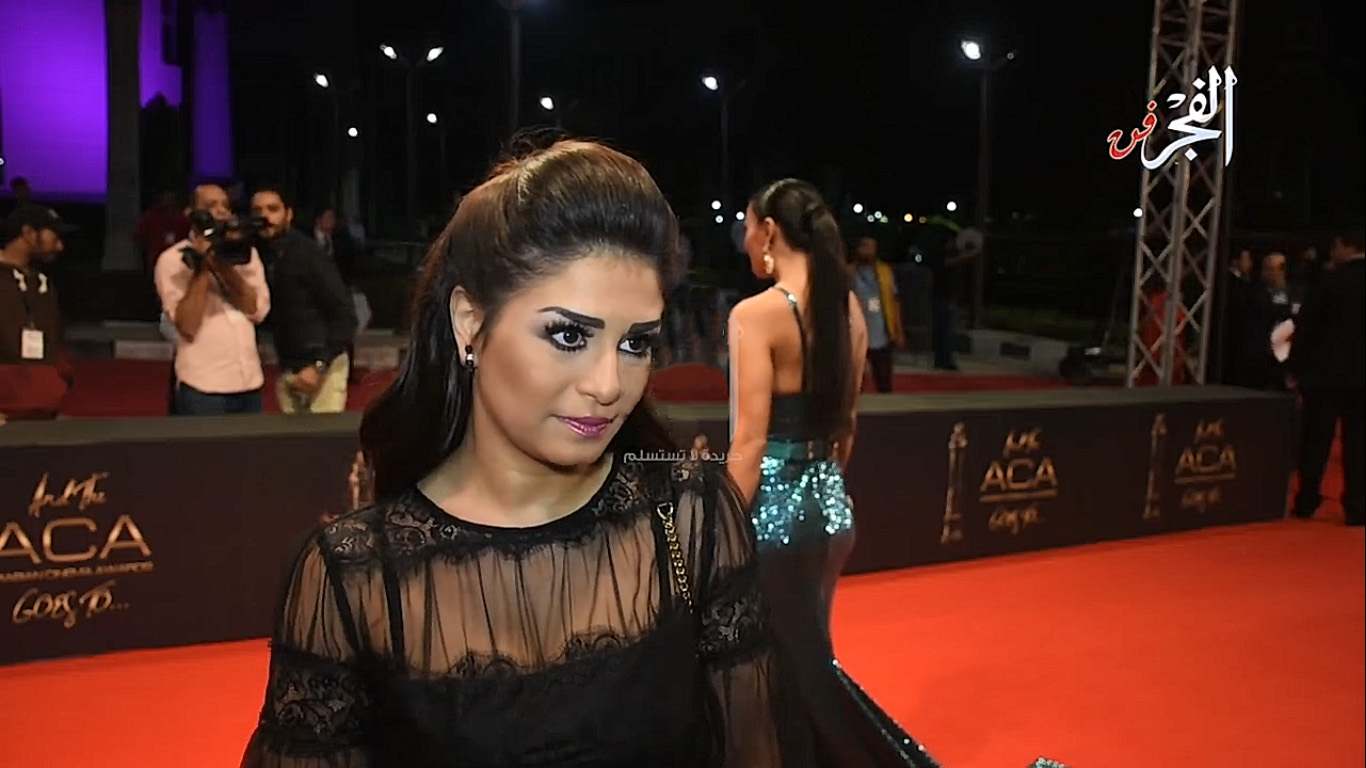
- Fadali in 2017
- Born: September 5, 1983 (age 42); Cairo, Egypt
- Occupations: Actress, singer
- Years active: 2002–present

Menna Allah Samy El-Fadali (Arabic: منة الله سامي سعد الدين عبد المعطي الفضالي; born 4 September 1983) is an Egyptian actress born in 1983. Menna participated in cinema in many of the movies starting with the film El Basha telmiz with Karim Abdel Aziz and Ghada Adel and then "Youth Spicy," "Ghost," and "Vacuum Killer", and "There is No Usefulness" and "Karaoke" and "light eyes" and "The Dealer".

== Career ==
Menna Fadali studied tourism and hospitality, but dropped her studies as she began acting, when she was presented by her mother, who was working as an assistant director to director Majdi Abu Amira, who was impressed by her and assigned her a role in the series Ayana Kalby in 2002. In the following year, Menna participated in the series ‘People in Kafr Askar’ directed by Nader Galal, and in the same year in the series ‘Hamza and five daughters’.

Menna participated in the series 3afaryt Al Siala in 2004 with a lot of stars. Her role was considered a turning point in her acting career, followed by many series such as "It's time," and "market Gravel", "Bird Love", and "El Hilali", with the star," Yehia El-Fakharany ", and" el malek Farouk, " in which she played a unique role as the Queen, also had a series of" October the other, "and the comedy series" The Thief and the book ".

== Filmography ==
- El-Shabah
- El Dealer
- Mako (2019)

== Series ==
- Regheef El-Esh
- Nafeza Ala El-Alam
- Mowaten Bedaraget Wazzir
- Lel Tharwa Hisabat Ukhra
- Aan El-Awan
- Qalb Emra'a
- Lahazat Harega
- Mafesh Fayda
- Sekket EL-Hilali
- El Malek Farouk
- El-Les Wal-Kitab
- Wesh Tany
- L'excellence – 2014
- Gaafar El Omda

== Songs ==
- Masria Ana (I am Egyptian)
