= The End (Egyptian TV series) =

Egyptian TV series

- Arabic: النهاية
- Genre: Suspense; Thriller; Science fiction Drama
- Written by: Amr Samir Atef
- Story by: Youssef El Sherif
- Directed by: Yasser Sami
- Starring: Youssef El Sherif; Nahed El Sebai; Sahar El Sayegh; Ahmed Wafik; Amr Abdelgelil; Mohamed Lotfy
- Voices of: Ahmed Jaber
- Theme music composer: Hisham Kharma
- Country of origin: Egypt
- Original language: Arabic
- No. of seasons: 1
- No. of episodes: 30

Production
- Producer: Tamer Morsi
- Cinematography: Hussam Habib
- Camera setup: Karim Ashour
- Running time: 40—30 minutes
- Production company: Synergy Art Production

Original release
- Network: ON TV
- Release: April 24 – May 23, 2020

The End (النهاية, transcribed Al Nehaya or El Nehaya) is a 2020 Egyptian sci-fi television drama series which premiered on ON TV. The series was written by Amr Samir Atef and produced by Synergy Art Production. It was directed by Yasser Sami. It stars Youssef El Sherif, Nahed El Sebai, Sahar El Sayegh, Ahmed Wafik, Amr Abdelgelil.

== Synopsis ==
Set in 2120, the world has been ravaged and left in ruins at that time, an engineer Zain (played by Youssef El Sherif) is trying to counteract the impact of technology on the world, however, everything changes when he meets a robot clone of himself.

== Cast ==
- Youssef El Sherif
- Nahed El Sebai
- Sahar El Sayegh
- Ahmed Wafik
- Amr Abdelgelil
- Mohamed Lotfy

== Reception ==
Israel's Foreign Ministry condemned the series, because it predicts Israel's destruction.
