= Eyad Nassar =

Jordanian actor (born 1971)

- إياد نصار
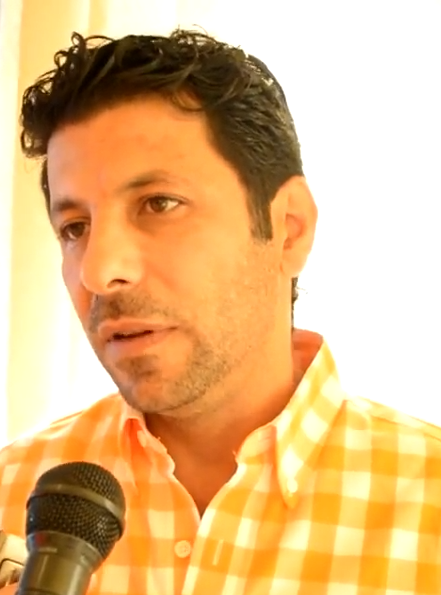
- Born: November 9, 1971 (age 54); Riyadh, Saudi Arabia
- Education: Mutah University
- Occupation: Actor

Eyad Nassar (born November 9, 1971) is a Jordanian actor. He has gained widespread recognition for his roles in Egyptian cinema and television series. Nassar was born in Riyadh, Saudi Arabia and raised in Amman, Jordan.

He voiced the character Basim in the Arabic version of the video game Assassin's Creed Mirage in 2023.

He won the best actor award for his role in the television series Selat Rahem at the Arab Drama Critics Awards in 2025.

== Filmography ==
=== Film ===
Year(s)	Title	Role	Notes	Ref.
2008	Basra	—		
2017	Arrest Letter	—		
2018	Diamond Dust	Sharif		
2019	Casablanca	Rashid		
2019	The Blue Elephant 2	Akram		
2021	Mousa	Dr. Faris Nassar		
2022	Perfect Strangers	Shereef		
2022	11:11	Said		
2023	The Outcasts	Adham		
2025	Project X	Asser		

=== Television ===
Year(s)	Title	Role	Notes	Ref.
2010	Al-Gama'a	—		
2020	Nemra Etnein	—		
2024	Selat Rahem	—		
2025	Muawiya	Ali		
2025	Zolm El Mastaba	Hassan		
2026	Sohab El Ard	Nasser		
