= Ghada Abdel Razek =

Egyptian actress

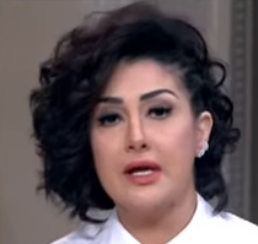
- Ghada Abdel Razek in 2016
- Born: Ghada Mohammed Abdel Razek; 1970 (age 55–56); Kafr Saqr, Sharqia Governorate, Egypt
- Occupation: Actress
- Years active: 1997–present
- Height: 1.77 m (5 ft 10 in)

Ghada Mohammed Abdel Razek (Arabic: غادة محمد عبد الرازق; born 1970) is an Egyptian actress, she began her career in 1997. She acted in many TV series and movies, and won many awards.

== Early life ==
Abdel Razek was born in Kafr Saqr, Sharqia Governorate in 1970. She is the youngest of her two siblings. She has lived for six years in Yemen.

== Career ==
She began her career as a model for advertisements. Her first acting role was in the TV series The thief I love in 1997. Her most famous TV roles were in Hajj Metwali's family in 2001, Mahmood Almasri in 2003, Sons of the night in 2007, Albateneya in 2009, Zahra and her five husbands in 2010, Samara in 2011, With premeditation in 2012, Life story in 2013, The First Lady in 2014, The Nightmare in 2015, Alkhanka in 2016, Land air in 2017, and Against unknown in 2018. She also acted in many movies; her most famous movie roles were in Gamal Abdel Nasser in 1999, About love and longing in 2006, 90 minutes in 2006, Zay alhawa in 2006, 45 days in 2007, Hena maysara in 2007, Master Omar Harb in 2008, Adrenaline in 2009, Fawzia's secret recipe in 2009, Honor crisis in 2009, Shehata's Shop in 2009, Bon suare in 2010, Talk with me, Thank you in 2010, Reklam in 2012, Garconira in 2013, Those who are ashamed are dead in 2016, and Karmooz war in 2017.

She won the best actress award in Alexandria International Film Festival for her role in Hena maysara. She won the Murex d'Or award as best Egyptian actress in 2013. She also won the Dear Guest award from Dear Guest magazine as best actress in 2018. She also become a judge for the reality competition television show Arab Casting with Kosai Khauli and Carmen Lebbos.

== Personal life ==
Ghada Abdel Razek was married and divorced multiple times. Her first marriage to Saudi businessman Adel Gazzaz took place when she was only seventeen years old; they divorced in 1994. Her second marriage was to a businessman from Port Said; they divorced shortly afterwards because of their age difference. Her third marriage was to Helmy Sarhan in 2001; they divorced one year later. Her fourth marriage was to producer Walid Al Tabaeyi; they divorced in 2009. Her fifth marriage was to journalist Mohamed Foda in 2011; they divorced in 2015. She has one daughter, Rotana Gazzaz, from her first husband, and she has two granddaughters. Ghada Abdel Razek is known as one of the biggest celebrities who supports Egyptian president Abdel Fattah el-Sisi. On 7 May 2020, Abdel Razek announced that she married the cinematography director Haitham Zenita.

== Works ==
=== TV series ===
Year	English name	Arabic name	Role
1997	The thief I loved	اللص الذي أحبه	Hala
1998	Mice valley	وادى فيران	Hadasa
2000	Women of the world, unite!	يا نساء العالم إتحدوا	Amal
2001	Hajj Metwaly's family	عائلة الحاج متولي	Neemat alah
2001	Evening market	سوق العصر	Shawq
2001	Beni Helal biography	السيرة الهلالية	Princess Alyaa bent ghanem
2001	The women are coming	النساء قادمون	Amal
2002	Egyptian papers 2	أوراق مصرية 2	Nahed Rashad
2003	A matter of principle	مسألة مبدأ	Lamis
2003	Tomorrow is another day	غداً يوم آخر	
2004	Mahmood Almasry	محمود المصري	Cleo
2004	Batta and her sisters	بطة وأخواتها	Batta
2006	Those who are ashamed are dead	اللي اختشوا ماتوا	Hasnat
2007	Sons of the night	اولاد الليل	
2008	The road of fear	طريق الخوف	Farida
2008	The crocodile bird	طائر التمساح	Maysara
2009	Albateneya	الباطنية	Warda Bashendi
2009	Almaraghi law	قانون المراغي	Saffeya
2010	Zahra and her five husbands	زهرة وأزواجها الخمسة	Zahra
2011	Samara	سمارة	Samara
2012	With premeditation	مع سبق الاصرار	Farida Tobji
2013	Hayat's story	حكاية حياة	Hayat
2014	The First Lady	السيدة الأولى	Maryam
2015	The nightmare	الكابوس	Mushera
2016	Alkhanka	الخانكة	Amira
2017	Land air	أرض جو	Salma
2018	Against unknown	ضد مجهول	Nada
2019	Mura story	حدوتة مرة	Mura
2020	Sultana Al Moez	سلطانة المعز	Sultana
2021	Ghazal's Meat	لحم غزال	Ghazal
2023	The Third of Three	تلت التلاتة	Farida, Feryal, Farah
2023	It Actually Happened – Low Blow	حدث بالفعل – حكاية تحت الحزام	Alia

=== Radio Series ===
Year	English name	Arabic name
2007	The forty way	درب الأربعين
2008	I love you crazy	بحبك يا مجنونة

=== Movies ===
Year	English name	Arabic name	Role
1999	Gamal Abdel Nasser	جمال عبد الناصر	Berlenti Abdul Hamid
2000	The red agenda	الأجندة الحمراء	
2000	Woman under control	إمرأة تحت المراقبة	
2006	About love and missing	عن العشق والهوى	Fatma\Batta
2006	Waiter comeback	عودة الندلة	Safy
2006	Zay alhawa	زي الهوا	Engi
2006	90-minute	90 دقيقة	Sherine
2007	Hen Maysara	حين ميسرة	
2007	45-day	45 يوم	Susie
2008	The Baby Doll Night	ليلة البيبي دول	Layla
2008	Master Omar Harb	الريس عمر حرب	Zena
2009	Shehata's Shop	دكان شحاتة	Najah
2009	Honor crisis	أزمة شرف	Thuraya
2009	Fawzia secret recipe	خلطة فوزية	Nosa
2009	Adrenaline	أدرينالين	Dr Manal Abdul Aziz
2010	Bon suare	بون سواريه	Huda
2010	Talk with me, Thank you	كلمني شكرا	Ashjan
2011	The Moon palm	كف القمر	Jamila
2012	Reklam	ريكلام	Shadia
2013	Garconira	جرسونيرة	Nada
2016	Those who are ashamed are died	اللي اختشوا ماتوا	Layl
2018	Karmouz War	حرب كرموز	Zuba
2018	Karma	كارما	Nahla
2019	Camp 2	كامب 2	

=== Stage ===
Year	English name	Arabic name
1997	Hoda karamia	حودة كرامية
2002	Taraeyo	طرائيعو
2009	Orphan house	دار الأيتام

=== TV shows ===
Year	English name	Arabic name	Occupation
2003	Farah Farah	فرح فرح	presenter
2003	cbm	سي بي إم	actress
2004	Stars dish	طبق النجوم	presenter
2008	Raya and Sakina	ريا وسكينة	presenter
2015	Arab casting	عرب كاستنغ	Judge
2016	Arab casting 2	عرب كاستنغ 2	Judge
