= Rocky Elghalaba =

- Directed by: Ahmed al-Gendy
- Written by: Ahmed al-Gendy
- Starring: Donia Samir Ghanem; Mohamed Mamdouh; Bayoumi Fouad; Mohamed Radwan; Mohammed Tharwat
- Production company: El Sobki Film Production
- Release date: 30 July 2025
- Running time: 108 minutes
- Country: Egypt
- Language: Egyptian Arabic

Rocky Elghalaba is a 2025 Egyptian action-comedy film directed and written by Ahmed al-Gendy. The film stars Donia Samir Ghanem, Mohamed Mamdouh, Bayoumi Fouad, Mohamed Radwan, and Mohammed Tharwat. The film was released in Egypt on 30 July 2025.

== Cast ==
- Donia Samir Ghanem
- Mohamed Mamdouh
- Bayoumi Fouad
- Mohammed Tharwat
- Mohamed Radwan

== Production ==
Filming has been completed by late May 2025.

== Release ==
Rocky Elghalaba was released in Egypt on 30 July 2025, and in several other Arabic countries, beginning on 14 August 2025.

== Reception ==
An review from Nile FM wrote "Light, fast-paced and packed with laughs, Rocky El Ghallaba is the perfect escape when you’re having a bad day".

=== Box office ===
On the first day of the film's release, the film made 2.5 million pounds. The film then made 4 million pounds on the third day of the film's release, taking first place at the box office, bringing its total revenue after three days to nearly 10 million pounds. On the fourth day of the film's release, it made 2.4 million pounds, bringing the total grossed by the movie to 14.4 million pounds on the five days of showing. At the first week of the film's theatrical run, it grossed 2 million pounds, bringing the total grossed by the film in its first week in various cinemas to 18,799,226 Egyptian pounds. After 10 days of its theatrical run, the film grossed 2.8 million pounds, bringing the total revenue of the film during its 10 days of showing in cinemas in Egypt to 25.6 million pounds. On the 14th day of the film's theatrical run, it made more than 32 million pounds. After 16 days of the film's run, the film made 1.3 million pounds. After 22 days of the film's theatrical run, it made 809,163. At Saturday, the film reached 1 million pounds.
