= Hana El Zahed =

Egyptian actress

- هنا الزاهد
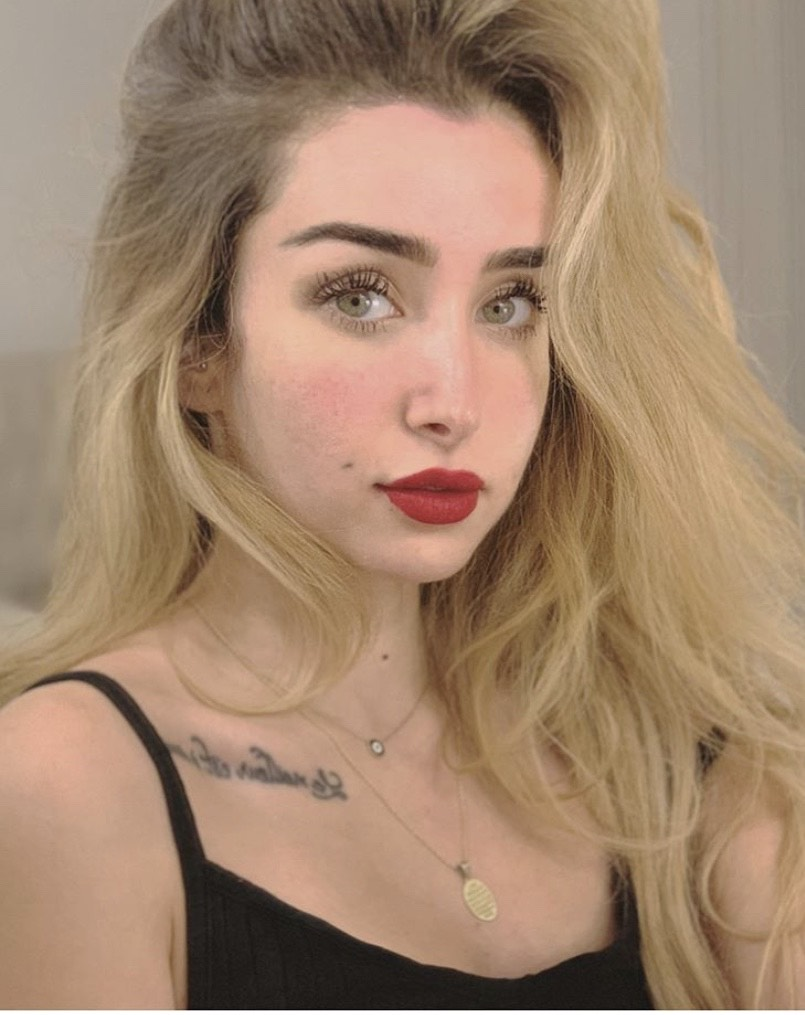
- Born: 5 January 1994 (age 32); Cairo, Egypt
- Education: MSA University
- Occupation: Actress
- Years active: 2003–present
- Spouse: Ahmed Fahmy (m. 2019; div. 2023)
- Mother: Sherine El Manzalawi

Hana El Zahed (Arabic: هنا الزاهد; born 5 January 1994) is an Egyptian actress.

== Biography ==
El Zahed was born in 1994. She made her acting debut in the film Al Meshakhsaty in 2003. In 2009, she starred as the granddaughter of actor Mohamed Sobhi in the TV series Yawmeyat Wanees we Ahfadoh. El Zahed subsequently took a break in her acting career. She described the beginning of her artistic career as not being planned, but came about through pure coincidence.

El Zahed resumed her acting career in the film Jimmy's Plan in 2014. Later in the year, she was cast in Tamer Hosny's TV series Farq Tawqit. In 2015, El Zahed had roles in the TV series Alf Leila wa Leila, Mawlana El-aasheq, and El Boyoot Asrar. The following year, she starred in Al Mizan. In May 2017, El Zahed starred in the TV series Fel La La Land, written by Mustafa Saqr and directed by Ahmed el-Gendy. The series became one of Egypt's most watched on YouTube. She also had a role in the play Ahlan Ramadan. In 2018, El Zahed starred in the film Sons of Adam.

In February 2019, El Zahed played Gamila in the film Love Story. She starred in the TV series El wad sayed el shahat in May, alongside her fiancé Ahmed Fahmy. El Zahed married Fahmy on 11 September 2019 in a lavish ceremony, with Mohamed Hamaki performing his songs. During her honeymoon, she was hospitalized with a stomach virus in Singapore. In 2020, El Zahed starred in the comedy-fantasy film The Washing Machine alongside Mahmoud Hemida. It was directed by Essam Abdel Hamid and takes place in the future. The filming received criticism for taking place amidst the COVID-19 pandemic. In July 2020, she was verbally harassed by men in a truck while driving outside Cairo.

In 2024 Hana El Zahed played main role alongside Hesham Maged in the comedy film Fasel Men el lahzat el lazeeza. The comedy film received great feedback and was a success.

Hana El Zahed was nominated for TC Candler’s “100 Most Beautiful Faces in the World” list for 2026, an achievement she celebrated as an important milestone in her career. She reunited with Tamer Hosny in the 2025 romantic comedy Restart, following their previous collaboration in Bahebak (2022). In 2025, El Zahed also took the leading role of Salma in the Egyptian psychological thriller series Iqama Gabreya. Her other recent film appearances include Project X and 7 Dogs, in which she played Rabab.

== Filmography ==
Films

- 2003: El Meshakhsaty
- 2014: Jimmy's Plan
- 2018: Al-Khawaga's Dilemma
- 2018: Son of Adam
- 2019: Love Story
- 2020: The Washing Machine
- 2022: Ba7ebak
- 2023: Mr X
- 2024: Fasel Men El Lahazat El Lazeeza
- 2024: Asheq (Cameo)
- 2024: Bad3 sa3at fy yaum ma
- 2025: Restart
- 2025: El Shater
- 2025: Project X
- 2026: 7 Dogs

Television

- 2009 : Yawmeyat Wanees we Ahfadoh
- 2014 : Farq Tawqit
- 2015 : Mawlana El-aasheq
- 2015 : Alf Leila wa Leila
- 2015 : El Boyoot Asrar
- 2016: Mamoun we shoraka
- 2016 : Al Mizan
- 2017 : Fel La La Land
- 2018 : Sok ala Khwatak
- 2019 : El wad sayed Elshahat
- 2023 : seeb w ana seeb
- 2025 : Eqama gabrya

== See also ==
- Talaat Zakaria
