= Youssef El Sherif =

Egyptian actor (born 1978)

- يوسف الشريف
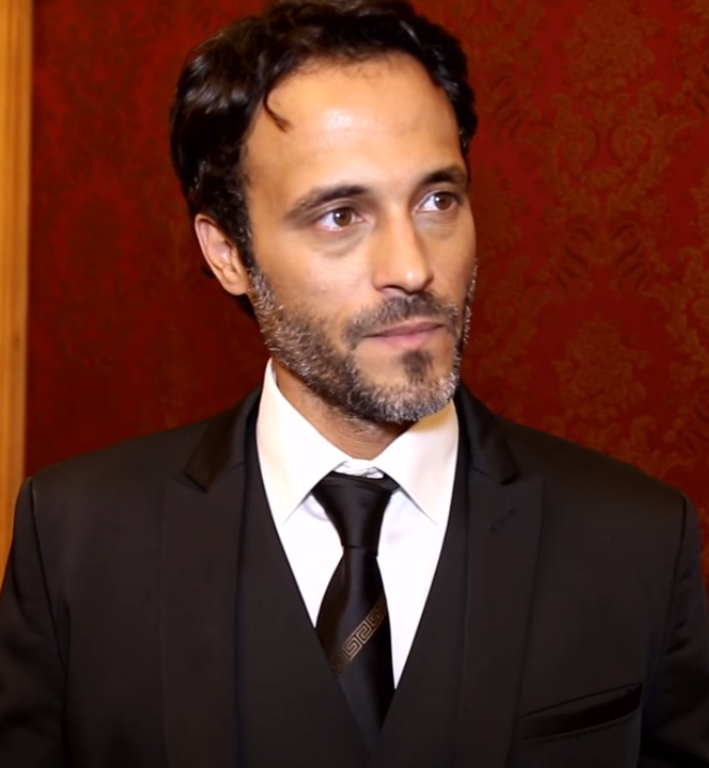
- El Sherif in an interview with Akhbar el-Yom TV
- Born: Mohamed Ismail Naji; 14 September 1978 (age 48); Cairo, Egypt
- Other names: Youssef ElSherif; "El Alamy"
- Education: Ain Shams University
- Occupation: Actor
- Years active: 2003–present
- Works: The Hunter; Kafr Delhab; Unknown Number; Le Chaos; The Sons of Adam
- Spouse: Engy Alaa (m. 2009)
- Children: 3

Youssef El Sherif (Arabic: يوسف الشريف; born September 14, 1978) is an Egyptian actor. His birth name is Mohamed Ismail Naji (Arabic: محمد إسماعيل ناجي).

El Sherif began his career in 2003 in 7 Playing cards. Then he played roles in Open your eyes (2005), On low heat (2005), Agent 1001 (2005), Cinderella (2006) and Halim (2006). He has starred in The End of The World in 2006. In 2007, Director Youssef Chahine chose El Sherif to participate in his last movie before his death, Le Chaos. El Sherif played major roles in several TV series since 2011, firstly Citizen X in 2011, then Private Number in 2012, Temporary Name in 2013, The Hunter in 2014, The Devil's Game in 2015, The Caesar in 2016 and Kafr Delhab in 2017. He returned to the cinema in 2018 with the movie Sons Of Adam. then he missed three years of television drama, but he returned with first Egyptian science fiction television drama series The End in Ramadan in 2020, which Israel's Foreign Ministry condemned the series because it predicts Israel's destruction.

El Sherif collaborated with the writer Amr Samir Atef and the director Ahmed Nader Galal in several works. He collaborated with Atef in Private Number, The Hunter, The Caesar, The Devil's Game, Kafr Delhab, Sons Of Adam and The End. He collaborated with Galal in Private Number, Temporary Name, The Hunter, The Caesar, The Devil's Game, Kafr Delhab and Sons Of Adam. He is also the owner of the idea of several works like The Hunter, Kafr Delhab and The End. In 2009, El Sherif married Engy Alaa, who wrote the story of The Devil's Game. She is also the main fashion designer in most of his works.

== Personal life ==
His birth name is Mohamed Ismail Naji. He was born in Cairo, on September 14, 1978, to a father who works in the army. He played football in the junior team of Al-Ahly, but was injured before his moving to the first team, which kept him off the field. Then he went to work in the advertising field and graduated from the Faculty of Engineering, Ain Shams University, Department of Mechanics in 2002. In 2009, Youssef El-Sherif married the editor-in-chief of Euphoria magazine, Engy Alaa, and they have three children: the twins Abdelrahman and Abdallah as well as Jana.

== Career ==
In 2004, the director Sharif Sabry chose him to act for first time in 7 Playing cards and he chose a stage name for him, "Youssef El Sherif". After that, he participated in Open your eyes, Agent 1001 and Cinderella in 2005, in which he personified the character of director Ali Badrakhan. Until the director Youssef Chahine chose him in 2007 to participate in his last movie before his death, Le Chaos. he participated in the Venice Film Festival and in the 51st session of the London International Film Festival.

Youssef El Sherif stated more than once in television interviews that he places conditions in his business contracts by not providing "steamy scenes". He said: "I don't feel comfortable at all, or find it to be right for me, to have 'steamy scenes', for example, with kissing or holding. I don't feel like it's right from my point of view, I enforce this in my life and on myself only."

== Works ==
=== TV Series ===
Year	TV Series	Name in English	Role
2021	COVID-25	COVID-25	Yassin El Masry
2020	El Nehaya	The End	Zein / Robot Zein
2017	Kafr Delhab	Kafr Delhab	The Doctor Saad / Delhab / Shihabeldinn
2016	El Kaisar	The Ceaser	The Ceaser
2015	Le’bet Eblis	The Devil’s Game	Adham / Selim
2014	El Sayyad	The Hunter	Seif Abdelrahman
2013	Ism Moaqat	Temporary Name	Youssef Ramzy / Mamdouh Dagher / Mourad El Shishy / Ahmed Gharib / Metwally Salama
2012	Zay El Ward	Like Roses	Ali
2012	Rakam Maghool	Unknown Number	Ali
2011	El Mowaten X	Citizen X	Ahmed Kassem (X)
2011	Nour Maryam	Nour Maryam	Nour
2009	Layali	Layali	Moss’ad
2006	Cinderella	Cinderella	Ali Badrakhan
2005	El ‘Ameel 1001	Agent 1001	Essam

=== Films ===
Year	Movies	Name in English	Role
2018	Bani Adam	The Sons of Adam	Adam
2009	El Alamy	The International Player	Malek
2007	Heya Fawda	This is Chaos?	Sherif
2006	Akhr El Donia	The End of The Road	Khaled
2006	Halim	Halim	One of AbdelHalim’s Fans
2005	Fattah Ainak	Open your eyes	Hossam
2005	’Ala Nar Hadya	On low heat	Hesham
2004	7 Warakat Kotshena	7 Playing Cards	?

=== Writer ===
Year	Movies/TV Series	Name in English	Role
2020	El Nehaya	The End	Idea
2018	Bani Adam	The Sons of Adam	Idea
2017	Kafr Delhab	Kafr Delhab	Idea
2016	El Kaisar	The Ceaser	Idea
2014	El Sayyad	The Hunter	Idea

=== TV GameShows ===
Year	TV Gameshow	Name in English	Role
2010	El ‘Ela Teksab	Family Wins	Host
