= Kalabsh season 2 =

Television series

Kalabsh 2 (Handcuff) is a 2018 Egyptian TV-Series, a sequel to Kalabsh, which was aired on the previous Ramadan season. It was directed by Peter Mimi and written by Baher Dewidar. It was one of the most recognized shows during Ramadan season.

A third season was announced to be aired in Ramadan 2019.

== Production ==
Director Peter Mimi previously announced the title of the season would be Pasha Masr" (a title was repeatedly given to Slim Al Ansari by deputy officer Zenaty, it means: Pasha of Egypt, but then they stuck with original Kalabsh. Maya Zaki (Daughter of actress Rojina) worked in the film as in costumes department. The season introduced Haitham Zaki (Son of Ahmed Zaki) as Aref Abu El Ez and Rojina as Leyla El Shimi.

== Overview ==
The season revolves more around the patriot personality of officer Slim El Ansari (Amir Karara), and on subjects like Islamic radical groups such as ISIS, Al-Nusra, along with criticism against their ideology. The 30-episode series was officially well-received by Egyptian police force.

== Cast ==
- Amir Karara: Sleim El Ansari
- Mohamed Lotfy: Ibrahim El-Sunni
- Haitham Zaki: Akef Abu El Ez El Jabalawy
- Abdel Rahman Abou Zahra: Abu El Ez El Jabalawy
- Reem Mostafa: Farida (Slim's wife)
- Ahmed Seyam: Lutfi Abu El-Majd
- Mohsen Mansour: Mahmoud Abd El-Moneim (Houda Saitara)
- Mohamed Mahmoud Abd Al-Aziz: Saeed Al Morsi
- Mahmoud El Bezzawy: Salah El-Tokhi
- Mahmoud Hegazy: Ziad
- Mohamed Marzaban: Hammad (Parliament member)
- Sarah Elshamy: Salma El Ansari (Slim's sister)
- Hala Fakher: Nadia El Ansari (Slim's mother)
- Rojina: Leyla El Shimi
- Soliman Eid: Shaker
- Ahmed Salah Hosny: Adham (Ex-cop and pro assassin)

== Episodes ==
No.	Title
1
The season starts with Slim El Ansari going to his temporary work in Youssef El Seddik Police Station (in Faiyum, Egypt), waiting for the annual police force reshuffle to be announced. He starts work at once, taking a squad for checking point road, all things during the day, but then two cars start to shoot at the police, killing all policemen except Slim and Hussam, his brother-in-law. After inquiries, Slim gets to know the response of the massacre, Abu El Ezz El Jabalaway. Slim decides to take the police force and arrest him, which he has done successfully in a big shootout against El Jabalaway and his associates. The episode ends with a deadly attack on Slim's home.
2
Serious consequences to Slim's family after the attack on their home, his wife and sister die, his mother gets half paralyzed, but the baby was saved. After the funeral, Akef, son of Abu El Ezz El Jabalawy, anonymously calls Slim telling him to wait for more revenge for what he did to his father.
3
Slim looks for a babysitter when Leli shows out and starts to be more interested in Slim's life, she sends a maid to look after Slim's baby. When Slim goes to Amn El-Dawla, he finds Lt. Salah El-Tokhi interrogating an Islamic radical who was present at the massacre, Slim loses his senses and starts beating the man but others succeeded in keeping him away. Then, Slim was ordered to temporarily work in an infamous prison where Abu El Ezz resides.
4
Slim El Ansari visits Abu El Ezz in his cell and threatens him if no cooperation, and then he gets into trouble over his first day of work, first he quarrels with an inmate and fights him, then visit other cells and find out some kind of luxurious lifestyle of two inmates, one of them is a former health minister, so he orders to move them into a regular cell. Salah El Tokhi still in interrogation with Atef, Leli tries to help Slim's family, and Akef doing his business with Islamic militias and other people, also preparing revenge against Slim.
5
While Slim goes deep into the prison work and people, he has a talk with Adham, a professional hitman, and ex-cop. Then, he visits a special prison at his cell, a convicted spy for Israel, and then they have a quarrel. Abu El Ezz's lawyer requests safety measurements to guarantee that Slim won't hurt his client as he threatened him before, and this what Slim will do. The extremist Islamist Atef arrives at the prison, which made Slim goes mad. Prisoner Moussad tries to strangle Slim with a knife. Akef is shown in more than one scene.
6
Moussad tries to strangle Slim, but another prisoner takes the hit and gets hurt badly, then the doctor succeeds in rescuing him. Akef Abu El Ezz people find Arram, who is his father's first hand after he ran away when the police raid happened. Slim's son gets a fever but Samah and Lelia take care of him. In the final scene, Slim goes to Lt. Salah El Tokhi who tells him he has a serious secret.
7
Talks between Salah El Tokhi and Slim El Ansari, as the last can't bear the fact that he can't serve justice for his family free murderers. And another conflict between Slim and the spy prisoner. In a remote area, Akef still on his plans, one of them to free his father while transporting him to the court. The prison prepares for a ride to court with few prisons (but some of them are important figures, also including Abu El Ezz), and Slim, as usual, wants to take care of the process by himself, so he goes just behind them with his own car.
8
Out of nowhere, Akef's heavy-armed people shoot the police cars guarding the prisoner's van, they manage to kill every single one, and then starts to gather the prisoners and killing the useless ones, Slim (with Shaker) – who was just behind them – starts to shoot at all of the gang, he killed some but got many bullets, and all of his associates were dead.
9
Slim is in critical condition in the hospital. Akef sends a message to Slim's mother to let her know that her son is on the verge of death, afterward, she goes to the hospital, but Slim gets better and leaves. In the last scene, Slim goes to the prison and enters Moussad's cell.
10
Slim beats prisoner Moussad hard to get leads of who is responsible for the attack on the police van. Then, Slim goes to Shaker's family at home to give them his condolences. Then, Slim and Salah El-Tokhi start to create a team after the fleeing prisoners and who has done the deadly attack.
11
While Slim talks with El-Tokhi, Akef summons the freed prisoners to tell everyone what he needs from him, also offered big amounts of money. Lt. Youssef El Adawy, who was in office as the prisoner's warden while the attack happened, tries to reveal Shaker (deputy officer who was killed) as a traitor, but Slim doesn't like this idea.
12
Slim feels suspicious of Yousef El Adawi's allegations against Shaker, so he goes to meet him and asks for an explanation, but the meeting puts Slim in more trouble and anger by his superior officer, Salah El Tokhi. Meanwhile, Akef asks the tech hacker Mustafa to spy on Slim's mobile, he also summons former police officer and hitman Adham to kill Shehta and Yousef El Adawi. Adham succeeds in killing the two and then Slim and the police find out.
13
Slim and Salah El Tokhi are looking into evidence on the death of Yousef El Adawi, they go to have a conversation with his daughter and then they check his office finding a flash memory containing an audio recording of a conversation between the criminal Akef and Yousef El Adawi, which revealed that they together planned the prisoners' van incident.
14
Slim still works on getting any leads to find out who is behind the massacre of his family, he tries to track a man called Arram by for help from his friend Jaafar. In the final scene, Slim goes to Abu El Ezz's old house and finds his Thuraya phone, then he dials Akef's number.
15
–
16
–
17
–
18
–
19
–
20
–
21
–
22
–
23
–
24
–
25
–
26
–
27
–
28
–
29
–
30
–
