= Mohamed Lotfy (actor) =

Egyptian actor (born 1968)

- محمد لطفي
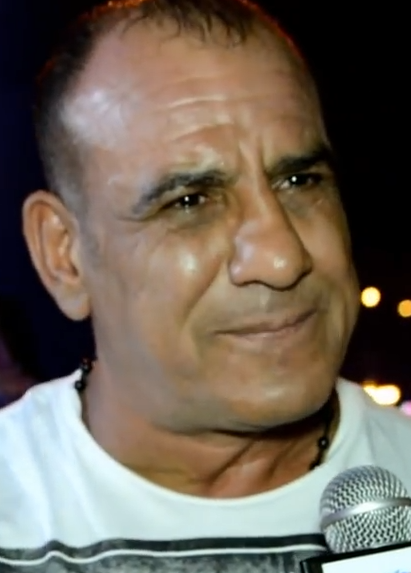
- Born: October 17, 1968 (age 57); Alexandria, Egypt
- Education: Higher Institute of Cinema
- Occupation: Actor

Mohamed Lotfy (born October 17, 1968) is an Egyptian actor.

== Career ==
Mohamed Lotfy is an Egyptian actor who was born in Alexandria in 1968. He studied acting at the High Cinema Institute in Cairo. Lofty began his acting career in cinema with the film Crabs (1990) starring alongside Ahmed Zaki. He has since then appeared in many films in supporting roles including: Why Does the Sea Laugh?, Cabaret, and Hysteria. Lofty has also appeared in numerous television series such as Salt of the Land, Sharaf Fathh El Bab, and El Adham. He’s also well known for known for Messages from the Sea (2010), The End (2020) and Sons of Rizk (2015).

== Filmography ==
=== Films ===
- Kaboria (1990)
- Amrika Shika Bika (1993)
- Hysteria (1998)
- Kazalek fel Zamalek (2002)
- Lost in America (2002)
- El Basha Telmeez (2004)
- Kabareh (2008)
- The Replacement (2009)
- Messages from the Sea (2010)
- Sons of Rizk (2015)
- Pharaoh's War (2019)
- The Spider (2022)
- Their Uncle (2022)

=== Television ===
- Kalabsh (2017)
- Kalabsh season 2 (2018)
- The End (2020)
