= No Surrender (2018 film) =

- Directed by: Peter Mimi
- Written by: Peter Mimi; Mohamed El Sobky
- Starring: Amir Karara
- Cinematography: Hussein Assar
- Release date: June 16, 2018
- Running time: 114 minutes
- Country: Egypt
- Language: Arabic
- Box office: EGP 57,634,545

No Surrender, also known as Karmouz War (Arabic: حرب كرموز) , is a 2018 Egyptian action film directed by Peter Mimi and written by Mimi and Mohamed El Sobky. The film stars Amir Karara, Ghada Abdel Razek, and Scott Adkins and is set during the British occupation of Egypt prior to 1952. The film takes place in a police station in Karmoz, Alexandria, Egypt. It premiered on June 16, 2018.

== Cast ==
- Amir Karara as General Youssef Al-Masry
- Ghada Abdel Razek as Zouba
- Mayan El Sayed as Hind
- Mostafa Khater as Asfoura
- Bayoumi Fouad as Reyadh
- Scott Adkins as "the crazy one"
- Fathi Abdulwahhab as Hamza
- Eman El-Asy as Faten
- Ahmed El Sakka as a judge
