= Bayoumi Fouad =

Egyptian actor

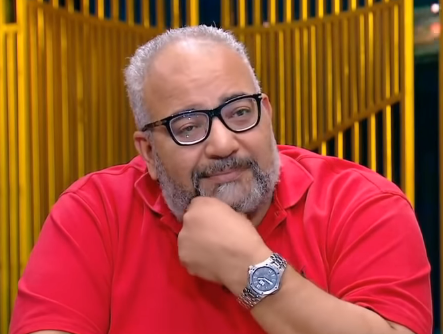
- Fouad in 2020
- Born: Bayoumi Fouad Haddad; June 16, 1965 (age 61); Cairo, Egypt
- Occupation: Actor
- Years active: 2003–present
- Spouse: Amani
- Children: 3

Bayoumi Fouad (Arabic:بيومي فؤاد; born June 16, 1965) is an Egyptian actor.

== Early life ==
Fouad graduated from the Faculty of Fine Arts at Helwan University and was a member of the Atelier Theater troupe. He also graduated from the first batch of the Center for Artistic Creativity, Department of Direction.

== Career ==
After graduation, Fouad worked in advertising for a time before entering cinema with small roles in films such as Instead of Lost and Tell Me Shahrazad in 2009, 678 in 2010, and Asmaa in 2011. Along with this, he worked in television, such as Gates of Fear in 2011, An Unknown Number in 2012, and A Temporary Name in 2013. His fame increased with his participation in the series El Kabeer Awy. In 2013, he participated in the series Heat Wave.

Fouad is considered one of the most famous people who have played the role of a doctor in Egyptian cinema. He has participated in many series, especially in the years 2015, 2016, and 2017, which earned him the nickname "The Joker of Egyptian Drama". In 2021, the films A Men's Stand and Mama is Pregnant earned US$21.7 million (340 million Egyptian pounds) in Saudi Arabia, leading to him being classified as one of the most sought-after actors in the history of Arab cinema.

== Filmography ==
=== Films ===
- 2006: Raqam Qawmi
- 2009: Doctor Silicon
- 2009: Shehata's Shop
- 2009: Badal Faqed
- 2009: Congratulations
- 2009: Scheherazade, Tell Me a Story
- 2010: El Ragol El Ghamed Beslamto
- 2010: 678
- 2011: Cima Ali Baba
- 2011: Samy Oxed El Karbon
- 2011: Bibo and Beshir
- 2011: Asmaa
- 2012: Banat El 3am
- 2012: 30 february
- 2014: Excuse My French
- 2014: Soni'a Fi Misr
- 2014: Jawaza Meeri
- 2014: El Dassas
- 2014: World War III
- 2015: Youm Maloush Lazma
- 2015: Captain Egypt
- 2015: Eyal Harifa
- 2015: Misunderstanding
- 2015: Saykwm Mashkwr Ya Bro
- 2015: Zanqit Sitat
- 2015: Cairo Time
- 2015: 4th Generation 4G
- 2016: Laf w Dawaran
- 2016: Kangar Hubina
- 2016: Kalb Baladi
- 2016: Kidba kwl Youm
- 2016: Amood Faqari
- 2016: Ashan Kharjeen
- 2016: Asal Abyadh
- 2016: Satw Muthalath
- 2016: Hamlat Freezer
- 2016: Hasan W Bqlut
- 2016: Jaheem fi El Hind
- 2016: Ocean 14
- 2016: The Fourth Pyramid
- 2016: The Other Land
- 2016: Abu Shanab
- 2016: Mawlana
- 2017: Yejaalo Amer
- 2017: Horoob Etirari
- 2017: No Trespassing or Cameras Allowed
- 2017: Photocopy
- 2017: Bank Alhaz
- 2017: Bashtery Ragel
- 2017: When Man falls in the swamp of his thoughts
- 2017: Shantet Hamza
- 2017: Good and Prosperous
- 2017: Halimo
- 2017: Remote Control
- 2017: Monkey Talks
- 2018: Nawrt Masr
- 2018: Lelet Hana Wa Sror
- 2018: Qalb Umuh
- 2018: Ali Baba
- 2018: Uqdat el-Khawagah
- 2018: Karmouz War
- 2018: Induced Labor
- 2018: Raghda Motawahisha
- 2018: Diamond Dust
- 2018: Banny Adam
- 2018: El Kwayseen
- 2018: El Abla TamTam
- 2018: Get Out Here For Me
- 2019: The Secret Men Club
- 2019: Mohamed Hussein
- 2019: Casablanca
- 2019: Qarmat Beyitmarmat
- 2019: Back from 2038
- 2019: Wannabe Courageous
- 2019: Doctor Bisbis
- 2019: Khayal Ma'ata
- 2019: Hamlet Pheroun
- 2019: The American Gam
- 2019: The Good, the Evil and the Playful
- 2020: The Thief of Baghdad
- 2020: Saheb Al Maqam
- 2020: The Washing Machine
- 2020: Ghost in Transit
- 2020: Tawa'am Rouhy
- 2020: Vernacular Plan
- 2021: Ahmad Notirdam
- 2021: The Bag
- 2021: Marry Me Again?
- 2021: Dedo
- 2021: Shaw-Ming
- 2021: Waafet Reggala
- 2021: Thanya Wahda
- 2021: Al Ens Wa Al Nems
- 2021: Mom is Pregnant
- 2022: Tamaseeh Al Nile
- 2022: It's An Unimportant Mission
- 2022: Full Moon
- 2022: Fadel and Neama
- 2022: The Mazinger Plan
- 2022: Hashtag Gawzni
- 2022: Tasleem Ahali
- 2022: Taht Tahdid Al Silah
- 2022: The Green Door
- 2023: Shalaby
- 2023: Etnen Lil Egar
- 2023: Akhi Fok El Shagara
- 2023: Ana La Habibi
- 2023: Moughamarat Koko
- 2023: Ba3d El Shar
- 2023: Sugar Daddy
- 2023: Mr. Ex
- 2023: Wish fi Wish
- 2023: Mandoub Mabiaat
- 2025: Rocky Elghalaba

=== Series ===
- 2003: Shabab Online 2
- 2004: Bint Min Shubra
- 2005: Abdulhamid Academy
- 2006: Elandaleeb: People Story
- 2007: Min Gher Maqas
- 2007: Rajil wi Sit Sitat 2
- 2009: Fuash
- 2009: Abouda Marka Musajala
- 2009: Hikayat wi Bineshha - Hala wil Mistakhabi
- 2010: Shahid Ethbat
- 2010: Sanawat El Hub W El Milih
- 2010: Tales to Live
- 2010: Al-Les wal Ketab
- 2011: El Kabeer Awy 2
- 2011: Ehlam Bi Youm
- 2011: Abwab El Khawf
- 2012: Arafa Al-Bahr
- 2012: Taraf Thalith
- 2012: Rakam Maghol
- 2013: Moga Harra
- 2013: Taht el Ard
- 2013: Bedoun Zikr Asma
- 2013: El Kabeer Awy 3
- 2013: Al Ragol Al Enaab
- 2013: Ism Mo'aqat
- 2013: Adam w Gamila
- 2014: WhatsApp Academy
- 2014: Quloob
- 2014: Farq Tawqit
- 2014: Sharee Abd El-aziz
- 2014: Ana W Baba W Mama
- 2014: El Kabeer Awy 4
- 2014: ElAmalya Messi
- 2014: ElSayda El Awla
- 2015: The Diary of a Very Angry Wife
- 2015: Man El Jany
- 2015: Lahfa
- 2015: Lama Tamer Sab Shawqya
- 2015: 3yon El Qalb
- 2015: Roundtrip
- 2015: Ba3d El Bidaya
- 2015: Ana W Baba W Mama 2
- 2015: El Kabeer Awy 5
- 2015: The Nightmare
- 2015: El Biut Asrar
- 2015: Esteefa
- 2016: Heya We Da Vinci
- 2016: Nelly and Sherihan
- 2016: Shehadet Melad
- 2016: Ras Al Ghul
- 2016: Super Girls
- 2016: Al Mizan
- 2016: Al Kef
- 2016: Wedding Song
- 2017: Wlad Tisaa
- 2020: The Thief
- 2020: El Emara
- 2020: Ela Ana
- 2021: Al Jar Lil Jar
- 2021: The Thief 2
- 2021: Tasahel
- 2021: Wlad Nas
- 2021: In Our House There Is A Robot AKA (Fe Baytena Robot)
- 2023: Gaafar El Omda
- 2025: Catalog

=== Radio series ===
- 2014: Azma Nafsya
- 2015: Delivery
- 2016: Min Maaya
- 2016: Tora Bora
- 2017: Baba Valentino
- 2019: Fartoghly Family
- 2020: Adila's Wedding
- 2020: Lughz Maftouh
- 2023: Raas Rajaa wa Salih

=== Plays ===
- 2006: Ahlan Ya Bakawat
- 2007: Men Doun Makas (Without a Scissor)
- 2008: Zaki fi El Wizara
- 2012: Fi Baitina Shabah
- 2014: Wazeer Min El Wizara
- 2015: Egypt Tiatro Third Season
- 2016: Egypt Tiatro Fourth Season
- 2019: 3 Days on the Beach
- 2020: Hazalqoum
- 2020: Happy New Year in Arabic
- 2021: Tis Family
- 2021: Jawaza Miafrata
- 2022: Hata La Yateer El Dukan
- 2022: Jamiaat El Mushaghibeen
- 2022: Anistoona
- 2022: Ahfad Raya Wi Sakeena
- 2023: Ezay Tikhnuq Jarak

=== Animation ===
- 2017: Fully
- 2017: Ramadhan Karin Family 2
- 2018: Dukan Am Fndi
- 2018: Captain Azooz
- 2019: Captain Azooz 2
- 2020: Folanya

=== Programs ===
- 2010: Rubaa Mushakal
- 2012: Rubaa Mushakal Extra Spicy
- 2013: Waseem Hudhud
- 2014: Asaad Allah Masakwm min Jadeed
- 2016: Wesh Al Sa'd
- 2017: Bayoumi Afandi
- 2017: Bayoumi Fanadi 2
- 2018: From Russia With Greetings
- 2019: Elhisn
