= Asmaa Abulyazeid =

Egyptian actress and singer

- أسماء أبو اليزيد
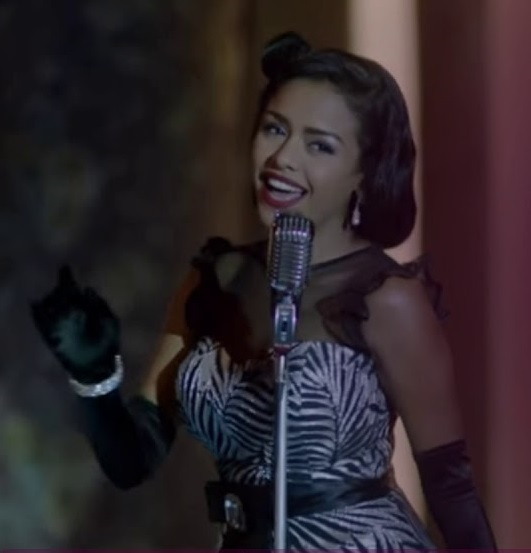
- Born: July 10, 1990 (age 36); Cairo, Egypt
- Occupation: Actress
- Years active: 2011–present
- Awards: Best Actress at Elia Short Film Festival 2019

Asmaa Abulyazeid (Arabic: أسماء أبو اليزيد) is an Egyptian actress and singer.

Abulyazeid drew attention in 2017 through her performance of the character Toka in the TV series "This Evening," participated in many series and films, and also participated in the band "Bahgaga." and presented several monologues in several concerts. She is known for her leading role as Farah in MBC4 American satirical romantic dramedy series Miss Farah (2019-2022), Arabic adaptation of The CW satirical romantic dramedy series Jane the Virgin (2014–2019).

== Early life ==
Asmaa Abulyazeid was born on 10 July 1990 in Cairo, Egypt. Asmaa liked acting from a very young age, but she could not do acting in her school because of the lack of school theater, but she finally got a chance to perform at college from the first year, in the Atelier Theater.

In the "Theater Atelier" she trained under the hands of director Shadi Daly, and participated in a large number of solo performances, the latest of which was the "Magic Mix of Happiness", which competed in the Arab Theater Festival for the "Sheikh Sultan Al Qasimi Award" for the best Arab theatrical show for 2016.

Her first theatrical performance was a presentation of the team in her first semester at the college, under the title "Life is Beautiful in Fine Arts", and in the second semester of the same year, she participated in "Antar Stable", directed by the artist Bayoumi Fouad, to "Atelier" The stage".

In 2014, she participated in the series "I Loved" by Maryam Al Ahmadi, but it was a small role consisting of several scenes.

She was nominated by producer Ahmed Medhat Sadeq, directed by Tamer Mohsen, to perform the role of Toka in "This Evening", and after passing all the tests which led to the role, she was cast as Toka.

She first major film role was influenced by her confidence in the director, who advised her not to feel the role in order to excel. The actress said she loved the role of Toka for her kindness, hospitality and sensitivity but they were different and much stronger than they really are.

Abulyazeid went through the experience as a director by directing the play "Melodrama", in 2013, as "Habhan", as well as assisting the director Shadi Daly in the play "Dream Plastic" in which she then played a role, and "Made in China", and The Revolution of the Dead.

While predominantly doing acting, Abulyazeid has done singing as well. This became known when she performed in Raghm El Masafa (Regardless of Distance) with Masaar Egbary in 2020. However, she had been singing long before that. She was part of the girl band Bahgaga, a women's musical band that presents comedy monologues with oriental tunes. They were established in 2015 and are known for mixing singing with performing. Abulyazeid was one of the five leading singers of the band and she performed with them in several concerts. While she has now left the band to pursuit her acting career, she remains an honorary member of the popular band.

== Filmography ==
=== Film ===
Year	Title	Role	Notes
2021	Mousa	Rika	

=== Television ===
Year	Title	Role	Notes
2019–22	Miss Farah	Farah / Latifa	Lead role; 110 episodes

=== Directing ===
Year	Title	Notes
2021-22	Miss Farah	3 episodes

=== Music videos ===
Year	Title	Artist	Role	Notes
2020	"Ahwak (Al Anisa Farah)"	Abu	Farah	From Miss Farah
2020	"Ya Lil (Al Anisa Farah)"	Ramage	Farah	From Miss Farah

== Awards ==
- Best Actress at Elia Short Film Festival 2019.
