= Hala Sedki =

Egyptian actress (born 1961)

- Born: Hala Sedki George Younan; June 15, 1961 (age 63); Cairo, Egypt
- Occupation: Actress
- Years active: 1979-present
- Notable work: Le Chaos; Alexandrie... New York
- Awards: Best Actress Award from Cairo International Film Festival.

Hala Sedki George Younan (Arabic: هالة صدقى جورج يونان; born June 15, 1961, in Cairo) is an Egyptian actress.

== Career ==
She began her career with the director Nour Al Demirdash in Rehlet Al Melion and has worked in more than 30 films. She has received the Best Actress Award from Cairo International Film Festival.

Sedki has worked on many TV series such as Abyas w Eswed, Awrak Misrya, Arabisk, Zaman Al Aolama and Ynabei El Eshk.

== Filmography ==
=== Films ===
Year	Film	Role	Notes	Ref
	Reaction			
1985	Nos arnab			
1989	The Serpent of Death	Nabila	Credited as Hala Sidki	
2004	Alexandria... New York	Bonnie		
2006	Mateegy norkos			
2007	Young Alexander the Great	Olympias, Queen of Macedonia		
2007	Chaos, This Is		released as Heya Fawda in Egypt	

=== Television ===
Year	Series	Role	Notes	Ref
2022	Faten Amal Harby			
2023	Gaafar El Omda	Queen SafSaf		
	Abyas w Eswed			
	Awrak Misrya			
	Arabisk			
	Zaman Al Aolama			
	Ynabei El Eshk			
	Esh Esh			
