= Mousa (film) =

- موسى
- Directed by: Peter Mimi
- Written by: Peter Mimi
- Starring: Karim Mahmoud Abdel Aziz; Eyad Nassar; Asmaa Abulyazeid; Sarah Elshamy; Salah Abdallah
- Production companies: Synergy Films; New Century; Misr International Films
- Release date: 2021
- Running time: 101 minutes
- Country: Egypt
- Language: Arabic

Mousa (Arabic: موسى) is a 2021 Egyptian science fiction film. The film was written and directed by Peter Mimi, produced by Tamer Morsi, and stars Karim Mahmoud Abdel Aziz, Eyad Nassar, Asmaa Abulyazeid, Sarah Elshamy, and Salah Abdallah. The film is the second part of a series of films called The Oppressed, after the film The Fourth Pyramid by director Peter Mimi released in 2016.

It is the first robot movie in Arab cinema.

== Cast ==
- Karim Mahmoud Abdel Aziz as Yehia
- Eyad Nassar as Dr. Faris Nassar
- Asmaa Abulyazeid as Rika
- Sarah Elshamy as Mariam
- Salah Abdallah as Yehia's father
- Ahmed Hatem as Yusuf
