= Chaos, This Is =

- Film poster
- Arabic: هي فوضى
- Directed by: Youssef Chahine; Khaled Youssef
- Written by: Nasser Abdel-Rahmane
- Produced by: Misr International, 3 B Productions
- Starring: Khaled Saleh; Menna Shalabi; Youssef El Sherif; Hala Sedki; Hala Fakher; Dorra Zarrouk
- Cinematography: Ramsis Marzouk
- Edited by: Ghada Ezzedine
- Music by: Yasser Abdel Rahman
- Distributed by: 3B Productions; MISR International Films
- Release date: November 26, 2007
- Running time: 124 minutes
- Countries: Egypt; France
- Language: Arabic

Chaos, This Is (Arabic: هي فوضى, romanized: Heya Fawda) is the final film from the Egyptian director Youssef Chahine.

== Synopsis ==
Hatem, a shady police officer, handles it with an iron hand. Every single citizen fears and hates him. Only Nour, a young woman he lusts after, dares stand up to him. But Nour is secretly in love with Cherif. Green with envy, Hatem tries to come between them. He wants Nour for himself even if by force.
