= Ahmed Mekky =

Egyptian actor, writer, director, and rapper

- أحمد مكي
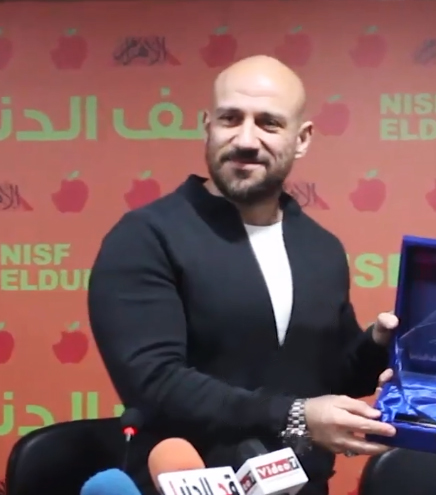
- Mekky after Al-Ahram Press conference, December 2017
- Born: June 19, 1980 (age 46); Oran, Algeria
- Status: Divorced
- Citizenship: Egypt Algeria
- Education: Cairo Higher Institute of Cinema
- Occupations: Actor; rapper; director; writer
- Years active: 2001–present
- Children: 1

Ahmed Mekky (Arabic: أحمد مكي; born June 19, 1980) is an Egyptian-Algerian actor, writer, director and rapper.

== Personal life ==
Ahmed Mekky was born in Oran, Algeria as the son of an Egyptian mother and an Algerian father. He was raised as a boy in the Talbia of Haram District, Giza, Egypt, where he filmed his Egyptian patriotic song clip "Wa'fet Nasyt Zaman". His sister is Enas Mekky, an Egyptian actress. Mekky paused his career for a period of time after suffering from Epstein Barr virus (EBV) infection. He caught the virus after sharing water bottles with his fellow boxing trainees.

Mekky was married to 2 software engineers, Hana and Mariam. They were very smart, with whom he has a dog, Riko. They divorced in 2013.

== Career ==
Mekky began his career after graduating from the directing division at Cairo Higher Institute of Cinema. Mekky started out directing several short films such as Yabanee Asly (An Original Japanese) before directing El Hassa El Sab'a (The Seventh Sense), which starred Ahmed El-Fishawy, in 2005. That work was adapted from a short film that Mekky had previously directed in 2003. Mekky has collaborated with his sister Enas Mekky in directing several television productions, including Lahazat Hariga (Crucial Moments) and Tamer Wa Shaw'eyyah (Tamer and Shaweiyah) in which he also played the role of Haitham Dabour.

Mekky stars in the Ramadan Egyptian comedy series El Kabeer Awy in which he plays both main characters, two brothers vying for the inheritance of their deceased father. In 2013, the third season of El Kabeer Awy introduces a third brother, also played by Mekky. Besides his career in cinema, Mekky has also continued to write rap songs that he performs in films or uploads to the internet.

Film
Year	Film	Role	
2001	Ibn Izz (Rich)	Cameo	
2004	Tito	Driver	
2007	Morgan Ahmad Morgan	Dabour	
2008	The Baby Doll Night	Zaghloul	
2008	H-Dabbour	Haythem Dabbour	
2009	Teer enta (you Fly!)	Dr. Baheeg	
2010	La Tarago' Wala Istislam (Al-Qabda Al-Dameya), (No Retreat, No Surrender: The Bloody Fist)	Hazal'om, Adham	
2011	Cima Ali Baba (Ali Baba's Cinema)		
2013	Samir Abou Alneil	Samir	
Television
Year	Title	Role	
N/A	Shabab Online (Online Teens)		
N/A	Lahazat Harega (Critical Moments)		
2006–2008	Tamer Wa Shaw'eyyah	Haythem Dabbour	
2010	El Kabeer Awy (The Big Boss)	El-Kabeer, El-Kabeer Awy, Johnny El-Kabeer Awy	
2011	El Kabeer Awy 2 (The Big Boss 2)	El-Kabeer, El-Kabeer Awy, Johnny El-Kabeer Awy	
2013	El Kabeer Awy 3 (The Big Boss 3)	El-Kabeer, El-Kabeer Awy, Johnny El-Kabeer Awy, Hazal'om El-Kabeer Awy	
2014	El Kabeer Awy 4 (The Big Boss 4)	El-Kabeer, El-Kabeer Gedan, Johnny El-Kabeer Awy, Hazal'om El-Kabeer Awy	
2015	El Kabeer Awy 5 (The Big Boss 5)	El-Kabeer, Johnny El-Kabeer Awy, Hazal'om El Kabeer Awy, Naeem El Kabeer Awy	
2022	El Kabeer Awy 6 (The Big Boss 6)	El-Kabeer, Johnny El-Kabeer Awy, Hazal’om El Kabeer Awy, Ahmed Mekky	
2017	Khalsana B Sheyaka (Ending so Gently; also known as The Last of the Schmucks on Netflix)	Sultan	Elekhteyar 2 (the choice)
Writer
Year	Film		
2005	Al Hassa Al Sab'a (The Seventh Sense)		
2009	Fo'sh, (Fo'sh)		
2009	Teer enta (You Fly!)		
2010	El Kabeer Awy (The Big Boss)		
Director
Year	Film		
1998	Yabani Asli (short film) (An Original Japanese)		
2005	Al Hassa Al Sab'a (The Seventh Sense)		
2007	Lahazat Harega (Critical Moments)		
TV Appearances/Interviews
Year	Show	Role	
2012	Bassem Youssef Barra el Bernameg (Bassem Youssef Outside "El Bernameg")	As himself	

== Music ==
Ahmed Mekky has achieved recognition for his work in the rap genre. He released successful songs like "Masr Baldy" and "Wa'fet Nasyt Zaman" in 2017. His 2012 album Asloh Araby includes the track "Atr Al Hayah," which samples Galt MacDermot's "Coffee Cold"., in the song "Asloh Araby" Mekky discusses a theory that rap has roots in Arabic poetry going back to the days of trans Saharan trade

In 2022 Mekky made a Collab with fellow Egyptian rapper wegz in the song "aqwa mix", the song was a success being well received by fans
