= MV Salem Express =

Egyptian passenger ferry

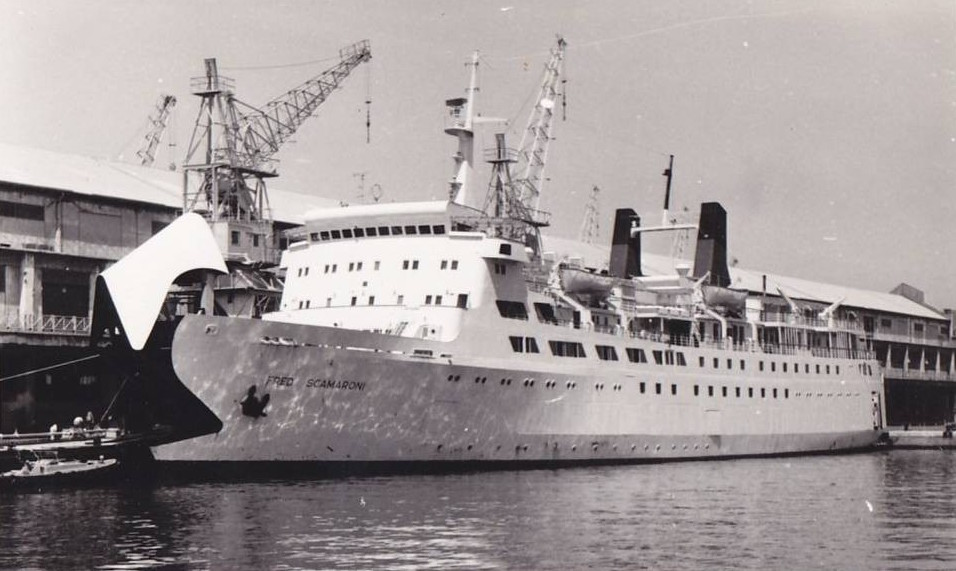
- MS Fred Scamaroni in Marseille

History
- Name: 1966–1980: Fred Scamaroni; 1980–1981: Nuits Saint Georges; 1981–1984: Lord Sinai; 1984–1988: Al Tahra; 1988–1991: Salem Express
- Owner: 1966–1969: Compagnie Générale Transatlantique; 1969–1976: CGTM; 1976–1980: SNCM; 1980: Ole Lauritzen France; 1981–1988: Lord Maritime Enterprise; 1988-1991: Samatour Shipping Company
- Operator: 1966–1969: Compagnie Générale Transatlantique; 1969–1976: CGTM; 1976–1979: SNCM; 1980: Dunkerque Ramsgate Ferries; 1981–1988: Lord Maritime Enterprise; 1988-1991: Samatour Lines
- Port of registry: 1966–1980: Marseille, France; 1980–1981: Dunkirk, France; 1981–1991: Alexandria, Egypt
- Ordered: 15 January 1963
- Builder: Forges et Chantiers de la Méditerranée, La Seyne Sur Mer, France
- Yard number: 1368
- Laid down: June 1963
- Launched: 30 November 1964
- Acquired: 13 May 1966
- Maiden voyage: 14 June 1966
- In service: 1966–1991
- Out of service: 15 December 1991
- Identification: Call sign: 1966–1981: FNOC; IMO number: 6502311
- Fate: Ran aground and sank, 15 December 1991

General characteristics
- Type: Ferry
- Tonnage: 4,771 GT
- Length: 115 m (377 ft 4 in)
- Beam: 17.83 m (58 ft 6 in)
- Draught: 4.78 m (15 ft 8 in)
- Installed power: 2 × SEMT Pielstick 8PC2L; 14,880 Hp (combined)
- Propulsion: Two shafts; controllable pitch propellers
- Speed: 20 knots (37 km/h; 23 mph)
- Capacity: 1,256 passengers; 428 passenger beds; 145 vehicles
- Crew: 63

MV Salem Express was an Egyptian RoRo passenger ship. The ship named after a World War II French resistance member who was captured and tortured, committing suicide in his cell without revealing his mission. Construction began in June 1963. On 30 November 1964, she was launched and towed to Port-de-Bouc for completion, being delivered in June 1965 to the Compagnie Générale Transatlantique, Marseille, France.

On 26 June 1966, a fire in her engine room delayed her maiden voyage. Subsequently, she began operating on her first route between Marseille and Ajaccio. In January 1967, she collided with the Ajaccio quay; and in April 1970, a fire broke out on the way to Bastia. While operating the Dunkirk–Ramsgate route in 1980, she ran aground, and on another occasion caused a traffic jam due to slow truck loading.

In 1988 she was sold to Samatour Shipping Company, Suez, Egypt, and renamed Salem Express. Her scheduled route was between Suez and Jeddah.

AT around 11:13 p.m. on 14 December 1991, Salem Express struck a reef, ran aground, and sank. The majority of passengers were Moroccan or French. Most were returning from pilgrimage to Mecca. The official death toll was 470, though some evidence suggests that the ship was overcrowded and the true death toll may have been much greater, likely more than 1,600.

== Final voyage ==
On its final voyage, Salem Express sailed her usual 720-kilometre (450 mi) journey from Jeddah, Saudi Arabia, to Safaga, Egypt, which took around 36 hours. They intended to unload 350 passengers, before continuing then sailing north to Suez. This route had been the ship's standard schedule since 1988. The ship's departure had been delayed by two days in Jeddah due to a mechanical failure. The night of the sinking was stormy.

The majority of passengers were Moroccan or French. Most were returning from pilgrimage to Mecca. Dives to the shipwreck confirm the "holiday" mood of the ship, with luggage packed with gifts for family members. Pilgrims returning from Mecca were dressed in fine clothes to celebrate.

The ship ran aground on a coral reef between 6–10 miles (9.7–16.1 km) offshore, after deviating from its planned route. The reef ripped a hole in the forward starboard bow, and knocked open the ship's bow door, allowing seawater into the car deck. RoRo ferries are known to be extremely vulnerable once the car-deck is breached.

The official record in Lloyd's Marine Casualties states:

While approaching Safaga at midnight in rough weather, the Master took a short-cut which was not authorised for night passage. The ferry struck a reef and sank within 20 minutes.

Initial reports claimed the ship had drifted off course in the high winds. This was supported by the ship's second officer, Khalid Mamdouh Ahmed, whose job it was to chart the course into the port – claiming no changes had been made. Cairo's state-owned radio quoted Samatour officials as saying the ship had veered off course in bad weather and that attempts had been made, apparently unsuccessfully, to warn it. Egyptian investigators said they had received no reports that the Salem Express deviated from its schedule. However, an alternative belief is that the ship was deliberately taken on a different route by the captain in an attempt at a short-cut, to reduce the travel time by several hours. This was reported by the Al Ahram newspaper. Captain Hassan Moro had commanded the ship since 1988 and was familiar with the waters, and was reportedly known for taking a shortcut between the Hyndman Reef and the coastline from the south, instead around the Panorama Reef from the north. The ship's departure had been delayed due to mechanical problems in Saudi Arabia by two days. Several crew members said the captain was in a hurry, Hassan recalled, and the ship's nurse Hanan Salah said the crew was hurrying in hope of getting a full overnight stop to rest at Safaga before continuing to Suez. This is the most widely reported story in secondary sources.

=== Sinking ===
The ship was due to make port at 11:30pm. The crew were relaxed and did not anticipate the disaster; Captain Hassan Khalil Moro was resting in his cabin, as was his habit, with the first officer on the bridge. At around 11:13pm, a crash rocked the ship as it ran aground, and began shaking. Very soon after, it began listing to one side, and the lights went out. The captain sounded the distress signal. The ship was underwater in close to 11 minutes, trapping hundreds below deck, and sank entirely within 20 minutes.

The speed of the sinking created panic on deck. Only one of the lifeboats was launched. Nurse Salah said there was no time to help people into lifeboats; other survivors complained they had difficulty manning the lifeboats, and that some crew members had pushed them aside to take the boats themselves. Some crew members descended into the ship to knock on cabin doors and rouse passengers; Shaaban abu Siriya, who left his cabin because he heard crew members shouting, said "It just sunk all at once, and I barely had time to get out."

The extreme weather made survival in the water more difficult. Rescue attempts on the night were not attempted due to the storm. One survivor found a life raft in the stormy water after four hours clinging to a wooden oar; it was filled with water and three bodies. Along with another man, she rescued 15 people onto the raft – only for it to capsize in the high waves at 7 a.m. Another man described fellow survivors clinging to the same wooden door being swept away by the waves. Ismail Abdel Hassan, an amateur long-distance swimmer who worked as an agricultural engineer, stood on the ship's deck as it sank. He followed the lights of the port and swam to shore, surviving 18 hours in the water. He attempted to lead two other men to safety, who held onto his clothes, but each died of exhaustion on the way.

=== Rescue and recovery ===
Due to bad weather, rescuers could not begin work until dawn on December 15, with 10-foot (3.0 m) waves and high winds making the rescue operation challenging. Initial efforts were undertaken by four Egyptian naval ships, three air force C-130 transport planes and four helicopters, with support from U.S. and Australian navy helicopters; life rafts and lifejackets were dropped to survivors, and tourist boats also helped to rescue people from the sea. 150 people were reported rescued on December 15, of an eventual 180 survivors, with the rescue attempt again halted overnight by weather and darkness. Search and recovery continued throughout December 16.

Egyptian authorities initially intended to raise the ship. It was found to be lying on its starboard side on the sea-bed. The recovery was halted after three days as it was too dangerous to continue any deeper into the lower levels of the ship.

=== Victims ===
On December 17, the Egyptian Navy began recovery operations, supported by 23 local diving professionals and hobbyists from Hurghada and Safaga. 40 to 50 bodies were recovered on the first day. Family members gathered at the port. Victims recovered were mostly from the uppermost port side of the ship; the ferry's captain, Hassan Khalil Moro, and two other crew members were found in the bridge area, contradicting rumours he had left in a lifeboat.

Many of the deceased had been trapped within the ship as it sank. Although Islamic tradition prefers to avoid burial at sea where possible, it is permissible when there is no other option, and entryways into the ship were welded shut to prevent the bodies from being disturbed in an attempt to protect the site as a tomb. The number of passengers and drowned are both disputed.

Early reports during the crisis struggled to pin down precise figures, with authorities giving conflicting reports:

Sedki initially announced early Sunday evening that 202 people had been rescued. Later, Egyptian television said that the prime minister had tallied 178 rescued. There was also uncertainty over the number of people aboard the ferry. The shipping company manifest reportedly listed 658 people aboard, including the 71-member crew, while the port security department in Safaga listed the total at only 589.

The official Lloyds Maritime Casualties Report claim there were 644 passengers in total - 180 survivors, 117 bodies recovered, out of 464 total victims. Another source gives the passengers as 650 persons - 578 passengers and 72 crew. A contemporary news report gives a slightly different total of 664 passengers, with 179 survivors and 485 missing at time of publication, with 71 crew members. The New York Times reported that only 10 out of 71 crew members had survived. However, other sources claim either the death toll, or the true total of bodies recovered was 850, and that the boat had been overloaded with passengers both on deck and stood in the car deck. The original source of this speculation is unclear.

=== Investigation ===
As well as recovering bodies, Prime Minister Atef Sedki ordered search operations to look for evidence; on the 16th, Egyptian authorities detained seven surviving crew members in order to investigate the cause of the sinking.

== Diving ==
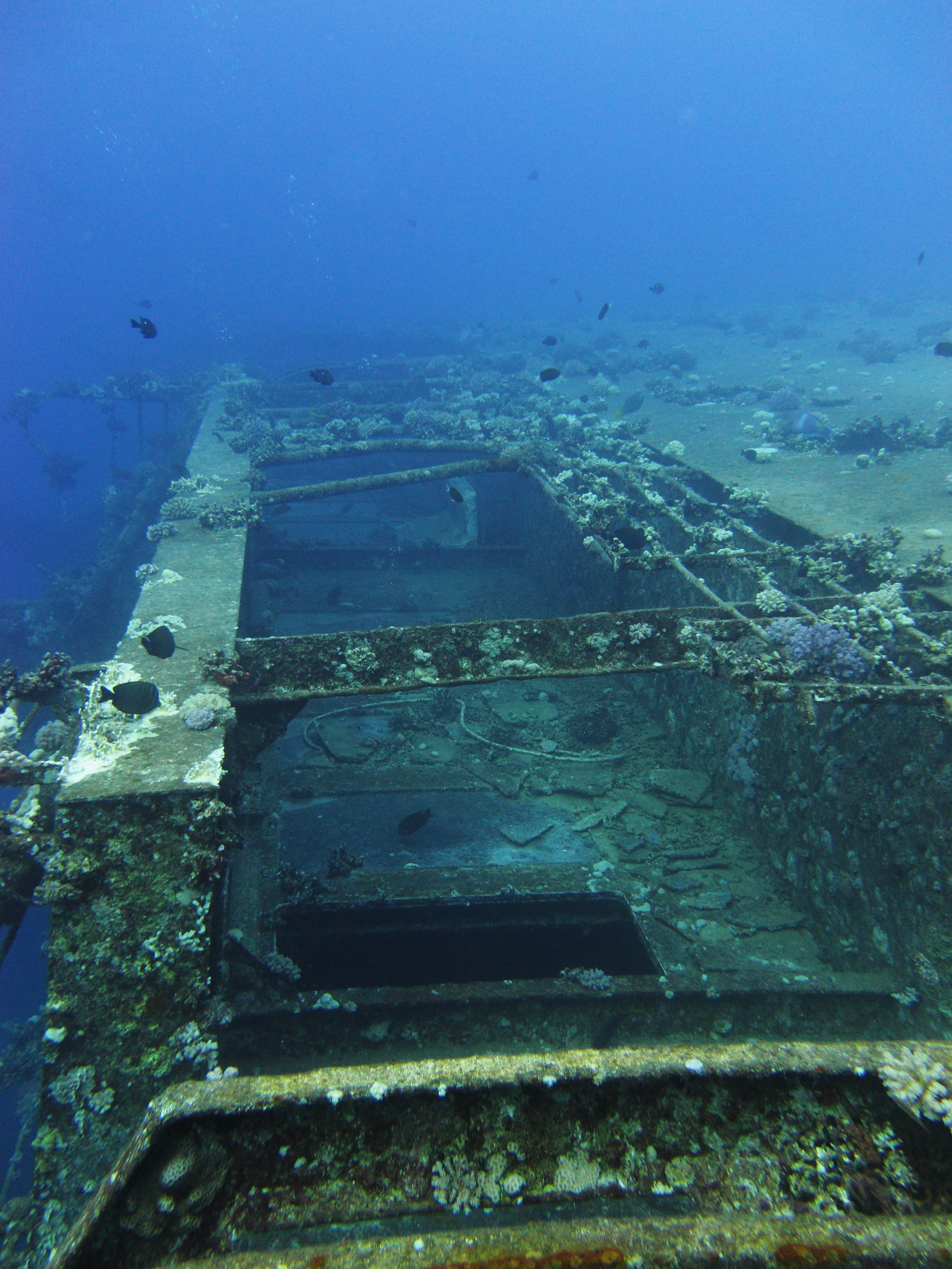
Wreck of the Salem Express as seen in 2009.

The wreck lies off Port Safaga, Hyndman reef, 26º39’01″N; 34º03’48″E; at a depth of 32 metres (105 ft) on sea floor, 12 metres (39 ft) to side of the wreck.

Choosing to dive at the site remains controversial in diving communities, due to the heavy loss of civilian life, the continued presence of bodies at the wreck site, how recent the wreck was, and its impact on nearby communities; the legal status is debated. Although many trips to the wreck are available, some local Dive Guides are uncomfortable with or forbid entry to the wreck, and divers often report feeling sombre or unsettled by the experience. Others visit it as one of many wrecks in the area, seeing it as similar to visiting a historic battlefield or any other ship where there was a loss of life. Despite the reported welding over, the ship can be entered at many points, and its recent sinking means it is comparatively intact, and growing corals. It is known for its large amount of well-preserved artifacts in the debris field and within the ship, including luggage and passenger items: "rolls of carpet, portable stereos, even bicycles and pushchairs" and lifeboats on the sea bed. Some divers emphasize the importance of not interfering with the site as a way to treat it with respect, while others open suitcases and bring up souvenirs.
