= Mahmoud El Bezzawy =

Egyptian actor (born 1963)

- محمود البزاوي
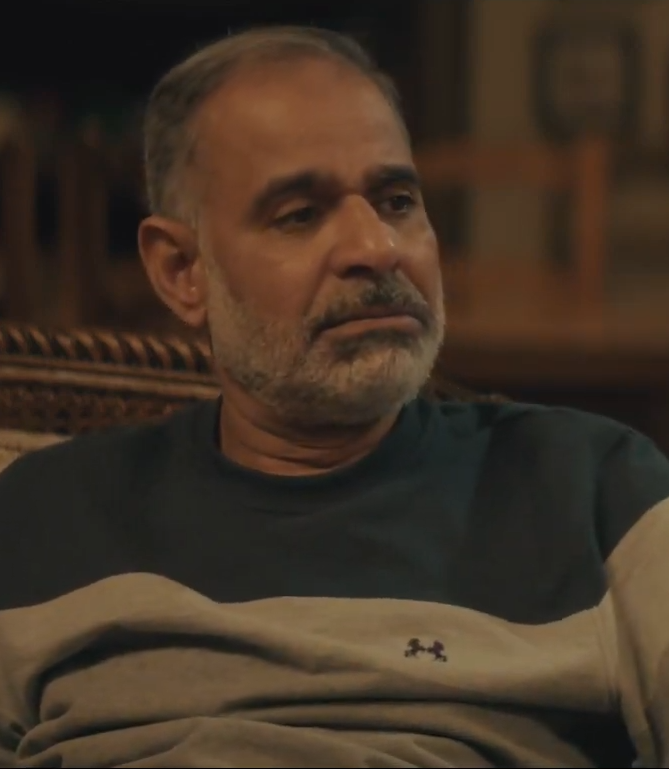
- Born: September 25, 1963 (age 62); El Mahalla El Kubra, Gharbia Governorate, Egypt
- Occupations: Actor, screenwriter

Mahmoud El Bezzawy (born September 25, 1963) is an Egyptian actor and screenwriter.

He was born in El Mahalla El Kubra, Egypt.

He co-wrote the television series Critical Moments (2007). He also co-wrote and starred in the television series Al-Adham (2009).

== Filmography ==
=== Film ===
Year(s)	Title	Role	Notes	Ref.
1996	Nasser 56	Anwar Sadat		
2012	The Deal	Awad Al-Badawi		
2016	30 Years Ago	Magzoob		
2017	Sheikh Jackson	Uncle Shaikh Atef		
2018	El Badla	Chief prosecutor		
2018	Diamond Dust	Naeem		
2019	Casablanca	Joe		
2021	My Bride	Sherif's father		
2023	The Outcasts	Gaber		
2025	Project X	Dr. Kamal		

=== Television ===
Year(s)	Title	Role	Notes	Ref.
2009	Al-Adham	Bahgat		
2015–2016	Grand Hotel	Seddik El Bakry		
2017–2019	Kalabsh	Salah El-Tokhi		
2023	Balto	Sheikh Marzouk		
2025	Hesbet Omry			
