= Peter Mimi =

Egyptian director and screenwriter (born 1987)

- بيتر ميمي
- Born: April 9, 1987 (age 39); Cairo, Egypt
- Occupations: Film director, screenwriter

Peter Mimi (Arabic: بيتر ميمي; born April 9, 1987) is an Egyptian director and screenwriter. He is originally from the Nasr City district of Cairo, Egypt.

== Filmography ==
=== Film ===
Year	Title	Director	Writer	Notes	Ref.
2016	The Fourth Pyramid	Yes	Yes		
2018	Al-Khawaga's Dilemma	Yes	No		
2018	No Surrender	Yes	Yes		
2019	Casablanca	Yes	No		
2021	Mousa	Yes	Yes		
2022	Shalaby	Yes	Yes		
2023	El Ruby House	Yes	No		
2025	Project X	Yes	Yes		

=== Television ===
- The Godfather (2017)
- Kalabsh (2018)
- Kalabsh 2 (2018)
- Kalabsh 3 (2019)
- The Assassins (2024) (El Hashasheen)
- Sohab El Ard (2026)
