= Amir Karara =

Egyptian actor (born 1977)

- أمير كرارة
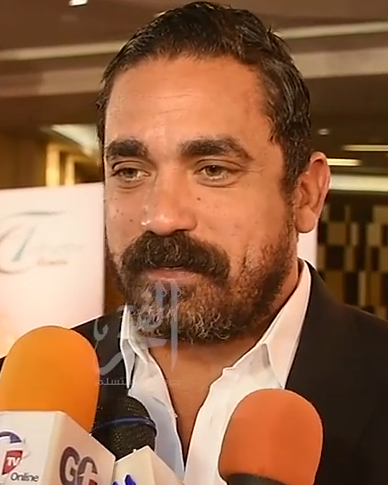
- Karara in an interview with El Fagr News
- Born: Amir Muhammad Hussein Karara; 10 October 1977 (age 47); Cairo, Egypt
- Other names: Pasha of Egypt
- Occupations: Actor; television presenter
- Years active: 1992–present
- Known for: Kalabsh
- Spouse: Hend Salah Hosny (m. 2010)
- Children: 3
- Relatives: Mahmoud Shokoko

Amir Karara (Arabic: أمير محمد حسين كرارة; born 10 October 1977) is an Egyptian actor and TV presenter. His real beginning came during his presentation of Star Maker in 2003. Karara is best known for his dramatic and action roles such as his roles in Karmouz War (2018), Horob Edtirari (2017) and Special Operations (2007). His most important series including Kalabsh (2017), Al Tabbal (2016) and Hawari Bucharest (2015). Karara's recent films have grossed high box office revenues. His series Kalabsh with all its parts, achieved great success in Egypt, where he became famous under the name "Basha Masr" or "Pasha of Egypt".

== Early life ==
Amir Karara was born on 10 October 1977 in Cairo. He graduated from Faculty of Tourism and Hotels, department of tourism, but he did not work in a profession related to his studies. He was a volleyball player and participated in the main national volleyball team in Egypt. He entered world championships in volleyball, but did not continue in the field of sports.

== Personal life ==
Karara married Hend Salah Hosny, sister of footballer and actor Ahmed Salah Hosny, in 2006. They have 3 children: Selim, Laila and Nelly.

In December 2020, Karara announced that he had tested positive for COVID-19. In January 2021, he announced his recovery from it after 16 days.

== Career ==
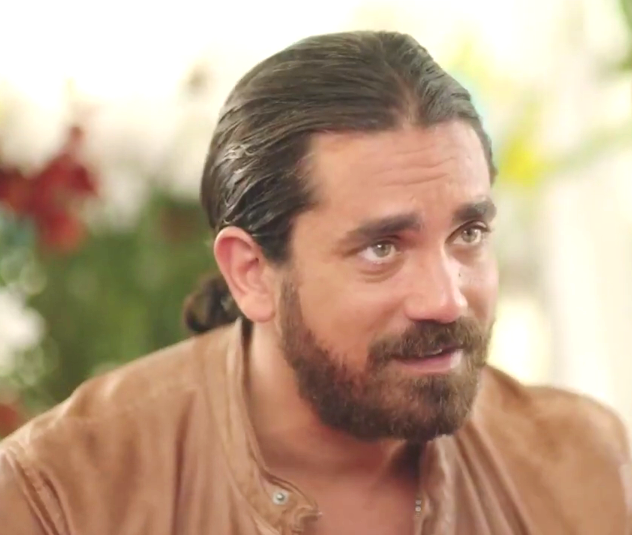
Karara in Hawari Bucharest (2015)

Karara's artistic beginning was in the field of television advertisements. He used to play small roles in the Egyptian advertisements. Until he was discovered by the Egyptian businessman Tarek Nour and presented his first program Star Maker in 2002. In the same year, he participated in the sitcom Youth Online and in the second season in 2003.

After that, Karara's artistic works continued, including The Best of Times (2004), Zaky Chan (2005), Special Operations (2007) and Kasablanka (2019).

Karara starred as Sleim El-Ansary in the Egyptian drama series Kalabsh, which was released during Ramadan 2017. The second season was released in Ramadan 2018 and the third season in Ramadan 2019. In 2020, he portrayed Ahmed Mansi in the Egyptian biographical drama series Al Ekhtiar.

== Works ==
=== Films ===
Year	Title	Role	Notes
2000	Hello America	The translator	
2004	The Best of Times	Tarek	
2005	Zaky Chan	Hazem	
2007	Special Operations	Youssef	
2009	Nights of love	Sherif	
2017	Horob Edtirari	Mustafa Mukhtar	
2018	Karmouz War	General Youssef Al-Masry	
2019	Kasablanka	Omar Murr	
2019	Sabea El Boromba	Cameo	

=== Series ===
Year	Title	Role	Notes
2001	Leladala Wogouh Katheera	Amir	
2003	Aunt Nour	Hany	
2006	Eli Ekhtasho Mato	Ibrahim	
2007	Critical moments	Dr. Amr	
2008	Tears of the moon	Amir	
2009	My Heart Is My Guide	Salvador	
2009	Khas Gedan	Cameo	
2010	Critical moments 2	Dr. Amr	
2010	Love story	Abed	
2010	Hekayat w Beneshha: Fatat El-Leil	Sameh	
2010	Barra eldonya	Ezzat	
2011	Al Moatn X	Hossam Al-Masry	
2011	The doors of fear	Youssef Ramzy	
2012	Critical moments 3	Dr. Amr	
2012	Ruby	Tamer	
2012	Taraf Talet	El-Raek "Memi"	
2013	Taht el Ard	Jamal Al-Jabali / State Security Officer / Raymond Maqar / Ahmed Al-Toukhi	
2014	Ana Eshkt	Hassan Al-Rashidi	
2015	Hawari Bucharest	Syed Gad Allah "Syed Bucharest"	
2015	Arabian Nights 2015	Negm El Din	
2016	Al Tabbal	Saleh Abu Jazia	
2017	Kalabsh	Sleim El-Ansary	
2018	Kalabsh 2	Sleim El-Ansary	
2018	Wakkelna Walla	Cameo	
2019	Kalabsh 3	Sleim El-Ansary	
2020	Al Ekhtiar	Ahmed Mansi	
2020	Madrasat Elhob 3	Salah / Yahya	The story of waiting
2020	Essaef Younes	Cameo	
2021	Nasl El-Aghrab	Ghufran El-Gharib	

=== Programs ===
Year	Title	Notes
2003	Star Maker	
2010	Celebrity Duets	
2013	El-Khazna	
2019	Sahranin	
