= Mohamed Ramadan (actor and singer) =

Egyptian actor and singer (born 1988)

- محمد رمضان
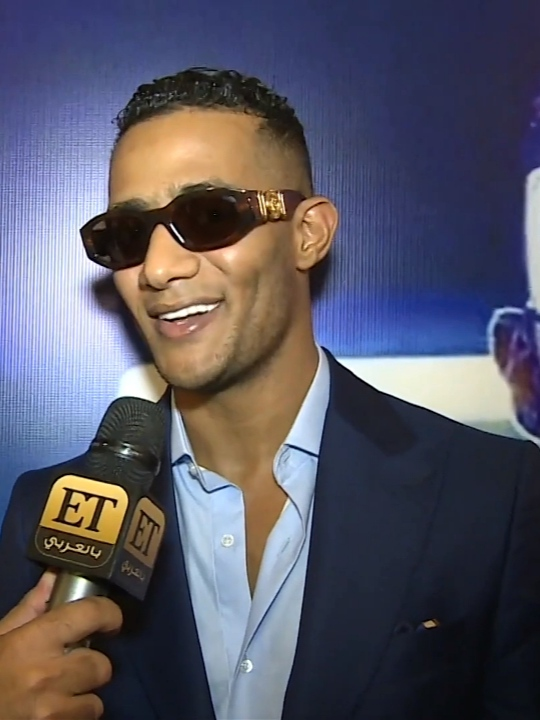
- Born: Mohamed Ramadan; 23 May 1988 (age 38); Qena, Egypt
- Occupations: Actor; singer
- Years active: 2004–present
- Notable work: El Ostoura; Gaafar El Omda; El Prince; Abdu Mota

Mohamed Ramadan (Arabic: محمد رمضان; born in Qena, 23 May 1988) is an Egyptian actor and singer. His fans nickname him The Eagle of Upper Egypt. Mohamed Ramadan is known as one of the most prominent stars of Arabic-language television, with each period bringing a role that becomes the subject of widespread interest, attention, and debate. At the peak of his career, he was one of the most prominent actors at the box office and on music charts in Egypt and the Middle East.

== Biography ==
Mohamed Ramadan was born on 23 May 1988 in Qena Governorate, and his family later migrated to Giza Governorate. His father’s and mother’s origins are in Qena. Ramadan’s ancestry traces back to the village of Al-Qala in the markaz of Qift in Qena Governorate. His family is of Egyptian origin despite false claims of his father being of Sudanese origins.

Ramadan is the youngest of his siblings. While in preparatory school, he succeeded in joining the football academy of Zamalek SC. However, after enrolling at El Saidya highschool, he left football to focus on his studies. He began acting at an early age in his school’s theatre, where he was noticed by critic Ahmed Abdel Hamid, who wrote about him in Al-Gomhuria newspaper and convinced his mother to allow him to continue his education at the Higher Institute of Dramatic Arts.

== Acting career ==
Mohamed Ramadan began acting during school being a part of theatre team of El Saidya highschool and won the Best Young Talent award at his school, Saeedeya Military High School, for two consecutive years—an achievement that was a first in the school’s history. He started his career with small roles in TV series like The Cindrella, until he had his big break in Yousry Nasrallah's Scheherazade, Tell Me a Story. He then went on to star in films that have been criticised for violence such as The German (2012), Lion heart (2013), Abdu Mota (2014) which made him one of the most valuable actors in the Middle East. Mohamed Ramadan was praised by Jean-Claude Van Damme and Oscar nominee and golden globe winner Omar Sharif, who stated that Mohamed would perpetuate his acting legacy.

He later gained wider recognition and was known at some point to be the best Egyption and sometimes, Arab actor through his popular television roles in Ibn Halal (2014), Al Ostoura (2016), Earthquake (2017) Eagle of Upper Egypt (2018) Al-Prince (2020) and Gaafar El Omda (2023). He also found success in the film The Treasure part 1 (2017) and part 2 (2019). Some of his tv shows would be the most watched in Ramadan month. Ramadan has also received major recognition for his acting, including the Arab sat festival award for best actor in Arabic tv three times consecutively and the Murex d’Or for Best Arab Actor.

Apart from his tv shows and films, Ramadan also performed in theatre in which he made his commercial theatre debut in 2016 with Ahlan Ramadan (Hello Ramadan) at Al-Haram Theatre. The play became a major hit and attracted widespread popularity. He performed in Bahrain and Kuwait afterwards.

In 2026, In the film Asad, Mohamed Ramadan takes on the lead role of a character inspired by Spartacus, the famous slave who rebelled in Ancient Rome. The film’s focus on slavery was particularly meaningful to the director Mohamed Diab, noting that the issue remains relevant today in different forms. He also viewed the project as an opportunity to tell a story about slavery from an Arab perspective, something he felt had rarely been explored in cinema from the region. The film also presented a major visual challenge, with a budget of around $7 million. Ramadan aimed to demonstrate how much could be achieved with that budget in Egypt, believing the finished film looked like a production costing around $40 million.

== Acting Style ==
Mohamed Ramadan became particularly known for portraying tough, streetwise characters, often playing figures involved in crime, violence and illegal activities. His roles frequently centered on strong-willed characters who relied on physical strength, intimidation and fearlessness to overcome obstacles. His portrayal of Nasser El-Dessouky in Al-Ostoura (The Legend) became one of his most influential roles. The series quickly became a major talking point among viewers and critics and was so popular that it competed for attention with European Championship football matches in local cafés dividing the crowds seated. Nasser’s appearance, aggressive personality and mannerisms were widely imitated by young viewers, including his distinctive hairstyle and beard. The influence reportedly extended beyond appearance, with some incidents of violence and criminal behavior linked to people attempting to imitate actions from the series. This sparked criticism of Ramadan’s frequent portrayal of violent characters and raised concerns about some viewers failing to separate fictional behavior from reality. Despite the controversy, Al-Ostoura further established Ramadan’s reputation for playing powerful and confrontational characters. He also demonstrated his versatility by taking on comedic roles, including Wahed Saidi (2014) and Hasal Kheir (2012).

== Music career ==
Alongside acting, Ramadan has developed a successful music career, combining Arabic pop with hip-hop and Afro-influenced styles. His 2020 collaboration with Gims, Ya Habibi, became a major international hit, reaching the top of the charts in 15 countries. Other successful songs include Number One (2018), Ensay (2019) feat Saad Lamjarred, Mafia (2019), Bum Bum (2020) and Ana Enta (2025). He has also worked with international artists such as Rema, Future and French Montana. His international profile continued to grow through collaborations outside the Arab music scene, including Sah Sah with Lara Trump. He was also scheduled to perform at the Theater at Madison Square Garden, becoming the first Arab artist to perform at the venue. Ramadan is managed by Liil Serge, the founder and CEO of LSM Prod. He became the first Egyptian artist to perform at the Coachella Valley Music and Arts Festival and later signed with William Morris Endeavor (WME) for worldwide representation. Ramadan has a social media following of more than 85 million people, including over 34 million Instagram followers. In 2020, he became the first Egyptian artist to receive YouTube’s Diamond Creator Award after surpassing 10 million subscribers. His YouTube videos have since accumulated billions of views.

One of his most famous songs in his 2019 "Mafia" which was a diss track on the singer Bushra in response to her releasing a diss track on him, similarly many big name Egyptian rappers like Wegz and Ahmed El-Fishawy have released diss tracks on Ramadan but he became less inclined to enter beefs in recent years. In 2020, his Youtube channel was one of the most-viewed in the Middle East.

== Controversy ==
In October 2019, Ramadan posted a video of himself in a co-pilot's seat during a private flight run by Smart Aviation Company to Saudi Arabia, which led to a life-time ban on the pilot, Ashraf Abu Al-Yusr, due to violations against the Egyptian civil aviation law. In June 2021, the Egyptian Public Prosecution froze all bank accounts of Ramadan, as he had to pay £E6 million in compensation to the family of the pilot Abu Al-Yusr, who had died earlier that year.

On November 21, 2020, the Israeli Ministry of Foreign Affairs shared a photo of Ramadan with Arab-Israeli footballer Dia Saba and Israeli singer Omer Adam in a rooftop party in Dubai, which sparked condemnation by Arabs on social media accusing Ramadan of being a Zionist. The incident came months after Israel signed normalization deals with the United Arab Emirates and Bahrain. Egyptian–Israeli relations have remained chilled since signing the peace treaty in 1979. The Union of Artistic Syndicates suspended his membership for the same reason. A soap opera featuring Ramadan was also reportedly cancelled. By mid-December that year, he was exempt from any suspension or penalties related to the issue.

In August 2022, Ramadan received backlash after he posted a photo of him with his arm around an Israeli fan on his TikTok account. The photo was widely shared on social media and became the subject of articles in Egyptian newspapers including Al-Masry Al-Youm. The photo was described as "a stamp of approval for normalization with Israel". Ramadan did not address the condemnations.

In May 2023, Mohamed Ramadan met with Mahmoud Abbas the president of the Palestinian Authority, Ramadan posted photos of the meeting on his Instagram page and commented on them, saying: “In New York today, I was honored to meet Mr. President Mahmoud Abbas Abu Mazen, President of the beloved and dear State of Palestine.

In October 2023 Mohamed Ramadan said in a video on his Instagram that his character's name in his next series will be named Abu Obaida after Abu Obaida the spokesperson for the Ezzedeen al-Qassam Brigades, the military wing of Hamas.

In April 2025, Mohamed Ramadan sparked controversy again when he appeared at a party in California wearing a long, slit dress adorned with gold beads. The outfit was widely compared to belly dance costumes, and some observers interpreted it as imitating and parodying Khawal. The incident led to several complaints being filed against him, accusing him of disrespecting Egypt and its people.

== Notable songs ==
- 2018: Number one
- 2018: El Malek
- 2019: Mafia
- 2019: Ensay feat Saad Lamjarred
- 2020: Bum Bum
- 2020: Enta Gada
- 2020: Ya Habibi feat Gims
- 2021: "C'est fini" (with Gims)
- 2022: "Every Day" (feat. Dammy Krane)
- 2023: "TMO" (Turn Me On) (Issam Alnajjar feat. Mohamed Ramadan and Gims)
- 2023: "Nécessaire" (Necesar) (with Mohamed Ramadan, Mario Fresh and Renvtø)
- 2023: "Case Closed" (with Skales)
- 2023: "Akwaba" (Magic System, Yemi Alade and Mohamed Ramadan)
- 2024: "Arabi" (Mohamed Ramadan, Future and Massari)

== Personal life ==
Ramadan has married twice. He has a daughter from his first marriage. He later married Nesreen El Sayed Abd El Fattah, with whom he has two children.

== Awards ==
Prizes and honors.

Hollywood International Film Award for Best Actor for his role in the movie “Speak, Scheherazade” in 2009.

Egypt’s “Greatest Nationwide Talent” award three consecutive times

Youth Star Award from Nile Drama Channels in 2015.

Best Actor Award for Nile Drama Channels in 2016.

Best Radio Series Award from Nile Drama Channels for the series “Neither Magic nor Sorcery” in 2017.

Best Actor Award from Nile Drama Channels for his role in the series “Eagle of Upper Egypt” in 2018.

Shield of Honor from the British University in Egypt in 2018.

Best Actor Award from Arab satellite channels for his role in the series “Earthquake” in 2019.

Best Actor Award from the Piaf Festival in Lebanon for his role in the series “Earthquake” in 2019.

Most Popular Singer in Africa Award from the Africa Music Awards Festival in Nigeria in 2019.

Best Arab Actor Award from the Arab Satellite TV Festival for his role in the series “Prince” in 2020.

King of Arab Fashion Award for Men from the International Fashion Award Festival in 2020.

Najm Award 2020 from the Dubai Hospitality Festival 2020.

Shield of Honor from the Best International Festival in 2021.

The Most Popular Arab Star Award from the Murex D’Or Festival in Lebanon in 2022.

The Biggest Star in the Arab World Award from the Filmfare Festival in India in 2022.

Creativity Award from the Luxor African Film Festival 2023.

== Video games ==
He becomes the first Arab star to ever appear as a playable character in the world’s number one mobile game Garena:Free Fire.

== Filmography ==
=== Films ===
- Awlad Al-Shareware (2006)
- Ramy Al-Etsamy (2007)
- Ehky ya Chahrazade (2009)
- El Almany (2012)
- Abdo Mota (2012)
- Sa'a We Nos (2012)
- Hassal Kher (2012)
- Qalb El-Assad (2013)
- Wahed Sa'idy (2014)
- Shadd Agzaa (2015)
- El-Kenz (The Treasure 1) (2017)
- Jawab Ieteqal (2017)
- Akher Deek Fe Masr (2017)
- Hassan Allam shabah (2018)
- el-Diesel (2018)
- El-Kenz 2 (The Treasure - 2) (2019)
- Sery lel 8aya (2020)
- Top Secret (2021)
- Asad (2026)

=== Television series ===
- El-Sharika (2012)
- Ibn Halal (2014)
- Al Ostoura (2016)
- Nesr el-Saeed (2018)
- Zelzal (2019)
- Al Prince (2020)
- Mousa (2021)
- Jaafar Al Omda (2023)
