= Al-Khawaga's Dilemma =

2018 film directed by Peter Mimi

- Promotional poster
- Directed by: Peter Mimi
- Produced by: Ahmed El Sobky; Mohamed Ahmed El Sobky
- Starring: Hassan El Radad; Hana El Zahed
- Music by: Adel Hakki
- Release dates: 6 January 2018 (Egypt); 17 January 2018 (Kuwait)
- Language: Egyptian

Al-Khawaga's Dilemma, also known as Oqdet Al Khawaja (Arabic: عقدة الخواجة, romanized: Uqdat al-Khawagah), is a 2018 Egyptian comedy-drama film that explores the intricate dynamics of love, deception, and social class. Directed by Peter Mimi and scripted by Hesham Maged and Chico, the film presents a captivating narrative set against the backdrop of Cairo, Egypt.

== Plot ==
The storyline follows Youssef, an ambitious yet economically challenged salesman, as he navigates the complexities of a burgeoning romance with Layla, the privileged daughter of a powerful businessman. The stark contrast in their social standings becomes a formidable obstacle, compelling Youssef to construct a facade of wealth and success. As their relationship deepens, Youssef becomes entangled in a web of lies, facing familial disapproval and the constant threat of his true identity being exposed.

== Cast ==
- Hassan El Radad
- Hana El Zahed
- Maged El Masry
- Mohamed Lotfi

== Production ==
Directed by socially conscious filmmaker Peter Mimi, Al-Khawaga's Dilemma was brought to life through the collaborative efforts of producers Ahmed El Sobky and Mohamed Ahmed El Sobky. Filming took place in Cairo, capturing the city's diverse social landscapes. The film's soundtrack, composed by Adel Hakki, seamlessly blends popular Egyptian melodies with orchestral arrangements, enhancing the cinematic experience.

== Release and reception ==
Al-Khawaga's Dilemma premiered in Egypt on January 6, 2018, followed by a release in Kuwait on January 17, 2018. While achieving moderate success at the Egyptian box office, critical reception was varied. Some praised the film for its light hearted humor and insightful social commentary, while others criticized its predictable plot and reliance on comedic tropes.
