= X-Large (film) =

2011 film by Sherif Arafa

- Film Poster
- Directed by: Sherif Arafa
- Written by: Ayman Bahgat Amar
- Produced by: Rotana Film Production; United Bros. Studios; Shadows Communications
- Starring: Ahmed Helmy; Donia Samir Ghanem
- Cinematography: Ayman Abu El Makarem
- Music by: Hesham Nazih
- Distributed by: Rotana Studios; A United Bros. Cinema Distribution; Shadows Communications
- Release date: November 2, 2011
- Running time: 130 minutes
- Country: Egypt
- Language: Arabic
- Budget: £E30,226,320

X-Large (Arabic: إكس لارج) is a 2011 Egyptian romantic comedy film. The title is making fun of the extra large sizes found in stores to categorize large clothes.

It stars Ahmed Helmy as the main character, Magdy.

== Plot ==
Magdy is a cartoonist living with his uncle in Cairo. Both are severely overweight and suffer from eating disorders.

He has many female friends who all see him as one of the girls and have no romantic attraction towards him. All he wants is a woman who can see past his unsightly exterior and see him for who he is inside.

He reconnects with Dina, a girl he had a crush on back when he was a skinny kid, via Facebook and they get to know each other over the phone, without ever having seen any pictures of each other. She reveals that she is returning to Egypt soon and would like to see him.

Dina, upon arriving, asks Magdy to pick her up from the airport which he agrees to do while secretly praying that she doesn’t turn out to be too conventionally attractive. When Magdy sees how beautiful Dina is, he lacks the confidence to out himself as Magdy and instead introduces himself as Magdy’s cousin Adel and informs her that Magdy had to travel abroad.

With his female friends’ help, he proceeds to try to get her to love him as Adel, fat and all. He purchases a separate mobile phone so that he can pretend to make calls to her pretending to be two separate people. Dina does not notice.

Understanding that a woman wants a man who is dependable, he becomes her personal driver, first transporting her family to a funeral, then helping her run errands even at odd hours. He continues drawing scenes of his recent life and making excuses to explain Magdy's absence.

They then get to start dating. Magdy begins to believe they have fallen in love due to her happiness while they are together.

An elementary school classmate of his, Hamada, is a successful business executive. Magdy pitches him the idea of producing a political satire magazine with his drawings of people he has encountered throughout his life. Hamada rejects this, in part due to the poor physical health that Magdy is in.

Magdy and Dina continue going on dates, but Magdy is kicked out of a movie theater due to his weight blocking the view of those behind him. They celebrate his uncle's birthday together. Magdy proposes to Dina through showing her a showcase of art, only to be rejected. She says that the only reason she dated him was because of a college project examining the life of overweight people.

His uncle tells him to lose weight and not repeat his own mistakes of not caring for his health. After an argument, the uncle leaves his house. Later, Magdy receives a phone call from his uncle who announces that he's dying. Rushing to meet him, his car overturns and he is injured.

Magdy then arrives to his uncle's house, where he tells him his last words, "Get thin Magdy." He returns to Hamada, who puts him on a strict diet and exercise routine.

One day, drawing in the shack Hamada gave him, he realizes he is not hungry, then runs out in the rain and starts shouting out, "I'm not hungry! I'm not hungry!"

Two years later, Magdy is now very thin and about to launch the first issue of his magazine. He is not recognizable by anyone. The animated show starts and the Fitness Coach announces the artist of the animation. He reveals it is Magdy, to everyone's surprise.

Magdy is then seen smiling and reconnecting with Dina who is more inclined to a long-term relationship with him. His stomach then bellows and he goes on to say, "I want to eat."

== Cast ==
- Ahmed Helmy as Magdy
- Donia Samir Ghanem as Dina
- Ibrahim Nasr as Azmy
- Khaled Sarhan as Hamada
- Amy Samir Ghanem as Mai
- Mohamed Shaheen as Samy
- Nahed El Sebai as Nany
- Yasmin Raeis as Riham
- Said Tarabeek as Magdy's manager
- Anaam Salosa as Dina's aunt
