= El Ostoura =

- No. of episodes: 30

Release
- Original release: 2 June 2016

El Ostoura (Arabic: الإسطورة) is an Egyptian television series that was aired during Ramadan on 6 June 2016 on MBC Masr. El Ostoura is derived from an Arabic word, which means "The Legend". The series stars Mohamed Ramadan, who played the role of two brothers; Refai El Deskouy, and Nasser El Desouky. The genre of this series is Action Drama. The story was written by Mohamed Abd El Moati, and directed by Mohamed Sami.

== Plot ==
The story centers around Refai El Desouky (Wird Ikr), a well-known, well-loved man who owns an illegal weapon manufacturing workshop in a Cairo slum. Despite the wealth this brings him, he remains identified with the lower class. Refai has inherited the factory from his father who established it and is carrying on his father's legacy and supporting his family. The central family consists of Rifai; his wife, Hanan; their two daughters; Rifai's mother, Fat'hiyya; his sister, Samah; and Nasser, his youngest brother. Rifai is also part of a group powerful elites who refer to themselves as the "Higher Power". Essam El Nemr, the antagonist, is a competitor who runs a similar illegal weapons factory. He finds Rifai challenging and envies his power and position.

Throughout the series, it is made clear that if someone does not abide by the rules of the weapons trading industry, they will be killed. As the story progresses, Refai decides not to follow an order given to him by the "Higher Power" and rebels against them. As a consequence of his decision, Refai is gunned down by a rifle from a passing car.

Following the death of Refai, the focus of the series shifts to his younger brother, Nasser. Unlike his brother, Nasser is an ambitious man who does not want to maintain the family legacy and instead wants to pursue a more stable, safe, and lucrative career. This ambition is furthered by the desire to marry the love of his life, Tamara, which would require he provide a more sophisticated lifestyle. Nasser decides to leave Egypt, moving to another Arab country and applying to work for the Legal Consultancy. Circumstances, however, were set against him and Nassar is forced to return home by his mother's health issues. Upon his return to Egypt, Nassar realizes that his life is getting more complicated and he should take the responsibility of facing one of the most prominent local families. Tamara, the woman Nassar want to marry, decides out of curiosity to visit his family's house to see the manner in which they live and be introduced to them as Nasser's girlfriend. Tamara is surprised to find that Nasser's social class is far beneath her own. This disappointment leads her to plot with her parents to reject Nasser's eventual marriage proposal.

After Nassar is rejected by Tamara's parents, his life quickly deteriorates in a series of devastating events including being imprisoned along with two of his uncles due to Refai's illegal business. During Nasser's imprisonment, the women in his family pay him a visit and explain to him the cruelty and mistreatment they have faced since Isam took Refai's death and Nasser's absence as an opportunity to seize power. This revelation inspires Nasser to follow his brother's path in joining the "Higher Power" in order to reclaim their family legacy and return respect and power to his family. He is bailed out by Salmawi; an ex-member of the elite group. Salmawi believes Nassar's unfortunate situation would be a good opportunity to collaborate with a member of the Disouqi family.

Even though Nasser did not originally want to follow his brother into the family business, he ends up being an even more powerful weapons' manufacturer than Refai. Through the business he once spurned, Nasser is able to attain the sophisticated lifestyle he had always dreamt of. Fate, it seems, plays a role in the lives of both Tamara and Nasser, leading them back into each other's lives. At this point Nasser has completely moved on from their relationship, even marrying Tamara's husband's sister. Now as brother and sister-in-law, Nassar and Tamara live together under one roof, a nightmare for Tamara having rejected him earlier. Eventually, the money corrupts Nasser's morals, leading him to commit a series of murders which results in the death of his own mother. The series ends with Nasser turning himself into the police and confessing to his crimes. The closing scene of the entire series shows Nasser being sentenced to death.

== Cast ==
- Mohamed Ramadan: Nasser and Refai El Deskouy
- Rogina: Hanan
- Imad Zeyada: Police officer
- Mohammad Abd El Hafez: Essam El Nemr
- Yasmine Sabri: Tamara
- Mohsin Mansoor: Salmawy
- Nesreen Amin: Samah
- Ali Nosseir: Nousa
- Mai Omar : Shahd

== Film festivals and commercial releases ==
Many commercials were aired on MBC 1, 2, 3, 4, Drama, Max, Masr, and Action.

The cast won an award at the Al Ahram Festival

== See also ==
- List of Egyptian television series
