= Kalabsh =

- Starring: Amir Karara
- No. of episodes: Season 1 (30 Episodes) Season 2 (30 Episodes) Season 3 (30 Episodes)

Kalabsh (Egyptian Arabic: كلبش; English: Handcuffs) is a 2017 Egyptian drama and suspense television series directed by Peter Mimi and starring Amir Karara in the role of Sleim El-Ansary, a most confident and honest policeman. The series is based on a story written by Yousef Hasan Yousef, then dramatized and scripted by Baher Dewidar.

A sequel was released in 2018 and a third season was released in 2019.

== Production ==
Director Mohamed Bakeer was supposed to direct the show, but that didn't happen due to disagreements with producer Muhammed Abdel Hamid, which led to assigning young director Peter Mimi to direct Klabash 1, 2 and working on the third season. Mimi is known with his style mimicking Hollywood crime flicks and working with western artists

== Overview ==
Mimi, Karara and others stated that the production team got big help from Egyptian police ministry on the two seasons of the series, also more logistic and influencing cooperation, to deliver a good message of the honest police man who fights for the right, and also other re-accruing problems that affects Egypt at this particular period, such as Islamic militias, however, the director stated that there was no interference by them in the show.

== Cast ==
- Amir Karara: Sleim El-Ansary
- Mohamed Lotfy: Ibrahim El-Sunni
- Reem Mostafa: Farida
- Eslam Hafez: Tamer Lutfi Abu El-Majd
- Diab: Zanati El-Sayyed Zeynhom
- Ahmed Seyam: Lutfi Abu El-Majd
- Mohsen Mansour: Mahmoud Abd El-Moneim (Houda Saitara)
- Tarek El Nahry: Nashaat Fahmy
- Mahmoud El Bezzawy: Salah El-Tokhi
- Mahmoud Hegazy: Ziad
- Mohamed Marzaban: Hammad
- Sarah Elshamy: Salma El-Ansari
- Mohamed Ezz: Attia Azzam
- Omar El Shenawy:Hossam

== See also ==
- Kalabsh 2
