= Tamer Wa Shaw'eyyah =

Egyptian television series

Tamer Wa Shaw'eyyah (Arabic: تامر وشوقية) is an Egyptian sitcom acted by Ahmed El-Fishawy and May Kassab.

The screenplay was written by: Amr Samir Atef - Twitter Alasfory - Ayman Ahmed Khalaf

Directed by: Osama Al Abd
