= El Kabeer Awy =

Egyptian Series

- Starring: Ahmed Mekky, Donia Samir Ghanem

Release
- Original release: September 15, 2010

El-Kabeer Awi (Arabic: الكبير أوي) is an Egyptian television series featuring Ahmed Mekky.

Its first season was broadcast in Ramadan 2010. After Mekky broke his leg halfway through, the series continued under the name El Kabeer Awi 2, which was released during Ramadan in 2011. A third, fourth, fifth, sixth, seventh and eighth season were released in 2013, 2014, 2015, 2022, 2023 and 2024 respectively.

== Overview ==
Mekky portrays three characters in this show via the use of wigs and makeup. He portrays the mayor of Al-Mazarita, a fake village in Egypt. Earlier in his life, he met an American woman and had twins with her. One child stayed in Egypt while the other went to America, both of whom portrayed by Mekky. Once the mayor is on his deathbed, his American-raised son goes to Egypt to claim his father's title. The sons battle to see who will take over, particularly which son is deemed the funniest.

Hazal'om, a character from one of Mekky's previous movies, is introduced in Season 3 as Al-Kabeer and Johnny's long-lost brother from Abdeen, a small town in Egypt. They eventually get rid of him as he goes to Saudi Arabia to visit his mother who is about to get married. He returns in the Season 3 finale as a millionaire who buys Al-Kabeer and Johnny's house. In Season 4, he explains how he became a millionaire after a project in Tanzania. In the Season 4 finale, another new character is introduced in Na'eem Al-Kabeer Awy, their long lost brother from Sudan who inherits his father's money. In Season 5, he gives Al-Kabeer his father's company in Turkey. While in Turkey, he gets attacked by a gang and gets his passport stolen, losing his memory in the process. After months of trying to get in contact with Al-Kabeer, Hazal'om travels to Turkey to search for him. Meanwhile, Al-Kabeer is taken by an old lady as she lets him stay at her place and gives him a new name in "Mohannad". While there, he falls in love with a lady named "Khoshnaf". He begins working for "Baba Doblos" at his boxing gym, where he cleans the bathroom. One day, he is bullied by a boxer named Roman who challenges him to a match. Al-Kabeer loses and Baba Doblos finds out. He convinces to train him to become a boxer. Meanwhile, Khoshnaf's father finds out that she is in love with Al-Kabeer and threatens to kill him. He says the only way for him to marry his daughter is to defeat Roman. Elsewhere, Hazal'om visits his friend Yuri in order to help him find his brother. There, he meets Sasha, a serial killer who works for Yuri. As Hazal'om and Yuri are discussing business, a man in a metal suit kills Yuri with a sword and runs off. As Yuri is dying, he tells Hazal'om to give Sasha his ring but Hazal'om keeps it for himself, making him the leader of the mafia. After Al-Kabeer finally beats Roman, Hazal'om and his mafia attack. Hazal'om hides while the mafia take care of business. As Hazal'om is hiding, he recognizes Al-Kabeer's voice and saves him from getting shot by Sasha. They both wake up at the hospital and Al-Kabeer gains his memory back, but forgets everything that happened in Turkey. Hazal'om tells him the whole story and says his goodbyes to Sasha while Al-Kabeer says his goodbyes to Khoshnaf. When they go back to Cairo, Al-Kabeer discovers that his wife is an asylum. In the Season 5 finale, Hazal'om and the gang save the planet from a meteoroid. It is shown in this episode that Hazal'om, Al-Kabeer and Johnny start getting along as Hazal'om and the gang say their goodbyes.

The plot and characters are partially inspired by Mekky's previous movies.
