= List of Egyptian films of the 2000s =

The following is an incomplete list of Egyptian films of the 2000s. For an A-Z list of films currently on Wikipedia, see Category:Egyptian films.

== 2000s ==
Title	Director	Actors	Genre	Notability
2000
Hello America	Nader Galal	Adel Emam, Sherine	Comedy	
2001
Ayyam El Sadat (The Days of Sadat)	Mohamed Khan	Ahmad Zaki, Mervat Amin, Mona Zaki, Ahmed El Sakka	Biographical	
Rasha Garea (Bold Spray)	Said Hamed	Ashraf Abdel Baqi, shabaan Abdel Rehim, Yasmin Abdulaziz	Comedy	
Amir El Zalam (Prince of Darkness)	Rami Imam	Adel Emam, Shereen Seif El-Nasr, Youssef Dawoud, Reda Hamed	Black comedy	
Africano	Amr Arafa	Ahmed El Sakka, Mona Zaki, Samir Chamas	Adventure / comedy	
2003
El Tagrubah El Danemarkiyyah (The Danish Experience)	Ali Idris	Adel Emam, Nicole Saba	Comedy	
Film Hindi (An Indian Movie)	Mounir Reda	Ahmed Adam, Salah Abdallah, Menna Shalabi, Rasha Mahdy	Comedy	
Kalem Mama (Talk to Mom)	Ahmad Awwadh	Mai Ezz Eldin, Abla Kamel, Menna Shalabi	Comedy	
Ma'ali al Wazir (His Highness the Minister)	Samir Seif	Ahmad Zaki, Hisham Abdul Hamid	Drama	
2004
Alexandria... New York	Youssef Chahine	Yousra, Mahmoud Hemida	Drama	Screened at the 2004 Cannes Film Festival
Aris Min Geha Amneya (A Groom from the Security Entity)	Ali Idris	Adel Emam, Hala Shiha, Sherif Mounir, Lebleba	Comedy	
Bab El Shams (The Gate of Sun)	Yousry Nasrallah	Hiam Abbass	War / drama	Screened at the 2004 Cannes Film Festival
Baheb el cima (I Love Cinema)	Osama Fawzy	Mahmoud Hemida, Laila Elwi, Menna Shalabi	Comedy / drama	
Tito	Tarek Al Eryan	Ahmed El Sakka, Hanan Tork	Action	
2005
El-Sefara Fi El-Omara (The Embassy is in the Building)	Amr Arafa	Adel Emam, Dalia El Behery	Political Comedy	
Dunia	Jocelyne Saab	Hanan Tork, Mohamed Mounir	Drama	
Sayed El Atefy (Romantic Sayed)	Ali Ragab	Tamer Hosny, Nour, Abla Kamel	Comedy	
2006
Emaret Yacoubian (The Yacoubian Building)	Marwan Hamed	Adel Emam, Nour El-Sherif, Hend Sabri, Yousra, Mohamed Imam	Drama	
Halim	Sherif Arafa	Ahmad Zaki, Mona Zaki, Jamal Suliman, Sulaf Fawakherji	Musical biography / drama	Ahmad Zaki's last film
Mohema Sa'ba (A Difficult Mission)	Ehab Radi	Tarek Allam, Majdi Kamel, Ola Ghanem	Action / thriller	
Wingrave	Ahmed Khalifa	Ashraf Hamdi, Diana Brauch, Karim Higazy	Horror	The first English-Language Egyptian feature film in history
2007
Ahlam Haqiqeya (Real Dreams)	Mohamed Gomaa	Hanan Tork, Khaled Saleh	Mystery	
Ein Shams	Ibrahim El-Batout	Hanan Youssef, Ramadan Khater	Drama	
Esabet Al-Doctor Omar (Dr Omar's Gang)	Ali Idris	Mostafa Amar, Yasmin Abdulaziz	Comedy	
Fi shaket Masr El Gedeeda (In the Heliopolis Flat)	Mohamed Khan	Ghada Adel, Khaled Abol Naga	Drama / romance	
Heya Fawda (This Is Chaos)	Youssef Chahine, Khaled Youssef	Khaled Saleh, Menna Shalabi	Drama / crime	
Keda Reda (This is good)	Ahmed Nader Galal	Ahmed Helmy, Menna Shalabi	Romantic comedy	
Morgan Ahmed Morgan	Ali Idris	Adel Emam, Mervat Amin, Basma, Sherif Salama, Ahmed Mekky	Comedy	
Natacha Atlas, la rose pop du Caire	Fleur Albert	Natacha Atlas	Documentary	
2008
Asef Ala Al Izaag (Sorry for the Disturbance)	Khaled Marei	Ahmed Helmy, Menna Shalabi, Mahmoud Hamida, Dalal Abdel Aziz	Comedy / mystery	
Basra	Ahmed Rashwan	Bassem Samra, Yara Goubran, Eyad Nassar	Drama	
El Gezira	Sherif Arafa	Ahmed El Sakka, Mahmoud Yassin, Hend Sabry, Zeina, Mahmoud AbdelAziz		
El Rayes Omar Harb	Khaled Youssef	Hany Salama, Khaled Saleh, Somaya Elkhashab, Ghada Abdelrazek		
The Promise (2008 film) (The Promise)	Mohamed Yassine	Asser Yassin, Ruby, Mahmoud Yassine	Drama	
Genenet al asmak (Aquarium)	Yousry Nasrallah	Amr Waked, Hend Sabri, Gamil Ratib	Drama	
H Dabour	Ahmed ElGendi	Ahmed Mekky, Hasan Hosni, Ingy Wegdan, Hala Fakher, Lotfy Labeeb, Sameh Husian, Mohamed AbdelMo'ty	Comedy	
Hassan wa Morcus (Hassan and Marcus)	Ramy Imam	Adel Emam, Omar Sharif, Lebleba, Mohamed Imam	Drama	
Leilet El-Baby Doll (The BabyDoll Night)	Adel Adeeb	Nour El-Sherif, Mahmoud Abdel Aziz, Laila Elwi	Drama	
Toul Omry (All My Life)	Maher Sabry	Ashraf Sewailam, Mazen, Jwana, Bassam Kassab,	Drama	The first unapologetic film to deal openly with homosexuality in the Arab world
Zay El Naharda (On A Day Like Today)	Amr Salama	Basma, Ahmed El Fishawy	Mystery	
2009
1000 Mabrouk (congratulations)	Ahmed Nader Galal	Ahmed Helmy, Mahmoud Fishawi, Laila Ezz El-Arab	Comedy / drama	
Al-Musafir (The Traveller)	Ahmad Maher	Omar Sharif, Khaled El Nabawy, Cyrine Abdelnour, Amr Waked, Basma, Christine Solomon	Drama	
Bobbos	Wael Ehsan	Adel Emam, Yousra, Ashraf Abdel Baqi, May Kassab	Comedy	
Dokkan Shehata (Shehata's Store)	Khaled Youssef	Haifa Wehbe	Drama	Lebanese singer Wehbe's first Egyptian movie
Ehki ya shahrazade (Scheherazade, Tell Me a Story)	Yousry Nasrallah	Mona Zaki	Drama	
Heliopolis	Ahmad Abdalla	Khaled Abol Naga, Hanan Motwea, Hany Adel, Hend Sabri, Yosra El Lozy, Christine Solomon	Drama	
Welaad El Am (Cousins)	Sherif Arafa	Karim Abd El Aziz, Mona Zaki, Sherif Muneer	Action / drama	
