= Nour (actress) =

Lebanese actress

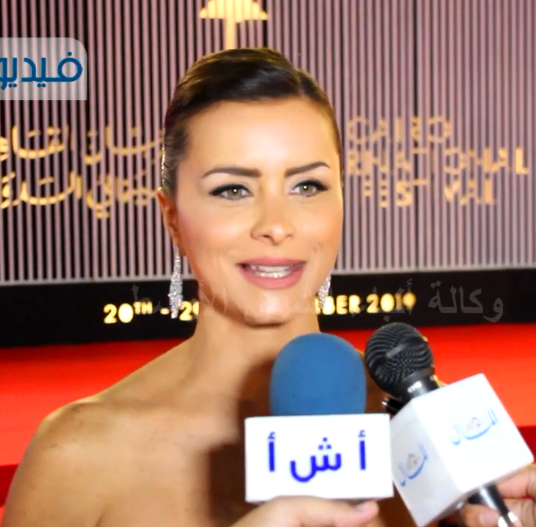
- Nour in 2019
- Born: Marian Phillip Abi Habib; 23 December 1977 (age 48); Roumieh, Lebanon
- Occupations: Actress, model
- Years active: 1987–present
- Spouse: Youssef Antaki (m. 2008; died 2026)
- Children: 2

Marianne Phillip Abi Habib (Arabic: ماريان فيليب أبي حبيب; born 23 December 1977), known as Nour (Arabic: نور), is a Lebanese actress who is known for her acting roles in Egyptian blockbuster films.

== Career ==
Born in Roumieh, Nour studied at the Faculty of Fine Arts at the Lebanese University. She began her career as an advertisement model. Her first role in cinema was in the Egyptian movie of Short w Fanella w Cap. She also acted in Ezay Tekhalley al Banat Tehabak, Zarf Tarek, Matab Sena'ee and al-Rahina (The Hostage). She also starred in the Egyptian TV series of al-Ameel 1001 (Agent 1001). In 2014, she recommenced acting after a five-year break in Saraya Abdeen.

== Personal life ==
In 2008, Nour married Youssef Antaki, with whom she has two children, Leonardo and Lydia. Her husband died in early March 2026.

== Her work ==
=== Movies ===
Released	Movie	Character	Featuring
2000	Short we-fanela we-kab	Rabab	Ahmed El Sakka, Sherif Mounir, Dalia Moustafa, Ahmed Eid, Samy El-adl
2001	Ashab wlla Business	Salma	Hany Salama, Moustafa Amar
2002	Ezay Tekhalley al Banat Tehabak	Nada	Hany Salama, Hend Sabry, Ahmed Eid, Somaya El Khashab
2003	Okal	Sherook	Mohamed Saad, Hassan Hosny
2004	Sana ola nasb	Nour	Ahmed Ezz, Dalia El Behery, Khaled Selim
2005	Malaki Isknidiryah	Laila	Ahmed Ezz, Khaled Saleh, Ghada Adel
2006	El Rahina	Erina Ivanovic	Ahmed Ezz, Yasmin Abdulaziz, Salah Abdulallah, Sameh El-Serity
2006	Zarf tarek	Sara	Ahmed Helmy, Magdi Kamel, Khaled El-Sawi, Mais Hamdan
2008	Matab Sena'y	May	Ahmed Helmy, Ezzat Abou Aouf, Ahmed Saeed Abdel-Alghani
2007	Kashf hesab	Soha	Khaled Abol Naga, Basma Ahmed, Randa El Behery
2007	Noqtat Rojoo	Laila	Sherif Mounir, Haidy Karam
2009	Mekano	Amira	Taim Hasan, Khaled Mahmoud
2016	Men 30 Sana	Rasha	Ahmed El Sakka, Sherif Mounir, Mervat Amin, Mona Zaki
2017	Tesbah Ala Kheir	Aaida	Tamer Hosny, Dorra Zarrouk, Mai Omar

== TV series ==
Released	Movie	Character	Featuring
2005	Al-ameel 1001 (Agent 1001)	Haidi	Moustafa Shaaban, Nelly Karim, Abd-Elrahman Abo Zahra, Khairia Ahmed
2008	Domooa Al-kamar (The Moon's Tears)	Ahlam	Maiatem, Riad Elkholy, Hatem Zo Elfakar
2009	Ganat Iblis (The Devil's Heaven)	Hala	Sherif Salama, Hasan Hosni, Riad Elkholy, Yasser Galal
2014	Saraya Abdeen	Feryal Hanem	Yousra, Kosai Khauli, Nelly Karim, Ghada Adel, Sosan Arshid, Mai Ksab
2014	El Excellence	Mariam	Ahmed Ezz, Ahmed Rezk, Menna Fadali, Salah Abdallah
2018	Rahim	Dalia	Yasser Galal, Mohamed Riad, Tarek Abdelazziz, Hasan Hosni
2020	The Prince	Ola	Mohamed Ramadan (actor and singer), Ahmed Zaher and Rogeena.
