= List of Egyptian films of 1990 =

A list of films produced in Egypt in 1990. For an A-Z list of films currently on Wikipedia, see Category:Egyptian films.

Title	Director	Cast	Genre	Notes
Al-raqissa wa-l-siyasi (The Belly Dancer and the Politician)	Samir Seif	Nabila Ebeid, Salah Qabeel	Drama	
Hanafy Al-Obaha (Hanafy the Wonderful)	Mohamed Abdel Aziz	Adel Emam, Farouk Al Fishawy	Comedy	
Iskandariyah Kaman wa Kaman (Alexandria Again and Forever)	Youssef Chahine	Hussein Fahmy, Yousra	Drama	
Jazeerat Al-Shaytan (The Devil's Island)	Nader Galal	Adel Emam, Yousra	Adventure / Comedy	
Kaboria (Crab)	K. Bishara	Ahmad Zaki, Raghda	Drama	
The Scorpion	Adel Awad	Sherihan	Drama	
