= Ma'ali al Wazir =

Ma'ali Al Wazir
- Directed by: Samir Seif
- Screenplay by: Wahid Hamed
- Starring: Ahmed Zaki; Yousra; Lebleba
- Cinematography: Ramses Marzouk
- Edited by: Dina Farouk
- Music by: Khaled Hammad
- Production company: Egyptian Media Production City
- Distributed by: Egyptian Media Production City
- Release date: February 2, 2003 (Egypt)
- Running time: 100 Mins
- Country: Egypt
- Language: Egyptian Arabic
- Box office: £E3,371,313

Ma'ali Al Wazir (Arabic: معالي الوزير, lit. 'His Excellency the Minister') is a 2003 Egyptian film written by Wahid Hamed and directed by Samir Seif. It stars Ahmed Zaki. The film is produced and distributed by Egyptian Media Production City, and released on 2 February 2003.

== Plot ==
Rafat Rostom becomes a minister by a mistake as they mistake him for another person with the same name, and he starts having intense nightmares about his health and his family. Ra’fat asks his office manager Ateya to accompany him on a vacation to fight these nightmares. he finds out that sleeping in mosques and in police custody keeps him away from nightmares. Ra’fat decides finally to consult a psychiatrist, so he tells Ateya all his secrets and asks him to go to the psychiatrist and act on his behalf. ultimately Ra’fat gets paranoid that Ateya will sell his secrets to the media, so he request to have Ateya killed by a hitman.

== Cast ==
- Ahmed Zaki: (Raafat Rostom)
- Yousra: (Zahra Fouad)
- Lebleba: (Fawqiya, Raafat Rostom's wife)
- Hesham Abdel Hamid: (Atiya)
- Omar Al-Hariri: (Prime Minister *Hussein El Ahmadi)
- Mimi Gamal: (Hanan)
- Hagag Abdel Azim: (Tarek, police station chief)
- Ahmed Aql: (Imam of the mosque)
- Raouf Mostafa: (Shawky, assistant to the Prime Minister)
- Tamer Abdel Moneim: (Kamel, police station officer)
- Safwa: (dancer)
- Mofeed Fawzy: (TV interviewer)
- Salma El Shamaa: (media personality)
- Rola Mahmoud: (Raafat Rostom's daughter)
- Karim El Husseiny: (Raafat Rostom's son)
- Einas El Naggar: (night girl)

== Awards ==
Ma'ali Al Wazir won 6 awards in 51st Egyptian Catholic Center for Cinema Festival, it won:

- Best film
- Best actor
- Best screenplay
- Best director

== See also ==
- List of Egyptian films of the 2000s
- Lists of Egyptian films
- Cinema of Egypt
