= Saraya Abdeen =

Television series

- Genre: Drama; Historical
- Written by: Heba Meshari Hamada
- Directed by: Amr Arafa; Shadi Abu Al-Oyoun Al-Soud
- Starring: Qusai Khouli; Yousra; Nour; Nelly Karim; May Kassab; Ghada Adel
- Composer: Fahir Atakoglu
- Original languages: Arabic; Turkish
- No. of seasons: 2
- No. of episodes: 40

Production
- Executive producer: Pierre Subeh
- Producer: Mahmoud Shokri
- Cinematography: Wael Darwish
- Editor: Mootaz Al-Kateb
- Running time: 50 minutes
- Production company: Middle East Broadcasting Center

Original release
- Network: MBC 1 MBC Masr
- Release: June 29, 2014

Related
- Middle East Broadcasting Center; O 3 Productions

Saraya Abdeen (Arabic: سرايا عابدين) is an Egyptian historical TV drama series, The first season was aired on MBC on 29 June 2014, written by Kuwaiti author Heba Meshari Hamada, directed by Amr Arafa, produced by Mahmood Shokri, and starring Qusai Khouli, Yousra, Nour, May Kassab, Ghada Adel and Nelly Karim. A second season was released in April 2015 which was directed by Shadi Abu Al-Oyoun Al-Soud.

== Plot ==
The series focuses on life of Ismail Pasha who was the Khedive of Egypt and Sudan from 1863 to 1879, with his wives and concubines and their Intrigues on each other with their servants and slaves.

== Cast ==
- Qusai Khouli as Isma'il Pasha
- Yousra as Hoshiyar Qadin
- Nour as Ferial Qadin
- Nelly Karim as Princess Safinaz and her twin sister Julnar
- May Kassab as Shafaq Nur Hanim
- Ghada Adel as Concubine Shams Qadin
- Reem Mustafa as Concubine Shams Qadin (2nd season)
- Sawsan Arsheed as Jeshm Afet Hanim
- Alaa Mursi as Sulayman
- Dalia Mostafa as Narges
- Carmen Lebbos as Nazli
- Nabil Issa as Detective Ismail
- Mahmood Al-Bazawi as Abdu
- Anoushka as Kali Mami
- Khaled Sarhan as Mustafa Fadhel
- Salah Abdallah as Palace doctor
- Abdul Hakim Qafttan as Fakhr Al-Deen
- Nahed El Sebai as Nakhla
- Yosef Fawzi as Rostom
- Safaa Al-Tookhi as Sur khanem
- Nahir Amin as Dada Ahraqat
- Enji Al-Muqqadem as Qamar
- Mayar Al-Ghitti as Nashaa Del
- Mennah Arfa as Nafisa
- Ahmad Samir as Omer
- Rauf Mustafa as Muhammad Ali
- Samar Mursi as Shams
- Ahmad Khaled as Tewfik Pasha
- Mohammad Al-Fakhrani as Fuad I
- Marwa Mahran as Jamalat
- Abeer Faroq as Asmahan
- Shrif Layla as Ibrahim Pasha
- Muhamad Mahran as Hussein Kamel
- Rania Shahin as Maya
- Amr Bader as Barakat
- Ehsan Saleh as Berlentah
- Nafartari Jamal as Aziza
- Dunia Al-Masri as Jamila
- Eman Al-Sayed as Fatma
- Noor Hany as Princess Tawhida
- Wael Najem as Zenhom
- Yorgo Shalhoub as Ernest
- Rasha Amin as Maria
- Nera Aref as Nilufer
- Majdi Bader as Alewa
- Ayman Al-Shewi as Stephen
- Heba Abdul Aziz as Sophia
- Sharif Shawqi as Gustav Eiffel
- Duaa Adel as Tatiana
- Rafif Hamdi as Rayana
- Abdul Adhem Hamad Alah as Anbar
- Ola Bader as Bakinam
- Hesham Husam as Osman
- Mustafa Hamisa as Cohen
- Paul Iskandar as Palace chef Maurice
- Hatem Jamil as Etris
- Yosef Al-Asall as Ferdinand de Lesseps
- Ali Mansour as French photographer
- Mohamed El Sharnouby (season 2)

== See also ==
- List of Egyptian television series
