= Cut and Paste (film) =

- Directed by: Hala Khalil
- Written by: Hala Khalil
- Produced by: Artists Union For Cinema & Video
- Starring: Sherif Mounir; Hanan Tork; Fathy Abdel Wahab; Sawsan Badr; Marwa Mahran; Hanan Metaweh
- Music by: Tamer Karawan
- Release date: 6 December 2006 (Cairo International Film Festival)
- Running time: 105 minutes
- Country: Egypt
- Language: Arabic

Cut and Paste (Arabic: قص ولصق) is a 2006 Egyptian film written and directed by Hala Khalil. After turning thirty, Gmilla's dreams of emigrating abroad have collapsed. She meets Youssef who is also thinking of traveling and they make a pact that they will help each other to emigrate more easily. The plan goes in an unexpected direction.

== Cast ==
- Sherif Mounir as Youssef
- Hanan Tork as Gamila
- Fathy Abdel Wahab
- Sawsan Badr
- Marwa Mahran
- Hanan Metaweh
