= The Mushroom (1997 film) =

- عيش الغراب
- Directed by: Samir Seif
- Written by: Samir Seif; Salah Fouad (screenplay and dialogue)
- Starring: Nour El-Sherif; Yousra; Mustafa Metwalli; Mahmoud Kabil; Ezzat Abou Ouf; Nada Bassiouny
- Cinematography: Samir Farag
- Edited by: Salwa Bakr
- Music by: Nabil Ali Maher
- Production company: Pop Art Films
- Release date: June 9, 1997
- Running time: 110 minutes
- Country: Egypt
- Language: Arabic

The Mushroom (Arabic: عيش الغراب, transliterated as Eish el-Ghorab) is an Egyptian crime thriller film released on June 9, 1997, by the studio Pop Art Films. The film is directed by Samir Seif and stars Nour El-Sherif, Yousra, Mustafa Metwalli, Mahmoud Kabil, Ezzat Abou Ouf, and Nada Bassiouny.

== Cast ==
- Nour El-Sherif (Mustafa Sharaf El-Din)
- Yousra (Azza al-Mansouri)
- Mustafa Metwalli (Radwan)
- Mahmoud Kabil (Big Boss)
- Ezzat Abou Auf (Akram Sabry)
- Nada Bassiouny (Ines)
- Ezzat al-Mashad (Helmy Abdelhafez)
- Amr Mahdi (Giuliano)
- Sabina (Jackie)
- Yasser Shalaby
- Hussein Mounir
- Ashraf Salah
- Ahmed Fouad
- Jamal Shaheen
- Bahjat al-Samri
- Nowruz Hani

== Synopsis ==
Mustafa Sharaf El-Din, an officer in President Anwar Sadat’s bodyguard, is humiliated by his failure to prevent the President’s assassination, in which Mustafa is wounded. Feeling sidelined at work, he drinks his failure away and is divorced by his wife, Dr. Azza al-Mansouri from the Ministry of Foreign Affairs, who was unable to get him sober and takes their daughter Maryam with her.

Azza remarries to a businessman named Akram Sabry, a connection that together with her Foreign Ministry career gets her named Permanent Representative to the United Nations. Akram owns a tourist resort in Nuweiba and trades stocks, but that is a front for more nefarious pursuits, including arms trafficking, in which he is always accompanied by his bodyguard Giuliano. Amidst the dissolution of the Soviet Union, Akram buys a load of weapons-grade plutonium for one million dollars and sets out to sell it for fifty million to the highest bidder, be it a terrorism sponsor or even a terrorist group itself. He hides the contraband in a cave on the Sinai Peninsula, not far from the resort, and hires burly Bedouin guards to protect both the fuel rods and drugs placed as a decoy.

Word of the deal spreads, and the Egyptian authorities seek to keep the matter a secret until the time is opportune to seize the plutonium, in part to protect the profits of the tourism industry, and foreign governments try to buy it to keep it out of terrorist hands, including that of Israel. An international mission, led by a man known only as the “Big Boss,” resorts to entrapping Akram by impersonating journalists for an Arab television station and heading to his house for an ostensible interview with Azza on her appointment to Permanent Representative. The gambit goes awry when the team drugs and kidnaps Maryam, believing her to be Akram's daughter. Azza calls the police, but on Akram's return he tells the officers that the girl had been released upon their calling him when they realized she wasn't Akram's daughter.

Questioning Akram's story, Azza turns to the hopelessly drunken Mustafa, who tries to save himself and his daughter with the help of his old school friend Radwan. While Radwan rehabilitates Mustafa and retrains him to shoot, the Big Boss calls Azza to convince her that Akram should sell them the plutonium, and she tells them that Maryam was not his daughter. Mustafa contacts a former partner on the force, Hossam, who works in private security and contracts with Akram's resort, to investigate his workplace, and he reports little of suspicion except for an assistant named Jackie who is carrying food and ammunition to the desert. Following Jackie leads Mustafa to the caves, where his binoculars catch the guards and the drugs, which he reveals to an unconvinced Azza. Major General Helmy Abdelhafez, Assistant Minister of State Security, summons Mustafa and Azza after spotting their investigations, confirms the material as radioactive, and asks them to stay away.

The Big Boss meets with Akram and Azza, whence Akram agrees to sell them the material on condition that Maryam be present to discuss the price. When Azza tells Mustafa, he doesn't think Akram would fulfill his end of the bargain or trust the Big Boss. Mustafa takes matters into his own hands, getting a gun and smoke bombs from Hossam then proceeding to bring Radwan with him on a raid of the cave, in which they succeed in killing the guards and seizing the shipment. Intending to use the plutonium as collateral to get back Maryam, Mustafa informs the Big Boss of the new developments, but Akram captures the Big Boss and demands twenty million dollars to keep quiet about the kidnapping, of which the Big Boss only offers one million. Mustafa and the Big Boss agree on the Citadel of Cairo as the exchange spot, and the police watch from afar as Giuliano kidnaps Maryam and shoots Radwan on his boat, then commandeers it to take both the girl and the fuel to what is Giuliano's native Israel. Mustafa chases Giuliano down and shoots him after Radwan has turned the boat around, Akram is arrested, and Azza divorces him and travels with Maryam to America, inviting Mustafa to join them now that he has become sober and regained her respect.
