= Ghada Adel =

Egyptian actress (born 1974)

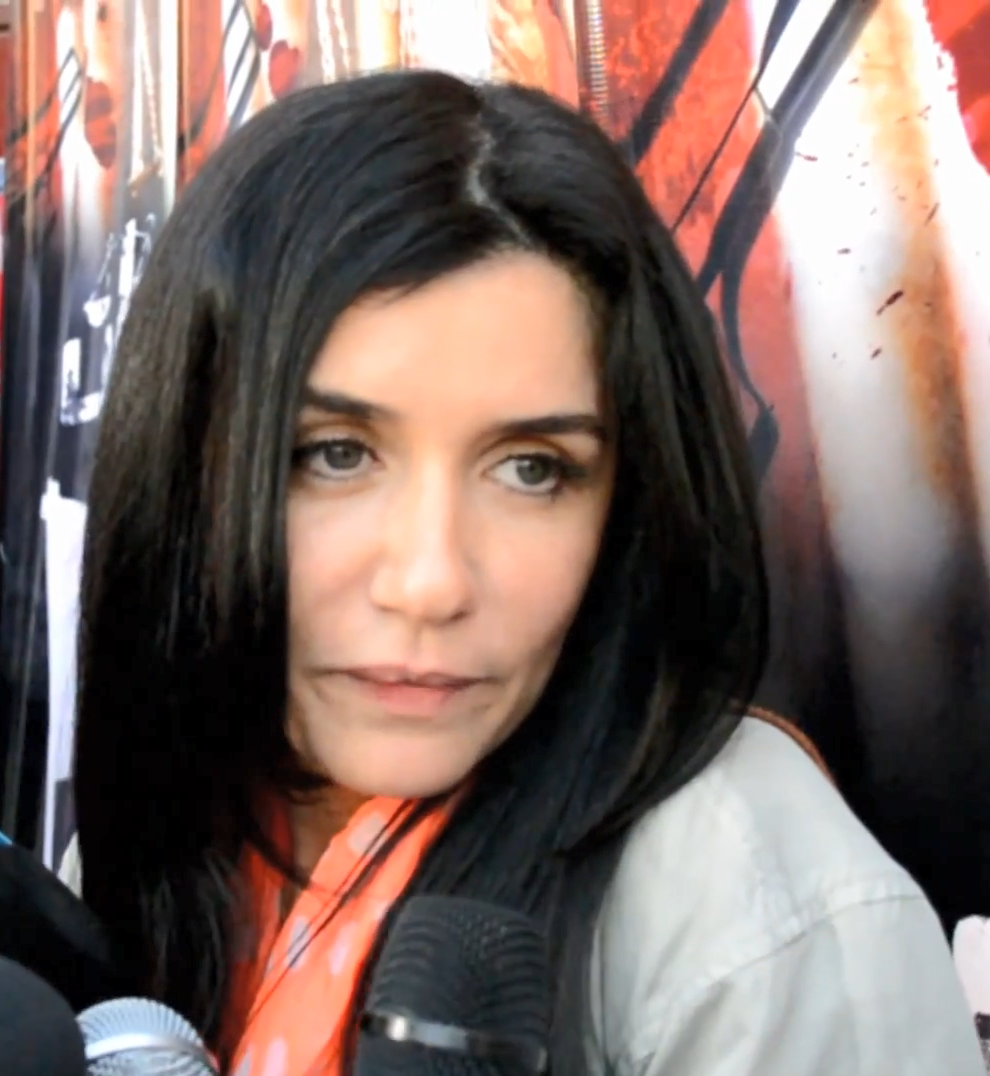
- Ghada Adel in 2016
- Born: Ghada Adel Ibrahim غادة عادل إبراهيم; 25 December 1974 (age 51); Benghazi, Libya
- Other name: Ghada Adel
- Education: University of Benghazi (business administration and commerce, bachelor)
- Years active: 1997–present
- Spouse: Magdy El-Hawary (m. 1998; div. 2018)
- Children: 5
- Relatives: Shams al-Baroudi (maternal aunt); Reem al-Baroudi (cousin)

Ghada Adel Ibrahim (Arabic: غادة عادل إبراهيم, born 25 December 1974) is an Egyptian actress.

== Early life ==
She was born in Benghazi, Libya, to an Egyptian working family. Her Egyptian mother was also the half-sister of the retired actress Shams el-baroudi via their mother. Her birth-mother died when she was only two years old, so she and her siblings stayed with their father and his second wife in Libya where her father worked, though they spent their annual holidays back home in Cairo. She has an older brother and three younger half-sisters. She graduated from the University of Benghazi after studying business administration and commerce. She began modeling in ads, appeared with Hany Shaker in 1997's Tekhsary, then hosted the television show Fawazir abyad wa aswad.

== Career ==
Her first role was in the TV series Zizinya in 1997, and her first movie was a classic comedy Saʽidi in American University in 1998 with Mohamed Henedi. She acted in main roles in many movies, including Belyah and his High Mind in 2000, El basha telmeez in 2004 with Karim Abd El-Aziz, Lover Boys in 2005 with Hamada Helal, She Made Me Criminal in 2006 with Ahmed Helmy and Hassan Hosny, and Ahwak in 2015 with Tamer Hosny.

She also acted in many TV series, including Mabrouk Galak Ala'a in 2005 with Hany Ramzy, Dead Heart in 2008 with Sherif Mounir and Saraya Abden in 2015 with Qusai Khouli.

In 2019, she went viral on many social media platforms for her daring look at El Gouna Film Festival.

== Personal life ==
Her aunt is the retired actress Shams El Baroudi. She was married for 20 years to Egyptian director and producer Magdy El Hawari, who also helped introduce her to several movies. They have five children, four sons and one daughter. She announced her divorce from him after a year of separation.

== Works ==
=== Films ===
- Saʽidi in American University (1998)
- Abboud on Borders (1999)
- Belyah and his High Mind (2000)
- 55 Ambulance (2001)
- Albasha Altemeth (2004)
- Private Alexandria (2005)
- Lover Boys (2005)
- Hamada Playing (2005)
- She Made Me Criminal (2006)
- In the Heliopolis Flat (2007)
- Neama Bay (2007)
- Klashinkov (2008)
- Son of Consul (2010)
- The Chord (2010)
- Over my Dead Body (2013)
- Ahwak (2015)
- Horob Eterary 1 (2017)
- Horob Eterary 2 (2018)
- Casablanca (2019)
- Secret Men Club (2019)
- 200 Pounds (2021)
- 11:11 (2022)

=== TV Series ===
- Zezenya (1997)
- Moon Face (2000)
- Mabrouk Galak Ala (2005)
- Radio Star (2005)
- Almasrawiya 1 (2007)
- Dead Heart (2008)
- Public Secret (2012)
- The Mayor Wedding (2012)
- A Place in Palace (2014)
- Saraya Abdeen (2015)
- The Covenant: Permissible Words (2015)
- The Balance (2016)
- Adli Alam Demons (2017)

=== Radio Series ===
- The Line with You (2007)
- Thursday or Friday (2008)
- Sheireef Rebelna El khafif (2009)
- For Egypt (2010)
- Reya wa Meskena (2017)

=== TV shows ===
- White and Black (1997)
- Khalik Jaree (2001)
- Drink Tea (2017)

=== Music Videos ===
- Habeboni Fek (1994) with Amer Mounib
- Rajeen (1995) with Amr Diab
- Tekhsary (1997) Hany Shaker
- Oyoun Sood (1999) to Laila Ghofran
