= 30 Years Ago =

2016 film

- Directed by: Amr Arafa
- Written by: Ayman Bahgat Kamar
- Produced by: Walid Mansour
- Starring: Ahmed El Sakka; Mona Zaki; Sherif Mounir; Mervat Amin; Nour
- Music by: Fahir Atakoğlu
- Production company: Talent Media Productions
- Release date: 6 July 2016
- Running time: 2h 25min
- Country: Egypt
- Language: Egyptian Arabic

30 Years Ago (Arabic: من 30 سنة, translit. Men Thalateen Sana) is a 2016 Egyptian drama film directed by Amr Arafa. The film features an ensemble cast. It stars Ahmed El Sakka, Mona Zaki, Sherif Mounir, Mervat Amin and Nour.

== Plot ==
Abdel Tawab El-Tayeb, an arms dealer from Minya, Egypt, who lost both of his wives. He sold his property and gathered his children: Hassan, Gamal, Nabila, Sameh, and Hoda and moved to Cairo to open an arms store in Attaba neighborhood and married the dancer Sonia. They had a daughter, Nagwa, and his business flourished. Before his death, he divided his wealth equally among his children, leaving his eldest daughter, Nabila, as his guardian. She allied with the other siblings to oppress Sameh and Hoda and seize their inheritance. Sameh's son, Omar, lived in poverty and emigrated abroad in search of a livelihood. Hoda's son, Emad, worked as a literary critic but struggled with poverty. Hassan continued his arms trade and lets his daughter, Noha marries the largest arms dealer in Port Said to capitalize on his wealth. Meanwhile, Hassan's son, Selim, caused problems in his friend's life and led to a betrayal between him and his fiancée. As for Gamal, he continued to trade arms with his brother Hassan, and his daughter Rasha, who fell in love with Omar, joined them in the business. Sonia's daughter, Nagwa, pursued relationships with younger men, which led to her son Hani's drug addiction. Through the publisher Hisham, Emad met the poet Hanan, who moved to Cairo in search of a better opportunity.

Fifteen years later, Omar returned from abroad after becoming a billionaire, only to discover he was infertile. He decided to liquidate his business and distribute his wealth among his family members. During this time, he met Hanan and helped her financially, but Majzoub told him he would kill nine family members. This led to a series of bloody events that claimed the lives of many family members.

Hani died under a train, followed by Nabila who fell from the balcony of their house, then Selim and Noha who suffocated from gas. Hassan then committed suicide after learning of the deaths of his children. Rasha tried to fall in love with Omar, coveting his wealth, and married him. However, a horrific accident occurred after their marriage, resulting in the deaths of Gamal, Rasha, and Nagwa, leaving Omar and Emad alive. After these incidents, Emad left the country, fearing Al-Majzoub's warnings, but he returned to find that Hanan had married Omar. The story ended with a conspiracy between Emad and Hanan to get rid of each other. At the end, Emad was executed, and Hanan enjoyed the inheritance of the whole family.

== Cast ==
- Ahmed El Sakka as Emad
- Mona Zaki as Hanan
- Sherif Mounir as Omar
- Mervat Amin as Nagwa
- Nour as Rasha
- Salah Abdallah as Hassan
- Jamila Awad as Noha
- Mohamed Mahran as Selim
- Ragaa El Geddawy as Nabila
- Mahmoud El Bezzawy as the Homeless Man
- Mahmoud el-Gendy as Ibrahim
- Mohamed Mrzaban as the lawyer
- Suliman Eid as Abdo
