= Flight 404 (film) =

- Theatrical release poster
- Egyptian Arabic: رحلة ٤٠٤
- Literally: Flight 404
- Directed by: Hany Khalifa
- Written by: Mohamed Ragaa
- Produced by: Mohamed Hefzy
- Starring: Mona Zaki
- Cinematography: Fawzi Darwish
- Music by: Suad Bushnaq
- Production companies: Lagoonie Film Production; Film Clinic; Arabia Pictures Entertainment; Hi Media Production
- Release date: 25 January 2024 (Egypt)
- Country: Egypt
- Language: Egyptian Arabic
- Box office: $4.03 million

Flight 404 (Arabic: 404 الرحلة, romanized: Rehla 404) is a 2024 Egyptian thriller drama film directed by Hani Khalifa starring Mona Zaki, with a script by Mohamed Ragaa, and produced by Mohamed Hefzy. It was selected as the Egyptian submission for the Best International Feature Film at the 97th Academy Awards, but was not nominated.

== Plot ==
Ghada (Zaki) attempts to obtain money for her mother's sudden emergency surgery while preparing to depart Egypt to perform the Hajj. She is forced to reconnect with people from her past and make difficult ethical decisions.

== Cast ==
- Mona Zaki as Ghada
- Mohamed Farrag
- Mohamed Mamdouh
- Shereen Reda
- Khaled El-Sawy
- Mohamed Alaa
- Hassan Al-Adl
- Sama Ibrahim
- Shadi Alfons
- Rana Raies
- Gihan el Shamashergy
- Arfa Abdel Rassoul

== Production ==
According to Zaki, she was first introduced to the script in 2013 when she was filming the Asia television series and immediately loved it, but was committed to other projects at the time.

It is the first Egyptian film to be filmed in Saudi Arabia.

In 2015 Ragaa's script received a Sawiris Cultural Award for young writers and screenwriters.

== Soundtrack ==
The soundtrack includes 15 original songs by Jordanian-Canadian film composer Suad Bushnaq In addition, a new arrangement of 'Ya Rayehin Lil-Nabi', the famous 1953 song from iconic Egyptian singer Layla Murad appears in the closing credits. The song sparked such interest among cinema-goers that the producers of the film released some background notes after the film's release.

'Ya Rayehin Lil-Nabi' is based on one of the most famous Sufi poems by Rabia Basri, an Arab Muslim saint and one of the earliest Sufi mystics. The idea of using the song, originally composed by Riad Al Sunbati and Abo El Seoud El Ebiary for Murad, was conceived by the film's director and writer and to align with the film's key plot events. Music producer Kareem Gaber, also known as “Al Waili”, was brought on board to create a fresh and original arrangement while preserving the presence of Murad's voice and integrating the vocals of Nada Abbas.

== Reception ==
=== Box office ===
In Egypt, the film grossed more than six million Egyptian pounds (approximately $123,390) within the first week of its January 25 release and twenty million Egyptian pounds (approximately $411,300) by the end of its theatrical run, breaking Egyptian box office records for a female-led film.

Within the first month of its release, the film counted 450,000 admissions across the Middle East and North Africa (MENA) region. In Saudi Arabia, the region's biggest market, Flight 404 led the Saudi box office for four weeks in a row, grossing $4 million with 280,000 admissions.

In the UAE, the film grossed over $500,000 by the end of its theatrical run in March.

It was released in theaters in the United States and Canada through AM Media on February 23, 2024.

== Awards and nominations ==
The film won the Special Jury Award (Tutankhamun’s Silver Mask), and the Best Actress Award for Mona Zaki at the 13th edition of the Luxor African Film Festival.

== See also ==
- List of submissions to the 97th Academy Awards for Best International Feature Film
- List of Egyptian submissions for the Academy Award for Best International Feature Film
