= Al Do' El Shared =

- Native name: Al Do' El Shared الضوء الشارد
- No. of episodes: 30

Release
- Original release: 20 December 1998

Al Do' El Shared (Egyptian Arabic: الضوء الشارد) is an Egyptian TV series that was aired during 1998. It starred Mamdouh Abdel-Aleem, Samiha Ayoub, Mohamed Riad, Youssef Shaaban, Rania Farid Shawqi, and began production in January 1998.

== Plot ==
The story tells that there was a man named Abdel-Ghafoor Al-Barai, who was poor, so he was appointed to a merchant of khorda and earned from him the craft and excelled in the field of khorda. He got married, and his wife gave birth to four daughters and a son named Abdul-Wahhab. From divorce, he returned to his mother and father, he was very happy, so he married his aunt's daughter, and he lived his life happily, and they lived in hibernation and vegetation.

== Cast ==
- Mamdouh Abdel-Alim: (Rafia Sultan Al-Azayzi)
- Samiha Ayoub: (Wanisa)
- Youssef Shaaban: (Wehbe Al-Sawalmy)
- Mona Zaki: (Farha)
- Rania Farid Shawki:(Nafisa Wehbe Al-Sawalmy)
- Mohammed Ryad: (Fares Sultan Al-Azayzi)
- Amin Hashem .Follow Favorite
- Jamal Ismai: (Farha's father)
- Good fasting:(Hamada - child)
- Salwa Khattab: (chairman)
- Samia Amin: (estate chief's mother)
- Syed Abdul Karim: (Representative Abu Al-Qasim)
- Hadi Al-Jayar Follow Favorite Sumaya al-Khashab: (Survival)
- Rashwan Tawfiq :(Sheikh Zahran - guest speaker).

== crew ==
- Screenplay and dialogue: > Mohamed Safaa
- Soundtrack:> Yasser Abdel Rahman
- Director of Photography: Mahmoud Zuhdi
- Production Director: Hamdi Zain
- Directed by: Majdi Abu Amira
- Produced by: The Voice of Cairo.

== Film festivals and commercial releases ==
Many commercials were aired on MBC 1, Drama, and Masr.

The cast won an award at the Al Ahram Festival.

== See also ==
- List of Egyptian television series
