= Wahid Hamed =

Egyptian screenwriter (1944–2021)

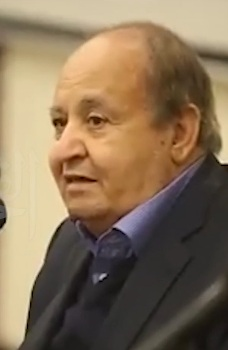
- Hamed in 2019
- Born: July 1, 1944; Beni Quraysh, Sharqia Governorate, Egypt
- Died: January 2, 2021 (aged 76); Cairo, Egypt
- Occupation: Screenwriter
- Years active: 1974–2021

Wahid Hamed (Arabic: وحيد حامد; 1 July 1944 – 2 January 2021) was an Egyptian screenwriter.

== Personal life ==
Hamed was born in Beni Quraysh, Sharqia Governorate. He moved to Cairo in 1963 to study in the Department of Sociology at Cairo University.

He was married to Zeinab Sweidan, with whom he had his son, Marwan.

== Work as a screenwriter ==
According to Egypt Independent; "Hamed was concerned with Egyptian society and important issues within the country, and was able to eloquently narrate Egypt’s conditions, dreams, and history." He worked with a number of directors, including Samir Seif, Sherif Arafa and Atef El-Tayeb. He won several awards for his work. In 2020, he won the Golden Pyramid Appreciation Award from the 42nd Cairo International Film Festival for Lifetime Achievement.

== Death ==
Hamed died on 2 January 2021 at the age of 76 in Cairo, Egypt.
