= Amr Arafa =

Egyptian filmmaker

Amr Arafa عمرو عرفة
- Born: Amr Arafa; 9 December 1962 (age 63); Cairo, Egypt
- Occupation: Director
- Years active: 1983–present
- Father: Saad Arafa
- Relatives: Sherif Arafa (brother)

Amr Arafa (born 9 December 1962), is an Egyptian filmmaker. Considered one of the best filmmakers in Egyptian cinema, Arafa is best known as the director of critically acclaimed award-winning films Africano, Zahaymar, Helm Aziz and Akher Deek Fi Masr.

== Personal life ==
He was born on 9 December 1962 in Cairo, Egypt. His father Saad Arafa was also a prolific film-maker. He made several popular films of his generation such as Al E'iteraf, Marzooka and Demoua' Fi Lailat El Zefaf.

Amr's older brother, Sherif Arafa is also a popular filmmaker in Egypt. He was born on 25 December 1960. His most notable films include, Birds of Darkness, Mafia, Halim and Welad El Am.

In 2005, Arafa moved to the United States for graduate school. Then he spent most of his time in the US for 11 years on temporary education. He also formed his own business management consulting company and, later assured green card in 2015.

== Career ==
He started cinema career in 1983 with the footsteps of his father. In 1991, Amr established his own production company, FinalCut Film Production. Since then, he produced and directed numerous films, commercials, TV series and documentaries.

In 2001, he directed and produced his maiden feature film Africano. The film was filmed in South Africa and made its premier on 11 July 2001 in Egypt. The film received critical acclaim and later screened in nearby African countries as well as screened in Europe. In Kuwait, the film made its premier on 31 October 2001 whereas in Greece, it was released at the Greek Film Archive on 28 February 2012.

After his successful maiden film, he continuously performed a successful directing career with the films: Akher Deek Fi Masr (2017), Men 30 Sana (2016), TV Series Saraya Abdeen (2015), Abu El Nil (2013), Helm Aziz (2011), Zahaymar (2010), Ibn el-Qunsul (2009), El Shabah (2008), Gaaltany Mogreman (2006) and El Sefara Fel Emara (2004).

== Filmography ==
Year	Film	Role	Genre	Ref.
2001	Africano	Director	Film	
2004	El Sefara Fel Emara	Director	Film	
2005	The Embassy in the Building	Director	Film	
2006	She Made Me a Criminal	Director	Film	
2007	The Ghost	Director	Film	
2008	El Shabah	Director	Film	
2010	Zahaymar	Director	Film	
2011	Ibn el-Qunsul	Director	Film	
2012	Helm Aziz	Director	Film	
2013	Samir Abu el-Nil	Director	Film	
2014	Saraya Abdeen	Director	TV series	
2016	Men 30 Sana	Director	Film	
2017	Akher Deek Fi Masr	Director	Film	
2017	Lamei Al Qott	Director	TV series	
