= Man sa yarbah 2 malyoon =

Television quiz show

- The logo and the host George Kurdahi
- Arabic: من سيربح 2 مليون
- Created by: David Briggs; Steven Knight; Mike Whitehill
- Presented by: George Kurdahi
- Countries of origin: Middle East and North Africa

Production
- Running time: 60-120 minutes

Original release
- Network: MBC1
- Release: 2005 – 2007

Fragment of the game; question

من سيربح 2 مليون (English translation: Who will win 2 million?, transliteration: Man sa yarbah 2 malyoon) is a Middle Eastern and North African game show based on the original British format of Who Wants to Be a Millionaire?.It was hosted by George Kurdahi. Top prize was SRls 2,000,000. This is the successor of the first season of Man sa yarbah al malyoon with SRls 1,000,000 as the top-prize. The first season of Man sa yarbah al malyoon premiered on November 27, 2000 to prevent the hiatus situation of the original British version of WWTBAM.

== Money tree ==
Payout structure
Question number	Question value
15	SRls 2,000,000
14	SRls 1,000,000
13	SRls 500,000
12	SRls 250,000
11	SRls 125,000
10	SRls 64,000
9	SRls 32,000
8	SRls 16,000
7	SRls 8,000
6	SRls 4,000
5	SRls 2,000
4	SRls 1,000
3	SRls 500
2	SRls 300
1	SRls 200
Milestone Top prize
