= Mustafa Fahmy (actor) =

Egyptian actor (1947–2024)

- مصطفي فهمي
- Born: Mustafa Mahmoud Fahmy; 7 August 1942; Cairo, Egypt
- Died: 30 October 2024 (aged 82); Cairo, Egypt
- Citizenship: Egyptian
- Education: Higher Institute of Cinema
- Occupation: Actor
- Years active: 1974–2024
- Relatives: Hussein Fahmy (brother), and Hassan Fahmy (brother)

Mustafa Mahmoud Fahmy (Arabic: مصطفى فهمى; 7 August 1942 – 30 October 2024) was an Egyptian actor, active in films and television for 50 years. He died on 30 October 2024, at the age of 82.

== Selected filmography ==
- 1974: Where Is My Mind?
- 1976: Face to Face
- 1983: Ayoub
- 1993: A Maid...However
- 1994: Five-Star Thieves
- 2000: The Red Rose
- 2024: Aserb: The Squadron
