= Aserb: The Squadron =

2024 Egyptian film

- Directed by: Ahmed Nader Galal
- Written by: Omar Abdel Halim
- Starring: Ahmed El Sakka; Amr Abdulgalil; Kosai Khauli
- Release date: 1 May 2024
- Running time: 101 minutes
- Country: Egypt
- Language: Arabic

Aserb: The Squadron (Arabic: السرب) is a 2024 Egyptian action film directed by Ahmed Nader Galal and written by Omar Abdel Halim. The film stars Ahmed El Sakka, Amr Abdulgalil, and Kosai Khauli. Its story is based on true events of the Egyptian National Security Agency's response to the 2015 kidnapping and beheading of Copts in Libya.

== Cast ==
- Ahmed El Sakka as Ali El Masry
- Amr Abdulgalil
- Kosai Khauli
- Hend Sabry
- Sherif Mounir as Sherif El Masry
- Diab
- Asser Yassin
- Ahmed Hatem
- Karim Fahmy
- Mahmoud Abdulmoghni
- Mona Zaki
- Asaad Al-Khateeb
- Fady Eman
- Mustafa Fahmy
- Eslam Gamal
- Mohamed Mamdouh
