= Man sa yarbah al malyoon =

Arabic TV quiz show

- Arabic: من سيربح المليون
- Genre: Quiz show
- Created by: David Briggs; Mike Whitehill; Steven Knight
- Presented by: George Kurdahi (2000-2021); Kosai Khauli (2024-present)
- Composers: Matthew Strachan; Keith Strachan; Nick Magnus (2010, 2015-16, 2021, 2024-present); Ramon Covalo (2010, 2015-16, 2021, 2024-25)
- Countries of origin: Middle East and North Africa

Production
- Production locations: Elstree Studios in Borehamwood, England (2000-2001); Saint Denis Studios in Saint Denis, France (2001-2002); Egyptian Media Production City (EMPC) in 6th of October, Egypt (2002-2004, 2015-2016); MBC Studios in Zouk Mosbeh, Lebanon (2005-2007, 2010); Warner Bros Studios in Lisbon, Portugal (2021); Sera Film Services in Istanbul, Türkiye (2024-2025); Dubai TV Studios in Dubai, UAE (2025-present)
- Running time: 46-50 minutes

Original release
- Network: MBC 1 (2000-2007, 2010, 2021); OSN Yahala (2015-2016); Dubai TV (2024-present)
- Release: 27 November 2000 – present

من سيربح المليون (English translation: Who will win the million?, transliteration: Man sa yarbah al-malyoon) is a pan-Arab quiz show, based on British Who Wants to Be a Millionaire? franchise. Its host for much of its inception was George Kurdahi. The show's original prize was one million Saudi riyals. It aired on pan-Arab television channel MBC1 from 27 November 2000 until May 2004, and was later revived by MBC as من سيربح 2 مليون, with an increased top prize of SR 2,000,000.

On 12 January 2010, MBC1 revived the show again, this time using the 12-question format that was introduced by the original UK version in 2007, as well as introducing an "extra-high-risk" format that would later be used in Russia and India, and this version had a top prize of SR 1,000,000. This version concluded on 10 August 2010, after one season. This version used a markedly new style of graphics, a slightly darker version of the blue "Rave v1"-style graphics first seen in Australia, making this the first time the graphics in this version were animated, albeit only to a basic degree. Additionally, the "Rave" soundtrack was introduced, composed by British composer Nick Magnus and Dutch composer Ramon Covalo for the British version in 2007, although this version used it less than most (the host entrance (some episode), contestant introduction and safety-net passed theme were still from the "Classic" soundtrack).

On 16 October 2015, the show was revived for a third time, this time airing on OSN Yahala and was filmed in Egypt on a set that was previously used for a local Egyptian version and a Hot Seat version that aired on Dubai TV in 2012. This version used the 15-question format, aired for one season before concluding on 8 April 2016, and had a top prize of SR 2,000,000. This version used the "Rave v3" graphics first used by the costa Rica version in 2013, and almost all of the soundtrack was the Magnus/Covalo "Rave" soundtrack.

On 18 September 2021, as part of MBC's 35th anniversary celebrations, the show was revived for a one-off special, in which pairs of celebrities would participate instead of civilians, and they would be playing for charity. This episode used the original version's payout structure, and had a top prize of SR 1,000,000. The graphics were also upgraded to graphics created by Dutch graphic designer Olga van den Brandt and which were first used in the 2019 Dutch version. Additionally, while the Magnus/Covalo "Rave" soundtrack was kept for within the game (primarily composed by Covalo), the intro, host entrance, question 6 - 7, commercial breaks, closing theme and contestant introduction theme reverted to those from the Strachans' "Classic" soundtrack, much like the Brazilian and 2009 Georgian versions.

In 2024, it was announced that the show would once again be revived, this time airing on Dubai TV, who had previously made a version based on the Hot Seat spin-off format, and this version is hosted by Syrian actor Kosai Khauli. This version premiered on 11 November 2024, and was filmed on the set of the Turkish version and using almost all of the same soundtrack choices as the Turkish version, albeit using slightly different graphics ("Olga v2.5" as opposed to Turkey's bespoke adaptation of "Olga v1", the standard variant of which was also used by the 2021 special). This version once again used the classic format, albeit without Fastest Finger First and with four lifelines being presented to the contestant at the beginning, and had a top prize of one million Emirati dirhams (similar in value to the Saudi riyal), making this the first time that a currency other than the Saudi riyal was used. The money tree is based on the classic UK money tree, but the values of the first eight questions are higher. In 2025, the series was renewed for another season, with a set in Dubai being constructed especially for the show. The set is similar in look to the Turkish set, but the lighting is slightly different and lighting effects are smoother. Also in this season, the graphics changed to the "Olga v3" graphics first used by the French version's specials in 2024, and most of the soundtrack reverted to the Strachans' "Classic" soundtrack (except intro, commercial Breaks and closing), similar to many versions of the time and all versions using the "Olga v3" graphics.

== Gameplay ==
=== Fastest Finger First ===
Originally, the show started with a pool of 10 contestants, and a preliminary game called "Fastest Finger First", in which the contestants are asked to arrange four answers in a particular order, would be played in order to determine who will be the next contestant to sit in the hot seat and play the main game and time's up the host will check the correct order and reveal the result. The person who gives the correct order in the fastest time would be next to play the main game. This way of determining contestants for the show was used in both the original version and من سيربح 2 مليون (the 2005 version), however this round is absent from the subsequent revivals of the show, starting from 2010 and instead the host directly invites contestants into the hot seat.

=== Main game ===
In the main game, the contestant is given 15 multiple choice questions, which increase in difficulty as the game progresses. Every time the contestant answers a question correctly, they win the amount of money that the question is worth, however the winnings are not cumulative (e.g. if the contestant were to answer the second question, they would win SR 200, not SR 300). Answering the final question correctly, giving a wrong answer to a question and deciding not to answer a question (known as "walking away") end the contestant's game. There are two guaranteed sums, at question 5 (SR 1,000 in the original 2000 version and the 2021 one-off special; SR 2,000 in the 2005 version; SR 10,000 in the 2015 version, AED 4,000 in the 2024 version), and at question 10 (SR 32,000 in the original 2000 version and the 2021 one-off special; SR 64,000 in the 2005 version; SR 100,000 in the 2015 version, AED 32,000 in the 2024 version), and once the contestant correctly answers that question, they are guaranteed to leave with that amount (i.e. if they were to lose on questions 6-10, they would leave with the question 5 amount, and if they were to lose on the last five questions, they would leave with the question 10 amount). If the contestant were to lose before the first guaranteed sum, they would leave with nothing. Should the contestant decide to walk away, they would leave with the value of the previous question.

The 2010 version followed a different format, with just 12 questions as opposed to the traditional 15, a format introduced in the UK in 2007, and also used an entirely new format known as the "extra-high-risk format" (later used by the Russian and Indian Hindi-language versions), in which the contestant is only given one guaranteed sum, and they are allowed to select any question between question 1 (SR 500) and question 11 (SR 500,000) to be the guaranteed sum. If they answer wrong prior to reaching their selected milestone, they will leave with nothing at all.

=== Lifelines ===
- 50:50 (2000-present)
- Phone a Friend (2000-present)
- Ask the Audience (2000-21)
- Switch the Question (2005-07; available after 1st guaranteed sum)
- Ask the Expert (2010; available after guaranteed sum)
- Ask Three of the Audience (2021; available after first guaranteed sum)
- Plus One (2024-present)
- Ask the Host (2024-present)

The contestant is given "lifelines" to help them if they get stuck on a question. Each lifeline can only be used once. In the original version, the contestant is given three lifelines at the start of their run: 50:50, which removes two incorrect answers, leaving them with the correct answer and one remaining incorrect answer; Phone a Friend, which allows the contestant to call one of their selected "friends" to see if they know the answer to the question, with 30 seconds being given for the contestant to read the question and its possible answers, and for the friend to answer; and Ask the Audience, in which the audience are polled on the question through their keypads. The 2005 version introduced an additional fourth lifeline, Switch the Question, in which the question is replaced with another one of a similar level of difficulty. This would become available once the contestant reached the first guaranteed sum. In the 2010 version, a different additional lifeline, Ask the Expert, would be unlocked once the contestant reached their guaranteed sum. This lifeline allowed the contestant to consult Saudi businessman and former columnist for Okaz Hussein Shobokshi for help on a question, with unlimited time given. The 2021 special also featured an additional lifeline, Ask Three of the Audience, which would be obtained once the contestant (or, in this case, contestants) reached their first guaranteed sum, as per Switch in the 2005 version. This lifeline would allow the contestant to ask three random audience members what they think the answer to the question is. In the 2024 version, the contestant is offered a selection of four lifelines, which the contestant has to choose three to use during their game before it begins, however Ask the Audience was not present in this version (likely due to the show initially being filmed in Turkey with a predominantly Turkish audience, though it has been a trend since around 2024 for new versions to debut without Ask the Audience), and instead a new lifeline, Plus One (in which the contestant can ask an audience member they brought along as a supporter and designated "plus-one" for their opinion to the question), replaced it, along with another new lifeline, Ask the Host (where the host Kosai Khauli is given an unlimited amount of time to state his opinion on the question).

== Money tree ==
Payout structure
Question number	Question value				
Question number	2000-2004 2021	2005-2007	2010 (risk format) (Note: In this version, there is only 1 guaranteed sum. The contestant can choose the guaranteed sum in any question except the 12th question. This is adopted in Russian version from September 2010-June 2022.)	2015-2016	2024-present
1	SR 100	SR 200	SR 500	SR 500	AED 500
2	SR 200	SR 300	SR 1,000	SR 1,000	AED 1,000
3	SR 300	SR 500	SR 2,000	SR 2,500	AED 1,500
4	SR 500	SR 1,000	SR 5,000	SR 5,000	AED 2,000
5	SR 1,000	SR 2,000	SR 10,000	SR 10,000	AED 4,000
6	SR 2,000	SR 4,000	SR 20,000	SR 20,000	AED 6,000
7	SR 4,000	SR 8,000	SR 40,000	SR 30,000	AED 8,000
8	SR 8,000	SR 16,000	SR 80,000	SR 50,000	AED 12,000
9	SR 16,000	SR 32,000	SR 150,000	SR 75,000	AED 16,000
10	SR 32,000	SR 64,000	SR 250,000	SR 100,000	AED 32,000
11	SR 64,000	SR 125,000	SR 500,000	SR 200,000	AED 64,000
12	SR 125,000	SR 250,000	SR 1,000,000	SR 350,000	AED 125,000
13	SR 250,000	SR 500,000	N/A	SR 500,000	AED 250,000
14	SR 500,000	SR 1,000,000	N/A	SR 1,000,000	AED 500,000
15	SR 1,000,000	SR 2,000,000	N/A	SR 2,000,000	AED 1,000,000

== Maghrebi version ==
من سيربح المليون (English translation: Who will win a million?, transliteration: Man sa yarbah al malyoon) was a game show broadcast in Algeria, Tunisia, Libya and Morocco based on the original British format of Who Wants to Be a Millionaire?. The show was hosted by Rachid El Ouali. The top prize of this version was €500,000, significantly higher than any of the Middle Eastern versions. من سيربح المليون was broadcast from August 2009 to September 2010 on Nessma TV. The rules are the same as in the original version, the only difference was that it didn't have the Fastest Finger First round, contestants were invited to the studio by the host. This version also used the "Rave" soundtrack and "Rave v2" graphics first used in North Macedonia in 2007 (like Rave v1, but with slightly wider lozenges, slightly slower animation and text and right/wrong answer graphics fading in, as well as no animation for the amount graphic and Verdana replacing Copperplate Gothic in almost all cases - though in this case Arial Rounded was used).

=== Money tree ===
Payout structure
Question number	Question value
1	€25
2	€50
3	€125
4	€250
5	€500
6	€1,000
7	€2,000
8	€4,000
9	€6,000
10	€10,000
11	€20,000
12	€50,000
13	€100,000
14	€200,000
15	€500,000

== Winners ==
There are 6 top prize winners (one was a pair).

- Khaled Al Mulla (UAE) - SR 1,000,000 -21 November 2001
- Mohammad Tanirah (Gaza, Palestine) - SR 1,000,000 - 15 March 2002
- Sidi Ahmed ould Ali (Mauritania) - SR 1,000,000 - 2 January 2003
- Kenaan Matar (Lebanon) - SR 2,000,000 - 15 May 2007
- Mohammad Hamzeh (Syria) - SR 1,000,000 - 23 March 2010
- Nasser Al Qasabi (Saudi Arabia) and Somaya El Khashab (Egypt) - SR 1,000,000 - 18 September 2021
