= 11:11 (film) =

- Directed by: Karim Abouzeid
- Written by: Yasser Abdel Basset
- Produced by: Ayman Naguib
- Starring: Eyad Nassar; Ghada Adel; Injy El Mokkaddem; Omar El-Shennawy; Mohamed El Sharnouby; Nour Ehab; Moataz Hisham
- Distributed by: Hisham Abdel Khaleq
- Release date: February 2, 2022 (EGY)
- Running time: 76 minutes
- Country: Egypt
- Language: Arabic
- Box office: 1,877,232 (Egypt)

11:11 is a 2022 Egyptian drama film directed by Karim Abouzeid and written by Yasser Abdel Basset. The film stars Eyad Nassar, Ghada Adel, Mohamed El Sharnouby, Nour Ehab, Moataz Hisham, and Omar El-Shennawy. It was released in Egypt on February 2, 2022.

It was the first film directed by Karim Abouzeid.

== Cast ==
- Eyad Nassar as Said
- Ghada Adel as Alia
- Mohamed El Sharnouby as Zayn
- Nour Ehab as Mai
- Moataz Hisham as Radi
- Omar El-Shennawy as Tarek
- Hind Abdel Halim as Hend
- Yasin Abu Rawash as Mando
- Injy El Mokkaddem as Nermin
- Sali Hammad as Mutazz
- Hesham Radhi as Eyad
