= The Spider (2022 film) =

2022 Egyptian film

- Movie poster
- العنكبوت
- Directed by: Ahmed Nader Galal
- Written by: Mohamed Nayer
- Starring: Ahmed El Sakka; Mona Zaki; Dhaffer L'Abidine
- Release date: 2 May 2022 (EG)
- Running time: 130 minutes
- Country: Egypt
- Language: Arabic

The Spider is a 2022 Egyptian action film directed by Ahmed Nader Galal, written by Mohamed Nayer, and starring Ahmed El Sakka, Mona Zaki and Dhaffer L'Abidine.

The film was released on Eid Al-Fitr in 2022. It is the last film in which Zaki Fatin Abdel Wahab appears.

== Cast ==
- Ahmed El Sakka as Hassan
- Mona Zaki as Laila
- Dhaffer L'Abidine
- Yosra El Lozy
- Mohamed Lotfy
- Ahmed El Saadany
- Zaki Fatin Abdel Wahab
