= Ahmed Nader Galal =

Egyptian film director (born 1970)

- أحمد نادر جلال
- Born: 13 June 1970 (age 56); Cairo, Egypt
- Occupation: Director
- Father: Nader Galal
- Relatives: Mary Queeny (grandmother); Ahmed Galal (grandfather)

Ahmed Nader Galal (born 13 June 1970) is an Egyptian film director who grew up in an artistic family. He is the son of director Nader Galal and the grandson of director Ahmed Galal, whom he is named after. His grandmother is the actress Mary Queeny.

He studied directing at the Higher Institute of Cinema in Cairo, graduating in 1997.

== Filmography ==
=== Films ===
Directed features
Year	Title	Ref.
2005	Abu Ali	
2007	Can't Complain	
2010	Congratulations	
2011	Fasel wa Na'ood	
2018	Son of Adam	
2022	The Spider	
2024	Aserb: The Squadron	

=== Television ===
Directed series
Year	Title	Ref.
2017	Kafr Delhab	
2021	Covid-25	
2023	War	
2024	Beit El Rifaey	
