= Congratulations (2010 film) =

- Directed by: Ahmed Nader Galal
- Written by: Khalid Diab; Mohamed Diab
- Produced by: Albatrous Film Production; Brothers United for Cinema
- Starring: Ahmed Helmy; Mahmoud Fishawi; Laila Ezz El-Arab; Sara Abdulrahman
- Music by: Amr Ismail
- Production company: Brothers United for Cinema
- Distributed by: Brothers United for Cinema
- Release date: July 15, 2009
- Country: Egypt
- Language: Arabic

Congratulations (Arabic: مبروك 1000, translit. 1000 Mabrook read as Alf Mabrook or a Thousand Congratulations) is a 2009 Egyptian film directed by Ahmed Nader Galal, played by Ahmed Helmy, a man who wakes up one morning to discover that the day repeats, a carbon copy of the day before, trapping him in an inescapable vicious circle. This man has dream to live for 100 years, however, he is living for one day only and that day keep repeating to show him the negative and positive things in his life.

== Plot ==
The film revolves around Ahmed Galal, an irresponsible, egotistical accountant working in a stock-trading company. At the beginning of the film, he is portrayed as a man who has no limits; a man who can fire employees just to maximize profits and who deals with his family with such carelessness that he is entirely out of touch with what is happening in their lives. The events of the film take place on Ahmed's wedding day, which goes horribly wrong. He wakes up to experience the usual domestic routine: His father shouting at him to get out of the bathroom, his mother complaining of the workload, and his customary bickering with his sister. In the street, he witnesses a burglary but doesn't bother to stop the thief. On his way back from work, he finds himself wrongly accused of a hit-and-run he didn't commit. The onlookers persuade him into taking the victim to the hospital. After going to the police station, he finds that his car has been seized by the authorities. The climax is when, crossing the street, a huge truck hits him and he dies.

Well, technically, he doesn't. He wakes up the next day, initially assuming that what has happened in the past 24 hours was a dream, before he experiences the same day all over again, meeting the same exact characters, having the same conversations and witnessing these unchanged incidents.

== Cast ==
- Ahmed Helmy as Ahmed Galal
- Mahmoud Fishawi as Ahmed's father
- Laila Ezz El-Arab as Ahmed's mother
- Sara Abdulrahman as Ahmed's sister
- Mohamed Farag as Karim
- Rahma Hassan as Sara

== See also ==
- List of films featuring time loops
