= Alzheimer's (film) =

- Film poster
- Arabic: زهايمر
- Directed by: Amr Arafa
- Written by: Nader Salah Eddine
- Starring: Adel Emam
- Music by: Omar Khairat
- Release date: 10 November 2010
- Country: Egypt
- Language: Arabic

Alzheimer's (Arabic: زهايمر) is a 2010 Egyptian comedy directed by Amr Arafa and film starring Adel Emam.

== Plot ==
Mahmoud (played by Emam) realizes one morning that he cannot recognize the people who work at his home, including his nurse Mona (Nelly Karim). However, he has actually been deceived by his children to believe that he has Alzheimer's disease, so they can get control of his wealth to pay off their own debts.

== Cast ==
- Adel Emam - Mahmoud Shuaib
- Nelly Karim - Mona
- Ahmed Rizk - Karim
- Saeed Saleh - Omar Kamal
