= A Difficult Mission =

- Directed by: Ehab Radi
- Written by: Hamdi Yousef
- Story by: Hisham Al-Qaysia
- Produced by: Al-Reef Artistic Production
- Starring: Tarek Allam; Ola Ghanem; Majdi Kamel; Khaled Elsawi; Donia; Marwa; Amro Mahdi
- Cinematography: Ahmed Hussien
- Edited by: Ehab Radi
- Music by: Essam Karika
- Distributed by: Oscar Al-Nasr Al-Masa
- Release date: 2006
- Running time: 100 minutes
- Country: Egypt
- Language: Arabic
- Box office: 2,343,331 L.E.

A Difficult Mission is a 2006 Egyptian film that raises the issue of trade of toxic pesticides, leading to cancerous vegetables. The film is directed by Ehab Radi and starring Majdi Kamel, Tarek Allam, Khaled Elsawi, and Ola Ghanem.

== Plot ==
Unlike expected themes of films in the contemporary Egyptian cinema, The Difficult Mission deals with a controversial community issue of pesticides and carcinogens which are a major cause for cancer cases in Egypt. The story was extracted from cases in the courts of Alexandria. The court dealt with the recent effects of the trade of those illegal chemicals and the effects on crops and on the people. Also, the film suggests other issues of corruption, such as the power of business elite and politicians to manipulate lives of innocent citizens by illegal trade, murder, and control.

The events of the film begin when Hind, a young woman, goes back home after work and three men attack her in an attempt to rape. Then Sami tries to save her and that lead to mistakenly kill of one of them. Sami is jailed, because he was accused of murder instead of self-defense. Those events branch out to expose mafia toxic drug trades. At jail, Sami meets Shawqi and forges a friendship that is carried after being imprisoned.

Embedded with scenes full of action, Shawqi and Sami are mistakenly involved, with one of the biggest business men in the country, in a case of illegal importers of fertilizers and toxins in the agriculture field. Sami refuses to agree to the crime of toxic fertilizers in the agriculture field and so he decides to use the help of the carcinogenic researcher. Dr. Nesma is the carcinogenic researcher, who refuses to sign an agreement that illegally imports toxic chemicals, therefore she is suspended from work; therefore, she decides to raise this controversial issue to higher authorities.

== Cast ==
- Majdi Kamel as main character, role of Shaqwi
- Tarek Allam as Sami accused of murder, for saving a victimized girl from rape
- Ola Ghanem as Doctor Nesma, a scientist working at the Center for Agricultural Research.
- Khaled Elsawi as Adham, head of the mafia.
- Donia as the victim of rape.
- Marwa as Shawqi's girlfriend
- Amro Mahdi as the Defense lawyer.

=== Special appearances ===
- Kareema Mokhtar as mother
- Saeed Saleh as unaccredited
- Ahmad Bedair as resigned scientist

== In film festivals ==
A Difficult Mission was chosen to participate in the Dubai International Film Festival in 2007. Khaled ElSawi and Tarek Allam stars of the film appeared at the DIFF in honor of the movie.

== More about Majdi Kamel ==
Majdi Kamel has other famous works with different stars from Egyptian cinema, such as About Love and Passion, co-starring Ahmed El Sakka, Mona Zaki, Menna Shalabi, Ghada Abdel Razek, and Khaled Saleh, directed by Tamer Habib. Also, he played an important role in the drama series, Nightingale, where he plays the role of President Gamal Abdel Nasser, and another series that represented the life of the great singer Abdel-Halim hafez.
