= Hala Khalil =

Egyptian film director, producer, and screenwriter

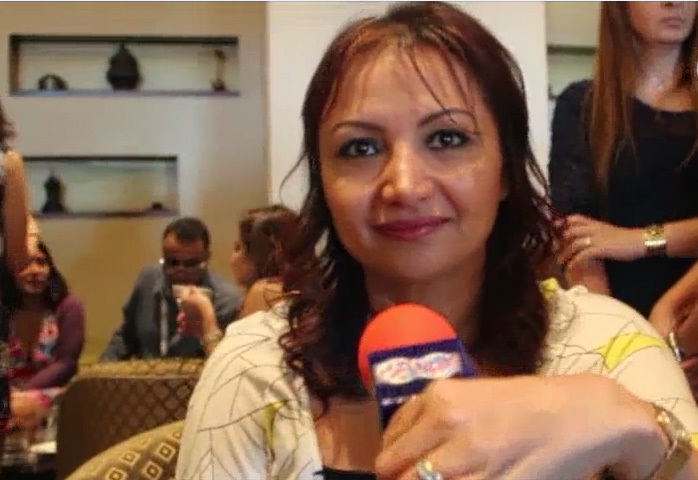
- Hala Khalil
- Born: July 23, 1967 (age 59); Cairo
- Citizenship: Egypt
- Education: Cairo Film School
- Occupations: film director, producer, and screenwriter

Hala Khalil (born July 23, 1967) is an Egyptian film director, producer, and screenwriter. Her work includes short films, documentaries, TV series, and feature films. Her films The Kite (1997) and The Best of Times (2004), have received awards from the Arab Film Festival, Rotterdam Arab Camera Festival, and the Rabat Film Festival.

Khalil belongs to the new generation of Egyptian female commercial and independent filmmakers that emerged in the first decade of the 21st century. The films of this period focus on the everyday lives of Egyptian women and their identity separation from men, functioning as an important part of feminism in Egypt.

== Early life ==
Khalil was born in Cairo, Egypt. After beginning her post-secondary education in engineering, she switched to the Cairo Film School, where she graduated in 1992 with a degree in filmmaking.

== Career ==
After graduating from the Cairo Film School, Khalil made her debut as a filmmaker and screenwriter with the short film, Puppets, in 1992. Her short film, The Kite (1997), was her first film to gain notable critical recognition. In 2004, she wrote and directed her first feature-length film, The Best of Times, for which she received awards at the Arab Camera Festival, in Rotterdam, Netherlands, the Rabat Film Festival, and recognition from the Egyptian Film Critics' Association.

Khalil also writes film reviews, and directs for the state television company. In addition to being a prominent Arab female short and feature filmmaker, Khalil is an executive producer has worked documentary films, and served on festival juries in Cairo, Ossian, Rotterdam, and Beirut.

== Filmography ==
Year	Film	Role	Notes
1992	Puppets (Marionettes)	Director/Writer	Short Film
1994	Silence of the Night (Hudu 'al-layl)	Director	Short Film
1997	The Kite (Tiri ya tayyara)	Director	Short Film
1998	Game's Revolution (Gamal al-thawra)	Director	Short Film
2000	Welcome with Ten Fingers (Ahbabak 'ashra)	Director	Short Film
2004	The Best of Times (Ahla al-awqat)	Director/Writer	Feature Film Second Prize at Rotterdam Arab Film Festival
2006	Cut and Paste	Director	Feature Film
2015	Nawara	Director/Writer/Producer	Feature Film

=== The Best of Times ===
In 2004, Khalil directed her first feature-length film, cowritten with Wassam Soliman. The Best of Times serves as an example of the themes of the new generation of female screenwriters and filmmakers in Egypt. The film follows Salma, a successful woman who is forced to move from her step-father's home following the death of her mother. The film takes place between the distinct neighbourhoods of Maadi and Shobra, as Salma embarks on an introspective journey to unearth who has been sending her anonymous letters. Khalil won second prize for The Best of Times at the Arab Camera Festival in Rotterdam.
