= Escaping Tel Aviv =

- Theatrical release poster
- Directed by: Sherif Arafa
- Written by: Amr Samir Atef
- Produced by: Hesham Abdel Khalek
- Starring: Karim Abdel Aziz; Mona Zaki; Sherif Mounir
- Cinematography: Ayman Abu El-Makarem
- Edited by: Dalia El-Nasser
- Music by: Omar Khairat
- Production company: Al-Nasr - Oscar - Al-Masah
- Distributed by: Diamond Art Production
- Release date: November 13, 2009
- Country: Egypt
- Languages: Egyptian Arabic, Hebrew

Welad El-Am (Arabic: ولاد العم; English: The Cousins), known internationally as Escaping Tel Aviv, is a 2009 Egyptian action film directed by Sherif Arafa and starring Karim Abdel Aziz, Mona Zaki and Sherif Mounir.

== Cast ==
- Karim Abdel Aziz (Mostafa)
- Mona Zaki (Salwa)
- Sherif Mounir (Ezzat Abdelhamid/Daniel Navon)
- Entessar (Rachel)
- Salim Kallas (Youshir, Director of Assassinations for Mossad)
- Sabry Abdel Monem (Bodour, Director of Egyptian Intelligence)
- Kinda Alloush (Darren)
- Iman (Sarah, Daniel’s mother)
- Yasser Ali Maher (GIS officer)
- Gerges Jabara (Abu Ziyad)
- Adham Morshed (Abed)

== Plot ==
Salwa (played by Mona Zaki) is an Egyptian woman who discovers that her husband (played by Sherif Mounir) is a Mossad agent and abducts her with her two young children to Israel. Mostafa (Karim Abdel Aziz), a GIS officer is assigned to rescue Salwa and her children and bring them back to Egypt.

== Production ==
Among many vicissitudes with the filming was an interruption of more than three months while the National Security Agency and other government entities reviewed the script, given the movie’s centering on the intelligence services and foreign relations with Israel and other nations.

Star Karim Abdel Aziz was injured filming an action scene when he fell two floors due to the snap of a guy wire. He was hospitalized and underwent surgery on his foot, followed by physical therapy in Germany, delaying the film’s completion by another two months.

Filming took eight weeks and was completed both outside Egypt (in Cape Town, South Africa and the Syrian Coastal Mountain Range, the latter with the blessing of the government of Syria) and domestically (in Port Said and at Cairo’s Studio Misr and Studio Ahmos.

== See also ==
- Cinema of Egypt
- List of Egyptian films of the 2000s
