= Suliman Eid =

Egyptian actor (1961–2025)

Soliman Eid
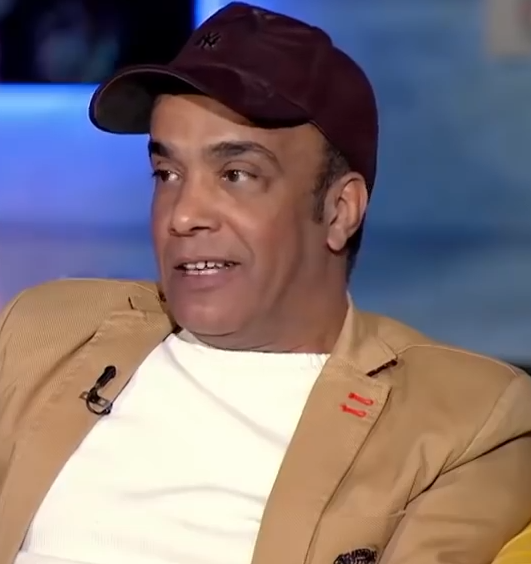
- Soliman Eid in a TV interview
- Born: 17 October 1961; Egypt
- Died: 18 April 2025 (aged 63); Cairo, Egypt
- Occupation: Actor
- Years active: 1982–2025
- Known for: Comic roles in Egyptian cinema and television
- Notable work: El Nazer (2000); Zaki Chan (2005); Africano (2001); Hammam in Amsterdam (1999); Terrorism and Kebab (1992); Birds of Darkness (1995); Valentino (2020); 365 Days of Happiness (2011); For Zeko (2022); Siko Siko (2025); Ana We Ibn Khalty (2024); Tani Tani (2024); El Beit Beity (2022); El Beit Beity 2 (2024)
- Children: 2

Soliman Eid (17 October 1961 – 18 April 2025) was an Egyptian actor of film, television and theater.

== Life and career ==
Eid graduated from the High Institute of Theatrical Arts acting department.

Soliman Eid began his artistic career in the late 1980s, starting out in theater and gaining recognition for his natural comedic timing and relatable performances. His breakthrough came with the 1992 film Terrorism and Kebab. Throughout his career, Eid appeared in more than 150 film, television, and theater productions. Among his notable works are Birds of Darkness, Sleep in Honey, and Hammam in Amsterdam. He became known for bringing both humor and depth to supporting roles, frequently standing out among ensemble casts.

His later appearances were in such TV series as Master of the People (Saeed El-Nass), The Station Cafe (Qahwet Al-Mahatta), Many Happy Returns (Obal Andoko), and Closed for Maintenance.

Eid died after "a sudden health crisis" on 18 April 2025, at the age of 63.
