= Mahmoud Kabil =

Egyptian actor and political activist

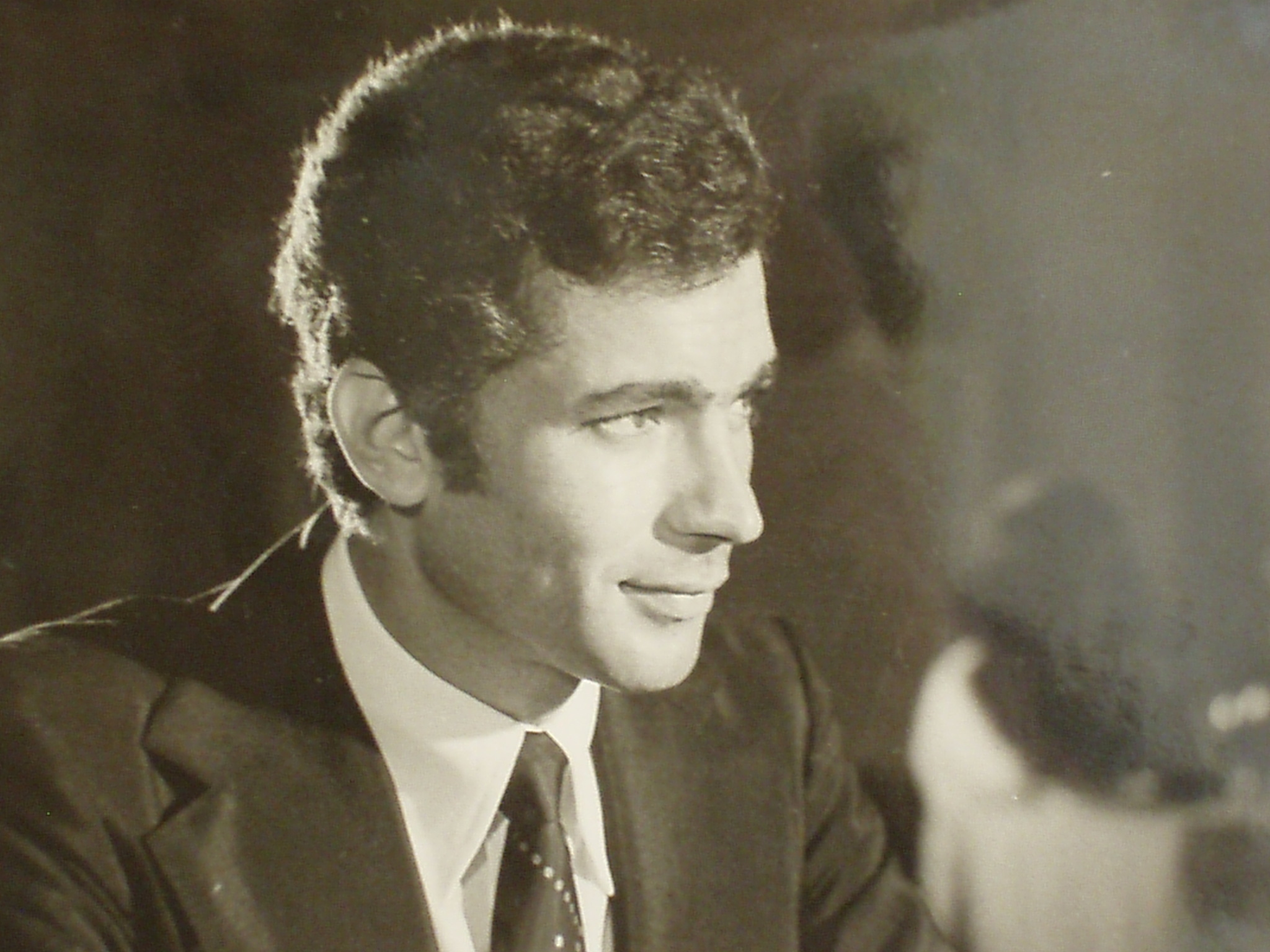
- Born: May 19, 1946 (age 80); Cairo, Egypt
- Occupations: Actor, UNICEF Goodwill Ambassador
- Years active: 1973–1979; 1993–present
- Spouse: Leila Moharram (divorced)

Mahmoud Kabil (Arabic: محمود قابيل, born May 19, 1946) is an Egyptian actor and political activist. He is also the UNICEF Goodwill Ambassador for the Middle East and North Africa. Kabil served as an officer in the Military of Egypt's Special Forces before becoming a promising actor in Egyptian cinema during the 1970s. Blacklisted in 1980, Kabil moved to the United States and took a 14-year hiatus from acting. He made a successful comeback upon his return to Egypt in 1993, and has since starred in more than 50 films and TV series on his way to becoming one of Egypt's most popular actors. After years of involvement with the United Nations, Kabil was named a UNICEF Goodwill Ambassador in November 2003.

== Life and career ==
Mahmoud Kabil was born in Cairo, Egypt. His father, Dr. Ibrahim Kabil, was head of the internal revenue service in Alexandria and the Western provinces as well as the Minister of Finance in the shadow government of the Saadi opposition party before the 1952 coup. At his death in 1959, Mahmoud was 12. Kabil was educated at the Lycee Francais of Alexandria before joining the Military of Egypt in 1964 at the age of 18. Serving until 1973 as an officer and captain in the Special Forces, Kabil participated in the Yemen War, the Six-Day War, and the War of Attrition.

Prior to his decision to enlist, Kabil was approached by director Youssef Chahine about starring in one of his films. Though Kabil declined the offer at the time, he would later renew ties with Chahine after his service in the military. Chahine, credited with launching the career of Omar Sharif, took Kabil under his wing and established him as a promising young actor in Egyptian cinema during the 1970s. Some of Kabil's more notable films during this period include Chahine's The Sparrow, Love Under the Rain (based on the Naguib Mahfouz novel), and The Damned (an adaptation of King Lear).

Kabil spent the last years of the 1970s attempting to have a short story he penned, Sinai 73, turned into a full-length film. Based on his experience of capturing Israeli pilot Yair Barak in the Six-Day War in 1967, the film was ideally to be a joint American-Israeli-Egyptian production that would highlight the possibility of peace between Egypt and Israel. By 1979, Dustin Hoffman had signed on to play the role of Kabil's prisoner for $3.5 million, but the project ultimately never advanced past the preliminary stages due to Sadat's assassination. United Studios of Israel approached Kabil to produce the film independent of Egyptian involvement, but he declined. After a visit to Israel in March 1980, Kabil was subsequently blacklisted by the League of Arab States and threatened by radical terrorist groups such as the Abu Nidal Organization. Unable to find work as an actor, Kabil left to the United States in 1981.

Kabil returned to Egypt in 1993 to attempt an acting comeback. He found initial success with audiences and critics alike with the films Penalty (1994) and Cheap Meat (1995). Since then, Kabil has starred in more than 50 films and TV series on his way to becoming one of Egypt's most popular actors. The bulk of his notoriety lies in television series, particularly those aired during the Ramadan season. He is most remembered for his roles in Ladies of Garden City (Hawânim Gârden Citî) (1998), Where is My Heart? (Ayna Qalbî) (2003), and Amar 14 (2008).

=== Involvement with UNICEF ===
After years of involvement with the United Nations, Kabil was named the UNICEF Goodwill Ambassador for the Middle East and North Africa in November 2003. He has spoken publicly about several important issues concerning children in the Middle Eastern region, including the plight of the children in Gaza, Darfur, and Yemen, Female Immunization, Female Genital Mutilation, HIV/AIDS, and the education of young girls. He has also been an outspoken critic of the Darfur genocide. Following a visit to the region, Kabil appealed to the Arab countries to play a more active role in offering support to UNICEF activities designed to help the women and children who have carried the brunt of the conflict.

In the aftermath of the Gaza Crisis, Kabil in February 2009 paid a visit to the El-Arish Hospital near the Gaza border crossing in Rafah. He met with injured Palestinian children and pledged UNICEF support to the development of an effective and speedy relief effort. He concluded 2009 with a trip to Yemen and a joint visit to Gaza with fellow UNICEF Ambassador Mia Farrow.

Kabil currently resides in San Antonio, Texas, USA.
