= The Belly Dancer and the Politician =

The Belly Dancer and The Politician
- الراقصة والسياسي
- Directed by: Samir Seif; Mohamed Yassin (assistant director)
- Written by: Ihsan Abdel Quddous
- Starring: Nabila Ebeid; Salah Kabil
- Music by: Muhammed Sultan
- Production companies: Screen 2000 Cinema and Video
- Release date: 1990
- Country: Egypt
- Language: Egyptian Arabic

The Belly Dancer and the Politician (Arabic: الراقصة والسياسي, translit. Al Raqisa wa Al Siyasy) is an Egyptian film released in 1990.

== Plot ==
Based on a novel by Ihsan Abdel Quddous, the film discusses the eternal conflict of power and authority, symbolized by the love affair between a politician and a belly dancer, revealing the corruption of a system where it becomes difficult to decide which has more integrity, the politician or the dancer.

== Cast ==
- Nabila Ebeid
- Salah Kabil
- Farouk Falawkas
- Ahmed Akl
- Fatima Fouad
- Nora Charles
- Suhair Tawfik
- Najwa Rabie
- Enas Shalaby
- Mervat el-Shennawy
- Hamdi Salam
- Saleh al-Aweel
