= Natacha Atlas, la rose pop du Caire =

- Directed by: Fleur Albert
- Screenplay by: Fleur Albert
- Produced by: La Huit Production, Télénantes, Festival des Escales de Saint Nazaire
- Starring: Natacha Atlas
- Cinematography: Nara Kéo Kosal
- Edited by: Stéphanie Langlois
- Music by: Natacha Atlas
- Release date: 2007
- Running time: 52 minutes
- Countries: Egypt; France

Natacha Atlas, la rose pop du Caire is a 2007 documentary film.

== Synopsis ==
Starting out at a concert at Saint Nazaire, passing through London and finally arriving in Cairo's uproar, the film depicts a series of fragmented musical sketches that, together, form the portrait of the singer from the sands, Natacha Atlas. From one migration to the next, one sole journey, one sole melancholic dream from East to West following in the footsteps of a rose of Pop...
