= In the Heliopolis Flat =

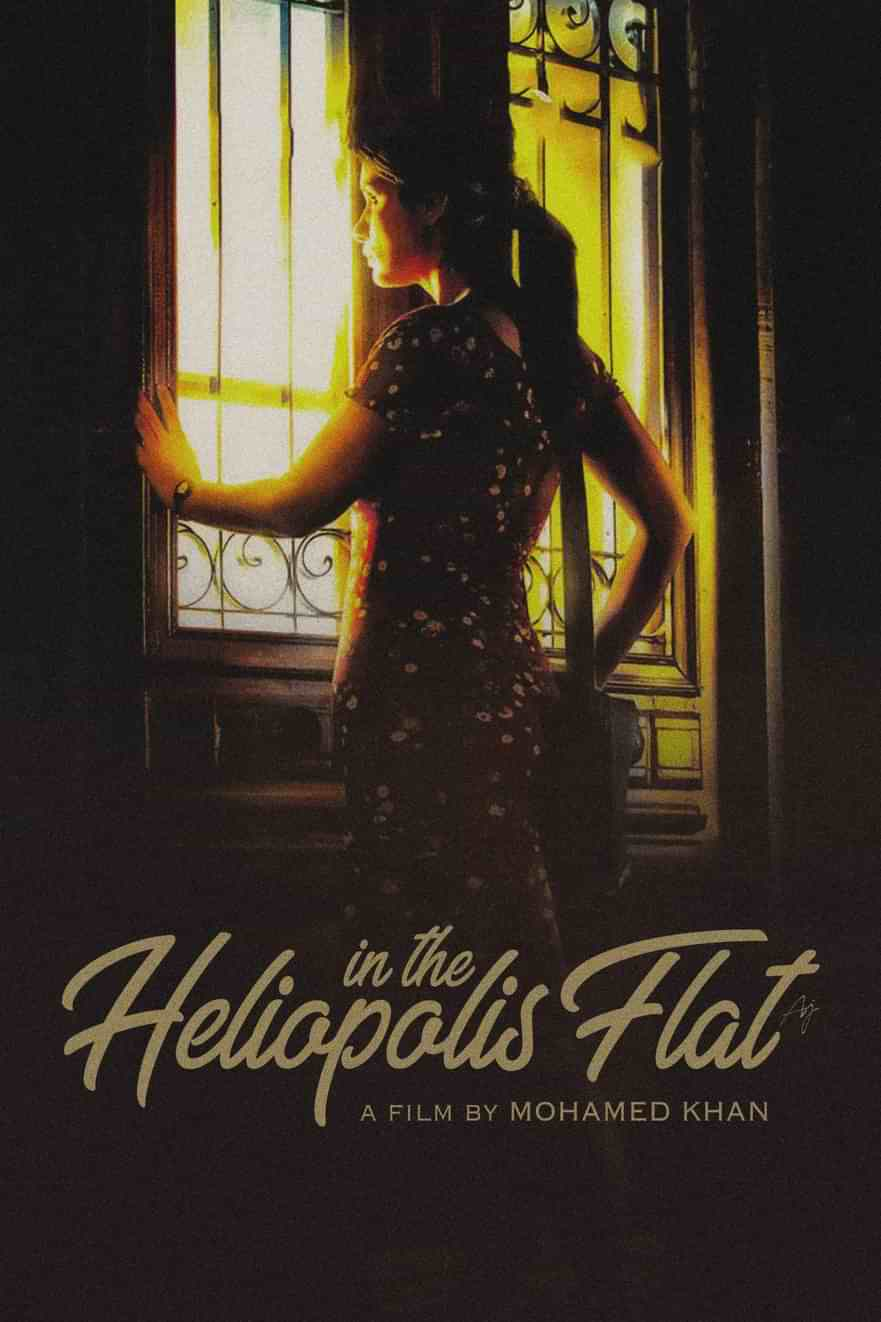
- Directed by: Mohamed Khan
- Written by: Wessam Soliman
- Produced by: Mamdouh El Leithy
- Cinematography: Nancy Abdel-Fattah
- Release date: 2007
- Country: Egypt
- Language: Arabic

In the Heliopolis Flat (Arabic: في شقة مصر الجديدة Fi Shaket Masr El Gedeeda) is a 2007 Egyptian film directed by Mohamed Khan. It was Egypt's official submission to the 80th Academy Awards for the Academy Award for Best Foreign Language Film, but it was not accepted as a nominee.

== Cast ==
- Ghada Adel as Nagwa
- Kal Naga as Yehya
- Aida Riyad as Hayat
- Ahmed Rateb as Eid
- Youssef Dawoud as Shafik
- Marwa Hussain as Dalia
- Daunia Massoud as Marwa

== See also ==
- List of submissions to the 80th Academy Awards for Best Foreign Language Film
