= Wingrave (film) =

- Directed by: Ahmed Khalifa
- Written by: Ahmed Khalifa
- Produced by: Ahmed Khalifa; Abdel Rahman Reda; Marwan Younis
- Starring: Ashraf Hamdi; Diana Brauch; Karim Higazy
- Music by: Ahmed Khalifa
- Distributed by: Tempe Entertainment
- Release date: 2007
- Running time: 91 minutes
- Country: Egypt
- Language: English
- Budget: $7,500 USD

Wingrave is an Egyptian horror film written and directed by Ahmed Khalifa and starring Ashraf Hamdi, Diana Brauch, and Karim Higazy. It was the first English-Language Egyptian feature film in history. The film was designed as a tribute to Gothic literature, Expressionist Cinema, and the ghost story genre.

== Plot ==
As renowned parapsychologist Henry Wingrave struggles conducting a forbidden seance, he recollects three of his most disturbing and challenging experiences with the restless dead. Throughout these experiences, he is asked to contact the dead brother of a grieving young woman, to cleanse a newly bought house of the malicious entities, and to determine whether a young woman is possessed by a demon, or simply insane.

== Production ==
The film was the shot in 9 days in Alexandria and Cairo with a budget of $7,500.

The film's crew consisted of Writer/Director Ahmed Khalifa, Production Manager Noha Said, and Assistant Director Mohamed Waheed.

The film was the first Egyptian film to be exclusively distributed in the U.S. on DVD and to be available for paid download and Video on Demand (VOD).
