= Rahma Hassan =

Egyptian actress and model

Rahma Hassan Haddad
- Born: December 15, 1988 (age 37); Cairo, Egypt
- Occupation: Actress
- Father: Hassan Haddad

Rahma Hassan (Arabic: رحمة حسن, born 15 December 1988) is an Egyptian actress and former model. She started her career as a model in music videos as well as some commercials. Her first role in 2009, followed by breakthrough role as a co-star in El Alamy with Youssef El Sherif. From there, she went on to star in Samir we Shahir we Bahir in 2010, then in multiple drama series like Azmet Sokkar (Sokkar's Crisis), Al Da'eya (The Preacher), and Moga Harra (Heat Wave) in 2013.

== Modelling and advertising ==
Hassan started her career as a model with Nadeem Nour in his video clips "El Leila Bs" and "Ya Allah Sho Moshta2lak" in 2008. Then, she started to act in a McDonald's advertisement ("Fastest Delivery - Kitchen") in 2009 and in the Mobinil advertisement ("A7san Nas - El Magmo3a "Mobinil").

== Acting ==
Hassan started her acting career in El Alamy, a film with Youssef El Sherif. After that, she starred in her first TV series Azmet Sokar with Ahmed Eid, where she played "Sherwet", a stubborn girl learning how to take decisions without being interested in any one and rejects the tutelage of her cousin, "Sokar" (played by Ahmed Eid) on her behavior after the death of her father, even to deceive, and discovered that in the end, must be in control of her actions.

Hassan considered the role of "Sherawet" a blunt message to every liberal girl, saying that she saw several models similar to Sherwet in her friends, and saw how the live stages of the storm. Because of travel and family, lack of command, and saw the disaster they have suffered because of the lack of family advice monitors. This all large and small for near and how the girl is a victim of people trying to exploit her presence alone without a guardian, the reins which govern her affairs.

She also said that she had suffered in the portrayal of Sherawet, made through the series "The crisis of sugar" because her character really strayed away from the personality of Sherwet the liberal, who refuses to accept advice and goes behind the decisions that were exposed to many problems and led in the end to disaster. Instead, in fact, she required most of the time in study and became absorbed in reading books in various fields.

After her success in the TV series Azmet Sokar, Hassan acted in the film Samir and Shahir and Bahir as Shahir's mother. The film was the highest-grossing in Egypt in 2010, which made Hassan a major film star in the country.

== Filmography ==
Year	Title	Role
2010	Azmet Sokar	Sherwet
2012	Zay el Ward	Sarah
2013	El da3eya	Marwa
2013	Moga Harra	
2015	Wesh tany	
2017	Sabe3 gar	Halla
