= Sherif Mounir =

Egyptian actor

Sherif Mounir شريف منير
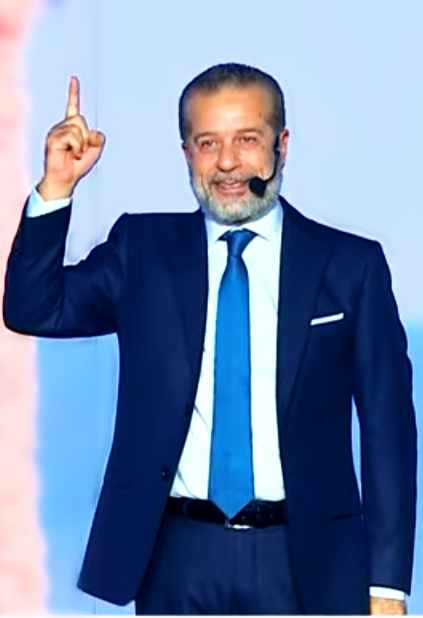
- Born: Sherif Ahmed Mounir; May 14, 1959 (age 67); El Mansoura, Dakahlia, Egypt
- Other name: El Zaeem
- Occupation: Actor
- Years active: 1983–present
- Children: Asmaa, Fouad, Fareeda and Camila

Sherif Mounir (Arabic: شريف منير) is an Egyptian actor.

== Career ==
Sherif Ahmed Mounir is an Egyptian actor who was born on 14 May 1959 in Mansoura, Dakahlia Governorate. On the advice of poet Salah Jahin, he joined the acting department at the Higher Institute of Theatrical Arts. He began his career during the mid-1980s, appearing in television productions such as “Rihla El Milion” (Journey of a Million), “Bakeeza We Zaghloul,” and “Leyyali El Haleema” (Nights of El Helmeya), alongside films including “El Tawfaan” (The Flood), “Darbet Maalim” (Master Stroke), and “Abnaa’ Wa Kutla” (Children and Murderers). His major breakthrough came in the 1990s when he portrayed Youssef in “El Kit Kat.” He subsequently built an extensive film career, appearing in “Diso Disco,” “Romantica,” “Short Wa Fanila Wa Kab” (Shorts, Tanktop, and Hat), “Sihr El Layyali” (Sleepless Nights), “Welad El ‘Am,” “Al-Safa,” and “Hysteria.

Mounir has also appeared in numerous television series, including “Agaza Maftouha” (“Unpaid Leave”) in 2021. His theatre credits include “Hazemny Ya,” “Keda Ok,” and “Alabanda.” In 2022, he was selected for an honorary tribute at the 27th International Festival of Mediterranean Cinema of Tetouan, held from 10 to 17 June in Tetouan, Morocco.

In 2023, Mounir was among the prominent honorees at the Niche Awards, alongside Maged El Masry and Ahmed Fahim.

== Works ==
=== Selected filmography ===
Year	Film/TV Series	Role
2024	Aserb: The Squadron	Sherif El-Masry
2023	Day 13	Dr. Qaysoon El-Nasser
2016	30 Years Ago	Omar
2012	Helm Aziz	Aziz's Father
2009	Welad El Am	Ezzat / Daniel
2008	El-shayatin: El-Awdah	Ahmed
2008	Masgoon Transit	Cameo Appearance
2007	Al-Shayatin	Ahmed
2007	Cut and Paste	Youssef
2007	Ouija	Adham
2004	Aris min geha amneya	Tarek
2003	Kedah okaih	Azab
2003	Sleepless Nights	Sameh
2002	El labess	
2000	Short w Fanelah w Cap	Menem
1996	Hysteria	
1996	Romantica	Hassan
1993	Ghadeboon Wa Ghadebat (TV Series)	
1993	El Mal We El Banon (TV Series)	Farid
1991	Al-Kit Kat	Youssef
1986	Bakiza Wa Zaghloul (TV Series)	Saeed
1986	Awdat mowatin	
