= Yasmin Abdulaziz =

Egyptian artist (born 1980)

- Born: 16 January 1980 (age 46); Cairo, Egypt
- Occupation: Artist
- Years active: 1998–present
- Spouse: Mohamed Nabil Halawa (m. 2001; div. 2018) Ahmed El-Awady (m. 2020; div. 2024)
- Children: 2

Yasmin Abdulaziz (Arabic: ياسمين عبد العزيز, Yāsmīn ʿAbd el-ʿazīz; born 16 January 1980) is an Egyptian artist. She is among the best female actors in Egypt.

== Biography ==
Abdulaziz started in commercials at the age of 12 because of one of her mother's friends who owns a company of commercials. After a while she started to act in cinema and television with a series named A Woman From The Love Time that was a huge success all around the Middle East. After this success she made another mini-series called Kids Are Going Crazy.

Abdulaziz focused in the last period on showing in cinema movies more than television movies while the other actresses of her generations were not, and she made her second big success by appearing with the comedian Ahmed Helmi in a romantic comedy named Zaki-Chan, which made very big gains in the box-office in its first week. In 2001, she made a movie with Ashraf Abdel Baqi called Rasha Gareea and another in 2005 with Mostafa Qamar named Hareem Karim, which talks about a broken hearted woman who thought that her husband cheated on her when he did not so he tries to tell her the truth by calling his college. She also starred in dramatic movies like Farhan Molazem Adam and Qalb Gariee.

She has also taken part in many drama series including “Al Raqs 3ala Salalom Motaharka,” “Herbana Minha,” “Li Akhir Nafas,” “Why Fall In Love Again,” and “Ele Maloosh Kbeer.” She has also taken on roles in several films such as “Dare To Give,” “Say'e Bahr,” “Haha W Tofaha,” “Tomn Dastet Ashrar,” “The Hostage,” “Karkar,” “Esabet Dr. Omar,” “Eldada Dodi,” “Al Thalatha Yashtaghaloonaha,” and others.

Yasmin Abdel Aziz was among the actresses honored at the ninth edition of the Energy Drama Cup awards in Cairo for her performance during the 2025 Ramadan season. She received recognition for her leading role in Watqabel Habeeb, which was well received by audiences. Other members of the series’ team were also honored, including poet Mona Al-Qai’i, screenwriter Amr Mahmoud Yassin and director Mohamed Al-Khubairi. Abdel Aziz thanked the cast and crew for their work in making the series successful. The ceremony brought together numerous actors and television professionals, with more than 4 million votes reportedly cast by audiences for their favorite productions. The Energy Drama Cup is an annual event celebrating Egyptian and Arab television drama.

== Personal life ==
The actress married Egyptian businessman Mohamed Nabil Halawa in 2001, with whom she has two children, Yasmin and Seif-eldin, but the couple divorced in 2018. In 2020, the actress struck the media with the news of her relationship with Egyptian former Handball player and Actor Ahmed El-Awady, whom she married in December 2019 and on Tuesday January 16 of 2024 she announced her divorce via an Instagram post stating "The official divorce between me and Ahmed took place, and we have the utmost respect and appreciation." She resembles Amy Samir Ghanem.

== Filmography ==
=== Film ===
- Gala Gala (2001)
- Rashshah Gari'ah (2001)
- Alb Gari' (2002)
- Saye' Bahr (2004)
- Farhan Molazem Adem (2005)
- Harim Karim (2005)
- Zaki Chan (2005)
- 1/8 Dastet Ashrar (2006)
- El Rahinah (2006)
- Haha w Toffahah (2006)
- Esabet el Doctor Omar (2007)
- Karkar (2007)
- El Dada Dudi (2008)
- Ethalathah Yashtaghelonaha (2010)
- El Anesah Mami (2012)
- Gawaza Miri (2014)
- Abu Shanab (2016)
- El Abla Tamtam (2018)
- Take Care of Yourself (2026)

=== Theatre ===
- Kedah Okeh (2003)

=== Television ===
- harbanah menha (2017)
- L Akher Nafas (2019)
- W Nheb Tani Leh (2020)
- Elli Malosh Kebir (2021)
- Dharb Nar (2023)
- Emraa men zaman lhob (1998)
