= May Kassab =

Maii Kassab
- Born: December 8, 1981 (age 44); Tanta, Egypt
- Origin: Egypt
- Genres: Arabic, Music of Egypt
- Occupations: Singer and actress
- Years active: 2000–present
- Labels: Rotana Records

May Kassab (Arabic: مي كساب) (born December 8, 1981) is a popular female singer and actress from Egypt. She has signed with Rotana, the biggest Record company in the Middle East.

== Discography ==
- Haga Teksef
- Ahla Min al Kalam
- Ana Less Hena
