= Kosai Khauli =

Syrian actor

Kosai Khouli
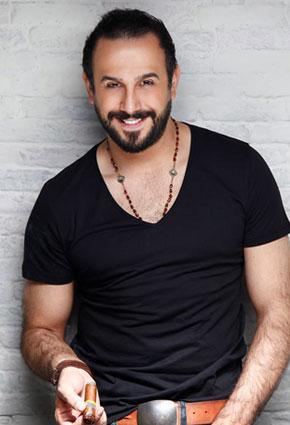
- Born: Kosai Khouli; 1 April 1976 (age 50); Damascus, Syria
- Education: University of Damascus
- Occupation: Actor
- Years active: 1998–present
- Awards: Best Arabic Actor (2006 - 2011); Adonia (2005); Most voted for Arabic Actor (2010)

Kosai Khauli (Arabic: قصي خولي; born 1 April 1976 in Damascus, Syria) is a Syrian actor. He portrayed the king of Egypt Ismai’il Pasha in the 2014 historic TV drama Saraya Abdeen that aired on MBC in 2014.

== Life ==
He mentioned in an interview on MBC that there is a common misinformation about his birthplace, and that he was born and raised in Damascus and just spending his summers in Tartus.

Kosai was born in Syria to a Maronite Christian family. He studied Law for two years but later decided to pursue acting studies at the Higher Institute of Dramatic Arts from which he graduated in 1999. His debut role was a leading role in the television film (Difficult Memory) in 1998.

In 2018, he became a father to his first son Fares from his Tunisian partner, Madiha Elhemdani.

== Filmography ==
=== Cinema ===
- Seven Minutes to Midnight
- Slap
- Dreamy Vision
- Lovers
- Forgiving
- Mariam Baker
- New Year
- Sweat Lies
- Scenarios
- Aserb: The Squadron (2024)

=== Television ===
- Difficult Memory (Thakira Saaba) 1998 – ذاكرة صعبة
- My Family and I (Ailaty Wa Ana) 1999 – عائلتي و أنا
- Young Women (Nisaa Saghirat) 1999 – نساء صغيرات
- Mirrors (Maraya) 2000 – مرايا
- Dreams Won't Die (Ahlam La Tamout) 2001 – أحلام لا تموت
- Sons of oppression (Abnaa' al Qahr) 2002 – أبناء القهر
- Four Seasons (Al Fosoul Al Arbaa) 2002 – الفصول الأربعة
- Migrate Souls (Arwah Mouhajira) 2002 – أرواح مهاجرة
- Bread and Salt (Khobz Wa Milh) 2003 – خبز و ملح
- Kolat zog wa kitret ghalabe – قلة زوق و كترة غلبة
- Orientals (Sharqiyat) 2003 – شرقيات
- Law, But (Qanun Wa Lakin) 2003 – قانون و لكن
- Big Dreams (Ahlam Kabira) 2003 – أحلام كبيرة
- Era of Madness (Asr Al Junoon) 2004 – عصر الجنون
- Behind Bars (Khalf Al Kudhban) 2005 – خلف القضبان
- Soft Thorns (Ashwak Naiima) 2005 – أشواك ناعمة
- Concealed Hatred (Ahqad Khafia) 2005 – أحقاد خفية
- Folks of Love (Ahl Al Ghrama) 2006 – 2008 (Seasons 1 & 2) – أهل الغرام
- Gazelles in a forest of wolves (ghizlan fi ghabat al thiab) 2006 – غزلان في غابة الذئاب
- Messages of Love and War (Rasael Al Hob Wal Harb) 2007 – رسائل الحب و الحرب
- Sour Grapes of Sham (Al Hosrom Al Shami) 2007 -2009 (Seasons 1,2 & 3) – الحصرم الشامي
- A stigma of shame (Wasmet Aar) 2007 – وصمة عار
- Partners share the ruins (Shurakaa yataqasamoon al kharab) 2008 – شركاء يتقاسمون الخراب
- Spot light (Buqaat Daw) 2008 (Season 6) – بقعة ضوء
- Another Rainy Day (Youm Momter Akhar) 2008 – يوم ممطر أخر
- Ahl Al Rayeh (Folks of the Flag) 2009 – 2010 (Seasons 1 & 2) – أهل الراية
- Cup of Blood (Finjan Al Dam) 2010 – فنجان الدم
- The Neighborhood Gate (Bab Al Hara) 2010 (Season 5) – باب الحارة
- Doors to the Clouds (Abwab Al Ghaim) 2010 – أبواب الغيم
- Eastern Bed (Takht Sharqi) 2010 – تخت شرقي
- Born from the Flank (Al Wilada Min Al Khasira) 2011 -2013 (Season 1, 2 & 3) – الولادة من الخاصرة
- Men of Honor (Rigal Al Izz) 2011 – رجال العز
- The Prohibited Love (Al Ishq Al Haram) 2011 – العشق الحرام
- Salty Life (Haya Maliha) 2012 – حياة مالحة
- Naked Souls (Arwah Ariya) 2012 – أرواح عارية
- We will be back shortly (Sanaoud Baada Kalil) 2013 – سنعود بعد قليل
- Saraya Abdeen (Seasons 1,2) – سرايا عابدين
- Bint El Shahbandar- 2015 بنت الشهبندر
- Teen Wolf (Seasons 5,6) - 2015
- A crime of passion (jarimat shaghaf) - 2016 جريمة شغف
- Harun Al Rasheed- 2018 هارون الرشيد
- 5:30 five thirty (khamsa w nos) - 2019 خمسة ونص
- Doubt - 2020 الشك
- 2020 twenty twenty (eshreen eshreen)-2020 عشرين عشرين
- not guilty (la hukm alayh)-2021 لاحكم عليه
- paranoya-2021 بارانويا
- Al Wasem- 2022 - الوسم
- Men Wa Ela- 2022 - من و إلى
- Wa Akheeran- 2023 - وأخيرا
- Man sa yarbah al malyoon (Who Wants to Be a Millionaire?) - 2024 - من سيربح المليون

== Awards ==
- Adonia Festival* – Best Actor Award, 2006
- People Choice Awards * – Actor of Generation Award, TOP 5 Best Male Actors, 2006
- Cairo Arab Media Festival * – Best Supporting Actor Award, 2007
- Murex D’or Award* – Arabic Star of the Year, 2010
- Murex D’or Award* – Best Actor and Audience Award, 2011
