= Mona Zaki =

Egyptian actress (born 1977)

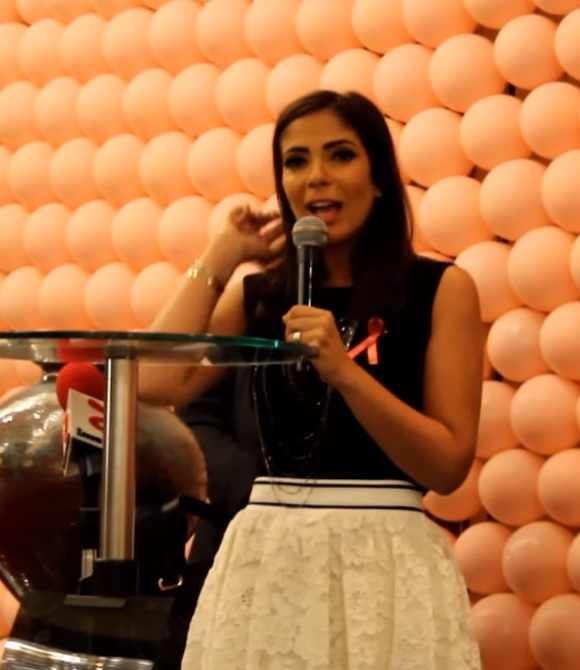
- Zaki in 2015
- Born: Mona Ali Mohamed Zaki; 18 November 1977 (age 48); Cairo, Egypt
- Citizenship: Egypt
- Education: Cairo University
- Occupation: Actress
- Years active: 1991–present
- Spouse: Ahmed Helmy (m. 2002)
- Children: 3

Mona Ali Mohamed Zaki (Arabic: منى علي محمد زكي; born 18 November 1977) is an Egyptian actress.

== Early life and education ==
Mona Ali Mohamed Zaki was born in Cairo to her parents Ali Mohamed and Tahini Zaki on 18 November 1977. Her father was a university professor who held a number of international posts. After living in the United States, the UK and then Kuwait, Zaki returned to Cairo when she was thirteen. Since her Kuwaiti diploma was not accredited in Egypt and not accepted by any school, Zaki had some free time and auditioned on a whim for Bil 'Arabi Al-Fasih (In Formal Arabic), a play directed by Mohamed Sobhi. She got the role and put her schooling on hold until the end of the play's year-and-half run, at which point Zaki returned to the United States to enroll in a two-year program at the Heritage Academy in Louisiana. Upon returning to Cairo in 1993 she briefly attended the Institute of Dramatic Arts before enrolling at the Faculty of Mass Communication, Cairo University.

== Career ==
=== 1990s ===
In 1989, when she was 13, Zaki landed her first acting role in Mohamed Sobhi's play Bel Araby El Faseeh (In Formal Arabic) after answering a casting call. The production ran for a year-a-half. Her next role came in 1994 while a student at Cairo University, in her TV debut in El A'elah, (The Family), a Ramadan television series. She appeared in a succession of popular TV series in the '90s including Al Helmeya Nights in 1995; Zizinia (1997–2000); Ahalina (Our Kin) in 1997 and El Daw' El Sharid (The Stray Light) in 1998.

Her first film role was in the 1998 crime drama El Katl ElLaziz (Sweet Killing), starring Mervat Amin, one of Egypt's most popular actresses at the time. Other films followed including Idhak El Soura Titla' Hilwa (Smile, the Photo Comes about Better) (1998); Sa'idi fil Gam'a Al-Amrikiya (Upper Egyptian in the American University) (1998); Omar 2000, El Hobb El Awal (The First Love), and Leih Khallitni Ahibbak (Why Did You Let Me Love You?), all of which were box office hits.

During this period, Zaki continued to take to the stage in several plays, including Le'b Eyal (Child's Play), Ya Messafer Wahdak, (Lone Traveler), and Afrouto.

=== The 2000s ===
The year 2000 was prolific for Zaki who starred in four movies including Mustafa Qamar in El Hobb El Awwal (First Love); Omar, opposite Khaled El Nabawy and her husband, Ahmed Helmy—the first of several films they would subsequently film together; Leh Khalletni Ahebbak (Why Did You Make Me Love You Too) again alongside Helmy and Karim Abdel Aziz.

In 2001 Zaki took on the role of Jehan Sadat in the biopic The Days of Sadat about Egyptian president Anwar Sadat, among that year's highest grossing films in Egypt. She was awarded the Egyptian Order of Cultural Merit for her portrayal. That same year she starred in the comedy Africano which was a box office success, grossing 8 million EGP and her second in a series of collaborations with co-star Ahmad Al-Sakka. They starred again in the action film Mafia (2002) which was another commercial hit bringing in about 13 million EGP at the box office In 2003 Zaki appeared in Hani Khalifa's feature debut Sleepless Nights (2003), a commercial and critical success, that pushed Egyptian social boundaries in addressing sex and marital issues. It has since become a cult classic in contemporary Egyptian cinema. Khalifa and Zaki would again collaborate in the 2024 box office hit Flight 404.

In 2007 she starred in Taymour and Shafika, once again opposite Al-Sakka, playing childhood sweethearts whose love is put to test when her character is appointed a minister and he is charged as her bodyguard. While a romantic comedy, the film aimed to show the serious challenges faced by modern-Egyptian women in balancing career ambitions with love and marriage.

=== The 2010s ===
In 2016, starred in the Ramadan TV series Afrah El-Qoba (The Ooba Weddings) adapted from a novel by Naguib Mahfouz which garnered Zaki the Best Actress Murex D'Or.

In 2019, Zaki became the first female Egyptian actor to be honored with her own star at the Dubai Stars Walk of Fame in Dubai.

=== The 2020s ===
In April 2021, Zaki appeared in the mega hit Ramadan drama series Newton's Cradle playing a pregnant woman whose plans go awry when she travels to the United States to have her child born on American soil. Egypt's most watched television series of the year, it became a global hit after it was picked up by Netflix and released in January 2022.

In 2022, Zaki appeared in Netflix's first ever Arabic language film Perfect Strangers, a huge hit in North Africa and Middle East. A remake of the 2016 Italian film, the film proved controversial with many Egyptians in light of its depictions of sexuality, including homosexuality, and cursing. Particularly strong criticism was directed at Zaki, the sole Egyptian cast member and with the long-held image of "the girl next door."

In February 2023, Zaki appeared in the Ramadan series Taht El Wesaya (Under Guardianship), in the role of a widow with two children whose struggles after her husband’s death are amplified by the Egyptian Guardianship Law that privileges the parental grandfather or guardian rights over those of the mother. The popular series prompted calls for reforming Egyptian family law.

In January 2024 Flight 404 was released in Egyptian theaters with Zaki in the starring role. The film was a regional box office hit and broke Egyptian box office records for a female-led film. In October of that year the film was selected as the Egyptian submission for the Best International Feature Film at the 97th Academy Awards.

Also in 2024, Zaki appeared in Aserb: The Squadron, an Egyptian action film based on the actual events of the massacre of 21 Egyptian Copts in Libya and the ensuing Egyptian military operations against the responsible terrorists.

In December 2025, El Sett (The Lady), a biopic of the iconic Egyptian singer Umm Kulthum with Zaki in the title role, had its world premier at the Marrakech International Film Festival. Directed by Marwan Hamed with a screenplay by Ahmed Mourad, the film was released in Egyptian cinemas on December 10th. Zaki described the role as the most challenging of her career. Made for an estimated 8 million dollars, it reportedly grossed less than 2 million dollars and was considered a commercial and critical flop.

==== Production company ====
In January 2024 Zaki co-founded the production company, Her Story, with publishing entrepreneur May Abdel-Azim. The incubator program is aimed at supporting female Egyptian and Arab filmmakers. Its inaugural program funded 20 short films, and in late 2024, they established a sister chapter in Bahrain with the support of the Bahrain Ministry of Information and the Bahrain Film Festival. In March of 2025 Her Story's Egypt chapter opened applications for its second edition.

== Personal life ==
Mona is married to Egyptian actor Ahmed Helmy. They have three children: Lilly (born 2003), Selim (born 2014), and Younis (born 2016).

== Philanthropy ==
Zaki has been a UNICEF Goodwill Ambassador since 2009 and in that capacity has appealed for donations surrounding regional events impacting children such as the 2020 Beirut explosion and the Gaza war. In 2010 she was a spokesperson for the Egyptian Springs of Life blood donation campaign conducted in cooperation with the World Health Organization.

== Filmography ==
=== Film ===
Year	Title	Original Title	Role	Notes	Ref(s)
1997	The Delicious Killing	El Atl el Laziz	Sherin		
1998	Upper Egyptian in the American University	Se'idi fi el Gam'a el Amrikiyya	Syadah		
1998	Laugh, Picture Be Sweet	Edhak El Sura Tetla Helwa	Tahani		
2000	The First Love	El Hobb El Awwal	Ranya		
2000	Horseback Knight	Fares Zahr el Khel	Zin		
2000	Why You Let Me Love You	Leh Khalletni Ahebbak	Dalya		
2000	Omar 2000	Omar 2000	Bibo		
2001	The Days of Sadat	Ayyam Elsadat	Jehan Sadat		
2001	Africano	Africano	Gamilah		
2002	Mafia	Mafia	Maryam		
2003	From Look Of Eye	Men Nazret En	Sarah		
2003	Sleepless Nights	Sahar el Layali	Berihan		
2004	My Aunt France	Khalti Faransa	Battah		
2005	Abu Ali	Abu Ali	Salma		
2005	Dreams Of Our Life	Ahlam Omrena	Nada		
2006	Blood Of Gazelle	Dam el Ghazal	Hanan		
2006	About Longing and Love	'An el sho' w el Hawa	Alya		
2006	Halim	Halim	Nawal		
2007	Taymur and Shafi'ah	Taymur w Shafi'ah	Shafi'ah		
2009	Scheherazade, Tell Me a Story	Ehki Ya Shahrzad	Hebah		
2009	Escaping Tel Aviv	Welad El Am	Salwa		
2011	18 Days	18 Yom	Mona		
2016	30 Years Ago	Men 30 Sanah	Hanan		
2020	Black Box	El Sandu' el Eswed	Yasmin		
2022	Perfect Strangers	Ashab, Wala Aaz	Mariam	Netflix film	
2022	The Spider	El Ankabout	Laila		
2024	Flight 404	Rehla 404	Ghada		
2024	Aserb: The Squadron				
2025	El Sett		Umm Kulthum	Biopic	

=== Series ===
Year	Title	Original Title	Role	Platform/Network	Ref(s)
1994	The Family	El 'Elah	Awatef		
1995	Nights of the Helmiyyah 5	Layali el Helmiyyah 5	Sonia		
1997–2000	Zizinia	Zizinia			
1997	Our Kins	Ahalina			
1998	The Stray Light	El Du el Shared			
2002–2003	Egyptian Goha	Goha el Masri			
2006	Cindrella	Cindrella			
2007	Critical Moments	Lahazat Haregah			
2013	Asia	Asia	Asia		
2014	Equal 100 Man	Be 100 Ragel			
2016	Saturday Night Live	Letet el Sabt mobasher	Guest		
2016	Wedding of El'obbah	Afrah El'bbah	Tahiat Abdeh		
2021	Newton’s Game	Le’bet Newton			
2023	Under Guardianship		Hanan		

=== Theatre ===
Title	Original title
By Fluent Arabic	B el 'Arabi el Fasih
O Traveling Alone	Ya Msafer Wahdak
So Ok	Kedah OK
Demon	Afrotto

== Awards and distinctions ==
- 2017: Murex D’Or Best Actress (for the 2016 TV series Afrah El Qoba)
- 2020: Faten Hamama Award of Excellence, Cairo International Film Festival
- 2023: Best Actress Award (for Tahet El Wesaya series), Cairo Drama Festival
