= Samir Seif =

Egyptian film director (1947–2019)

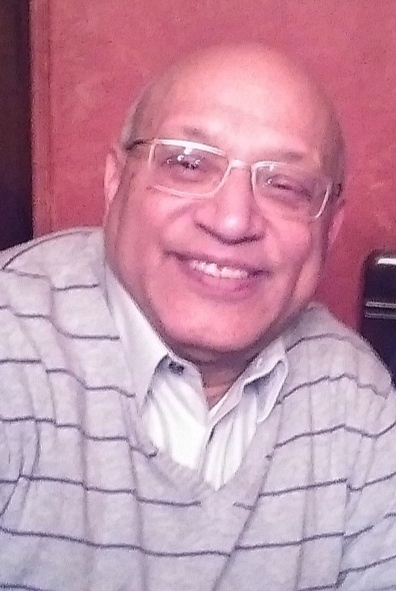
- Born: October 23, 1947; Cairo, Egypt
- Died: December 9, 2019 (aged 72); Cairo, Egypt
- Education: Higher Institute of Cinema
- Occupations: Director, screenwriter

Samir Seif (October 23, 1947 – December 9, 2019) was an Egyptian director and writer.

He graduated from the Higher Institute of Cinema.

He died in 2019 from cardiac arrest.

== Filmography ==
=== Film ===
Year	Title	Director	Writer	Notes	Ref.
1981	The Suspect	Yes	No		
1983	The Ghoul	Yes	No		
1984	Beware of Alkhot	Yes	No		
1984	Al Halfout	Yes	No		
1987	The Tiger and the Woman	Yes	No		
1989	The Festival	Yes	No		
1990	The Belly Dancer and the Politician	Yes	No		
1997	The Mushroom	Yes	Yes		
2003	His Excellency the Minister	Yes	No		
2019	Augustine: Son of Her Tears	Yes	No		
