= Yousra =

Egyptian actress and singer (born 1955)

- يسرا
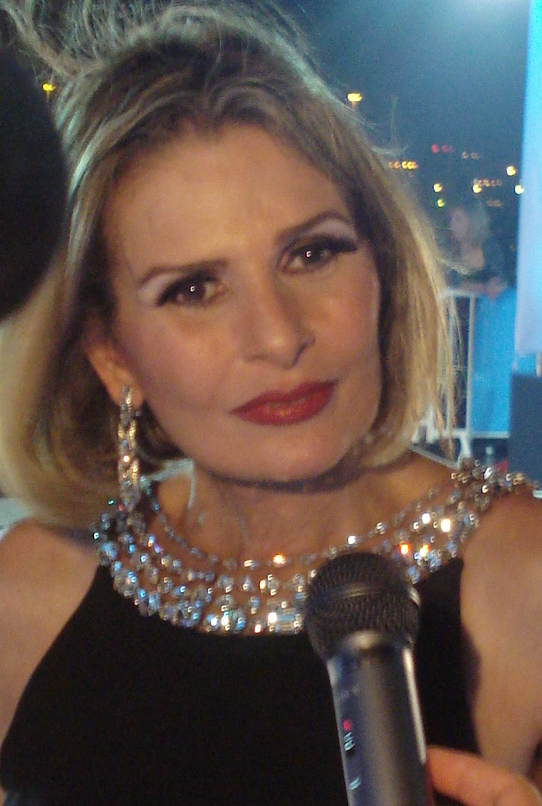
- Yousra in 2009
- Born: Sivin Hafez Nessim; March 10, 1955 (age 71); Cairo, Egypt
- Occupation: Actress
- Years active: 1977–present
- Spouse: Khaled Selim

Sivin Hafez Nesim (Arabic: سيفين حافظ نسيم, pronounced [siˈveːn neˈsiːm]; born March 10, 1955), known professionally as Yousra (/ˈjɔːsrə/ YAWSS-rə; Arabic: يسرا, pronounced [ˈjosɾɑ]), is an Egyptian actress. She is regarded as a prominent figure in the Middle East entertainment industry and has been described as an influential cultural icon in the region.

== Career ==
Yousra has appeared in nearly 81 films, about 20 television dramas, and three stage productions. She made her film debut in 1980 with Athkiya' Laken Aghbiya (Smart Yet Stupid). Over the years, she has taken on a wide range of roles, including comedic, dramatic, and romantic characters. Her early work included Kasr Fi El Hawaa (Castle in the Air) by Abdel Halim Nasr (1980), Fatah Tabhath Ann Alhob (A Girl Looking for Love) by Nader Galal (1977), Alf Bossa Wa Bossa (A Thousand and One Kisses) by Mohamed Abdel Aziz (1977), and Ebtessama Waheda Takfi (One Smile Is Enough) by Mohamed Bassiyouni (1978).

She later starred in a series of successful films with Adel Emam, including Shabab Yarkoss Fawk Alnar (Youth Dancing on Fire) by Yehiya Al Alamy (1978), Al Ensan Yaeesh Mara Waheda (Man Only Lives Once) by Simone Saleh (1981), Ala Bab Al Wazeer (At the Door of the Minister) by Mohamed Abdel Aziz (1982), Al Avocato (The Lawyer) by Raafat Al Mihi (1984), Al Ins Wa Algen by Mohamed Radi (1985), and Karakoun Fi El Shareih. Their collaborations were known for combining humour with social and political commentary. The duo also appeared together in Al Mansi (The Forgotten), Al Irhab Wal Kabab (Terrorism and Kebab), and Toyour Al Zalam (Birds of Darkness), all of which used comedy to explore political themes and received both critical and popular acclaim.

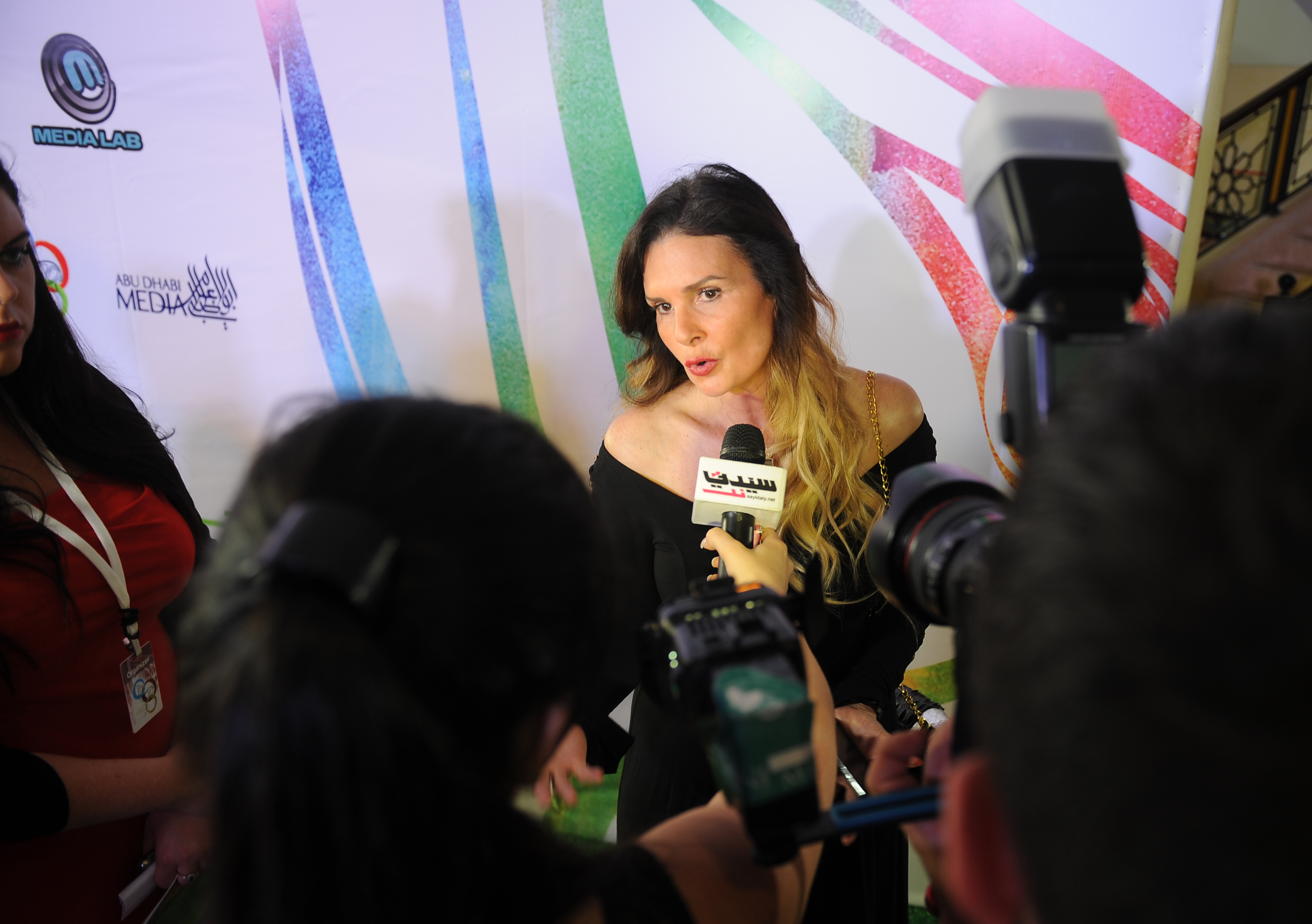
Yousra in 2013

A significant milestone in Yousra's career was her collaboration with Egyptian director Youssef Chahine. She appeared in his films Hadduta Masreya (Egyptian Story, 1982), Iskanderiya Kaman we Kaman (Alexandria Again and Again, 1990), and Al Mohager (The Emigrant, 1994). Yousra has stated that Chahine had a profound influence on her personally and professionally, describing him as "a school for anyone who works with him."

Yousra also appeared in several television dramas that aired during Ramadan, including the 2005 series Ahlam 'Adiya (Ordinary Dreams). In the show, she portrayed a con artist, a role described by Al-Ahram as "a major departure from the star's usual Ramadan screen persona, which has consistently verged on the romantic and the demure."

In 2006, Yousra played a supporting role in The Yacoubian Building, an adaptation of the novel of the same name. The film reportedly had one of the highest budgets in Egyptian cinema at the time. Playing an entertainer in a restaurant, Yousra, according to Variety, "effortlessly stirs old emotional waters when she sings 'La Vie en rose.'"

Yousra released her first vocal album in 2002. In 2017, she appeared in Abu's hit single 3 Daqat. In 2018, she starred in Ladayna Akwalon Okhra (We Have Another Statement). In 2019, Yousra and Saba Mubarak appeared in a Harper’s Bazaar Arabia photo shoot, both wearing evening gowns. In 2020, she starred in Saheb Al Maqam, her first film in eight years.

== Personal life ==
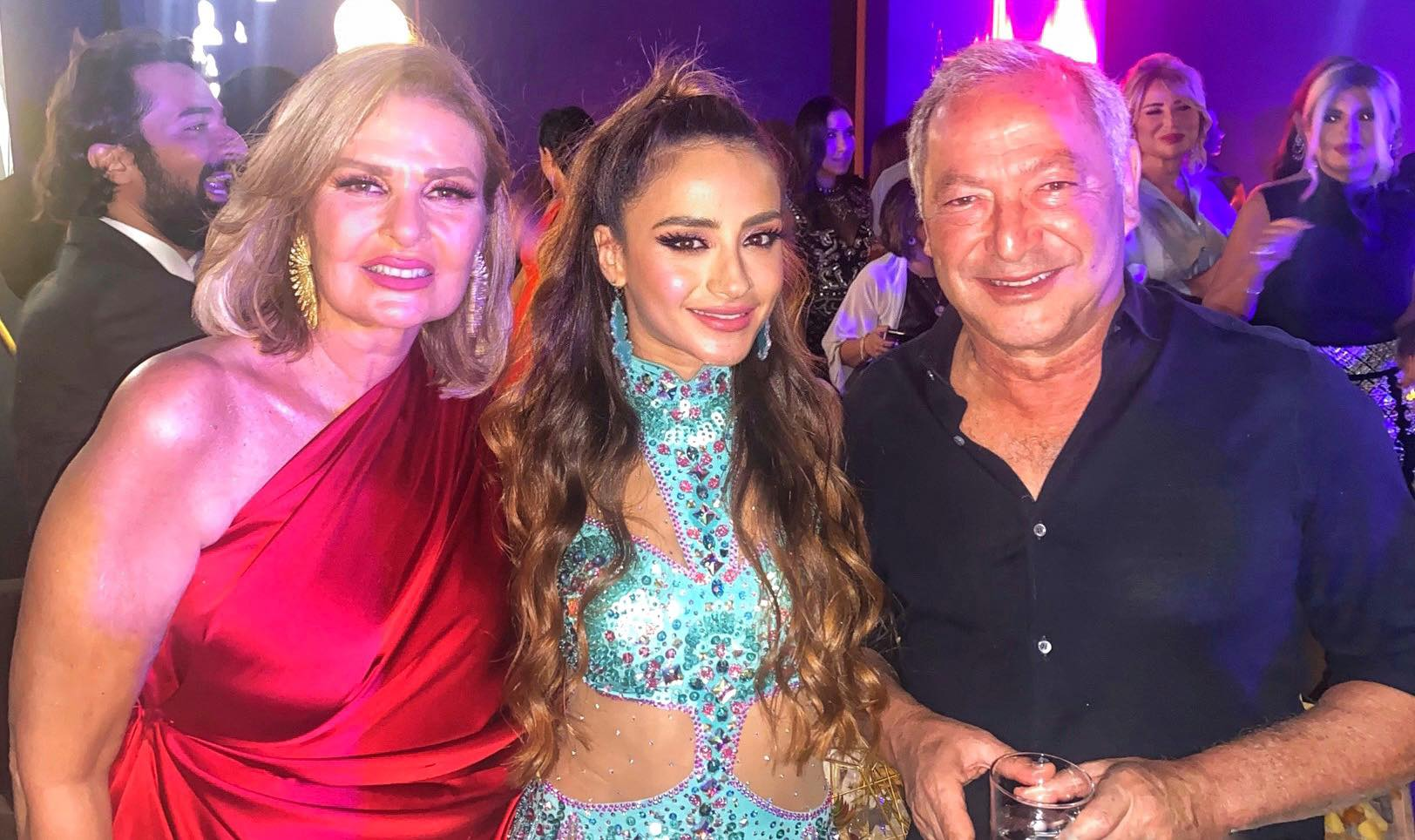
Yousra in 2021

Yousra is married to Khaled Selim and is the sister-in-law of actor Hesham Selim, the son of Egyptian footballer, actor, and former Al Ahly president Saleh Selim.

== Political views ==
Following the 2009 Egypt–Algeria World Cup dispute, Yousra expressed support for the Algeria national football team during the 2010 FIFA World Cup held in South Africa, despite tensions between Egypt and Algeria at the time. Earlier, she and Omar Sharif had participated in a protest against Algeria following accusations of misconduct against Egypt during a qualifying match between the two countries.

== Filmography ==
Year	Film	Translation / English Title
1977	Fatah Tabhath Aan Al-Hob	A Girl Searching for Love
1978	Ebtesama	Smile
1978	Shabab Yarkos Fawqa An-Nar	Youths Dancing on Fire
1979	Ushaq Al-Eshreen	Lovers under 20
1980	Amal Eh El-Hob Fi Baba	What Did Love Do for Dad?
1980	Qasr fi Al-Hawaa	A Mansion on Air
1981	Leilat Shitaa Dafeia	A Warm Winter Night
1981	El Insaan Yaeesh Mara Waheda	A Man Lives Only Once
1981	Karakoon Fi El Sharea	A Prison in the Street
1982	Shitan Al-Gazeera	The Island's Devil
1982	Ala bab Al-Wazeer	At the Minister's Door
1982	Hadoota Masriyyia	An Egyptian Story
1984	Al-Tha'r	Revenge
1984	Al Avocato	The Lawyer
1984	La Tasalny Man Ana	Don't Ask Me Who I Am
1985	Al Ins Wal Gen	Humans and Jinn
1985	As-Saaleeq	The Vagabonds
1985	Shaqat Al Ostaz Hasan	Mr. Hasan's Apartment
1986	Al Bedaya	The Beginning
1986	Al Galsa Al Serriya	The Secret Meeting
1986	Abl El Waddaa	Before Goodbye
1986	Wasmet Aar	Stigma
1987	At-Taweeza	Taweeza
1987	Al Laeeba	The Game
1987	Sekket En-Nadama	The Path of Remorse
1987	Asfoor Laho Aneyaab	A Bird with Teeth
1987	Li Adam Kefayet El Adellah	For Lack of Evidence
1987	Darb el Hawa	—
1988	Sarkhet Nadam	Cry of Remorse
1988	Emra'a Lel Asaf	Unfortunately, a Woman
1989	Iskendria Kaman Wi Kaman	Alexandria Again and Forever
1989	Kaboos	Nightmare
1990	El Moolid	The Mawlid
1990	Gizeeret El Shaitan	The Devil's Island
1991	Al-Ra'i wal Nisaa	The Shepherd and the Women
1991	Sayedat Al-Qahira	The Lady of Cairo
1992	Al-Shares	The Fierce
1992	Emra'a Ayela Lel Soqoot	A Woman Liable to Fall
1993	Al-Mansi	The Forgotten
1993	Mercedes	Mercedes
1993	Al Erhab Wi El-Kabab	Terrorism and Kebab
1993	Dehk Wa Le'b Wa Gad Wa Hob	Laughter, Play, Seriousness, and Love
1994	Al-Mohager	The Emigrant
1996	Teyoor Ez-Zalaam	Birds of Darkness
1996	Nazwa	Lust
1997	Eish el-Ghorab	The Mushroom
1998	Dantilla	—
1998	Risala Ela Al-Wali	A Message to the Wāli
1999	Kalam El Leil	Night Talk
2001	Al-Asefa	The Tempest
2001	Al-Warda Al-Hamra	The Red Rose
2002	Ma'ali al Wazir	His Excellency the Minister
2004	Iskendria New York	Alexandria... New York
2005	Kalam Fil Hob	Words on Love
2005	Dam El Ghazaal	The Gazelle's Blood
2006	Emaret Yaccobian	The Yacoubian Building
2006	Mateegy Nor'os	Let's Dance
2009	Bobbos	—
2012	Game Over	—
2020	Saheb Al Maqam	The Dignitary

== Television ==
Year	Title	Translation / English Title	Role
1979	Anf we Thalathat Eyoun	A Nose and Three Eyes	Amina
1994	Rafat Al-Haggan	Rafat Al-Haggan	Helen Samhoon
1996	Hayat El-Gohari	Al-Gohari's Life	Hayat
2000	Awan El Ward	The Time of Roses	Amal
2002	Ayna Qalbi	Where Is My Heart	Faten
2003	Malak Rohi	Angel of My Soul	Malak
2004	Leqa Ala El-Hawa	A Meeting on Air	Leqa
2005	Ahlam El-Adeya	Ordinary Dreams	Nadia Anzaha
2006	Lahazat Harega	Critical Moments	Sarah
2007	Adiyyet Ra'y Aam	A Matter of Public Opinion	Abla
2008	Fi Aydee Amina	In Safe Hands	Amina
2009	Khas Giddan	Up Close and Personal	Dr. Sherifa
2010	El Arabi Ma'a Yousra	The Arab with Yousra	Herself
2010	Bel Shamaa Al-Ahmar	In Red Wax	Dr. Fatma
2012	Sharbat Louz	Almond Sherbet	Sharbat
2014	Saraya Abdeen	Abdeen Palace	Khoshyar Hanim / El Walda Pasha
2016	Foq Mostawa El-Shobohat	Above Suspicion	Dr. Rahma
2017	El Hesab Yegma	A Score to Settle	Na'eema
2018	Awalem Khafeya	Hidden Worlds	Herself (guest)
2018	Ladayna Akwalon Okhra	We Have Further Comments	Amira Mansour
2020	Kheyanet Ahd	Betrayal of a Covenant	Ahed
2021	Harab Ahelya	Civil War	Mariam
2022	Ahlam Saeda	Sweet Dreams	Farida
