= List of Egyptian films of the 2010s =

The following is an incomplete list of Egyptian films of the 2010s. For an A-Z list of films currently on Wikipedia, see Category:Egyptian films.

== 2010s ==
Title	Director	Actors	Genre	Notability
2010
678	Mohamed Diab	Bushra, Nelly Karim, Maged El Kedwany	Drama	
Assal Eswed (Molasses)	Khalid Mar'iee	Ahmed Helmy, Edward, Lotfy Labib, Amy Samir Ghanem	Comedy	
Bolbol Hayran (A Bewildered Lovebird)	Khalid Mar'iee	Ahmed Helmy, Zeina, Shery Adel, Amy Samir Ghanem	Comedy	
El Khoroug (Cairo Exit)	Hesham Issawi	Mohamed Ramadan, Maryhan, Ahmed Bidder	Drama / Romance	
Noor Eieny (The Light of My Eyes)	Wael Ihsan	Tamer Hosny, Menna Shalabi	Drama / Romance	
Rassayel El Bahr (The Sea Messages)	Daoud Abdel Sayed	Asser Yassin, Basma, May Kassab	Drama	
Zahaymar (Alzheimer's)	Amr Arafa	Adel Emam, Nelly Karim, Ahmed Rezk, Fathy Abdel Wahab	Comedy / Drama	
2011
Asmaa	Amr Salama	Hend Sabri, Maged El Kedwany	Drama	
El Shoq (Lust)	Khaled El Hagar	Ahmed Azmi, Sawsan Badr, Ruby	Drama	
Tahrir 2011: The Good, the Bad, and the Politician	Tamer Ezzat, Ayten Amin, Amr Salama		Documentary	
X-Large	Sherif Arafa	Ahmed Helmy, Donia Samir Ghanem, Ibrahim Nasr	Comedy	
2012
Baad el Mawkeaa (After the Battle)	Yousry Nasrallah	Menna Shalabi, Bassem Samra, Nahed El Sebai	Drama	Entered into the 2012 Cannes Film Festival
Coming Forth by Day (Al-khoroug lel-nahar)	Hala Lotfi	Donia Maher, Salma Al-Naggar, Ahmad Lutfi	Drama	
2013
Fatat El Masnaa (film) (Factory Girl)	Mohamed Khan	Yasmin Raeis, Hany Adel, Salwa Khattab	Drama / Romance	
Cairo Drive	Sherief Elkhatsa	Ayman Samir, Karina Shalaby	Documentary	2013 Abu Dhabi Film Festival
2019
Qarmat Bitamrmat		Ahmed Adam	Comedy	
Pharaoh's Campaign		Amr Saad, Ruby	Action	
