= Safinaz =

American belly dancer and actor

- Born: Sofinar; 20 December 1983 (age 42); Armenia
- Children: Ashraf Al Zahrani, 2007

Sofinar Grigoryan (Armenian: Ծովինար Գրիգորեան), also known by her stage name Safinaz (Arabic: صافيناز), is an Armenian belly dancer that has appeared in several films since 2013.

== Career ==
Grigoryan started her career as a ballet dancer but then switched to belly dancing. She had international exposure with video clips on the satellite channel Dalaa. Her breakthrough came in 2013 with her appearance in the Egyptian film El Ashash that starred Mohamed Farrag and Horeya Farghaly. According to Google data, she was the name most searched by Egyptian Internet users in 2014, outperforming actor Khaled Saleh who died the same year.

== Egyptian flag controversy ==
In May 2014, Grigoryan was summoned for questioning by Egyptian prosecutors over a report alleging she insulted Egypt by wearing a dancing costume fashioned after the Egyptian flag. In April 2015, an Egyptian court sentenced her to six months in prison for 'insulting the Egyptian flag' after she wore a skin-tight dress in its red, white and black color scheme. In September 2015 she was acquitted of the charges. She has been accused of debauchery again as she was found dancing with two Egyptian fans in bikini and the video went viral.

== Most searched on Google ==
The dancer Safinaz topped the list of the most searched people on Google in Egypt in 2014, surpassing Khaled Saleh and Egyptian President Abdel Fattah El-Sisi.
