= Tholathy Adwa'a El Masrah =

- Other names: El Deif Ahmed, George Sidhom and Samir Ghanem
- Citizenship: Egypt
- Occupation(s): comedian, actor
- Notable work: Doctor Save Me

Tholathy Adwa'a El Masrah (Egyptian Arabic: ثلاثى أضواء المسرح) was an Egyptian stand-up comedy trio formed of the Egyptian comedians alongside El Deif Ahmed, George Sidhom and Samir Ghanem.

They performed various musical sketches, stand-up comedy shows, comedy plays and movies.

Their debut was Doctor Save Me, a short performance that introduced them to the world of fame.

They presented the first ever TV Ramadan Riddles, which continued for ten years and was written by Hussain El-Said.

Their most popular movies are 'Akher Shakawa', '30 Yom fel Segn', 'El Maganeen El Talata'.

After El Deif Ahmed's death in 1970, Ghanem and Sidhom continued under the same name (Tholathy Adwa'a El Masrah) until 1982.

== Notable plays ==
- Tabeekh El Malayka (The Angels' Cooking)
- El Ragel El Gawez Merato (The man who gave his wife in Marriage)
- Moseeqa Fel Hay El Sharey (Music in East District)
- Fondo' El Talat Wara'at (The Three Cards Hotel)
- Al-Mutazawwigun (Married)
- Ahlan ya Doctor (Welcome, Doctor)
