= El Deif Ahmed =

Egyptian actor (1936–1970)

- الضيف أحمد
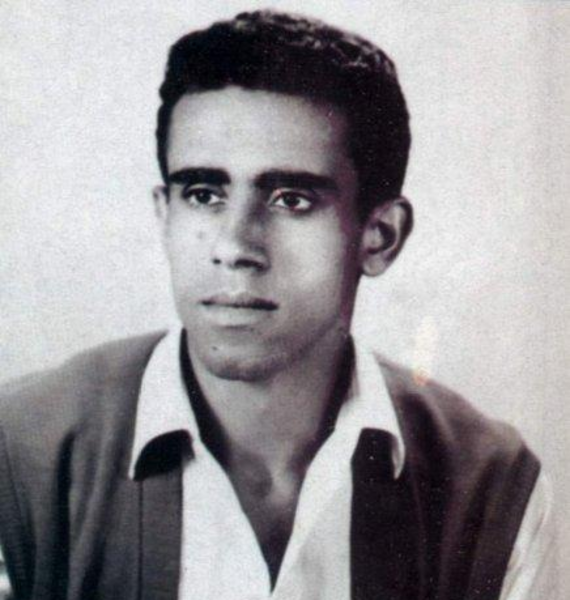
- Born: December 12, 1936; Temay Al Amdeed, Dakahliya, Egypt
- Died: April 6, 1970 (aged 33); Cairo, Egypt
- Education: Cairo University
- Occupation: Actor
- Children: 1

El Deif Ahmed, (Arabic: الضيف أحمد, December 12, 1936 – April 6, 1970) was an Egyptian actor. He was part of the variety comedy trio Tholathy Adwa'a El Masrah alongside George Sidhom and Samir Ghanem.

== Biography ==
Born in 1936 in El Dakahleya, Ahmed attended the Mansoura School For Boys. He then moved to Cairo to enroll in the Faculty of Arts in Cairo University, where he studied sociology and philosophy.

Ahmed obtained his degree in 1960, and started working on a Master's in English literature.

His first true encounter with fame came later, when he formed the ensemble Tholathy Adwa'a El Masrah, through which Samir Ghanem, George Sidhom and himself performed various musical sketches, stand-up comedy shows, comedy plays and movies. The troupe's debut was Doctor Save Me, a short performance that introduced them to the world of fame.

The ensemble also presented the first ever TV Ramadan Riddles and released several films, the most popular of which are Thalath Nesaa, Akher Shakawa, 30 Yom fel Segn and El Maganeen El Talata, also he appeared in several films on his own, most notable in Mirati Modeer Aam and Saghira ala El-Hob.

Ahmed died in 1970; he is survived by one daughter (El Deif Rasha). His troupe-mates Ghanem and Sidhom continued to perform as Tholathy Adwa'a El Masrah until 1982.

== Notable plays ==
- Ana we howa we heya (Me, him and her) with Fouad el-Mohandes, as a housekeeper.
- Tabeekh El Malayka (The Angels' Cooking)
- El Ragel El Gawez Merato (The man who gave his wife a Marriage).
