= Diamond Dust (2018 film) =

- تُراب الماس
- Directed by: Marwan Hamed
- Screenplay by: Ahmed Mourad
- Based on: Diamond Dust (novel) by Ahmed Mourad
- Starring: Asser Yassin; Menna Shalabi; Maged El Kedwany
- Cinematography: Hasan Amin
- Edited by: Ahmed Hafez
- Music by: Hesham Nazih
- Production company: New Century Production Dollar Film
- Release date: 2018
- Running time: 150
- Country: Egypt
- Language: Arabic

Diamond Dust is a 2018 Egyptian crime drama film directed by Marwan Hamed and based on the novel of the same name by Ahmed Mourad. The film stars Asser Yassin, Menna Shalabi, Maged El Kedwany, Mohamed Mamdouh, Eyad Nassar, and Adel Karam. It follows the story of Taha, a pharmacist who lives a normal life with his disabled father until he discovers a series of mysterious murders that lead him to a dark world of crime.

== Plot ==
Taha (Asser Yassin) lives in Cairo. He works as a pharmacist, In his free time he plays the drums and looks after his father, who is wheelchair-using and spends his days observing other people's lives through binoculars. When Taha returns home one morning, he finds his father dead – he has been murdered. The police soon drop their investigation, so Taha sets out to find the perpetrator himself. In the process, he learns about Cairo's darkest side, encountering cruelty and unscrupulousness, but also people who believe in change in a society devastated by corruption and clientelism.

== Cast ==
- Asser Yassin as Taha Hussein El-Zahar
- Menna Shalabi as Sara
- Maged El Kedwany as Colonel Walid Sultan
- Ahmed Kamal as Hussein Hanafy El-Zahar
- Mohamed Mamdouh as El-Sirvis
- Sabreen as Fayka El-Zahar
- Eyad Nassar as Sharif
- Adel Karam as Hani Birgas
- Bayoumi Fouad as Litoo
- Ezzat El Alaili as Mahroos
- Sherine Reda as Bushra
- Tara Emad as Tuna
- Rosaline Elbay as Tuna's Mother
- Mohamed El Sharnouby as Young Hussein
- Sami Meghawri as Hanafy El-Zahar
- Mahmoud El Bezzawy as Naeem
- Ahmed Khaled Saleh as Pharmacy Officer

== Reception ==
The film received positive reviews from critics and audiences, who praised the plot, the direction, the performances, and the cinematography. The film was also a commercial success, grossing over 60 million Egyptian pounds at the box office, making it one of the highest-grossing Egyptian films of 2018. The film won several awards, including Best Film, Best Director, Best Actor, and Best Screenplay at the Egyptian National Film Festival, and Best Film, Best Director, and Best Actor at the Arabian Cinema Awards.
