= Scheherazade, Tell Me a Story =

- Directed by: Yousry Nasrallah
- Screenplay by: Yousry Nasrallah
- Produced by: Misr Cinema Company
- Starring: Mona Zaki; Hassan El Raddad; Mahmoud Hemida; Hassan el-Imam; Sawsan Badr
- Cinematography: Samir Bahsan
- Edited by: Mona Rabi
- Music by: Tamer Karawan
- Release date: 24 June 2009
- Running time: 135 minutes
- Country: Egypt
- Language: Egyptian Arabic
- Box office: 12,200,000

Scheherazade, Tell Me a Story (Arabic: إحكي يا شهرزاد, translit. Ehki ya shahrazade) is a 2009 Egyptian film. The film was showing in 60 cinemas in Egypt in June.

== Synopsis ==
In modern Cairo, Hebba hosts an evening political talk show on Sun TV. Karim, her husband, is the deputy director of a newspaper that backs the Government; he dreams of soon being the director. However, it is made clear to him that his wife's political opinion's, that lean towards the opposition, are poorly received and could cost him his promotion. Using his charm and sex as tools, he convinces Hebba to choose social themes that will not affect the Government.

Unbeknownst to Karim, the collection of female stories Hebba decides to broadcast coincidentally prove political in nature. Tension between the two ensues and reveals the corruption of Karim's male-dominated world as Hebba becomes increasingly sympathetic to women very different from her.

== Themes ==
The most notable theme in the film is female support and community. As Hebba is able to reach out to more women to be interviewed on her show, Hebba develops a connection with the female community. Hebba ends the movie surrounded by women, and ready to stand up for herself against her husband's abuse. There is also the theme of globalization and its effects as seen in scenes, such as the one where Hebba and Karim are having lunch and are constantly distracted by the loud horn of the cruise ship behind them. In addition, we see glimpses of the female-on-female gaze. As Hebba is on the train with Selma, she receives many critical stares from the women in traditional dress. Hebba eventually feels so uncomfortable and takes the scarf she is offered to cover herself. Similarly, Karim experiences the male-on-male gaze. He is often seen flattering other men, who are his seniors as he wants to be the next editor-in-chief. He feels the pressure of his colleagues expecting him to attain this promotion. However, when he is told he did not receive it, his embarrassment becomes rage and leads to his abuse of Hebba.

Other worthy themes for analysis include the breakdown of the patriarchal bargain in Egyptian society. Throughout the many stories within the film, gendered expectations are placed upon the women while men only draw benefits and offer no support or protection as expected in the social contract of the patriarchal bargain. This loss of traditional values that would usually make the construct of marriage beneficial for both parties, diminishes marriage into an exploitative tool for men to control their wives. This loss of support for only exploitation can be understood as a commentary on the modern Egyptian government in which patriarchal protection typically expected from government is no longer provided and instead only operates to control and capitalize on its citizens.

Another notable theme is the challenge for women standing at the crossroads of tradition and modernity. One of these challenges described above is the devaluation of marriage in modern society along with establishment of female presence in the political world. Echoes of these ideas of tradition are emphasized by the trope this film aims to mimic, One Thousand and One Nights in which Scheherazade must tell series of stories to win the trust of a man sparing her life. This traditional narrative form still proves effective in modern society and similarly wins Hebba the trust of her husband for some time.

== Awards ==
- Venice Festival 2009
- Festival de los Tres Continentes (Nantes), Francia 2009
