= George Sidhom =

Egyptian comedian (1938–2020)

- Born: George Abees Sidhom; 28 May 1938; Girga, Kingdom of Egypt
- Died: 27 March 2020 (aged 81); Misr al-Jadīda, Egypt
- Occupation: Actor
- Spouses: Linda Makram

George Sidhom (Arabic: جورج سيدهم; 28 May 1938 – 27 March 2020), was a veteran Egyptian comedian.

== Early life ==
George Sidhom was born in Sohag, Egypt on 28 May 1938 and married Linda Makram, who is a pharmacist with whom he remained until his death in 2020.

Since childhood Sidhom loved acting and while he was in secondary school he became the head of the school's acting team. He received his Bachelor's degree from the Faculty of Agriculture, Ain Shams University in 1961.

While Sidhom was at college he took a role in TV program called "Dosh bared" (Cold Shower) which his social supervisor asked him to take a part in and in that program he met his colleagues Samir Ghanem, and El Deif Ahmed and the three later became Tholathy Adwa'a El Masrah.

== Career ==
George Sidhom's style of comedy was a mixture of slapstick comedy, sarcasm and playing the role of a daft person. He also utilised his physique at points, with emphasis on overeating. Through his career, he participated in various films 'Karamat Zawgaty' with Salah Zulfikar and Shadia, 'El-Bahth an Fediha' with Adel Emam, Samir Sabry and Mervat Amin, as well as multiple Christian films such as St Abanoub, and other films.

During his life, George did not believe that traditional publicity through banners and advertisement was enough and instead he used to drive his car with Samir Ghanem, and El Deif Ahmed to announce the next play that they were taking part in.

=== Tholathy Adwa'a El Masrah ===
Sidhom's first true encounter with fame, was when he formed 'Tholathy Adwa'a El Masrah' through which Samir Ghanem, El Deif Ahmed and he performed various musical sketches, stand-up comedy shows, comedy plays, and movies. Their debut was the Egyptian comedy sketch "Doctour Elhaa'ny" (Doctor Save Me), a short performance that introduced them to the world of fame.

Tholathy Adwa'a El Masrah presented the first-ever TV Ramadan Riddles and continued for ten years, written by Hussain El-Said. Their most popular movies are "Akher Shakawa" and "30 Yom fel Segn" plus "El Maganeen El Talata" (Egyptian titles).

After El Deif Ahmed's death on 6 April 1970, Ghanem and Sidhom continued under the same name (Tholathy Adwa'a El Masrah) until 1982. The two most famous plays by Tholathy Adwa'a El Masrah, after 1970, are;

- Mousiqa fi el-haii el-Sharqi (Music in East District)
- Fondo’ El-Talat Wara’at (Three Cards Hotel)
- Al-Mutazawwigun (The Married)
- Ahlan ya Doktor (Welcome Doctor)
- Julio & Romiette

=== Political Events Effects ===
==== Six-Day War ====
In 1967, George went into depression because of the Six-Day War in which Egypt was involved and he traveled to Alexandria where on his way he met Mohamed Hamdy Ashour, Governor of Alexandria at that time, who asked him to take a role in a theatrical play.

==== 1986 Egyptian conscripts riot ====
In 1986 Egypt went through security riots of the 1986 Egyptian conscripts riot during which Alhosabir Theater, where George invested most of his money, was set on fire. This event left George with a heart attack, as a result of which he had to travel to London to get treatment. After that event, Sidhom came back to Cairo where he opened a restaurant in 1987 in Egypt where the dishes were named after his theatrical plays.

=== Filmography ===
George participated in over 22 TV shows, 59 movies, 32 theater plays, 6 talk shows, and 5 radio plays.

Some of his work includes;

- 1966: 30 Days in Prison
- 1967: My Wife's Dignity
- 1967: Maabodat El Gamahir
- 1968: Al Zawaj ala El-Tarika El-Haditha
- 1973: Al-Bahth An Fadiha
- 1974: Fondo’ el-Talat Wara’at (Three Cards Hotel)
- 1977: Uncle Zizo Habibi
- 1978: Ragab fo' safeeh sakhen (ragab above a hot tinplate)
- 1978: Al-Motazawegoon (The Married)
- 1980: Qassr fel hawa' (a palace in the air)
- 1982: Al matooh (the idiot)
- 1982: Al-Garage (the garage)
- 1982: Gharib Fi Baity
- 1985: Al Shaqa Men Haa Al Zoga (The Apartment Belongs to the Wife)
- 1994: Hob Fel Takhsheeba

=== Retirement ===
In the mid-nineties the Tax Authority seized Sidhom's stage in an event at which he discovered that his brother Amir Sidhom mortgaged the stage without his awareness and traveled after that to United States. Because of this event George had a brain stroke that left him with paralysis in his right side of the body and affected his movement and speech which forced him to retire.

=== Last Appearance ===
Sidhom's last work was in a television advertisement for Pepsi in Ramadan of 2014, where he appeared alongside Samir Ghanem and Sherine where they dressed in similar clothes to what they wore in their actual play back in 1978.

== Death ==
Sidhom died on 27 March 2020 inside a private hospital in Heliopolis, Egypt after a long struggle with his health.

== See also ==
- List of Egyptian actors
- Egyptian cinema
