= I Love Cinema =

2004 film

- Directed by: Osama Fawzi
- Starring: Mahmoud Hemida
- Release dates: June 9, 2004
- Country: Egypt
- Language: English

I Love Cinema (Arabic: بحب السيما, romanized: baḥebb es-sīma [bæˈħebb esˈsiːmæ]) is a 2004 Egyptian film directed by Osama Fawzy starring Mahmoud Hemaidah and Laila Elwi. A comedy-drama with an emphasis on social, cultural and religion-related problems in Egyptian society, and introducing art as a savior.

== Plot ==
An Egyptian child living in Cairo discovers life and his passion towards cinema, living with his sexually frustrated mother and his hardline orthodox father who believes many things in life are sinful, including cinema.

== Cast ==
- Laila Elwi: Ne'mat
- Mahmoud Hemida: Adly
- Youssef Osman: Na'eem
- Menna Shalabi: Nousa Boushra
- Edward
- Aida Abdel Aziz: Ne'mat's mother
- Nadia Rafeek: Adly's mother
- Mohamed Dardeery: School principal
- Raouf Mustafa
- Zaki Fatin Abdel Wahab

== Awards ==
The movie was selected as Egypt's submission to the 77th Academy Awards for the Academy Award for Best Foreign Language Film, but was not accepted as a nominee. It gained mostly positive reviews from Egyptian critics and audience and won Horus Award in four categories at Cairo International Film Festival in 2005 including Best Director. It was entered to International Film Festival of Kerala in 2005 and was nominated for Golden Crow Pheasant.

== See also ==
- List of submissions to the 77th Academy Awards for Best Foreign Language Film
