= Menna Shalabi =

Egyptian actress (born 1982)

Menna Shalaby
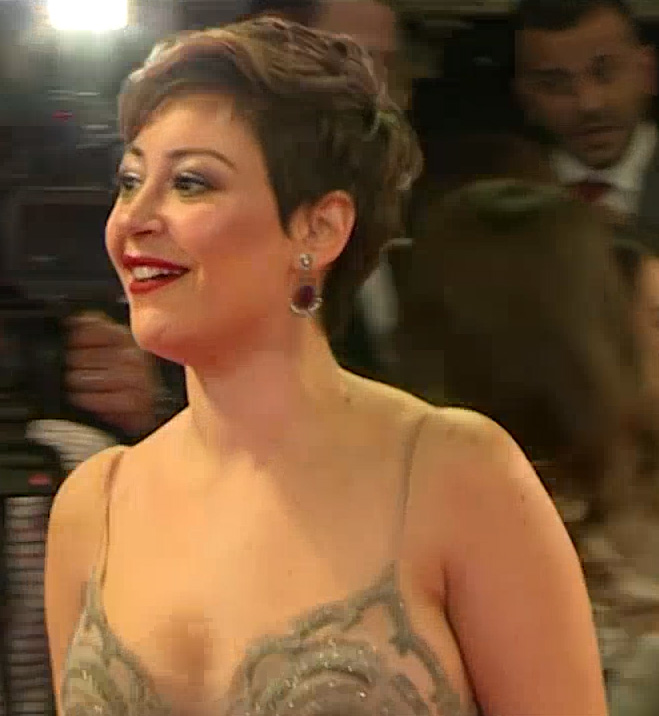
- Born: Mennah Hesham Shalaby; July 24, 1982 (age 44); Giza, Egypt
- Occupation: Actor
- Years active: 2001–present
- Spouse: Ahmed Elganainy (m. 2025)

Menna Hesham Shalaby (Arabic: منة هشام شلبي; 24 July 1982) is an Egyptian actress. She is featured in numerous film and TV productions.

Among her ventures, the television series Every Week Has a Friday, which earned her a nomination for an International Emmy Award, making Shalaby the first Egyptian nominee.

== Early life ==
Menna Shalabi was born in Giza to an artistic family. Her mother is actress Zizi Mustafa, her father is businessman Hesham Shalaby, and her aunt is media personality Poussy Shalabi. She began her acting career in 2000 when she was discovered by actress Samiha Ayoub, who introduced her in the series Salma Ya Salama. Before that, she appeared in television programs and children's puzzles.

== Career ==
After appearing in Salma Ya Salama (2000) and El Asifa (2001), Shalabi pursued her acting career with a role Morning and Evening Talk, aired in 2001, the miniseries was based on a story by Nobel laureate Naguib Mahfouz, a popular and widely viewed television drama miniseries at the time. Her cinematic debut was in The Magician (2001) with Mahmoud Abdel Aziz, followed by I Love Cinema (2004), Best of Times (2004).

In 2005, she appeared in five films, she co-starred in El-Haya Montaha El-lazza, Fi Mahatet Masr, which she starred alongside Karim Abdel Aziz, Abo El Arabi Wasal which she starred alongside Hany Ramzy. She also co-starred in Ahlam Omrena alongside Mona Zaki. She starred in Banat West Albalad by Mohamed Khan. In 2007, she starred in Youssef Chahine's Chaos, This Is (2007), screened at Venice Film Festival and Toronto International Film Festival. She also starred in Microphone (2010), the film received Best Arabic-language film Award from Cairo International Film Festival. She collaborated with Yousry Nasrallah in After the Battle (2012), which brought Egyptian cinema back to Cannes after a 15-year absence, and Brooks, Meadows and Lovely Faces (2016), which world premiered at the Locarno Film Festival before it was released in France and Switzerland. Among her most significant appearances was her role in Nawara (2015) directed by Hala Khalil, which brought her a record of 10 best actress awards. Afterwards, Shalabi starred in Marwan Hamed's films The Originals (2017), and Diamond Dust (2018), the film was a box-office hit. Keen on supporting emerging filmmakers, Shalaby performed the lead role in director Adam Abd Elghaffar's short film Fork and Knife (2018), which competed in the Short Films Competition at the 2nd El Gouna Film Festival in 2018.

Furthermore, Menna's filmography includes Scarecrow (2019), which marks her reunion with Ahmed Helmy after their last work together in Sorry to Disturb (2008). Shalaby's most successful TV roles include Friendly Fire (2013), Jewish Quarter (2015), and Sunset Oasis (2017). Aside from her acting profession, Menna has participated in various charity initiatives for persons with disabilities, raising awareness about the difficulties these people experience in Egyptian society.

Menna Shalabi played the female lead role of Sara in the 2024 romantic drama film El Hawa Sultan. Menna was also cast in Hepta 2, 7 Dogs, and in the movie the crime, in which Menna played a prominent main supporting/co-starring role as the wife of the leading actor Ahmed Ezz (actor). Menna played a female lead role as Dr. Salma in the television series Indigenous, which follows the intersection of an Egyptian doctor's life with a Palestinian man's during the Gaza war. The series became popular due to the real war between Palestine and Israel. The series was heavily criticized by Israel.

== Awards ==
Menna Shalaby has previously won numerous awards at national and international film festivals, including the Faten Hamama Excellence Award at the 41st Cairo International Film Festival (CIFF). She also won the Best Actress Award at the Egyptian National Film Festival for her roles in The Magician (2001) and An El Eshq Wel Hawaa (2006), as well as the Arabian Cinema Awards (ACA) and the Arab Star Festival for her role in Diamond Dust (2018), as well as the Dubai, Tetouan, Oran, and Cairo Film Society festivals for her role in Nawara (2015), and the Egyptian Catholic Center for Cinema Festival for her role in Downtown Girls (2005), for which she also won a Special Award at the Damascus International Film Festival.

Shalaby was also voted 'Best Actress' by the public in a number of surveys held by Arab and Egyptian publications and radio stations. In addition, she was honored by the Tetouan International Mediterranean Film Festival in Morocco and received an Honorary Award at the Aswan International Women's Film Festival (AIWFF) in 2019 for her remarkable cinematic career in Egypt and the Arab globe.

She also received multiple honors for her television roles, including the Critic's Award for Best Actress at the Arab Satellite Channels Festival for her performance in Sunset Oasis (2017). Shalaby has also served on juries for some of the world's most prestigious film festivals, including the Cairo International Film Festival, the Carthage Film Festival (Official Competition), the Malmö Arab Film Festival in Sweden (Feature-Length and Short Film Competition), and the El Gouna Film Festival (Feature Narrative Competition). Menna Shalaby is the first Arab Egyptian to be nominated for Emmy Awards.

== Personal life ==
Menna Shalaby is married to Ahmed Elganainy. She practices Islam.

=== Controversy ===
On 25 November 2022, she was arrested at Cairo International Airport for her possession of substances including Marijuana, after returning from New York City. However, she was released shortly after paying a bail of LE50K. In January 2023, she was sentenced to one year in prison and LE10K fine with suspension for three years by the North Cairo Criminal Court, due to obtaining illegal substances with the intention of using them. In May 2024, the Court of Cassation rendered her appeal, and although her jail term was upheld, it remained suspended.

== Selected filmography ==
=== Films ===
- 2001: El Saher (The Magician)
- 2003: Iw'a Wishshak (Watch Your Face)
- 2003: Film Hindi (An Indian Movie)
- 2003: Kallem mama (Call Mama)
- 2004: Enta Omry (My Soul Mate)
- 2004: Ahla Wl Awkat (The Best of Times)
- 2004: Shabab Takeaway (Takaway Guys)
- 2004: Baheb El Cima (I Love Cinema)
- 2005: El-Haya Montaha El-lazza (Joys of Life)
- 2005: Fi Mahatet Masr (At Cairo Station)
- 2005: Abo El Arabi Wasal (Abo El Arabi is Here)
- 2005: Ahlam Omrena (Dreams of Our Lives)
- 2005: Banat West Albalad (Downtown Girls)
- 2006: An El Eshq Wel Hawa (All About Love)
- 2006: Ouija
- 2007: Alawela fel Gharam (First in Love)
- 2007: Heya Fawda (Chaos, This Is)
- 2007: Keda Reda (Satisfied Like This)
- 2007: Wahed Mn El Nas (One of the People)
- 2008: Asef Ala Al Izaag (Sorry to Disturb)
- 2009: Badal Faqed (The Replacement)
- 2010: Microphone
- 2010: Nour Einy (The Light of My Eyes)
- 2011: Ezaet Hob (Love Station)
- 2011: Bibo and Beshir
- 2012: Baad El Mawkeaa (After The Battle)
- 2015: Nawara
- 2016: Al Ma' wal Khodra wal Wajh al Hassan (Brooks, Meadows and Lovely Faces)
- 2017: Al Asleyeen (The Originals)
- 2018: Shouka Wa Sekina (Fork & Knife)
- 2018: Torab El Mas (Diamond Dust)
- 2019: Khayal Maata (Scarecrow)
- 2021: Al'iins w Alnams (The Mongoose and The Human)
- 2022: El Gareema (The Crime)
- 2022: Men Agl Zizo ( For Ziko )
- 2024: El Hawa Sultan (Love Reigns Supreme)
- 2025: Hepta 2: El Monathara El Akheera
- 2026: 7 Dogs

=== Television ===
- 2026: Ashab Alard - (the owners of the land)

== See also ==
- Cinema of Egypt
