= Passant Shawky =

Egyptian actress

- Born: Passant Shawky بسنت شوقي; December 14, 1983 (age 42)
- Occupation: Actress
- Years active: 2011–present
- Spouse: Mohamed Farrag

Passant Shawky (born December 14, 1983) is an Egyptian actress.

== Early life ==
Passant studied Business Administration at the American University. In 2009, she traveled to Argentina to participate in the Fear Factor Xtreme Show.

In 2012, she joined a training course at Maggie Flanigan's studio in New York City, where she decided to act in cinema and television in 2013. She participated during this year in the series Arabic: اسم مؤقت.

== Career ==
Passant started her acting career in 2011 through the theatrical show Tales of Liberation with director Sundus Shabayek. She participated during this year in the series temporary name, and in the same year won her first movie championship through the movie Family Secrets after director Hani Fawzi discovered her.

Her participation in the most famous works of art such as Under Control, Stiva, Free Fall, Nelly and Sherihan, Earth Joe, Case C, Kalbash 2.

== Filmography ==
TV-Series/ Movies
| Year | Title | Notes |
|---|---|---|
| 2013 | Asrar Eayilia | Movie |
| 2013 | Aism Muaqat | Series |
| 2015 | Taht Alsaytara | Series |
| 2015 | Astifa | Series |
| 2016 | Naylli wa Sharihan | Series |
| 2016 | Suqut Hurin | Series |
| 2017 | 'Ardu Jawin | Series |
| 2019 | 'Ana Ahyri Dwt Kwm | Series |
| 2020 | Wanasny | Series |
| 2020 | Leh Laa | Series |
