= Mercedes (1993 film) =

1993 Egyptian film

- Directed by: Yousry Nasrallah
- Written by: Yousry Nasrallah
- Produced by: Gaby Khoury
- Starring: Yousra
- Cinematography: Ramses Marzouk
- Music by: Mohamed Noah
- Production company: Misr International Films
- Release date: 1993
- Country: Egypt
- Language: Egyptian Arabic

Mercedes is a 1993 Egyptian film written and directed by Yousry Nasrallah.

== Plot ==
A man called Noubi after the death of his father is set to search for his step brother to inherit the father's property. Noubi has to get to him before he is killed by his step mother.

== Cast ==
- Yousra
- Zaki Fatin Abdel Wahab
- Seif Abdelrahman
- Ahmad Kamal
- Abla Kamel
- Taheyya Kariokka
- Bassem Samra
- Magdy Kamel

== Reception ==
The film has been included in the 2006 Bibliotheca Alexandrina's 100 Greatest Egyptian Films.
