= Amy Samir Ghanem =

Egyptian actress (born 1987)

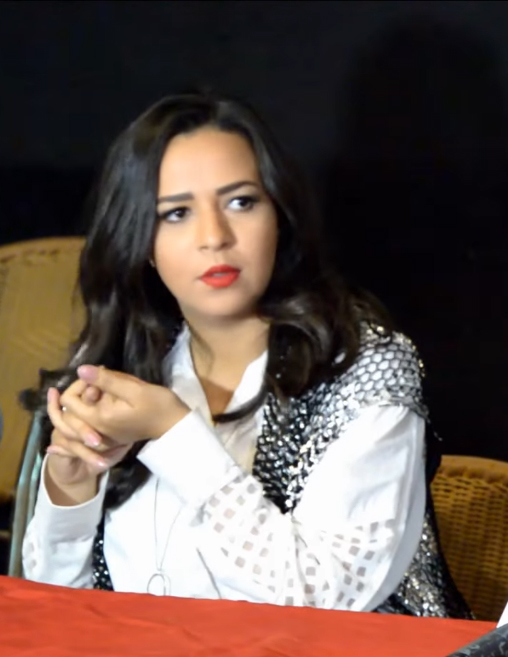
- Amy Samir Ghanem in 2016
- Born: 31 March 1987 (age 39); Cairo, Egypt
- Occupation: Actress
- Years active: 2005–present
- Spouse: Hassan El Raddad (m. 2016)
- Children: 1
- Parents: Samir Ghanem (father); Dalal Abdel Aziz (mother)
- Relatives: Donia Samir Ghanem (sister)

Amy Samir Ghanem (Arabic: إيمي سمير غانم; born 31 March 1987) is an Egyptian actress.

== Biography ==
Ghanem was born in Cairo in 1987 into an artistic family, her father was comedian Samir Ghanem (1937–2021), her mother was actress Dalal Abdel Aziz (1960–2021) and her sister is actress Donia Samir Ghanem. Since 2016, she has been married to actor Hassan El Raddad, with whom she has a child.

== Career ==
Amy was present in two scenes in Ahmed Helmy's 2010 movie Assal Eswed. She bas also played roles in works such as X Large (2011), Heba Rajul El Ghorab (2014) and Nelly and Sherihan (2016).

Amy Samir Ghanem is considered one of the most prominent comedic actresses in Egypt, having presented many works that gained the admiration of the audience and won numerous awards.

== Filmography ==
=== Cinema ===
- Assal Eswed (2010)
- Samir wa Shahir wa Bahir (2010)
- Bolbol Hayran (2010)
- X-Large (2011)
- Cima Ali Baba (2011)
- Ghesh Al Zawgeyya (2012)
- Taitah Rahibah (2012)
- Hatuli Ragel (2013)
- Zanqat Sittat (2015)
- Ashan Kharjee (2016)

=== Television ===
- Hekayat Beneeshha (2010)
- Nona El Mazouna (2011)
- Viva Atata (2014)
- Super Henedi (2014)
- Heba regl el ghorab (2014)
- Nelly and Sherihan (2016)
- Fi Al La La Land (2017)
- Azmi & Ashjan (2018)
- Oqbal Aandako (2025)
