= Lotfy Labib =

Egyptian actor (1947–2025)

- لطفي لبيب
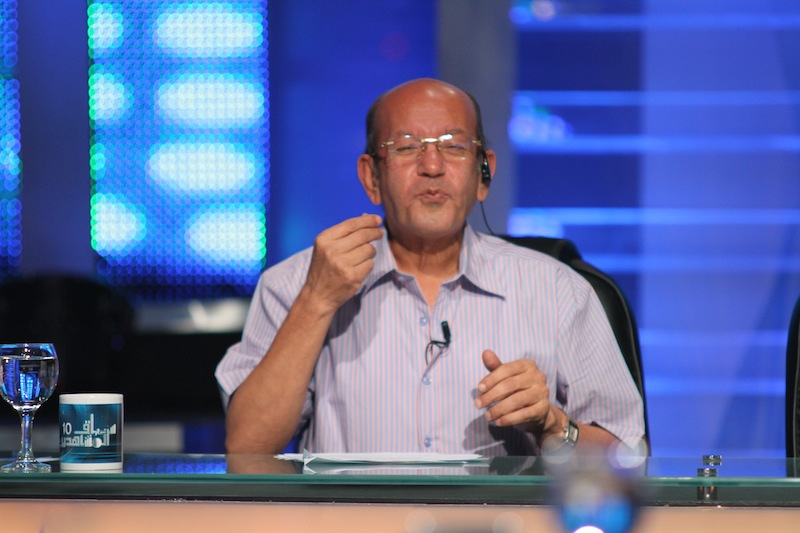
- Labib in 2010
- Born: 18 August 1947; Biba, Beni Suef, Egypt
- Died: 30 July 2025 (aged 77); Cairo, Egypt
- Education: Institute of Theatrical Arts
- Occupation: Actor
- Years active: 1981–2025

Lotfy Labib (Arabic: لطفي لبيب; 18 August 1947 – 30 July 2025) was an Egyptian Coptic Orthodox stage, television and film actor. He also worked as an announcer at one point.

== Life and career ==
Labib was born in Biba, Beni Suef. Despite having graduated from the Institute of Theatrical Arts in 1970, Labib's career was delayed for a whole decade. First, he was drafted in the army for six years where he participated in the 1973 October War, earning the Order of the Sinai Star, and then travelled outside Egypt to the United Arab Emirates for four years. His career truly started in 1981, when he acted in the play "The Bald Singer," which he followed with another stage production "The Hostages." Labib then worked profusely, in many supporting but memorable roles, with over 200 film and television credits. Though many of his screen appearances were brief, Labib performed admirably and showed himself to be one of the strongest performers of his generation. He appeared in 387 sequels (including series, film and radio) from 1988 until his death on 30 July 2025, at the age of 77.

== Selected filmography ==
Year	Title	Role	Notes
2005	The Embassy in the Building	David Cohen	
2007	Keda Reda	hindi	
2007	Doctor Omar's Gang	Doctor Fakhry	
2008	Andaleeb El Dokki	Guest Star	
2009	Amir El Behar	Nour (Amir’s father)	
2010	Assal Eswed	Radi	
2012	Baba	Sheikh Khaled	
2016	Mawlana	Khaled Abu Hadid	
