= Dalal Abdel Aziz =

Egyptian actress (1960–2021)

- Born: 17 January 1960; Farghan, Sharqia, United Arab Republic
- Died: 7 August 2021 (aged 61); Mohandiseen, Giza, Egypt
- Education: Zagazig University; Cairo University
- Occupation: Actor
- Years active: 1977–2021
- Spouse: Samir Ghanem (m. 1984; died 2021)
- Children: Donia Samir Ghanem; Amy Samir Ghanem

Dalal Abdel Aziz (Arabic: دلال عبد العزيز; 17 January 1960 – 7 August 2021) was an Egyptian actress. She was the wife of actor Samir Ghanem from 1984 until his death in 2021.

== Early life and education ==
Abdel Aziz was born on 17 January 1960 in Farghan, Sharqia, Egypt. She obtained her bachelor's degree from the Faculty of Agriculture at Zagazig University. She later studied at the Faculty of Mass Communication, English Literature and Political Science in the Cairo University.

== Career ==
Abdel Aziz entered the field of acting in 1977 with some small roles, including her role in the series "Bint Al Ayam", and her actual beginning was when artist Nour El Demerdash introduced her to theater. She collaborated in many artworks with her husband during the 1980s and early 1990s.

She then participated in many series, plays and films, such as “Akhoia hayes wana layes” (1992) play with Samir Ghanem, “Five-Star Thieves” (1994) with Salah Zulfikar in his final film role, followed by “Sleeping in Honey” (1996) with Adel Emam, and with these works she was able to obtain many awards as the best actress. Her last film was "Tasleem Ahali" (2022).

== Personal life and death ==
Abdel Aziz was married to actor Samir Ghanem in 1984; they were the parents of actresses Donia and Amy.

Ghanem died from complications of kidney functions and associated mucormycosis related to COVID-19 in El Safa Hospital, Mohandiseen, Giza on 20 May 2021, at the age of 84. Abdel Aziz herself died there the following 7 August, from complications related to COVID-19 100 days after infection.

== Selected filmography ==
=== Film ===
- 1980: The Accused
- 1983: The End of a Married Man
- 1984: Oh God, a Boy
- 1984: Hadi Badi
- 1984: The Judge's House
- 1985: Saving What Can Be Saved
- 1986: The Virgin Widow
- 1987: Girls of Gebelawi
- 1988: A Bird in the Sky
- 1988: The Female Police
- 1989: Our Gang Has No Other Branch
- 1992: The Conflict of Wives
- 1992: A Man of Fire
- 1994: Five-Star Thieves
- 1995: Baltiyya Bint Bahri
- 1996: Sleeping in Honey
- 1996: Time and Dogs
- 1998: Mabrouk and Bulbul
- 2001: A Girl's Secret
- 2008: Sorry to Disturb
- 2010: No Retreat, No Surrender
- 2010: Birds of the Nile
- 2010: Samir, Shahir, and Bahir
- 2013: The Straw
- 2014: Made in Egypt
- 2017: Good and Blessing
- 2018: Karma
- 2018: The Suit
- 2021: Firq Khebra
- 2022: Tasleem Ahali

=== Television ===
- 1977: Daughter of the Days
- 1980: Congratulations, You Have a Boy
- 1983: Amr ibn al-As
- 1983: The Journey 83
- 1985: Layali El-Helmiya (Part 1)
- 1987: Layali El-Helmiya (Part 2)
- 1994: No
- 1995: There's a Man in Our House
- 1995: One Thousand and One Nights
- 1996: Patience in the Salt Marshes
- 1997: Saad the Orphan
- 1998: Daughters of Souad Hanem
- 2000: The Call of the Rose
- 2000: Hell is a Man
- 2001: Justice Has Many Faces
- 2001: Morning and Evening Talk
- 2002: The Time of Imad Eddin
- 2002: Forget the Past, Farhat
- 2003: The People of Kafr Askar
- 2003: Abduction
- 2009: Ibn Al-Arandaly
- 2011: Doran Shubra
- 2012: Critical Moments
- 2012: Arafa The Sea
- 2013: Al Kabeer Awy 3
- 2015: Lahfa
- 2015: Haq Meit
- 2016: Nelly and Sherihan
- 2017: In La La Land
- 2017: Esh Eblis
- 2017: Seventh Neighbor
- 2018: Land of Hypocrisy
- 2019: Badal El Hadouta Talata
- 2020: Jama Salem
- 2020: Valentino
- 2021: In Our House, a Robot
- 2021: Kings of Gangsterism

=== Plays ===
- 1979: Humanitarian Service
- 1980: The Trap of Marital Happiness
- 1981: Hello, Doctor
- 1984: Marriage with Profit Sharing
- 1985: My Love, Hala
- 1987: Fares and Bani Khaiban
- 1992: My Brother Is Upset, and I'm Not
- 1994: Love in the Wood
- 1998: An Italian Marriage
