= The Crime (film) =

- الجريمة
- Directed by: Sherif Arafa
- Written by: Sherif Arafa
- Produced by: Hisham Abdel Khalek
- Starring: Ahmed Ezz; Menna Shalabi; Maged El Kedwany; Ryad El Khouly; Sayed Ragab
- Cinematography: Abd El-Salam Mousa
- Edited by: Dalia el-Nasser
- Music by: Amine Bouhafa
- Release date: January 5, 2022
- Running time: 125 minutes
- Country: Egypt
- Language: Arabic
- Box office: 27,210,498 Egyptian pounds

The Crime (Arabic: الجريمة, transliterated as El-Gareema) is a 2022 Egyptian film. The film is directed and written by Sherif Arafa, and it stars Ahmed Ezz, Menna Shalabi, Maged El Kedwany, Ryad El Khouly, and Sayed Ragab. The film was released on January 5, 2022, in Egypt and on January 20, 2022, in the Gulf states.

== Cast ==
- Ahmed Ezz
- Menna Shalabi
- Maged El Kedwany
- Ryad El Khouly
- Sayed Ragab
- Hajjaj Abdul Azim
- Mohamed Gomaa
- Myrna Noureldin
- Mohamed El Sharnouby
- Nardin Farag
- Omar Sharif
- Sherif Kholosy

== Synopsis ==
The film takes place in the 1970s and centers on a man named Adel who has hallucinations and is institutionalized. He escapes his mental hospital and becomes a well-paid perpetrator of contract killing and other crimes for hire. One crime he is embroiled in causes him to confess to prior offenses, bringing him into conflict with his former sponsors.

== Production and marketing ==
The first trailer for the movie was released on October 26, 2021.
