= Donia Samir Ghanem =

Egyptian actress and singer (born 1985)

- دنيا سمير غانم
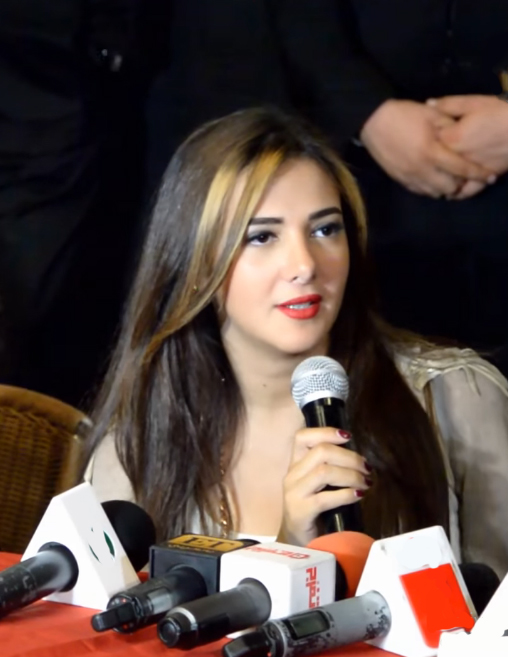
- Donia Samir Ghanem in a press conference in 2016
- Born: Donia Samir Youssef Ghanem; 1 January 1985 (age 41); Cairo, Egypt
- Education: MSA University
- Occupations: Singer; actress
- Years active: 1995–present
- Spouse: Ramy Radwan (m. 2013)
- Children: 1
- Parents: Samir Ghanem (father); Dalal Abdel Aziz (mother)
- Relatives: Amy Samir Ghanem (sister)

Donia Samir Youssef Ghanem (Arabic: دنيا سمير يوسف غانم; born 1 January 1985) is an Egyptian actress and singer. She is the daughter of actor Samir Ghanem and actress Dalal Abdel Aziz, and the sister of Amy.

== Acting career ==
Donia graduated from MSA University and began her artistic life in 2001 when she was 16. She had her first role in a TV series called Justice Has Many Faces (Arabic: للعدالة وجوه كثيرة, romanized: Li-l-ʿadāla wujūh kathīra), with which she attracted attention. Her first appearance in a film was in 2005 with the comedian Mohamed Henedi.

She was quickly put on the frontline to share the lead with some of the biggest cinema stars in comedy/romance hits like Yana Ya Khalty with Mohamed Henedi, X-Large and Laff W-Dawaran with Ahmed Helmy, 365 Youm Sa'ada with Ahmed Ezz. She was in the main cast in the series Nelly and Sherihan, for which she received widespread acclaim.

She has assumed roles in several cinematic and television productions. She has also presented several songs. Her profile was raised by her performances in Cabaret and Al Farah. More recently, she has acted in Teer Enta and has become recognized as one of the premier performers of her generation. Donia Samir Ghanem's pairing with Ahmed Mekky introduced some of the two stars' most important comedy films; Teer Enta and La Taraga' Wala Esteslam, in addition to dominating multiple TV seasons with the series El-Kebeer Awi.

After Mekky's era, Donia Samir Ghanem confirmed her place among the most favored TV stars, especially during Ramadan season, enjoying a bigger creative space in various entertainment talents like singing and dancing in successive smash hits; Lahfa, Nelly and Sherihan, Fil Lala Land and Badal El-Hdaoutah Talata.

Through appearances in various Egyptian talk shows, Donia stood out for her mimicry of other Arab singers. Her most famous imitation was of Ahlam's voice singing Myriam Fares's song "Far2 el Sen". She was a judge on the 4th season (2015) of The X Factor Arabia along with Lebanese singers Elissa and Ragheb Alama.

In January 2022, Donia Samir Ghanem and her sister Amy received the honoring award of their parents late veteran actors Samir Ghanem and Dalal Abdel Aziz from the Joy Awards in Riyadh.

== Filmography ==
=== Film ===
Year	Title	Role	Notes
2005	Yana ya Khalty	Nawal	
2008	Cabaret	Mona	
2008	Street 18	Aiaa	
2009	El Farah	Samira	
2009	You Fly	Laila	
2009	Ezbet Adam	Mariam	
2010	No Retreat, No Surrend	Jermin	
2011	X-Large	Dina	
2011	365 Days of Happiness	Nesma	
2014	Shad Agzaa	Aya	Special appearance
2016	Laf w Dawaran	Leela	
2019	The Knight & The Princess	Princess Lubna	Voice role
2022	Tasleem Ahaly	Zahia	
2025	Rocky El Ghalaba		

=== Television ===
Year	Title	Role
1995	(A Woman and a Woman)	Nadian
2001	(Many Faces of Justice)	Nada
2002	(The Era of Emad El-Din)	Fardos
2004	(Abbas El Abiad in the Black Day)	Laila
2004	(Girls' Dreams)	Dolly
2007	(Maryam's Sorrows)	Hanan
2008	(Two in One)	Heba
2008	(Café Chino)	Laially
2010	(El-Kabir Awi, Season 1)	Hadeya
2011	(El-Kabir Awi, Season 2)	Hadeya
2013	(Amir and the Journey of Legends)	Nefertiti
2013	(El-Kabir Awi, Season 3)	Hadeya
2014	(El-Kabir Awi, Season 4)	Hadeya
2015	(Lahfa)	Lahfa
2016	(Nelly and Sherihan)	Nelly
2017	(In La La Land)	Etab
2019	(Instead of Three Tales)	Bella/Lahfa/Louly
2023	(Get Salima)	Salima
2023	(Marriage War)	Jouri
2025	(Aisha Takes the Role)	Aisha
