= Zaki Fatin Abdel Wahab =

Egyptian actor and film director (1961–2022)

- Born: 18 February 1961; Cairo, Egypt
- Died: 20 March 2022 (aged 61)
- Education: Cairo Higher Institute of Cinema
- Occupations: Actor, film director
- Years active: 1981–2022
- Notable work: I Love Cinema
- Spouse: Soad Hosny (m. 1981)

Zaki Fatin Abdel Wahab (Arabic: زكي فطين عبد الوهاب; 18 February 1961 – 20 March 2022) was an Egyptian actor and film director.

== Biography ==
The son of the singer and actress Leila Mourad and film director Fatin Abdel Wahab was born on 18 February 1961. He graduated from the Directing Department of the Cairo Higher Institute of Cinema in 1983.

He worked as a second assistant director in the movie People on the Top (1981) and as an assistant director in many Youssef Chahine's films, including The Sixth Day (1986), in which he made his debut as an actor. In 1996, Zaki directed his feature film "Romantica", which was a biography of his life.

== Personal life ==
Zaki married actress Soad Hosny, after she separated from the film director Ali Badrakhan. However, they separated after only a few months of marriage, and Zaki stated in more than one interview that the reason was his mother's opposition. He died on 20 March 2022, after suffering from lung cancer.

== Selected filmography ==
=== Films ===
- The Sixth Day (1986) as Anwar Wagdy
- Alexandria Again and Forever (1989) as Guindi
- Mercedes (1993)
- I Love Cinema (2004)
- The Spider (2022)

=== Television ===
- Ruby (TV series) (2012)

== See also ==
- Cinema of Egypt
- List of Egyptian films of the 2000s
