= Mohamed El Sharnouby =

Egyptian actor and singer (born 1995)

- محمد الشرنوبي
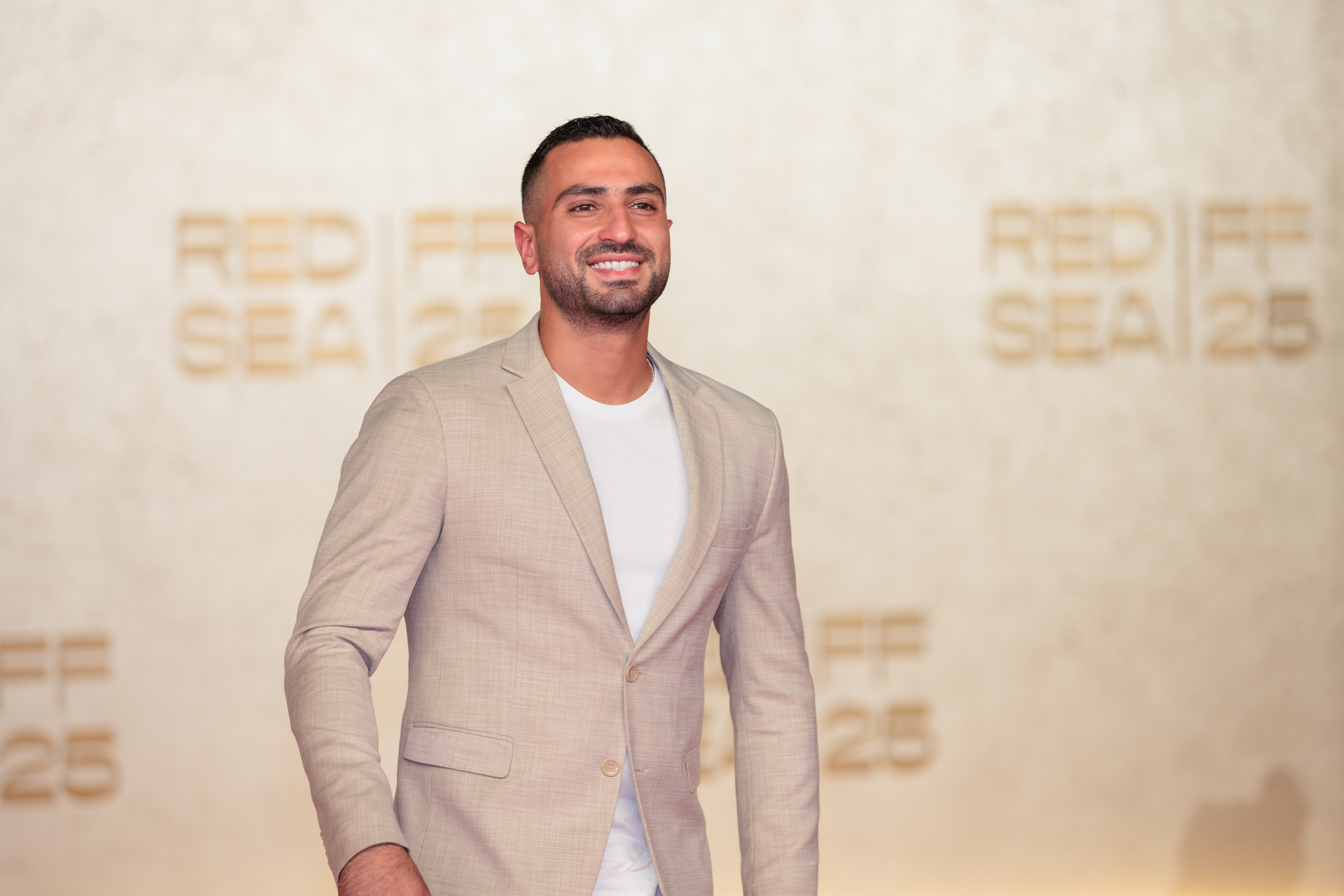
- Born: January 4, 1995 (age 31); Mohandiseen, Giza, Egypt
- Occupations: Actor, singer

Mohamed El Sharnouby (born January 4, 1995) is an Egyptian actor and singer.

As a musical artist, he is signed to Sout El-Hob Records.

Shanouby made his acting debut in the television series Ateya’s Agency in 2008.

== Personal life ==
His father is Egyptian composer Farouk El Sharnouby.

== Filmography ==
=== Film ===
Year(s)	Title	Role	Notes	Ref.
2016	Brooks, Meadows and Lovely Faces	—		
2018	Diamond Dust	Young Hussein		
2021	Different Experience	—		
2022	11:11	Zayn		
2022	The Crime	—		

=== Television ===
Year(s)	Title	Role	Notes	Ref.
2008	Ateya's Agency	—		
2015	Saraya Abdeen	—	Season 2	
2022	Faten Amal Harby	—		

== Discography ==
- Zay el-Fesool el-Arba`a (Like the Four Seasons; 2019)
