= Keda Reda =

Egyptian Romantic Comedy Film

- Promotional Poster
- Directed by: Ahmed Nader Galal
- Written by: Ahmed Fahmy
- Produced by: Albatrous Film Production; Brothers United for Cinema
- Starring: Ahmed Helmy; Menna Shalabi; Lotfy Labib; Khaled El Sawy
- Music by: Amr Ismail
- Distributed by: Brothers United for Cinema
- Release date: 1 August 2007 (Egypt)
- Running time: 90 minutes
- Country: Egypt
- Language: Arabic

Keda Reda is a 2007 Egyptian romantic comedy film starring Ahmed Helmy, Menna Shalabi. It has a very simple story about 3 identical triplets. It stars comedian Ahmed Helmy playing all three.

The film made it to the top of the Egyptian box office, as it earned more than E£20 million The story was inspired by the American film Matchstick Men.

== Plot ==
Semsem (an introvert), Bibo (a soccer fan) and Prince (a 1900s clothes and action fan) are three identical triplets. Their mother died shortly after their birth, and to avoid military conscription, their father made the three pretend to be one single person when out in public. No one except their father knows of the triplets' existence.

In public, they are all named Reda (and hence the title of the film), and all compete to win the heart of one beautiful girl, played by Menna Shalabi. Since each of the three has distinct personalities and interests, they each invite the girl to separate kinds of dates, splitting themselves based on days of the week. Problems ensue when each triplet does not know what the other two did on each previous date.

Now adults, they plan schemes to earn money, ranging from simple scams and culminating in a bank robbery. In doing so accidentally uncover a criminal conspiracy headed by a psychiatrist which one of them is seeing.

== Cast ==
- Ahmed Helmy
- Menna Shalabi
- Lotfy Labib
- Tayem ahmed
