= Sabreen (actress) =

Egyptian actress (born 1967)

- صابرين
- Born: October 4, 1967 (age 58); Cairo, Egypt
- Occupation: Actress
- Children: 4
- Relatives: Naima Akef (first cousin once removed)

Sabreen (Arabic: صابرين; born October 4, 1967) is an Egyptian actress.

== Biography ==
Sabreen's mother was the cousin of the renowned artist Naima Akef. She grew up within the Akef family, a clan celebrated for its circus arts, and began her acting career at the age of four, taking on minor roles.

In 1999, she portrayed singer Umm Kulthum in a biographical series chronicling the icon's personal life called Umm Kulthum.

== Selected filmography ==
=== Film ===
Year(s)	Title	Role	Notes	Ref.
2016	Brooks, Meadows and Lovely Faces	Fayka El-Zahar		
2018	Diamond Dust	—		
2021	My Bride	Dalilah's mother		
2021	200 Pounds	Sabreen	Playing herself	

=== Television ===
Year(s)	Title	Role	Notes	Ref.
1992	Al Helmeya Nights	—	Season 4	
2016	Wedding Song	Halema		
