= HIV/AIDS in Egypt =

With less than 1 percent of the population estimated to be HIV-positive, Egypt is a low-HIV-prevalence country. However, between the years 2006 and 2011, HIV prevalence rates in Egypt increased tenfold. Until 2011, the average number of new cases of HIV in Egypt was 400 per year, but in 2012 and 2013, it increased to about 600 new cases, and in 2014, it reached 880 new cases per year. According to 2016 statistics from UNAIDS, there are about 11,000 people currently living with HIV in Egypt. The Ministry of Health and Population reported in 2020 up to 13,000 Egyptians are living with HIV/AIDS. However, unsafe behaviors among most-at-risk populations and limited condom usage among the general population place Egypt at risk of a broader epidemic.

Among officially reported cases, heterosexual intercourse is the primary mode of transmission of HIV (49.1 percent), followed by homosexual intercourse (22.9 percent), renal dialysis (12 percent), and blood transfusion (6.2 percent), according to the National Aids Program (NAP) in an official report issued in January 2008. Males are four times more likely to have HIV than females, but this may be due to more men being tested than women. Other people likely to be exposed to HIV in Egypt include street children, prisoners, and refugees. A United States Agency for International Development (USAID) funded Biological-Behavioral Surveillance Survey was conducted by the Ministry of Health and Population (MOHP) to explore HIV prevalence rates among most-at-risk groups. The survey targeted street children, female sex workers (FSWs), men who have sex with men (MSM), and injecting drug users (IDUs). The study identified an infection rate of 6.9 percent and 7.7 percent in MSM and intravenous drug users respectively. These statistics fuel some of the hypotheses that there is a concentrated HIV epidemic occurring in Egypt among high-risk groups, but due to social stigma and lack of prevalence data, it is not acknowledged. Nonetheless, over time, the Egyptian government has made efforts to improve the lives of people with HIV and AIDS in the country.

== History ==
Egypt reported its first case of HIV/AIDS in 1986. This was about the same time that other countries in the Middle East and North Africa region also started seeing their first cases of HIV. In 1987, one year after the discovery of the disease in Egypt, the National Aids Program (NAP) in Egypt was formed. By March 1993, there were 359 people infected with HIV. In 1990, the NAP tested over 135,000 blood bags and only four were HIV positive. Still, many of the early cases came from infected blood products or dialysis. In 1993, approximately 60 kidney dialysis patients became infected with HIV, while in 1997 about 20 people became HIV positive from infected blood transfusions.

=== Middle East and North Africa (MENA) region ===
In the early 1990s several studies suggested that there was overall a very low, presence of HIV in the MENA region. By the end of 1996 only 27,000 people in the region died of HIV related causes while in Europe and sub-Saharan Africa that number was 170,000 and 4.6 million respectively. But, over time, research revealed that there were more HIV cases in the region than accounted for. Still, the HIV prevalence rate in MENA is less than that of tuberculosis and diabetes. In 2009, the United Nations Development Program placed the MENA region in the lowest category for antiretroviral therapy (ART) access in the years 2003–2006, but access has improved over time. Even though great progress has been made in the HIV continuum and the general understanding of the disease globally, progress in the MENA region has been limited due to lack of data and surrounding controversy. While it is estimated that only two percent of people with HIV are from the MENA area, the region has one of the fastest growing epidemics. Initially, many people were unconcerned about the disease due to its stigmatization, allowing the HIV epidemic to become more of an issue as time progressed. This is especially true in the MENA region where people thought, and some still do, that HIV only effects marginalized groups such as MSM and IDUs. Thus, those who didn't identify with these groups dismissed HIV as an insignificant issue.

== HIV transmission and prevention ==
In Egypt, HIV is most prevalent in high risk groups including street children, female sex workers (FSWs), men who have sex with men (MSM), and injecting drug users (IDUs). Globally, the average percentage of HIV infections through blood transfusions/products is only 5 percent. However, in Egypt, about 24 percent of all its known HIV cases are from infected blood products. There have also been five outbreaks in renal dialysis because of unsterile equipment. While the MOHP established an infection control program in 2003, controlling these infections is still challenging due to lack of training, proper equipment, and the fragile Egyptian health care system. In regards to intravenous drug use, between 16 percent and 41 percent of recreational drug users in Egypt use injected drugs, and about half of those have shared or reused syringes. One study explored sexual relations within the Egyptian population to determine prominence of HIV transmission and found that of the 74 percent in the study that were sexually active, 15 percent had more than three partners in the last month and 58 percent had never used a condom. About 26 percent of all HIV cases in Egypt occur in MSM and studies conducted by the NAP revealed very low rates of condom usage, along with multiple sexual partners among the MSM population. Additionally, many of the transmission cases are due to disease and to foreigners visiting or citizens living outside of the country, fueling some people's beliefs that HIV is a western disease. Although HIV prevention is not as comprehensive in Egypt as other parts of the world, the conservative religious beliefs in the country, both of the Muslim majority and the Coptic minority, provide their own form of protection. For instance, they frown upon promiscuity, homosexuality, and sex before marriage. These religious norms, along with widespread male circumcision, have resulted in decreased HIV transmission rates. However, over-reliance on the protection created by religious and cultural values has made HIV stigma and denial a problem. The protection that these values provide is counterbalanced by the stigma and discrimination that accompany those who defy these boundaries, leading to less HIV testing and treatment. Thus, the overall net impact on prevention is modest.

== Societal stigma ==
Egypt still faces several challenges in maintaining low prevalence of HIV/AIDS. There is a general reluctance on the part of the government and civil society to discuss issues related to marginalized groups such as MSM, FSWs, and IDUs. The conservative nature of Egyptian society stigmatizes these high-risk groups, making HIV surveillance studies in Egypt more difficult. The General Penalties Laws in Egypt criminalize prostitution and intravenous drug use, as many other countries do. However, there are also other laws that criminalize homosexual activity, stating that it is inappropriate social conduct and an insult to religion. In some parts of Egyptian society, it is considered immoral to have HIV. Additionally, the mortality of people with HIV only seemed to justify the conservative society's view of homosexuality and promiscuity as sinful actions. These views further the cloud of stigma and shame associated with having HIV in Egypt and prevent people from utilizing the HIV testing services.

In addition, there a lack of effective STI/HIV/AIDS education programs and other preventive measures, such as peer education, outreach work, and behavior change communications among at-risk groups. This stems from the lack of overall knowledge about the disease. According to recent studies, there is an imminent need for improved education of healthcare workers about HIV/AIDS in Egypt. Specifically, a 2016 study performed at Tanta University Hospital in Tanta, Egypt revealed that there were high levels of discrimination and stigma against people living with HIV among health care workers. Overall, of the 310 studied participants, 40 percent said that they would be worried about providing care to HIV patients. About 21.3 percent said they would be worried about touching cloths of patients with HIV, 27.4 percent said they'd be scared to get blood samples from people with HIV, and 26.4 percent said they'd be worried to dress HIV patients' wounds. Additionally, 34.8 percent of the physicians studied and 65.8 percent of the nurses believed that irresponsible behavior led to patients' HIV infections.

A collaboration between UNAIDS, the Egyptian Ministry of Health, and numerous Egyptian universities was established to help better train medical personnel to deal with the disease, as a way to fight the present stigma and misconceptions. Additionally, the lack of knowledge about the disease among Egyptian youth has the potential of greatly broadening the epidemic. In 2010, there were over 1,500 Egyptian youth (ages 15–24) with HIV. While only 11% of HIV cases in Egypt are among the youth, the early average age of sexual initiation, and increasing tendencies of premarital sex could augment these rates.

== HIV testing and treatment ==
Because of the stigma around the disease, many people in Egypt are afraid to get tested for HIV. In the years before 2004, the majority of HIV cases recorded in Egypt were due to mandated testing, such as for blood donors, foreigners staying in the country for more than six months, and citizens applying for permits to work overseas. Even though voluntary testing was available, people were discouraged from utilizing these services because of the requirement that those who tested positive be identified and reported to the MOHP. According to UNAIDS statistics, about 6,500 people know of their HIV positive status, which is 57 percent of those who are infected. In 2005, the MOHP, with the help of Family Health International (An Egyptian organization funded by U.S. Agency for International Development), established a system of voluntary confidential counseling and testing (VCCT) for anonymous testing, which encouraged more people to find out their HIV status. Moreover, many people who get diagnosed with Tuberculosis get tested for HIV. More specifically, in 2010 about half of the TB patients got tested for HIV. Currently, less than 1 percent of adult TB patients are HIV-positive. However, continued monitoring is necessary because an increase in the incidence of HIV-TB co-infection could add to the complexity of fighting both diseases in Egypt.

By the end of 2006, according to UNAIDS, 22 percent of HIV-infected women and men were receiving antiretroviral therapy (ART). In 2014, about 1,323 people received ART treatment. In 2016, that number increased to 3,100 people, which is about 27 percent of the infected population. In 2010, a qualitative study was conducted to gather data about ART adherence and limitations. They interviewed 27 HIV positive Egyptian women who had been receiving ART for at least three months. The results showed that there were five key factors that served as obstacles to adherence to treatment, which were "fear of stigma, financial constraints, characteristics of ART, social support, and reliance on faith."

== National response ==
=== National Aids Program (NAP) ===
The NAP is the official governmental body responsible for HIV/AIDS prevention. Its goal is to maintain the low prevalence of HIV/AIDS and improve health care services for those infected or affected by the disease. It performs blood screening, provides free antiretorviral therapy (ART) for those infected, encourages HIV testing, and provides support for those with HIV and their families. The organization also aims to raise awareness about HIV in the general public and among high risk groups, using mass media as one of the means of doing so. Additionally, they established anonymous hotlines, distributed condoms, and partnered with various non-governmental organizations (NGOs). The NAP formed the National Strategic Plan (2006–2010) to build on the successes of the previous five-year plan. It was designed to maintain the low prevalence of HIV/AIDS and improve health care services for those infected or affected by the disease. The plan's objectives included strengthening HIV/AIDS surveillance, expanding HIV/AIDS response, increasing awareness among the population, developing outreach and educational programs, growing the testing and counseling services, and improving the overall quality of life for people infected and affected by HIV.

=== Government actions and results ===
Since 2005, the Government of Egypt has become more actively involved in the fight against HIV/AIDS. The government established nine mobile VCCT (Voluntary Confidential Counseling and Testing) centers and 14 fixed centers around the country. With the help of Family Health International, it also conducted trainings for physicians and nurses on clinical management and nursing care, created self-care guides in Arabic and started to promote the use antiretroviral therapy. Additionally, the Ministry of Health has also been fighting the issue of lack of adherence to drug treatments by many HIV positive citizens. It started implementing case management programs that follow up with patients and provide psychological counseling and resources that will help the patients adhere to their specific treatments and deal with the stigma of the disease. These programs were established in numerous health centers that are associated with the Ministry of Health.

In 2006, Cairo was the site of a three-day, UNAIDS-supported workshop on HIV/AIDS and drug use in the region. The workshop included representatives of governments, non-governmental organizations (NGOs), and research programs from the Arab countries as well as from Afghanistan, Iran, and Pakistan. The Egyptian government worked with UNICEF to help prevent HIV/AIDS among youth and worked with the United Nations Office on Drugs and Crime to address HIV/AIDS among IDUs. Moreover, the Egyptian government, led by former First Lady Suzanne Mubarak, started a campaign to educate the public about HIV as a way to fight the spread of disease The government has worked to integrate HIV/AIDS into preparatory and secondary school curriculums.

=== Global Fund to Fight AIDS, Tuberculosis and Malaria ===
In March 2008, Egypt negotiated a six-round grant with the Global Fund to Fight AIDS, Tuberculosis and Malaria with the goal of "Reinforcing HIV/AIDS Prevention and Care Efforts in Egypt." The grant start date was April 1, 2008, and the end date was December 31, 2016. Throughout its duration, the project collected a cumulative amount of approximately $9 million. Some of the objectives of the project included: establishing a strong and supportive environment for the treatment and care of HIV, improving the current surveillance and monitoring data, preventing HIV transmission, including mother-to-child, reducing risk among the most impacted groups, and increasing access to treatment and other services for all people living with HIV in Egypt.

=== Military government treatment research ===
On February 22, 2014, a government-sponsored public service announcement aired on an official Egyptian T.V. channel where Major General Ibrahim Abdul Atti, the chief of the Egyptian Army Medical Team, announced the military's new medical devices, C-FAST and CCD for the treatment of AIDS. The announcer made ambitious claims about the devices that the Egyptian military scientists were working on. He proclaimed that the C-FAST was a breakthrough minimally invasive device that could detect and diagnose diseases, such as HIV, with electromagnetism. At the same time, the announcement stated that another device called CCD was currently being tested in trials but had high success rates of curing AIDS through blood purification. A short video accompanied the announcement showing the supposed devices at work. However, even though many major networks and media in Egypt ran with this news, there was no scientific basis to these claims made by the military scientists. In June 2014, the military personnel went back on their claims, stating that these devices needed additional testing because their original trials did not have large enough sample sizes. Now, further research is still being conducted by military medical personnel into the treatment of HIV and the widely spread hepatitis C virus.

== See also ==
- Asmaa
