= Afarit el-asphalt =

1996 Egyptian action thriller film

- Directed by: Oussama Fawzi
- Written by: Moustafa Zekri
- Produced by: Hany Gerges Fawzi
- Cinematography: Tarek El-Telmisany
- Edited by: Ahmad Metwalli
- Music by: Rajeh Dawood
- Distributed by: Aflam Guirguiss Fawzy
- Release date: 11 August 1996 (Switzerland)
- Running time: 120 min.
- Country: Egypt
- Language: Arabic

Afarit el-asphalt (The Asphalt Boogeymen) is a 1996 Egyptian action-thriller film directed by Oussama Fawzi and produced by Hany Gerges Fawzi for Aflam Guirguiss Fawzy. The film stars Mahmoud Hemida and Salwa Khattab in lead roles, whereas Hasan Husni, Lotfy Labib, Gamil Ratib and Mohammed Tawfik appear in supportive roles.

The film had its premier at Locarno Film Festival in Switzerland on 11 August 1996.

== Cast ==
- Mahmoud Hemida as Sayed
- Salwa Khattab
- Abdalla Mahmoud
- Gamil Ratib
- Hasan Husni as Hassan Hosny
- Aida Abdel Aziz as Tafeda
- Lotfy Labib as Saleh
- Mohammed Tawfik as Ali
- Manal Afifi as Bataa
- Amal Ibrahim as Zahia
- Mohamed Sharaf as Shaban
- Maged El-Kidwani as Halazona
- Shabaan Abdel Rehim as Singer
- Kamal Soleiman
- Alaa Awad
