= Brooks, Meadows and Lovely Faces =

2016 film

- Film poster
- Directed by: Yousry Nasrallah
- Written by: Yousry Nasrallah
- Starring: Menna Shalabi; Laila Eloui
- Release date: 7 August 2016 (Locarno)
- Running time: 115 minutes
- Country: Egypt
- Language: Arabic

Brooks, Meadows and Lovely Faces (Arabic: الماء والخضرة والوجه الحسن, translit. Al-Ma', Wal Khoudra, Walwagh El-Hassan.) is a 2016 Egyptian comedy film directed by Yousry Nasrallah. It was selected to be screened in the Contemporary World Cinema section at the 2016 Toronto International Film Festival.

== Cast ==
- Menna Shalabi
- Laila Eloui
- Bassem Samra
- Sabreen
- Mohamed El Sharnouby
