= Sorry to Disturb =

2008 Egyptian drama film

- Directed by: Khaled Marei
- Written by: Ayman Bahgat Kamar
- Produced by: Walid Sabri
- Starring: Ahmed Helmi; Mahmoud Hemida; Menna Shalabi; Dalal Abdel Aziz
- Cinematography: Ahmad Yusuf
- Music by: Amr Ismail
- Production company: United Brothers Cinema
- Distributed by: United Brothers Cinema
- Release date: 16 July 2008
- Running time: 116 minutes
- Country: Egypt
- Language: Egyptian Arabic
- Box office: E£22 million

Sorry to Disturb (Arabic: آسف على الإزعاج, romanized: ʾĀsif ʿalā al-ʾizʿāj) is a 2008 Egyptian comedy-drama film directed by Khaled Marei and written by Ayman Bahgat Kamar. It stars Ahmed Helmi, Mahmoud Hemida, Menna Shalabi, and Dalal Abdel Aziz.

The film was released in Egypt on 16 July 2008. It led the Egyptian summer box office with approximately E£22 million in revenue. It subsequently received Best Film at the Egyptian National Film Festival and won several awards at the Egyptian Catholic Center Cinema Festival.

== Plot ==
Hassan Salah El-Din Zeidan is an isolated aeronautical engineer living in Cairo with his mother, Nawal. He believes that others resent and persecute him because of his intelligence. Hassan has designed an aviation project intended to reduce fuel consumption and repeatedly writes to President Hosni Mubarak, seeking support and describing the hostility he believes he faces.

Hassan reports to the aviation workshop while officially on leave. After he dismantles equipment without authorization and ignores safety rules, his manager suspends him. Hassan hides the suspension from Nawal and instead turns to his father, Salah El-Din, a retired pilot who encourages his ambitions and advises him about his work. No one other than Hassan directly interacts with him.

Against Nawal's objections, Hassan withdraws a large sum of money and buys a motorcycle he has wanted since childhood. His conviction that people are targeting him intensifies: he receives abusive anonymous calls, sees insults written on his car, and accuses Medhat, a waiter at his regular café, of attacking him. He increasingly withdraws from his friend Louay.

Hassan meets Farida, a wedding planner who says she has been defrauded of 15,000 Egyptian pounds by a man named Emad El-Samanoudy. Wanting to impress her, Hassan pretends to telephone Emad and performs both sides of a conversation in which he appears to force the supposed con man to return the money.

Hassan and Farida begin meeting regularly. She encourages him to laugh, cry, and discuss his fears. However, she insists that they can meet only by chance and cannot contact one another normally. Meanwhile, Hassan receives a false call claiming that the president wishes to meet him. He goes to the presidential complex but is told that no appointment exists.

Concerned by his spending, suspension, and conversations with unseen people, Nawal brings a psychiatrist to their home while pretending that he is a prospective tenant. Hassan recognizes the deception and throws him out. During the ensuing argument, Nawal tells Hassan that his father died years earlier. Hassan turns to Salah El-Din and begs him to answer, but Nawal insists that no one is there.

The psychiatrist diagnoses Hassan with schizophrenia and explains that he created a benevolent hallucination of his father because he could not accept his death. Hassan initially resists the revelation, but his imagined relationship with Farida begins to collapse. After becoming jealous at a wedding, he visits the address where he believes she lives and finds a stranger there. Photographs he remembers taking with Farida show Hassan alone, while a laptop he believed he gave her remains unopened at home. He realizes that Farida was constructed from a real woman he had seen at the café but never approached.

Nawal persuades Hassan to accept treatment. Before disappearing, the hallucinated Salah El-Din recalls inspiring Hassan's childhood love of aviation and says goodbye. Hassan enters a psychiatric facility, receives medication and therapy, and eventually returns home. In his father's preserved study, he finds a chessboard arranged as though the game had been played from only one side.

A businessman offers to purchase Hassan's aviation project and develop it abroad, but Hassan wants it implemented in Egypt. He writes a final letter to the president, no longer claiming that he is persecuted. When he tries to post it, the broken mailbox opens and releases all of his previous letters, revealing that none were ever collected.

Hassan sells his motorcycle to help finance the project, and his manager supports his reinstatement. An engineering and administrative committee approves his return and the implementation of his invention.

Hassan reconciles with Louay, Medhat, and others whom he had treated as enemies. At the café, the real woman who inspired Farida approaches him. She introduces herself as Maryam and remembers that Hassan once drew her portrait. After he tells her what happened, they begin a relationship, marry, and have children.

At a later birthday celebration, Hassan sees both of his parents among the guests. A family photograph is taken, but neither parent appears in it. The final exchange features a voice identifying itself to Hassan as Hassan himself.

== Cast ==
- Ahmed Helmi as Hassan Salah El-Din Zeidan
- Mahmoud Hemida as Salah El-Din, Hassan's father
- Menna Shalabi as Farida / Maryam
- Dalal Abdel Aziz as Nawal, Hassan's mother
- Mohamed Sharaf as Naseem
- Tarek El-Telmissany as the owner of a foreign aviation company
- Sami Maghawry as the psychiatrist
- Ahmed Fouad Selim as Hassan's manager
- Wael Alaa as Medhat
- Youssef Eid as the flag seller
- Hany El-Sabbagh as the motorcycle salesman
- Amr Mamdouh as Louay

== Production ==
During pre-production, the screenplay was developed under the working title Daqiqa wa Nusf (Arabic: دقيقة ونصف, "A Minute and a Half"). An early version of the story centred on a university student preparing to read a farewell letter to his deceased father during a ninety-second silence, with memories of their relationship unfolding during that period. Screenwriter Ayman Bahgat Kamar described the intended style as comic suspense based on situational comedy rather than a succession of unrelated jokes.

The film was produced by Walid Sabri and United Brothers Cinema, which also distributed it. Psychiatrist Ahmed Okasha was credited as a psychiatric consultant.

== Music ==
The film's original score was composed by Amr Ismail.

Sherine Abdel Wahab performed "Fi al-Maraya" (في المرايا) for the film. The song was written by Ayman Bahgat Kamar and composed by Mohamed Yehia. Sherine recorded two arrangements: a slower version arranged by Ahmed Ibrahim for use within the film and a faster promotional version arranged by Tamim.

Film critic Tarek El-Shennawy praised the song's use during Hassan's treatment, describing it as emotionally suited to the character's loneliness and the dramatic context.

Songs used in the film include Eclipse by Pink Floyd, Hide In Your Shell by Supertramp, Don't Speak by No Doubt, and Sway.

== Release and reception ==
Three weeks after its release, Sorry to Disturb was screening in approximately 120 Egyptian cinemas and earning more than E£1 million per day. Al Jazeera reported that Egyptian critics and filmmakers had praised the novelty and boldness of its premise.

By September 2008, the film had earned approximately E£22 million and led the Egyptian summer box office, ahead of Hassan and Marcus.

El-Shennawy praised Ahmed Helmi for undertaking an unconventional tragic role during a season dominated by comedy. He described the film as a departure from a conventional collection of jokes, praised its narrative rhythm, and identified Mahmoud Hemida's performance as one of the actor's most notable roles.

== Accolades ==
At the fifteenth Egyptian National Film Festival, Sorry to Disturb received Best Film. Ahmed Helmi won Best Actor, while Khaled Marei received a special award.

At the fifty-seventh Egyptian Catholic Center Cinema Festival, the film won Best Film, Best Director for Marei, Best Screenplay for Ayman Bahgat Kamar, and Best Cinematography for Ahmed Youssef. Helmi received Best Actor, while Mahmoud Hemida received a special recognition award for his performance.

At the Egyptian Film Association Festival, the film received Best Film, Best Actor for Helmi, Best First-Time Director for Marei, Best Debut Cinematography for Youssef, and Best Sound for Mohamed Abdel-Hassib. Mohamed Sharaf also received Best Supporting Actor for his performances in both Sorry to Disturb and Cabaret.
