= Mohamed Farrag =

Egyptian actor (born 1982)

- محمد فراج
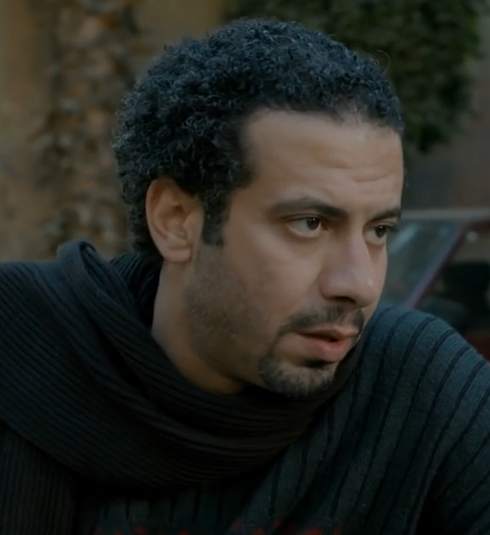
- Born: November 15, 1982 (age 43); Cairo, Egypt
- Occupation: Actor
- Spouse: Passant Shawky

Mohamed Farrag (born November 15, 1982) is an Egyptian actor.

== Career ==
Born in 1982, the Egyptian actor Farrag initially enrolled at the Higher Institute of Cinema but was forced to leave and later joined the Faculty of Commerce in Cairo. He subsequently attended Khaled Galal’s acting workshop at Cairo’s Creativity Center, where he performed in the troupe’s play Black Coffee in 2009, which achieved notable success. During the same period, he also worked in commercial advertising. He later took on supporting roles in various television series and films, including The Hostage and Congratulations, in which he appeared alongside Ahmed Helmy. In 2013, Farrag landed his first leading role in the action film El Ashash.

His performance in Wahid Hamed and Tamer Mohsen’s Bedon Zekr Asma’a further showcased his abilities, before he gained widespread recognition for his portrayal of Aly El Rouby in Tamer Mohsen’s Taht El Saytara. His subsequent collaboration with Mohsen on Haza El Masa’a further strengthened his reputation, while roles in Qabil, Aho Da Elly Sar, and El Mamar demonstrated his versatility. Farrag continued to make a strong impression in Ramadan 2021 with performances in Newton’s Cradle and Ded El Kasr, alongside appearances in El Ekhtyar 2 and Khaly Balak Men Zizi. In 2022, he starred in Room 207 and El A’edoon, followed by roles in Harb and Batn El Hoot. He later portrayed Hassan in Voy! Voy! Voy!, the Egyptian film selected as Egypt’s submission for the Academy Award for Best International Feature Film.

In 2025, Mohamed Farrag was cast in Catalog tv series, in which he plays Youssef, a father dealing with the death of his wife and struggling to emotionally support their two children.

In late 2025, Farrag was cast in the film *El Sett*, which tells the story of legendary Egyptian singer Umm Kulthum. In the film, he portrayed Ahmed Rami, a poet who was deeply and hopelessly in love with Umm Kulthum. Farrag was praised for his layered and emotionally powerful performance in the role.

== Selected work ==
=== Film ===
Year(s)	Title	Role	Notes	Ref.
2012	The Deal	—		
2013	El Ashash	—		
2023	Voy! Voy! Voy!	—		
2025	El Sett	Ahmed Rami		

=== Television ===
Year(s)	Title	Role	Notes	Ref.
2022	Room 207	—		
2025	Catalog	Youssef		
