= Asmaa =

- Directed by: Amr Salama
- Written by: Amr Salama
- Produced by: Mohamed Hefzy; Bushra Rozza
- Starring: Hend Sabry; Maged el-Kedwany; Hany Adel
- Cinematography: Ahmad Gabr
- Edited by: Amr Salah
- Production companies: Film Clinic; New Century
- Distributed by: Dollar Film (Egypt); Pacha Pictures (international)
- Release dates: 17 October 2011 (ADFF); 7 December 2011 (Egypt)
- Running time: 96 minutes
- Country: Egypt
- Language: Egyptian Arabic

Asmaa or Asma'a (Arabic: أسماء) is a 2011 Egyptian drama film, and is the first such feature film to present AIDS patients sympathetically. Written and directed by Amr Salama, the film tells the history of a woman with HIV who struggles to live under the burden of keeping her HIV status secret, and the dilemma she faces when offered the opportunity to appear on a television talk show.

The film is based on a true story of a woman who died from a burst gallbladder after doctors refused to operate on her because she had AIDS. The director, Amr Salama, intended the film to raise awareness about AIDS: in his words, to correct the "misconceptions and lies" about the disease, since more people are dying from the misconceptions than from the lack of treatment. The film is not about AIDS, but rather the battle against social prejudice in Egypt.

== Background ==
In the late 1980s and early 1990s, very frightening TV adverts about AIDS were broadcast in Egypt, including images of bats, blood, evil satanic prostitutes and intravenous drug use. Early films about AIDS tended to display total ignorance about the facts of the disease, and to play on fear; one such film was based on HIV being transferred by infected female Mossad agents in Taba. Wessam el-Beih, the UNAIDS Country Coordinator for Egypt, said, "Egyptian media, especially the film industry has for years propagated misinformation and portrayed biased views about people living with HIV."

In December 2011, Index on Censorship reported that "Low self esteem and fear of rejection are common sentiments shared by Egyptians living with HIV. Out of an estimated 11,000 people in Egypt living with HIV and AIDS, only 500 are seeking treatment, according to UN reports. And none has publicly disclosed their status." The strong stigma associated with AIDS prevents access to the necessary care and treatment. According to the Egyptian Initiative for Personal Rights (EIPR), medical professionals are reluctant to treat the condition, because they do not have the necessary knowledge of infection control, and because of the moral stigma of illicit relationships. AIDS patients are unable to discuss their case openly, and may also suffer discrimination in housing and employment.

AIDS patients are less likely to receive the normal sympathy that sufferers of other diseases receive, and may even be regarded as sinners. Amr Salama said:

For example, in Egypt we think it's a punishment from God and we should not treat it. We think that they get it from a sin so they deserve it, and we think it's very contagious so we don't deal with them in any way. So people die from that more than they die from anything else.

Asmaa is based on true stories of AIDS sufferers whom Salama met while working on a documentary that he made about AIDS for the United Nations in 2005.

== Plot ==
Asmaa (Hend Sabry) is a woman in her 40s living with her aging father Hosni (Sayed Ragab) and teenage daughter Habiba (Fatma Adel) in Cairo, and struggling to support them with her meagre earnings from a menial job at Cairo International Airport. She is HIV-positive and requires surgery on her gallbladder, without which she will die. Doctors refuse her surgery when, on the point of entering the operating theatre, she reveals that she has AIDS.

In a series of flashbacks, the film gradually reveals Asmaa's earlier life in the Egyptian countryside. As an independent, strong-willed, young woman helping her father sell rugs at the village market, she meets, falls in love with and marries Mosaad (Hany Adel), an army conscript serving in the Central Security Forces. Mosaad inadvertently kills another man in a brawl when he comes to his wife's support in a dispute over her stall at the local market. He is sent to prison for the killing, but the sentence is relatively short to take account of the circumstances. After his release, he refuses to have sex with Asmaa, but does not tell her why, namely that he has contracted AIDS in prison. Eventually his secret comes out, but Asmaa is still willing to fulfill Mossad's wish for a son. After Mosaad's death, while Asmaa is pregnant, she agrees that if she gives birth to a son, she will leave him with Mosaad's family, so that the family will have an heir for their land, but that if she gives birth to a daughter, she will leave and take the daughter with her.

The flashbacks contrast with the more subdued life of Asmaa in Cairo, where Asmaa joins an HIV/AIDS support group. The group is approached by self-promoting talk show host Mohsen el-Seesy (Maged el-Kedwany) who tries to persuade Asmaa to appear on his show and to reveal her true identity, arguing that this will enable her to have the operation that will save her life. Asmaa has been living for years with HIV, but only her father knows of her HIV status, and she is terrified to reveal it publicly, especially to her daughter Habiba. Asmaa has been having difficulties at work for a long time. Her employer insists on seeing her medical records, but Asmaa keeps making excuses. Assured that she cannot be legally fired for having AIDS, she finally produces the medical records. Instead of firing her, her employer asks her fellow workers whether they want to continue working with Asmaa, receiving a reluctant but overwhelming negative answer, so Asmaa effectively loses her job without being fired.

A charitable foundation offers to treat Asmaa if she will say how she caught the disease, but Asmaa refuses. Asmaa is adamant that she will not reveal how she came to be infected by HIV, saying that everyone has a right to be treated. After a long struggle with her dilemma, Asmaa agrees to appear on Mohsen's television show anonymously, but Mohsen succeeds in persuading Asmaa to reveal her identity, leading to an emotional climax for the film.

== Reception ==
In the Egyptian English-language women's magazine, What Women Want, May Abdel Asim praised the film as "authentic and sincere" and "a true story of a strong and proud woman who has Aids but Aids does not have her". Other Egyptian reviewers were not so favourable: Hani Mustafa, in al-Ahram Weekly, disliked the "preaching and moralising" he found in the film, calling it "little more than slick propaganda that may work well as part of a civil society AIDS campaign."

Stephen Farber, for The Hollywood Reporter, called the film "one of the strongest movies" among those from the Arab world shown at the 2012 Palm Springs International Film Festival, and "indeed one of the best in the entire festival".

== Awards ==
The film premièred at the 2011 Abu Dhabi Film Festival, where it won the New Horizons awards for Best Director from the Arab World (Amr Salama) and Best Actor (Maged el-Kedwany). At the 2012 Fribourg International Film Festival, Asmaa won the audience award.

== Cast ==
- Hend Sabry as Asmaa
- Maged el-Kedwany as Mohsen
- Hany Adel as Mosaad
- Fatma Adel as Habiba
- Sayed Ragab as Hosni
- Laila Ezz El Arab as Farida
- Botros Ghali as the psychiatrist

== See also ==
- Media portrayal of HIV/AIDS
- HIV/AIDS in Egypt
- List of Egyptian films of the 2010s
