= New Century Production =

African film production company

- Industry: Film
- Founded: 2004
- Founder: Walid Al Kurdi
- Headquarters: Egypt

New Century Production (Arabic: نيوسينشري للانتاج الفني) is an Egyptian film production company established by Walid Al Kurdi in 2004 as a new production branch of Dollar Film, itself first founded in 1949.

== Filmography ==
Year	Original title	Romanized title	English title	Director
2005	الاحساء السبع	El hasa el sabaa	The Seventh Sense	Ahmed Mekky
2007	احلام حقيقيه	Ahlam hakekya	Real Dreams	Mohamed Gomaa
2010	—N/a	678	Cairo 6, 7, 8	Mohamed Diab
2011	امن دولت	Amn Dawlat	—N/a	Akram Farid
2011	أسماء	Asmaa	—N/a	Amr Salama
2011	بيبو وبشير	Bebo Wa Bashir	Bibo and Beshir	Mariam Abou Ouf
2011	سامي أوكسيد الكربون	Samy Oxed El Karbon	—N/a	Akram Farid
2011	يوك	Euc	—N/a	Akram Farid
2012	مصور قتيل	Mesawar Qateel	Snapshot	Kareem El-Adl
2012	30 فبراير	—N/a	February 30th	Moataz El Tony
2012	بابا	Baba	Papa	Akram Farid
2012	مستر أند مسز عويس	—N/a	Mr and Mrs Oweis	Akram Farid
2012	بعد الموقعة	Baad el Mawkeaa	After the Battle	Yousry Nasrallah
2012	جدو حبيبي	Geddo Habibi	—N/a	Ali Idris
2012	علاء جوتي	Ala Gothety	On My Dead Body	Muhammad Bakir
2013	القشاش	El Ashash	—N/a	Ismail Farouk
2013	نظرية عمتى	—N/a	My Aunt's Theory	Akram Farid
2014	ديكور	Dikur	Decor	Ahmad Abdalla
2014	عنتر وبيسه	Antar w Beesa	Antar & Beesa	Mohamed El-Tahawy
2014	صنع في مصر	Sone'a Fee Misr	Made in Egypt: Soneia Fe Misr	Amr Salama
