= Molasses (film) =

- Film poster
- Arabic: عسل إسود
- Directed by: Khalid Mar'iee
- Written by: Khalid Diab
- Produced by: Brothers United for Cinema
- Starring: Ahmed Helmy; Edward; Lotfy Labib
- Cinematography: Brothers United for Cinema
- Music by: Omar Khairat
- Production company: Brothers United for Cinema
- Distributed by: Rotana Studios
- Release date: May 25, 2010
- Country: Egypt
- Language: Arabic
- Budget: £E15.6 Million

Molasses (Arabic: عسل إسود, romanized: Assal Eswed, also released as Bittersweet) is a 2010 Egyptian black comedy film. The literal translation of the title is "Black Honey", relating to the bitter-sweet feelings that Egyptians feel towards living in their country.

It is about a 30 year old Egyptian American named Masry (the word "Masry" means "Egyptian" in Arabic) who desires to get back in touch with his roots and to revive his nostalgic memories of how Egypt used to be. However, he quickly becomes disenchanted upon experiencing first hand the chaos that Egypt has descended into.

== Plot ==
Masry Sayed El-Araby (lit. Egyptian Sir The Arab) is an Egyptian American photographer who returns to Egypt after twenty years abroad, having left when he and his family immigrated to America. Although he became a naturalized US citizen during his time abroad, he is returning with only his Egyptian passport.

Upon arrival, he is treated with increased scrutiny by immigration officers, outrageously overcharged by a taxi driver, and refused service by the hotel which he had previously booked as they were expecting an American passport. He is even arrested for photographing a public place. He has to call the taxi driver to bail him out, leading him to be scammed by him yet again.

He subsequently learns that Egyptian citizens have very few rights and that they live a very tough life where foreigners are often treated with more respect than Egyptians themselves.

In response, Masry has his United States passport express mailed to his hotel room, and in a fit of rage, decides to throw the Egyptian passport out the window. He returns to the same drivers, chauffeurs and policemen who had previously scammed or mistreated him, and their behavior instantly changes when they all see the passport.

However, he comes across a crowd protesting the US war on terror. When he identifies himself as a US citizen, the crowd beats him up and he loses his passport, cameras and wallet. This leaves him stranded in the country until he can get all of his documents back. Additionally, the US Embassy in Cairo kicks him out as he cannot prove his identity and does not own valuable property.

He then decides to go back to his father's old apartment and live there.

Masry is reunited with his neighbour and childhood friend Said and his family, where he helps him by fixing up his father's old apartment and inviting him to live with him and his family while it gets repaired. Also, he obtains a taste of the bureaucratic systems involved in obtaining documentation - where his papers are rejected numerous times for trivial reasons. He resorts to bribery in order for them to register him.

Living with Said, Masry experiences the delights of the Egyptian culture that has been a part of him that has been lacking in his life since he left Egypt in his youth.

Masry experiences the typical activities that Egyptians endure to get his life in order and to get his American passport back so he can back to the United States. There is a substantial cultural difference which means he often gets into heated discussions with some of his family members.

After he hears one of the children say he is "sikis" years old he takes a crowded bus to his school where he meets his English teacher, Mervat; they also get into an argument over the correct pronunciation. His cousin, who has a crush on her, helps him out of the situation and they get back to forging the documents.

One night, he flies into a rage about his personal situation but also noting that many people in the family are currently experiencing employment or life problems - and that this should lead to anger about the country. However, his family rebuffs him, stating that they are able to overcome their difficulties thanks to their supportive community, their faith in Allah, and perseverance.

The family goes to a picnic on the banks of the Nile, and Masry gets sick when he drinks unfiltered water from it, said to be a test to find true Egyptians.

To his surprise, he is contacted by the Egyptian National Police stating that someone had dropped off a bag with his identity and his cameras. Masry says goodbye to all of the companions he had met during his stay in Egypt, donating his cameras to his relatives and boarding a plane to leave. During the take-off, he realizes that his stay has changed him. He fakes illness in order for the plane to make an emergency landing, only for the pilot to reject this as he is assumed to be an Egyptian citizen. When the flight attendant sees his American passport, they rapidly change their mind.

== Cast ==
- Ahmed Helmy as Masry Sayed El-Araby
- Edward as Said
- Lotfy Labib as Radi
- Enaam Salousa as Saeed's Mother
- Ahmed Rateb as Officer
- Amy Samir Ghanem as Mervat
- Dina Talaat

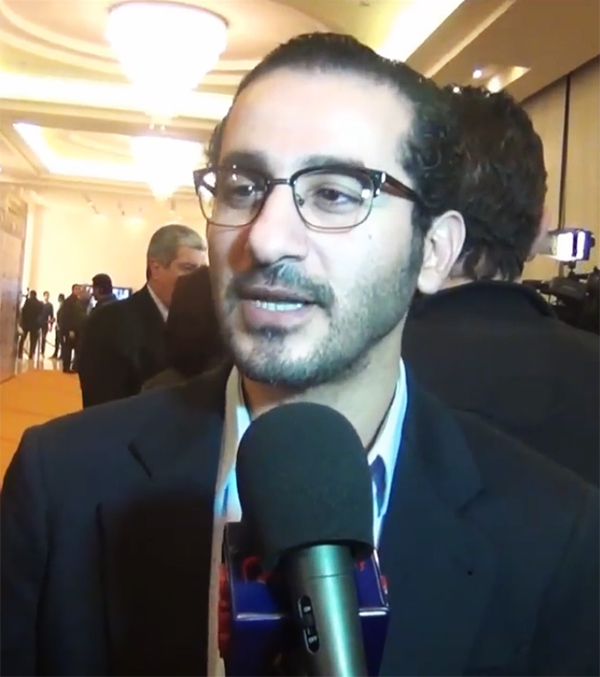
Helmy in 2014

== Reception ==
Overall reception has been positive, with critics praising the depiction of Cairo and its residents from the point of view of an Egyptian living outside of Egypt. Some critics have less favourable reviews, citing that Assal Eswed clings to the nationalistic tendencies of Egyptians in order to develop a relatable character to average Egyptians.
