= El Ashash =

El Aashash
- Film poster
- Arabic: القشاش
- Directed by: Ismael Farouk
- Written by: Mohamed Samir Mabrouk
- Produced by: Walid Al Kurdi
- Starring: Horeya Farghaly; Mohamed Farrag
- Music by: El Esaba Band
- Production company: New Century Production
- Distributed by: Arabia Cinema Distribution
- Release date: October 12, 2013 (Egypt)
- Running time: 90 minutes
- Country: Egypt
- Language: Arabic

El Ashash (Arabic: القشاش) is a 2013 Egyptian drama film written by Mohamed Samir Mabrouk, produced by Walid Al Kurdi, and directed by Ismael Farouk. The film stars Mohamed Farrag and Horeya Farghaly.

== Plot ==
A little boy (Mohamed Farag) gets lost and is being raised by a worker in an orphanage. Growing up, his life is otherwise normal until he is accused of killing someone. He decides to run away and prove his innocence. He meets a Shaabi belly dancer (Horeya Farghaly) who helps him to escape.

== Cast ==
- Mohamed Farrag
- Horeya Farghaly
- Dalal Abdel Aziz
- Marwa Adbelmenem
- Soleiman Eid
- Ihab Fahmi
- Hassan Hosny
- Heba Magdy
- Hanan Metaweh
- Alaa Morsy
- Hanan Youssef
