= Qarmat Bitamrmat =

- Release dates: 2019
- Country: Egypt
- Language: Arabic

Qarmat Beit Qarmat (Arabic: قرمط بيت قرمط, lit. English: Qarmouti's House of Qarmatians) is a 2019 Egyptian comedy film, starring Ahmed Adam, Mai Selim, Dina Fouad, and Walid Fawaz. The film revolves around Al-Qarmouti, a descendant of the Qarmatians who builds a cemetery for his ancestors and turns it into a tourist attraction, while getting involved in a murder case related to antiquities smuggling.

== Plot ==
Al-Qarmouti (Ahmed Adam) is a man who honors his ancestors by building a cemetery for them on his land, and makes it a tourist attraction by charging a ticket for admission. He hires two tour guides to tell fabricated stories about the Qarmatians and their achievements. However, this causes him problems with the Ministry of Tourism and Antiquities, which accuses him of violating the law and exploiting the heritage. A police colonel and an officer are sent to investigate and shut down his cemetery.

Meanwhile, a journalist named Ghada Al-Ghunaimi (Mai Selim) is filming a murder of a gang working in smuggling antiquities, and accidentally leaves her camera at the crime scene. The camera contains valuable evidence that could expose the gang and their leader, Di Faso, a notorious smuggler who poses as a French archaeologist. The camera ends up in the hands of Al-Qarmouti, who finds it in a sarcophagus that he bought from the gang. He gets involved with the journalist and tries to help her expose the gang and clear his name. However, the gang leader and his henchmen chase them and try to retrieve the camera and the evidence.

== Release ==
The film was released on January 16, 2019, in Egypt.
