= Cairo Drive =

- Directed by: Sherief Elkatsha
- Written by: Sherief Elkatsha
- Produced by: Sherief Elkatsha; Mona Eldaief; Ayman Samir Ezzat; Pierre Haberer; Laila Muhareb; Samer Zureikat
- Starring: Ayman Samir; Karina Shalaby; George Azmy; Jehane Abou Youssef; Amira Ghazalla; Iman Ezzat
- Edited by: Sherief Elkatsha; Pierre Haberer
- Music by: Mohamed Ghorab; Ahmed Azzam; Sabrine El Hossamy
- Production companies: Katsha Films; Nimbus Film; Danish Documentary Productions
- Release date: 28 October 2013 (2013 Abu Dhabi Film Festival)
- Running time: 79 minutes
- Country: Egypt
- Languages: Arabic; English

Cairo Drive is a 2014 Egyptian documentary film by Sherief Elkatsha. The film explores Cairo's chaotic traffic and illustrates the ways in which individuals navigate its hectic roads, unspoken rules, and 14 million vehicles. The film was shot over three years, from 2009 to 2012, and depicts scenes from before, during, and after the 2011 revolution. The film debuted on 27 October 2013 at the Abu Dhabi Film Festival and received the Best Film From the Arab World - Documentary Competition award. It is Elkatsha's fourth feature film and his first to appear in an international film festival.

== Synopsis ==
The film begins in 2009 and opens with aerial shots of Cairo's geometrical gridlock, while Handel's Water Music plays seamlessly in the background. The serenity is quickly broken, however, by a series of ground-level shots of bumper to bumper traffic, shouting taxi drivers, and an endless symphony of car horns. Amidst this mélange of 14 million vehicles, it appears that not even the traffic police understand how it all works. Yet through a series of comical behind the wheel interviews, it becomes clear that the array of sounds and gestures represents an ongoing dialogue between the city's 20 million residents. However, the film also touches upon the city's darker side. Corruption is rampant and despite residents' crafty work-arounds, the situation is without question out of control and getting worse. One resident describes crossing Cairo's streets, many of which have eight or more "lanes", as a giant game of Frogger. A more poignant moment comes when a long-time American resident of Cairo recounts how his daughter, 18, was struck and killed by a bus.

Midway through the film, revolution breaks out. The unbridled optimism of the January 25 Revolution is evident in drivers' interactions, some of whom volunteer as "traffic helpers" in Tahrir Square. Whereas traffic police were a baffling and ineffective before, they disappear altogether in the wake of the protests. Yet as the excitement subsides, the humdrum of everyday life returns along with the same, age-old problems. The film ends in 2012 on the eve of the country's first presidential election post-revolution, with the future as uncertain as ever.

== Production ==
Elkatsha wrote and directed the majority of the film himself, but also raised $33,000 though through the crowd-funding platform Indiegogo, which allowed him to hire Pierre Haberer as an editor.

== Reception ==
The film was released to critical acclaim. Mark Adams of Screen Daily calls the film "an enthralling, insightful and often rather funny look at the vibrant, complex and dramatic city of Cairo" while Mark Adams of The Oregonian claims, "In Elkatsha's editing bay, the frustrations of traffic become a potent metaphor for a nation's much-larger frustrations."

== Accolades ==
- "Best Film from the Arab World - Documentary Competition" - Abu Dhabi Film Festival 2013
- DOC NYC - Grand Jury Prize
- "Special Mention" - Open City Docs - London
