= After the Battle (film) =

2012 film directed by Yousry Nasrallah

- Directed by: Yousry Nasrallah
- Written by: Omar Shama
- Produced by: Georges-Marc Benamou
- Starring: Menna Shalabi; Nahed El Sebaï
- Cinematography: Samir Bahzan
- Edited by: Ziyad Hawwas; Mona Rabei
- Music by: Tamer Karawan
- Production companies: France 3 Cinéma; Studio 37; New Century Production; Siècle Productions
- Distributed by: MK2 Diffusion (France)
- Release dates: 17 May 2012 (Cannes); 12 September 2012 (Toronto); 26 September 2012 (Egypt)
- Running time: 124 minutes
- Countries: Egypt; France
- Language: Arabic

After the Battle (Arabic: بعد الموقعة, romanized: Baad el Mawkeaa) is a 2012 Egyptian-French drama film written by Omar Shama and directed by Yousry Nasrallah. The film competed for the Palme d'Or at the 2012 Cannes Film Festival.

== Plot ==
The film takes place in Egypt during the January revolution.

== Cast ==
- Menna Shalabi as Reem
- Nahed El Sebaï as Fatma
- Bassem Samra as Mahmoud
- Salah Abdallah as Haj Abdallah
- Phaedra as Dina
- Abdallah Medhat as Abdallah
- Momen Medhat as Momen
- Ahmed Kotb as David
- Ahmed Salama
- Abdelrahman Yasser as Basel
