= Al Motazawegoon =

The Married Couples
- Directed by: Hassan Abd Al-Salam
- Written by: Faisal Nada
- Starring: Samir Ghanem, George Sydhom, Sherin, Zakareya Mowafi, Najah Al- Mogi
- Music by: Performed live by a backstage orchestra ensemble
- Distributed by: The play is an expired copyrighted work
- Release date: 1978
- Running time: 195 minutes
- Country: Egypt
- Language: Arabic Egyptian dialect

Al Motazawegoon (المتزوجون, "The Married Couples") is an Egyptian play, conceived, produced and performed in the various theaters of Egypt. The cast included several yesteryear Egyptian theater icons such as Samir Ghanem and Sherin. The play received great adulation and praise from critics and audiences alike. It provided great relief to Egyptian audiences plagued by economic collapse and poverty. Fast forward to more than 30 years after its inception and performance, Al Motazawagezoon has gone on to become a cult comedy theatrical classic, and it has managed to attract and impact thousands of Arabs for its realistic portrayals of marital issues, class differentiation and the attitudes of Egyptian men and women of that particular time. The play was performed in the year 1978 and was credited with resurrecting Egyptian comedy theatre in an age of decline for both Egyptian theatre and film.

== Plot ==
The play mainly discusses and addresses the issues of matrimony and the class divide in Egyptian society in a comic light. Set against the background of a crumpling Egyptian economy, it highlights the disparities between the wealthy and poor strata of Egyptian society and the differences between the attitudes of men and women in regards to matrimonial issues. It is the story of two married couples from different socio-economic backgrounds. Masoud (Samir Ghanem) and Hanafi (George Sudhom) are lifelong friends living in extreme poverty and economic deprivation. Through coincidence and sheer luck, Masoud meets a girl hailing from a wealthy family and background (Shireen) who is fascinated and amazed by his simple, unfussy and uncomplicated lifestyle. They marry, with Masoud hoping to escape his old and tough life behind and migrate to his father-in-law's majestic palace whereas Masoud’s wife wants experience the simple reality of most Egyptian people and wishes to leave her superficial and comfortable life. The contrast in background and attitude provides for one of the funniest yet realistic portrayals of the 1970s Egyptian society and has gone on to make the play a benchmark for other comic productions.

== Reception ==
All critics unanimously commended the play for its pragmatic portrayal of Egyptian society and its relevance to current societal issues. Critics also praised the excellent acting prowess of the lead cast and their outstanding comic timing. However, critics disproved of the weak dialogue, the use of constant improvisation by the lead cast and the slow pace of the production.

Although exact audience attendance figures are not available, each show has been claimed to receive a phenomenal response from audiences in terms of attendance and interaction. Today, different clips of the play across YouTube have amassed views of around 96,000 to 151,700, proving the play's timeless appeal.

== Distribution ==
The work has been distributed via DVD and also as part of in-flight entertainment programmes of various Arab airlines.
