= Mahmoud Hemida =

Egyptian actor

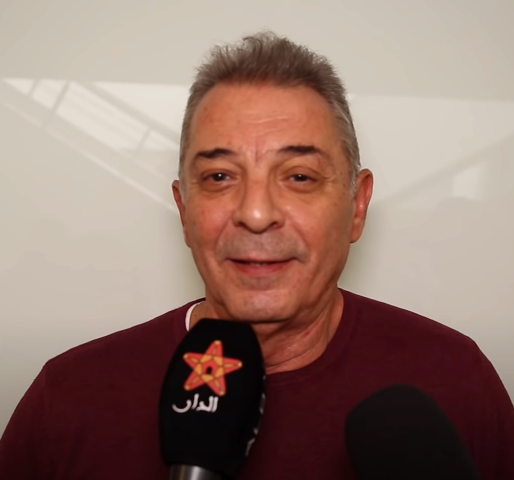
- Born: محمود حميدة; 7 December 1953 (age 72); Cairo, Egypt
- Occupation: Actor
- Years active: 1986–present

Mahmoud Hemida (Arabic: محمود حميدة; born 7 December 1953, in Cairo) is an Egyptian actor and producer.

== Career ==
Mahmoud's acting career began with performances on television in 1986, he received his first starring role in a TV series by the director Ahmed Khadr, where his performance had been impressed by those working and interested in the film industry in Egypt. Then he participated in the series (Harat Al Shurafa) and (Al Wassiyah) and (Abyad W Eswed) alongside Salah Zulfikar in 1989, his performance in that last series drew a lot of praise and acclaim for his talents and marked the beginning of his rise as a star.

The start of Mahmoud's cinematic career began with his performing a leading role alongside Ahmed Zaki in the film (Al Embrator) in 1990. Mahmoud has also founded a production company that has released several films including "Janat Al Shayytan".

Mahmoud founded an (entertainment) magazine titled "Al Fann Al Sabeaa" which was the first Arabic, cinematic, printed magazine to be specialized in the Cinema industry in the Middle East.

In 1996, he founded a production company Albatrik, for Artistic productions and cinematic services which produced some of under its own banner, and some of them as the executive producer for other companies. Their most successful movie under their banner was "Janet El Shyateen", which appreciated by the Critics. In the same year, he established "El-Momthel" Studio with the help of professionals for training and supporting the new talents

== Filmography ==
=== Films ===
2021	Al Aref	Mourad
2020	The Washing Machine	Omar – 60
2018	Harb Karmouz	
2018	Ward Masmum	
2018	Sery Lelghaya	
2017	Youm Min el Ayam	Jaber
2017	Photocopy	
2017	El saher karwan	Ward Masmoum
2016	Yom Lel Seta	Ahmed
2015	Men Dahr Ragel	Adham
2015	Regata	Sari
2015	Ot W Far	Abbas El-Ot (Wazir el Dakhlia)
2015	Nawara	Osama
2015	Ahwak	Hamza
2009	Ehky Ya Shahrzad	Adham
2009	Youm Ma Etablnan	Yusuf
2009	Dokan Shehata	Hagag
2009	Laylat El Baby Doll	El-Lwaa Mohsen
2008	Asef 3Al Ez3Ag	Saladin
2006	Malek W Kitaba	Dr. Mahmoud
2004	Alexandria – New York	Yehia
2004	Baheb El Cima	Adly
2000	Al-Abwab Al-Moghlaka	Mansour
1999	Al-Akhar	
1999	Amn Dawlat	Kamal
1999	Janet.El.Shyateen	Tabl / Munir Rasmy
1998	Dantella	Hossam
1997	Al-Masir	El Khalifa
1996	Eghtial	
1996	Afarit el-asphalt	Sayed
1995	Abu Zeid Zamano	Abu Zeid
1995	Qalil Min Alhob Kathir Min Aloanf	
1995	El Ragol El Thalth	Rustem
1995	Imra'A Hazat Aarsh Mesr	Mustafa Abdel Hamid
1994	Harb El Farawla	Dove Fadel Al-Suhaji
1994	Souq El Nssa	Ahmed (Investigation Officer)
1994	Kart Ahmar	Dr. Mohsen
1994	Al Mohager	Minahar
1993	Youm Har Gdn	Diaa
1993	El Basha	Yusuf (Joe)
1993	Bawabat Iblis	Na'naah
1993	Enthar Bel-Ta3A	Ibrahim
1993	Al-Thaaleb	Kamal
1993	Disco Disco	Essam
1993	Fursan Akher Zaman	Magdy Hassanein
1993	Al-Ghaarkana	Saad
1993	El L3B M3A El Ashrar	Farhan hazeen (Farfour)
1993	Fares El-Madina	Fares
1993	Maganino	Dr. Adam
1993	Al Zeab	Taher
1992	Raghba Motawahesha	Sayed Ghazal
1992	Emraa Ayla Lelsokot	Shukri Abdul Aziz (Journalist)
1992	Al-Shariss	Hammam
1992	Samara El-Amir	Ali Galal
1991	Beware Of This Woman	Abbas
1991	Assr El Qowa	Morsi Nofal
1991	Al Feraa 12	
1991	Kaid Al Awalem	Hosni
1991	Al Masateel	Samir
1990	Al Imbrator	Abraham
1990	Sayedat Al-Qahira	
1986	Al Awbash	

== TV serials ==
- The GodFather: 2017 – Zain Al Attar
- Inheritance of the Wind: 2013 – Ibrahim Tayeb
- Song on the Bridge Of Hope
- Medal: 1990 – Khawaja Taki
- Black and white: 1989
- Five m Five m: 1987
- Al-Shorafa Lane: 1986
- Al – Azhar Al – Sharif Lighthouse of Islam: 1982 – Bilal
- Ahmed bin Majid: 1980 – his first role
- But love: Dr Alaa Tambouli
- Man and train
- Exit the circle

== Awards ==
Year	Festival	Award	Film
1994	Annual Film Festival	Tournament	The Pasha
1995	Egyptian Cinema Art Association	Best actor	The third man
1996	National Film Festival of Egypt	The acting	Asphalt puck
1999	Cairo International Film Festival	Production	Devils' paradise
1999	Alexandria International Film Festival	Best Movie	Devils' paradise
2000	The 6th National Film Festival of Egypt	Production and representation	Devils' paradise
2003	Tetouan International Festival	Best actor	Devils' paradise
2005	Film Art Association "Egyptian Academy Awards"	Best actor	Alexandria – New York
2005	The 11th National Festival of Egyptian Cinema	Best actor	I love movies
2006	Muscat International Festival	Best actor	King and writing
2006	The 12th National Film Festival of Egypt	Best actor	King and writing
2007	Catholic Center Festival in Cairo	Best actor	King and writing
2018	Kazan International Muslim Film Festival	Best actor	Photocopy
