= Samir Ghanem =

Egyptian comedian, singer, and entertainer (1937–2021)

- سمير غانم
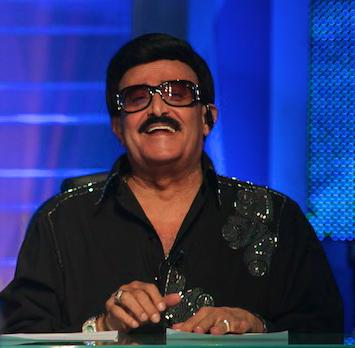
- Ghanem in 2010
- Born: Samir Yousef Ghanem; 15 January 1937; Al-ʿAtawlah, Asyut, Kingdom of Egypt
- Died: 20 May 2021 (aged 84); Mohandiseen, Giza, Egypt
- Education: University of Alexandria
- Occupation: Actor
- Years active: 1963–2021
- Spouse: Dalal Abdel Aziz (m. 1984; died 2021)
- Children: Donia; Amy

Samir Youssef Ghanem (Arabic: سمير يوسف غانم; 15 January 1937 – 20 May 2021) was an Egyptian actor, known primarily for his comedy roles. He is considered an icon who had a six decade career in theatre and cinema.

== Early life and education ==
Ghanem was born in al-ʿAtawlah, Asyut Governorate. After graduating from high school, he joined the Police Academy following the example of his father, who was a police officer, but he was dismissed from it after failing two consecutive years, so he transferred papers to the College of Agriculture at Alexandria University and joined the acting teams there. He earned a bachelor's degree in Agriculture from Alexandria University. During the period of his studies in the police academy, Samir Ghanem narrates that he lived through the period of the presence of the famous actor Salah Zulfikar, who was a professor at the academy at the time. Ghanem stated that Zulfikar was a captain and was just promoted to the rank of major, and that Zulfikar was his idol and he had a great deal of respect for him.

== Career ==
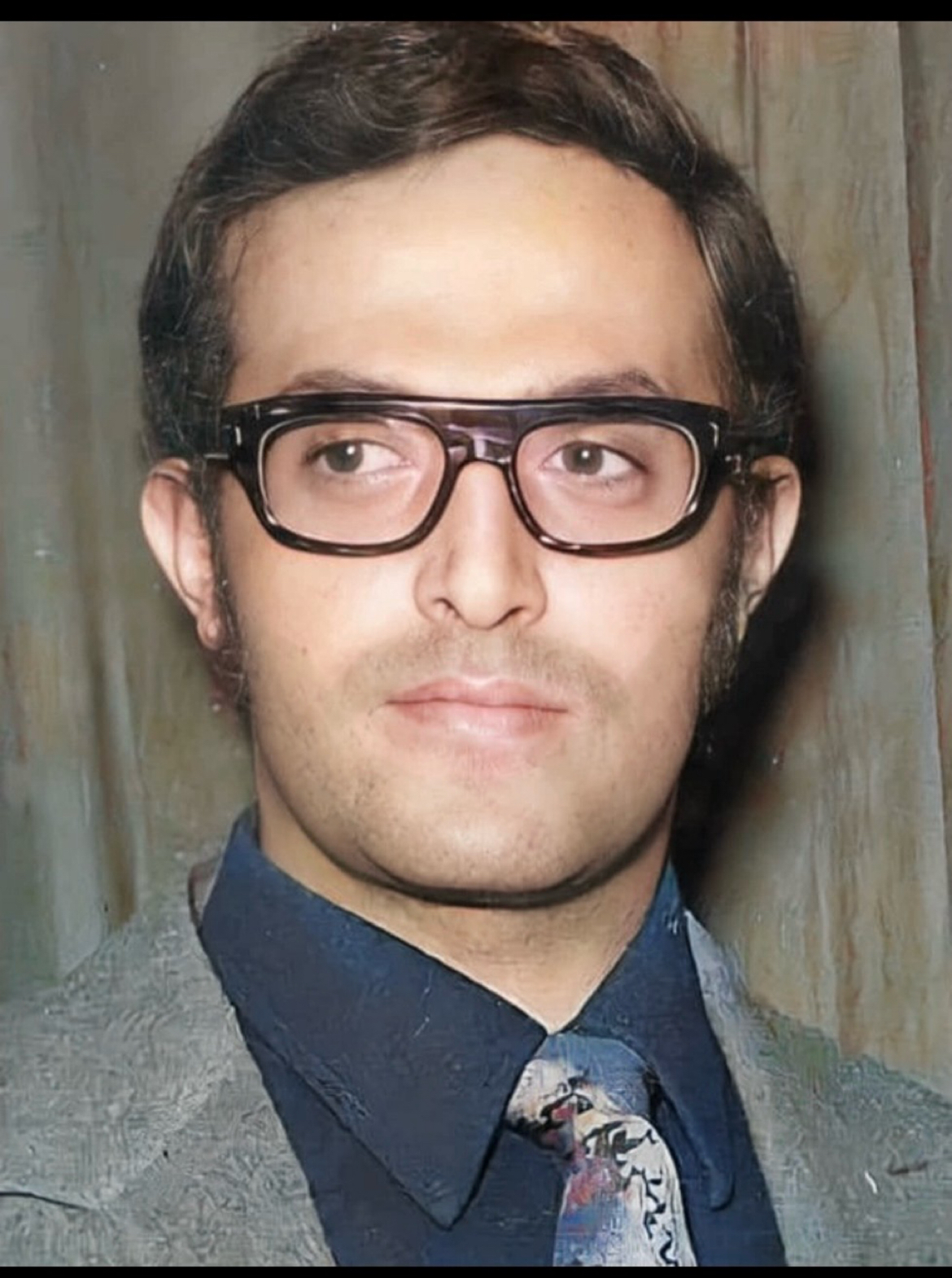
Samir Ghanem in 1972

In Alexandria, Ghanem met artists Waheed Seif and Adel Nassif and formed a group that performed sketches on stages in Alexandria. George Sidhom was also gaining recognition at Ain Shams University, while El Deif Ahmed was becoming known at Cairo University. Ghanem eventually joined them, and the three established the famous “Trio of Stage Lights” (Tholathy Adwa’a El Masrah). The group went on to perform in numerous films and plays, as well as comedic sketches known for their fast-paced performances and light melodies. Their first show, “Doctor Save Me”, was a short performance that marked their entry into the entertainment industry.

The trio eventually separated after El Deif Ahmed died in 1970. Ghanem and Sidhom continued working under the name “Trio of Stage Lights” until the 1980s, although their later success was more limited. Together, they produced works such as ‘’Al-Mutazawwigun’’ in 1978.

Ghanem achieved further recognition through “Fawazir Ramadan” (Ramadan Trivia Shows), where he introduced his famous character Fatouta. Another notable television performance was his role in “Hekayat Captain Mizo” (The Tales of Captain Mizo). He became regarded as one of the Middle East’s prominent comedic actors, particularly known for his spontaneity and creativity.

Throughout his career, Ghanem appeared in numerous films, including “The Two Friends”, “We Are Not Angels”, “One in a Million”, “The Mirage”, “The Three Crazies”, “We Are Good Men”, “The Fire of Longing”, “The Fun Band”, and “Boy and Girl and the Devil.”

In 1964, he appeared in several plays, including “Tabikh Al-Malaika”, “You Who Killed Elio”, “Music in the Eastern Quarter”, and “Forbidden Zone”.

During the late 1970s and early 1980s, Ghanem and George Sidhom performed two of the most significant plays of their collaboration, “Married Couple” (Al Motazawegoon) in 1978 and “Welcome Doctor” in 1981.

Although Ghanem did not become a major cinema star until the 1980s, Ghanem had already achieved huge success on stage through his work with the Trio of Stage Lights and his various theatrical performances.

His notable theatrical productions in the new millennium included “Do Re me Fasoulia” in 2001, “Khulousi, a bodyguard” in 2005, and “Tra Lamm” the following year.

Glasses became one of Ghanem’s recognizable trademarks from the beginning of his artistic career. He was known for wearing glasses in a wide variety of shapes and colors, often choosing different styles for his various roles.

In 2015, Ghanem portrayed Al-Halawani in the series “Lahfa”, which starred his daughter Donia Samir Ghanem. In 2016, he made a guest appearance in “Nelly and Sherihan”, which also featured his daughters Donia and Amy Samir Ghanem, followed by an appearance in “Fi La La Land” the following year.

In 2018, Ghanem appeared as a guest in “Hidden Worlds”, starring Adel Imam, and played Fayeq in “Azmi and Ashgan”, alongside Hassan Al-Raddad and Amy Samir Ghanem.

In 2019, he appeared in several roles in the series “Badal Al-Hadduta Talata”, starring his daughter Donia Samir Ghanem.

Samir Ghanem hosted a show on OTV called An Hour With Samir Ghanem.

After his death, his two daughters Donia Samir Ghanem and Amy Samir Ghanem received the honoring award of their parents from Joy Awards in Riyadh on January 27.

== Personal life ==
He was married to actress Dalal Abdel Aziz, and the father of actresses Donia and Amy.

== Death ==
Ghanem, who was recovering at a hospital from serious conditions after contracting COVID-19, died from complications of kidney functions and associated mucormycosis related to the infection at El Safa Hospital in Mohandiseen, Giza on 20 May 2021, at the age of 84.

His wife, Dalal Abdel Aziz, died on 7 August 2021, also from COVID-19 complications.

== Selected filmography ==
Ghanem participated in more than 300 acting roles including films, TV series and theater plays, the last of which was in the series Badal Al Hadduta Talata with his daughter Donia Samir Ghanem.

=== Plays by Tholathy Adwa'a El Masrah after 1970 ===
After El Deif Ahmed's death in 1970, Tholathy Adwa'a El Masrah continued producing plays. The two most famous are:

- Moseeqa Fel Hay El Sharey (Music in East District)
- Fondo’ El Talaat Wara’at (Three Cards Hotel)
- Al-Mutazawwigun (Married)

=== Later plays ===
While George Sidhom retired due to a brain stroke, Samir Ghanem continued producing plays.

- Mamno3 fe lelet el do5la
- Habash house (beit el habash)
- Goha Rules the City
- Faris wa Bani Khayban (The Knight and Disaster Clan)
- Akhuya Hayes wana Layes (Happy Is My Brother, Lost Am I)
- Ana wal-Nizam wa Hawak (Me, the Government and Your Love)
- Bahloul fi Istanbul (Bahloul in Istanbul)
- Ana wa Mirati wa Monica (Me, My Wife and Monica)

=== Films ===
- Khally Balak Min ZouZou
- Fi Saif Lazim Nohib
- El Mothneboon
- Easabat Al'nisa
- Al Baad Yathhab Lil Mathon Maratain (1978)
- The Hooligans Get Drafted (1984)
