= Yousry Nasrallah =

Egyptian film director (born 1952)

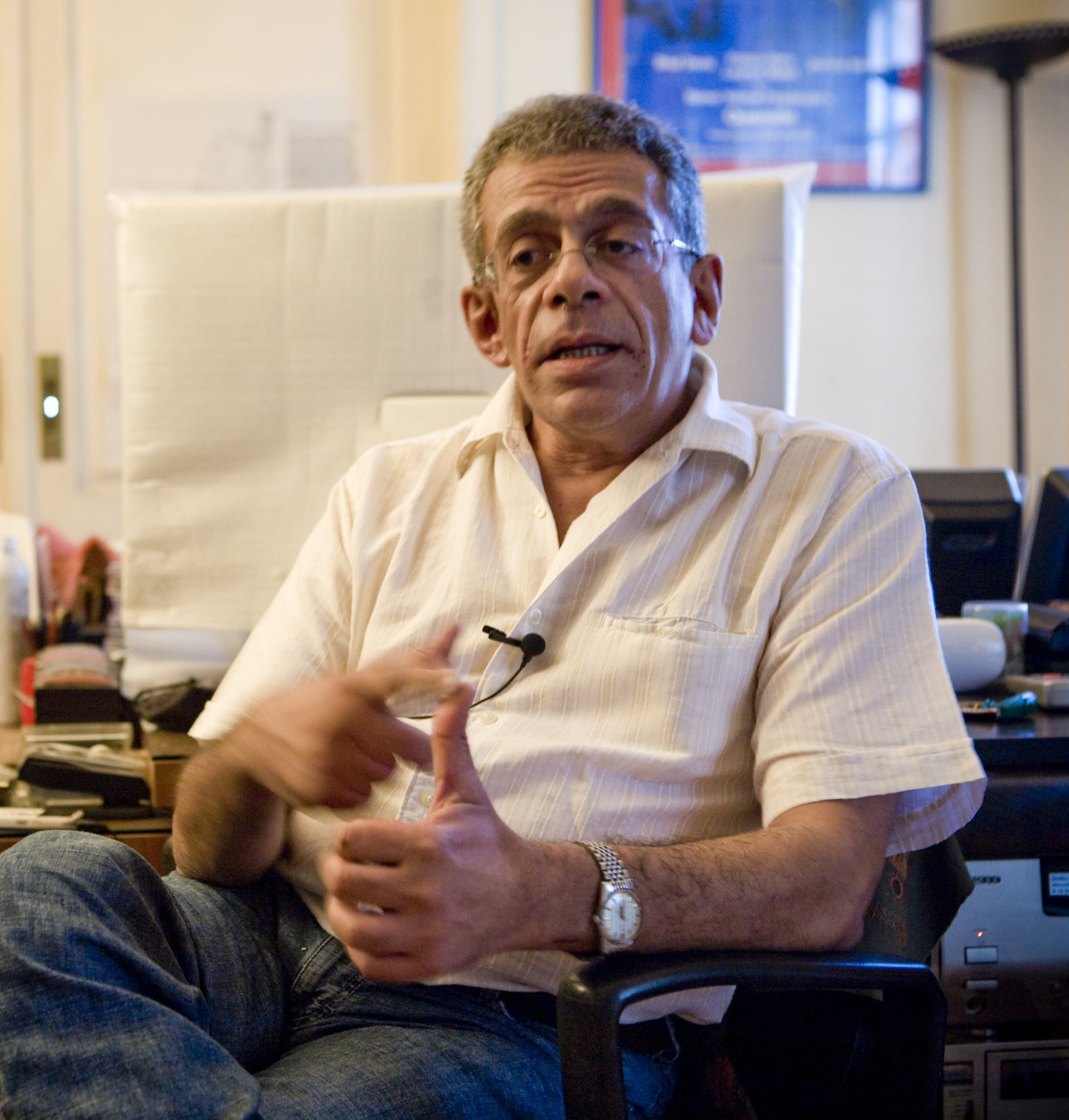
- Yousry Nasrallah in 2009.
- Born: 26 July 1952 (age 74); Cairo, Egypt
- Education: Cairo University; Cairo Higher Institute of Cinema
- Occupation: Film Director
- Years active: 1978-present
- Notable work: After the Battle

Yousry Nasrallah (Arabic: يسرى نصر الله pronounced [ˈjosɾi nɑsˤˈɾɑllɑ]) (born 26 July 1952) is an Egyptian film director.

== Biography ==
Nasrallah was born to a Coptic Christian family in Cairo. He grew up in Zamalek, in central Cairo. He graduated in economics and political science at Cairo University. Nasrallah enrolled at Cairo University to study economics and pollical science due to the Ma'had al-Sinima Film Institute required a bachelor's degree for enrolment. While at school at Cairo University, Narsrallah had joined the Egyptian Communist Workers Party as well as joining in democracy student movements.

Nasrallah graduated from Cairo University in 1978, and while he had enrolled in the Ma'had al-Sinima Film Institute, he would not continue due to the ways he felt it bored him and was too reactionary for his liking. Following, he worked as a film critic and directing assistant in Beirut from 1978 to 1982. He worked as a film critic at the Al-Safir newspaper, while at the same time removing himself from any political parties to free any potential art from the confines of a party. These separations and autonomy would lead him to create works influenced by leftist ideas and works more focused on stories about individuals. He became assistant to Youssef Chahine whose company Misr International would go on to produce his films. Nasrallah's works have dealt with themes of leftism, Islamic fundamentalism, and expatriation.

His 2012 film After the Battle competed for the Palme d'Or at the 2012 Cannes Film Festival.

== In The Film Industry ==
Nasrallah's film works have all mostly been funded by French state subsidies, film policies, as well as being produced by Misr International. Misr International is a company of Youssef Chahine, an Egyptian filmmaker who Nasrallah had worked with as an assistant on a movie before Nasrallah had begun making films. Before making his own films he also worked as an assistant to directors Volker Schlöndorf and Omar Amiralay. The connections made during these times as an assistant after graduation were very beneficial when he was ready to start making his own films.

Most of Nasrallah's works are also co-produced by a public Franco-German television channel called Arte that usually produces autonomous works of cinema such as Nasrallah's. Nasrallah's films had more success in Europe than in Egypt as they opened in Europe as well as participated in film festivals. His films struggled to find theaters in Egypt, when they did they were shown in non-commercial special screenings and had short runs.

== Works ==
Nasrallah's film works are generally focused on individuals stories and experiences, aiding in an Egyptian cinema renaissance in the early 2000s that followed this trend of focusing of individuals rather than groups, works existing separate or freed from a collective. Nasrallah's films have a focus on less privileged individuals and their realities as well as class difference. Some of Nasrallah's works tend show highlight marginalized people and showing the realities of these peoples.

Issues of religious representation were difficult to portray for Nasrallah's films as a Christian Egyptian, especially in the early 1990s when Islamism was on the rise. This would lead to instances of censorship such as in Nasrallah's film Mercedes (1993), where in Saudi Arabia all instances of Christianity in the film was cut, removing forty minutes from the film. Nasrallah's films have a style that also leads the audience to make their own opinions on the main characters.

One of Nasrallah's most important works is Scheherazade Tell Me A Story (2009), which as well as being his most successful box office film, is also a completely funded by an Egyptian Production company. The film, like most of his works, is about people telling their own stories, this time about women's lives, experiences and issues. The film was praised its social critique by the Egyptian press as well as applauded by French reviewers. The film's script was adapted by Wahid Hamid from The Yacoubian Building (2002), a novel by Alaa al-Aswany. Selling half a million tickets, this film became Nasrallah's most successful film, and gave Nasrallah further confidence about be able to reach larger and wider audiences.

== Films ==
- Sariqat Sayfiyya (Summer Thefts) (1985).
- Mercedes (1993).
- On Boys, Girls and the Veil (1995).
- El-Madina (The City) (1999).
- Bab el Chams (The Gate of Sun) (2003).
- Genenet al Asmak (The Aquarium) (2008).
- Ehki ya shahrazade (Scheherazade Tell Me a Story) (2009).
- After the Battle (2012)
- Brooks, Meadows and Lovely Faces (2016)

== Notes ==
- Shafik, V., Leaman, O. (ed.), 106, 2001, Companion Encyclopedia of Middle Eastern and North African Film, Routledge (ISBN 0-415-18703-6)
- Yousry Nasrallah:Biography and Filmography from Cannes Film Festival.
- link to New York Times Aug. 12, 2011 review of "Scheherazade, Tell Me a Story"
