= Ahmed Helmy =

Egyptian actor (born 1969)

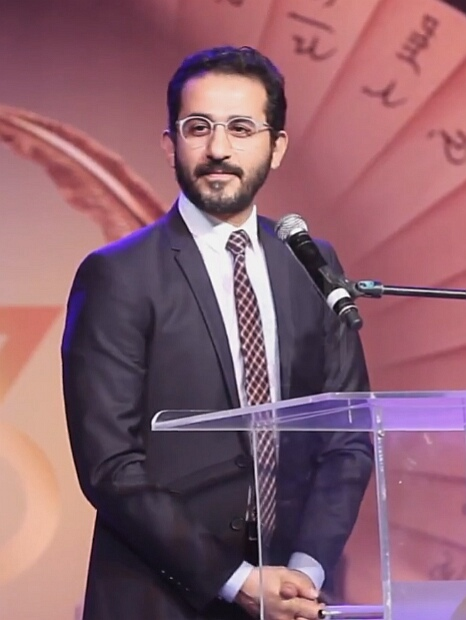
- Helmy at the Sawiris Foundation Awards, 2018
- Born: Ahmed Muhammad Helmy Abdel Rahman Awwad; 18 November 1969 (age 57); Banha, Qalyubiyya, Egypt
- Education: Higher Institute of Dramatic Arts, Egyptian Academy of Arts
- Occupation: Actor
- Years active: 1993–present
- Spouse: Mona Zaki (m. 2002)
- Children: Lily; Saleem; Younis

Ahmed Muhammad Helmy Abdel Rahman Awwad (Arabic: أحمد محمد حلمي عبد الرحمن عواد; born 18 November 1968) is an Egyptian actor. He began his career in 1993 as host of the children's program Leib Eyal (Kids' Play) on the Egyptian Satellite Channel. Helmy made his film debut in 1998 with Aboud at the Border (Aboud Ala El Hedoud), which introduced him to a wider audience. Over the following two decades, he became one of the most popular comedians in Egyptian cinema, known for leading roles in commercially successful films such as El Nazer (2000), Keda Reda (2007), and X-Large (2011).

== Early life ==
Helmy was born in Banha, Qalyubiyya Governorate, Egypt. He is the middle of three siblings, between his brother Khaled and sister Sally. At the age of eight, he moved with his family to Jeddah, Saudi Arabia, where his father was employed. After living there for ten years, he returned to Egypt and enrolled in the Academy of Arts, graduating in 1993 from the High Institute for Theatre Arts.

== Career ==
Ahmed Helmy began his acting career with a role in the television series Decent People (1993), before establishing himself in the media industry as a television presenter on several programs broadcast by Egyptian satellite channels. After gaining popularity through television, he transitioned to cinema, making his feature-film debut in Aboud on the Borders (1999), which became his breakthrough role. He subsequently established himself as one of Egypt’s leading comedic actors and stars.

Some of his most successful films include “Mido Mashakel” (2003), “Sayea Bahr” (2004), “Zaki Chan” (2005), “Keda Reda” (2007), “Asal Aswad” (2010), and “Wahed Tani” (2022). At the 15th Malmö Arab Film Festival, Helmy was honored for his contribution to Arab cinema. Festival president Mouhamad Keblawi described him as one of Arab cinema’s most distinguished stars, highlighting his work across both comedy and drama and his ability to address social issues through humor and human sensitivity. Helmy has received numerous awards from Egyptian and international festivals and has also served as a UNICEF Regional Ambassador, supporting initiatives concerning children’s rights and mental health awareness.

== Other ventures ==
Helmy was a judge on the Arab talent show, “Arabs Got Talent,” for its third season. He is also the author of a book called “28 Letters.”

== Filmography ==
=== Acting ===
Feature films and television
No.	Year	Title	Role
1	1999	Aboud at the Border (Arabic: عبود على الحدود)	Saeed
2	2000	El Nazer (The Headmaster, Arabic: الناظر)	Atef
3	2000	Omar 2000 (Arabic: عمر 2000)	Saeed
4	2000	Leh Khaletny Ahebak? (Why Did You Make Me Love You?, Arabic: ليه خلتني أحبك)	Zakaria
5	2001	Elsellem Wel Te'ban (Snakes and Ladders, Arabic: السلم والثعبان)	Ahmed
6	2001	55 Es'af (Ambulance 55, Arabic: 55 إسعاف)	Sayed
7	2001	Rehlet Hob (Love Journey, Arabic: رحلة حب)	Ramze
8	2001	Hakim Ayon (Eye Doctor, Arabic: حكيم عيون)	Helmy
9	2003	Mido Mashakel (Mido the Troublemaker, Arabic: ميدو مشاكل)	Mido
10	2003	Sahar El Layali (Sleepless Nights, Arabic: سهر الليالي)	Amr
11	2004	Saye' Bahr (The Beach Loafer, Arabic: صايع بحر)	Hasan "Hantirah"
12	2005	Zaki Chan (Arabic: زكي شان)	Zaki Salem El-Asyuti
13	2006	Zarf Tarek (Tarek's Situation, Arabic: ظرف طارق)	Tarek Hasan El-Wakil
14	2006	El Cinderella (Arabic: السندريلا)	Aziz
15	2006	Khalliteni Mogreman (Made Me a Criminal, Arabic: جعلتني مجرماً)	Rushdi Sarhan Abaza
16	2006	Matab Sena'i (Traffic Signal, Arabic: مطب صناعي)	Mimi
17	2007	Keda Reda (Arabic: كده رضا)	Reda (triple role)
18	2008	Asf Ala El-Ezaag (Sorry for the Disturbance, Arabic: آسف على الإزعاج)	Hasan Salah El-Din
19	2009	Alf Mabrouk (1000 Congratulations, Arabic: ألف مبروك)	Ahmed Galal
20	2010	Asal Eswed (Bittersweet, Arabic: عسل إسود)	Masri Sayyed El-Arabi
21	2010	El Gama'a (The Group, Season 1, Arabic: الجماعة)	Mohammed Awny Abdulsattar
22	2010	Bolbol Hayran (Bewildered Bolbol, Arabic: بلبل حيران)	Bolbol
23	2011	X-Large (Arabic: إكس لارج)	Magdi / Adel
24	2013	Ala Gothety (On My Dead Body, Arabic: على جثتي)	Raouf
25	2014	La Mo'akhza (Excuse My French, Arabic: لا مؤاخذة)	Narrator (voice)
26	2014	El Amalia Messi (Operation Messi, Arabic: العملية ميسي)	Messi (voice)
27	2014	Made in Egypt (Arabic: صنع في مصر)	Alaa El-Faresy / Panda
28	2016	Laf W Dawaran (Flimflam, Arabic: لف ودوران)	Nour Rabbani
29	2017	Horob Edterary (Forced Escape, Arabic: هروب اضطراري)	Cameo
30	2019	Khayal Ma'ata (Scarecrow, Arabic: خيال مآتة)	Yakan Fuad Sanhour / Aziz
31	2022	Wahed Tani (Another One, Arabic: واحد تاني)	Mustafa

=== Writing ===
Screenwriting
No.	Year	Title
1	1998	Leib Eyal (Child’s Play, Arabic: لعب عيال)
2	2011	18 Days

=== Producing ===
Production
No.	Year	Title
1	2013	Asia
2	2014	Countdown (Arabic: عد تنازلي)
3	2014	Made in Egypt

== Personal life ==
In 2002, Helmy married Egyptian actress Mona Zaki. They have three children: Lily, Salim, and Younis.

Helmy is the founder of the production company Shadows Communications and the author of the book 28 Harf.

In 2014, he revealed that he had undergone surgery in the United States to remove a tumor from his back.

Helmy has collaborated with the United Nations World Food Programme (WFP) to promote its "Food for Education" project, in partnership with the snack brand Chipsy.
