= Fatwa (2018 film) =

2018 Tunisian drama film

- Film Poster
- Persian: فتوى
- Directed by: Mahmoud Ben Mahmoud
- Produced by: Habib Ben Hedi; Jean-Pierre Dardenne; Luc Dardenne
- Starring: Ahmed Hafiane; Ghalia Benali; Sarra Hannachi; Jamel Madani; Mohamed Maghlaoui
- Edited by: Virginie Messiaen
- Production companies: Familia Productions; Les Films du Fleuve; Organisation Internationale de la Francophonie
- Distributed by: MAD Solutions
- Release dates: November 2018 (Carthage); 13 January 2019 (Tunisia)
- Running time: 102 minutes
- Countries: Tunisia; Belgium; France
- Language: Arabic

Fatwa is a 2018 Tunisian drama film directed by Mahmoud Ben Mahmoud, starring Ahmed Hafiane with Ghalia Benali, Sarra Hannachi, Jamel Madani, and Mohamed Maghlaoui in supporting roles. The film follows a man who returns to Tunis from France and finds out that his son was working for a radical Islamic group before his death.

== Synopsis ==
The film revolves around Brahim Nadhour, a man who returns to Tunis from France and finds out that his son Marouane was working for a radical Islamic group before his death.

== Cast ==
- Ahmed Hafiane as Brahim Nadhour
- Ghalia Benali as Loubna
- Sarra Hannachi as Marouane
- Jamel Madani
- Mohamed Maghlaoui

== Production ==
Fatwa was directed by Mahmoud Ben Mahmoud and co-produced by Habib Ben Hedi, Jean-Pierre Dardenne, and Luc Dardenne, through Familia Productions, Les Films du Fleuve, and Organisation Internationale de la Francophonie.

Virginie Messiaen edited the film.

== Release ==
The film premiered at the Carthage Film Festival in November 2018, and also screened at Cairo International Film Festival in the same year. It was released in Tunisia on 13 January 2019 and distributed by MAD Solutions.

It screened at Malmö Arab Film Festival in Malmö, Sweden, in September 2019.

It screened in many Arab countries as well as other western countries.

== Reception ==
Fatwa received mixed reviews from critics.

In 2018 at the Cairo International Film Festival, the film won two awards: Arab Cinema's Horizons Award for the Prix Saad Eldin Wahba pour le meilleur film and Best Arabic Film. In the same year, the film won two awards at the Carthage Film Festival: Best Actor in a Fiction feature film and Tanit d'Or for the Best Narrative Feature Film. Then in 2019, the film was nominated at the Malmö Arab Film Festival for the Jury Award for the Best Feature Film.
