= Malmö Arab Film Festival =

Swedish film festival

- Location: Malmö Sweden
- Founded: 2011
- Founded by: Mouhamad Keblawi
- Film titles: Arab cinema
- No. of films: 40 selections 11 countries (2021)
- Website: maffswe.com

Malmö Arab Film Festival (MAFF) is an Arab film festival based in Malmö, Sweden. MAFF is widely regarded as the most influential and largest Arabic film festival in Europe, and is the only one in Scandinavia. The first edition was held in 2011 and today the festival presents a broad selection of films made by Arab filmmakers or that in some way connects with questions of the Arab world or culture.

== Winners ==
=== Best Film ===
- 2011: Messages from the Sea, directed by Daoud Abdel Sayed (Egypt)
- 2012: Cairo Exit, directed by Hesham Issawi (Egypt)
- 2013: Blind Intersections, directed by Lara Saba (Lebanon)
- 2014: Adiós Carmen, directed by Mohamed Amin Benamraoui (Morocco)
- 2015: Theeb, directed by Naji Abu Nowar (Jordan)
- 2016: 3000 Nights, directed by Mai Masri (Palestine)
- 2017: Ali, the Goat and Ibrahim, directed by Sherif El Bendary (Egypt)
- 2018: Wajib, directed by Annemarie Jacir (Palestine)
- 2019: Exterior/Night, directed by Ahmad Abdalla (Egypt)
- 2020: A Son, directed by Mehdi Barsaoui (Tunisia)
- 2021: The Man Who Sold His Skin, directed by Kaouther Ben Hania (Tunisia, France)

=== Best Director ===
- 2013: Maggie Morgan for Asham: a man called Hope (Egypt)
- 2014: Hany Abu-Assad for Omar (Palestine)
- 2015: Amin Dora for Ghadi (Lebanon)
- 2016: Lotfi Bouchouchi for The Well (Algeria)
- 2017: Lotfi Achour for Burning Hope (Tunisia)
- 2018: Mohamed Al-Daradji for The Journey (Iraq)
- 2019: Bahij Hojeij for Good Morning (Lebanon)
- 2020: Amjad Abu Alala for You Will Die at Twenty (Sudan)
- 2021: Abdulaziz Alshlahei for The Tambour of Retribution (Saudi Arabia)

=== Best Actor ===
- 2011: Asser Yassin for Messages from the Sea
- 2012: Amine Ennaji for The Forgotten (Les oubliés de l'Histoire)
- 2013: Basse Samra for After the Battle
- 2014: Adam Bakri for Omar
- 2015: Nour El Sherif for Cairo Time
- 2016: Ashraf Barhom for The Curve (Al Munataf)
- 2017: Azelarab Kaghat for Hayat
- 2018: Ali Yahyaoui for Benzine
- 2019: Ahmed Hafiane for Fatwa
- 2020: Mohamed Hatem for When We're Born
- 2021: Salim Dau for Gaza mon amour

=== Best Actress ===
- 2011: Julia Kassar for Here Comes The Rain
- 2012: Nelly Karim for Cairo 678 (Les Femmes du bus 678)
- 2013: Waad Mohammed for Wadjda
- 2014: Yasmin Raeis for Factory Girl
- 2015: Malak Ermileh for Eyes of a Thief
- 2016: Menna Shalabi for Nawara
- 2017: Anissa Daoud for Burning Hope (Demain dès l’aube)
- 2018: Zahraa Ghandour for The Journey
- 2019: Fatima Attif for The Healer (La Guérisseuse)
- 2020: Najla Ben Abdallah for A Son
- 2021: Naima Lemcherki for Autumn of Apple Trees (L'Automne des Pommiers)
