= The Voice Kids: Ahla Sawt =

2016 Arabic TV series or program

- Genre: Reality television
- Created by: John de Mol
- Presented by: Aimée Sayah; Nardine Farag; Badr Al Zidane; Yasir Al-Saggaf
- Judges: Kadim Al Sahir (2016–2018); Tamer Hosny (2016–2018); Nancy Ajram (2016–2020); Assi El Hallani (2020); Mohamed Hamaki (2020); Ramy Sabry (2026–); Dalia Mubarak (2026–); Al Shami (2026–)
- Country of origin: Arab world
- Original language: Arabic
- No. of seasons: 4

Production
- Production companies: Talpa (2016–2018); ITV Studios (2020–)

Original release
- Network: MBC, LBCI
- Release: 2 January 2016 – 7 March 2020
- Release: 1 April 2026 – present

The Voice Kids: Ahla Sawt is an Arabic TV series airing on MBC 1 and MBC 3. It premiered on 2 January 2016. The three judges for the inaugural season were Tamer Hosny, Nancy Ajram and Kadim Al Sahir. There are four stages starting with the Blind Auditions. Contestants between the ages of 7 and 14 sing covers of already existing songs without being seen by the judges. If a coach likes the contestant's performance, they turn their chair. Each coach is allowed to have 15 contestants on their team.

The season 1 finale was on 5 March 2016 and the winning contestant was Lynn Al-Hayek from Lebanon from Team Kadim Al Sahir. The season 2 finale was on 3 February 2018, and the winner was Hamza Lebyed from Morocco from Team Kadim Al Sahir. The season 3 finale was on 7 March 2020 and the winner was Mohamed Islam from Syria from Team Nancy Ajram. The season 4 finale was on 24 June 2026 and the winner was Lama Qais from Yemen from Team Dalia Mubarak.

== Coaches' timeline ==
Coach	Seasons			
Coach	1	2	3	4
Nancy Ajram				
Tamer Hosny				
Kadim Al Sahir				
Assi El Helani				
Mohamed Hamaki				
Ramy Sabry				
Dalia Mubarak				
Al Shami				

== Series overview ==
Color key

- Team Nancy
- Team Tamer
- Team Kadim
- Team Assi
- Team Mohamed
- Team Ramy
- Team Dalia
- Team Al Shami

The Voice Kids: Ahla Sawt series overview
Season	Aired	Winner	Runner-up	Third Place	Winning coach	Presenters	Coaches (chairs' order)		
Season	Aired	Winner	Runner-up	Third Place	Winning coach	Presenters	1	2	3
1	2016	Lynn El Hayek	Amir Amoury	Zaen Obeid	Kadim Al Sahir	Aimée Sayyah	Kadim	Nancy	Tamer
2	2017-2018	Hamza Lebyed	Loujay Almasrahy	Ashrakat Ahmed	Kadim Al Sahir	Nardine Farag	Tamer	Nancy	Kadim
3	2020	Mohamad Islam Rmeih	Yasmine Osama	Mohamad Ibrahim	Nancy Ajram	Nardine Farag	Assi	Nancy	Mohamed
4	2026	Lama Qais	Sari Al-Salibe	Mohamed Adel	Dalia Mubarak	Andria Tayeh	Ramy	Dalia	Al Shami

== Season summaries ==
Season	Season 1 (2016)	Season 2 (2017–2018)	Season 3 (2020)	Season 4 (2026)
Broadcast period	2 January 2016	2 December 2017	4 January 2020	1 April 2026
Broadcast period	5 March 2016	3 February 2018	7 March 2020	24 June 2026
Winner	Lynn Al Hayek	Hamza Lebyed	Mohamad Islam Rmeih	Lama Qais
Runner-up	Amir Amoury	Loujay Almasrahy	Yasmine Osama	Sari Al-Salibe
Third place	Zaen Obeid	Ashrakat Ahmed	Mohamad Ibrahim	Mohamed Adel
Other Finalists	Mirna Hanna; Ghady Bechara; Jowairia Hamdy	Nour Wissam; Georges Assi; Maria Kahtan	Emna Damak; Yusuf Hassan; Mohamed Wakdid	Christina Mirakian; Ziyad Alsahati; Zakaria Sabounji; Murad Hameed; Adam Zeinedine; Muhamad Shaalan
Winning Coach	Kadim Al Sahir	Kadim Al Sahir	Nancy Ajram	Dalia Mubarak
Other Coaches	Tamer Hosny; Nancy Ajram	Tamer Hosny; Nancy Ajram	Assi El Helani; Mohamed Hamaki	Al Shami; Ramy Sabry
Host	Aimée Sayyah; Moemen Nur	Nardine Farag; Badr Al Zidane	Nardine Farag; Anabella Hilal; Yasser Al Mosleh	Andria Tayeh
Channel	MTV; MBC1; MBC Masr; MBC 3	LBCI; MBC1; MBC Masr; MBC 3	MBC1; MBC5; MBC Masr; MBC 3 MBC Iraq	MBC1; MBC Masr; MBC 3 MBC Iraq
