= The Alleys =

2021 Jordanian film by Bassel Ghandour

- الحارة
- Directed by: Bassel Ghandour
- Written by: Bassel Ghandour
- Produced by: Rula Nasser; Yousef Abed Alnabi
- Starring: Emad Azmi; Baraka Rahmani; Munther Rayahnah; Nadira Omran; Maisa Abd Elhadi
- Cinematography: Justin Hamilton
- Edited by: Eyad Hamam
- Music by: Nasser Sharaf
- Production companies: The Imaginarium Films; Bayt Al Shawareb; Lagoonie Film Production
- Distributed by: MAD Solutions
- Release dates: August 2021 (Locarno); June 9, 2022 (Jordan)
- Running time: 116 minutes
- Countries: Jordan; Egypt; Saudi Arabia; Qatar
- Language: Arabic

The Alleys (Arabic: الحارة, romanized: Al-Hara) is a 2021 Jordanian crime thriller film written and directed by Bassel Ghandour in his feature directorial debut. Set in a neighbourhood of East Amman, the film follows a small-time hustler whose secret relationship sets off a chain of blackmail, gossip and violence. It stars Emad Azmi, Baraka Rahmani, Munther Rayahnah, Nadira Omran and Maisa Abd Elhadi.

The film had its world premiere in the Piazza Grande section of the 74th Locarno Film Festival in August 2021, the first Jordanian feature to screen at the festival. It was released in Jordanian and Saudi cinemas in June 2022. Its uncensored version was released on Netflix in January 2023, where it became one of the most-watched films in Jordan; its profanity and its portrayal of Jordanian society provoked criticism from conservative members of the Jordanian parliament.

== Plot ==
In a gossip-ridden neighbourhood of East Amman, Ali, a young hustler who earns fees by steering tourists to an escort bar, is secretly in love with Lana. They hide the relationship from Lana's mother, Aseel, a beauty salon owner who disapproves of Ali's lower-class background. When Aseel receives a surveillance video of the couple in a compromising position, along with a demand for hush money, she turns to Abbas, a local gangster, to suppress the video and drive Ali away from her daughter; in exchange, she agrees to make up Abbas's call girls in her salon. As Aseel pressures Lana to accept another suitor, Ali urges her to elope with him and, before they flee, robs Abbas of the protection money he collects from the neighbourhood, cutting out the gangster's tongue in the fight. When Lana finds Ali's gun and the stolen cash, she abandons him, and Abbas and his loyal lieutenant Hanadi set out for revenge, leading to further violence.

== Cast ==
- Emad Azmi as Ali
- Baraka Rahmani as Lana
- Munther Rayahnah as Abbas
- Nadira Omran as Aseel
- Maisa Abd Elhadi as Hanadi

== Production ==
The Alleys is the first feature directed by Bassel Ghandour, who previously co-wrote and produced Theeb (2014), which was nominated for the Academy Award for Best Foreign Language Film at the 88th Academy Awards and won the BAFTA Award for Outstanding Debut. The film was produced by Rula Nasser of The Imaginarium Films and Yousef Abed Alnabi of Bayt Al Shawareb, with Shahinaz El-Akkad's Lagoonie Film Production as co-producer. It is a co-production between Jordan, Egypt, Saudi Arabia and Qatar. It was filmed in Jabal Al Natheef, a densely built neighbourhood of East Amman.

The project was developed through the EAVE Producers Workshop and received support from the Jordan Film Fund of the Royal Film Commission, the Doha Film Institute, Dubai Film Connection and the Red Sea Lodge. At the 2020 Cairo Film Connection, the co-production platform of the Cairo International Film Festival, it won the Badyã Award and the New Century Productions Prize, each worth US$10,000. Earlier that year it received the Works in Progress Post-production Development Award at the Eastern Promises industry programme of the Karlovy Vary International Film Festival.

The cinematography is by Justin Hamilton, the editing by Eyad Hamam, and the original score by Nasser Sharaf. A soundtrack album was released in September 2022.

== Release ==
The Alleys premiered in August 2021 in the Piazza Grande at the 74th Locarno Film Festival. It was the first Jordanian feature selected for the festival and the first Arab film shown in the Piazza Grande since 2008. It then competed for the Sutherland Award for best first feature at the BFI London Film Festival, and had its Arab premiere at the inaugural Red Sea International Film Festival in Jeddah in December 2021. In January 2022 it became the first Jordanian film selected for the International Film Festival Rotterdam.

The film was released commercially on 9 June 2022 in Jordan, through Arab Media Network, and in Saudi Arabia, through Rowad Media, opening in four Jordanian and 21 Saudi cinemas. The theatrical version had scenes with explicit language either removed or bleeped. It was released in the United Arab Emirates on 6 October 2022 and in Egypt in November 2022. MAD Solutions handled distribution in the Arab world, and the Paris-based company Elle Driver handled international sales.

The uncensored version was released on Netflix on 5 January 2023. In July 2024 it was added to the Arabic streaming service Shahid.

== Reception ==
=== Critical response ===
Reviewing the film from Locarno for Variety, Jay Weissberg found it "unattractively shot and weighed down by too many unappealing, witless characters", though he praised Nadira Omran's performance as Aseel. Screen Daily described the film as "by turns dark comedy, mystery thriller and crime drama". After its Netflix release, The New York Times recommended it as an international streaming pick, describing it as "somewhere between a mafia movie and a comedy of errors". Writing for Arab News in February 2023, William Mullally called it "the best-received film set in Jordan" since Theeb.

=== Controversy in Jordan ===
After its Netflix release, The Alleys topped the service's most-watched list in Jordan for several weeks. Audiences were divided: supporters praised what they saw as an "accurate take" on life in Amman, while critics called it a "false representation" of Jordanian society and objected to its obscene language. Conservative members of parliament condemned the film's profanity and its depiction of society. MP Muhammad Abu Suailik called for the Royal Film Commission, which had helped fund the film, to be prosecuted "for supporting films that distort the public image of Jordanian society", and MP Suleiman Abu Yahya demanded that actor Munther Rayahnah be stripped of his citizenship for defending the film on social media. The Royal Film Commission responded that its role is to promote film production in Jordan and "not [to have] oversight" of what types of films are made there.

=== Accolades ===
Award / Festival	Year	Category	Result	Ref.
Karlovy Vary International Film Festival – Eastern Promises	2020	Works in Progress Post-production Development Award	Won	
Cairo Film Connection (Cairo International Film Festival)	2020	Badyã Award	Won	
Cairo Film Connection (Cairo International Film Festival)	2020	New Century Productions Prize	Won	
BFI London Film Festival	2021	Sutherland Award	Nominated	
Festival du Premier Film d'Annonay	2022	Grand Prix du Jury	Won	
Malmö Arab Film Festival	2022	People's Choice Award	Won	
Malmö Arab Film Festival	2022	Special Mention (Feature Film Competition)	Won	
Critics Awards for Arab Films (Arab Cinema Center)	2022	Four nominations	Nominated	

== See also ==
- Cinema of Jordan
- List of Jordanian films
