= Ahmed Hafiane =

Tunisian actor (born 1966)

- أحمد الحفيان
- Born: 1 October 1966 (age 60); Ksour Essef, Tunisia
- Occupation: Actor
- Notable work: The Season of Men (2000)

Ahmed Hafiane (Arabic: أحمد الحفيان; born 1 October 1966) is a Tunisian actor.

== Biography ==
A student at the Higher Institute of Dramatic Art in Tunis, he was active in the theater (i) with Hichem Rostom, then in Tunisian cinema.

From 2007, with La giusta distanza by Carlo Mazzacurati, he played in Italian films.

In 2015, Ahmed Hafiane won the Roberto-Rossellini Prize for his role in the third season of the Italian soap opera Una grande famiglia (it), produced by Rai Uno2.

On November 10, 2018, he received the prize for male interpretation of the Carthage Cinematographic Days for his role in Fatwa by Mahmoud Ben Mahmoud.

== Filmography ==
=== Cinema ===
==== Feature films ====
- 1997: Keswa, the lost thread of Kalthoum Bornaz
- 2000: The Season of Men by Moufida Tlatli
- 2001: The Desert and the Forest by Gavin Hood (adaptation of the Black Gouffre by Henryk Sienkiewicz): Idrys
- 2002: Clay dolls by Nouri Bouzid
- 2002: The Song of the Noria by Abdellatif Ben Ammar
- 2002: Fatma by Khaled Ghorbal
- 2003: Bedwin Hacker by Nadia El Fani
- 2004: The Bookstore of Nawfel Saheb-Ettaba
- 2004: Summer wedding of Mokhtar Ladjimi
- 2006: Bin El Widyene by Khaled Barsaoui: Ahmed Hafiane
- 2007: La giusta distanza by Carlo Mazzacurati
- 2009: La straniera by Marco Turco (it)
- 2009: La cosa giusta (it) by Marco Campogiani
- 2010: La nostra vita by Daniele Luchetti
- 2010: Chronicle of the agony of Aïda Ben Aleya
- 2010: Scontro di civiltà per un ascensore a Piazza Vittorio by Isotta Toso
- 2011: Black gold by Jean-Jacques Annaud
- 2012: Mahmoud's Professor Ben Mahmoud
- 2013: Ugly, greedy and stupid by Ibrahim Letaïef: Chef Hédi
- 2014: Tutto molto bello (it) by Paolo Ruffini (it)
- 2015: Suburra by Stefano Sollima
- 2016: Aleppo flower by Ridha Behi
- 2017: El Jaida by Salma Baccar
- 2018: Fatwa of Mahmoud Ben Mahmoud

==== Short films ====
- 2006: Train Train of Taoufik Béhi
- 2006: The Rendezvous of Sarra Abidi
- 2013: Wooden Hand by Kaouther Ben Hania
- 2014: Un giro di valzer by Stefano Garrone
- 2015: Il bambino by Silvia Perra
- 2016: Mariam de Faiza Ambah
- 2018: Watermelons of the Sheikh of Kaouther Ben Hania

=== Television ===
- 1995: Al Hasad by Abdelkader Jerbi
- 2006: The Gospel of Judas (documentary)
- 2009: Aqfas Bila Touyour from Ezzeddine Harbaoui
- 2011: L'ombra del destino (it)
- 2013: Paura di amare (it)
- 2014–2015: Naouret El Hawa by Madih Belaïd
- 2015: Una grande famiglia (it)
- 2015: Criminal Squadra of Giuseppe Gagliardi (it)
- 2016–2017: Flashback by Mourad Ben Cheikh
- 2016: Bolice 2.0 by Majdi Smiri
- 2018: 4 Blocks
- 2019: El Maestro by Lassaad Oueslati
- 2022: Harga by Lassaad Oueslati : Lamine
