= Mai Ezz Eldin =

Egyptian actress (born 1985)

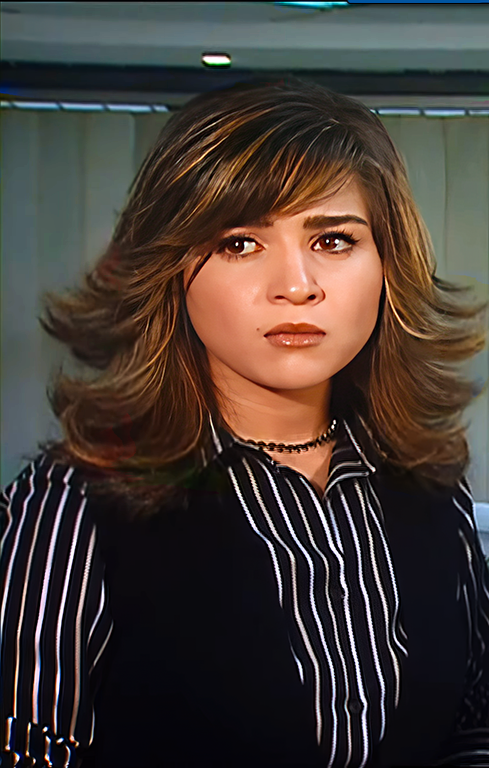
- Ezz Eldin in 2004
- Born: Mahitab Hussain Ezz Eldin; January 19, 1980 (age 46); Abu Dhabi, United Arab Emirates
- Education: Alexandria University
- Occupation: Actress
- Years active: 2001–present

Mai Ezz Eldin (born 19 January 1980 in Abu Dhabi) is an Egyptian actress. She is known for her roles in both film and television, including the films Love Journey (2001), Bent benout (2006), Ayathon (2006), Omar & Salma (2007), and Kheit harir (2020).

== Early life ==
She was born in Abu Dhabi to a Muslim father and Christian mother. She lived there for four years before moving to Egypt, and resided in Alexandria where she completed her studies in Sociology at Alexandria University.

== Career ==
She first gained recognition for her role in the 2001 film Love Journey with Mohamed Fouad which was also her first acting role. She has subsequently acted in various comedy films, including the likes of Ayathon (2006), Shikamara (2007), Omar & Salma (2007), Omar & Salma 2 (2009), Omar & Salma 3 (2012), and Game Over (2012). In television, she is known for her roles in Where is My Heart (2002) alognside Yousra, The Truth and Mirage (2003) with Fifi Abdou and Yousuf Shaaban, Interview on Live (2004), Bent Benout (2006), Adam (2011) alongside Tamer Hosny, The Suspicion (2013), Dalaa Albanat (2014) with Kinda Alloush, Letters (2018), for which she received the award for Best Actress from Der guest magazine, as well as Princess Beesa (2019).

== Personal life ==
She got married on November 12, 2025. She was formerly engaged to Egyptian footballer Mohamed Zidan, but they later split in 2009. She has stated that while her mother is Christian, she was raised Muslim.

== Filmography ==
=== Films ===
Year	Film	Role
2001	Love Journey	Mai
2003	Call Mama	Dalia
2004	Farah	Shokreya
2004	Kimo and Anthemo	Samia
2005	Booha	Ketta
2006	Ayathon	Effat/Nesma/Zebda
2006	Justified Betrayal	Reem
2007	Omar & Salma	Salma
2007	Agamista	Abeer
2007	Shikamara	Shikamara, Gayda
2008	My Sleepy Love	Nesma
2009	Omar & Salma 2	Salma
2010	El lembi 8 gega	Naglaa
2012	Omar & Salma 3	Salma
2019	The Money	herself

=== TV series ===
Year	Name	Role
2002	Where Is My Heart	Farah
2003	The Truth and Mirage	Manal
2004	Mahood Almasry	Yasmin
2004	Who Will Buy This Flower	Sherwit
2004	Interview on Live	Shahd
2006	Bent Benout	Nawwara
2010	Man and Six Women	herself
2010	Safiya Case	Safeya
2011	Adam	Nancy
2013	The Suspicion	Wasila
2014	Girls Needs	Korya
2015	Love Case	Malak/Eshk
2016	Waad	Waad
2018	Letters	Hala
2019	Princess Beesa	Beesa/Sekseka
2020	Kheit Hareer	Mesk
