= Ramy Sabry =

Ramy Sabry may refer to:

- Ramy Sabry (singer) (born 1978), Egyptian singer
- Ramy Sabry (footballer) (born 1987), Egyptian footballer
