= Forbidden Love =

Forbidden Love may refer to:

== Film ==
- Forbidden Love (1920 film), a German silent film by Erik Lund
- Forbidden Love (1927 film), a German silent film by Friedrich Feher
- Forbidden Love (1938 film), a Czech film
- Forbidden Love (1940 film), or The Man from Niger, a French film
- Forbidden Love (1982 film), an American TV film

== Television ==
- Forbidden Love (2004 TV series), a South Korean drama series
- Forbidden Love (2011 TV series), a Syrian television series
- Forbidden Love (2020 TV series), an Indian television series
- Forbidden Love: The Unashamed Stories of Lesbian Lives, a 1992 Canadian documentary film
- Aşk-ı Memnu (2008 TV series), a Turkish Romantic drama television series
- Verbotene Liebe, a German daytime soap opera
- Zabranjena ljubav, a Croatian daytime soap opera
- Zabranena Lyubov, a Bulgarian soap opera

== Music ==
- The Forbidden Love EP, a 2000 EP by Death Cab for Cutie
- "Forbidden Love", a 1994 song by Madonna from Bedtime Stories
- "Forbidden Love", a 2005 song by Madonna from Confessions on a Dance Floor
- "Forbidden Love", a 1979 song by Madleen Kane
- "Forbidden Love", a song from the musical Zombie Prom

== Literary ==
- Forbidden Love (novel), a 2003 novel by Norma Khouri

== See also ==
- Forbidden Lover (disambiguation)
