= Dry Hot Summers =

2015 Egyptian short film by Sherif El Bendary

- Theatrical release poster
- Directed by: Sherif El Bendary
- Screenplay by: Nura El Sheikh
- Produced by: Claudia Jubeh
- Starring: Mohamed Farid; Nahed El Sebai
- Cinematography: Victor Credi
- Edited by: Emad Maher
- Production companies: Subtype Productions; Red Star Films; Africa Films
- Release date: December 2015 (Dubai Film Festival)
- Running time: 30 minutes
- Country: Egypt
- Language: Arabic

Dry Hot Summers (Arabic: حار جاف صيفاً, transliterated: Har gaf sayfan) is a 2015 Egyptian short film directed by Sherif El Bendary. It was an official selection at Clermont-Ferrand International Short Film Festival.

== Plot summary ==
One summer day in Cairo creates an unexpected encounter between two strangers on opposite chapters of their lives. Shawky is a silent old man struggling with cancer, who only has a few weeks left. Doaa is an energetic young woman who grabs her last chance to marry and start a new life in another city, building up a family, she herself so desperately misses. Both are isolated from society in different ways. Since his son is too busy to accompany him, Shawky is alone on his way to see a tumor specialist, a French physician, who is in Cairo for just a few days and means his last hope. Shawky's yellow plastic bag containing all his x-rays and medical tests are accidentally taken by the young woman (Doaa) he shares a taxi with. Doaa is getting ready for her wedding party later that night, but as she lives all alone in the city, only her motherly neighbor helps her with the busy preparations. As Doaa rushes through the city, the bridal bouquet gets lost and is picked up by Shawky, who is following her in search of his yellow plastic bag. The lost x-rays and the lost flowers oblige them to spend a fraught and exhausting day together, a journey through the city that plants the seed of hope where they never expected it. Before he catches his appointment with the doctor and she finally arrives at her wedding party, the two isolated people reconnect against all odds and form a human bond as they realize the preciousness of this very moment in their lives.

== Cast ==
- Mohamed Farid - Shawky
- Nahed El Sebai - Dooa

== Awards and nominations ==
- Official selection, Clermont-Ferrand International Short Film Festival
- Best Short Film (shared), Malmö Arab Film Festival
- Best Director, Bangalore International Short Film Festival
- Best Short Film, Oran International Arabic Film Festival
- Best Short Film, Ismailia International Film Festival
- ACT Award, Ismailia International Film Festival
