= Omar & Salma 2 =

- Arabic: عمر_وسلمى_2_(فيلم) عمر_وسلمى_2_(فيلم) (Omar We Salma 2)
- Directed by: Ahmed Al-Badri
- Written by: Tamer Hosny, Ahmed Abdel Fattah
- Story by: Tamer Hosny
- Produced by: Mohammad El-Sobki
- Starring: Tamer Hosny, Mai Ezz Eldin
- Music by: Nabil Ali Maher
- Production companies: Rotana Studios, El-Sobki Film Production
- Distributed by: Rotana Studios, El-Sobki Film Production, United Brothers, United Group of Arts
- Release date: 19 May 2009
- Country: Egypt
- Language: Arabic

Omar & Salma 2 (Arabic: عمر_وسلمى_2_(فيلم) is the sequel to the Egyptian comedy, drama film Omar & Salma starring Tamer Hosny & Mai Ezz Eldin.
