= Nahed El Sebai =

Egyptian actress (born 1987)

- ناهد السباعى
- Born: Nahed Medhat El Sebai; 25 May 1987 (age 39); Egypt
- Occupation: Actress
- Years active: 2004–present
- Relatives: Farid Shawki (grandfather); Huda Sultan (grandmother); Rania Farid Shawki (half-aunt)

Nahed Medhat El Sebai (Arabic: ناهد مدحت السباعى; born 25 May 1987) is an Egyptian actress. She has appeared in films since 2004. She is the granddaughter of Farid Shawki and Huda Sultan.

== Selected filmography ==
Film
Year	Title	Role	Notes
2009	Scheherazade, Tell Me a Story		
2010	678		
2011	18 Days		
2011	X Large		
2012	After the Battle		
2015	Sukkar Mor		
2015	Dry Hot Summers		
2016	Haraam Elgasad		
2016	Yom Lel Settat		
2016	Ali Meaza wa Ibrahim		
2018	White Lie		
2018	Immobilia Crime		
2019	This is My Night		
2019	The American Game		
2021	Mako		
2023	Two For Rent		
2023	19B		
