= Asser Yassin =

Egyptian actor, writer, and film producer

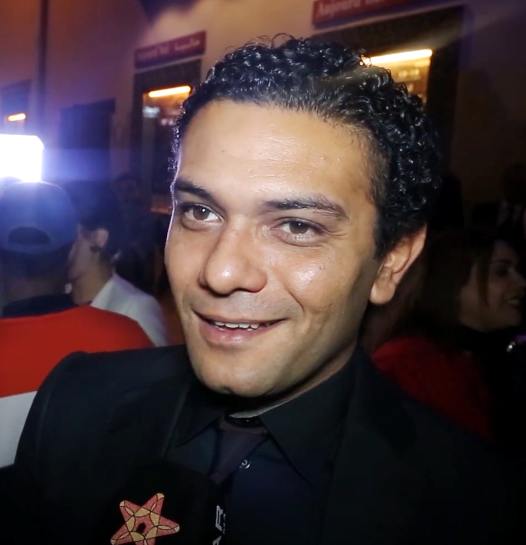
- Born: Asser Ashraf Fouad Yassin; 25 February 1981 (age 45); Cairo, Egypt
- Occupations: Actor; Film producer; Writer
- Years active: 2006–present
- Awards: Best Actor at the Carthage Film Festival

Asser Ashraf Fouad Yassin (Arabic: آسر أشرف فؤاد ياسين; born 25 February 1981) is an Egyptian actor, writer, and film producer. He has been awarded Best Actor for several of his works. Yassin began his career on the stage of the American University in Cairo spotted by director Khairy Beshara

== Early life ==
Yassin studied engineering at university, but acted in some short films made by a fellow student who was the son of the film director Khairy Beshara. Encouragement from Beshara led to Yassin deciding to become an actor.

== Career ==
Yassin starred in the film Beit Men Lahm ("House of Flesh"), based on the Arabic novel by Yusuf Idris, directed by Rami A. Jabbar. Director Khairy Beshara gave him a role in the television series Qalb Habiba. Shortly after this his cinema debut followed with small roles in The Yacoubian Building and Halim.

Yassin appeared in supporting roles such as Marei, the villain brother to Ashraf Abdel Baqi in Aala Ganb Yasta and Mo, the drug addict in Zay El Naharda. His first leading role was in the action film Al Waad or "The Promise", written by Waheed Hamid and directed by Mohamed Yassin.

Yassin's turning point was his leading role in Messages from the Sea, written and directed by Daoud Abdel Sayed.

Rags and Tatters (2013) was Yassin's first co-production experience when he worked with Film Clinic and Graal on a film about the Egyptian poor and their living situation after the Egyptian Revolution of 2011. Yassin played the leading role which was mostly silent.

In 2015, Yassin won best actor at the Tetouan International Mediterranean Film Festival for his latest release, Aswar El Qamar.

In 2020 he played a lead role alongside Nelly Karim in the tv series Meet Wesh (100 faces). The tv series achieved huge success.

2022 was a particularly successful year for Asser Yassin. During Ramadan, he starred as the lead in “Suits Arabia”, a remake of the American legal drama series. Less than two months later, he returned in another leading role in MBC’s crime thriller “The Eight”, which attracted strong reviews and high ratings.

== Personal life ==
Yassin is the eldest of two boys. Both his parents are engineers. Yassin is married with three children.

== Filmography ==
Title	Year	Role
Aserb: The Squadron	2024	
Diamond Dust	2018	Taha
Ali, the Goat and Ibrahim	2016	Officer
Aswar Al Qamar	2015	Ahmed
Rags and Tatters	2013	
Bebo wa Bashir	2011	Bashir
Messages from the Sea	2010	Yahia
Ehna Et2abelna Abl Keda / We Met Before	2008	Hesham
Al Waad / "The Promise"	2008	Adel
Zay El Naharda	2008	Mo
Cryptic Reflections	2008	
El Gezira	2007	Mahmoud
Halim	2006	Mustafa
Ala Ganb Yasta	2006	Marei

== TV ==
Title	Year	Role
Mit Wesh/Multifaceted	2020	Omar
Every week has a friday	2020	Emad
El Ahd	2015	Maheeb
1001 Arabian Nights/Alf Leila W Leila	2015	Saad
The Yacoubian Building	2007	Taha
Qalb Habiba	2006	

== Awards ==
- Festival International Cinéma Méditerranéen Tétouan, 2015, Best Actor for his role in Aswar El Qamar
- Malmö Arab Film Festival 2011, Best Actor for his role in Messages from the Sea
- Carthage Film Festival 2010, Best Actor for his role in Messages from the Sea
