= The Light of My Eyes =

- Film poster
- Arabic: نور عيني
- Directed by: Wael Ihsan
- Written by: Tamer Hosny; Ahmed Abdel Fattah
- Screenplay by: Ahmed Abdel Fattah
- Story by: Tamer Hosny
- Produced by: El-Sobki Film Production Company (Mohammad El-Sobki)
- Starring: Tamer Hosny; Menna Shalabi; Menna Fadali
- Edited by: Moataz Al-Katab
- Distributed by: United Group of Arts
- Release date: May 12, 2010
- Country: Egypt
- Language: Arabic

The Light of My Eyes (Arabic: نور عيني, romanized: Noor Einy) is a 2010 Egyptian romantic comedy-drama film directed by Wael Ihsan.

== Plot ==
The Light of My Eyes is about Ahmad (who goes under the stage name Noor) a young music composer (Tamer Hosny) and a blind girl named Sarah (Menna Shalabi) and the great love story between them. Sarah breaks up with Noor after a misunderstanding, and decides to go to America for surgery in order to regain her eyesight. While Noor deals with the death of his brother, he has to live with the fact that Sarah has left him. As she moves on with her life, she falls in love with her doctor Tarek (Amr Youssef), who decides to marry her back in Egypt. What she does not know is that Tarek and Noor are childhood friends, and when Noor meets Tarek at the airport he finds out that his friend's fiancée is his love, Sarah. While Sarah thinks that she sees Tarek's friend Ahmad, she does not know the fact that its Noor. Noor ends up facing the heartbreak silently until the events lead up to the discovery of this strange twist of fate!

== Release ==
The film was released in cinemas on May 12. The Light of My Eyes was placed first on the Arabian box office after a week of its release with 4.000.000 LE It was still on top of the Arabian box office after 2 weeks of release with 8.600.000 LE.

== Soundtracks ==
1. "Yana Ya Mafish" from album Ikhtart Sah
2. "L Awel Mara" from album Ikhtart Sah
3. "Ya Waheshni" from album Ikhtart Sah
