= Call Mama =

Kalem Mama (Talk to Mom)
- Directed by: Ahmad Awwadh
- Written by: Mostafa El Sobki
- Release date: June 15, 2003 (Egypt)
- Running time: 90 minutes
- Country: Egypt
- Language: Arabic (English subtitles)
- Budget: $673,733

Kalem Mama (Call Mama) is a 2003 Egyptian romantic comedy film written by Mostafa El Sobki and directed by Ahmad Awwadh.

== Synopsis ==
A young girl named Muna continues her studies after the tragic loss of her father. She meets Sayed, a man with whom she becomes romantically inclined and wants to get married. Muna's mother does not approve of their upcoming marriage because he has not finished his studies and thinks of Sayed as a failure. Muna and her four girl friends take on the obstacles her mother sets forth in order to continue their love, and endure a variety of ups and downs throughout the voyage.

== Cast ==
- Menna Shalabi
- Mai Ezz Eldin
- Abla Kamel
- Hassan Hosny
- Ahmed Zaher
- Talaat Zakaria
- Maha Ahmed
- Tamer Samir

== Production ==
The project was filmed during late 2002 in Cairo.
