= Excuse My French (film) =

- Theatrical release poster
- Directed by: Amr Salama
- Screenplay by: Amr Salama
- Produced by: Mamdouh Saba; Hady El Bagory; Hany Osama; Mohamed Hefzy
- Starring: Ahmed Helmy; Hani Adel; Kinda Alloush
- Cinematography: Islam Abdelsamie
- Edited by: Baher Rasheed
- Music by: Hani Adel
- Production companies: Film-Clinic; The Producers
- Release date: January 22, 2014
- Running time: 99 minutes
- Country: Egypt
- Language: Arabic

Excuse My French or Excuse Me (Arabic: لا مؤاخذة, romanized: Lā muʼākhdhah) is a 2014 Egyptian film comedy directed by Amr Salama, based on Salama's own experiences at a public middle school in Egypt after his return from Saudi Arabia. Excuse My French (La Moakhza) is Salama's third feature, a movie that stirred considerable controversy during its release in 2014. The film was rejected by censors more than three times before it was finally released at the beginning of this year.

Hany is a bright student, has many friends, likes to go to church and adores his father. With his father’s unexpected death, his mother can no longer afford the expenses of private school, and is forced to send him to public school. There, Hany is mistakenly presumed Muslim, and uses this situation to his advantage. However, when the truth is revealed, he must face a myriad of unforeseen problems. This turbulent comedy about religious and class differences humorously and boldly addresses critical issues in Egypt. The film was initially deemed too sensitive by the censorship board and Salama was forced to adjust the script while trying to preserve the film's core concept of religious discrimination. Even after the changes, though, the censors refused the film again in 2010, claiming that it would fuel sectarian strife and that it did not reflect behaviours that exist in Egyptian society.

== Plot ==
Taking place in Egypt, Excuse My French follows 12-year-old Hany, played by Ahmed Dash, as he tries to fit in at his new public school following the death of his banker father. The death of Hany's father leaves his mother unable to afford to keep him in private school. Hany's privileged background shows through his style of dress and alienates him for his peers. Another thing that separates him is that he is also the only Christian in a classroom full of Muslims.

After Hany is mistaken for a Muslim after a mistake he makes in his French language class. Hany decides to play along in order to gain acceptance from his classmates; to do this Hany tries to excel in science, memorise the Quran, being better at football and learning new music. This works until one day Hany is beaten up by the class bully and his mother takes him to the principal's office. This embarrasses him an serves as the moment when he is unmasked as a Christian. In these interactions the larger context of religious interactions in Egypt and Amr Salama own experiences as a boy are critique in a comical way.

== Cast ==
- Ahmed Helmy as Storyteller
- Hani Adel as Abdallah Peter
- Kinda Allouch as The Mother
- Ahmed Dash as Hany Abdallah Peter

== Reception ==
=== Critical response ===
'Excuse My French' has received mixed reviews from the Egyptian and national media.

Nick Vivarelli, an international correspondent for Variety Magazine, said regarding censorship issues that, "the film’s very sensitive subject has also been plagued by problems with the Egyptian censorship authorities who had blocked it at one point." Tom Palmer, of ScreenRellish, said in regards to the humor in the film, "[it] lies in its lack of conviction towards its “Faith is for God and homeland is for all” purported message of peace and harmony."

=== Box office ===
'Excuse My French' reached the top of the Egyptian box office in the first week of its theatrical release, during which it was shown in 31 theaters. The movie was able to make over £E8 million 12 weeks after its release.

=== Festivals/Awards ===
- BFI London Film Festival
- Luxor Egyptian and European Festival

== See also ==
- Amr Salama
