= Sherif El Bendary =

Egyptian film director, writer, and producer (born 1978)

- Born: 29 September 1978 (age 47); Cairo, Egypt
- Occupation(s): Film director, screenwriter, film producer
- Years active: 2005–present

Sherif El Bendary (Arabic: شريف البنداري; born 29 September 1978) is an Egyptian film director, writer and producer. His debut feature film was Ali, the Goat and Ibrahim.

== Life and career ==
Sherif graduated from the Faculty of Applied Arts in 2001 and then worked in textile factories. Later, he joined the Egyptian Film Institute in 2002 and graduated in 2007, where he currently teaches film directing. His directorial debut was the 2006 short film Rise and Shine starring Hend Sabry and produced by the National Film Center, the film won numerous awards locally and internationally including Tribeca Film Festival. In 2008, El Bendary wrote and directed At Day's End based on a short story by the acclaimed Egyptian novelist Ibrahim Aslan. In 2011, he directed the feature-length documentary On the Road to Downtown and the short film Curfew which is a part of the anthology film 18 Days – official selection Cannes Film Festival. In 2014, his short film Dry Hot Summers won the Robert Bosch Stiftung film prize from the Berlinale Talents campus, it premiered at Clermont-Ferrand International Short Film Festival and Dubai International Film Festival. In 2017, He released his first feature-length narrative film Ali, the Goat and Ibrahim an Egyptian/Emirati/French co-production, which won the Best Actor prize at Dubai International Film Festival and was released in Egypt and France and many other countries. He also directed the TV series Al Gamaa Part 2, written by veteran screenwriter Wahid Hamed and was broadcast in 2017.

He served as a jury member in several festivals including Cairo International Film Festival, El Gouna Film Festival, and the Egyptian National Film Festival.

In 2019, El Bendary founded Africa Films, a production company that mainly focuses on short and feature films by promising upcoming first- and second-time directors, and which will also produce Spray, his second feature film.

== Filmography ==
=== Feature-length films ===
- On the Road to Downtown (2011) (Documentary)
- Ali, the Goat and Ibrahim (2016)

=== Short films ===
Year	Film	Credited as		
Year	Film	Director	Writer	Producer
2005	Six Girls	Yes	Yes	No
2006	Rise and Shine	Yes	No	No
2008	At Day's End	Yes	Yes	No
2011	18 Days (segment "Curfew")	Yes	No	No
2015	Dry Hot Summers	Yes	No	Yes
2019	Sunday at Five	Yes	Yes	Yes

=== Television ===
- Al-Gamaah 2 (2016) (TV Series)

== Festivals and awards ==
Rise and Shine (2006)
- Jury Prize, National Film Festival
- Golden Hawk, Rotterdam Arab Film Festival
- Jury Prize, Ismailia International Film Festival
- Best Short, AMAL- International Euroarab Film Festival
- Media Award, Tirana International Film Festival
- Mohamed Shebli prize for Best Short Film

At Day's End (2008)

- Silver Muhr Award, Dubai International Film Festival
- Cine Cinema Award, Aix-en-Provence Tous Courts Short Film Festival
- Prix du Jury Jeune, Aix-en-Provence Tous Courts Short Film Festival
- Best Short Film, Noah's Ark International Film Festival
- Official selection, Tribeca Film Festival

On the Road to Downtown (2011)

- Best Short Documentary, Ismailia International Film Festival

Dry Hot Summers (2015)

- Official selection, Clermont-Ferrand International Short Film Festival
- Best Short Film (shared), Malmö Arab Film Festival
- Best Director, Bangalore International Short Film Festival
- Best Short Film, Oran International Arabic Film Festival
- Best Short Film, Ismailia International Film Festival
- ACT Award, Ismailia International Film Festival

Ali, the Goat and Ibrahim (2016)

- Best Feature Film, Malmö Arab Film Festival
- Best Actor, Dubai International Film Festival
