= Etolubov =

Ukrainian singer (born 1990)

ETOLUBOV Любов Фоменко
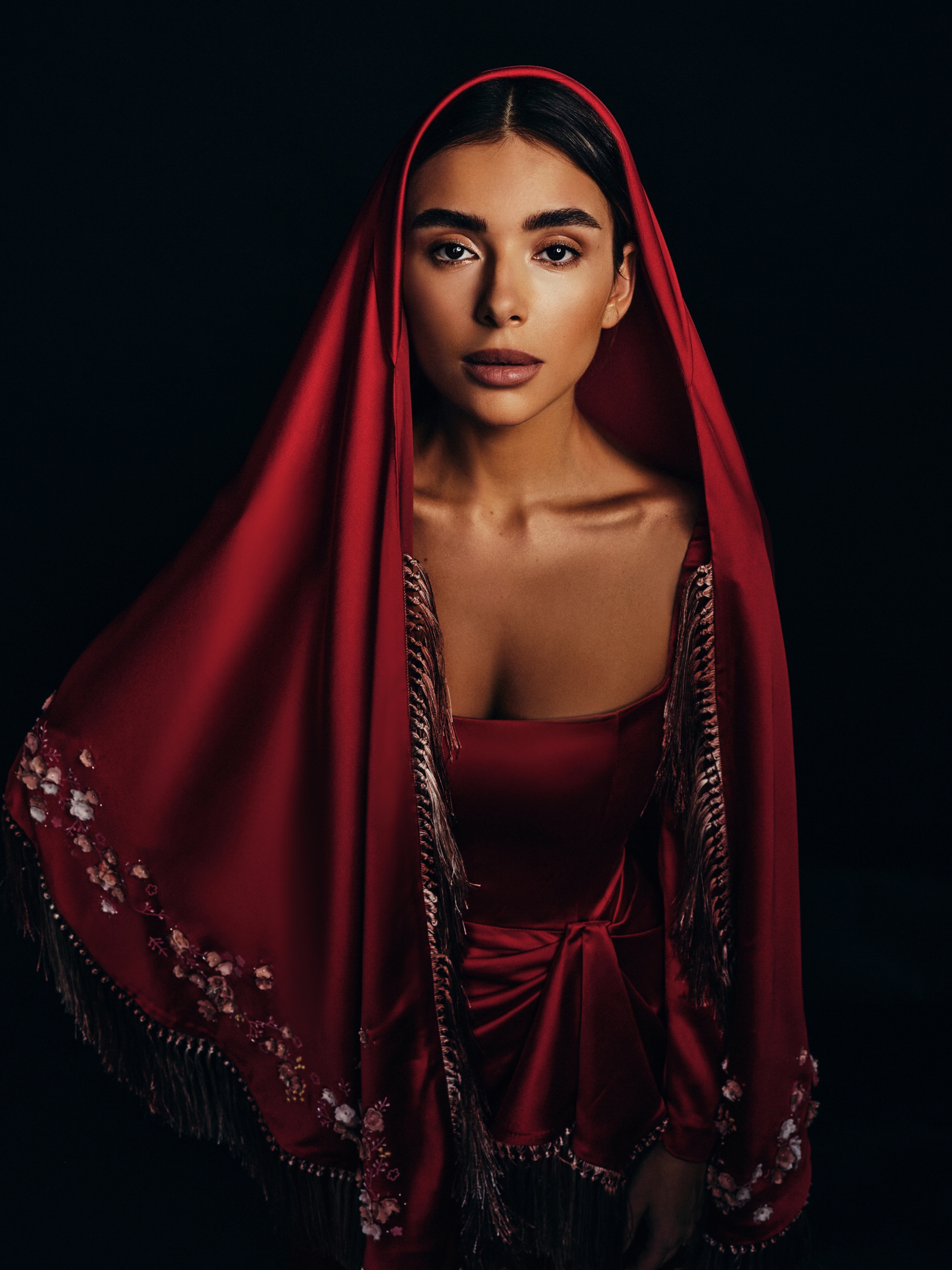

Background information
- Born: Lubov Fomenko; August 12, 1990 (age 36); Odesa, Ukrainian SSR
- Origin: Ukraine
- Genres: indie-pop, neo-pop
- Occupation: singer
- Years active: 2021–present
- Website: etolubovmusic.com

Lubov Fomenko (Ukrainian: Любов Фоменко), performing under the stage name ETOLUBOV (born August 12, 1990), is a singer of Ukrainian origin.

== Musical career ==
=== 2021-2022: Early singles and debut EP ===
ETOLUBOV released her debut single, “Загадала”, in 2021, accompanied by a lyric video. Later that year, she released the single “Ты такой,” with a music video directed by Alan Badoev.

Also in 2021, she released the single “Пионы,” followed by “Обману тебя” later that year. In September, ETOLUBOV released the single “Притяжение." The song appeared on the global Shazam chart, reaching number 33, and received significant circulation on social media platforms. The accompanying video was filmed near Kherson and Mykolaiv.

In late 2021, ETOLUBOV signed a recording agreement with Warner Music Group. In November 2021, she released the single “Манго,” with a music video directed by Alan Badoev.

In late 2022, ETOLUBOV released her debut EP "Pryrechena na Lubov," containing four tracks: "Kviten," "Rymuu," "Yaka," and "Pryrechena."

=== 2023-present: Debut album and international success ===
In November 2023, she released the English language EP Attraction, which included multiple versions of the title track.

In 2023, ETOLUBOV recorded 001SHOW, a visual performance project filmed in Bali and released in conjunction with VSELUBOV.

On June 11, 2024, ETOLUBOV released an Arabic remix of "Attraction," featuring the Egyptian singer Ramy Sabry.

== Artistry ==
=== Voice, musical style, and production ===
ETOLUBOV’s musical style has been described as neo-pop with elements of soul, electronica, and Eastern traditions.

== Discography ==
=== EP ===
- 2022 — Pryrechena Na Lubov
- 2023 — Attraction

=== Singles ===
- 2021 — Загадала
- 2021 — Ты такой
- 2021 — Ты такой (Remixes)
- 2021 — Пионы
- 2021 — Обману тебя
- 2021 — Притяжение
- 2021 — Манго
- 2022 — Притяжение (Official Remix)
- 2022 — Римую (ETOLUBOV & Max Barskih)
- 2023 — Thisislove
- 2023 — Куба
- 2024 — Attraction (Arabic Remix) featuring Ramy Sabry

=== Studio albums ===
- 2024 — VSELUBOV

== Videography ==
Year	Title	Director
2021	Ты такой	Alan Badoev
2021	Пионы	Alan Badoev
2021	Притяжение	Lubov Fomenko
2021	Манго	Alan Badoev
2022	Римую	Ksenia Kargina
2022	pryrechena (Mood video)	Lubov Fomenko
2022	kviten (Mood video)	Lubov Fomenko
2022	yaka (Mood video)	Lubov Fomenko
2023	Thisislove (Mood video)	Lubov Fomenko
2023	Attraction	Lubov Fomenko
2023	001SHOW	Alan Badoev
