= Amr Salama =

Egyptian film director

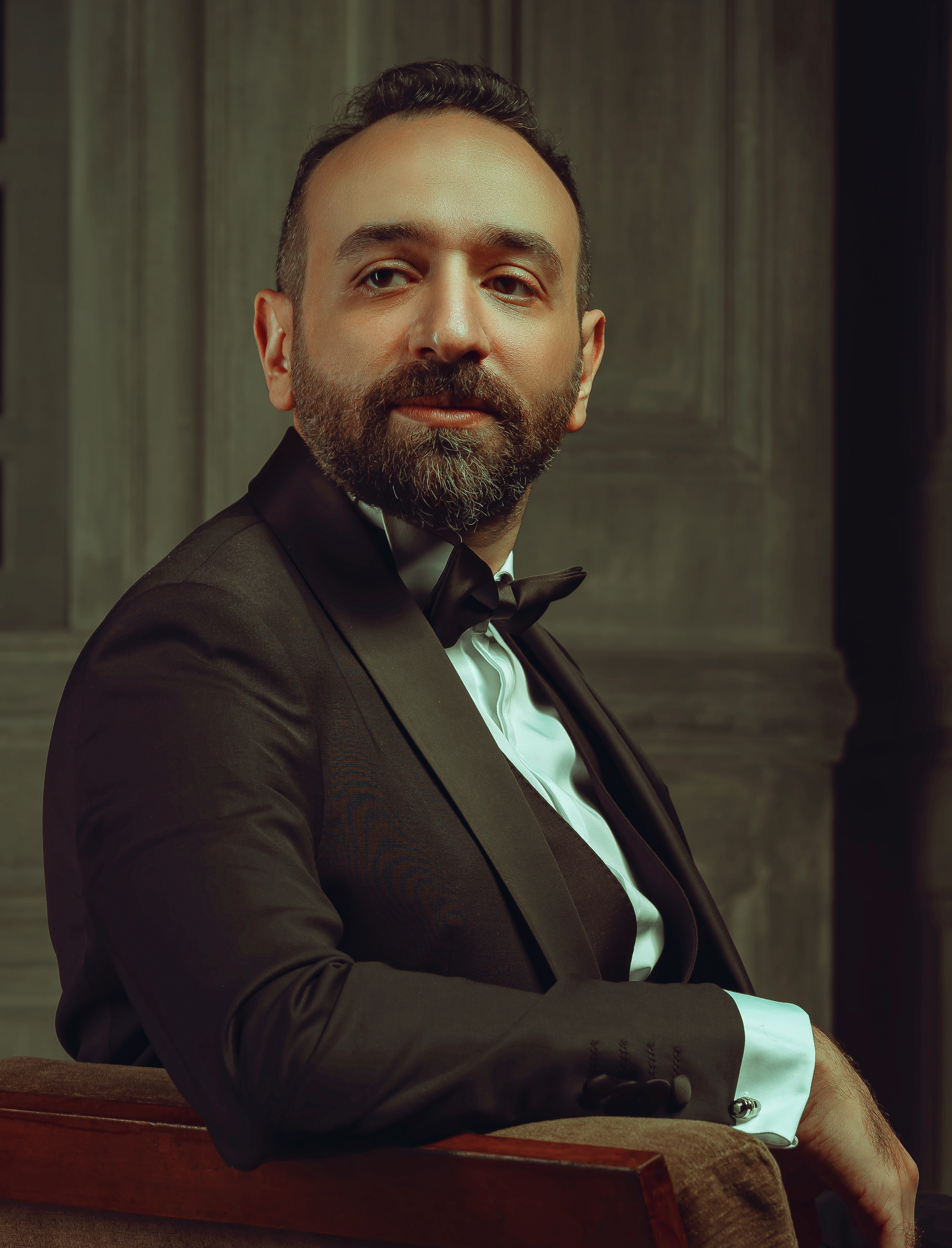
- Born: 22 November 1982 (age 43); Riyadh, Saudi Arabia
- Occupations: Film director, screenwriter, blogger, writer
- Known for: On A Day Like Today (2008), Asmaa (2011), Excuse My French (2014)

Amr Salama (Arabic: عمرو سلامة; born 22 November 1982) is an Egyptian film director, blogger, screenwriter, and author.

== Film career ==
Born in Riyadh, Saudi Arabia, he later moved with his family back to Egypt. He began his directing career primarily with short movies and commercials, after which he shifted to full-length movies.

Amr Salama's released his first feature movie, Zay El Naharda (On a Day Like Today) in 2008.

In 2009, Salama submitted the script for a second movie, Excuse My French, based on, by his own admission, his experiences at a public middle school in Egypt after his return from Saudi Arabia. Excuse My French tells the story of Hany Abdulla Sousa, a student at a private international school who comes from a Coptic family. After the death of his father the family's socio-economic status drops and he is forced to go to a public school, where he is routinely confronted with episodes of bullying on the part of his classmates. Rejected by the Censorship Board on the ground that "there is no sectarianism in Egypt," Salama started working on what would become his second creation, the AIDS-themed Asmaa, which earned him international attention. Premiered at the Abu Dhabi International Film Festival, the movie won the award for Best Arab Director in the New Horizons competition and two awards at the Fribourg International Film Festival.

After the 2011 Revolution, the director renewed his attempt by submitting the script for Excuse My French again, however the script was again rejected. With the appointment of another movie director to the Censorship Board, Ahmed Awad, the movie was finally approved. When speaking about the censorship issues he had to deal with, Salama stated that "[The Censorship Board] thought that this film provokes Christians, and they thought that this film would cause a civil war."

After releasing Excuse My French, Salama went on to release another film in 2014, Made in Egypt. This film focuses on a little girl and her desire for her stuffed animal and her older brother to switch bodies so the stuffed animal could inhabit her brother's body. The little girl gets her wish and the plot continues with the brother being mischievous in the stuffed animal's body, while the stuffed animal does much more in the brother's body than he was doing in it.

On 26 May 2019 he announced he would direct his first project with Netflix, a series called ما وراء الطبيعة (Paranormal), released in 2020.

He is a member of the Academy of Motion Picture Arts and Sciences.

== Writing career ==
Along with his directing career, Salama has also released a book, A Kiosk Guy: A Journey in Search of the Handlebars. This book has reached the top of Al-Shorouk's selling list and was also printed in four editions within the first two months of its release. Since the release of A Kiosk Guy: A Journey in Search of the Handlebars, Salama had released another book, Return to Sender: Short Stories, Sort of. As with his first book, this book has also reached the top of best-selling lists in Egypt.

== Filmography ==
=== Films ===
- On a Day Like Today (2008)
- Tahrir 2011: The Good, the Bad, and the Politician (jointly with Tamer Ezzat, Ahmad Abdalla and Ayten Amin)
- Asmaa (2011)
- Excuse My French (2014)
- Made in Egypt (2014)
- Sheikh Jackson (2017)
- Fireworks (2023)

=== Television ===
- Tayea (2018)
- Paranormal (2020)
