= Al Shami (singer) =

Syrian singer-songwriter (born 2002)

- Born: Abdul Rahman Fawaz; 1 June 2002 (age 24)
- Origin: Damascus, Syria
- Genre: Arabic pop
- Occupation: Singer
- Instrument: Vocals
- Years active: 2021–present

Abdul Rahman Fawaz (Arabic: عبد الرحمن فواز; born 1 June 2002), professionally known as Al Shami (Arabic: الشامي), is a Syrian singer and songwriter. He rose to prominent regional fame in the early 2020s, and became one of the most streamed contemporary Arab pop and urban artists in the Middle East and North Africa region. Al Shami is primarily known for blending traditional Levantine musical scales with modern pop and electronic beats. His singles "Ya Leil W Yal Ein" and "Sabran" have topped regional charts and gathered hundreds of millions of views on YouTube and other streaming platforms.

== Early life ==
Abdul Rahman Fawaz was born in Damascus, Syria. Following the escalation of the Syrian Civil War, he relocated to Turkey as a young boy, spending his early years in Eastern Turkey before eventually moving to Istanbul. While living in a Turkish town where he was the only resident originally from Damascus, locals began calling him "Al Shami" (meaning "The Damascene" or "The Levantine"). He adopted the name as his permanent stage name. Before entering the music industry full-time, Fawaz worked various service jobs, including working in restaurants, while teaching himself music production and songwriting.

== Career ==
=== 2021–2023: Early releases and breakout ===
Al Shami began uploading his music to digital platforms in 2021, releasing early tracks like "Chill" and "Layla" which dealt with personal struggles, displacement, and identity. Commercially, his breakthrough came in the summer of 2023 with the release of the single "Ya Leil W Yal Ein" (يا ليل ويالعين). The song became a viral sensation across TikTok and quickly topped regional charts, establishing him as a mainstream pop fixture in the Arab World.

=== 2024–present: Regional stardom and collaborations ===
In early 2024, Al Shami solidified his commercial presence with the release of "Sabran" (صبرًا) and "Doctor" (دكتور), both of which surpassed 100 million views on YouTube shortly after its release. In January 2024, he won the "Favorite Song" award at the Joy Awards in Riyadh, Saudi Arabia. Al Shami shifted his base of operations to Beirut, Lebanon. He has collaborated with other artists, including a joint track with Egyptian pop star Tamer Hosny and custom compositions written for fellow Syrian singer Assala Nasri and Egyptian singer Hany Shaker. In 2026, he released the high-profile duet "Aayesh La Oyounak" alongside former The Voice Kids winner Lynn El Hayek. Also in 2026, he became a coach on the fourth season of The Voice Kids.

== Artistry and public image ==
Al Shami composes nearly all of his own material. He has been credited with bridging the gap between traditional Arabic pop and modern urban genres. His tracks often utilize the "White Dialect" (a generalized Levantine Arabic understood widely across the region) mixed with fast-paced rhythmic deliveries and distinctively melancholic melodies. His visual identity and unfiltered public persona has garnered praise predominantly from younger audiences, but has occasionally drawn criticism from traditionalist music critics. His career has been heavily facilitated by social media, which is a central source of both his positive and negative reception.

== Discography ==
=== Singles ===
- "Chill" (2021)
- "Layla" (2021)
- "Bfdiki" (2023)
- "Ya Leil W Yal Ein" (2023)
- "Sabran" (2024)
- "Sameteek sama"
- "Bfdiki"
- "Doctor" (2024)
- "Wein" (2024)
- "Aayesh La Oyounak" (with Lynn El Hayek) (2026)

== Awards and nominations ==
- 2024 Billboard Arabia - Top Male Artist Levantine Dialect
- 2024 Billboard Arabia - Top Arabic Artist Levantine Dialect
- 2024 Billboard Arabia - Top Levantine Song —
- 2024 Billboard Arabia - Top Indie Song
- 2024 Joy Awards: Winner, Favorite Song ("Ya Leil W Yal Ein")
- 2026 Joy Awards: Nominated, Favorite Song
