= Dalia Mubarak =

Saudi Arabian singer-songwriter

- Born: 2 March 1991 (age 35)
- Origin: Riyadh, Saudi Arabia
- Genres: Arabic pop
- Occupation: Singer
- Instrument: Vocals
- Years active: 2014–present

Dalia Mubarak (Arabic: داليا مبارك; born 2 March 1991) is a Saudi Arabian singer and recording artist. She rose to fame in the Arab world following the release of her debut single "Qalab El Tawela" (Turn the Table) in 2014. Mubarak is widely recognized as a prominent female Saudi contemporary pop artists, blending traditional Khaliji rhythms with modern pop and R&B elements. She is signed to Warner Music Group.

== Early life ==
Dalia Mubarak was born in Riyadh, Saudi Arabia. She developed a passion for singing at an early age and frequently performed at school events and family gatherings. Encouraged by her family to pursue her musical talents, she looked for opportunities in a regional music industry that, at the time, had limited infrastructure for female artists within the country.

== Career ==
=== 2014–2016: Breakthrough and debut album ===
Mubarak's professional career began in 2014 when she released her breakthrough singles, "Qalab El Tawela" (Turn the Table) and "Kalbi Thani" (My Second Heart). The songs quickly gained traction across the Persian Gulf region, accumulating millions of views on digital platforms. Following her initial success, she signed with Rotana Music Group, the largest entertainment company in the Arab world. In 2016, she released her debut studio album, Min Al Akher (From the Very End). The album was a commercial success, cementing her status as a rising star in the Khaliji music scene.

=== 2017–present: Regional success and international collaborations ===
Mubarak continued to release numerous singles and EPs, frequently performing at major music festivals across the Middle East, including the Riyadh Season, Souq Waqif Entertainment Festival in Doha, and various concerts in the United Arab Emirates. In 2022, Mubarak signed a global recording contract with Warner Music Records. Her subsequent projects featured a more experimental fusion of Western pop and traditional Middle Eastern genres. In November 2022, she won the "Favorite Female Artist" award at the Joy Awards in Riyadh, one of the region's prestigious entertainment accolades. In 2023, Mubarak released her second studio album, 11:11. The following year, she released her third album, Basma. In 2026, Mubarak became a coach on The Voice Kids: Ahla Sawt and coached the winner of the season, Lama Qais.

== Artistry ==
Mubarak's music is predominantly categorized as Khaliji pop. She sings primarily in the Gulf dialect of Arabic but has experimented with other regional dialects and English lyrics. Vocally, she is known for her range and emotional delivery. As a Saudi woman navigating the music industry during a period of rapid cultural evolution and liberalization in Saudi Arabia, Mubarak is frequently cited as a trailblazing figure for young female artists in the country.

== Personal life ==
Mubarak was married to American boxing coach Alhim Starks, with whom she has two daughters. The couple separated in late 2022.

== Discography ==
=== Studio Albums ===
- Min Al Akher (2016)
- 11:11 (2023)
- Basma (2024)

=== Selected Singles ===
- "Qalab El Tawela" (2014)
- "Kalbi Thani" (2014)
- "Ma Keda Al Taba'a" (2016)
- "Beet Al Sha'ar" (2018)
- "Kerefto" (2020)
- "Al Shok" (2021)
- "Sada Al Sout" (2024)
