= Zay El Naharda =

2008 film by Amr Salama

- Poster of Zay El Naharda
- Directed by: Amr Salama
- Written by: Amr Salama
- Produced by: Rotana Studios; Film Clinic
- Starring: Basma Hassan; Ahmed El Fishawy; Asser Yassin; Arwa Gouda; Nabeel Eissa
- Cinematography: Ahmed Gabr
- Edited by: Amr Salama
- Music by: Hany Adel
- Release date: 1 October 2008
- Country: Egypt
- Language: Arabic

Zay El Naharda (Arabic: زي النهاردة, On a Day Like Today) is a 2008 Egyptian thriller film, it was the debut of its writer and director Amr Salama.

== Plot ==
Mai falls in love with Ayman, who passes away chasing her brother Mohammad, a drug addict, who stole her bag. The story repeats itself with the same exact dates a year later with her new boyfriend Yaser. Mai asks for her friend's help, Riham who works as a psychiatrist as she detects Ayman's diaries with the help of his father and figures that the same story happened to Ayman, whose girlfriend died a year prior his death.

The movie kicks off with Mai telling what happened in the very end, where she is racing time to save Yaser from her brother, who is about to shoot him. She splits the story into two parts, the first concerning Ayman and the second concerning Yaser. Events are ambiguous a mysterious, but they unravel through the film.

In the end, the first scene is shown again, with the fact about Ayman's story being revealed. Mai reaches Yaser's apartment to find her brother pointing a gun towards Yaser, so she rushes and takes the bullet. The movie ends with Yaser on a date with Noura, Mai's friend. He announces his love for her, on the same exact day that he announced his love for Mai, one year before. And the interesting fact is that on one of the movie's scenes, in Yaser's apartment, a picture of him is shown where he stands next to Ayman.

== Cast ==
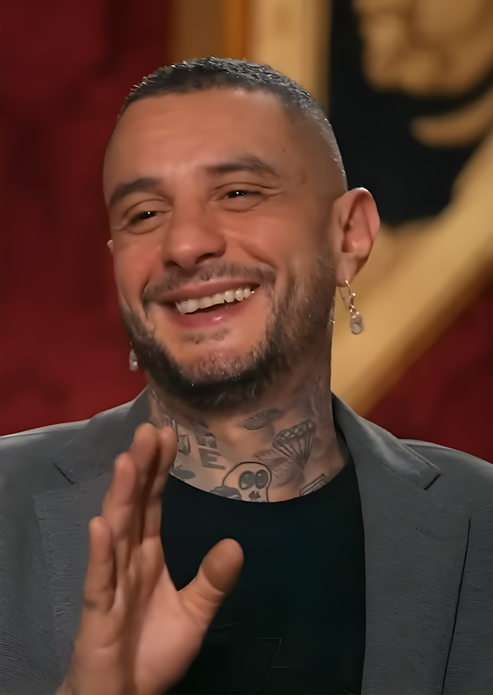
Yaser — Ahmed El-Fishawy

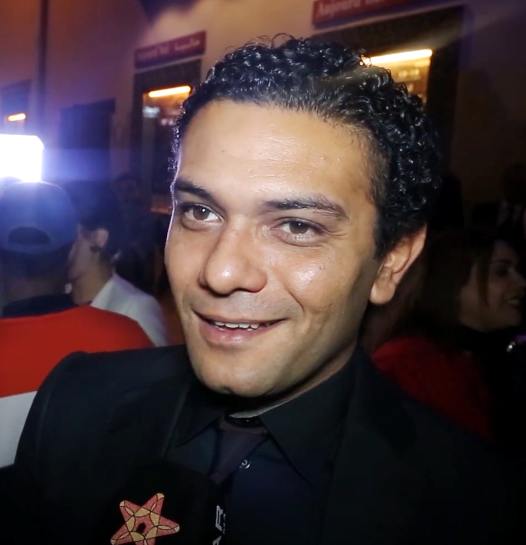
Mohammad — Asser Yassin

- May - Basma Hassan
- Yaser — Ahmed El Feshawy
- Mohammad — Asser Yassin
- Hala — Arwa Gouda
