= Land of Dreams (1993 film) =

1993 film

- Directed by: Daoud Abdel Sayed
- Written by: Hani Fawzi
- Starring: Faten Hamama
- Release date: 1993
- Running time: 118 minutes
- Country: Egypt
- Language: Arabic

Land of Dreams (Arabic: أرض الأحلام, romanized: Arḍ al-Aḥlām) is a 1993 Egyptian comedy film directed by Daoud Abdel Sayed. The film was selected as the Egyptian entry for the Best Foreign Language Film at the 67th Academy Awards, but was not accepted as a nominee.

== Cast ==
- Faten Hamama as Nargis
- Yehia El-Fakharany as Raouf
- Hesham Selim as Magdi (son)
- Ola Rami as Daughter

== See also ==
- List of submissions to the 67th Academy Awards for Best Foreign Language Film
- List of Egyptian submissions for the Academy Award for Best Foreign Language Film
