= Forbidden Lover =

Forbidden Lover may refer to:

- "Forbidden Lover" (song), a 1998 single by L'Arc-en-Ciel
- The Power of Love (film), a silent film, a.k.a. Forbidden Lover
- Forbidden Lover (album), a 1987 album by Nancy Wilson

== See also ==
- Forbidden Love (disambiguation)
