= El Badla =

2018 Egyptian film directed by Mohamed Gamal El-Adl

- Directed by: Mohamed Gamal El-Adl
- Written by: Ayman Wattar
- Produced by: Walid Mansour
- Starring: Tamer Hosny; Akram Hosny; Amina Khalil; Maged El-Masri
- Cinematography: Ahmed Kardous
- Edited by: Ahmed Hafez
- Music by: Hassan El Shafei
- Distributed by: New Century Production
- Release date: August 20, 2018 (Egypt)
- Running time: 110 minutes
- Country: Egypt
- Language: Arabic

El Badla (Arabic: البدلة, lit. The Suit) is a 2018 Egyptian comedy film directed by Mohamed Gamal El-Adl and starring Tamer Hosny and Akram Hosny. It is a remake of the 2014 American film Let's Be Cops.

== Plot ==
Walid (Tamer Hosny) and Hamada (Akram Hosny) are two friends who are struggling with their careers. Walid is a failed actor who works as a delivery man, while Hamada is a football referee, but he doesn't do well in it. They decide to dress up as police officers for a costume party, hoping to impress some girls. However, they soon realize that civilians and even cops think they are the real deal. Seeing this as an opportunity for female attention and perks, the duo begin a spree of crazy adventures. They also meet Rim (Amina Khalil), a beautiful journalist who is investigating a corruption case involving a powerful businessman named Markos (Maged El-Masri).

The duo's fun come to a grinding halt, once they are confronted by Markos and his thugs, who are after a USB drive that contains evidence of his crimes. Walid and Hamada are forced to rely on themselves and their fake badges to survive the dangerous situation and expose Markos.

== Cast ==
- Tamer Hosny as Walid Gamal, a failed actor and delivery man who pretends to be a cop
- Akram Hosny as Hamada, a rookie football referee and Walid's best friend who also pretends to be a cop
- Amina Khalil as Rim, a journalist and Walid's love interest
- Maged El-Masri as Markos, a corrupt businessman and the main antagonist
- Dalal Abdulaziz as Nagat, Walid's mother
- Mahmoud El Bezzawy as the chief prosecutor
- Salwa Mohamed Ali as Dr. Layla El-Arabi, a psychiatrist who treats Walid and Hamada
- Tamer Amin as a broadcaster
- Yasser Ali Maher as Dr. Salah, a dentist who helps Walid and Hamada
- Mohamed Alaa as Filibo, a street performer and Walid's friend
- Magdi Abdelghani as himself, a former football player and Walid's idol
- Hasan El-Raddad as a guest star
- Ahmed Elkholy as a guest star

== Reception ==
The film was released on August 20, 2018, and became a box office hit in Egypt. It grossed over $3.8 million worldwide, making it the highest-grossing Egyptian film of 2018.

The film received mixed reviews from critics and audiences. Some praised the film's humor, action, and chemistry between the lead actors, while others criticized the film's plot, direction, and resemblance to the original film.
