= Bibo and Beshir =

- Directed by: Maryam Abu Awuf
- Written by: Karim Fahmy; Hesham Maged
- Produced by: Walid Al Kurdi
- Starring: Menna Shalabi; Asser Yassin
- Release date: 2011
- Country: Egypt
- Language: Arabic

Bebo and Beshir (Arabic: بيبو وبشير, translit. Bebo Wa Beshir) is a 2011 Egyptian film in which Beshir (Asser Yassin), a young Egyptian-Tanzanian man, becomes friends with Bebo (Menna Shalabi) and falls in love with her. Forced by the circumstances, he finds himself living with Bebo in the same house.
