= Mohamed Maghlaoui =

Algerian politician

- محمد مغلاوي
- Born: 5 May 1944
- Died: 7 May 2009 (aged 65)
- Occupation: Politician

Mohamed Maghlaoui was the Algerian minister for housing in the 1995 government of Mokdad Sifi.
