= 18 Days (film) =

- Directed by: Ahmad Abdalla; Mariam Abou Ouf; Kamla Abu Zikri; Ahmed Alaa; Mohamed Ali; Sherif Arafa; Sherif El Bendary; Marwan Hamed; Khaled Marei; Yousry Nasrallah
- Produced by: Lighthouse Films - Partner Pro - Shadows - Video 2000 - Film Clinic
- Release date: May 18, 2011 (Cannes)
- Country: Egypt
- Language: Arabic

18 Days (Arabic: ١٨ يوم, translit. Tamantashar Yom) is an Egyptian anthology film focusing on the 18 days of the 2011 Egyptian revolution. It premiered at the 2011 Cannes Film Festival. It consists of 10 short films from 10 different filmmakers.

== Films ==
- Retention by Sherif Arafa
- God’s Creation by Kamla Abou Zikri
- 19-19 by Marwan Hamed
- When the Flood Hits You... by Mohamed Ali
- Curfew by Sherif El Bendary
- Revolution Cookies by Khaled Marei
- Tahrir 2/2 by Mariam Abou Ouf
- Window by Ahmad Abdalla
- Interior/Exterior by Yousry Nasrallah
- Ashraf Seberto by Ahmad Alaa

== Controversy ==
When the film was initially screened in Cannes, there was controversy due to two filmmakers participating in Egypt's 2005 presidential campaign, leading to suspicion of political bias.
