= Kalthoum Bornaz =

Tunisian film director

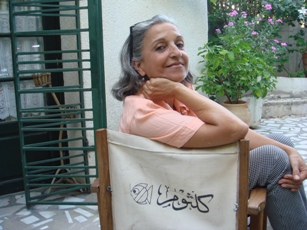
- Born: 24 August 1945; Tunisia
- Died: 3 September 2016 (aged 71)
- Education: Institut des hautes études cinématographiques
- Occupations: screenwriter, film editor, and director

Kalthoum Bornaz (24 August 1945 – 3 September 2016) was a Tunisian screenwriter, film editor, and director who belonged to the first generation of women filmmakers in Tunisia. She was born in Tunisia on 24 August 1945 and moved to France in order to continue her education abroad. She worked both in Tunisia and overseas on the development of many feature-length films as an editor and director.

== Early life and education ==
Kalthoum Bornaz was introduced to and fascinated by films since a very young age. This fascination comes from the important fact that she has parents that were really passionate of cinema. She did not follow her passion right away instead, she followed a major in Literature in Tunisia. Kalthoum Bornaz then left her home country, in order to complete her university education in France.

After her transition to France, Bornaz switched majors, and instead decided to follow cinema at the University of Paris III. She graduated in 1968 with a degree, and an expertise in film editing, script supervision, and montage from the Institut des hautes études cinématographiques situated in Paris. After the completion of her diploma, Bornaz remained in France and worked as a film technician in different programs, short films, and feature-length motion pictures.

== Career ==
Kalthoum Bornaz worked on a various number of feature-length motion pictures as a coproducer, assistant producer, film technician, and in many other fields of her expertise. She also collaborated with various producers, and filmmakers in the production of a number of films such as Claude Chabrol, Roman Polanski, Randa Chahal-Sabbag. Bornaz not only produced films in collaboration with other directors since she also worked solo in producing documentaries, short films, and feature-length motion pictures.

=== Short films ===
Kalthoum Bornaz's first film was produced in 1986, Couleurs Fertiles, it was a short film of fifteen minutes made, and released in Tunisia. After the production of her first film, Bornaz realised a set of consecutive short films the following eight years of her career: Three Characters in Search of a Theatre, The Gaze of the Seagull, Wedding Nights in Tunisia. In 2000, she produced another short film called The Forest of El Medfoun, and it was her last short film production .

=== Feature length films ===
An important year in this director's career was in 1998 when Kalthoum Bornaz directed her first feature-length film, Keswa. Keswa is a film that received a number of negative reviews because it dealt with the topic of women's right in Tunisia in a poor manner as stated by critics. Keswa was produced with the support of various production companies such as Les Films de la Mouette, which was her own production company, M.P.S. Sarim Al Fassi, and Morgane Productions. The film was not only shown in Tunisia since it was also released in various countries, and international film festivals, such as in Tübingen and Mannheim.

Her second and last feature film was The Other Half of the Sky, and it was produced in 2008 with Les Films de la Mouette, and Mille et Une Production. The Other Half of the Sky allowed Kalthoum Bornaz the opportunity to be recognized as the only female director to compete, and present her motion picture in the official competition at Television Festival and Ouagadougou’s Pan-African Film.

== Death ==
She died on September 3, 2016, from a gas explosion at her home in Mutuelleville.

== Filmography ==
Year	Title	Role
1986	Couleurs Fertiles (Fertile colors)	Screenwriter, Director & Editor
1988	Trois Personnages en Quête d'un Théâtre (Three characters in search of a theatre)	Screenwriter & Director
1992	Regard de Mouette (The Gaze of the Seagull)	Screenwriter, Director & Editor
1996	Nuit de noces a Tunis (Wedding Nights in Tunis)	Screenwriter & Director
1998	Keswa (The lost Thread)	Screenwriter, Director, & Editor
2000	La forêt d'El Medfoun (The forest of El Medfoun)	Screenwriter & Director
2008	L'autre moitié du ciel (The Other Half of the Sky)	Screenwriter & Director
