= Ayoba =

Communication platform

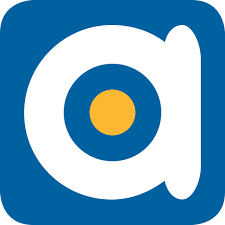
- Developer: Progressive Tech Holdings
- Type: Communication
- Website: www.ayoba.me

Ayoba is an African communication platform developed in South Africa. It is owned by Progressive Tech Holdings in Mauritius and managed by SIMFY Africa. Launched on May 4, 2019, as of April 2024, it has over 35 million active users.

== History ==
Ayoba was first published on Google Play in February 2019. Its first marketing campaign and brand launch took place in Cameroon on May 4, 2019.

In June 2019, the platform introduced its first eight channels. In November 2019, the platform reached one million active users, which increased to two million by June 2020.

Subsequently, ayoba expanded its services, including the launch of games for Android in February 2020, Momo (Mobile Money) in Cameroon in May 2020, and MicroApps in May 2020. It also launched music and voice and video calling features in 12 territories in August 2020.

The first version of ayoba for iOS was released in September 2020. In December of the same year, games and Messaging 2.0 were launched on the platform.

In November 2020, it won Best Mobile Application at the African Digital Awards.

In 2021, it won OTT Brand of the Year at the Marketing World Awards in Ghana.

In December 2022, it received Top Innovative Technology and Telecom Product of the Year at the National Communications Awards in December 2022.

In June 2023 ayoba partnered with BoomPlay and as of April 2024, it had 35 million monthly active users.

Ayoba has partnered with Jumia Ghana to offer exclusive deals to users. Ayoba users can get a 10% discount on selected Jumia purchases through the app, with no data charges for MTN users. This partnership aims to make online shopping more affordable and accessible by integrating Jumia's offers into the ayoba app. Ayoba supports over 35 million users across Africa and provides services in 22 languages. To access the deals, users can download the ayoba app from the Google Play Store, iOS Store, or the official website.

== Platform features ==
- Chat, Call and Share: ayoba enables instant messaging, voice notes, picture sharing, and file sharing with contacts, even if they do not have the app installed. The app supports voice and video calls on both Android and iOS, as well as group chats, help channel and SMS continuity (non ayoba users receive messages as SMS, their responses appear in the ayoba app).
- Music: ayoba offers a free music player with daily updates on international and African music. Users can find playlists for different genres.
- Games: ayoba provides a selection of interactive games, including action, adventure, and children's games available on both Android and iOS.
- Mobile Money Transfers: In certain territories, ayoba supports mobile money transfers using MTN Mobile Money (MoMo) for transactions within the app.
- MicroApps: ayoba features individual MicroApps within the platform that offer content and services, including streaming channels, podcasts, and specialized apps. The availability of these apps may vary by country.

== Operations ==
ayoba primarily focuses on the following territories: Nigeria, Cameroon, South Africa, Ghana, Côte d'Ivoire, Uganda, Republic of Congo, Benin, Zambia, Tanzania, Kenya, Senegal, Togo, Guinea Bissau, Guinea Conakry, Sudan, South Sudan, and Liberia. The company operates from its offices in Cape Town and Johannesburg, South Africa.

David Gillaranz served as the CEO from 2019 to 2021, and Burak Akinci has been the CEO since 2021.
