= Tamer Hosny =

Egyptian singer and actor (born 1977)

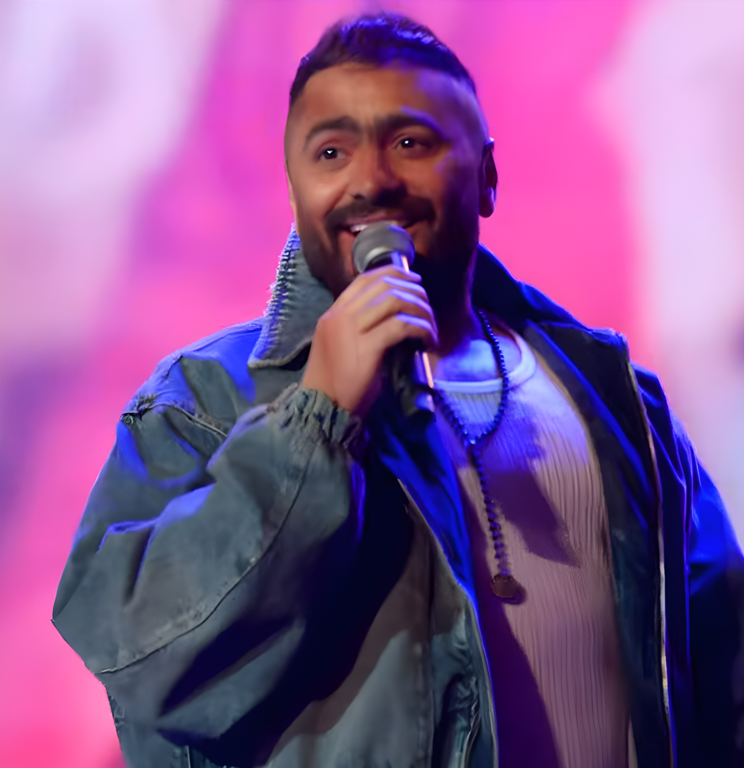
- Hosny in 2025
- Born: Tamer Hosny Sherif Abbas Farghaly تامر حسني شريف عباس; 16 August 1977 (age 49); Cairo, Egypt
- Years active: 2000–present
- Spouse: Bassma Boussel (m. 2012; div. 2023)
- Children: 3
- Musical career
- Genres: Arabic pop music, Egyptian pop, Khaliji
- Instruments: Vocals, guitar, piano, violin
- Labels: FreeMusic (former); Alam El Phan (former); Mazzika (former); Rotana Music Group (former); Tamer Hosny Production (current); Warner Music Group (current)
- Website: Tamer Hosny Production

Tamer Hosny Sherif Abbas Farghaly (Arabic: تامر حسني شريف عباس فرغلي; born 16 August 1977), known by his stage name Tamer Hosny (Arabic: تامر حسني), is an Egyptian singer and actor who first came to attention as a singer when he appeared on mixed tapes with other Egyptian artists. Hosny launched his solo career with his 2004 album Hob, becoming a successful singer of romantic music and was given the nickname "Star of the Generation" by his fans.

Tamer Hosny began his career in 2002, producing music albums and Arabic films distributed in Egypt and the Middle East. His work has accumulated 2.5 billion total views on the YouTube platform.

== Early life ==
Tamer Hosny was born in Cairo to an Egyptian father and Syrian mother. Unlike his father, Hosny Sherif Abbas, Tamer Hosny grew up with an interest in football and played the sport for five years. At age 12, Hosny got his first acting role in a 1990 short film titled Khat El Nehaya (The End Line), directed by Amr el-Leithy and co-starring Sabry Fawaz and Nashwa Mustafa.

== Music career ==
Tamer Hosny’s breakthrough came with his debut album, released in collaboration with Sherine Abdel Wahab in 2002 and produced by Nasr Mahrous. The album stood out for its distinctive sound and lyrics, appealing to young audiences by featuring two emerging singers who reflected their generation and addressed themes relevant to their lives. Its songs quickly became popular, turning both Hosny and Sherine into prominent stars almost overnight.

The album marked the beginning of Hosny’s successful music career. He went on to release nine studio albums, including ‘‘Enaya Bethabak’’ (’‘My Eyes Love You’’) in 2005, ‘‘Ha’eesh Hayaty’’ (’‘I Will Live My Life’’) in 2009, and ‘‘Bahebak Enta’’ (’‘I Love You’’) in 2013. He subsequently became one of the region’s highest-paid performers and the first Arab singer to attract more than half a million people to a single concert.

Tamer Hosny had his first directorial experience in 2010 when directing his music video "Se7eet 3la Sotha" (Woke up to her voice). Hosny had a long-held ambition to become a director and to make his own music video.

Alongside his music and acting careers, Hosny has collaborated with prominent international artists, including Quincy Jones, Snoop Dogg, and Pitbull. His collaboration with Snoop Dogg on ‘‘Si El Sayed’’ also featured the American rapper wearing a traditional Egyptian galabeya in the music video.

In 2025 he collaborated with Syrian singer Al Shami (singer) on song called Maleket Gamal El Kon which became an instant hit.

== Acting career ==
He starred in the 2003 Egyptian film Halet Hob (A State of Love).

In 2010, he released the comedy-drama film The Light of My Eyes. The movie was placed first on the Arabian box office after a week of its release.

During Ramadan 2011, Hosny starred in the television drama, Adam. Directed by Mohammad Samy, it also featured Dina Fouad, Ahmed Zaher and Mai Ezz Eldin. This series achieved big success and high views on YouTube and won the best series in 2011 in many votes. His next film Omar & Salma 3 was scheduled to release in November 2011 during the Eid al-Adha holiday.

In 2012, he released Omar & Salma 3, the third sequel to the Omar & Salma trilogy. Hosny has frequently stated that he was not satisfied with the film. In a 2016 interview on the Set El Hosn (Beautiful lady) program, he admitted that "I'm not happy with how the movie turned out, although many people love it and it was a box office success. I don't blame anyone else for that. I take responsibility for it. We had to make major plot changes due to financial reasons."

After three years away from the movie industry, he released Ahwak alongside Ghada Adel and Ahmed Malek, a romantic comedy about a young plastic surgeon who falls in love with a divorced woman. The film was a success at the box office, with total revenue of 22 million Egyptian pounds.

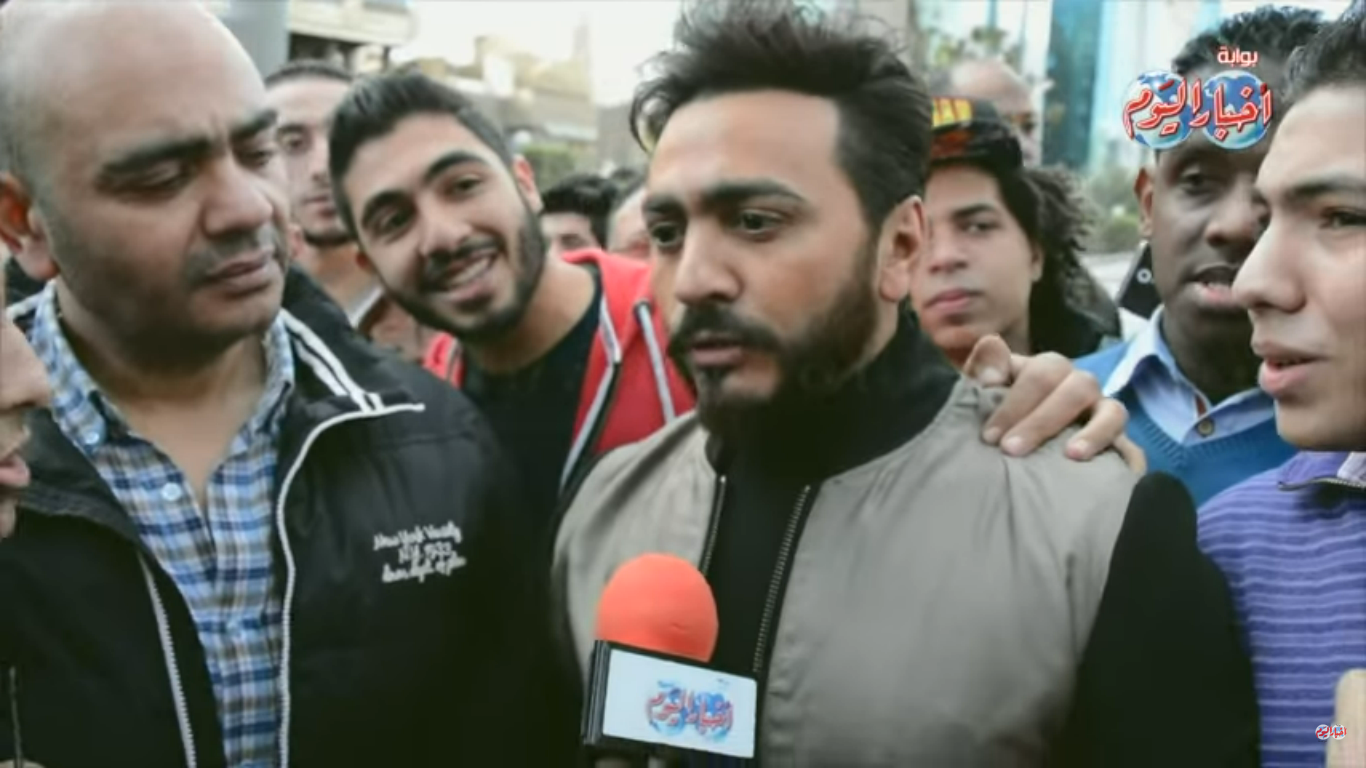
Hosny being interviewed in 2016

In 2017, Hosny released Tesbah ala Kher (Good Night), a comedy drama about a wealthy entrepreneur who has depression and hallucinations. Falcon Films – the film distributor in the Arab world – released an official statement announcing that the movie has topped the Arabic box office.

In 2018, Hosny released a new comedy El-Badlah. In 2019, Hosny released a new thriller comedy El Feloos (The Money). It grossed more than EGP 46 million in the Egyptian box office in a little over a month, while it reaped almost USD 2 million worldwide. In December 2019, Hosny broke the Guinness World Record for the most contributions to a bulletin board.

In 2021, Hosny released his new comedy-drama Mesh Ana. The film is written by Hosny, directed by Sarah Wafik, and produced by Synergy and HS production.

== Collaborations in music ==
During two years, Tamer Hosny had discovered more than 20 new talents in lyric writing and composing, over five new singers, more than ten new actors, and Mohamed Sami as a drama and cinema director (director of his series Adam).

Hosny sang vocals in Bokra "Tomorrow (A Better You, Better Me)", a charity single that was released on 11 November 2011, along with Rim Banna, Akon, Diana Karazon, Marwan Khoury, Latifa, Souad Massi, Hani Mitwasi, Saber Rebaï, Kathem Al-Saher, Waed, Sherine and other Arab Artists. Proceeds from the single were distributed to various organizations, institutions and charities with arts and culture programs. The eight-minute song was written by Majida El Roumi, and produced by Quincy Jones and RedOne.

Tamer Hosny recorded a new duet song with Shaggy, named "Smile". The song, written and composed by Tamer Hosny, was distributed all over the world. The music video was released at the beginning of 2012. It was shot in New York City and garnered more than one million views in only three days on YouTube.

In another collaboration, titled Si Al Sayed, after the patriarchal protagonist of the Cairo Trilogy, Snoop Dogg appeared in the music video wearing traditional Egyptian Jellabiya and having his name written in Arabic script.

Hosny performed "Right Where I'm Supposed to Be" as the Official Song of the 2019 Special Olympics World Summer Games in Abu Dhabi, the United Arab Emirates in collaboration with Ryan Tedder, Avril Lavigne, Luis Fonsi, Hussain Al Jassmi and Assala Nasri openly presented by public figure Hilal Al-Battashi.

== Stage and live performances ==
Because of Hosny's perceived charismatic stage presence and creativity, his fans dubbed him "King of the stage". In an interview with Sherihan Abu Al Hassan on her program Set El Hosn, Hosny said that he doesn't pay much attention to the titles given to him by fans, like "King of a generation". He appreciates the "King of the stage" title due to his efforts to improve his stage appearance in Egypt. "I'm no king, I'm not a fan of titles at all, I only appreciate the fact that my efforts to improve Egypt's stage appearance are acknowledged by the fans", he said, "My favorite title is just being called an Egyptian Arab artist when performing abroad."

== Personal life ==
In 2006, he was arrested for forging military papers to avoid military conscription. He received a one-year prison sentence, yet he only stayed in jail for six months.

Hosny married Star Academy contestant and Moroccan singer Bassma Boussel in 2012. They have two daughters and a son. On 27 April 2023, the couple announced their divorce.

He is an endorser of the soft drink Pepsi. He was also the first Arab celebrity to advertise the Police sunglasses brand.

In 2016, Tamer Hosny organized the “Pulse of Life” campaign, which set a Guinness World Record for the largest blood-donation campaign in the world. Hosny later emphasized that the record was achieved on behalf of Egypt rather than being a personal record.

On 9 August 2017, Hosny made history by being the first Egyptian/Arab artist to leave imprints of his hands and feet at the TCL Chinese Theatre in Hollywood, California. In December 2019, Tamer Hosny set a Guinness World Record for the most contributions to a bulletin board, receiving 12,086 messages from fans at Marina Mall in Abu Dhabi and surpassing the previous record of 4,900 contributions.

Tamer Hosny sparked widespread speculation about reconciling with his ex-wife, Moroccan actress Basma Bousil, after hinting on Instagram that mediation efforts were underway. While he initially dismissed rumors in a TV interview, stating, “Let us start the new year with prayers, not rumors”

== Awards ==
Hosny won many awards, such as Best Selling Album in 2002 from the Nile Variety channel, Best African Artist award in 2010, Best Arab Artist at Murex D’Or in 2014 and 2016, 2018 and Best Arab Artist at the Middle East Music Awards in 2015, Best Artist in Middle East - 2009. He is also the first Arab artist to receive more than 100 million views on Anghami.

== Discography ==
Year	Album	Production company
2004	Love (Hob)	Free Music "Nasr Mahrous"
2006	My eyes love you (Enayyah Bethebbak)	Free Music "Nasr Mahrous"
2007	Ya Bent El-Eih	Free Music "Nasr Mahrous"
2007	Heaven is in our homes (El Gana Fi Byotna)	Free Music "Nasr Mahrous"
2008	Come closer more (Arrab Kaman)	Free Music "Nasr Mahrous"
2009	I will live my life (Ha'esh Hayaty)	Mazzika
2010	I chose right (Ikhtart Sah)	Mazzika
2011	What's coming is better (Elly Gai Ahla)	Mazzika
2013	I love you (Bahebak Enta)	Free Music "Nasr Mahrous"
2014	180°	Rotana
2016	My life has begun (Omry Ibatda)	Rotana
2018	Live like you want (Eish Beshoqak)	Tamer Hosny Production
2020	Stay steely (Khaleek Fulazy)	Rotana
2022	Aashaangy	Rotana
2024	Happiness hormone (Hormone Al Saada)	Tamer Hosny Production
2025	Lena Moad	Tamer Hosny Production
2026	Mesh Hatkarar	Tamer Hosny Production

In addition to:

- Free Mix 2000 (2000)
- Free Mix 3 (2002)
- Free Mix 4 (2005)

== Series ==
- "Adam" (2011)
- "Faraq Al-taw'eet" (2014)
- "My Way" (2015)
- "Weld El Ghalaba" (2020) Mahmoud Shalaby (Guest of Honor)

== Filmography ==
- State of Love (Halet Hob) (2004)
- Sayed el Atefy (2005)
- Omar & Salma (2007)
- Captain Hima (2008)
- Omar & Salma 2 (2009)
- The Light of My Eyes (Nour Einy) (2010)
- Omar & Salma 3 (2012)
- I Adore You (Ahwak) (2015)
- Good Night (Tisbah Ala Khair) (2017)
- The Suit (El Badla) (2018)
- The Money (El Felous) (2019)
- Not Me (Mesh Ana) (2021)
- I Love You (Bahbk) (2022)
- TAG (2023)
- Restart (2025)
