= Forbidden Love (2011 TV series) =

2011 Syrian television program

- Written by: Tamer Issac; Bashar Boutros
- Directed by: Tamer Isaac
- Country of origin: Syria

Forbidden Love is a Syrian television series which was first aired in 2011. The program, which is broadcast via satellite, has caused controversy across Arabic communities for its exploration of issues considered socially and culturally taboo. Written and directed by Tamer Isaac, the drama features a cast including Abbas al-Noury, Kinda Alloush, Basim Yakhour, Qusai Khouli and Salma Masri.

== Cast ==
- Abbas al-Noury as Dr. Wael: Dr. Wael is a complex man who is employed at the University of Damascus' Faculty of Architecture. He has an adopted daughter Sarah, with whom he has a complex relationship. Like many of the characters in the series, Dr. Wael is challenged by the values and customs of the culture he lives in.
- Basim Yakhour as Samir: Samir is an artist who is responsible for the care of his disabled brother. In caring for his brother, Samir's values and morality are challenged. Samir is highly ambitious, he works at an insurance company where he engages in illegal business dealings to fulfill his desire for wealth.
- Qusai Khouli as Yazan: Yazan is a blind artist with a generous, loving and mild-mannered personality. He refuses to let his disability restrict his lifestyle or affect his relationships with others. The emotional impact of his mother's death during his childhood resulted in a strong commitment to his family and a deep concern for others. His humility and empathy are recognized by many and he is consequently highly regarded within the community. He has a deeply compassionate friendship with Salim, a young man living with cerebral palsy. As a result of their close friendship, Salim donates one of his corneas to Yazan so that Yazan can regain his sight.
- Kinda Alloush as Sarah: Sarah is a young woman who was adopted by Dr. Wael. She is a student at the Faculty of Architecture, with a spontaneous nature. Her spontaneous decisions and behavior are often misinterpreted or misunderstood.
- Salma Masri as Amal: Amal is an older woman who struggles to maintain emotional well-being. She instigates a relationship with a man 20 years younger than herself; however, due to her complex emotional state, the relationship is fraught with difficulties. Amal's younger lover is overwhelmed by her emotional needs, and begins a relationship with Alma's niece, who is his age.
- Hiba Noor as Ameera: Ameera is a young woman who conforms to social and cultural norms, but is challenged by the behavior and actions of those around her. She is burdened with problems including a brother with a disability, a husband who she suspects is unfaithful, and a mother-in-law who does not care for her.
- Saad Minh as Shaher: Shaher is a young character who, like many of the young characters in the program, often challenges the social and cultural norms of the society she lives within. Shaher often engages in behavior considered culturally taboo and has a resultant colorful reputation.
- Lilia al-Atrash as Salma: Salma is a young woman who is learning to live with difficulties. She is challenged by the contradictions in her society and culture, which is reflected in her behavior. Salma experienced life-changing events that were difficult to overcome and influenced the development of her character. Subsequently, she has negative and positive personality traits.
- Yamen Al Hajaly as Salem: Salim is a twenty-year-old male affected by the first phase of cerebral palsy. His mother and father no longer live with his family, and in the absence of his parents, he is cared for by his brother and sister. One of the aims of the Forbidden Love series is to highlight the impact of cerebral palsy on people who live with the disease.
- Lena Diab as Lena: Lina is a young woman who has married an older man, Assad, for his wealth. The re-appearance of her former lover emotionally challenges her and impacts her marriage.
- Khaled Taja as Assad
- Slim Kallas as Abu Shaher
- Lama Ibrahim as Manal
- Myrna Shalfon as Reem
- Ahmad Harhash as Ghalib

== Themes ==
Forbidden Love is a serial drama which focuses on social issues in contemporary Syrian society. The series primarily explores the impact of adoption, disability and unconventional relationships within families and communities. These themes had never previously been explored within a Syrian television drama.

The romantic themes within Forbidden Love are highly contentious to Syrian culture and religion. The most controversial storyline in the series involves the complex relationship between the series’ two protagonists, Sarah (an adopted daughter) and Dr. Wael (her adoptive father). The series explores the reactions of community and kin to this relationship, and depicts the moral dilemmas of characters in deciding whether to condone or condemn the relationship.

The series also involves depictions of adultery, greed, manipulation, illegal business dealings and a relationship between characters where a significant age disparity exists.

== Production ==
Forbidden Love began shooting in mid-March 2011, inadvertently coinciding with the start of the "Arab Spring" protests. Many production companies declined the option to finance the series, as they were nervous about the Syrian political situation disrupting the shooting. However, Golden Line agreed to the project, aspiring to be a Syrian company capable of delivering a reliable commodity in the midst of political turmoil. As of April 2012, Forbidden Love has been filmed amongst neighborhoods in Damascus and Ghouta without incident.

To attract a maximum viewing audience, the series premiered during Ramadan 2011.

=== Broadcast on satellite channels ===
- Infinity Channel
- Infinity 2 Channel
- Amwaj Channel
- Majan Channel
- Syria Drama Channel
- New TV Channel
- Arabia Drama Channel

== Reception ==
Since premiering in September 2011, The Forbidden Love series has broadcast continually to Arabic speaking communities across the Middle East, despite the program causing controversy amongst some sections of the community. Primarily, the series has provoked criticism in the Arabic language press, including e-Sama Syria, a Syrian newspaper; October, a Syrian art magazine; and Al Itthihad, a newspaper printed in the United Arab Emirates. The series explores a number of subjects, including incest, which are highly taboo in Arabic culture. Critics of the series have accused it of "unraveling morality" and have demanded an end to the program. The campaign against the series has also involved threats to prosecute the satellite channels which broadcast the program. However, the series has a strong fan base, which was apparent within 10 days of the program being launched when it attracted over 80,000 YouTube downloads.

Social networking sites have provided fertile ground for supporters and opponents of the series to promote their perceptions of the program's values. These sites have also provided a space for supporters and opponents to engage in dialogue about the program, and to explore the culturally acceptable limits of popular media in highlighting and challenging cultural taboos. As incest is such an emotive and taboo topic in many cultures, including Arab cultures, many people have been confronted by the series' exploration of this issue. Consequently, there have been a high number of sharp attacks on the program and its cast through social networking sites.
