= Omar & Salma =

- Poster for Omar & Salma
- Arabic: عمر وسلمى (Omar We Salma)
- Directed by: Akram Farid
- Written by: Tamer Hosny, Ahmed Abdel Fattah
- Story by: Tamer Hosny
- Produced by: Mohammad El-Sobki
- Starring: Tamer Hosny, Mai Ezz Eldin, Mais Hamdan
- Production companies: Rotana Studios, El-Sobki Film Production
- Distributed by: Al Arabia Cinema Production & Distribution, Rotana Studios, El-Sobki Film Production
- Release date: 6 June 2007
- Country: Egypt
- Language: Arabic

Omar & Salma (Arabic: عمر وسلمى) is an Egyptian comedy, drama film starring Tamer Hosny and Mai Ezz Eldin, written by Hosny. It was the first of a trilogy.
