= MAD Solutions =

Music distribution company in Nigeria

- Founded: May 2017; 9 years ago in Lagos, Nigeria
- Founder: Bugwu Aneto-Okeke
- Fate: Active
- Headquarters: Houston, Texas, United States
- Website: madsolutions.ai

Measurable Accurate Digital Solutions (doing business as M.A.D Solutions) is a Nigerian music distribution company founded in 2017 by Bugwu Aneto-Okeke.

== History ==
M.A.D Solutions was established by Bugwu Aneto-Okeke in May 2017 in Lagos and started off by securing licensing agreements with Apple Music and YouTube. Aneto-Okeke then partnered with Merlin to explore more licensing rights. In 2021, the headquarters were moved to Houston, Texas.

M.A.D Solutions distributes contents using digital service providers (DSPs) such as Spotify, Boomplay, Ayoba, Audiomack, Triller, and TikTok.

As of 2023 M.A.D. Solutions had amassed over 9 billion streams across its DSPs.

== Services ==
M.A.D Solutions distributes audio and video contents in over 45 distributions services across different genres.

Through ENGAGE, a record label and subsidiary of MAD Solutions, through a partnership with Chordcash and Artsplit, MAD Solutions allows fans to support their artist. Engage as a record label and talent incubator offer a 360 label service to artist.

M.A.D Solutions distributes music for Afrobeats artists such as Runtown, Phyno, Flavour, Ric Hassani, Simi and Nigerian gospel artists such as Mercy Chinwo and Moses Bliss.
