= Messages from the Sea =

2010 film

- Film poster
- Directed by: Daoud Abdel Sayed
- Written by: Daoud Abdel Sayed
- Produced by: Isaad Younis
- Starring: Asser Yassin; Basma Ahmed
- Cinematography: Ahmed el Morsy
- Edited by: Mona Rabie
- Distributed by: Rotana Studios
- Release date: 8 October 2010 (Hamburg Film Festival)
- Running time: 133 minutes
- Country: Egypt
- Language: Egyptian Arabic

Messages from the Sea (Arabic: رسائل البحر, translit. Rassayel El Bahr) is a 2010 Egyptian drama film directed by Daoud Abdel Sayed. The film was selected as the Egyptian entry for the Best Foreign Language Film at the 83rd Academy Awards, but it did not make the final shortlist.

== Cast ==
- Asser Yassin as Yehia
- Basma as Nora
- Sam Habib as David
- Salah Abdallah as Hajj Hashim
- Samia Asaad as Carla
- Doaa Hegazy as Riham
- Ahmed Kamal
- May Kassab as Besa
- Mohamed Lotfy as Abeel

== See also ==
- List of submissions to the 83rd Academy Awards for Best Foreign Language Film
- List of Egyptian submissions for the Academy Award for Best Foreign Language Film
