= Kinda Alloush =

Syrian actress (born 1982)

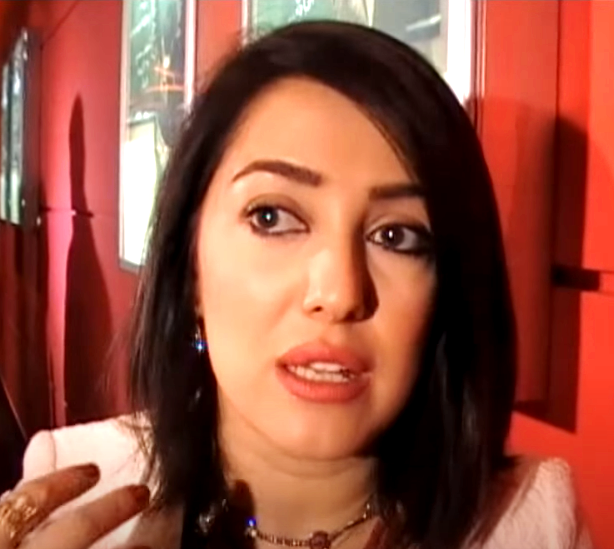
- Kinda Alloush
- Born: Kinda Mazen Alloush; March 27, 1982 (age 44); Hama, Syria
- Occupation: Actress
- Years active: 2004-present
- Spouses: Fares Al-Thahabi (m. 2008; div. 2015) Amr Youssef (m. 2017)
- Children: 2

Kinda Mazen Alloush (Arabic: كندة مازن علوش; born on 27 March 1982 in Hama) is a Syrian actress known for her roles in Syrian and Egyptian drama and cinema.

== Early life and career ==
Alloush was born in Hama, Syria to a father who was a physician and mother who was an engineer. She studied French literature, then theater criticism at the Higher Institute for Dramatic Arts in Damascus. Alloush worked as an author and assistant director. Her first role was in Ashwak Naiema series with Rasha Shurbatji in 2004. Alloush has also acted in many Egyptian drama series such as Dalaa Albanat in 2014, as well as in Egyptian films such as 33 Days (2013), Excuse My French (2014), and Hepta (2016).

== Personal life ==
In 2008, Alloush married Syrian scriptwriter Fares Al-Thahabi. The couple divorced in April 2016. That same year in November, she married Egyptian actor Amr Youssef. The couple celebrated their wedding in January 2017. She gave birth to her first daughter Hayat in November 2018.

Alloush is known for supporting the Syrian Revolution since 2011. She signed on what was known as the "Milk Statement" in April 2011; the statement demanded the delivery of humanitarian aid including food, medicine, and milk to the children of Daraa, which was besieged by government forces. She criticized First Lady of Syria Asma al-Assad for not standing with mothers of victims of the Syrian regime.

She has resided in Egypt since 2011.

== Works ==
=== Series ===
- Sleep thorns (2005)
- Nazar Qabani (2005)
- Baibars (2005)
- Woman Shadow (2005)
- Hasiba (2006)
- Sultana (2007)
- Another Dawn (2007)
- The Invasion (2007)
- Like that we married (2008)
- Another raining day (2008)
- Light spot (2008)
- Soft Silleness (2009)
- The struggle of money (2009)
- Wanted men (2010)
- People of Cairo (2011)
- Forbidden Love (2011)
- Birth from side (2011)
- In The palm of demon (2012)
- The Naughty (2012)
- Daughters of Family (2012)
- The Bats (2013)
- Friendly fires (2013)
- Sanaoud Baad Kalil (2013)
- The seven commandments (2014)
- Countdown (2014)
- Readness of Girls (2014)
- Steva (2015)
- Teen Wolf (2015)
- Joys of the Dome (2016)
- Stone of Hell (2017)
- Tom and Sherry (2017)
- People of love 3 (2017)
- Ekhwati (2025)

=== Films ===
- Passion (2007)
- Escaping Tel Aviv (2009)
- A whole one (2011)
- El-Fagommi (2011)
- Bartita (2012)
- The Benefit (2012)
- 33 days (2012)
- Excuse My French (2014)
- At Cairo time (2015)
- Hepta (2016)
- The Originals (2017)
- The Swimmers (2022)
- Nezouh (2022)
