= Ali, the Goat and Ibrahim =

2016 film

- Theatrical release poster
- Directed by: Sherif El Bendary
- Screenplay by: Ahmed Amer
- Story by: Ibrahim El Batout
- Produced by: Mohamed Hefzy; Hossam Elouan
- Starring: Ali Subhi; Ahmed Magdy; Salwa Mohamed Ali; Nahed El Sebai; Ibrahim Ghareib
- Cinematography: Amr Farouk
- Edited by: Emad Maher
- Music by: Ahmed El Sawy
- Production companies: Transit Films; Rotana TV & Distribution; Film Clinic; Arizona Productions
- Distributed by: Rotana Studios
- Release date: 12 December 2016 (Dubai International Film Festival)
- Running time: 92 minutes
- Countries: Egypt; France; Qatar; United Arab Emirates; Germany
- Language: Arabic

Ali, the Goat and Ibrahim (Arabic: علي معزة وابراهيم, transliterated: Ali Mizah wa Ibrahim) is a 2016 Egyptian film directed by Sherif El Bendary.

== Plot ==
Ali believes his late girlfriend's soul has been reincarnated in a goat named Nada. Ali, his goat and his friend Ibrahim embark on a journey of friendship and self-discovery across Egypt to reverse the curse.

== Cast ==
- Ali Subhi – Ali
- Ahmed Magdy – Ibrahim
- Salwa Mohamed Ali – Nousa
- Nahed El Sebai – Sabah
- Ibrahim Ghareib – The train collector

== Reception ==
The film was dubbed "a weirdly likable firecracker" in a review in The Hollywood Reporter. It received a mostly positive review in the Variety. It won the award for Best feature film at the 2017 Malmö Arab Film Festival.

== Awards ==
- Best Feature Film, Malmö Arab Film Festival
- Best Actor, Dubai International Film Festival
