= Adiós Carmen =

- Directed by: Mohamed Amin Benamraoui
- Release date: 2013
- Country: Morocco
- Language: Berber (Tamazight)

Adiós Carmen is a 2013 film by Mohamed Amin Benamraoui, and the first in the Berber (Tamazight) language, though it also includes some Arabic, Spanish, and French. Set in the Rif region of northern Morocco in 1975, the film tells the story of 10-year-old Amar and his interactions with a Spanish refugee named Carmen, who introduces him to film. Adiós Carmen won the Prix du Public at the 14th Mediterranean Film Festival in Brussels in 2014, and the "Muhr Arab Special Mention" and the best feature in the Dubai International Film Festival 2013.

== Plot ==
After Amar's widowed mother leaves him to remarry in Belgium, he searches for someone to care for him while living with his violent, drunk uncle and awaiting his mother's return. His neighbor Carmen, meanwhile, works as an usher in the village cinema and takes Amar there after becoming worried about the loneliness and bullying he faces. Amar becomes fascinated with film despite understanding little of the language and returns home singing a song from the film. Soon Amar becomes a messenger for the love letters exchanged between Carmen and a man who repairs bicycles, but one day Amar's uncle finds a letter in Amar's pocket before he has a chance to deliver it, becomes angry, and threatens him. Although Amar's house remains filled with domestic violence, he is becoming closer friends with other boys, and tries to learn how to fight. When the news of Franco's death Carmen and her brother, she declares that she does not wish to return to Spain and live like their mother. Carmen's boyfriend reads her latest letter and angrily tells Amar to tell Carmen that their relationship is over and he is getting married. From then on, Carmen becomes more withdrawn and eventually decides to return to Spain. Nevertheless, Amar's life begins to improve: his abusive uncle is sentenced to two and a half years in jail, he makes a rudimentary movie projector at home, and he is reunited with his mother.
