= Mahmoud Ben Mahmoud =

Tunisian film writer and producer

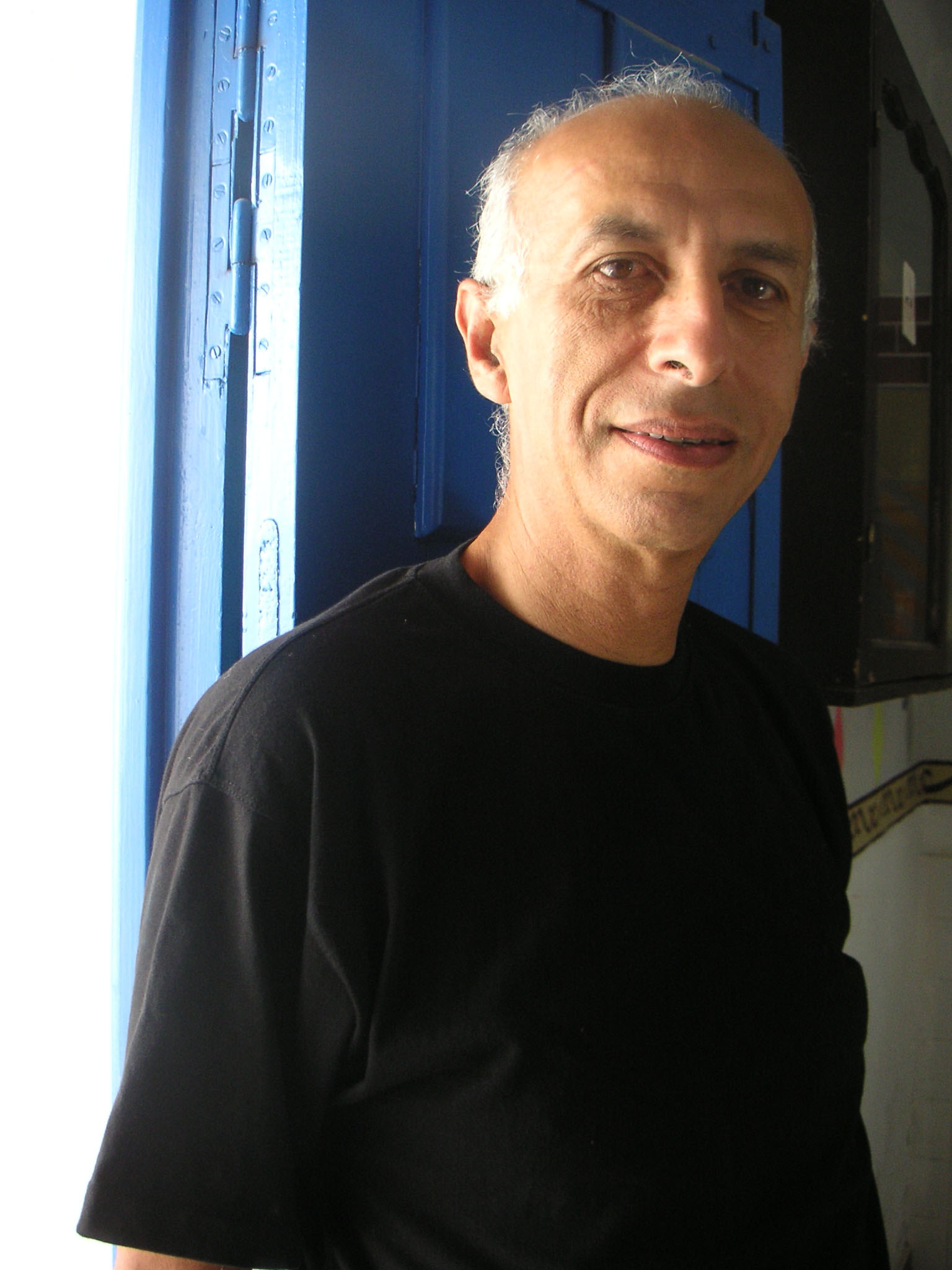
- Born: 1947 (age 77–78); Tunis, Tunisia
- Education: art history, archeology and journalism, Free University of Brussels.
- Alma mater: Free University of Brussels
- Occupation: Film writer . Producer

Mahmoud Ben Mahmoud (born in 1947) is a Tunisian film writer and producer.

== Biography ==
Mahmoud was born in 1947 in Tunis, Tunisia, to a family of Turkish origin who had settled in Tunisia in 1710. His father was a theologian and amateur artist and writer, which, to an extent, influenced the personality of the young Mahmoud. He studied at the INSAS Belgian school of cinema where he completed his graduation in field of filming. Later, he studied art history, archeology and journalism at the Free University of Brussels (ULB). These multidisciplinary studies gave him a solid training to face the field of cinema.

He first tried to make it as a film writer by participating in the writing of two films: The Son of Amr's death (Le Fils d'Amr est mort) of Jean-Jacques Andrien and Kfar Kassem of Borhane Alaoui. Soon after, Mahmoud made his first feature film Crossings (Traversées) in 1982. His second feature film, released in 1992, Chichkhan, Diamond Dust (Chichkhan, poussière de diamant) was selected for Directors' Fortnight at the Cannes Film Festival. Mahmoud has also released a number of documentary films between 1992 and 2006, such as: Italiani dell'altra riva (1992), Anastasia de Bizerte (1996), Albert Samama-Chikli (1996), Ennejma Ezzahra (1998), The Thousand and One Voices (2001), Fadhel Jaibi, a Theatre in Freedom (2003) and The Beys of Tunis, a colonial monarchy in turmoil (Les Beys de Tunis, une monarchie dans la tourmente)(2006). Meanwhile, he has still continued to make films that have marked his film career success, such as Naps grenadines which was released in 2003.
