= Ramy Sabry (singer) =

Egyptian singer (born 1978)

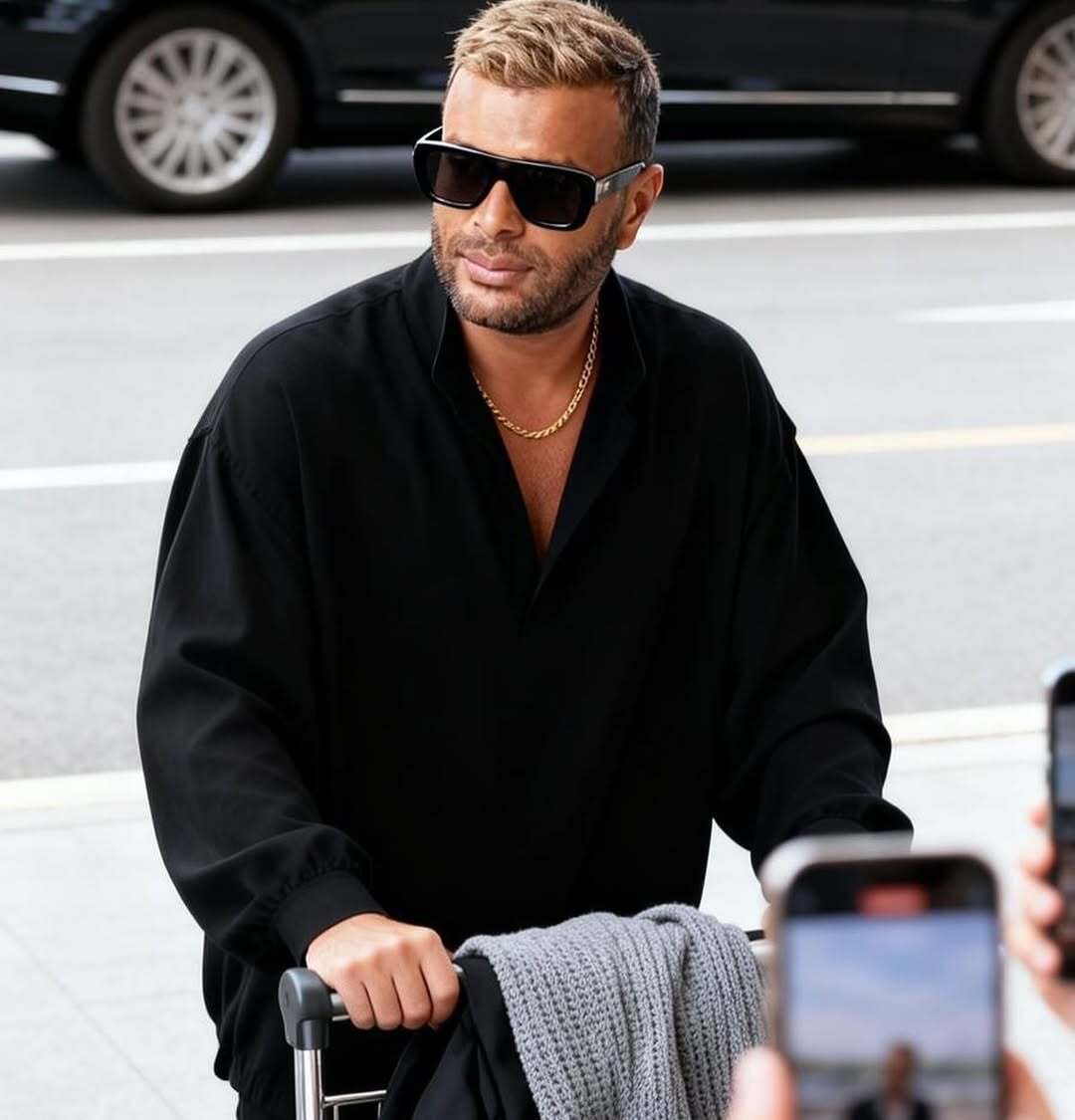
- Ramy Sabry in 2026

Background information
- Born: Ramy Sabry Mahmoud Mohamed رامي صبري محمود محمد; March 15, 1978 (age 47); Cairo, Egypt
- Occupations: Singer, actor
- Instruments: Guitar, piano
- Years active: 2006–present
- Labels: Rotana Records; Nogoum Records; Mazika

Ramy Sabry (Arabic: رامي صبري; also spelt Rami Sabry; born 15 March 1978) is an Egyptian singer and actor.In 2024, he was featured on ETOLUBOV's neo-pop track, "Attraction" from the album VSELUBOV.

== Discography ==
- 2006: Habibi Al Awalany
- 2008: Ghammadt Einy
- 2013: Wana Maah
- 2015: Agmal Layaly Omry
- 2017: Al Ragel
- 2019: Fare2 Ma3ak
- 2022: Ma3aya Hatbda3
- 2024: El Nehayet Akhlaa
- 2024: Ana Gamed Keda Keda
- 2025: Ana Bahebak Enta

=== Charted songs ===
Title	Year	Peak chart position				Album
Title	Year	EGY	LBN	MENA	KSA	Album
"Ymken Kher"	2022	9	17	1	7	Ma3aya Hatbda3
