= Daoud Abdel Sayed =

Egyptian director and screenwriter (1946–2025)

- داود عبد السيد
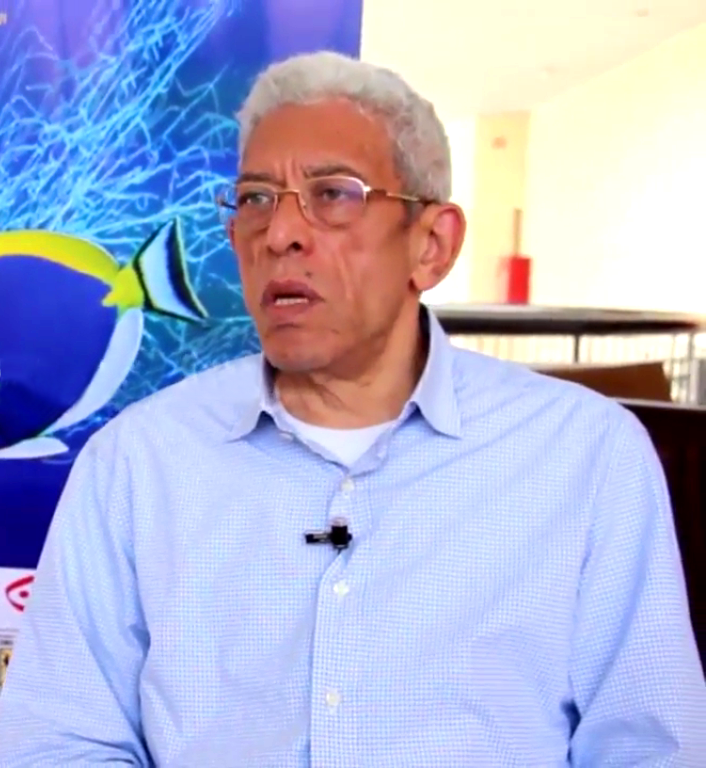
- Daoud Abdel Sayed in 2017
- Born: 23 November 1946; Cairo, Kingdom of Egypt
- Died: 27 December 2025 (aged 79)
- Citizenship: Egyptian
- Occupations: director and screenwriter
- Notable work: Kit Kat

Daoud Abdel Sayed (Arabic: داود عبد السيد pronounced [dæˈwuːd ʕæbdesˈsæjjed]; 23 November 1946 – 27 December 2025) was an Egyptian film director and screenwriter. He started as the assistant of Youssef Chahine in The Land. Sayed made several critically acclaimed films, and won several international awards notably for The Land of Fear which was produced in 1999.

== Early life ==
Daoud Abdel Sayed was born into a middle-class Coptic family in Cairo, Egypt, Abd El-Sayed graduated in 1967 from the Higher Institute of Cinema in Cairo as a film director. Daoud Abdel Sayed started his career working as an assistant director in important movies such as “Al Ard” by Youssef Chahine, “Al Ragol Al Lazy Faqad Zaloh” by Kamal El Sheikh and “Awham El Hob”. However, he found that the job of assistant director was not for him as he had higher ambitions such as directing and producing his own movies: “This job is not for me because it needs a lot of focus, something that I simply do not have”.

That is why he chose to film several documentaries in order to depict the daily agonies of the Egyptian society such as “On the people and prophets” produced in 1980 and “Working in the field” produced in 1979. Those documentaries gave Daoud Abdel Sayed the opportunity to mingle with the Egyptian mainstream society and deepen his knowledge about the different social classes that compose the Egyptian society. All those factors deeply affected his film making later on in his life.

== New Realism ==
Daoud Abdel Sayed is referred to one of the pioneers of a school of thought in Egyptian cinema called “New Realism”. According to Viola Shafik, professor at the American University in Cairo and author of Arab Cinema: history and cultural identity, New Realism appeared in the 1980s as a revival of the wave of realism that had dominated Egyptian cinema in the 1960s. The rise of the original realism in the 1950s called for filmmaking that reflected the daily life of the indigenous Egyptian population, paying attention to the choice of the “simple man” from the lower social class and portraying him as the protagonist. New Realism in turn, called essentially for the same thing but using different mechanisms of action and police film rather than melodrama.

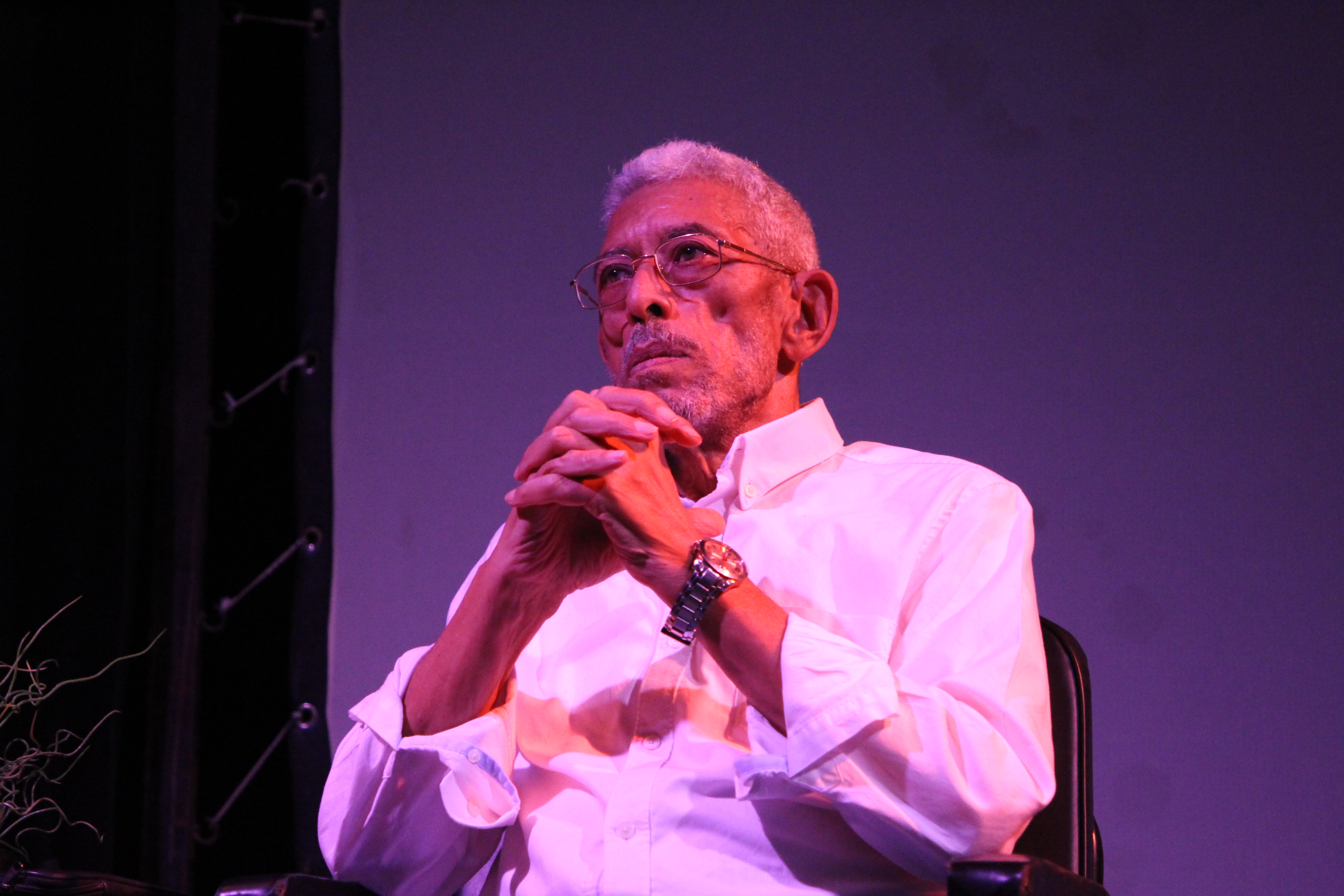
Daoud Abdel Sayed in 2019

Daoud Abdel Sayed films not only attempt to portray the realistic existence of the indigenous Egyptian peoples, it also attempts to show how their reality is undergoes processes of change. Daoud Abdel Sayed's "The Search for Sayid Marzuq" is a police film that attempts to look at the issue of citizenship as "measured along the malfunctions of the modern nation-state". A newsletter article of the Middle East Studies Program issued by the American University in Cairo tells the story of the film and alludes to the fact that Daoud Abdel Sayed is arguing, through the hero's eyes, that reality has changed since the early 1970s as a result of the pressure imposed on countries such as Egypt to “modernise.” The account of the film in this publication reads as follows: Yusuf, a bachelor and white-collar wakes up late one day and rushes to work only to find out that it is a holiday. The last twenty years he had hardly been out and spends the day drifting. He meets different odd people, among others an organ grinder, a mysterious young woman, a prostitute and last not least, Sayyid Marzuq, a rich business man who invites him in order to tell him his story. In the evening Marzuq asks Yusuf to look after his expensive car for a moment. A while later the police arrive and accuse the protagonist of being a thief. Since that moment Yusuf flees through the city with the police in hot pursuit, who does not stop chasing him even after the car's owner has been found and the error cleared up. The chase lasts a whole exhausting night and has no logical explanation, the same applies to Yusuf's antipode, Marzuq, who appears and disappears frequently, comforts him but leaves him a short while later to his pursuers. If we believe the hero's perception since the early 1970s, reality has changed basically. Events and people became absurd, arbitrary and unpredictable, whereas an omnipresent and unreasonable police apparatus controls life.

== Death ==
Daoud Abdel Sayed died on 27 December 2025, at the age of 79.

== Awards and nominations ==
Abd El-Sayed received a number of national and international awards: best director for ‘al-Kit-Kat’ at the Biennale des Cinémas Arabes in Paris and the Damascus International Film Festival in 1992, the Silver Pyramid at the International Cairo International Film Festival for his film ‘Searching for Sayyid Marzuq’ (1991) and the Silver Pyramid and the best script award at the same festival for his film ‘Land of Fear’ (1999).

Following his international achievements and recognitions he became a member of the Higher Film Festival Commission and the Higher Council of Culture in Egypt. He assisted in several film festivals as a jury notably in the 8th Biennale of Arab Cinemas in Paris (Institut du Monde Arabe).

His 2010 film Messages from the Sea was selected as the Egyptian entry for the Best Foreign Language Film at the 83rd Academy Awards, but it didn't make the final shortlist.

== Filmography ==
- The advice of a wise man on the affairs of the village and education (1975)
- Working in the field (1979)
- On people, prophets and artists (1980)
- The Vagabonds (1985)
- Looking for Sayed Marzouk (1990)
- Kit Kat (1991)
- Land of Dreams (1993)
- The Stolen joy (1994)
- Land of Fear (1999)
- A Citizen, a Detective and a Thief (2001)
- Messages from the Sea (2010)
- Extraordinary Abilities (2015)
