= Wissam Smayra =

Lebanese filmmaker

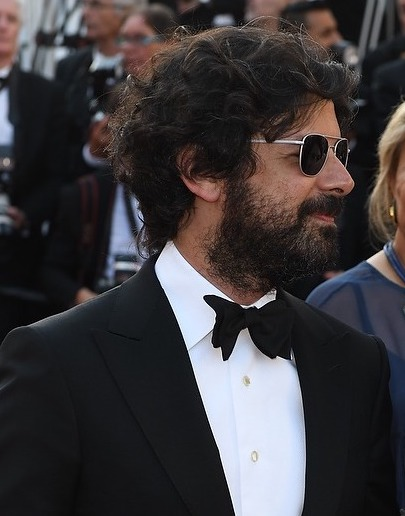
- Wissam Smayra on the red carpet at the Cannes Film Festival (2018)
- Born: Wissam Smayra; April 8, 1974 (age 51); Beirut, Lebanon
- Occupations: Director; screenwriter; producer
- Years active: 2003–present
- Parent(s): Alexandre Smayra; Carmen Smayra

Wissam Smayra (/smeɪrə/; born April 8, 1974) is a Lebanese film director, screenwriter, and producer. He is known for directing the comedy-drama film Perfect Strangers (2022), as well as being an executive producer on Academy Award for Best Foreign Film nominated Capernaum (2018).

== Early life ==
Wissam Smayra was born in Beirut, Lebanon on April 8, 1974. His formative years were defined by the harsh realities of conflict as he grew up in war-ravaged neighborhoods. His family home became a casualty of bombings, shaping the backdrop of his upbringing. These turbulent experiences during the war laid the groundwork for his resilience and artistic inclination. Despite the adversity, he found solace in storytelling, a coping mechanism that would ultimately pave the way for his future career as a prolific and diversified director.

== Career ==
=== TV Commercials ===
After completing his studies in film in Beirut, Smayra began his career in the advertising industry. He initially served as a creative director for Beirut-based agencies overseeing projects in the MENA region before transitioning into directing his own advertisements. This unveiled his distinctive style and innovative approach, as he soared to become one of the most prolific ad directors in the region with over 700 TV commercials since 2001. Smayra is credited in the industry with having paved the way for a new generation of Lebanese and Arab commercial directors. His work garnered numerous accolades at prestigious events including Cannes Lions, the Epica Awards, and Dubai Lynx, consolidating his standing as an eminent figure in the industry.

Smayra collaborated with prominent brands such as Vodafone, Pepsi-Cola, Garnier - L'Oréal, and Cartier. These campaigns featured notable personalities such as Tunisian-Egyptian actress Hend Sabry, Egyptian actress Menna Shalabi, Egyptian model-actress Tara Emad, Lebanese actress Razane Jammal, Egyptian football player Mohamed Aboutrika, Egyptian musician Tamer Hosny, Lebanese singer and actress Myriam Fares, Egyptian actor Hussein Fahmy, Moroccan football player Abdeslam Ouaddou, among others.

In 2023, Smayra directed the holy Ramadan advertising campaign for Cartier, featuring Tunisian-Egyptian actress Hend Sabry, Tunisian actor Dhafer L'Abidine, Egyptian model-actress Tara Emad, Egyptian actor Ahmed Malek and entrepreneur Anas Bukhash.

=== Music Videos ===
Smayra has directed music videos for various artists, including Ragheb Alama and Jean-Jacques Goldman.

In 2004, Smayra initiated his collaboration with Lebanese singer Joe Ashkar, working together on two music videos. His talent quickly captured the attention of the acclaimed Lebanese singer Ragheb Alama. He directed his major hit "Nasīni El Donya نسينى الدنيا" (trans: "Make Me Forget the World"). Shot in Milan and produced by Khodr Alama and Anne-Valerie Lahoud, Ragheb Alama played himself alongside then-debuting Paraguayan model Claudia Galanti. The video, featuring the launch of Mercedes Benz's new CLS model for the Middle East, garnered even more attention after a significant launch event later that year. Today, the song is considered a classic and though it was released on TV, still managed to amass over 82 million views on YouTube and 18 million streams on Anghami ten years after its initial release.

A few months later, Smayra directed the music video for "El Hobb El Kebir الحب الكبير" (trans: The Great Love), featuring Brazilian model Rosana de Souza. Released in 2005, the song became another hit accumulating over 32 million views on YouTube more than ten years after its initial release.

In 2012, Smayra directed "Habeeb Dehkāty حبيب ضحكاتي" (trans: "The Love of my Laughs"), which was filmed during the artist's French tour. The video was shot at the Olympia Theater and the Peninsula Hotel in Paris and features the French actress Sarah Darmon.

Smayra directed the music video to Myriam Fares's song "Haklak Rahtak حقلق راحتك" (trans: "I Will Disturb Your Comfort") in 2006 in Paris starring French actor Lannick Gautry.

That same year, Smayra also directed Fares's "Waheshni Eih وحشني ايه" (trans: "How Come I miss you") shot in Beirut one week before the 2006 Lebanon War. The video, featuring car chases in the city, was released later that year and achieved wide success.

In 2007, Smayra directed the music video for "4 Mots sur un piano," a composition by Jean-Jacques Goldman.

In France, the single entered the charts directly at number 5 on July 28, 2007, and quickly ascended to the top spot just two weeks later, recording approximately 17,000 copies sold during that week. It maintained its number one position for two consecutive weeks. Following that, it gradually descended but still sustained a notable presence, spending a total of 17 weeks in the top ten, 24 weeks in the top 50, and 32 weeks in the top 100. Certified Silver disc three months after its release by the SNEP for about 175,000 sales, it was the fifth best-selling single of 2007 in France (163,179 were sold in 2007). It was the second number-one single for Patrick Fiori (after "Belle" in 1998), and also for Jean-Jacques Goldman (after "Je te donne" in 1986).

In Belgium, the single spent 19 weeks in the top 40. Initially entering the chart at a lower position, it gradually climbed to its highest peak of number seven in its eighth week. The single secured the 60th position on the year-end chart for Belgium in 2007.

In Switzerland, the single reached number 67 in the Singles Chart on 26 August 2008, and reached number 40 two weeks later.

In 2008, Smayra collaborated with Moroccan singer Sofia El Marikh on "Is2alni Ana اسألني أنا" (trans: "Ask me") shot in Beirut. One year later, Smayra directed "Tahwak تهواك" (trans: "...who loves you"), Sofia's cover for Woman in Love, shot in Paris, France.

=== Short films ===
Besides his early shorts at film school, Smayra embarked in 2003 on his filmmaking journey by co-writing and directing the short film "Non métrage libanais" in collaboration with Ghassan Koteit. This fresh and original endeavor garnered acclaim at numerous international film festivals, solidifying Smayra's style and tone in the film community. "Non métrage libanais" stands as a poignant tribute to Lebanese cinema, with a distinctive feature - all roles in the film were portrayed by individuals deeply entrenched in the Lebanese movie production field. The ensemble cast included not only Smayra himself but also acclaimed figures like Nadine Labaki and other stalwarts of the industry. The film's musical composition was masterfully crafted by Khaled Mouzanar, adding another layer of artistry to the project.

=== Feature films ===
==== Capernaum ====
Smayra was an executive producer on Nadine Labaki's Academy Award nominated "Capernaum" (2018).

The film debuted at the 2018 Cannes Film Festival, where it was selected to compete for the Palme d'Or, and won the Jury Prize. Capernaum received a 15-minute standing ovation following its premiere at Cannes on 17 May 2018.

Capernaum received critical acclaim, with particular praise given to the film's "documentary-like realism". Writing for The New York Times, Manohla Dargis and A. O. Scott named it as one of the greatest films of 2018. It was nominated for the Academy Award for Best Foreign Language Film at the 91st Academy Awards, among several other accolades.

Capernaum is both the highest-grossing Arabic and Middle Eastern film of all time, after becoming a sleeper hit at the international box office with over $68 million worldwide, against a production budget of $4 million. Its largest international market is China, where it became a surprise blockbuster with over $54 million.

==== Return to Sender ====
Smayra was an associate producer on Return to Sender, the 2015 American psychological thriller film directed by Fouad Mikati.

The film stars Rosamund Pike, Shiloh Fernandez, and Nick Nolte, and tells the story of Miranda Wells, a nurse in a small town, who experiences a traumatic incident when she is assaulted and raped by a man named William Finn. Despite the difficulties in her life following the attack, Miranda attempts to resume normalcy. However, she faces challenges, including the inability to sell her house due to the assault. Miranda starts corresponding with William in prison, eventually visiting him and developing an unusual relationship. Upon William's release, he tries to integrate into Miranda's life, but she secretly plans a brutal revenge. Miranda poisons William, revealing her dark past and inflicting severe harm on him. The film concludes with Miranda informing her father that William will no longer be a part of their lives.

==== Perfect Strangers ====
In a pivotal move in 2022, Smayra made his feature film directorial debut with Perfect Strangers, the Arabic adaptation of the 2016 Italian film Perfetti sconosciuti.

It is the first Arabic-language Netflix original film made purely by Arab production companies. The film stars Lebanese Academy Award nominated director and actress Nadine Labaki, Egyptian actress Mona Zaki, Egyptian actor Eyad Nassar, Lebanese actress Diamand Abou Abboud, and Lebanese actors Adel Karam, Georges Khabbaz, and Fouad Yammine.

This Netflix's inaugural Arab original film addressed themes of women's emancipation and LGBTQ rights, sparking significant controversy in the Middle East and Western Asia. The film topped the charts on Netflix as the most-viewed film in the Arab world for an entire month and reached the third position in the global Top 10 films in the non-English category. The film was also the second most watched film on Netflix in France.

Audience response During its initial week of release, Perfect Strangers achieved the status of being the most-watched film on Netflix in various Arab nations and secured the second spot in France. The film received acclaim from numerous Arab film enthusiasts online. However, its adherence to the original Italian source material, which includes explicit content such as sexual references, obscenities, infidelities, and the portrayal of a homosexual character, generated significant negative feedback on social media. Particularly, the conservative Egyptian audience criticized the film for what they perceived as "moral degradation."

The inclusion of popular Egyptian actress Mona Zaki intensified the scrutiny, with accusations and conspiracy theories circulating on social media. Prominent figures like Egyptian lawyer Ayman Mahfouz went as far as labeling the film a "plot to disrupt Arab society," planning legal action to have it removed from Netflix. Mahfouz objected to Zaki's character, highlighting instances of drinking and provocative scenes, despite the absence of visual nudity in the entire film. Politician Mustapha Bakri claimed the film "incites homosexuality and betrayal." In contrast, Saudi actor Nasser Al Qasabi, while enjoying the film's dialogue and direction, criticized Netflix for promoting homosexuality, expressing concerns about its impact on future Arab productions.

Conversely, Egypt's Actors Union released a statement expressing solidarity with the cast, especially Mona Zaki, advocating for the preservation of creative freedom and underscoring the role of artistic expression in addressing societal issues. Numerous Arab actors, including Amr Waked, Hend Sabry, Ahmad Fahmy, and Ghada Abdel Razek, expressed their support for Mona Zaki amidst the social media backlash.

== Personal life ==
Smayra is fluent in Arabic, French, and English.

He is best friends with Academy award nominated director Nadine Labaki, composer Khaled Mouzanar, and renowned politologist Sara El-Yafi.

== Filmography ==
Feature Films

Year	Title	Director	Writer	Producer	Notes
2015	Return to Sender	No	No	Yes	
2018	Capernaum	No	No	Yes	
2022	Perfect Strangers	Yes	Yes	No	

Short films

Year	Title	Director	Writer
2003	"Non métrage libanais"	Yes	Yes

Music videos

Year	Song	Artist	Notes
2004	"Fi El Albi Hawakom في القلب هواكم" (trans: "Your Love in my Heart)	Joe Ashkar	
2004	"Bet 7ebbeni بتحبني" (trans: "She loves me)	Joe Ashkar	
2004	"Nasīni El Donya نسينى الدنيا" (trans: "Make Me Forget the World")	Ragheb Alama	
2005	"El Hobb El Kebir الحب الكبير" (trans: "The Great Love")	Ragheb Alama	
2006	"Haklak Rahtak حقلق راحتك (trans: "I Will Disturb Your Comfort")	Myriam Fares	
2006	"Waheshni Eih وحشني ايه" (trans: "How Come I Miss You")	Myriam Fares	
2007	"4 Mots sur un piano" (trans: "4 Words on a Piano")	Jean-Jacques Goldman and Patrick Fiori	
2008	"Is2alni Ana اسألني أنا" (trans: "Ask me")	Sofia El Marikh	
2008	"Iyyam el Chitti ايام الشتي" (trans: "Winter Days")	Myriam Fares	
2008	"Betrouh بتروح" (trans: "You Leave")	Myriam Fares	
2009	"Tahwak تهواك" (trans: "...who loves you")	Sofia El Marikh	
2012	"Habeeb Dehkāty حبيب ضحكاتي" (trans: "The Love of my Laughs")	Ragheb Alama	
