= List of Shahid original programming =

Shahid is the first and largest Arabic content streaming platform in the Middle East and North Africa region (MENA). Part of MBC GROUP, Shahid is home to original productions from the Arab world, a wide range of exclusive movies and premieres, as well as the top watched live Arab TV channels.

== Shahid Original series ==
In 2019, Shahid began producing their own originals series. The first series that premiered under the aegis of Shahid Original series was El Diva, a drama featuring superstar Cyrine Abdelnour, and Yacob Alfarhan.

The platform has rapidly grown its portfolio to include original content from different countries, and genres that range from drama to comedy to thriller. Shahid Original series are available exclusively to Shahid VIP subscribers.

All programming is in Arabic, listed below by launch date and classified by primary genres.

Title	Summary	Genre	Stars	Episodes	Runtime	Origin	Launch
El Diva(The Diva)	Behind the stage of a talent show is a world of secrets and conflicts	Drama	Cyrine Abdelnour, Yacob Alfarhan, Boussy, Wasam Faris, Stephanie Atala, Dory Al-Samrany	8 episodes	15 min.	Lebanon	Nov 2019
Fi Kol Osboua Youm Gomaâ (Every Week Has a Friday)	"Layla" a girl with mysterious past forced to live with "Emad" a mentally challenged man in his house while a series of violent crimes happens every Friday	Crime, Drama	Menna Shalaby, Asser Yassin, Sawsan Bader, Ahmed Khaled Saleh, Abdel Aziz Makhyoun, Rushdy El Shamy	10 episodes	45 min.	Egypt	Jan 2020
Ahd Al-Dam (Blood Oath)	An ordinary man who is forced to become a terrifying assassin in order to protect his wife and children at the hands of drug dealers.	Crime, Action	Basel Khayat, Rodney Haddad, Alain Saadeh, Nadine Tahssine Bek, Aya Teba, Nada Abu Fahrat	10 episodes	55 min.	Lebanon	Feb 2020
Huna al'ard (Here is Earth)	A comedy series about our daily stories told from Salam's perspective who loves scientific theories, where she meets an alien looking to acclimate.	Comedy	Salam Qatanani, Saed Dazdar, Maha Jaafar, Reem Nadr, Hesham Afifi, Maya Acra, Abdulrhman Al-Shaikhi	10 episodes	10 min.	PAN	April 2020
Al Shak	Samar is isolated in her family's old house during lockdown. Mistakenly, she logs into the wrong video chat and witnesses a murder. The mysterious killer turn her life into a living hell, forcing her to fight for her life and face the demons of her past.	Horror, Drama	Fatima AlBanawi, Kosai Khauli, Razane Jammal, Nadia Malkae	10 episodes	10 min.	Saudi Arabia	June 2020
Khurais	The long-standing friendship of a group of friends is put to the test when they establish a new media company together called Khurais	Drama	Osama Saleh, Shojaa Nashat, Abdelrahman Abdullah, Rakan Zahed, Amr Saleh, Marim Abdulrhman	8 episodes	10 min.	Saudi Arabia	June 2020
Mamlaket Eblis S1/S2 (Kingdom of Satan: The Legend of Legends)	The death of a leader brings chaos to an Egyptian community	Fantasy	Ghada Adel, Rania Yousef, Eman Al Assy, Salwa Khattab, Ahmed Dawood, Asmaa Galal	15 episodes	45 min.	Egypt	July 2020
El Harami (The Thief)	Following a family's abrupt return home, an amateur thief finds himself stuck in their apartment amidst the COVID-19 lockdown.	Suspense, Drama	Ahmed Dash, Bayoumi Fouad, Rania Yousef, Caroline Azmy, Rana Raeis	10 episodes	13 min.	Egypt	July 2020
The Case	Detective Turki, works on solving murder cases, faces an internal investigation about the wrong practices that he performs while resolving cases.	Mystery, Drama	Faisal Al - Dukhi, Reem Al Habib	10 episodes	15 min.	Saudi Arabia	September 2020
Karimophobia	After graduating; Karim & Salem decided to go back to Dubai to open their own Therapy clinic. While Karim works very hard. Salem spend most of his time on his Dad's yacht while Karim's personal life becomes more chaotic.	Comedy	Shadi Alfons, Muhannad Hattab	8 episodes	10 min.	PAN	September 2020
Beirut 6:07	An anthology TV series that pays tribute to the immense casualties of the Beirut port blast through a succession of 15 short stories inspired by true events and real people	Drama, Social Commentary	N/A	15 episodes	10 min.	Lebanon	October 2020
Nemra Etnein (This Other Thing)	A pan-Arab romantic anthology, comprising eight episodes, each with an independent story featuring different characters and a different theme or series of events. “Nemra Etnein” introduces a different take on love and relationships in our modern society.	Romance	Mona Zaki, Ahmed Eldaadany, Amr Youssef, Saba Mubarak, Noha Abdin, Nelly Karim, Adel Karam, Menna Shalaby, Ahmed Malek, Shereen Reda, Maged Elkedwany, Sarah Taiba, Yaacoub Alfarhan, Amina Khalil, Eyad Nassar	10 episodes	50 min.	Egypt	October 2020
El Omara - The Building	A comedy series following people from all parts of life who live in the same building as they get caught in hilarious situations every day.	Comedy	Shimaa Seif, Mohamed Sallam, Hamdy Al Marghany, Sherif Desoky, Salwa Khattab, Mohamed Tharwat, Bayoumi Fouad	10 episodes	22 min.	Egypt	December 2020
Al Daheeh Museum (Daheeh's Museum)	Inside a wax museum with its historical figures, we find Al Daheeh statue, but when the sun sets the statues come to life, and history repeats itself.	Comedy, Biography	Ahmed El Ghandour	5 episodes	55 min.	Egypt	October 2020
The Fixer (مسلسل فكسر)	When an Arab celebrity has a problem, fixer Tony Tabet is the solution. Now he wants out to reconnect with his son, and with one month left on the job.	Comedy, Action	Badi Abu Chakra, Sara Abi Kanaan, Diamond Bou Abboud, Wissam Saliba, Geneid Zein Aldin, Zeina Maki	8 episodes	15 min.	Lebanon	December 2020
The Late Morning Show (برنامج لوك داون)	A show that offers several social and sarcastic issues during quarantine with the participation of internet celebrities in comedic segments.	Comedy, Social Commentary	Bader Saleh	15 episodes	15 min.	Saudi Arabia	April 2020
