= Essam Wel Mesbah =

- Genre: comedy
- Created by: Techno Fan (2009 - 2012), Toya (Esmat Frahat) (2016 - present)
- Written by: Esmat Farhat
- Directed by: Mohamed Soliman
- Starring: Moustafa Amar; Ahmed El-Fishawy; Donia Samir Ghanem; Dorra Zarrouk; Nesma Mahgoub; Randa El Behery; Mai Ezz Eldin
- Theme music composer: Moustafa Amar (also singer, lyrics by Awad Badawy, arranged by Hazem Raafat)
- Country of origin: Egypt
- Original language: Arabic
- No. of seasons: 6
- No. of episodes: 600

Production
- Running time: 10 min

Original release
- Network: Nilesat (2011 - 2012), Ten Network (ar) (2016 - 2022)
- Release: August 1, 2011 – 2022

Essam Wel Mesbah is an Egyptian animated comedy television series for young people.

== Premise ==
The series revolves around the brother of the legendary hero Alaa El-Din (Aladdin) known but he lives in our time and postpones all his dreams and ambitions until he can find a magic lamp like his brother. He is therefore lazy and not industrious in his study, which causes his relationship with his friends, parents and teachers to deteriorate.

One day he finds an actual magic lamp and comes out of it "reap" Genie of a new type, as it is necessary to find him to achieve his dreams, forcing Essam to strive to achieve the demands of the genie, which teaches many things and develops from his character so that he learns at the end of the episodes that the realization of dreams of work and science and grandfather, and not magic lamps and superstition.

It aired in six seasons during Ramadan of 2011, 2012, 2016, 2017, 2018, and 2022.

== Cast ==
- Essam: Ahmed El-Fishawy (season 1), Moustafa Amar (seasons 2-6)
- Jasmine: Donia Samir Ghanem (season 1), Dorra Zarrouk (season 2), Nesma Mahgoub (season 3), Randa El Behery (season 4), Randa El Behery (Season 5), Mai Ezz Eldin (season 6)
- Shafiq: Mohi Ismail (seasons 1-3), Mohamed Abdel Moati (seasons 4-6)
- Uncle Atman: Mohamed Farid
- Sensena: Moataz Abdel Sabour (season 1), Engy Wegdan (seasons 2-6)
- Gargul: Ashraf Mahdi
- Miss Anshrah: Aida Fahmy
- Uncle Faraj: Mohammed Al-Dandani
- Uncle Saket: Bayoumi Fouad
- Awatif: Ola Rushdie (seasons 2-6)
- Hadi: Amy Samir Ghanem (seasons 1-3), Mona Aboul Gheit (seasons 4-6)
- Nakhla: Shehab Ibrahim (seasons 2-6)
- Captain Mohsen:Mahmoud Amer (seasons 1-3), Ashraf Mahdi (seasons 4-6)
