= Black Suits You so Well =

Book by Ahlam Mosteghanemi

- First edition
- Author: Ahlam Mosteghanemi
- Language: Arabic
- Genre: Novel
- Published: 2012
- Publisher: Dar Nofal
- Publication place: Algeria
- Pages: 331
- ISBN: 9789953267135
- OCLC: 1136005832
- Website: https://www.worldcat.org/title/aswad-yaliqu-bik/oclc/1136005832&referer=brief_results

Black Suits You so Well is a novel by Algerian novelist Ahlam Mosteghanemi, published in 2012 by Dar Nofal.

== Summary ==
The novel revolves around a fifty-year-old Lebanese millionaire who fell in love with an Algerian singer by the name of Hala El-Wafi, at the age of twenty-seven. Talal, who has struggled to enrich his cultural crop in music, art and poetry, begins to develop plan after plan to entrap this beautiful woman who wears black to mourn the killing of her father and brother during the turmoil in Algeria at the beginning of this century.

== Quotes ==
- “Only a person who has lost love deserves to sing it...Great art is like great love that is nourished by deprivation.”
- “Mourning is not in what we wear, but in what we see. It is in our view of things. The eyes of our heart can be in mourning..No one knows.”
- “Pride is to say things in the text of a word, not to repeat it. Not to insist that the other never see you naked. To protect your mystery as you protect your secret.”
- “Money does not bring happiness, but it allows us to live our misery with luxury.”

== The Characters ==
There are many characters in the novel varied between main and secondary characters, and what follows is a detailed explanation of the characters in the novel:

- Hala Al-Wafi : is the main character in the novel, as she is a twenty seven year old Algerian girl, she is specialized in Arabic literature and was a teacher for children in the primary stage, while her father was a well-known musician and singer, she used to wear black because of the killing of her brother and father by terrorists in Algeria, so she found in the black a relief from life. Her mother had to seek refuge in Syria. From that inevitable death to everyone, she tended to sing, as she possessed a golden throat that enabled her, so her aura was filled with dignity and pride and saturated with the power of strength until Talal cut her way with bouquets of black tulips attached to a card on which was written black befitting you.
- Talal Hashem : The second main character, a very wealthy Lebanese businessman whose fortune journey began from Brazil. He is married and has two daughters. A man is fond of women, but he did not trust one of them because of what he was exposed to from a failed love story at the beginning of his life. He could not get his life dream of being He has a boy who inherits his name and wealth, until he saw Hala on one of the TV interviews after one of her concerts. Talal fell in love with the girl Hala and tried to set up a window for her, sign her, and get her heart, even if that was against her will. Alone, but she refused to make that the last covenant between them.
- The character of the mother "Hind": The mother of Hala Al-Wafi and she is one of the secondary characters in the story and did not appear much, but it reflected her character through Hala and how she was keen on her children, as she pushed Hala to leave to Syria to be safe.
- Father's character : The second secondary character that influenced Hala Al-Wafi's life, as she loved him very much and resolved to learn singing and playing in order to preserve her father's legacy, playing the oud he left after him.
- Alaa: One of the secondary characters in the story. He is Hala's brother and a medical student. He was a volunteer in aiding the wounded and killed by the terrorists, and her tragedy with him is even greater than her father's.
- Naglaa: A minor character in the novel, but she was one of the most important characters, as she kept Hala's secrets and always helped her by giving advices, and she often spent time with her.
- Jamal: He was Hala's cousin, and she saw something in him from her brother Alaa, and she often joked with him to relieve her tension and always took her to her concerts.

== Critics' Opinions ==
The writer Majeda Hammod says:

Ahlam Mosteghanemi presented in her novel "The Black Befitting You" an exceptional love story, so she chose to present two heroes (a man and a woman) who gave them exceptional qualities, and if the recipient seemed more interested in the voice of women.

The writer Ameen Rawabhy in his book "The Style of the Protagonist in the Novel the Black Fits you for Ahlem Mostaghanem" says:

The first thing that attracted our curiosity is the character of the hero Talal Hashem, whom the writer was able to show with her distinct artistic way eloquently and in style.

== See also ==
- Forgetting.com (Novel)
- The Passenger Of a Bed
