= Memory in the Flesh =

1993 novel by Ahlam Mostaghanmi

Memory in the flesh
- Author: Ahlam Al-Mustaghanmi
- Language: Arabic
- Published: 1993, Beirut
- Publication date: 1993
- Publication place: Beirut

Memory in the Flesh is a novel written by the Algerian writer Ahlam Mostaghanmi and published in Beirut in 1993. It won the Naguib Mahfouz Medal for Literature for the year 1998. Nineteen editions had been published by February 2004, and as of 2022 more than 3 million copies were sold worldwide.

== Summary ==
An artist called "Khalid bin Tubal" lost his arm in the war, and falls in love with a beautiful girl called "Hayat", who is the daughter of an Algerian fighter who was a friend of Khalid during the liberation revolution. Her father was killed during the great liberation war against the French colonization of Algeria. Hayat also falls in love with Khalid but without telling him, and with the sudden presence of "Ziyad" a friend of Khalid, who is a fighter in the Palestinian revolution, things get complicated between Khalid and Hayat, and in the end, she faces her society's traditions and marries an influential figure in the Algerian government. With this marriage and other compelling circumstances that Khaled passes through his life completely falls over.

== Reception ==
Memory in the Flesh was the bestselling novel for years according to the statistics of the Arab book fairs (Beirut Exhibition - Amman - Syria - Tunisia - Sharjah). It is the topic of many undergraduate studies and theses across the Arab world in the universities of Jordan, Syria, Algeria, Tunisia, Morocco, Marseille, and Bahrain.

== Adaptation ==
The copyrights of the novel were bought by "Misr International Films Company" in 1998 to produce a film based on the novel, but with a request from the author, the contract was terminated in 2001. The Arab actor Nour El-Sherif expressed more than once his wish to make a film about the work and promised to take it to Cannes international film festival. The Algerian actress Amal Bouchoucha started her first acting experience in the TV series through the Memory in the Flesh series, after she started singing and presenting TV programs. The series was made up of 30 episodes, starring the Syrian actor Jamal Suleiman, and was aired during the holy month of Ramadan in 2010 on Abu Dhabi, directed by the Syrian director Najdat Ismail Azour. The series didn't receive a lot of success because of its inability to transfer the poetic text that was the source of the success of the fictional work, but the work is considered among the rare cinematic productions that mimic the educated class. Amal Bouchoucha plays the character Hayat, the daughter of an Algerian fighter who dies during the great liberation war against the French colonization of Algeria to achieve liberation. Her father's friend from war falls in love with her, who is also entrusted to maintain her family consisting of her, her mother, and her brother, while she falls in love with a Palestinian journalist and writer who fights for the Palestinian cause.

== Awards ==
- The 1998 Naguib Mahfouz Medal for Literature, an award by the American University in Cairo for the most important work of fiction in Arabic not translated in English.
- "Noor" award by the Noor Foundation for Women's Creativity in Cairo in 1996.
- George Tarabay for Culture and Creativity award for the year 1999 for the most important creative work (Beirut).

== Translation ==
Memory in the Flesh was translated into many international languages including Italian, Chinese, Kurdish, English, and French.
