= Ahmed Malik =

Ahmed Malik or Malek may refer to:

- Ahmed Malik (Invasion)
- Ahmed Malek, Egyptian actor
- Ahmed Malek (musician), Algerian musician and composer
