= Chaos of the Senses =

Novel by Ahlam Mosteghanemi

- Author: Ahlam Mosteghanemi
- Language: Arabic
- Published: 1997
- Publisher: Dar-Nofal
- Publication place: Algeria

Chaos of the Senses is a novel by the novelist, Ahlam Mosteghanemi published in 1997 by Hachette Antoine publishing house. The novel was translated by Nancy Roberts.

== Summary ==
The story starts with a narration about a man with a weird and chaotic philosophy who meets a kind of weak woman. The story continues like this for a few pages until the writer interferes with the writing. The writer later discovers a surprising match between her narration and reality, as she found out that the cinema where she conducted the interview is there in reality and it shows the same film at the same time. The writer finds herself intrigued to attend the film and finds the person who is the hero of the film. The events begin to overlap when she meets who she thinks is the "chosen person" who resembles the hero of the first part and who the reader thinks is one of her trilogy Memory in the Flesh, a wonderful story that the writer conveys between the Algerian struggle and the Algerian woman, in addition to the heritage of Palestine. In summary: the novel tells the story of Hayat in the midst of the Algerian Civil War, who is a young novelist trapped in a loveless marriage Her husband, a high-ranking officer, occupies himself with politics, and Hayat finds freedom from her life in the world of her writing, where she writes a passionate story for her characters.

== Quotes ==
- "Love ends when we start laughing about the things that cried because of one day."
- "We come and go, without even knowing why we loved this person and not that? and why do we die this day and not that? why now? why here? why us and no one else? And because of that love and death alone feed each other and nourish all world literature, outside of these two topics, nothing is worth writing about."
- "“To be alone for two hours in a car driven by a military chauffeur who takes you back from date of love, going through the streets of anger and the alleys of death, is nothing but a tragic fall into reality, and enough time to regret. The garment of piety that you wear will help you in that."
