= Perfect Strangers (2022 film) =

Arabic comedy-drama film

- Official release poster
- Arabic: أصحاب… ولا أعزّ
- Literally: Friends… and no dearer
- Directed by: Wissam Smayra
- Written by: Wissam Smayra; Gabriel Yammine
- Based on: Perfetti sconosciuti by: Paolo Genovese; Filippo Bologna; Paolo Costella; Paola Mammini; Rolando Ravello
- Produced by: Gianluca Chakra; Mohamed Hefzy; Mario Jr. Haddad; Hisham Alghanim
- Starring: Mona Zaki; Nadine Labaki; Eyad Nassar; Adel Karam; Georges Khabbaz; Diamand Bou Abboud; Fouad Yammine
- Cinematography: Sofian el Fani
- Edited by: Cherine Debs
- Music by: Khaled Mouzanar
- Production companies: Front Row Filmed Entertainment; Empire Entertainment; Film Clinic; Yalla Yalla
- Distributed by: Netflix
- Release dates: 17 January 2022 (Dubai); 20 January 2022 (Worldwide)
- Running time: 99 minutes
- Countries: Egypt; Lebanon; United Arab Emirates
- Language: Arabic

Perfect Strangers (Arabic: أصحاب… ولا أعزّ, romanized: As'hab… wa'la a'az, lit. 'Friends… and no dearer') is a 2022 Arabic comedy-drama film, produced by Dubai-based Front Row Filmed Entertainment with Yalla Yalla, Beirut-based Empire Entertainment, and Cairo-based Film Clinic. It is an Arab remake of the 2016 Italian film Perfetti sconosciuti, and is the first Arabic-language Netflix original film made purely by Arab production companies. The film was directed and co-written by Wissam Smayra, his debut film in the director's seat, and stars Mona Zaki, Nadine Labaki, Eyad Nassar, Adel Karam, Georges Khabbaz, Diamand Abou Abboud, and Fouad Yammine.

The film had a red carpet premiere in Dubai on 17 January 2022, and was released worldwide via Netflix on 20 January 2022.

== Plot ==
May and Walid were hosting a dinner party at their suburban Beirut home for a group of friends during a rare, total lunar eclipse occurring later that evening. During dinner, the subject of an absent couple who were in a marital crisis was brought up, with the husband having an affair with a younger woman, and his wife finding out from a text message on his phone. The group then discuss how they are heavily dependent on their phones, and are reluctant to share their phones with their loved ones. To make it interesting, May then suggests a game where everyone surrenders their phones to exposure on the table, and any messages, emails, or calls received on anyone's phone would have to be shared with everyone else. As the game progresses, more secrets are exposed, placing doubt and creating rifts in their friendships and marriages.

As the guests leave May and Walid's in the end, the lunar eclipse passes completely, and the group behave as if the game never happened, and their relationships have not been strained.

== Cast ==
- Mona Zaki as Mariam (مريم), an Egyptian mother of two and Shereef's wife
- Nadine Labaki as May (مي), mother of Sophie and Walid's wife
- Eyad Nassar as Shereef (شريف), Mariam's husband
- Adel Karam as Ziad (زياد), Jenna's newlywed husband
- Georges Khabbaz as Walid (وليد), father of Sophie and May's husband
- Diamand Abou Abboud as Jana (جنى), Ziad's newlywed wife
- Fouad Yammine as Rabea (ربيع), a childhood friend of Ziad, Walid, and Shereef
- Sinead Chaaya as Sophie (صوفي), May and Walid's 18-year-old daughter

Lebanese newscaster and journalist Mona Saliba cameos as the MTV news presenter (Note: She has been working for MTV since 2020 in real life.) reporting on the lunar eclipse.

== Production ==
In October 2018, U.A.E. film production and distribution company Front Row Filmed Entertainment, and its Kuwaiti financial partner Cinescape, signed a deal with Medusa Film for the rights to produce an Arabic-language remake of Medusa's 2016 film Perfetti sconosciuti. Front Row planned to collaborate with Lebanese Empire Entertainment and Egyptian Film Clinic production studios on the remake, and later in association with Front Row's subsidiary Yalla Yalla. (Note: Yalla Yalla is a Dubai-based joint venture between Front Row Filmed Entertainment and London-based production studio Rocket Science. It was founded in May 2019.) The film was originally intended for a theatrical release, with Front Row and Empire International distributing to the Gulf and Levant regions, whilst Film Clinic handled the Egyptian market.

In December 2020, the film's cast and shooting schedule were confirmed. The multi-national cast includes Diamand Abou Abboud, Adel Karam, (Note: This is the third Netflix-related debut production involving Adel Karam, after his own stand-up comedy show Adel Karam: Live From Beirut, which is considered the very first Netflix Arab production in general, and the television series Dollar, the first Lebanese series on Netflix.) Georges Khabbaz, Nadine Labaki, Eyad Nassar, Fouad Yammine, and Mona Zaki. In addition, Wissam Smayra was set to direct, and co-wrote the script with Gabriel Yammine. This is Smayra's debut film as a director, who previously worked as producer on Nadine Labaki's Capernaum. Labaki's husband Khaled Mouzanar worked on the film's musical score. Front Row CEO Gianluca Chakra, Film Clinic CEO Mohamed Hefzy, and Empire president Mario Jr. Haddad were the film's producers. All three producers agree the film is a rare example of a successful pan-Arab feature film co-production. Filming was scheduled in Lebanon in February 2021 after suffering a delay in 2020 due to the COVID-19 pandemic and on-going protests, in addition to the devastating Beirut Port explosion that year. Filming officially wrapped up in March 2021, and was originally expected to release by the end of the year.

In December 2021, it has been confirmed that Netflix has boarded up the film, and set to launch the title worldwide as its first Arabic original feature film on 20 January 2022, superseding the initial theatrical release plan. Front Row has apparently signed a first-look production deal with Netflix, which made this possible. On 13 January 2022, the film's official trailer was released. On 17 January 2022, a red carpet premiere event was organised at the Bulgari Resort Dubai at Jumeirah Bay, with many of the cast and crew in attendance. Three days later, the film launched worldwide via Netflix with three dubs and 31 subtitles. (Note: For some reason, English is currently not included among said languages, as either dubbing or subtitles.)

== Reception ==
=== Audience reaction ===
During its launch week, Perfect Strangers managed to become the most watched movie on Netflix across multiple Arab countries, and is also the second most watched film on Netflix in France.

Although the film was praised by many Arab film enthusiasts online, its subject matter, which is largely faithful to its Italian source material, including the sexual references, obscenities, infidelities, and a homosexual character, also received a lot of negative backlash on social media, especially from the largely conservative Egyptian people, accusing the film of “moral degradation”, amongst other accusations and conspiracy theories. The inclusion of popular Egyptian actress Mona Zaki brought a lot of attention to the film from Egyptian viewers. More notable figures, such as the Egyptian lawyer Ayman Mahfouz claiming that the film was a "plot to disrupt Arab society", and that Zaki was the "champion" of such a plot. Mahfouz is planning to push a lawsuit to have the film taken down from Netflix. Note that Zaki's character is portrayed as a chronic drinker, and has removed her panties in one scene without explanation, albeit there is no visual nudity in the entire film. The politician Mustapha Bakri, who in a statement to the speaker of Egypt's House of Representatives said the film "incites homosexuality and betrayal." Saudi actor Nasser Al Qasabi admitted on Twitter to enjoy the film's dialogue and direction, but accused Netflix of being "corrupt and inciting corruption" for "exciting and marketing" the concept of homosexuality, expressing concern how it may skew future Arab productions into portraying the subject matter.

On the other side of the coin, Egypt's Actors Union issued a statement in solidarity with for the cast of Perfect Strangers, especially Mona Zaki, calling for the preservation of "creative freedom" and emphasising the role of "artistic expression" in addressing issues in society. Many other fellow Arab actors also expressed their support for Mona Zaki in the midst of the backlash via social media, including Amr Waked, Hend Sabry, Ahmad Fahmy, and Ghada Abdel Razek.

=== Critical reception ===
The movie instantly became Netflix’s first Arabic film to top the charts, but simultaneously attracted criticism, leading to a call for banning the OTT platform. The remake of the Italian film by the same name caused outrage in Egypt with calls for the streaming service to be banned and criticism of Mona Zaki, the Egyptian actress starring in the film. The particular backlash against Zaki came following her previous “clean” roles as compared to the wife who exchanges sexy messages with a stranger in Perfect Strangers. Meanwhile, defenders of the film have called out its critics and demanded them to cancel their Netflix subscription.
