= Amel Bouchoucha =

Algerian actress born 1982

Amel Bouchoucha أمل بوشوشة
- Born: 25 July 1982 (age 43); Oran, Algeria
- Occupation(s): Actress, singer
- Years active: 2008–present
- Spouse: Waleed Awada (m. 2015)
- Children: 1

Amel Bouchoucha also known as Amal Bouchoucha (Arabic: أمل بوشوشة; born 25 July 1982) is an Algerian actress and singer.

== Biography ==
Bouchoucha was born in Oran.

In 2015, Bouchoucha married Lebanese businessman Waleed Awada, originally from Nabatieh. She had her daughter Lea in 2017.

== Career ==
=== Star Academy ===
Amal first came to prominence after participating in the 5th Season of Star Academy Arab World, representing her home country of Algeria. During her time on the show Amal's popularity and fan base quickly grew and was noted for her strong voice as well as her unique and vivacious stage presence.

During her Star Academy tenure her repertoire consisted mainly of Arabic and French language songs.

Amal was nominated 3 times during the season, the first being in the show's 8th Prime against Palestinian contestant Zaher Saleh and Moroccan contestant Asma Bassite. During the nomination segment she performed a popular hit from Najwa Karam called "Shou Hal Hala". Later on that same prime she would share the stage with Egyptian contestant Mirhan Hussein and guest performer Haifa Wehbe in a cover of Warda Al-Jazairia's classic song "Ana Andi Baghbagan". Amal later on performed solo singing Myriam Fares's "Nadini". At the end of the prime Amal won the majority of the public votes which her saved her to perform another week.

Her second Nomination in the show's 12th prime pitted her against Moroccan contestant Diaa Taybi and Tunisian candidate Amal Mahalaoui. At the end of the prime, she was saved by the public yet again.

Her third nomination in the show's 13th prime resulted in her shocking elimination from the competition as the Moroccan nominee Diaa, whom she was pitted against in the previous prime won the majority of the public votes which left the other students to choose between her and Palestinian contestant Zaher. The majority of the students' votes went to Zaher. Although she was eliminated Amal still managed to make her mark by delivering a stunning performance during the prime by performing alongside Egyptian-Canadian guest singer Chantal Chamandy in a cover of Dalida's "Helwa Ya Baladi".

Other noteworthy moments to be mentioned is her numerous sketches in which she performed as a member of the Academy's Angels, a trio consisting of herself, Mirhan Hussein and Amal Mahalaoui which was the show's spin on Charlie's Angels.

During the show's final prime which saw the crowning of Tunisian candidate Nader Guirat as the show's inaugural Maghrebi winner, Amal graced the stage yet again by performing alongside international guest Tina Arena doing a cover of her iconic song "Aimee Jusqu L'Impossible" and also alongside fellow Academy Angel Mirhan Hussein in a cover of Sherine Abdel Wahab's hit song "Ana Sabry Aleel". Later on the prime she shared the stage one last time with her fellow contestants in a tributeto Egyptian Icon Abdel Halim Hafez by performing his classic hit "Wehyat Albi Wefraho".

Two years following her Star Academy Tenure, Amal released a single "Batal El Alam Arabi" which was a campaign single showing support for the Algerian football team during the 2010 World Cup.

=== As a TV presenter ===
- 2008: Hosting of Top 20 on Rotana
- 2009: Hosting of Tir w Farqeh on LBCI
- 2014: Hosting of Mshabah alik with Amr Youssef on Abu Dhabi TV

== Filmography ==
=== Series ===
Amel Bouchoucha contributed to several series:

- 2010: Dhakirat al-Jasad (English: Memories of the flesh) adapted the novel Memories of the Flesh by Ahlam Mosteghanemi.
- 2011: Djalasat nesaiya (English: Women's Hearings)
- 2012: Zaman el barghout (English: hours embers)
- 2013: Teen Wolf (first English Language show she has ever done)
- 2013: That el ard (English: Underground)
- 2014: Al ikhwa (English: Brothers)
- 2015: El araab (English: The Godfather)
- 2016: El araab 2 (English: The Godfather 2)
- 2016: Madrasat el hob (English: The School of love)
- 2016: Samarcande
- 2017: Ahl Al Gharam 3
- 2018: Abo Omar El-Masry, based on two best-selling novels by Ezzedine Choukri Fishere; The Killing of Fakhredine (1995) and Abo Omar Al-Masry (2010)
- 2019: Dollar (series shown on Netflix dubbed in English, Spanish, Turkish, Portuguese, French, and Italian) [Voiced by Heidi Brook Myers in the English Dub]
