= Ahmed Hatem (actor) =

Egyptian actor (born 1987)

- أحمد حاتم
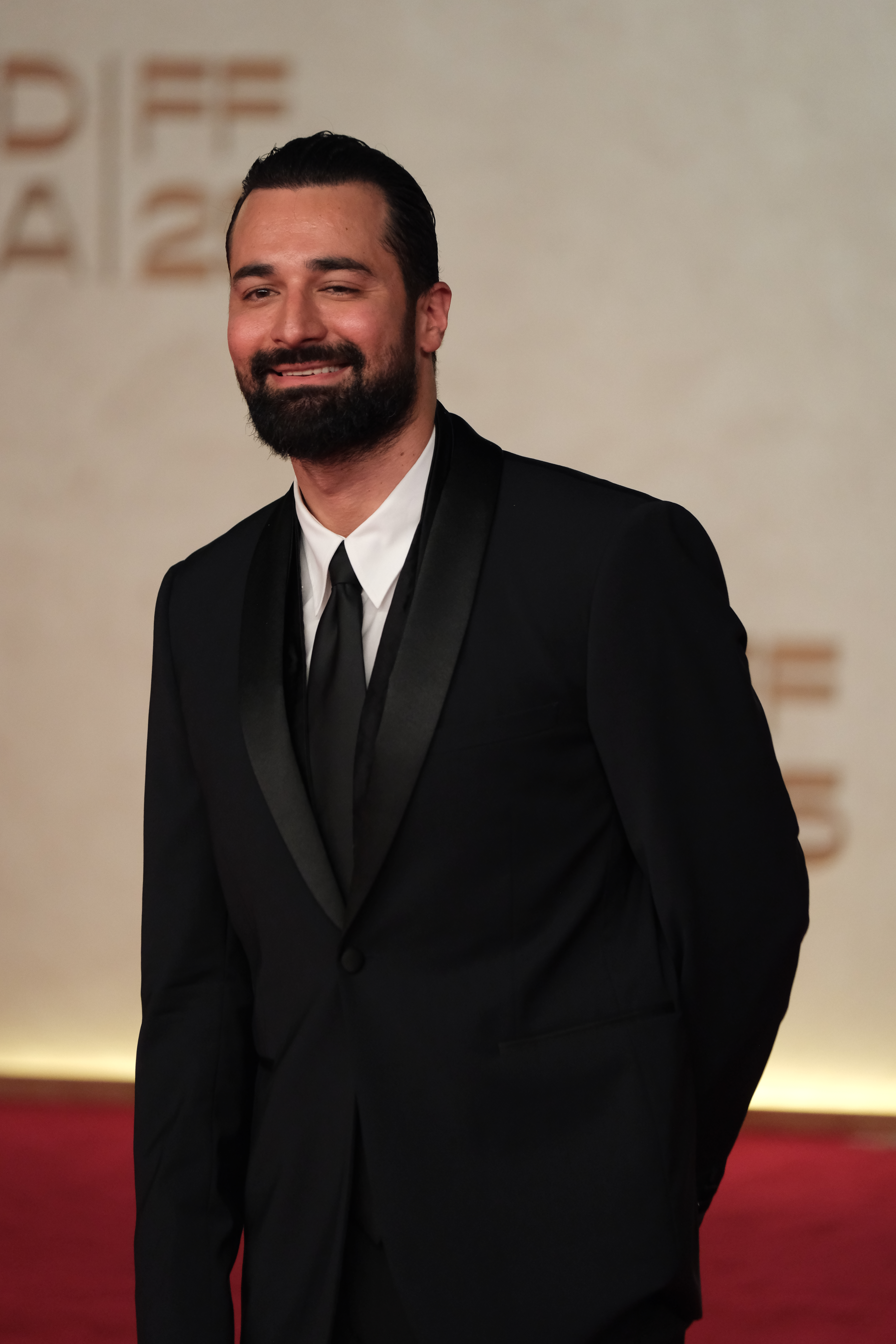
- Hatem in 2025
- Born: 25 December 1987 (age 38); Dokki, Giza, Egypt
- Occupation: Actor

Ahmed Hatem (born 25 December 1987) is an Egyptian actor.

He was born in the Dokki district of Giza, Egypt. He made his acting debut in the 2006 film Leisure Time.

He was part of the Egyptian swimming team that earned the Guinness World Record for the fastest 100 x 50 m relay in 2021.

Hatem, Summer Shesha, Marwan Hamed, Tara Emad, and Menna Shalabi were featured on the Vogue Arabia cover for April 2024.

== Filmography ==
=== Film ===
Year(s)	Title	Role	Notes	Ref.
2006	Leisure Time	Hazem		
2016	The Fourth Pyramid	Yusuf		
2017	The Treasure	—		
2019	The Treasure 2	—		
2019	Love Story	—		
2021	My Bride	Sherif		
2021	Mousa	Yusuf		
2021	Full Moon	—		
2023	Hassan Al Masry	—		
2023	The Outcasts	Salah		
2024	Asheq	—		
2024	The Atheist	—		
2024	Aserb: The Squadron	—		

=== Television ===
Year(s)	Title	Role	Notes	Ref.
2021	Shaqah 6	—		
2022	Me and Her	Seleam		
2024	Omar Effendi	Ali		
