= Stolen Kisses (disambiguation) =

Stolen Kisses is a 1968 French romantic comedy-drama film directed by François Truffaut.

Stolen Kisses may also refer to:

- Stolen Kisses (1929 film), an American comedy film
- Stolen Kisses (2008 film), an Egyptian film
- "Stolen Kisses" (Dawson's Creek), a 2000 television episode
