= Their hearts are with us - and their bombs are on us =

2009 book

Their Hearts are With Us and Their Bombs are on Us
- Author: Ahlam Mostaghenami
- Language: Arabic
- Genre: Nonfiction
- Publisher: Dar Al Adab Publishing House
- Publication date: 2009
- Publication place: Lebanon
- Pages: 264

Their Hearts are With Us and Their Bombs are on Us (2009) is a book written by Algerian author, Ahlem Mosteghanemi.

The book is a collection of opinion articles written by Mosteghanemi in her previous weekly column in Emirati magazine, Zahrat Al Khaleej, in a span of 10 years, where she organised the articles according to their dates.

== Main Idea ==
The articles are a reflection of the author's political views revolving around Arab rulers, US politics, and wars that Arab countries underwent and still undergo.

In addition, Mosteghanemi discusses the political situations in Iraq since its 2003 invasion, along with the story of the Iraqi journalist who threw his shoe at President Bush in front of the cameras and journalists.

She also sheds light on the "conspiracy" that the Arab world has experienced during the past years, as despite Mosteghanemi focusing on Iraq's case, she also tends to illustrate the image of the Arab world's situation overall.

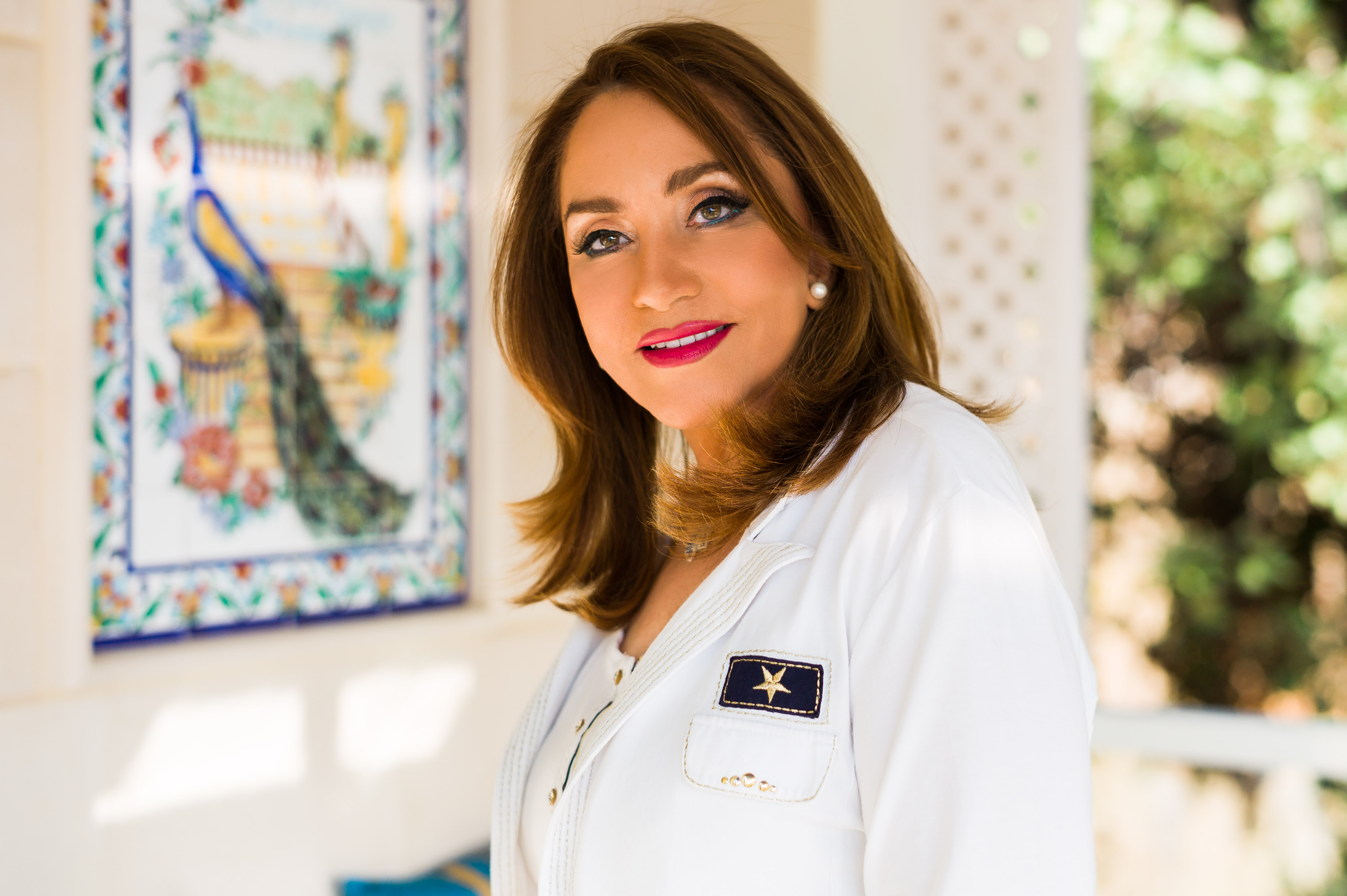
Author of "Their Hearts are With Us and Their Bombs are on Us" in December 2016

The book is split into four chapters differentiated through categories, where each contain the relevant opinion articles:

1. "Learn from Bush": the articles here talk about President Bush at the period of a US led invasion to Iraq
2. "The Brave, Offended Iraqi": the author discusses the fate of Iraqi scholars and scientists, in addition to "the country's suffering and its inability to protect these scholars and scientists"
3. "My Aunt, America": the author speaks of how "America never differentiated between kisses and bombs, hence it often sent missiles bombarding safe citizens".
4. "Goodnight, Arabs": in this final chapter, the author argues about how "the biggest conspiracy the Arab world has been exposed to is stripping the word "conspiracy" itself out of its meaning, until it no longer calls for caution, nor alertness to what is being plotted against the people".

== Quotes ==
- "Homeland is expensive for an honourables' hearts"
- "George Kordahi may add a new question to his show:

What is the amount of pension that an Iraqi scholar or scientist receives every month?

$2000? $200? $20? or $2?

No need to get help from a friend, but only borrow tissues to cry. The answer is $2!!"

== Reviews ==
Several professors argue in a research conducted about Mostaghenami's book, that her writings tend to reflect her experiences and feelings, explaining her writing style and diction used to express her thoughts

Also, AbdulQader Kaaban points out to how Mostaghenami uses satirical writing throughout the articles in order to express her ideas and position.

== Related Links ==
- Ahlem Mostaghenami
