= Leisure Time =

- Arabic: أوقات فراغ
- Directed by: Mohammed Moustafa
- Written by: Omar Gamal; Mohamed Moqbel
- Produced by: Hussein El-Kalla; Isaad Younis; Al Arabia Cinema
- Starring: Ahmed Hatem; Amr Abed; Karim Kassem; Randa El-Behairy; Safa Taj Al-Din; Ahmed Haddad
- Cinematography: Samir Bahzan; Raouf Abdel Aziz
- Edited by: Maha Rushdy
- Music by: Robert Khairy Beshara; Tariq Tawakkol
- Distributed by: The Arab Company for Film Production and Distribution
- Release date: June 14, 2006
- Running time: 94 minutes
- Country: Egypt
- Language: Arabic
- Budget: E£4.5 million
- Box office: E£5.144 million

Leisure Time (Arabic: أوقات فراغ, romanized: Awqat Faragh) IPA: [ʔæwˈʔæːt fɑˈɾɑːɣ] is a 2006 Egyptian drama film about a group of youths from different social classes and their experiences growing up and dealing with drugs and sex. It was written by Omar Gamal and Mohamed Moqbel and directed by Mohammed Moustafa. Prouduced by Hussein El-Kalla and Isaad Younis, the film was the first appearance for actors Ahmed Hatem, Karim Kassem and Amr Abed.

Leisure Time is a modern, realistic experience worthy of study by filmmakers and those interested in Egyptian cinema. It deals with the issues of young people and teenagers in the rich and middle class in Egypt at the present time, through the stories of a group of friends. The film was authoring, written, scripted and acted by a group of young people, most of whom were new faces, which led some to expect that the film would not achieve the expected revenues. However, the film achieved good revenues (E£5.144 million against E£4.5 million budget), and most of its audience consisted of young people and teenagers.

== Synopsis ==
A group of Middle Class youths, some of whom are liberal and some conservative, all live lives filled with troubles. They make decisions that will impact their futures. The film starts and ends in an amusement park and in between, the group tries to achieve their dreams but learn the harsh realities of life and many other things.

== Cast ==
- Randa El-Behairy as Menna
- Ahmed Hatem as Hazem
- Karim Kassem as Amr
- Amr Abed as Ahmed
- Ahmed Hadad as Tarek
- Safaa Tag El-Din as Mai
- Hanan Youssef as Ahmed's Mother
- Mohammed Abu Dawud as Menna's Father
- Tarek El-Telmissany as Hazem's Father
- Khalil Morsy Ahmed's Father
- Muhammad Mamdouh as Hazem's brother
