= Karim Kassem =

Egyptian actor (born 1986)

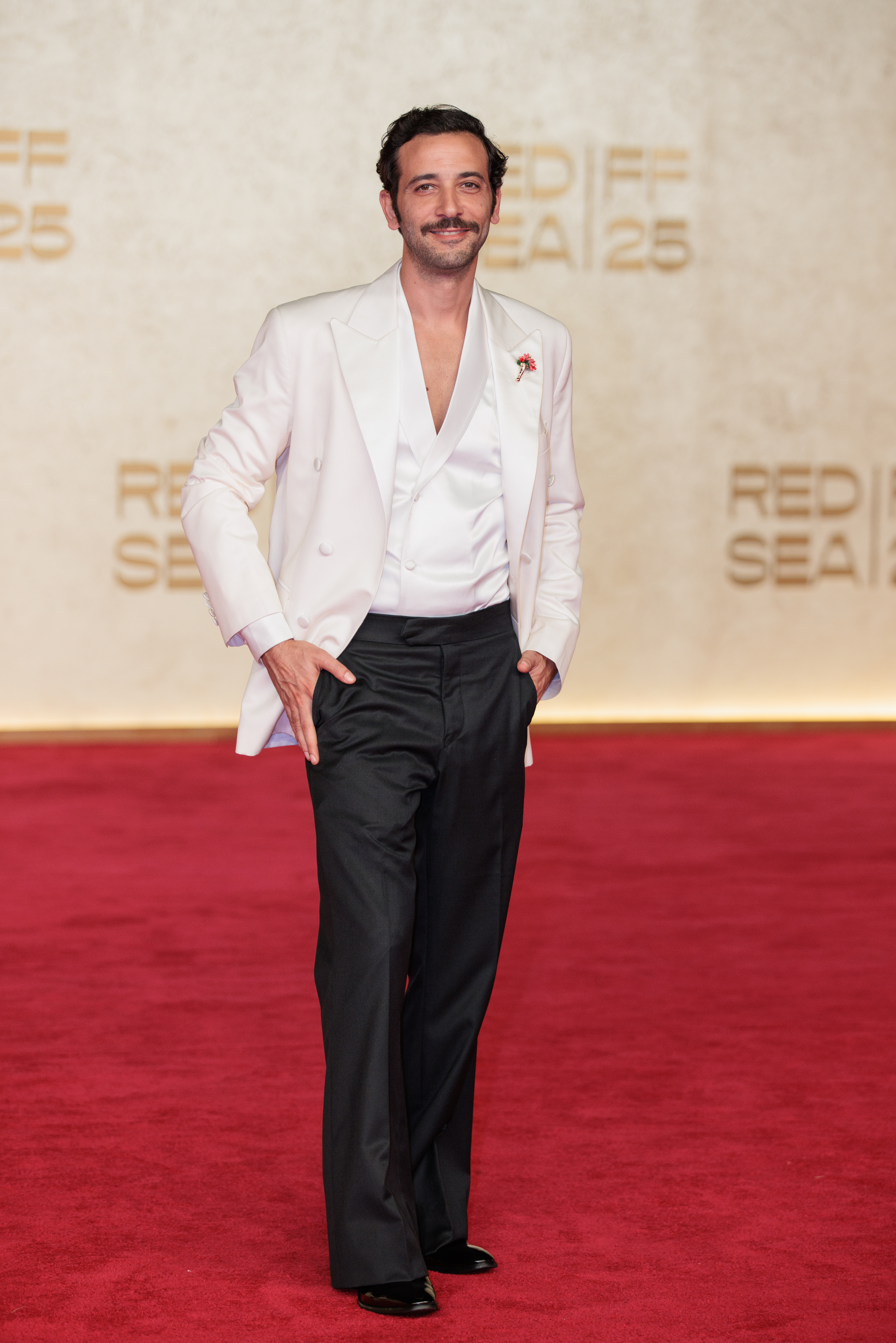
- Karim Kassem 2025
- Born: Karim Ahmed Kassem; 8 October 1986 (age 39); Cairo, Egypt
- Education: American University in Cairo
- Occupation: Actor
- Years active: 2006–present

Karim Ahmed Kassem (Arabic: كريم أحمد قاسم, Kareem Ahmad Qassem, Egyptian Arabic: [kæɾˈiːm ʔæːsem], also spelled Karim Assem; born 8 October 1986) is an Egyptian actor.

== Biography ==
Karim was born on 8 October 1986 in Cairo, Egypt. He is a Muslim himself though had a multi-faith religious upbringing celebrating all Jewish, Christian and Muslim holidays as a child. His late mother was Jewish and his father is a Muslim and is from both Islamic and Christian faith heritage. His paternal grandfather was Muslim and his paternal grandmother was a Christian. His maternal grandfather was a Jewish anti-Zionist who refused to immigrate to Israel, believing Zionism to be a "racist" movement. His maternal grandfather was a prominent Egyptian nationalist.

He is a graduate of the American University in Cairo, where he studied theatre and acted in many of the university's plays. He is trilingual in Egyptian Arabic (also Standard Arabic), French and English.

Discovered in 2006 while taking an acting workshop, he had his cinematic breakthrough in the teen drug film Awqat Faragh meaning "Spare time". Kassem has co-starred with colleague Amr Abed in three of his films.

== Filmography ==
Year	Film	Translation	Role	Note
2006	أوقات فراغ; Awqat Faragh	Leisure Time	Amr	
2007	الماجيك el-Magic	The Magic	Mustafa	
2007	To Each His Own Cinema		Young Youssef Chahine	In 47 ans après (47 Years Later)
2009	بالألوان الطبيعية; Bel-Alwan el-Tabe'eya	True Colors	Youssef	
2011	إي.يو.سي; E.U.C	E.U.C	Omar	
2012	مصور قتيل; Mosawar Qatil	Snapshot	Guest appearance	
2014	The First Line (Promakhos)		Amit	
2014	بتوقيت القاهرة; Bi-Tawqit al-Qahira	Cairo Time	Wael	
2015	أولاد رزق; Awlad Rizq	Sons of Rizk	Ramadan	
2016	كدبة كل يوم; Kedbet Koll Youm	A Lie for Everyday	Seif	
2017	سمكة وصنارة; Samaka we Senara		Mostafa	
2018	ليل/خارجي; Leil/Karegy	Night/Ext	Mohamed Abdel El-hady (Mo)	
2019	أولاد رزق ٢: عودة أسود الأرض; Awlad Rizq 2: Awdet Eswood El-Ard	Sons of Rizk 2: The Return of the Lions of Earth	Ramadan	
2019	Sawah			

== Television ==
Year	Show	Translation	Role	Note
2009	خاص جدا; Khas Geddan	Top Secret	Moataz	
2010	الجماعة; Al-Gama'a	The Brotherhood	Teymur	
2012	الهروب el-Horoub	The Escape	Ahmed Abd El-Naser	
2014	كلام علي ورق; Kalam Ala Waraq	Words on Paper	Marawan	Starring Haifa Wehbe
2015	الكابوس el-Kabous	The Nightmare	Faris	
2015	البيوت اسرار el-Beyout Asrar	Houses of secrets	Seif	
2017	شاش في قطن; Shash X Qotn	Gauze in Cotton	Dr. Jean	
2017	The State		Abu Akram	Broadcast in Britain by Channel 4

== Theatre ==
Year	Show	Translation	Role	Note
2013	قالولي هنا; Qalouli Hena	They Told Me Here		Mime play
