= Sons of Rizk =

- Film poster
- Welad Rizk
- Directed by: Tarek Al Eryan
- Starring: Ahmed Ezz; Amr Youssef; Ahmed El-Fishawy
- Music by: Hesham Nazih
- Release date: 17 July 2015
- Country: Egypt
- Language: Arabic

Sons of Rizk (Arabic: Welad Rizk) is a 2015 Egyptian action film directed by Tarek Al Eryan.

== Cast ==
- Ahmed Ezz - Reda Rizk
- Amr Youssef - Rabia' Rizk
- Ahmed El-Fishawy - Atef
- Karim Kassem - Ramadan Rizk
- Ahmed Dawood - Ragab Rizk
