= Jamila Awad =

Egyptian actress (born 1991)

- جميلة عوض
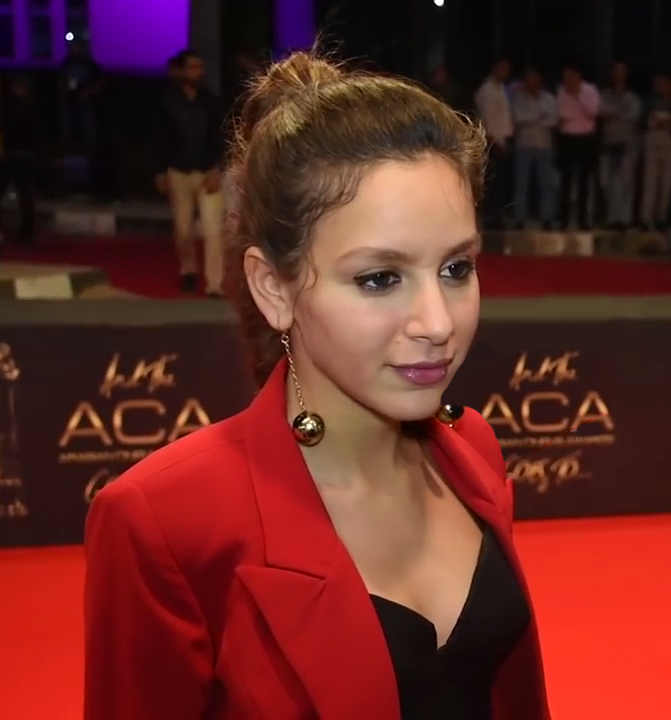
- Born: Jamila Adel Mohamed Awad Youssef; 6 April 1991 (age 35); Cairo, Egypt
- Education: The British University in Egypt; MSA University
- Father: Adel Awad

Jamila Adel Mohamed Awad Youssef (Arabic: جميلة عادل محمد عوض يوسف; born 6 April 1991) is an Egyptian actress. She gained attention after her debut in the 2015 television series Under Control.

== Early life ==
Jamila Awad was born in Cairo and was raised in an artistic family. Her father is film director Adel Awad, her mother is half-Egyptian half-Lebanese actress Randa Awad. She is also the granddaughter of the renowned Egyptian actor and comedian Mohamed Awad. She enrolled at the October University for Modern Sciences and Arts (MSA) in Cairo, where she studied media, and also briefly studied political science at The British University in Egypt before ultimately pursuing media studies at MSA.

== Career ==
Jamila Awad directed one of singer and actress Nesma Mahgoub's music videos and appeared in the television series Under Control (Taht Al Saytara) alongside actress Nelly Karim in which she played the role of Hania. The series aired during Ramadan 2015.

In 2016 Jamila Awad made an appearance in the film Hepta: The Last Lecture. The Last Lecture achieved the distinction of becoming the highest-grossing romantic film in the history of the Egyptian box office. In 2017, she resumed her career in television with a role in the series La Tutfi' Al-Shams, an adaptation of a classic film of the same name. In this series, Jamila reprised the role originally played by the actress Faten Hamama, portraying a teenage girl who falls in love with her married teacher.

Her international breakthrough occurred with the 2018 thriller The Guest, which had its world premiere at the Tallinn Black Nights Film Festival in Estonia, where it was awarded the Audience Award. In the film, Awad portrays a young woman who falls in love with a religious extremist and invites him to meet her family, unaware of his vengeful intentions toward her father. For her performance in this role, Jamila was awarded the Best African-Asian Actress Award at the New Vision International Film Festival in the Netherlands. This marked her first international accolade, following numerous local honors, including the Dear Guest Award for Best Rising Actress and recognition from the Arab Academy for Science, Technology, and Maritime Transport as a role model for youth for her contributions to the arts.

She made her first foray into comedy with her performance in the film Sabaa Al-Boromba, a commercial success during the Eid al-Fitr season in 2019.

In 2020 Jamila Awad starred in the film High School Girls, which achieved considerable commercial success. Film critic Tarek El Shennawy offered a flattering assessment of the film, characterizing it as "a courageous endeavor that transcends the conventional boundaries of mainstream cinematic productions." In recognition of her performance, Awad was presented with the Dear Guest Award for Best Young Film Actress.

She participated in a panel at the 41st Cairo International Film Festival. She also served as a jury member for the Student Films Competition at the Alexandria Short Film Festival.

In her second leading role, Awad portrayed Nour, a patient with vitiligo, in Lazem A'eesh (I Have to Live), the sixth story from the series Except Me. Elle Arabia featured her on its cover, portraying her character from the series. Additionally, she was awarded the Best Young Actress accolade at the Arab Stars Festival for her performance.

Awad took part in a UNICEF campaign alongside numerous Egyptian and international artists, including Mona Zaki. The objective of this campaign was to enhance awareness of children's rights on a global scale and within the Arab region.

In 2021 she participated in "1000 Girls 1000 Dreams" workshop for football coaches.

In 2025 she was a face of Armani Beauty.

== Filmography ==
=== Films ===
Year	Title	Role	Ref
2016	Hepta: The Last Lecture	Dina	
2016	30 Years Ago	Noha	
2016	Laf W Dawaran	Jumana	
2018	The Guest	Farida	
2019	Saba'a El-Bromba	Nesma	
2020	High School Girls	Sally Sameh	
2021	My Bride	Dalila	
2021	The Court	Alia	

=== Television ===
Year	Title	Role	Ref
2015	Under Control	Hania	
2016	Garemt Shaghaf	Shams	
2017	La Tutfi' Al-Shams	Aya	
2020	Except Me	Nour	
2021	Harb Ahlya	Tmara	
