= Yosra El Lozy =

Egyptian actress (born 1985)

- يسرا اللوزي
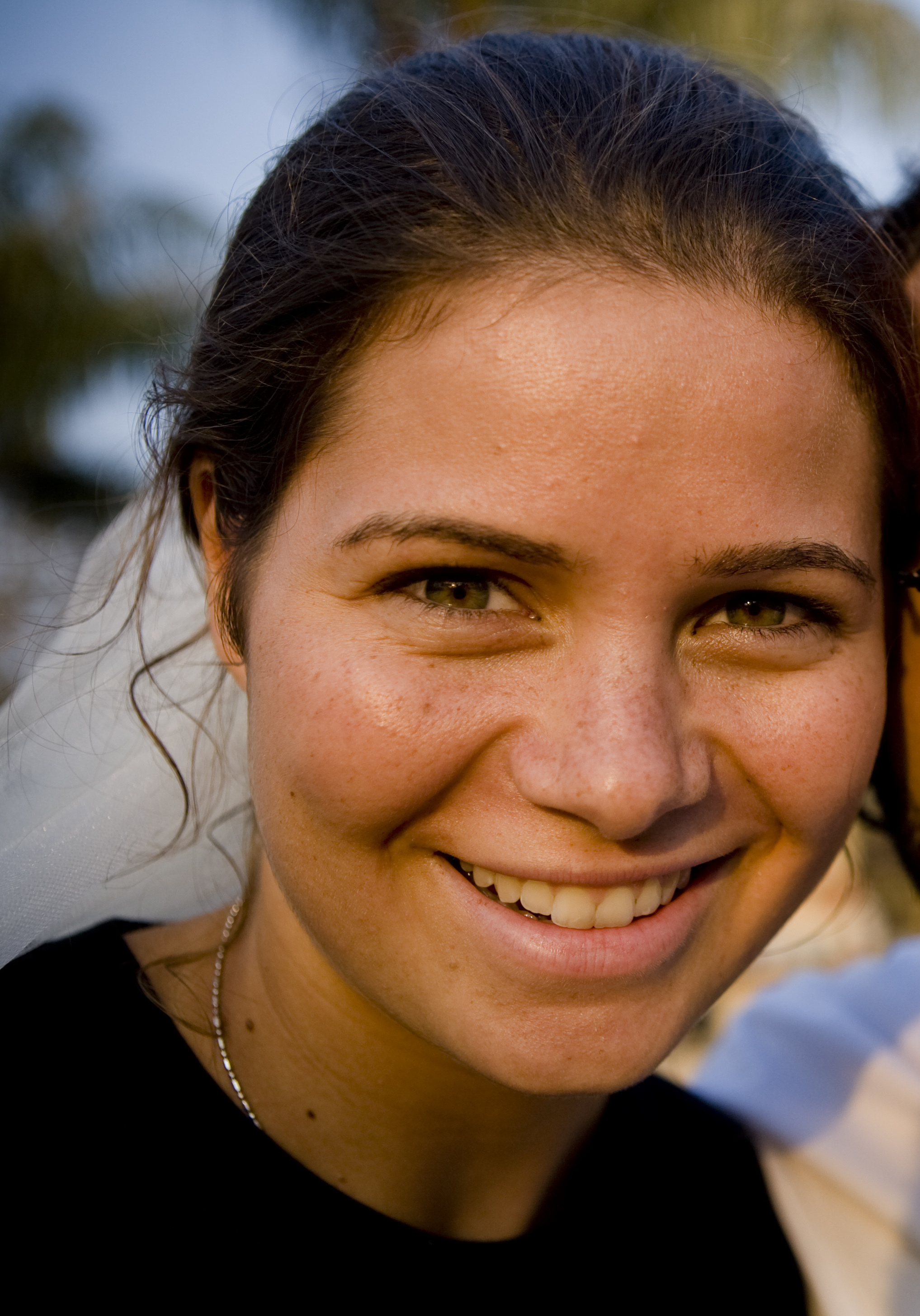
- Yosra El Lozy in 2008
- Born: Yosra Mahmoud El Lozy يسرا محمود اللوزي; August 8, 1985 (age 41); Cairo, Egypt
- Occupations: Ballerina, actress and television personality
- Years active: 2004–present
- Height: 1.72 m (5 ft 7 1/2 in)
- Spouse: Ahmed El Drouby (m. 2009)
- Children: 2

Yosra Mahmoud El Lozy (Arabic: يسرا محمود اللوزي, IPA: [ˈjosɾɑ lˈloːzi]; born August 8, 1985) is an Egyptian actress. She has received many awards from regional and international film festivals. She has won various awards for her acting in Qobolat Masrouqa (2008), Bel-Alwan el-Tabe'eya (2009), Heliopolis (2010) and Microphone (2011). She has also provided voice dubbing in Arabic for several films and television series.

== Early life and family ==
Yosra was born in 1985 to an Egyptian father and a Syrian mother. She majored in Political science at AUC and minoring in Theatre and Modern History. She has acted in many AUC Theatre productions such as “A Silly Goose”, “The Sultan’s Dilemma”, “Sulayman EL Halabi” and the “Reader”.

During her childhood, she enjoyed playing football, swimming, and ballet dancing.

== Career ==
Her professional acting debut was with director Youssef Chahine in Alexandria... New York where she played the role of young "Ginger" while she was only sixteen years old. Many critics argue that having a movie by the legendary Youssef Chahine on her resume is a responsibility and should have other respectable movies to follow.

Of course that was a great experience I was 16 years old when I made “Alexandria... New York” and my parents had to be very supportive, thank God they were. I decided to focus on my studies the four years that followed this movie but I didn’t mind taking a few looks at some scripts, unfortunately nothing was tempting. When I was offered the role in “Bel-Alwan el-Tabe'eya”, I couldn’t believe that Osama Fawzy chose me when he saw “Alexandria... New York”, that proves the theory wrong of when an actor is off-screen for a long time he is forgotten. An actor is chosen if he fits into the role not because he is seen a lot on screens and I want people to choose me for that purpose not because I look good. I didn’t become an actress to be around flashlights, that’s not me; I act for the pleasure of it.

With roles in “Stolen Kisses” and “Bel-Alwan el-Tabe'eya” alongside her young fellow actors, Yosra believes that her generation is filled with young cinematic potential that will rise full force to introduce a new generation of Egyptian film. She said that her generation is fed up with the same old plots and techniques, they don’t want the story of girl meets a boy with the soundtrack in the background.

In "Bel-Alwan el-Tabe'eya", Yosra played the role of a girl who suffers from an inner conflict and is indecisive on choosing between the guy she loves and her religious beliefs. Her character reflects a number of young women in our society who face daily tribulations thinking about the right path to take in their lives.

In 2009, she shared the experience of acting in independent movies and appeared in ‘Heliopolis’ by young director Ahmad Abdalla alongside Khaled Abol Naga, Hanan Motawie and Hany Adel. This year, the cast of ‘Heliopolis’ is gathered on set once more to bring us ‘Microphone’ a co-production between Mohamed Hefzy and Khaled Abo El Naga, which was awarded Best Arab Movie at Cairo International Film Festival and the Tanit d'or at the Carthage Film Festival.

In 2010, Yosra appeared in some smaller parts on TV and cinema, She has earned her some major parts on TV series like “Al-Gama'a” when she played Cherine, a patriotic TV presenter in which was the talk of the Arab Region, due to its great production quality, well-written plot and controversy. She also appeared in the award-winning film “Microphone” by young director Ahmad Abdalla as well as the romantic comedy “Ezaet Hob” alongside Menna Shalabi, that was released in 2011. Yosra is playing ‘Farida’, a hip energetic girl who is the total opposite of her conservative best friend Leila played by Menna Shalabi who tries to find love throughout the movie.

I liked the plot a lot as we want to prove that friends don’t have to share the same views to be close. I have friends who would go to the beach wearing a swimsuit and I have others who don’t wear one as they’re more conservative, but at the end, all of us are in the same group and we all get together and know how to have a good conversation”, Yosra explains. “The movie also tackles the high tech communication via Blackberry and Facebook and how they interfere in romantic relationships, which resulted in some very funny scenes.

== Personal life ==
After five years of marriage, she gave birth to her first daughter Dalilah in 2014. Yosra rejected many roles after giving birth to her baby girl. She only consent to The X Factor program because she can escort Delilah with her on the bus (caravan) so she can breastfeed her as the crew was very understanding. In 2020, she had her second daughter, Nadia.

== Political views ==
Yosra describes herself as Nasserist. She has participated in many demonstrations. One of them was because of Lebanese Civil War as she demanded the expulsion of the Israeli ambassador from Egypt.

In 2011, she participated in the Egyptian revolution that toppled late Egyptian President Hosni Mubarak. She said in a street interview

There is a corrupt system, and we should all be against it, whether we are rich or poor.

== Filmography ==
Film
Year	Film	Translation	Notes
2004	Iskendria - New York	Alexandria... New York	The film screened in the Un Certain Regard section at the 2004 Cannes Film Festival
2008	Qobolat Masrouqa	Stolen Kisses	Won—Best actress from Alexandria International Film Festival. Won—Horeyyaty Magazine Award
2009	Bel-Alwan el-Tabe'eya	True Colours	Won—Best actress from International Film Festival Rotterdam.
2009	Bas fi haga Na'sa	Missed Something	Documentary Film
2010	Heliopolis	Heliopolis	Won—Best First Screenplay Award from Sawiris Foundation. Won—Best actress Cairo International Film Festival. Won—Best actress Alexandria International Film Festival. Nominated—Middle East International Film Festival. Nominated—Toronto International Film Festival. Nominated—Thessaloniki International Film Festival in Greece. Nominated—Vancouver International Film Festival. Nominated—International Film Festival of Marrakech in Morocco. Nominated—Festival International du Film d'Amour de Mons in Brussels, Belgium. Nominated—International Film Festival of Kerala.
2010	El Ostaz Ehsan	Mr. Ehsan	
2010	Sehr El Eshq	The Charming of Love	
2010	Noqtat An-Nour	Point of Enlightenment	
2011	Microphone	Microphone	Won—Best First Screenplay Award from Sawiris Foundation. Won—Best Arabic-language film Award from Cairo International Film Festival. Won—Best Film from Alexandria International Film Festival. Won—Tanit d'or from Journées cinématographiques de Carthage. Won—Best Editing Award from Dubai International Film Festival. Nominated—Toronto International Film Festival. Nominated—London International Film Festival. Nominated—Thessaloniki International Film Festival. Nominated—International Film Festival of Marrakech in Morocco. Nominated—Festival International du Film d'Amour de Mons in Brussels, Belgium. Nominated—International Film Festival of Kerala.
2011	El Markeb	The Boat	
2011	Ezaet Hob	Love Radio	
2012	Banat El'Am	Sisters In Law	
2013	Hatooli Ragel	I Need A Man	
2016	The Fourth Pyramid	The Fourth Pyramid	
2016	Hassan Wa Bo'loz	Hassan And Bo'loz	
2017	Akhlaa Elabid	Slaves' Manners	
2022	The Spider	The Spider	
Television
Year	Title	Translation	Role
2009	Khas Gidan	So Private	
2010	Tesonamy	Tesonamy	
2010	El-Gamaa'a	The Group	Cherine
2010	Lahazat Harega II	Critical Moments (Part 2)	Shaza
2011	Muhammad Ali	Muhammad Ali	
2011	Embratoreyet Meem	M Empire	
2012	Vertigo	Vertigo	Nadia
2012	Lahazat Harega III	Critical Moments (Part 3)	Shaza
2012	Khotoot Hamraa	Red Lines	Salma
2013	Adam Wa Gamila	Adam & Gamila	Gamila
2014	Dahsha	Surprise	Nema El Pasha
2015	Lahfa	Lahfa	Herself "Guest of honour"
2016	Banat Superman	Superman's Daughters	ِAya
