= My Bride =

2015 Egyptian film

- Directed by: Mohamed Bakir
- Written by: Mostafa El-Barbary
- Produced by: Ihab el-Sergani
- Starring: Ahmed Hatem; Jamila Awad
- Release date: 22 September 2021
- Country: Egypt
- Language: Arabic

My Bride (Arabic: عروستي) is a 2021 Egyptian romantic comedy film directed by Mohamed Bakir and written by Mostafa El-Barbary. The film stars Ahmed Hatem and Jamila Awad. It was produced by Ihab el-Sergani. The movie was released for streaming on Netflix.

== Cast ==
- Ahmed Hatem as Sherif Canary
- Jamila Awad as Dalila El Zakzoki
- Sabreen as Dalila's mother
- Mahmoud El Bezzawy as Sherif's father
- Zeinab Ghareeb as Carmen, Dalila's friend
