= Night/Ext =

2018 film directed by Ahmad Abdalla

- Film poster
- Directed by: Ahmad Abdalla
- Written by: Sherif el Alfy
- Starring: Karim Kassem
- Release dates: 8 September 2018 (TIFF); 30 November 2018 (Egypt)
- Running time: 95 minutes
- Country: Egypt
- Language: Arabic

Night/Ext is a 2018 Egyptian drama film directed by Ahmad Abdalla. It was screened in the Contemporary World Cinema section at the 2018 Toronto International Film Festival. Sherif Desoky won the award for Best Actor at the 40th Cairo International Film Festival for his role in the film.

== Cast ==
- Karim Kassem as Moe
- Mona Hala as Toto
- Sherief El Desouky as Mustafa
- Ahmad Magdy as Magdi
