= 4 Mots sur un piano =

Single by Patrick Fiori, Jean-Jacques Goldman and Christine Ricol

from the album Si on chantait plus fort
- B-side: "N'oublie pas"
- Released: 20 July 2007
- Recorded: France
- Genre: Pop
- Length: 4:23
- Label: RCA
- Songwriter: Jean-Jacques Goldman
- Producers: Patrick Hampartzoumian; Patrick Fiori

Patrick Fiori singles chronology
"Toutes les peines" (2006)	"4 Mots sur un piano" (2007)

Jean-Jacques Goldman singles chronology
"Et l'on n'y peut rien" (2003)	"4 Mots sur un piano" (2007)	"La Promesse" (2011)

"4 Mots sur un piano" is a 2007 song recorded by French singers Patrick Fiori, Jean-Jacques Goldman, who also had written the lyrics, and Christine Ricol. It was released as the second single - after "Toutes les peines" - from Fiori's album Si on chantait plus fort on July 20, 2007. The single was very successful, particularly in France where it topped the chart.

== Background, lyrics and music video ==
Fiori explained in an interview: "One day in Corsica, when I went to Bastia, Jean-Jacques Goldman asked me if I would possibly agree to sing with him. Then, in the Restonica, we met a young girl absolutely unknown named Christine, and the idea of a trio became imperative." He also noted that the song is sad.

The song was produced by Patrick Fiori. It also available on Fiori's best of, 4 Mots, and on many French compilations, such as NRJ Back 2 School 2, NRJ Music Awards 2008 and Hit Connection - Best Of 2007.

The three actors who portrayed the singers in the music video for "4 Mots sur un piano".

Composed by Jean-Jacques Goldman, the song is a ballad that deals with the theme of a romantic relationship between two men and one woman. This relationship, initially accepted by all three people, is challenged by the two men who ask the woman to choose between them. She prefers to not choose because she loves both and finally leaves them.

The music video, directed by Wissam Smayra, takes place in a room in which, at first, the three people move in (these people are not the singers, but actors). They get along well, sharing all the happy moments. However, throughout the video, an uneasiness settles upon them as a result of this relationship that becomes exclusive and finally, they argue violently. In the end, the room is completely empty.

== Charts performances ==
In France, the single went straight to number 5 on July 28, 2007, and jumped to number one two weeks later, with about 17,000 copies sold that week. It stayed there for two consecutive weeks. After that, it dropped slowly and managed to total 17 weeks in the top ten, 24 weeks in the top 50 and 32 weeks in the top 100. Certified Silver disc three months after its release by the SNEP for about 175,000 sales, it was the fifth best-selling single of 2007 in France (163,179 were sold in 2007). It was the second number-one single for Patrick Fiori (after "Belle" in 1998), and also for Jean-Jacques Goldman (after "Je te donne" in 1986).

In Belgium (Wallonia), the single was charted for 19 weeks in the top 40, from September 8, 2007. After a debut at the bottom of the chart, it reached its peak position of number seven in its eighth week. The single was ranked 60th on the 2007 Belgian year-end chart.

In Switzerland, the single started at number 67 on the Swiss Singles Chart on August 26, and peaked at number 40 two weeks later. It fell off the chart after 15 weeks.

== Track listings ==
CD single

No.	Title	Length
1.	"4 mots sur un piano"	4:23
2.	"N'oublie pas" (by Patrick Fiori)	3:43

Digital download

No.	Title	Length
1.	"4 mots sur un piano"	4:23

== Charts ==
=== Peak positions ===
Chart (2007)	Peak position
Belgian (Wallonia) Singles Chart	7
Eurochart Hot 100	6
French Digital Chart	4
French SNEP Singles Chart	1
Swiss Singles Chart	40

=== Year-end charts ===
Chart (2007)	Position
Belgian (Wallonia) Singles Chart	60
French Airplay Chart	24
French Digital Chart	25
French Singles Chart	5
French TV Airplay Chart	64

== Certifications ==
Region	Certification	Certified units/sales
France (SNEP)	Gold	200,000^{*}
^{*} Sales figures based on certification alone.
