= Al Arabia Cinema Production & Distribution =

Egyptian film company

- Industry: Film
- Founded: 2000
- Headquarters: Cairo, Egypt
- Key people: Essaad Youniss
- Subsidiaries: Renaissance Cinemas

Al Arabia Cinema Production & Distribution (ACPD) (Arabic: العربية للإنتاج والتوزيع السينمائي) is an Egyptian film distribution and production company based in Cairo, Egypt, with an Emirati office in Dubai, United Arab Emirates. Founded in 2000, it has distribution networks spanning the Arab region. It owns Renaissance Cinemas operating 21 cinemas in Egypt covering 99 screens. It is a member of the Mediterranean Distribution Network. Al Arabia produced and distributed over 100 movies. The current head of Al Arabia is actress Essaad Youniss.

== Films ==
- Black February (2013)
- 7elm Azez (2012)
- Midnight Party (2013)
- Cima Ali Baba (2011)
- Tak Tak Boom (2011)
- Zhaymer (2010)
- La Targoa Wala Esteslam (2010)
- Benteen mn Masr (2010)
- Heliopolis (2010)
- Birds Of The Nile (2010)
- Walad W Bent (2010)
- Messages from the Sea (2010)
- Ahasees (2010)
- Amir Al Behar (2009)
- Adrenaleen (2009)
- Teer Enta (2009)
- Uncensord (2009)
- Best Friends (2009)
- Micano (2008)
- H Daboor (2008)
- Captin Hima (2008)
- A'in Shams (2008)
- Feminie Moments (2008)
- El Balad De Feha Hokouma (2008)
- Khareg Ala El - Kanoun (2008)
- Al Magic (2007)
- Al Bilatshou (2007)
- Shikamara (2007)
- Hosh Elly Weq' Mnk (2007)
- Al Shayateen (2007)
- Amalet Khasa (2007)
- 45 youm (2006)
- Wesh Egram (2006)
- Fe Mahtet Masr (2006)
- Abdo Mawsem (2006)
- Wahed Mn El Nas (2006)
- Awa't Faragh (2006)
- Lielt Skoot Bagdad (2005)
- Ali Spicey (2005)
- Abu Ali (2005)
- Ma'lesh Ehna Bntbhdel (2005)
- Sleepless nights (2003)
- Aez Ha'y (2003)
- Al Ragol Al Abeed Al Motwaset (2002)
- Mozakerat Moraheka (2002)
- Borkan Al Ghadab (2002)
- Howa Fe Eh? (2002)
- Ameer Al Zalam (2002)
- Mohamy Khola' (2002)
- Rendez-vous (2001)
- Gala - Gala (2001)
- Law Kan Dah Helm (2001)
- Afroto (2001)
- Shaba Ala Al Hawa (2001)
- Ashab Wala Business (2001)
- Rehlat Hob (2001)
- Mowaten w Mokhber w Haramy (2001)
- Ga'na Al Bayan Al Taly (2001)
- Al Labees (2001)
- EL-Sellem W EL-Te3ban (2001)
- Africano (2001)
- Shagea' Al Cima (2000)
- Baheb Al Cima (2000)
- Badr (2000)
- Short w Fanela w Cap (2000)
- Film Thakafy (2000)
- Al Saher (2000)
- Al Agenda Al Hamra (2000)
- Girls Secrets (2000)
- Rasha Grea' (2000)
- Alshan Rabna Yahbak (1999)
