= 122 (film) =

2019 Psychological horror film

- Directed by: Yasir Al Yasiri
- Written by: Salah Algoheny
- Produced by: Saif Oraibi
- Starring: Ahmed El-Fishawy; Amina Khalil; Tarek Lotfi; Ahmed Dawood
- Cinematography: Ahmed Kardous
- Edited by: Amr Akef
- Music by: Saif Oraibi
- Production company: Maqam Productions [eg]
- Distributed by: Misr International Films and Starship
- Release date: 2 January 2019
- Running time: 93 minutes
- Country: Egypt
- Language: Egyptian Arabic

122 is a 2019 Egyptian psychological horror film directed by Yasir Al Yasiri and written by Salah Al-Goheny, and produced by Saif Oraibi. The film is the first Egyptian film to be shot in 4DX technology. In Egypt calling 122 is in the emergency situation (the equivalent of calling 911 in the US or 999 in the UK.).

== Plot ==
The film that follows the story of Nasr (Ahmed Dawood) and Omnia (Amina Khalil) who are in love, they're married as well. The problem is since they couldn't afford a proper wedding they snuck off and eloped. They are trying to keep their marriage a secret until they can afford it. Unfortunately, Omnia has become pregnant, something scandalous for an unmarried woman in their culture. In order to come up with the money quickly, Nasr returns to his shady past, agreeing to transport a package of drugs for an old associate. Omnia insists on coming along. Their car gets hit by a bus and they wake up in intensive care in what appears to be a hospital in the middle of nowhere. The couple faces a catastrophe there, and attempt to escape and run for their lives.

== Release ==
The movie was released in Egypt on 2 January 2019, then a week later it was released worldwide. The film was a blockbuster in the Egyptian Box Office topping the box office for a month, hitting in Egypt alone 24,808,161 Egyptian Pounds The movie marked a new record in the international distribution being the first Egyptian film to be dubbed into Urdu and releasing in Pakistan.

The film then was digitally released on Netflix and was named as one of the iconic Arabic movies coming to Netflix

== Cast ==
- Ahmed El-Fishawy as Amgad
- Amina Khalil as Omnia
- Tarek Lutfi as Dr. Nabil
- Ahmed Dawood as Nasr
- Mohamed Mamdouh as Emad
- Mohamed Hagazy as Mohammed
- Jehan Khalil as Samar
- Sabri Abdul Moneim as Sameeh
- Asmaa Galal as Ragaa
- Mohamed Lutfi as Policeman
- Tara Emad as Suaad
- Mahmoud Basheer as Gahfeer
