= Sheikh Jackson =

2017 film

- Film poster
- Directed by: Amr Salama
- Written by: Amr Salama; Omar Khaled
- Starring: Ahmed El Fishawy; Ahmed Malek; Maged El Kedwany
- Production companies: Film-Clinic; Cleopatra Entertainment; IProductions; Rotana TV; The Producers Films
- Distributed by: Rotana Studios
- Release date: 11 September 2017 (TIFF)
- Running time: 93 minutes
- Country: Egypt
- Language: Egyptian Arabic

Sheikh Jackson is a 2017 Egyptian drama film directed by Amr Salama. It was screened in the Special Presentations section at the 2017 Toronto International Film Festival. It was selected as the Egyptian entry for the Best Foreign Language Film at the 90th Academy Awards, but it was not nominated.

== Plot ==
An Islamic cleric who likes to dress as Michael Jackson is thrown into a tailspin in the wake of the singer's death.

== Cast ==
- Ahmed El-Fishawy
- Maged El Kedwany
- Ahmed Malek
- Mahmoud El Bezzawy
- Basma
- Dorra
- Yasmin Raeis
- Salma Abu Deif

== Controversy ==
In December 2017 in Egypt the film was referred to Al-Azhar University for investigation of blasphemy, despite it having been cleared by Egypt's censorship committee. When film critic Tarek El-Shenawy defended the film, many Facebook readers responded with angry insults against him and the film.

== See also ==
- List of submissions to the 90th Academy Awards for Best Foreign Language Film
- List of Egyptian submissions for the Academy Award for Best Foreign Language Film
