= The Outcasts (2023 film) =

- Directed by: Yasser Samy
- Starring: Ahmed Hatem; Tara Emad; Eyad Nassar
- Release date: January 25, 2023
- Country: Egypt
- Language: Arabic

The Outcasts is a 2023 Egyptian comedy sports film directed by Yasser Samy. The film stars Ahmed Hatem, Tara Emad, and Eyad Nassar.

== Cast ==
- Ahmed Hatem as Salah
- Tara Emad as Farida
- Eyad Nassar as Adham
- Mahmoud El Leithy
- Mahmoud El Bezzawy as Gaber
- Taha Desouky
- Moustafa Ghareeb

== Release ==
The Outcasts was released in theaters on January 25, 2023.
