= Hepta: The Last Lecture =

Egyptian movie

- Directed by: Hadi El Bagoury
- Written by: Wael Hamdy; Mohamed Sadeq; Abdelrahman Yasser
- Starring: Amr Youssef; Ahmed Malek; Ahmed Dawood
- Cinematography: Gamal Elboushi
- Edited by: Ahmed Hafez
- Music by: Hesham Nazih
- Release date: April 20, 2016 (Egypt)
- Running time: 112 minutes
- Country: Egypt
- Language: Arabic
- Box office: $10,574

Hepta: The Last Lecture (Arabic: هيبتا) is a 2016 Arabic-language drama film written and directed by Hadi El Bagoury.

== Cast ==
- Amr Youssef as Yusuf
- Ahmed Malek as Karim
- Ahmed Dawood as Rami
- Maged El-Kidwani as Dr. Shukri Mukhtar
- Dina El Sherbiny as Ula
- Jamila Awad as Dina
- Yasmin Raeis as Rua
- Abdullah Azmi as Shady
- Lina Sophia as Child Marwah
- Shereen Reda as Ula
- Nelly Karim as Rua
- Anouchka as Dina's Mother
- Salwa Mohamed Ali as Maryam
- Ahmad Bedair as Abdulhamid Taha
- Kinda Alloush as Amirah
- Hany Adel as Yahya
- Muhammad Farrag as Mahmood el-Derini
- Bassma Yasser as Salma
- Rehab Arafa as Marwah's Mother
- Doaa Mostafa Ragab as School Bus Supervisor Ms. Iman
- Marwa Gebreil as Yahya's Wife
- Aasem Nagaty as Dean Salim
- Ahmed Zaki as Anesthetist
- Aya Samaha as Girl at Lecture

== Reception ==
The film was said to be "one of the highest-grossing romantic films in the history of Egyptian cinema".
