= Adel Awad =

Egyptian director (born 1962)

- عادل عوض
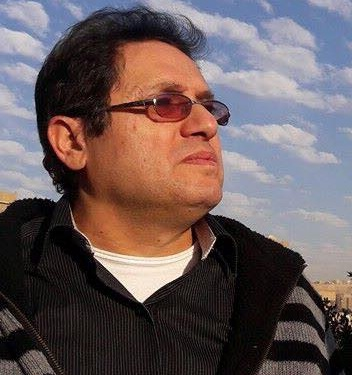
- Born: November 7, 1962 (age 63); Cairo, Egypt
- Education: Higher Institute of Cinema
- Occupation: Director
- Children: Jamila Awad

Adel Awad (born November 7, 1962) is an Egyptian director of films and music videos.

== Early life and education ==
Awad was born on 7 November, 1962 at Cairo.He graduated from the Higher Institute of Cinema in Cairo in 1985.He comes from an artistic family. His father is comedian Mohamed Awad and his brother is actor Alaa Awad. He is married to actress Randa Awad. They have one daughter, actress Jamila Awad. He worked as an assistant director for the 1979 film Shafika and Metwali. He wrote and directed the 1993 film Crystal. He acted in a few films when he was young, including in the 1986 film The Hunger.

== Filmography ==
- Below Zero (1990)
- The Scorpion (1990)
- Crystal (1993)
- Youth on Air (2002)
