= Stolen Kisses (2008 film) =

Qobolat Masrooqa
- Directed by: Khaled El Hagar
- Screenplay by: Ahmed Saleh
- Story by: Dr Abdel Hady Mosbah; Ahmed Saleh
- Produced by: Sayed Abol Saud; Egyptian Media Production City (EMPC); Khaled EL Hagar
- Starring: Yosra El Lozy; Ahmed Azmy; Bassem Samra; Randa El Behery; Mohamed Karim; Nermin Maher; Farah Youssef
- Cinematography: Tamer Josef
- Edited by: Gomaa Abdel Latif
- Production companies: Egyptian Media Production City; Khaled El Hagar
- Distributed by: Egyptian Media Production City
- Release date: October 1, 2008
- Running time: 109 minutes
- Country: Egypt
- Language: Arabic
- Budget: 7 million EGP

Qoboulat Masrouqa is a 2008 Egyptian film directed by Khaled El Hagar and written by Ahmed Saleh. The film stars Yosra El Lozy, Ahmed Azmy, Bassem Samra and Randa El Behery, The film focuses on nine Egyptians in their twenties faced with common, but taboo subjects in Egypt: family conflicts, unemployment, sexual frustration, prostitution and violence. By keeping an Egyptian voice accessible to the larger audience, this 2009 production kicked off many heated debates in Egypt, including death threats.

The film, known for its bold, steamy scenes strayed far from the lines of ‘Clean Cinema’ which, since 1998, had dominated the arts scene in Egypt, imposing new restrictions on freedom of expression. The film narrates the stories of three couples Ahmed Azmy and Yosra El Lozy who loves Ahmed Azmy, but cannot get married lawfully because of the vast class differences between them; the relationship between Farah Yousef and Bassem Samra, which is frustrated by Farah's ambition for a more luxurious life, and Randa El Behery and Mohamed Karim, who strive to make a living, and keep the balance in their relationship.

== Cast ==
- Farah Youssef as Hanan(as Farah Yusuf)
- Ahmed Azmi as Ihab
- Yousra El Lozy as Marwa
- Mohamed Haseeb as Public Prosecutor
- Mohamed Karim as Mohsen
- Nermin Maher as Maya(as Nirmin Maher)
- Basem Samrah as Ezzat(as Bassem Samra)

== Awards ==
The film won eight international acting awards at the 24th Alexandria International Film Festival, the film opened the festival and was in the official competition as well at the Opera house in Alexandria.
