= Ahmed El-Fishawy =

Egyptian actor (born 1980)

Ahmed El Fishawy
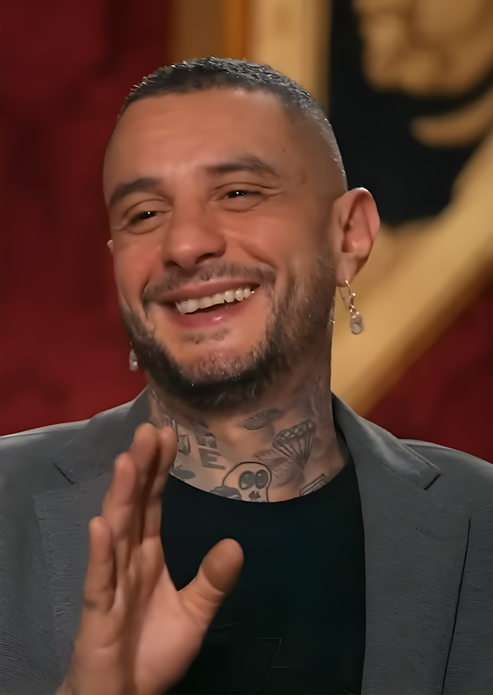
- Born: Ahmed Farouk El-Fishawy; November 11, 1980 (age 45); Cairo, Egypt
- Occupation: Actor
- Years active: 2000–present
- Spouse: Nada Kamel

Ahmed El-Fishawy (Arabic: أحمد الفيشاوي; born 11 November 1980) is an Egyptian actor and son of Egyptian actor Farouk El-Fishawy.

== Career ==
His acting debut was with actress Faten Hamama in Wajh al-Qamar TV-Series. At 23 he starred in Ghosts of Sayala. His first movie was El hassa El sabaa directed by Ahmed Mekky , he starred along side Ahmed Ezz in Sons of Rizk movies 1 and 2 directed by Tarek Alarian.

== Personal life ==
El-Fishawy has been married four times, ending with divorce. His secret marriage with Hend El-Hennawi was a media and social scandal, due to his denial of being the father of their child, Lina. The case was closed after the court order of validation of paternity.

On 22 May 2018, he announced his engagement to Nada Kamel. They held a small and private ceremony on the first of May.

In November 2019, a court ruling was issued to annual a decision which banned Lina from traveling.

In January 2020, El-Fishawy was sentenced to one year in prison, due to his failure to provide child support.

The ruling included one year of prison, bail of £E 2,000, a fine of £E 500, and compensation of £E 20,000 and £E 50,000 for attorneys and other expenses.

== Filmography ==
=== Films ===
- El Hassa El Sab'aa
- Shabab Ala Hawa
- 45 Days
- Waraket Shafra
- Zay El Naharda
- Telk Al Ayam
- 18 Days
- 678
- Wahed Sefr (1,0)
- Sa'aa w nos
- Hatoly Ragel
- Sukkar Mor
- Welad Rizk (2015)
- Monkey talks
- Sheikh Jackson (2017)
- Gunshot (2018)
- 122 (2019)
- Welad Rizk 2 (2019)
- One Day and One Night (2020)
- Al-Harith (2020)
- 1 second (2021) Guest Honor
- March 30 (2021)
- Ritsa (2021)
- Moon 14 (2022)
- General invitation (2022)
- Ghosts of Europe (2022)
- Rahba (2023)
- Adel mesh Adel (2024)
- El-System (2024)

=== Series ===
- Wajh al-Qamar
- El Ama Nour
- Shabab Online
- Hadith Al Sabah wal Masa'
- Afaret El Sayala (Ghosts of Sayala)
- Tamer Wa Shaw'eyyah
- Al-Gama'a (TV series)
- El Tennen (The Dragon)
- Sedna El Sayd
- Bedon Zekr Asma'

=== Music career ===
- Participated in "Waraket Shafra" movie song with "Arabian Nights" band.
- He was a member of «Ghetto Pharoz» rap band.
- started his own records label called "The Crystal Dog" in 2014
- He released "NUMBER 2" song in 2021 which was a diss track on Mohamed Ramadan .
- In 2023 he released his song "Lava" .
