= The Fourth Pyramid =

- الهرم الرابع
- Directed by: Peter Mimi
- Written by: Peter Mimi
- Starring: Ahmed Hatem; Tara Emad; Mirhan Hussein
- Release date: February 3, 2016 (Egypt)
- Running time: 92 minutes
- Country: Egypt
- Language: Arabic

The Fourth Pyramid is a 2016 Egyptian thriller film directed and written by Peter Mimi and starring Ahmed Hatem, Tara Emad, and Mirhan Hussein. The film is the first part of a series of films by Mimi called The Oppressed, which was followed by Mousa in 2021.

== Plot ==
A hospital refuses to help a guy's mother because they needed a sum of money first, which leads to her death. An Egyptian hacker known as "the Fourth Pyramid" then starts taking revenge and becomes the sound of the people.

== Cast ==
- Ahmed Hatem as Yusuf Haggag
- Tara Emad as Nada
- Mirhan Hussein as Rania
- Mohsen Mansour as Detective Gamal
- Mostafa Abu Seriea as Abdullah
- Mahmoud el-Gendy as Ali El Zanaty
- Ahmed Halawa as General Salah Omar
- Reham Abdel Ghafour as Hassanat/Zizi
- Yousuf Shaaban as Yehia
- Mohamed Soliman as Essam Hashad
- Yosra El Lozy as Asya
- Bayoumi Fouad as Marzouk Yehia
