= Adel Karam =

Lebanese actor, comedian and TV presenter

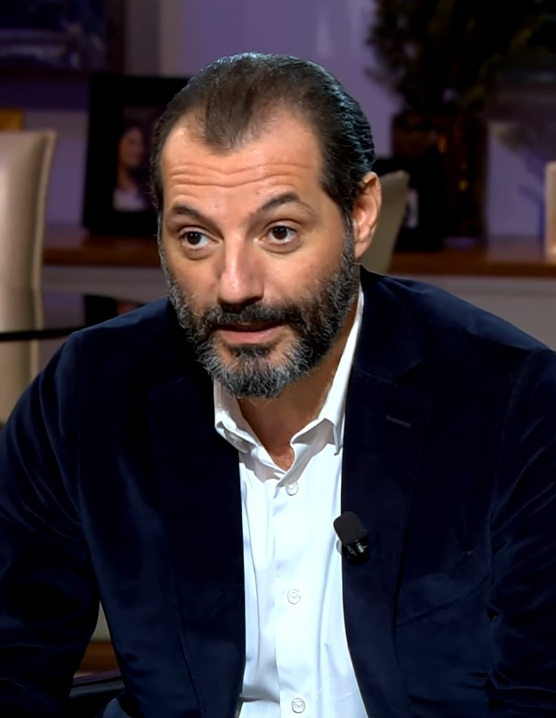
- Adel Karam in 2020
- Born: August 20, 1972 (age 53); Beirut, Lebanon
- Occupations: Actor, comedian and TV presenter
- Years active: 1990s–present
- Spouses: Rita Hanna (m. 2013; div. 2014) Farida Benlatif (m. 2019)
- Children: 2 (Charbel Karam, Kim Karam)

Adel Karam (Arabic: عادل كرم; born 20 August 1972) is a Lebanese actor, comedian and TV presenter.

== Career ==
Karam started his acting career with the comedy show S.L.CHI at MTV Lebanon in 1990s, which later became a film, S.L.Film, in 2000. He later starred in comedy shows such as: La Youmal at Future TV and Mafi Metlo at MTV Lebanon.

He also acted in films and TV series such as: Caramel, Where Do We Go Now?, Diamond Dust, The Insult, Dollar, and Perfect Strangers. In addition, he hosted talk shows: Hayda Haki (2014–2018) and its spiritual successor Beit El Kell.

Adel Karam has been active in various projects, including TV series such as End Point (2024) and Brando el Sharq (2023). He also appeared in Betloo El Rooh (2022) and Perfect Strangers (2022).

== Personal life ==
Karam married Rita Hanna from 2013 to 2014, with whom he had his son Charbel.
