= Dollar (TV series) =

2019 Arabic-language television series

- Promotional poster
- Genre: Action; Drama; Romance
- Starring: Amel Bouchoucha; Adel Karam
- Country of origin: Lebanon
- Original language: Arabic
- No. of seasons: 1
- No. of episodes: 15

Production
- Production company: Cedars Art Production - Sabbah Brothers

Original release
- Network: Netflix
- Release: 8 August 2019

Dollar is a Lebanese Arabic-language television series starring Amel Bouchoucha and Adel Karam. The plot revolves around Tarek, who is given the objective to come up with an idea to make a million dollar to launch of a new bank. It was released on August 8, 2019, on Netflix.

== Cast ==
- Amel Bouchoucha
- Adel Karam

== Release ==
Dollar was released on August 8, 2019, on Netflix.
