= Sherif Desoky =

Egyptian actor (born 1967)

Sherif El Desouky
- شريف الدسوقي
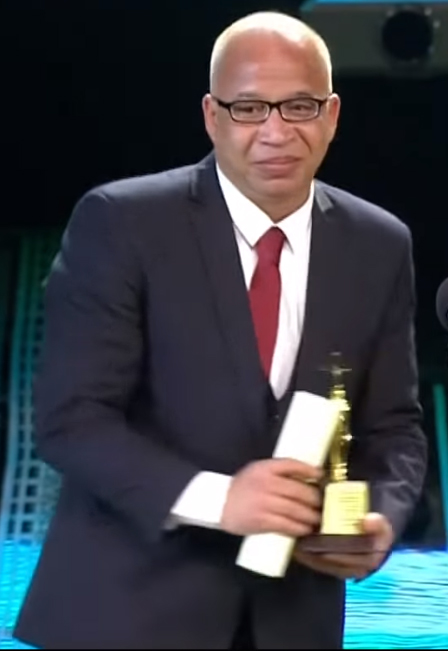
- Desouky in 2018
- Born: Sherif Mohamed El Desouky; 26 November 1967 (age 58); Alexandria, Egypt
- Occupations: Actor, storyteller, comedian
- Years active: 2003–present (Professionally)
- Known for: Acting
- Children: 1 (Adam)
- Awards: Best Actor – Cairo International Film Festival 2018

Sherif Desouky (Arabic: شريف الدسوقي; born 26 November 1967 in Alexandria) is an Egyptian actor, director, author, and storyteller, He is the recipient of the award for Best Actor in Cairo International Film Festival 2018.

== About ==
=== Ismail Yassine's Theater ===
Sherif Desouky was born in Alexandria Governorate, Egypt and his tendencies moved to the theater from a young age, where his father was director of the Ismail Yassin Theater since 1952, He had lived with his father in a family home behind the stage, and despite his father's work in the theater, he refused to enter the art world and struck him in his first appearance on stage. Sharif worked in almost all theater professions as a sound technician and stage technician. But when Ismail Yassine's Theater and the majority of Alexandria's summer theaters were demolished and buildings were built in its place, he left the theater professions and went on to work with palaces of culture and independent teams since 1990.

=== Acting ===
Because of Desouky's knowledge of acting cadres technically adopted by acting professors at the Academy of Arts and the University of Alexandria, and they attached him to many workshops and acting competitions, Sharif entered competitions in the General Authority of Cultural Palaces. He gain experience from his father in addition to his students at the hands of the Egyptian director Youssef Chahine and attending workshops and representative courses in Egypt, Qatar, Germany and Austria.

== Career ==
Desouky started his professional cinematic career in 2003 with limited cinematic experiences, starting with the film (Violence and Irony) directed by Asma El Bakry, the short film (Hawi) and (Hot Dry in Summer), and he also participated in the series (As roses), starring by Youssef El Sherif in 2012.

He got acquainted with the director Ahmed Abdullah Al-Sayed while filming the movie "Microphone" in 2010, and watched his short film "Hawi" to determine Abdullah's nomination for the role of "Mustafa" in the movie "Night/Ext".

Director Kamla Abu Zekry drew the attention of her after she watched an external movie Night/Ext, so she demanded that the producing company for work, Al-Adl Group, be part of the work series of the series "With 100 Faces", which was released in Ramadan 2020, in the role of "Seba'i" as his first major dramatic appearance after his participation in the series "As roses" in 2012, and the series "As roses" in 2019.

Desouky directed several plays, including the play "nothing but", which he presented with "Barah" theater band, as he distinguished in the art of telling, until he became a professional weaver, which led to his excellence in improvisation.

== Filmography ==
=== Series ===
- As roses – 2012 (as Ramadan)
- Touching Shoulders – 2019 (as Abdel-Mongy)
- With 100 faces – 2020 (as Seba'i)
- Kingdom of Eblees – 2020 (as Radwan)
- Behind Nature – 2020 (as The Juggler)

=== Plays ===
- The Come back – 2010
- Nothing But

=== Short films ===
- Road to Italy – 2008 (as Hassan)
- Do that – 2010 (as The Cleaner)
- Zakaria – 2012 (as The Tailor)
- Hot Dry in Summer – 2015 (as The Photographer)
- That's my night – 2019 (as Market Owner)

=== Films ===
- Violence and Irony – 2003
- Hawi – 2010
- Night/Ext – 2018
- 2 Talaat Harb – 2020
- Ferret and human – 2020.
