= Aida Fahmy =

Egyptian political ctivist and unionist (1918-2005)

- عايدة فهمي
- Born: Aida Riad Fahmy El-Qashlawi; March 31, 1917 or 1918; Cairo, Egypt
- Died: 2005
- Occupations: Trade union activist; women's rights activist
- Organization: Shell Oil Company Employees Union – Anglo-Egyptian Oil Wells
- Known for: First Egyptian woman to join a trade union; first female member of the Supreme Advisory Council for Labor

Aida Riad Fahmy El-Qashlawi (March 31, 1917 or 1918 - 2005; Arabic: عايدة فهمي) was an Egyptian women's rights and trade union activist.

== Life ==
Fahmy was born on 31 March in 1917 or 1918 in Cairo.

In 1946, Fahmy became the first Egyptian woman to join a trade union. She joined the Shell Oil Company Employees Union - Anglo-Egyptian Oil Wells, which was later to become El-Nasr Petroleum Company. She eventually rose to secretary-general of the organization. In 1956, she became the first female member of the Supreme Advisory Council for Labor. She helped enshrine equal rights for female workers in collective bargaining agreements.

In 1957 Fahmy made an unsuccessful bid for the Parliament of Egypt. She represented Egypt at the first Petroleum Conference held at the Arab League in 1959. and as a member of the official delegation to the Afro-Asian Solidarity Conference in 1958.

Fahmy died in 2005.
