= Mirhan Hussein =

Egyptian singer and actress (born 1982)

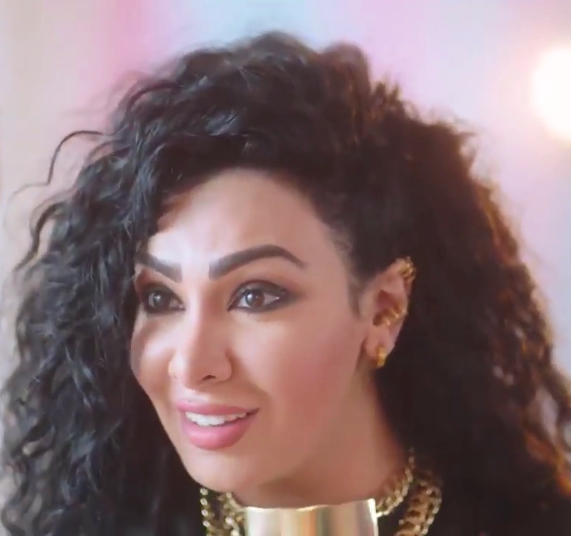
- Mirhan Hussein
- Born: 28 October 1982 (age 44); Cairo, Egypt
- Occupations: Actress, singer
- Years active: 2007–present

Mirhan Hussein Bassyouni Ahmed (Arabic: ميرهان حسين) is an Egyptian singer and actress. She was born in Cairo on 28 October. She gained her popularity through the Arabic version of the reality talent show Star Academy during the 5th season, representing Egypt in 2008. Before Star Academy Mirhan Hussein studied travel and tourism and then worked in an advertising agency. She loves drawing and singing. Her talent is comprehensive as she has proven her ability to sing, dance, act and present programs.

== Career ==
Due to her success on Star Academy 5, Mirhan and 6 other candidates were chosen to be part of the Star Academy Tour.

== Filmography ==
=== Film ===
- The Fourth Pyramid (2016)
