= Bader Saleh =

Yemeni comedy artist

Bader Saleh بدر صالح
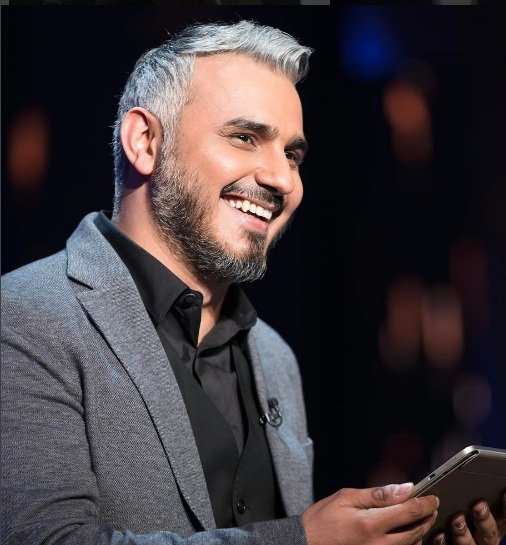
- Born: Badr Saleh Mohammed; May 4, 1984 (age 42); Jeddah, Saudi Arabia
- Education: High school
- Occupations: Comedian, actor, writer
- Known for: EyshElly YouTube show, Tonight With Bader show and Bader show

Bader Saleh (Arabic: بدر صالح); born May 4, 1984, in Jeddah, Saudi Arabia) is a Yemeni comedian. He is the author and presenter of EyshElly YouTube show, Tonight With Bader show and Bader show on YouTube. He earned his fame through his satirical programs on YouTube. His YouTube show EyshElly was rated No. 1 show in Saudi Arabia for more than six years. He also appeared in the "Sheft Al-Layl" TV series in 2012 as guest of honor, in 2015 he became the first person in the Middle East to earn the video-sharing website's highly-coveted Golden Button.

== Early life ==
He was born in Jeddah and lived there. He graduated from high school but did not complete his university studies. His start was through radio but this did not last very long. He started the Arabic-language YouTube show "Eysh Elly", he gained a wide fanbase which made him the selected media face of Dubai tourism festival for the years 2015 and 2016, in (2016–2017) he presented The Tonight Show with Bader Saleh which was broadcast on MBC channel.

In 2012 he announced his marriage to fashion designer Iman Khalid. They were divorced in 2017.

== Career ==
=== TV ===
- Sheft Al-Layl TV series in 2012 as guest of honor.
- The Tonight Show with Bader Saleh 2016–2017.

=== YouTube ===
- EyshElly
- Bader show
