= Escape from the Hidden Castle =

Board game

Escape from the Hidden Castle (also called Midnight Party) is a board game published in 1989 by Ravensburger / Fisher-Price.

== Gameplay ==
Escape from the Hidden Castle is a game in which each player controls guests trying to escape a ghost's birthday party, while the ghost tries to capture them and put them in the wine cellar.

== Reception ==
George Crawshay reviewed Midnight Party for Games International magazine, and gave it a rating of 7 out of 10, and stated that "Not one to shake the world, but certainly recommended for some light hearted entertainment."

== Reviews ==
- Games #97
- 1991 Games 100 in Games
