= Forgetting.com =

2013 Algerian novel

- First edition
- Author: Ahlam Mosteghanemi
- Language: Arabic
- Genre: Novel
- Published: 2009
- Publisher: Dar Nofal
- Publication place: Algeria
- Pages: 335
- OCLC: 784580044

Forgetting.com is a novel by Algerian novelist Ahlam Mosteghanemi. It was published in 2009.

The novel revolves around tips for forgetting a lover. Through this novel, Mosteghanemi tries to provide magical recipes for every female to forget her man. Mosteghanemi prohibited the sale of this novel to men.

Mosteghanemi describes forgetting men as having a super ability to quickly forget, and that the real problem does not lie in relationships in general and only in men, but rather in the way women love, which pushes them to sacrifice anything to keep the man in their lives. Mosteghanemi advises women, saying (Love him as A woman did not love / forget him as men forget) claiming that men are able to forget faster than women.

== Synopsis ==
The novel starts when the heroine Ahlam - the writer herself - meets her friend Camelia, whose man abandoned her. She lives with her, and agrees to call her every day at the same time as the man who abandoned her.

Ahlam calls her friend every day at the same time for two months, and one day they went together to a poetry evening and met by chance the man who had abandoned her friend.

The next day, when Ahlam tried to call her friend, she found the line busy. This made her sure that she had returned to a relationship with that man, so she felt angry and stopped calling.

== Excerpts ==
From the novel:

"There are two types of misery, the first is that you do not get what you wish for, and the second is that it comes to you when you and your wishes have changed after you have been miserable because of them for years.

"They talk behind me because they are already behind me so I don't care.

"Tomorrow from the same place the sun will rise; For as it goes away inside you, it will rise again from you.

"It remains that the ideal treatment for all heart aches is laughter, and not taking memory seriously."
