= Palestinian Revolutionary Left League =

The Palestinian Revolutionary Left League (Arabic: عصبة اليسار الثوري الفلسطيني) was a Palestinian movement. It emerged from a split in the Popular Organization for the Liberation of Palestine in 1969. The organization was primarily based in Syria. One of its key leaders was the lawyer Musa Sweid.

The organization soon disintegrated, with its members joining different Palestinian left-wing factions. On June 9, 1969, the merger of the organization into the Popular Democratic Front for the Liberation of Palestine was announced.
