= Ahlam Mosteghanemi =

Algerian writer

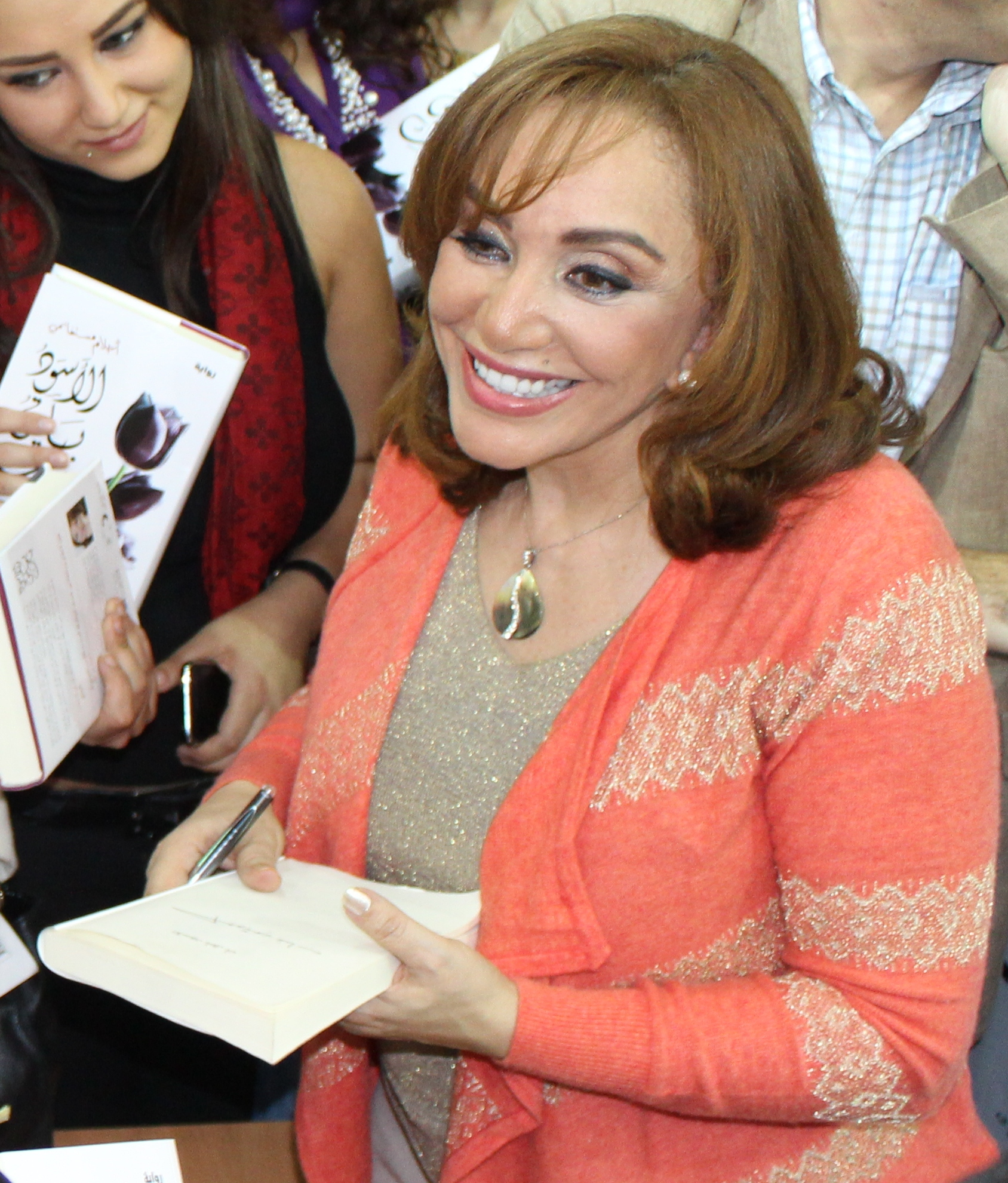
- Mosteghanemi at Beirut Book Fair 2012
- Born: April 13, 1953 (age 73); Tunis, French Tunisia
- Education: University of Algiers (BA) Sorbonne University (PhD)
- Occupation: Writer
- Writing career
- Language: Arabic
- Notable works: Memory in the Flesh (1993); Chaos of the Senses (1997); Bed Hopper (2003); The Art of Forgetting (2010)

Ahlam Mosteghanemi (Arabic: أحلام مستغانمي; born 13 April 1953, Tunisia) is an Algerian poet and writer. She was the first Algerian woman to publish poetry and fiction in Arabic. She has published four novels and six anthologies, and is best known for her 1993 novel Memory of the Flesh. In 2007 and 2008, she was ranked #96 and #58 respectively as the most influential Arab by the Arabian Business magazine.

== Biography ==
=== Early life and education ===
Mosteghanemi's family was originally from Constantine in eastern Algeria. Her father, an Algerian nationalist, was imprisoned following the 1945 Sétif riots in which two of his brothers were killed. He was released in 1947 and the family relocated to Tunis, Tunisia, where Mosteghanemi was born in 1953. Her father continued his activism and support of Algerian independence. After Algeria gained independence in 1962 he took prominent positions in the government of Ahmed Ben Bella. In 1965, the Boumediene coup d'état removed Ben Bella from power, and her father suffered a mental breakdown and was sent to a hospital in Algiers. His mental struggles and the continued political turmoil in Algeria left him resentful, confused, and disillusioned.

In the absence of her father, Mosteghanemi, as the eldest sibling, provided for her family by working as a radio host. At the age of seventeen, she became popular in Algeria with a poetic daily show, Hammassat (Whispers). In 1973, she became the first woman to publish a compilation of poetry in Arabic when she published Ala Marfa al Ayam (To the Day's Haven). This was followed in 1976 by Al Kitaba fi Lahdat Ouray (The Writing in a Moment of Nudity). Mosteghanemi belonged to the first generation in Algeria that was able to study and write in Arabic, after more than a century of prohibition by the French.

Mosteghanemi received her first degree in Literature from the University of Algiers. Following involvement in women's rights activism, she was then denied enrolment in a Master's programme at the same university, with the board of directors stating that her freedom of expression would have a negative effect on the other students. She was also expelled from the Union of Algerian Writers for not conforming to the established political line. Mosteghanemi consequently pursued her doctoral studies in France, earning a PhD in sociology from Sorbonne University with her thesis, later published as Algérie, femmes et écritures (Algeria, Women, and Writings) in 1985, about the representation of women in both Francophone and Arabic literature.

== Literary career ==
It was during Mosteghanemi's fifteen years she spent in Paris writing for various magazines and fragments of what would, after four years, become a novel that she transitioned from poetry to prose, stating that "When we lose a love, one writes a poem, when we lose our homeland, one writes a novel". She said Algeria was never far from her mind. "There are countries that we live in and countries that live in us".

In 1993, Mosteghanemi settled in Lebanon and her first novel, Zakirat el Jassad (Memory of the Flesh), was published. The editor of publishing house Dar Al Adab, described the novel as a poetic love story, told with political bravado, that echoed the disappointment of a generation of Arabs, and predicted that it would be a success throughout the Arab world. In a letter to the author, contemporary Arab poet Nizar Qabbani said, "This novel gave me vertigo." President Ben Bella said from exile, "Ahlam is an Algerian sun that illuminates the Arab world".

Memory of the Flesh earned Mosteghanemi the Naguib Mahfouz Prize in 1998, the Arabic equivalent of the Goncourt, and the Nour Prize for the best female work in the Arabic language. The jury for the "Ahlam is a light that shines in darkness. She was able to break out of the linguistic exile into which French colonialism had relegated Algerian intellectuals." By 2008, Memory of the Flesh had entered its 19th edition and had sold over 130,000 copies.

Mosteghanemi continued her literary career with two sequels: Fawda el Hawas (The Chaos of Senses) in 1997 and Aber Sareer” (Bed Hopper) in 2003.

In 2010, she published Nessyan.com (The Art of Forgetting), a break-up manual for women, which brought her closer to a female audience.

In 2012, her novel, El Aswad Yalikou Biki (Black Suits You So Well), was published. The story described the struggle of a young Algerian teacher whose father, a singer, had been killed by terrorists opposed to any form of art and joy in society. The novel addresses the challenges of standing up not only to terrorism, but also to the power of money and the media.

In 2001, Mosteghanemi established the Malek Haddad Literary Prize to encourage more Algerians to write in Arabic.

Since June 2008, she has been a goodwill ambassador for the United Nations.

== Personal life ==
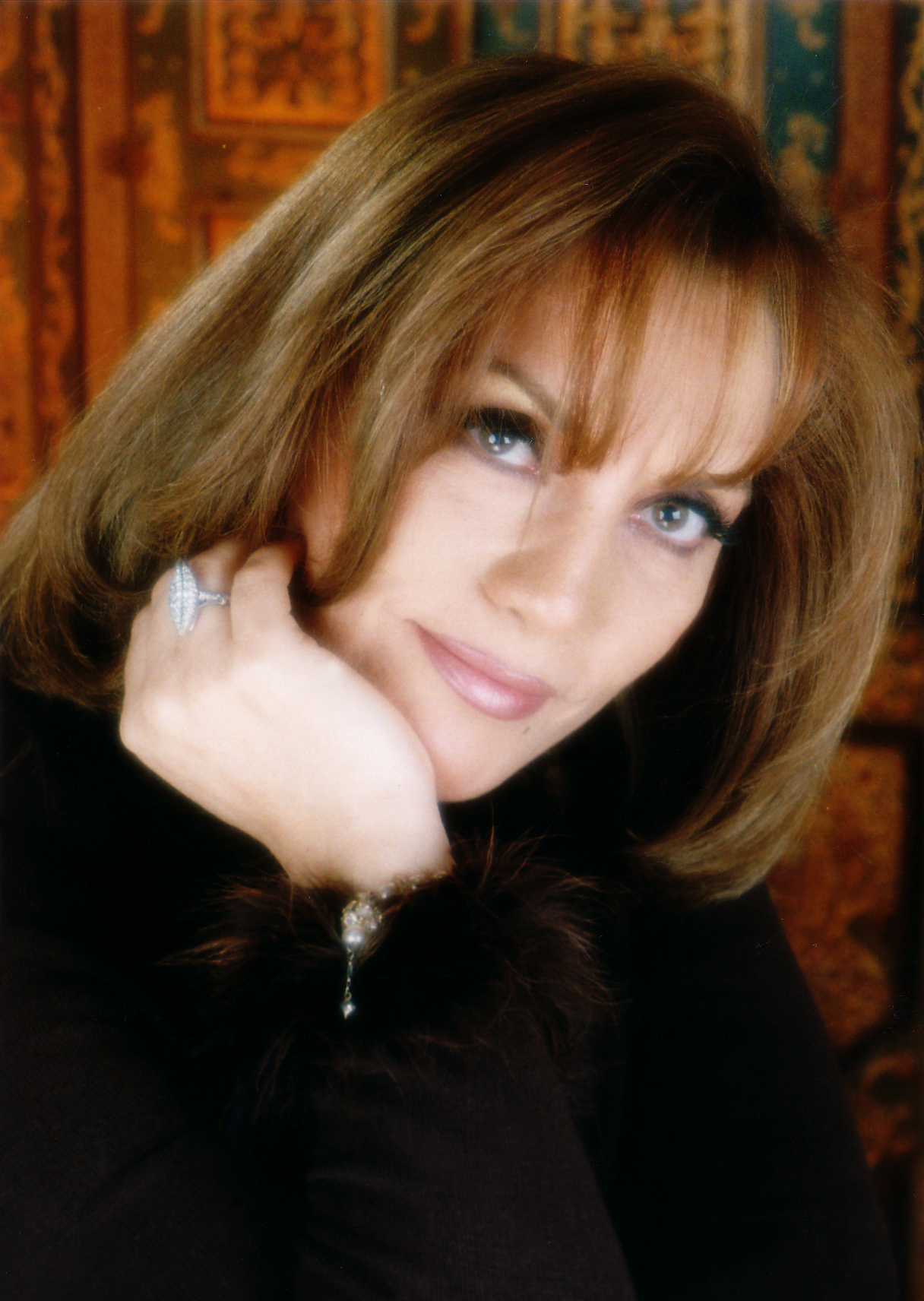

Mosteghanemi married Lebanese journalist Georges El Rassi in Paris in 1976. They have three sons together and live in Beirut, Lebanon.

== Works ==
=== Novels ===
1. Zakirat el Jassad (Memory in the Flesh/The Bridges of Constantine) - Published by Dar al adab, Beirut, 1993, 34 printed editions. Considered by critics as a turning point in Arabic literature.
2. Fawda el Hawas (Chaos of the Senses) - Published by Dar al adab in Beirut 1997, 30 printed editions.
3. Aber Sareer (Bed Hopper) - Published by Dar al adab in Beirut 2003, 22 printed editions.
4. El Aswad Yalikou Biki (Black Suits You so Well) - Published by Hachette-Antoine in Beirut 2012

=== Anthologies ===
1. Ala Marfa al Ayam (In the Harbour of Days) - Published by SNED in Algers 1973.
2. Al Kitaba fi Lahdat Ouray (Writing in a Moment of Nudity) - Published by Dar Al-Adab in Beirut 1976.
3. Algérie, femmes et écriture (Algeria, Women and Writings) - Published by l'Harmattan in Paris 1985.
4. Akadib Samaka (Lies of a Fish) - Published by l'ENAG in Algiers 1993.
5. Nessyane.com (The Art of Forgetting)- Published by Dar Al-Adab in Beirut 2009.
6. Shahiyyan ka firâq (Delicious as Parting Dreams)- Published by Hachette-Antoine/Naufal 2018.

== Awards and honors ==
- Named UNESCO Artist for Peace by director Irina Bokova in Paris, 2016.

== See also ==
- The Passenger Of a Bed
- Forgetting.com
- Black Suits You so Well
