= Ahmed Malek =

Egyptian actor

- أحمد مالك
- Malek at El Gouna Film Festival, 2025
- Born: September 29, 1995 (age 31); Cairo, Egypt
- Education: RADA
- Occupation: Actor

Ahmed Malek (Arabic: أحمد مالك; born September 29, 1995) is an Egyptian actor.

== Career ==
Malek starred in Mohamed Diab's Clash, which opened the Un Certain Regard at the 2016 Cannes Film Festival. Other roles include Sheikh Jackson (2017), Hepta: The Last Lecture and La Tottfea El Shams.

He had his first English-speaking role (also speaking Dari, Pashto and Badimaya, an Aboriginal Australian language) in the 2020 Australian film The Furnace. For his role he was nominated for the 2021 AACTA Award for Best Actor in a Leading Role.

Malek appeared in the 2022 film The Swimmers, dramatising the lives of Yusra and Sarah Mardini.

In 2023, Malek played the role of Musa in the BBC One miniseries Boiling Point.

== Selected filmography ==
=== Film ===
- 2008: Mafish Fayda (No Use) as Child
- 2012: Geddo Habibi (My Dear Grandpa) as Amir
- 2014: The Island 2 as Ali Mansour El-Hefny
- 2015: Regatta as Siko
- 2015: Ahwak (I Adore You) as Ahmed
- 2015: 4G (The Fourth Generation) as Rami
- 2016: Hepta: The Last Lecture as Karim
- 2016: Clash as Mans
- 2017: Sheikh Jackson as Khaled Hany
- 2018: Exterior/Night as Jimmy
- 2018: Gunshot as Alaa Abu Zeid
- 2018: El-Kwayeseen (The Good Ones) as Bolonaki
- 2019: The Treasure 2: Love and Destiny as Thutmose III
- 2019: The Guest as Osama
- 2020: New Year's Eve as Sherif
- 2020: The Furnace as Hanif
- 2022: Full Moon Night as Sherif
- 2022: Wahed Tany as Gasser
- 2022: Kira & El Gin as Ibrahim Shawkat
- 2022: The Swimmers as Nizar
- 2025: 6 Days as Youssef
- 2026: Cologne
- 2026: EgyBest

=== Television ===
- 2010: Al-Gama'a
- 2017: La Tottfea El Shams
- 2023: Boiling Point
- 2025: Welad El Shams
