= Randa El Behery =

Egyptian model and actress (born 1983)

Randa El Behery راندا البحيري
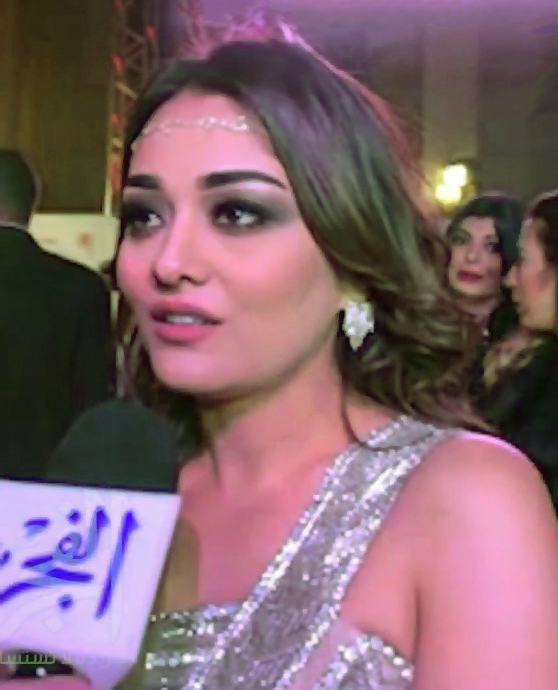
- El Behery in 2017
- Born: Randa Talaat El Behery راندا طلعت البحيري; August 8, 1983 (age 42); Cairo, Egypt]
- Education: Cairo University
- Occupation(s): Actress and model
- Notable work: Awqat Faragh

Randa El Behery (Arabic: راندا البحيري) is an Egyptian model and actress.

== Early life ==
Her mother was an interior designer. She studied at the Department of English Language and Literature at Cairo University.

== Career ==
Randa then worked in commercial advertising for three years before she started acting. El Behery participated in the series of "shames youm Geded(Sun of new day)" in 2000. She starred in advertisements and video clips.

She appeared in television serials such as Awlad Hetetna (Sons of our Neighborhood) and Ga2zat Npvel (Award for Novell), and El lolo2 El Mansor (Pearls Scattered), El Lyl we a5ro (Night and at the End)", and Afaryt el-Sayala (Ghosts of Sayala), Banat Afandyna (Girl Afan), and El Marsa we wl bahr (Mursi and the Sea), Ahlam Banat (dreams of girls), Kadyt Ray 3am (The Issue of Public Opinion), Lahazat Harega (critical moments) and Sanawat El Hob We El Malah (Years of Love and Salt). She appeared in sitcoms Esht el asfora (Bird's Nest) and Sherif We Nos (Sheriff and Half).

She starred in the films Ahasys (Feelings) and Aychen El Lahza (Living the Moment) and appeared Ayam Saaba (Difficult Days)" and Hassan and Marcus.
