= Tara Emad =

Egyptian actress and model

- تارا عماد
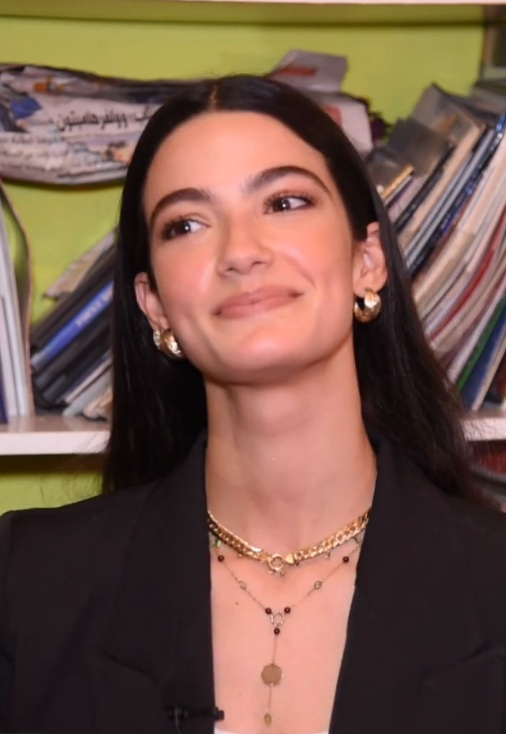
- Tara Emad in 2021
- Born: 11 May 1993 (age 33); Cairo, Egypt
- Occupations: Actress, Model
- Modeling information
- Height: 174 cm (5 ft 9 in)
- Hair color: Brown
- Eye color: Brown
- Website: www.instagram.com/taraemad/

Tara Emad (Egyptian Arabic: تارا عماد; born 11 May 1993) is an Egyptian actress and model.

== Career ==
Tara Emad is the daughter of an Egyptian father and a Montenegrin mother. Around the age of only 14, she had her first photo shoot with the MENA magazine Layalina, which also lead to her first runway show. Emad participated in Miss Teen Egypt and won the award in 2010. As a result, she entered the Miss Global Teen pageant in the same year in Brazil; Emad was the 1st runner-up and given the title of Teen Queen of Africa. Her modeling career soon expanded internationally, with appearances in major fashion publications including Elle, Vogue Arabia, and Harper’s Bazaar. Her elegance and versatility in showcasing different styles helped establish her as a prominent and in-demand model across the Middle East.

Tara Emad made her television debut in 2011 with the Egyptian series Al Jamaa’a. Since then, she has appeared in numerous successful productions and gained recognition from both audiences and critics. Her notable roles include Mawlana (2016), a drama film based on Ibrahim Eissa’s novel that explored important social and political issues. Emad was also part of the popular romantic comedy series El Anesa Farah (2019–2021), an adaptation of Jane the Virgin. In The Blue Elephant 2 (2019), the sequel to the acclaimed psychological thriller starring Karim Abdel Aziz, she took on a supporting role that contributed to the film’s compelling storyline. She was cast in Suits Arabia (2022), the Arabic adaptation of the American legal drama, in which she portrayed Layla, a confident and independent lawyer.

In 2025, Emad was cast in the television series Catalog, and in 2026 she played the role of Interpol operative in the film 7 Dogs.

== Filmography ==
Film
Year	Title	Role	Notes
2016	The Fourth Pyramid	Nada	
2016	The Eve's Apple		
2017	The Unknown Sweet Potato Seller		
2017	Voice Note		
2017	Kheir wa Baraka	Nazek Shawqi Safinah	
2018	Khouroug El Nass	Noor / Zhaki	
2018	122		
2018	Torab El Mass	Tuna	
2018	El Kewayeseen	Mazag Kewayyes	
2019	The Blue Elephant 2	Mermed	
2020	Pause		
2021	The Babylon Gardens		
2023	My Brother Above in the Tree	Nadine	
2023	The Outcasts	Farida	
2023	Beit El Ruby	Bahira	
2025	For the First Time	Ghada	
2025	Siko Siko	Dalya	
2025	Darwish	Kariman	
2025	El-Molhed		
2026	7 Dogs	Interpol Operative	Arabic language film
2026	El Gawahergy	Laila	
2027	The Mummy: Book of the Dead	TBA	Filming

Television
Year	Title	Role/Notes
2009	Al Jamaa	("The University")
2011	Queen of the Kitchen	
2012	Zay el Ward	
2014	Saheb al Sa’ada	Main role
2014	Circle of Love	Main role
2014	Leilit Ounce	Presenter (13 episodes)
2015	Bein El Sarayat	
2015	El Salook	(The Wretched)
2015	Haret El Yahood	(Jews' Alley)
2016	Sabaa Benat	
2017	Lamei Al Qott	Main role
2020	Aladdin	TV movie
2020	Why Do We Love Again? (W Nheb Tani Leb)	
2021	Moussa	1 episode
2021	Ded Al Kesr	
2021	Women's Maadi House	
2022	Investigation	12 episodes
2022	Ramez Movie Star	1 episode
2022	Suits	Main role (29 episodes)
2025	Catalog	Netflix series, 8 episodes – character: Howaida

== Philanthropy ==
Emad is involved with her own charity organization Help From Your Heart Foundation; she has been a part of the organization since 2013. The project distributes donations to families and children in orphanages in Cairo.

== Personal life ==
She studied at the German University in Cairo- Applied Arts & Science. She previously attended school at Port Said Language School in Zamalek, Cairo.
