= Al-Gama'a =

2010 Egyptian TV series

- Al-Gama'a الجماعة
- Genre: Drama; Historical; Political drama
- Created by: Wahid Hamid; Mohammed Yasin
- Starring: Eyad Nassar; Hassan El Raddad; Ezzat Alayli; Abdul Aziz Mckheon; Yosra El Lozy; Sawsan Badr; Salah Abdallah; Sami Meghawri
- Country of origin: Egypt
- Original language: Arabic
- No. of seasons: 1
- No. of episodes: 28

Production
- Running time: 39 - 43 minutes

Original release
- Release: 11 August 2010 – present

Al-Gama'a (Arabic: الجماعة al-Jamāʿah, IPA: [elɡæˈmæːʕæ], "the society/group") is an Egyptian television drama, Historical and Political drama series written by Wahid Hamid, directed by Mohammed Yasin and produced by Kamel Abu Ali. The series began filming in January 2010 with a budget of 50 million Egyptian pounds. The show deals with the rise of the Muslim Brotherhood, Egypt's largest Islamist political group, which was officially banned but nonetheless tolerated to an extent before the revolution. Critics have decried the show's pro-government stance, charging that it plays into the Egyptian government's agenda prior to the 2010 Egyptian parliamentary elections.

== Production ==
The series was filmed in the Media Production City and in Heliopolis in Cairo and several other Egyptian governorates.

== Series synopsis ==
=== Season 1 ===
The show begins with Muslim Brotherhood student demonstrations at Al-Azhar University and Cairo University campuses in protest of vote rigging in the 2006 student union elections. At Al-Azhar, demonstrators hold a military-like parade that causes controversy as many observers question the group's claim of renouncing violence. Upon their arrest, the Muslim Brotherhood student suspects are interviewed by a police officers. One of the police officers (Ashraf Helal) refuses to interview them because he knows nothing about them. Helal looks for books about the Muslim Brotherhood but finds that there are too many about the subject. Later, he meets an old female friend (Shirin) and tells her about his station. She suggest that he talks to her grandfather (Chancellor Abdallah Kassab), who gives Helal a list of books to read about the Muslim Brotherhood and its founder, Hasan al-Banna. The show then depicts Hasan al-Banna's life, from his childhood to the banning of the Muslim Brotherhood in 1948. During the season, the show jumps back and forth between Al-Banna's time and the present time.

== Reception ==
=== Criticism and controversy ===
Critics of the show, led by Al-Banna's son Saif Al-Islam, have accused the series' scriptwriter Wahid Hamed of defamation, making false claims and attempting to distort the image of his father and the group as extremists.

Saif Al-Islam Al-Banna called for the show to be banned and demanded a copy of the script to revise it and make sure it conforms to the facts of his father's life.

"I sent [those in charge of the TV series] a warning last week, calling on them to suspend the broadcast and give me a copy of the script to revise. But when they did not respond, I filed the lawsuit against them a few days later".

— Saif Al-Islam Hassan al-Banna, Hassan Al-Banna’s son

Saif Al-Islam filed a lawsuit against Wahid Hamed and the Egyptian television stations that broadcast the program. The Cairo Economic Court looked into the lawsuit filed against the scriptwriter of the TV series and its producer, the Egyptian Radio and Television Union (ERTU).

"The damage of distorting his (Al-Banna’s) history hurts all Islamic movements, as well as his family".

— Saif Al-Islam Hassan al-Banna, Hassan Al-Banna’s son

The Muslim Brotherhood argues that the series depicts them as a violent, fundamentalist group, whose leaders are deceptive businessmen merely hungry for authority. The Muslim Brotherhood quickly decided to retaliate by producing its own series portraying the movement's history. "Hassan Al-Banna: The Journey Did Not End" is a 32-episode series to be filmed immediately after Ramadan.

The government of Hosni Mubarak has been accused of influencing the series to present the Brotherhood in a thoroughly negative light (and conversely to present the Egyptian regime, particularly the State Security apparatus, in a thoroughly positive light) ahead of the Egyptian parliamentary elections of 28 November 2010, in which the Brotherhood formed the largest opposition bloc to the ruling National Democratic Party.

==== A Mistake in Quoting a Verse from Qur'an ====
In one scene during sixth episode of the series, in which Sheikh Mohammed Zahran and young Hassan al-Banna are arguing, Sheikh Mohammed Zahran recites a verse from the Qur'an, accidentally changing a word and thus causing controversy. The verse (number 199 from Sura Al-A'raf) is "Hold to forgiveness; command what is right; But turn away from the ignorant".

== See also ==
- List of Egyptian television series
