= Beastly (film) =

- Theatrical release poster
- Directed by: Daniel Barnz
- Screenplay by: Daniel Barnz
- Based on: Beastly by Alex Flinn
- Produced by: Susan Cartsonis
- Starring: Vanessa Hudgens; Alex Pettyfer; Mary-Kate Olsen; Peter Krause; LisaGay Hamilton; Neil Patrick Harris
- Cinematography: Mandy Walker
- Edited by: Thomas J. Nordberg
- Music by: Marcelo Zarvos
- Distributed by: CBS Films
- Release date: March 4, 2011
- Running time: 86 minutes
- Country: United States
- Language: English
- Budget: $17 million
- Box office: $43.2 million

Beastly is a 2011 American romantic fantasy drama film loosely based on Alex Flinn's 2007 novel of the same name. It is a retelling of the fairytale Beauty and the Beast and is set in modern-day New York City. The film was written and directed by Daniel Barnz, and stars Vanessa Hudgens, Alex Pettyfer, Mary-Kate Olsen (in her final film role), Peter Krause, LisaGay Hamilton and Neil Patrick Harris.

== Plot ==
Kyle Kingson is the arrogant and vain son of news anchor Rob Kingson. After he bullies Kendra Hilferty, not knowing she is a witch, for defacing his pictures, she transforms him into a bald, scarred, heavily tattooed shell of his former self. She warns Kyle that he will remain altered for the rest of his life, unless he finds someone who loves him by the next spring. Kyle is taken to live in a private house with their maid Zola Davies and his blind tutor Will. Both are comforts to Kyle when his father, unable to deal with his transformation, has abandoned him.

As spring nears, Kyle finds himself infatuated with Lindy Taylor, a former classmate he had avoided. He rescues her drug-addicted father from two dealers, fatally shooting one; the other vows to kill Lindy. Kyle persuades Lindy's father to allow her to move in with him. At first, Kyle uses a false identity and introduces himself as Hunter. He also refuses to see Lindy and hides from her, which angers her to the point that she stops speaking to him. Kyle eventually reveals his face and the two begin to warm up to each other. Kyle writes a letter professing his love for Lindy but does not give it to her for fear of rejection. He visits Kendra to plead for more time; she states the spell cannot be undone, but agrees to restore Will's vision and grant green cards to Zola's three children in Jamaica if he gets Lindy to fall in love with him. Seeing his apparent change of heart, she bids him good luck.

The surviving drug dealer lands in jail. Kyle and Lindy visit Lindy's hospitalized father, who overdosed. Kyle gives her the letter but regrets it when she tells him she considers him a good friend. Lindy calls him after reading the letter, but a heartbroken Kyle does not answer the phone. Persuaded by Will and Zola, Kyle goes to meet Lindy one last time before she leaves on a school trip to Machu Picchu. Kyle tells her to go, but as she leaves, Lindy tells him that she loves him, breaking the curse. Kyle's former self is restored but Lindy does not recognize him and tries to call Hunter but Kyle's phone rings instead. When Lindy realizes what happened, the two share a passionate kiss on the side of the street.

After the curse is lifted, Will wakes up with the ability to see and Zola receives the green cards. An intern (implied to be Kendra) approaches Rob Kingson's office.

An alternate ending was filmed, in which Lindy gets kidnapped by the drug dealer and Kyle is shot while saving her. As he lies injured in her arms, she confesses her love to him, breaking the curse in a fashion more closely based on the book and the original Beauty and the Beast story. This ending was not used in the official release.

== Cast ==
- Vanessa Hudgens as Lindy Taylor
- Alex Pettyfer as Kyle Kingson
- Mary-Kate Olsen as Kendra Hilferty
- Neil Patrick Harris as Will Fratalli
- LisaGay Hamilton as Zola Davies
- Peter Krause as Rob Kingson
- Dakota Johnson as Sloan Hagen
- Erik Knudsen as Trey Madison
- Rhiannon Moller-Trotter as Halloween Partygoer
- David Francis as Dr. Davis
- Brian Eastman as Dan Granburg
- Gio Perez as Victor Barrel
- Roc Lafortune as Lindy's father

== Production ==
=== Development ===
I was very inspired by 'Say Anything....' I thought there was this kind of rawness and visceral qualities of those years. Being 18 and 19 and what those years are like. So, I wanted to translate that into this film as well.

- Daniel Barnz, Beastly director on writing the screenplay

The film is based on Alex Flinn's 2007 supernatural romance novel Beastly, to which CBS Films bought the rights in December 2007. In February 2009, it was announced by Amy Baer, President and CEO of CBS Films, that Daniel Barnz would direct the film and write the screenplay. Susan Cartsonis produced the film through Storefront Films and Roz Weisberg co-produced it. Initially, the executives wanted a late 2008 theatrical release; however, the WGA strike prevented that possibility.

Baer expressed excitement about the director, saying, "Daniel's fresh vision makes him one of the most exciting directors of his generation. We are thrilled to partner with him as he brings his unique voice to arguably the most universally resonant myth in storytelling." Barnz anticipated bringing an indie sensibility to Flinn's story. "It's a very commercial idea that I get to tell in a highly artistic fashion," he said. Barnz also said; "There was this sort of hyper-modern version of this story and that it was told from his perspective, which we'd never seen before and thematically, because it's all about beauty and how you look and inner beauty that this was such a great story set in the teenage world and for teenagers, because it has such a great message to it".

Barnz's script was inspired by the film Say Anything.... He "immediately fell for it, because [he] saw that there was an amazing opportunity to tell a modern version of this fairytale and [he] loved the idea of it." Barnz was happy that the story would be told from the beast's perspective and that it focused more on the romance elements than the supernatural.

=== Design ===
Alex Pettyfer in prosthetics as the beast. The makeup includes 67 pieces; seven on his head and 60 tattoos and individual scars in his whole body. It took seven hours to apply the full-body makeup.

In his role as Hunter, Pettyfer's appearance was altered with heavy makeup and prosthetics. Hunter's appearance differs from the description in the novel; he has no fur or fangs. Pettyfer was pleased with the revision; he said, "I was very happy to know I wasn't going to be furry. Question is, were you happy I wasn't furry? Well, I think the audience will be happy. This beast make-up is phenomenal. You're talking to someone who is a fanatic about it [prosthetics and movie make-up] and I've never seen anything that looks remotely similar to this."

The makeup consisted of 67 pieces; seven pieces went on his head and 60 tattoos and individual scars were applied after the full-body makeup. The facial prosthetics and tattoos took almost three hours to apply and the full body makeup took the artists six hours to finish. About his transformation, Pettyfer said, "It really affected me because as soon as I shaved my head it kind of put me in this weird place, the same place [Kyle is in after his transformation] which really helped me with the role a lot. But at the same time, it kind of is a challenge because you are fighting personally with your own problems off set, but then onset you have a great resource to go to."

Tony Gardner and Alterian, Inc. designed and created the prosthetics and tattoos. Jamie Kelman handled Pettyfer's daily makeup application. Hudgens described the beast's look as "crazy" and that it moved her in "a really weird and peculiar way." Several days before the announced production date, several members of the cast were photographed en route to a wardrobe studio for fittings. The costumes and clothing used in the film were designed by Suttirat Anne Larlarb.

=== Filming ===
Beastly was one of the first feature films to be produced and distributed by CBS Films; it had a budget of $17 million for filming and marketing. Production began on June 13, 2009, in Montreal, Quebec, Canada and ended in August that year. The first clip of the official Beastly trailer was filmed in Chicago, and used Walter Payton College Prep High School as Buckston Academy High School. Old Montreal and Laval were used as filming locations, and Mount Royal Park in Montreal served as Central Park in New York and other outdoor locations. Local Montreal diner Place Milton was also used as a location, and was renamed Cafe Santiago for the film. Filming was completed in 45 days.

The Quebec government announced on June 12, 2009, that it would increase its tax credit for foreign TV and film producers filming there from 25% of labor expenses to 25% of the entire budget of productions shot there. The producers of Beastly chose to film in Montreal before the announcement of tax-paying increase.

Hudgens left for Montreal to film following the MTV Movie Awards. "I'm laid-back about it," she said. On June 4, 2009, Hudgens and Pettyfer arrived in Montreal. Neil Patrick Harris also went to Montreal to shoot his scenes, and concurrently for his lead role in an independent film. Hudgens was the first to finish shooting in order to promote the film Bandslam. Re-shoots were conducted in 2010 due to the delays to the film's release and in order to "emphasize the romantic relationship between the two main characters".

=== Music and soundtrack ===
The film score was composed by Marcelo Zarvos. Songs by Swedish indie band Marching Band were featured in the film. Also featured was Natalia Kills' second single, "Wonderland". The film's soundtrack was released on March 1, 2011, and the score album was released on March 15, 2011; both albums were released by Lakeshore Records.

Beastly (Songs from the Motion Picture)

Soundtrack album by Various
- Released: March 1, 2011
- Label: Lakeshore

Original Motion Picture Soundtrack:

1. On the Radio - Regina Spektor (3:21)
2. Vanity - Hanover Swain (2:57) (Movie Version performed by Lady Gaga)
3. Garden of Exile - Toby Martin (4:12)
4. Get Free - The Vines (2:04)
5. Boys and Girls - Pixie Lott (3:07)
6. Crashing - Gersey (5:09)
7. Transatlanticism - Death Cab for Cutie (7:51)
8. Today Is the Day - Tim Myers (4:29)
9. The Long Goodbye - Army Navy (4:35)
10. Breathe In, Breathe Out - Mat Kearney (3:42)
11. Heaven - Fire Theft (4:12)
12. Broken Arrow - Pixie Lott (3:42)
13. Be Mine - Kristina & The Dolls (3:00)
14. Supa Luv A-Rex Remix - Teen Top (Used for the movie's promotion throughout Asia)

Beastly (Original Motion Picture Score)

Film score by Marcelo Zarvos
- Released: March 15, 2011
- Label: Lakeshore

Original Motion Picture Score Soundtrack:

1. The Thinking Thing Killed (1:06)
2. Lake House (2:51)
3. Jujyfruits (1:06)
4. The Poem (2:54)
5. High School (:53)
6. It's Always Been Me (5:23)
7. Elephant Story (1:40)
8. Building The Greenhouse (:53)
9. Drive To The Station (1:48)
10. The Curse Part 1 (1:53)
11. Lindy's Picture (2:21)
12. The Kiss (3:39)
13. Hunter Rescues Lindy (4:00)
14. Food And Gifts (1:57)
15. Lindy's In Trouble (4:22)
16. The Curse Part 2 (2:24)
17. Hunter And Zola Talk (1:29)
18. Finale (3:26)

== Marketing ==
The first teaser trailer was released on November 20, 2009, during the previews of The Twilight Saga: New Moon. The 23-second teaser received comments from commercial websites. Annie Barrett of Entertainment Weekly wrote, "Alex Pettyfer is giving off more of a (Disney pretty-boy) Gaston vibe than the Beast here." A holographic poster was displayed in selected theaters. The first official poster was then released in early April 2010. A featurette video which includes clips from the film, was released in early February 2010. The full-length trailer premiered on April 19, 2010. A new trailer, featuring a new logo, the new release date and the song "Broken Arrow" by Pixie Lott, was released in late 2010.

== Merchandising ==
CBS Films announced that clothing and accessories, social expressions and games would be produced to market the film. Among the products were proprietary and co-branded games and puzzles by Fundex; figures and bobbleheads worldwide by Bif Bang Pow!; costumes, masks and accessories for the US and Canada from Rubie's; and video games worldwide from Storm City.

== Release ==
Beastly was expected to be distributed to theaters by CBS Films on July 30, 2010. However, the film's release was delayed until March 18, 2011, in order to avoid a clash with the release of Charlie St. Cloud, which starred Zac Efron, Hudgens's then-boyfriend with whom she had a strong following at the time. In January 2011, the release was moved forward to March 4, 2011. Alliance Films, based in Montreal, released the film in Canada under a deal with CBS Films. Sony Pictures handled international distribution. The first planned release date was July 30, 2010, but a few weeks after Charlie St. Cloud moved to a July 30 release, CBS films released a statement through Beastly's official Facebook page. CBS films would delay the release of Beastly because it would cause a "real dilemma" to fans of Zac Efron and Vanessa Hudgens' relationship. The film's new release date was March 18, 2011, to avoid clashing with films opening during summer 2010. However, the new date was four weeks after Pettyfer debuted in American cinema in I Am Number Four, and three weeks before the release of Hudgens' other film Sucker Punch. CBS Films distribution head Steven Friedlander said, "There wasn't much left in the summer that we could move it to. We didn't want to go in fall, and the holidays are for four-quadrant movies. So we figured if we went to March, we'd have some school breaks happening around that time." After a successful test screening, CBS Films decided on an earlier release date, March 4, 2011. The movie was released on Blu-ray Disc on June 28, 2011.

=== Critical reception ===
Beastly received mixed-to-negative reviews, earning a 20% approval rating from Rotten Tomatoes from 96 reviews, with an average rating of 3.70/10. The critical consensus read "Fundamentally misguided, poorly written, and badly acted, Beastly adds little to the legacy of its timeless source material." On Metacritic, the film has a weighted average score of 40 out of 100 based on reviews from 26 critics, indicating "mixed or average" reviews. Audiences surveyed by CinemaScore gave the film a grade "B+" on scale of A to F. Adam Markovitz gave it a D− in Entertainment Weekly, commenting, "Spectacularly poor judgment in everything from acting to costuming (Olsen's Harajuku-troll get-up is scarier than her curse) puts Beastly right on the cusp of the so-bad-it's-good Hall of Shame." Mick LaSalle of the San Francisco Chronicle, while noting problems with the plot and script, argued that these problems were largely acceptable within the confines of the genre, and were alleviated by the charm of the actors and the direction. He remarked that Barnz "showed imagination and sensitivity in his feature Phoebe in Wonderland and hasn't lost those qualities now that he's entered the world of the big budgets." Claudia Puig wrote in USA Today that "This modern reworking of Beauty and the Beast has none of the charm of the Disney animated version. It's dogged by awkward dialogue, a ridiculous plot and lackluster performances, especially by the leads ..." A number of reviewers criticized that Kyle did not look genuinely ugly in his beast form, and could even be regarded as more attractive, thereby compromising the film's moral about "inner beauty" shining through physical ugliness.

=== Box office ===
Beastly had the third largest weekend gross earnings during its opening weekend behind Rango and The Adjustment Bureau. As of May 25, Beastly's total US gross is $27.9 million. It garnered $15.3 million more in other regions, making the film's worldwide gross earnings $43.2 million.

=== Accolades ===
2011 Teen Choice Awards

- Choice Movie Lip Lock - Alex Pettyfer and Vanessa Hudgens (nominated)
- Choice Movie Breakout Actor - Alex Pettyfer (won)

Hudgens and Pettyfer were honored as ShoWest Stars of Tomorrow for their roles in Beastly.
