= Christine Solomon =

Canadian actress (born 1981)

- Born: February 13, 1981 (age 45); Cairo, Egypt
- Occupation: Actress
- Years active: 1986–present
- Website: christinesolomon.com

Christine Solomon is an Egyptian-born American and Canadian actress, author and entrepreneur. Her career spans film, television, theatre and voice acting, with work in Egypt, Canada and the United States. Her credits include the films Basra (2008), Heliopolis (2009) and Betroit (2012), as well as the television series The Detectives and Netflix's The Body (2026), in which she was cast in the recurring role of Salma.

== Early life and education ==
Solomon was born in Cairo; her family moved to Montreal, Quebec, when she was 7 years old. She developed an interest in acting during her childhood.

Other members of Solomon's family have also established careers in the film and television industries. They include renowned Egyptian film director Sandra Nashaat, recognized for her contributions to Egyptian cinema; award-winning Egyptian cinematographer Victor Credi; and Lebanese actress and television presenter Sacha Dahdouh, a recipient of the Murex d'Or award for Best Lebanese Supporting Actress.

Solomon graduated from Dawson College's three-year Professional Theatre program in Montreal, regarded as one of the city's leading theatre training programs, second only to the National Theatre School of Canada. There, she received formal training in classical and contemporary theatre. Her studies encompassed Greek tragedy, Shakespeare, commedia dell'arte and modern dramatic literature, alongside acting techniques developed by Konstantin Stanislavski and Sanford Meisner.

Her path to the Professional Theatre program began while studying Arts and Literature at Dawson College, with plans to pursue communications at Concordia University. During this period, she enrolled in an elective drama course offered outside the college's Professional Theatre program. The course was taught by Victor Knight, an actor and theatre educator who co-founded Dawson's Professional Theatre program and served as national president of ACTRA. Impressed by her acting performances, Knight strongly encouraged Solomon to audition for the program, prompting her to change her academic plans and pursue professional acting training.

Among her professors was W. Steven Lecky, a former chair of Dawson College's Theatre Department and creator of the Vox Method. Solomon studied the method extensively throughout all three years of her training, with an emphasis on vocal technique, speech, dramatic text analysis, impulse and character development.

Following her graduation, Solomon continued her professional training in Canada and the United States, including studies at Ivana Chubbuck Studios, John Strasberg Studios and The Groundlings.

== Acting career ==
Solomon made her stage debut when she was 5 years old, which was followed by theatrical performances, TV commercials, and other roles.

She has acted in over 20 stage plays, performed voice-over roles (including for DL Music) for TV networks and shows including Dr. 90210, the Academy Awards, Fox, Melrose Place, Disney, and videogame publisher Ubisoft. She also performed in films and television shows such as The Score with Academy Award-winning actors Robert De Niro and Marlon Brando, VH1's Hysteria - The Def Leppard Story, Sony Pictures' Head in the Clouds, and HBO Canada's Fakers.

Solomon has worked on films and music videos broadcast and distributed through Rotana Group, a Saudi media and entertainment company founded by Prince Alwaleed bin Talal, with operations spanning television broadcasting, film production and music distribution. She is also co-lead in Gabriel's Gift, directed by academy award nominee Roland Joffe.

== Breakthrough in Egyptian cinema ==
Solomon's breakthrough in Egyptian cinema followed an invitation from prominent Egyptian screenwriter and producer Medhat El Adl to attend the 2006 Cairo International Film Festival. El Adl belongs to one of Egypt's prominent entertainment dynasties, whose members have established careers in acting, screenwriting, directing and film production. His brother, actor and producer Sami El Adl, was regarded as the patriarch of the El Adl entertainment dynasty. Sami founded El Adl Film, while Medhat and their brothers Gamal and Mohamed established El Adl Group in 1997, which became a major production company in Egyptian cinema and television. She subsequently relocated to Cairo and secured roles in Egyptian productions, including voice-over work in Balad Al-Banat and on-screen appearances in Ahmed Rashwan's Basra (2008) and Ahmad Abdalla's Heliopolis (2009).

Both films gained recognition on the international film festival circuit. Basra received several awards, including Best Screenplay in the Arab competition at the 2008 Cairo International Film Festival and Best Film at the 2009 Arab Film Festival in Brussels. The film was also selected for the 2008 São Paulo International Film Festival in Brazil. Heliopolis was selected to screen at the 2009 Toronto International Film Festival and was also selected for the Vancouver International Film Festival, Marrakech International Film Festival, Thessaloniki International Film Festival and the 2010 Palm Springs International Film Festival. The film also received a Special Mention at the 2009 Cairo International Film Festival.

== Awards and recognition ==
Solomon won the Best Actress of Empowerment Award at the 2009 Madbakh Awards in Toronto for her role in Heliopolis, which also received international festival recognition, including a Special Mention at the 2009 Cairo International Film Festival. Solomon was the first actress to portray a Gothic character in Egyptian cinema. In 2016, she received an Award of Merit for Best Lead Actress at the WRPN Short, Tight & Loose Film Festival Competition for her performance in Yumna.

Beyond the international festival recognition of Heliopolis and Basra, several other films featuring Solomon have received awards and commercial recognition. Betroit (2012) reached No. 1 at the Lebanese box office for six consecutive weeks and received a Best Film award at the Beirut International Film Festival. My Stretch of Texas Ground accumulated 25 award wins and three nominations, including a Gold Award for Narrative Feature at the International Independent Film Awards, while Jacir, starring Academy Award-nominated actress Lorraine Bracco, won Best Tennessee Feature at the 2022 Nashville Film Festival.

== Entrepreneurship, publishing and education ==
Alongside her acting career, Solomon has established businesses in entertainment production, publishing and acting education.

She founded Christine Solomon Productions in 2009, developing and producing comedy shows, sketches and stage productions. Her production work also includes Catching Up with Christine Solomon (2009–2013), a Montreal-based series she produced and hosted, featuring interviews with business executives and industry leaders about their professional experiences, as well as coverage of local cultural events.

In 2010, Solomon established Muze Consultancy, providing career guidance, audition preparation and professional development services for actors. She is a member of the Association of Acting Coaches and Educators (AACE) and is listed among acting coaches and career development professionals by ACTRA Montreal. She has also delivered guest lectures at Concordia University, including its Global Business class, and Dawson College's Professional Theatre program.

Through Hill Weiser Publishing, Solomon released two children's books: Odd Ed (2021), illustrated by Anastasia Balobanova, and Wishing Upon a New Moon (2023), illustrated by Nataliia Mazepa. The former addresses individuality, kindness and self-acceptance, while the latter explores friendship, perfectionism and learning from mistakes.

Solomon's children's books, Odd Ed and Wishing Upon a New Moon, have been sold through major book retailers, including Barnes & Noble, Indigo and Chapters, as well as independent bookstores such as Book Soup and Skylight Books and online retailer Amazon. Barnes & Noble's West Coast flagship store at The Grove in Los Angeles also hosted author events for both titles, where Solomon presented readings and book signings. Her Canadian bookstore appearances included events at Chapters Vega in Mississauga, Ontario, and Indigo in Pointe-Claire, Quebec.

In January 2022, Odd Ed was featured on Global TV as part of its community-events coverage. In April 2023, Lady Gaga's Born This Way Foundation featured Solomon's children's book Odd Ed on its Channel Kindness platform, inviting her to write an article exploring the book's inspiration and its themes of individuality, kindness and self-acceptance.

In January 2025, Solomon founded Cast Forward, a publication covering acting techniques, auditions and professional development within the entertainment industry. It publishes educational articles and interviews with entertainment professionals. In April 2025, established film critic Sherif M. Awad reported that Cast Forward had reached No. 19 on Substack's Rising in Business chart.

== Advocacy and professional services ==
Solomon has been involved in charitable campaigns and public-awareness initiatives concerning veterans' welfare, health and social issues. She served as a lead host for GMC's #enlistme campaign supporting Building for America's Bravest, a program of the Stephen Siller Tunnel to Towers Foundation dedicated to providing specially adapted homes for severely injured U.S. military veterans. Her contributions included narrating public-service documentary material and conducting live interviews. The campaign also featured actor Josh Duhamel as its ambassador. In a 2017 interview, Solomon reported that the initiative had raised up to $17 million and reached approximately 110 million viewers.

Her advocacy activities have included rosacea awareness campaigns associated with the Acne and Rosacea Society of Canada and Galderma Canada. In 2021, she participated in Galderma's #RosaceaChallenge, an initiative addressing public awareness of rosacea.

In the entertainment industry, Solomon served on the Television Nominating Committee for the 25th Annual SAG Awards and has participated as a juror at film festivals in Canada and the United States.

== Filmography ==
=== Film ===
Year	Title	Role	Notes
2001	The Score	Graduate	
2001	Obsession	Lisa	
2004	Head in the Clouds	Parisian Woman #2	
2007	City of Girls	Gigi	
2008	Basra	Boutina	
2009	Heliopolis	Gothic Girl	
2013	True Piracy	Officer Nathaniel	
2011	Rats of Babylon	Habiba	
2012	Betroit	Rola	
2015	What Now	Melissa	
2015	Yumna	Yumna	
2016	Just 20	Monica	
2017	The Big Shot	Chantal	
2018	Kids Can	Christine	
	Gabriel's Gift	Natalie	In-Development
	A Sixth Dimension	Alter	In-Development
2019	My Stretch of Ground	Zaina	
2020	Bullet Ride	Chantal	

=== Television ===
Year	Title	Role	Notes
2001	Hysteria - The Def Leppard Story	Groupie	TV movie
2007	Mat Ghani Alaya	Lana	TV series
2007	La Tagini Tatazerer	Yasmine	TV series
2007	Aleel El Heilah	Dina	TV series
2007	Eyes and Ashes	Mariam	TV series
2009	Catching up with Christine Solomon	Christine Solomon	TV series
2010	Fakers	Exotic Dancer	TV movie
2015	Yasmine	Reem	TV series

=== Video games ===
Year	Title	Role	Notes
2015	Rainbow Six: Siege	Mira, Pregnant Woman, Radio Announcer	Voice
