= Peter Krause =

American actor (born 1965)

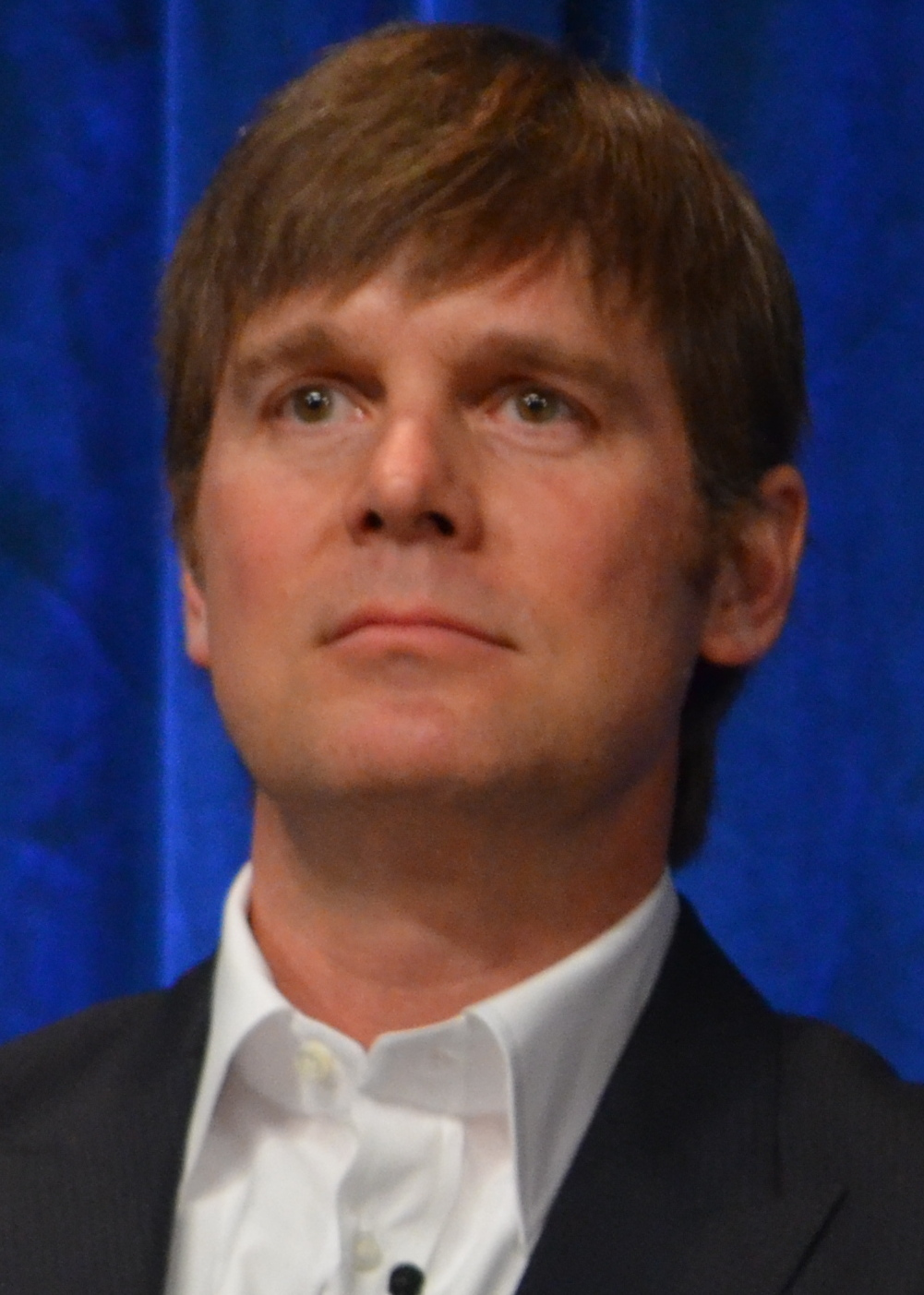
- Krause at the 2013 Paleyfest
- Born: Peter William Krause; August 12, 1965 (age 61); Alexandria, Minnesota, U.S.
- Education: Gustavus Adolphus College (BA); New York University (MFA)
- Occupations: Actor; director; producer
- Years active: 1983–present
- Partner: Lauren Graham (2010–2021)
- Children: 1

Peter William Krause (/ˈkraʊzə/; born August 12, 1965) is an American actor, director, and producer. He has held leading roles across multiple acclaimed television series, portraying Casey McCall on Sports Night (1998–2000), Nate Fisher on Six Feet Under (2001–2005), Nick George on Dirty Sexy Money (2007–2009), Adam Braverman on Parenthood (2010–2015), Benjamin Jones on The Catch (2016–2017), Bobby Nash on Fox/ABC's 9-1-1 (2018–2025), and Mike Hollingsworth on Line of Fire (2026–present).

For his work on Six Feet Under, Krause was nominated for three Primetime Emmy Awards, two Golden Globe Awards, and seven Screen Actors Guild Awards, winning twice for Outstanding Performance by an Ensemble in a Drama Series.

== Early life ==
Krause was born on August 12, 1965, in Alexandria, Minnesota. His parents, Wanda Marie Krause (née Johnson) and William Popham "Bill" Krause, were both teachers in Minnesota. He was raised in Roseville, a suburb of St. Paul, and has two siblings, Amy and Michael.

As a teenager, Krause was active in track and field and gymnastics and attended Alexander Ramsey High School in Roseville. He graduated from high school in 1983 and was a pre-medical student at Gustavus Adolphus College in St. Peter until he discovered acting in his junior year and changed his final major to English Literature. In college, he performed in plays such as Paul Sills' Story Theatre, Caryl Churchill's Cloud 9, and Harold Pinter's The Dumb Waiter, which all led to his full commitment to acting. After graduating from college in 1987, Krause moved to New York City and completed a Master of Fine Arts degree in acting from New York University's Graduate Acting Program at the Tisch School of the Arts in 1990. While in New York City, he worked as a bartender at Broadway's Palace Theatre with Aaron Sorkin, who later created and executive produced Sports Night, which starred Krause.

While attending Tisch School of the Arts, he starred in productions of Macbeth, Uncle Vanya, and Arms and the Man. Shortly after graduation, Krause moved to Los Angeles after landing a regular role on Carol Burnett's sketch comedy series Carol & Company.

== Career ==
In 1987, Krause made his first feature film appearance in an American slasher film, Blood Harvest. After earning an M.F.A. degree from the New York University Tisch School of the Arts in 1990, he moved to Los Angeles and made his first television appearance, playing various roles in Carol Burnett's comedy anthology series Carol & Company from 1990 to 1991. In the early 1990s, he appeared in TV shows such as Seinfeld, Beverly Hills, 90210 and Ellen. Starting in 1996, Krause appeared in a recurring role as Cybill Shepherd's son-in-law Kevin on her sitcom Cybill for four seasons.

From 1998 to 2000, Krause also portrayed the character Casey McCall on the ABC network's comedy Sports Night. Although the show received considerable critical acclaim, it struggled to find an audience and was canceled after two seasons.

Krause starred in the critically acclaimed HBO drama series Six Feet Under from 2001 to 2005. He received seven award nominations (including three Emmy nominations) for his portrayal of funeral director Nate Fisher.

Krause appeared on Broadway in the summer of 2004 in a revival of Arthur Miller's After the Fall alongside Carla Gugino.

In December 2006, he played the lead role, Detective Joe Miller, in the Sci Fi Channel miniseries The Lost Room.

From 2007 to 2009, Krause portrayed young lawyer Nick George in ABC's drama Dirty Sexy Money alongside veteran actor Donald Sutherland. He had initially turned down the role three times. He also served as a series producer. From 2010 to 2015, he played Adam Braverman in the NBC comedy-drama Parenthood. He directed three episodes for the show. Krause appeared in the 2011 fantasy film Beastly, based on Alex Flinn's 2007 novel of the same name. From 2016 to 2017, he starred opposite Mireille Enos in the ABC crime drama series The Catch, produced by Shonda Rhimes. In August 2017, Krause was cast in the Ryan Murphy-produced drama 9-1-1, which focuses on the lives of first responders. He played one of the show's central characters, a fire captain named Bobby Nash, and served as the executive producer of the series. In 2025, his character was written out in Season 8 as part of the show's creative direction.

He is the narrator of Citizen Hearst, an Insignia Films documentary about William Randolph Hearst which originally aired as an American Experience two-part series on September 27 and 28, 2021.

In February 2026, Krause was cast as Mike Thornhill (now Hollingsworth) in the Joshua Safran-produced drama pilot Protection; in May 2026, the project was picked up by NBC and renamed as Line of Fire.

== Personal life ==
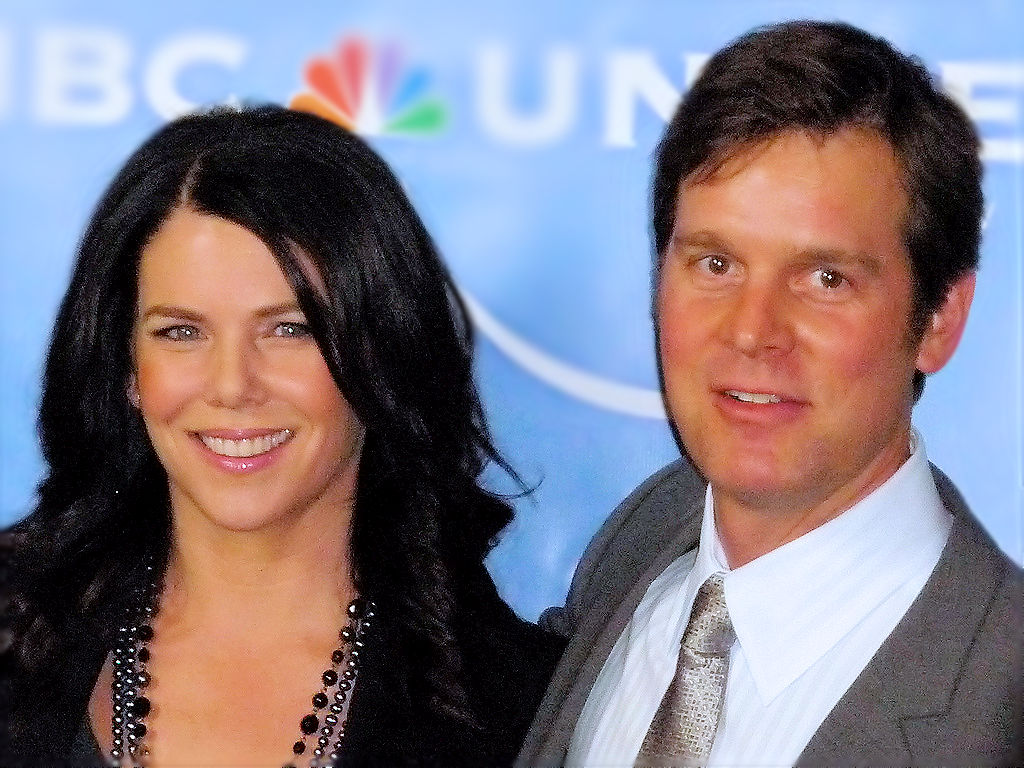
Graham and Krause in January 2011

Krause and his former girlfriend Christine King have a son, who was born in 2001. In 2010, Krause began a relationship with actress Lauren Graham. They first met in 1995 when appearing in the sitcom Caroline in the City, then became a couple while co-starring on Parenthood. In June 2022, it was reported that the couple had ended their relationship in 2021 after 11 years together.

== Filmography ==
=== Film ===
Year	Film	Role	Notes
1987	Blood Harvest	Scott	
1996	Lovelife	Tim	
1998	Melting Pot	Pedro Marine	
1998	The Truman Show	Lawrence	
1998	My Engagement Party	David Salsburg	
2000	It's a Shame About Ray	Mr. Hanks	Short
2004	We Don't Live Here Anymore	Hank Evans	
2006	Civic Duty	Terry Allen	
2011	Beastly	Rob Kingson	
2016	Night Owls	William Campbell	
2018	Saint Judy	Matthew	
2018	Attorneys at Love	Mr. Forte	Short

=== Television ===
Year	Film	Role	Notes
1990	Carol & Company	Various	Main role
1992	Beverly Hills, 90210	Jay Thurman	3 episodes
1992	Seinfeld	Tim	Episode: "The Limo"
1994	Ellen	Tim	Episode: "The Hand That Robs the Cradle"
1995	Caroline in the City	Peter Welmerling	Episode: "Caroline and the Opera"
1995	Brotherly Love	Tom	Episode: "Double Date"
1995	If Not for You	Elliot	5 episodes
1995	The Great Defender	Crosby Caufield III	8 episodes
1995–1997	Cybill	Kevin Manning	23 episodes
1996	The Drew Carey Show	Tom	Episode: "Drew Gets Motivated"
1997	3rd Rock from the Sun	Peter Connolly	Episode: "A Friend in Dick"
1998	Party of Five	Daniel Musser	3 episodes
1998	Style & Substance	Steve	Episode: "Pilot"
1998–2000	Sports Night	Casey McCall	Main role
2001–2005	Six Feet Under	Nate Fisher	Main role
2006	The Lost Room	Detective Joe Miller	Main role
2007–2009	Dirty Sexy Money	Nick George	Main role Also producer
2010–2015	Parenthood	Adam Braverman	Main role
2016–2017	The Catch	Benjamin Jones	Main role
2016	Gilmore Girls: A Year in the Life	Park Ranger	Episode: "Fall"
2018–2025	9-1-1	Captain Robert Wade "Bobby" Nash	Main role (season 1–8); 123 episodes
2026–present	Line of Fire	Mike Hollingsworth	Main role

=== Theatre ===
Year	Title	Role	Notes	Ref.
2004	After the Fall	Quentin	Broadway; American Airlines Theatre, New York	

=== As director ===
Year	Title	Notes
2012–2014	Parenthood	Television series; 3 episodes

=== As producer ===
Year	Title	Notes
2006	Civic Duty	Movie
2008–2009	Dirty Sexy Money	Television series
2009	Got a Little Story: EPK	Video short; executive producer
2018–2025	9-1-1	Television series; executive producer
2026–present	Line of Fire	Producer

== Awards and nominations ==
Year	Association	Category	Nominated work	Result
2000	Screen Actors Guild Awards	Outstanding Performance by an Ensemble in a Comedy Series	Sports Night	Nominated
2000	Viewers for Quality Television	Best Actor in a Quality Comedy Series	Sports Night	Nominated
2002	Golden Globe Awards	Best Actor – Television Series Drama	Six Feet Under	Nominated
2002	Primetime Emmy Awards	Outstanding Lead Actor in a Drama Series	Six Feet Under	Nominated
2002	Screen Actors Guild Awards	Outstanding Performance by a Male Actor in a Drama Series	Six Feet Under	Nominated
2002	Screen Actors Guild Awards	Outstanding Performance by an Ensemble in a Drama Series	Six Feet Under	Nominated
2003	Golden Globe Awards	Best Actor – Television Series Drama	Six Feet Under	Nominated
2003	Primetime Emmy Awards	Outstanding Lead Actor in a Drama Series	Six Feet Under	Nominated
2003	Satellite Awards	Best Actor – Television Series Drama	Six Feet Under	Nominated
2003	Screen Actors Guild Awards	Outstanding Performance by an Ensemble in a Drama Series	Six Feet Under	Won
2004	Prism Awards	Best Performance in a Drama Series	Six Feet Under	Won
2004	Screen Actors Guild Awards	Outstanding Performance by a Male Actor in a Drama Series	Six Feet Under	Nominated
2004	Screen Actors Guild Awards	Outstanding Performance by an Ensemble in a Drama Series	Six Feet Under	Won
2005	Screen Actors Guild Awards	Outstanding Performance by an Ensemble in a Drama Series	Six Feet Under	Nominated
2006	Primetime Emmy Awards	Outstanding Lead Actor in a Drama Series	Six Feet Under	Nominated
2006	Screen Actors Guild Awards	Outstanding Performance by an Ensemble in a Drama Series	Six Feet Under	Nominated
