= Microphone (film) =

2010 film by Ahmad Abdalla

- International official poster of the film
- Directed by: Ahmad Abdalla
- Written by: Ahmad Abdalla
- Produced by: Mohamed Hefzy; Khaled Abol Naga
- Starring: Khaled Abol Naga; Menna Shalabi; Hany Adel; Yosra El Lozy
- Distributed by: Rotana Studios; Film Clinic
- Release date: 14 September 2010 (2010 Toronto International Film Festival)
- Running time: 122 minutes
- Country: Egypt
- Language: Arabic

Microphone (Arabic: ميكروفون) is a 2010 Egyptian independent film by Ahmad Abdalla about the underground art scene of the city of Alexandria, Egypt. The film received Best Arabic-language film Award from Cairo International Film Festival and Tanit d'Or from Journées cinématographiques de Carthage. In addition to Best Editing Award from Dubai International Film Festival in 2010.

Microphone is Ahmad Abdalla's second feature film, following Heliopolis.

== Plot ==
When Khaled returns to Alexandria after years of travel he discovers that it is too late to rekindle a relationship with his old love because she is about to immigrate and that his relationship with his aging father is broken beyond repair. Self-absorbed, he roams the city and stumbles over the underground art scene: hip-hop singers who perform on sidewalks, female rock musicians on rooftops Massive Scar Era (band), skateboarders cruising all over the city, graffiti artists who confront the city with their shocking murals in the darkness of the night. He is mesmerized by the discovery of this world and his life gradually changes. With his limited resources and connections, he tries to support this movement and draw attention to the diverse facets of his city. Details of his private life and events of this movement overlap. He awaits an inevitable change that he believes will come from the dynamic and unique art scene in Alexandria rather than from Cairo, Egypt's overpopulated capital. 'Microphone' is a vibrant image of this colorful music and art movement. It is a real narrative of this new generation of artists from Alexandria and the intricate details of their lives. It is the first Egyptian movie to feature the local skateboarding scene

== Festival and awards ==
Microphone was the first Egyptian film to win the prestigious award The Golden Tanit in Carthage film festival in October 2010.

=== 2011 ===
- Won— Großer Preis der Stadt Freistadt from Festival Der neue Heimatfilm
- Won— Golden Tulip from Istanbul International Film Festival
- Won— Griot Best Film Award of African Film Festival of Tarifa
- Won— Special Mention from Granada International Film Festival Cines del Sur

=== 2010 ===
- Won— Best Arabic-language film Award from Cairo International Film Festival
- Won— Best Film from Alexandria International Film Festival
- Won— Tanit d'or from Journées cinématographiques de Carthage
- Won— Best Editing Award from Dubai International Film Festival
- Nominated— Toronto International Film Festival
- Nominated— London International Film Festival
- Nominated— Golden Alexander Thessaloniki International Film Festival
- Nominated— Festival International du Film d'Amour de Mons in Brussels, Belgium

== Cast ==
- Khaled Abol Naga (Khaled)
- Menna Shalabi (Hadeer)
- Yosra El Lozy (Salma)
- Hany Adel (Hany)
- Ahmed Magdi (Magdi)
- Atef Youssef
- Aya Tarek (Aya)
- Yassin Koptan (Yassin)
- Mohamed Goda (Nosair)
- Cherine Amr (Cherine)
