= Basra (2008 film) =

- Directed by: Ahmed Rashwan
- Screenplay by: Ahmed Rashwan
- Produced by: Dream Production Reelfilms Productions
- Starring: Bassem Samra; Yara Goubran; Eyad Nassar; Nahed El Sebai; Christine Solomon
- Cinematography: Victor Credi
- Edited by: Nadia Hassan
- Music by: Sherif Elwesseimy
- Release date: 2008
- Running time: 94 minutes
- Country: Egypt

Basra is a 2008 Egyptian film.

== Synopsis ==
Cairo, March 17, 2003. The US-UK strike against Iraq is imminent. How can an Egyptian photographer, in his thirties, surpass his own disappointments and fears? How can he find an answer to the existential questions pertaining to life, death, sex and logic amidst his awareness of all the absurdity around him? Can this artist remain alive (breathing, thinking, and photographing) and survive this oppressive atmosphere? Or is he going to fall with Baghdad?

== Prizes ==
- Mostra de Valencia 2008
- El Cairo 2008
- Cine Árabe, Róterdam, 2009
- Cine Árabe, Bruselas, 2009
