= Khaled Abol Naga =

Egyptian actor (born 1966)

Khaled Abol Naga خالد أبو النجا
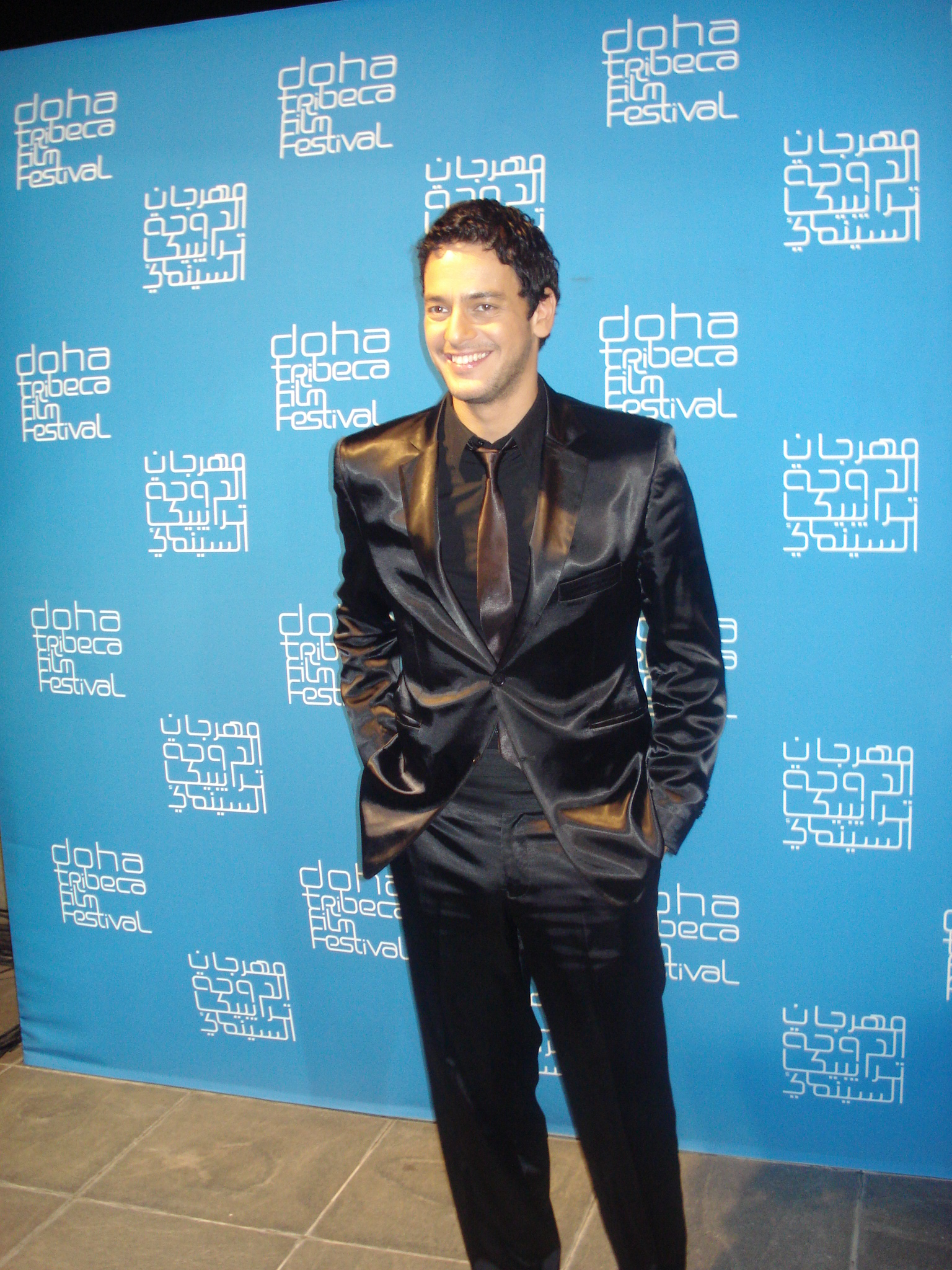
- Kal-el Naga at Doha Tribeca Film Festival in Qatar 2009
- Born: Khaled Samy Abol Naga; 2 November 1966 (age 60); Cairo, Egypt
- Education: Ain Shams University
- Occupations: Actor; Film producer; Film director
- Years active: 1989–present
- Website: Kalnaga.com

Khaled Abol Naga (Arabic: خالد أبو النجا), also known as Kal, or Kal El naga, is an Egyptian American actor, director, and producer. He is recognized primarily for his work in Egypt and the Middle East, but has increasingly ventured into American and British film and television roles since 2006. While studying theatre at The American University in Cairo, he started acting and directing (English and Arabic language) plays and musicals in Egypt.

Beginning his professional acting career in 2000, Naga starred in several movies through the next decade with roles encompassing several genres, from musicals such as None but that! (2007), to action such as Agamista (2007) and ''Eyes Of A Thief'' (2014), to thrillers such as Kashf Hesab (2007), to art-house such as Heliopolis (2009), Villa 69 (2013), and Decor (2014), to slapstick comedy such as Habibi Naêman (Sleeping Habibi) (2008). Additionally, he has participated in several European film festivals, receiving various awards as an actor and producer.

Since 2016, he has acted in several English-speaking roles, such as Tyrant on FX, History Channel's Vikings, and the BBC's TV mini-series The Last Post, and the Netflix Show Messiah in 2019. In a film festival in 2016 that celebrated Arab film submissions to the Oscars, he was noted as having the most number of submission in Arabic films to the Academy Award for Best Foreign Language Film (The Oscars). He has been tagged in western media as "Egypt's Brad Pitt", and he has also been described as "the next Omar Sharif," especially after his American debut movie Civic Duty in 2007.

Chosen as a Goodwill Ambassador for UNICEF in 2007, Naga played a pivotal role in child rights awareness, as well as the very first HIV awareness campaigns in Egypt and the Arab world, and participated in several international causes, including advocating for democracy in his home country, Egypt. He is one of the most recognizable celebrity faces of the 2011 Egyptian Revolution, taking part in mass demonstrations in Cairo that led to the removal of President Mubarak. He faced defamation campaigns against him by the state-owned media during the Mubarak era before the January 25th, 2011 revolution in Egypt, and several times again from the 2013 "coup d'etat" General Sisi government in Egypt in retaliation for his advocacy about the deterioration of human rights, especially the situation of Egyptian youth.

He was also a host for prime-time shows on many Arab TV networks from 1997 until 2005.

In recent years, Kal has returned to his musical roots, writing and producing original songs as a singer-songwriter under the name Khaled Abol Naga, also styled as KALNAGA & Captain Dodi. His music blends Egyptian Arabic with English and other languages, drawing on his bicultural identity to create bilingual and multilingual tracks aimed at audiences across the Middle East, Europe, Africa and the USA. His releases are produced through Tanasi.club, a music production outlet he runs with friends and collaborators, and are available on all major streaming platforms, including Spotify and Apple Music.

== Early years ==
Khaled Abol Naga was born on 2 November 1966 in Heliopolis, a cosmopolitan neighborhood of Cairo, Egypt. His father, the late Egyptian army major General Mohamed-Sami Aboul-Naga (Arabic: اللواء أ.ح / محمد-سامي السيد أبو النجا), came from a traditional family of major landowners in ad-Daqahliyah, Aga, Egypt where the land was mostly confiscated during the Nasser revolution of 1952 and its Land reform in Egypt. His mother claimed he is a descendant of the Islamic prophet Muhammad through Fatima Az-Zahraa and Imam Husayn ibn Ali, son of Ali ibn Abi Talib. He is the younger brother of American-based Egyptian architect Tarek Naga and architect Seif Abol Naga, who appeared in the classic film Empire M.

During his childhood, Khaled Abol Naga spent much of his time with his elder brother Tarek, who lives in the US, and whom he has said had a significant influence on his character growing up. Khaled was naturally interested in acting at an early age and appeared in a film (Madness of Love) starring Naglaa Fathi. He attended St. George's College school for his primary education, graduated as an electrical telecommunications engineer from Ain Shams University Faculty of Engineering (ASUFE), and the American University in Cairo where he studied Computer Science with a minor in Theater and Drama. He played water polo for his varsity team while based in Europe (1986–9), worked part-time as a fashion model (1993–6), and was a late-night talk show host and radio presenter in the late 1990s.

He joined the theatre department at The American University in Cairo, where he had the opportunity to discover his acting talent in the university's drama productions. In 1997, he left for the United States for more independent studies of his passion, filmmaking. There, he studied film acting, cinematography, and directing. He cited his acting teacher, Dr Mahmoud Al Lozy, as his mentor who influenced him the most.

== Acting career ==
The first phase of Naga's acting career (1989–2002) was largely on stage (in the theatre). However, he began hosting TV talk shows in 1998, contributing to his popularity as a media personality in Egypt and Arabic-speaking states. His television and film work has included a variety of different genres. After co-producing and acting in the 2009 independent film Heliopolis by first-time director Ahmad Abdalla, he starred in a second film, Microphone, which he also co-produced with Mohamed Hefzy in 2010. From 2010 onwards, Abol Naga mostly played the lead of much more diverse and complex roles, continued to win numerous awards as an actor and as a producer from regional and international prestigious film festivals. Appointed as a jury member and sometimes jury head of regional and international film festivals.

=== Film ===
Naga's acting career began in 1977 when he was still a child with a part in the Egyptian film Madness of Love (Arabic: جنون الحب) (aka: Genoun El Hob) (aka: La Folie De L'amore). Since then, he has appeared in various films, including psychological thrillers, romances, and musical comedies.

In 2001, his film career gained momentum when he director Daoud Abdel Sayed chose him for the lead in A Citizen, An Informant And A Thief (Mowaten we Mokhber we Haramy) (Arabic: مواطن و مخبر و حرامي). In 2002, he demonstrated his talent for singing in the musical comedy Wust El-Balad ("Downtown"). He was then offered a part in "Sleepless Nights" (aka: "Sahar El Layali"), which became a box office hit in 2003–2004. Later in the same year, Abol Naga was awarded Best Actor at the Damascus International Film Festival and the Best Actor Award from the Paris Arab Cinema Biennale of the Institute du Monde Arabe IMA Film Festival.

After "Sleepless Nights," aka: Sahar El Layali, Abol Naga acted in more films in a short period of time. In 2004, he played naval officer Lt Hasan Hosny in Yom El Karama (Dignity Day), followed by his character Kimo in the popular romantic comedy Hob El Banat (Girl's Love). In 2005–2006, he appeared in several more films: Italia's War, Malek wa Ketaba (Heads and Tails), and the romantic comedy Banat West El Balad (Downtown Girls).

In 2006, he appeared as the lead in Leabet el hob (The Game of Love) – for which he received Best Actor at the Alexandra International Film Festival. He also appeared in Tamer El-Bustani's independent short film: Qutat Baladi (Stray Cats). In the same year he was introduced to English speaking audiences in the role of Gabe Hassan in the American/Canadian production Civic Duty, It premiered at Tribecca film Festival in New york, and nominated at the Cairo International Film Festival 2007, his performance created a lot of attention to his talent and since then was often described by media as the next Omar Sharif.

In a review of In the Heliopolis Flat, Mohamed El-Assyouti of Al-Ahram Weekly noted a tendency for Abol Naga "to have been type-cast as the middle-class romantic star co-lead in almost all his films this year". His subsequent portrayal of Farid in the crime mystery Kashf Hesab gained him more positive critical attention. The same year, Abol Naga played the lead Ez in the action/thriller/drama Agamista. In 2008, he portrayed Ramez in the comedy Habibi Naeman. In 2009, he appeared as a lead character in One-Zero and then produced and appeared as the lead in first-time director Ahmad Abdalla's Heliopolis as Ibrahim. In 2010, he continued the working relationship by starring in and co-producing Abdalla's second film: Microphone. Originally due for mainstream release in Cairo on January 26, 2011, the film was re-released after the protests in Tahrir Square and won numerous awards and gained regional and worldwide acclaim.

Naga has a record of being present at international film festivals, as a performer or a jury member. In 2009–2010, attended 12 international film festivals including the Venice Film Festival, Toronto's TIFF, Vancouver's VIFF, Cairo's CIFF, Abu Dhabi's ADIFF, Doha Tribeca Film Festival, London's BFI, and Thessaloniki FF, inviting him either as a jury member or as an actor in his award-winning movies "Microphone", "One-Zero" or "Heliopolis".

In an interview in 2010, Abol Naga said, "From the industry side, my biggest challenge is to find original roles".

Naga achieved a historical winning of all important Best Actor Awards offered in Egypt in 2014(Egypt's National Film Festival, Film Society Festival for Egyptian Cinema, Egyptian Catholic Center for Cinema Festival) for his role in "Villa 69" as well as winning The Best Actor award (SILVER PYRAMID) from The prestigious Cairo International Film Festival for his role in the Palestinian submission to the OSCAR's "Eyes of a thief" among other regional Best Actor awards, in the same year, he also won several regional awards for his incredible portrayal of an older man Hussein in "Villa 69" including the Best Actor Award from Festival du Cinema Africain Khouribga, Morocco (Khaled is the Lead Actor & Executive-Producer)

=== Theatre ===
Naga's theatre work started in 1989 with his university plays at The Department of Theatre, Drama and Music of the American university in Cairo, his work as a theatrical actor included a variety of roles; in some instances like Mahfouz-yat (1990) and Two Underground (1994) he has played more than one role in a single production, in the production of Lionel Bart's musical Oliver!, he played Bill Sikes as well as worked as an assistant director to Walter Eyesslinck, He collected few awards as an actor and director of varsity plays.

In 2010, he became involved as the filming director of the student play production of The BuSSy monologues – "True stories about young men and women in Egypt".

On Saturday 13 April 2013, the play written by Nassim Soleimanpour, White Rabbit Red Rabbit that was performed by an array of A-list actors around the world, was performed for the first time in Arabic in Cairo by Naga, who knew nothing of the play before he stood on the stage, as it is an experimental play; "This was a role for which I was prepared the most; you are always instructed not to do any preparation for the role [before reading the script]," said Abol Naga. The actor then revealed what intrigued him most about the play: "I liked that the meaning of the play is buried within the script, and I was unveiling it [as I read] with you. Sometimes I repeated the statements I thought were important," explained Abol Naga.

In September 2013, in a stage play reading in Arabic; Cancelled, Khaled Abol Naga takes on the lead role of Hassan, the director, and doing an impersonation of a talented, kind hearted and easily irritated director-professor who loves his students, but constantly criticizes them and the entire generation to which they belong.

In September 2015, a unique musical opened at The Royal Cultural Centre of Amman, Jordan. He directed the first-ever Arabic production of the acclaimed West End musical Oliver! by Lionel Bart. His unique and original adaptation swaps Dickensian London for a contemporary Arab city (Amman in the Jordan production). He created an adaptation with the well-known Disney writer Zeinab Mobarak that smartly kept the original Charles Dickens spirit and transported all the original songs and lyrics to the contemporary Arab culture. Maestro Nayer Nagui conducted the orchestra and coached the children in singing marathon lessons held in Jordan, mostly with Syrian refugee children.

Theatre work
Year	Title	Production	Role	Director
1989	Oliver! Musical by Lionel Bart	AUC, Egypt	Bill Sikes	Larry P. Caitlin & Walter Eysselinck
1990	Mahfouz-yat Naguib Mahfouz	AUC, Egypt	Multiple characters	Tarek Ghaleb
1990	Truly, Madly, Deeply (Arabic: .بجد، بجنون، بعمق) Adaptation by Khaled Abol Naga based on Anthony Minghella’s film by the same title	Hanager theatre, Cairo Opera House, Egypt The Independent Free Theatre Festival, (Arabic: مهرجان المسرح الحر الآول) (WON Best Theatrical Troupe Award of the festival) AL QAFELA (The Caravan)	Acted, Written & Directed the play	Khaled Abol Naga
1991	Death Song (Arabic: أغنية الموت) Naguib Mahfouz	AUC, Egypt	Elwan	Ihab Shawi
1994 1995	Two Underground (Arabic: اتنين تحت الارض) M Salmawy	1994 AUC, Egypt 1995 Sheraton theatre, Cairo, Egypt	Dr Labeeb and Sheikh (Maazoun)	Ahmed Zaki
1996	Lovestruck (Arabic: رصاصة في القلب) Tawfiq al-Hakim	AUC, Egypt	Naguib	Mahmoud El Lozy
2002	Wust Al Balad (musical)	Salam theatre, Cairo, Egypt	Ramadan and Romeo	Naser Abdel Menem
2013	White Rabbit Red Rabbit by Nassim Soleimanpour	D-CAF festival, Falaki theatre, Cairo, Egypt 13 April 2013	Narrator (World renowned experimental one man show)	Iranian writer Nassim Soleimanpour
2013	"Cancelled" Play stage reading (in Arabic)	Falaki theatre, AUC, Egypt September 2013	Hassan (The Director)	Written & Directed by Dr. Mahmoud El Lozy
2015	Oliver! in Arabic Musical by Lionel Bart, Arabisation & Lyrics by Zeinab Mobarak	Royal Cultural Centre of Amman, Jordan(special licence from Cameron Mackintosh) Refuge Drama	Creator, Executive Producer & Director	Khaled Abol Naga Musical Director: Nayer Nagui
2018	Drowning In Cairo Directed Play stage reading (English version)	Brava Theatre, San Francisco. New Threads, GoldenThread productions.	Director, Script development for the writer.	writer: Adam Ashraf Elsayigh directed by Kal Naga June 5, 2018
2020 upcoming	NOURA Play at The Guthrie Theater Mnpls MN	NOURA @ GUTHRIE THEATER	Rafa'a	Writer: Heather Raffo, Director: Taibi Magar,

=== Television ===
As a TV host, Abol Naga, in 1999, was offered several opportunities to host different television programs on the variety channel of the Nile TV Network of ERTU. In 2000, he was awarded Best New TV Announcer (Egypt). He was later chosen to host the popular Good Morning Egypt TV show of ERTU, which he presented until 2001. He hosted a popular live talk show, Eshar Ma'ana (translates: Spend the night with us). After leaving Nile Variety channel in 2000, he hosted the Muzikana TV show about the Arab music top charts for MBC TV, which brought him recognition across Arabic-speaking states.

As an actor on TV, he first appeared and attracted attention to his talent in his award-winning (Seif el Daly), a male lead role in the Egyptian TV mini-series El Banat in 2003, then after his cinematic box office hit Sahar El-Layaly as the lead (Omar) in Leila's Mad Man, aka: Magnoon Laila (Arabic: مجنون ليلي), a very successful TV mini-series in 2007 broadcast all over the Arab region and won him several awards later.

In 2016, he focused on the English speaking markets as he appeared in an American Fox TV production (Tyrant season 3) in a main role of an Islamic cleric sheik Al-Qadi – (a recurring guest role in 10/10 episodes), then he had a celebrated guest role as the Emir of Kairouan: Ziyadat-Allah – (a guest role in 2 episodes) on the History channel hit TV show Vikings (season 5) airing in Canada in 2017, as well as a BBC TV mini-series in a guest recurring role, The Informant – (in 6/6 episodes) of The Last Post (TV mini-series). He is announced to appear on Messiah, a new Netflix episodic TV series in 2020.

=== Radio ===
As a presenter, Abol Naga created and hosted BBCe!, a weekly bilingual radio program in Arabic and English. This is a co-production with the BBC World Service and airs on several ERTU radio stations within Egypt. BBCe was short listed for the BBC World Service Innovation Award in January 2007.

As an actor, Naga has performed in several ERTU radio productions (Ramadan seasons) as a voice actor. In 2003, he played a main role among an all-star cast as Sherif in Ahlam El Sabaya (translates: The Girl's Dreams), directed by Hosny Ghoneim. The following year, he performed as the lead Tarek in the romantic comedy radio drama Back to Love (directed by Hessein Ibrahim) (2004).

== Humanitarian work ==
Naga has used his status as a film star in the Arab region, and even before that as a TV celebrity, to raise awareness for various issues in Egypt and the Middle East. Among others, he played a pivotal role in the pro-democracy movement that culminated in the Tahrir square Egyptian revolution of January 25, 2011. He organized events and concerts in support of religious tolerance. He advocated strongly to support Egyptian minorities, as in the case of the violence against the copts. He was also one of the very early voices that supported taboo subjects in Egypt and the region, like HIV awareness and FGM horrific practices.

In 2005, Naga joined the Make Poverty History campaign.

He was appointed a UNICEF Goodwill Ambassador in 2007. On April 21, 2008, the UNICEF partnership was renewed. Throughout his involvement, Abol Naga has addressed several taboo issues affecting children in Egypt, including HIV/AIDS, female genital mutilation (FGM), children's rights, street children, and adolescents’ development.

In 2009, he celebrated Egypt's Orphans' Day (April 3) with children participating in Doodle4Google, an art event that encouraged orphaned children to create variants of the Google logo to reflect their Egyptian identity at the German University in Cairo.

He is a strong supporter (and directed the 2010 filmed version) of the play: The BuSSy monologues. It originated as a student storytelling play in 2005. It was inspired by Eve Ensler's Vagina Monologues. The play was constructed of hundreds of acts based on real letters of true but taboo stories of young women and men from Egypt. It culminated in a show in 2010 that covered controversial gender topics affecting youth in Egypt, and was struggling to find any theatre in Cairo to accept its production, hence the idea of filming it to document the play in a filmed version. Abol Naga directed and produced with others a filmed version in 2010 after being invited by the students to watch it in the parking lot of the Cairo Opera house!.

He was also an ambassador for Y-Peer: An international youth network concerned with informing and empowering youth on issues such as sexuality and reproductive health, that was begun by the United Nations Population Fund (UNFPA).

He has supported the Hands Across the Middle East Support Alliance (HAMSA), a non-profit, non-sectarian Human Rights organisation, by acting as a celebrity judge for the "Dream Deferred Essay Contest".

In 2010, he supported Crisis Action's Sudan365 campaign, launched in January that year, to promote peace in Sudan at its Cairo event.

At a special launch of The State of the World's Children by UNICEF Egypt in April 2010, Abol Naga identified his priorities as: "an Egypt free of female genital mutilation, an Egypt where clean water and proper sewage systems were available nationwide, an Egypt where there was equality between all children, regardless of their religion or gender, and an Egypt where there was equality in education and where children were protected from the effects of climate change."

He participated in the first TEDx Cairo in May of the same year at the American University.

In the wake of the January 1, 2011 Alexandria bombing, Abol Naga visited the victims and survivors in hospitals, and led candlelit vigils denouncing violence against copts and to promote religious tolerance in Egypt. On January 10, he organised and hosted the "Microphone for Alexandria" concert with musicians who had appeared in Microphone (2010). The concert aimed to raise funds for the victims and promote solidarity between Christian and Muslim Egyptians.

In late January 2011, he participated in the Egyptian Revolution in Tahrir Square, having been a signatory to Mohamed ElBaradei's manifesto for political reform, Together for Change, on March 28, 2010, with other filmmakers and directors. While in Tahrir, he took live footage and photographs and recorded audio casts, which were later uploaded to the internet. He was interviewed several times in English, once by Ayman Mohyeldin of Al Jazeera and several times by the BBC regarding the protests. Al-Ahram Weekly later reported that he was involved in an altercation with plainclothes police in which he was assaulted and then deleted the news! He reported that he has an ongoing lifetime project working on collating his footage and photographs of the uprising in Tahrir Square 2011, documenting the massive protests against President Mohamed Morsi of the Muslim Brotherhood in November 2012, the military coup in 2013, and ongoing.

=== Goodwill Ambassador for UNICEF Egypt (2007–2015) ===
Outline of his social work:

- 2015: – Out to the Sea – Droses – Alexandria Bibliotheca, Plastic is not Fantastic Awareness event and campaign
- 2014: – UNICEF Child Rights campaign CRC 25
- 2013: – UNICEF Assiut Clean water pipes connection project – UNICEF MAZA LAW campaign
- 2012: – UNICEF social media launch, – UN girl day celebration, and meetings against FGM, Early Marriage
- 2011: – UNICEF Universities Film Festival 2011
- 2010: – UNAIDS regional top level policy making meeting, Dubai 2010
- 2010: – Clean Water campaign, Child Rights Campaign, Orphans day pyramids event, AIDS/HIV awareness TV spots, Children Film Festival Creativity seminar, and workshop for 1-minute short films by children.
- 2009: – Child Rights campaign CRC 2009
- 2008: – Gaza border visit of the wounded Palestinian kids – HIV awareness campaigns with UNAIDS and UNICEF – Anti Khetan FGM campaigns
- 2007: April: Appointed UNICEF National Goodwill Ambassador. March: Visit to HIV-related projects in Alexandria. February 2007: Participated in a seminar on the media and HIV/AIDS at the Cairo Children's Film Festival. January 2007: Participated in a seminar and a Youth awareness workshop event about the National Egyptian HIV/AIDS campaign at Ismailia, Suez
- 2006: November 2006: Participated in the launch of Unite for Children, Unite against AIDS & Hepatitis C Campaign Awards

=== Awards ===
Naga has won many awards as an actor, especially in 2004 for Sleepless Nights and in 2014 for Villa 69 and Eyes of a Thief. And as a producer in 2013–2014 for Villa 69 and in 2010–2011 for Microphone, a film considered a classic and one of the few independent films listed as one of the 100 greatest films in the history of Arab cinema.

== Awards as an actor, producer, director ==
Year	=== Awards as an actor ===	For
2016	Outstanding Arab Achievement Award, Hassi-Messaoud 1st Cinematic meetings 2016, Algeria	(for being the most submitted Arab Actor in Arabic films to the Academy Awards® (Award for Foreign Film)
2014	Best Actor Award, The Silver Pyramid CIFF Cairo International Film Festival	Eyes of a Thief (Palestinian film) (Lead Actor)
2014	Best Actor Award, The Festival du Cinema Africain Khouribga, Morocco	Villa69 (Lead Actor & Executive-Producer)
2014	Best Male Actor, (HORUS Award), The 18th National Film Festival for Egyptian Cinema 2014	Villa69 (Lead Actor & Executive-Producer)
2014	Best Actor Award, The 40th Annual Film Society's Festival for Egyptian Cinema	Villa69 (Lead Actor & Executive-Producer)
2014	Best Actor Award, The 62nd Edition of Egyptian Catholic Center's Film Festival for Egyptian Cinema 2013	Villa69 (Lead Actor & Executive-Producer)
2012	Special Achievement Award, Alexandria International Film Festival for Mediterranean Nations 2012, Human Rights Award for Best Actor that expressed human rights over the past ten years history in Egyptian cinema	Human Rights Award (Best Actor in films who expressed human rights over the past ten years history in Egyptian cinema)
2011	Honorary Achievement Award, MÅLMÖ Arab Film Festival, Sweden	Honours the star Khaled Abol Naga for his excellent performance during his time as an actor
2009	Best Actor, ART NETWORK TV Awards	LEILA's MAD MAN aka: Magnoon Laila (TV mini series)
2006	Best Actor, The 22nd Alexandria International Film Festival 2006	Game of Love (aka : Leabet el Hob)
2005	Best Actor Achievement, Horeyaty Annual Awards	Harb Atalia (Male co-Lead)
2004	Best Actor Award, The 53rd Edition of Egyptian Catholic Center's Film Festival for Egyptian Cinema 2004	El Banat (TV mini-series) (Male Lead)
2004	Best Actor Award, Biennale of Arab Cinema, Institute Du Monde Arabe (IMA) 2004	Sleepless Nights aka: "Sahar el Layaly" (Lead Actor) shared with ensemble cast
2004	Best Actor, Egyptian Cinema Oscars Awards 2014, Film Art Society	Sleepless Nights (Lead Actor), shared with ensemble cast.
2004	Best Actor, ART NETWORK Cinema Awards	'Sleepless Nights Sahar el Layaly aka: "Sahar el Layaly" (Lead Actor) shared with ensemble cast'
2003	Best Actor, The 13th Damascus International Film Festival.	'Sleepless Nights Sahar el Layaly aka: "Sahar el Layaly" (Lead Actor) shared with ensemble cast'
2003	Special Mention, Arabic Competition for Long Feature Films, 27th Cairo International Film Festival CIFF 2003	Girl's Love (aka: Hob El Banat) (2003) (Lead Actor)
	=== Awards as a producer ===	For
2014	*Several local Egyptian Best Film Awards,	Villa69 (Lead Actor & Executive-Producer)
2013	Special Jury Award, New Horizons Competition, Abu Dhabi Film Festival	Villa69 (Lead Actor & Executive-Producer)
2011	Golden Tulip Award, International Competition's Best Film, The 30th Istanbul Film Festival, Turkey	MICROPHONE (Lead Actor & Co-Producer)
2011	Special Jury Mention, The Granada Film Festival Cines del Sur, Spain	MICROPHONE (Lead Actor & Co-Producer)'
2010	Best Film Award : El Festival de Cine Africano de Tarifa, Seville, Spain	MICROPHONE (Lead Actor & Co-Producer)'
2010	Best Film Award : GOLD TANIT, JCC Chartage Cinematic days Festival (Tanit d'Or, Journees cinematographiques de Carthage), Tunisia	MICROPHONE (Lead Actor & Co-Producer)'
2010	Best Arabic Film Award, Arabic Competition for Long Feature Films, The Cairo International Film Festival CIFF 2010	MICROPHONE (Lead Actor & Co-Producer)'
2009	Special Mention, Arabic Film Competition, The 33rd Cairo International Film Festival 2009	HELIOPOLIS (Actor & Co-Producer)
	=== Awards as a director ===	For
1996	Best Installation SOL STAR by Lita Albuquerque, SOL STAR Short Art Film by Khaled Abol Naga (writer/director) Giza Plateau for the 6th Cairo International Biennale, Cairo, Egypt	SOL STAR Short Video-Art part of installation
1990	Best theatrical troupe award to (The Caravan troupe), The Independent Free Theatre Festival, (Arabic: مهرجان المسرح الحر الآول) Hanager theatre, Cairo Opera House, Egypt	Truly, Madly, Deeply (Arabic: .بجد، بجنون، بعمق) Adaptation by Khaled Abol Naga based on Anthony Minghella's film by same title
	=== Other awards ===	For
2000	Best New TV Announcer, Good Morning Egypt TV show, (ERTU, Egypt)	Eshar Maana, Variety TV channel, Nile TV network

== Jury appointments ==
Khaled Abol Naga has been appointed as a jury member or head of jury in numerous local or international film festivals since 2008, here are some of his appointments:

Date	Jury appointment	Festival or event	Country	Online link / source
2016	Jury member	Tangiers Film Festival 2016	Morocco	http://www.festivaldetanger.com/main/?page_id=862
2013	Jury President	Abu Dhabi Film Festival, Child Protection Award	UAE	http://www.sanadfilmfund.com/en/archive/2013/juries
2012	International Jury member	Cairo International Film Festival (CIFF) FIAPF member*	Egypt	http://ciff.org.eg/en/info/archive#35
2012	Jury Head	Royal Film Commission, EU Mobile Short Film Fest.	Jordan	http://www.film.jo/NewsView.aspx?NewsId=39
2011	Jury member	Istanbul !f Inspired International Film Competition 2011	Turkey	http://www.ifistanbul.com/en/archive/2011/ http://www.vandertastic.com/index.php?module=site&code=show_cat&id_cat=1
2010	Jury member	Festival International du Film d'Amour, Mons, 2010 (26^{e} édition)	Belgium	Festival International du Film d'Amour, Mons
2011	Jury member	MÅLMÖ Arab Film Festival 2011	Sweden	http://maffswe.com/archive-2011/
2010	Jury member	Abu Dhabi Film Festival 2010, New Horizons Awards	UAE	http://www.sanadfilmfund.com/en/archive/2010/juries
2010	Jury member	Tallinn Black Nights Film Festival PÖFF, Eurasia Program 2010, FIAPF member*	Estonia	http://2010.poff.ee/eng/festival-2010/juries/eurasia-jury
2009	Jury member	Rotterdam Arabic Film Festival 2009,	Netherlands	https://arabfilmfestival.nl/ https://www.youtube.com/watch?v=aOB8LL6eXhs
2009	Jury member	Beirut International Film Festival, 9’th. BIFF	Lebanon	http://www.beirutfilmfestival.org/2009-9th-edition-photos/
2008	Jury member	Catholic Center Film Festival for Egyptian cinema 2008	Egypt	http://www.elcinema.com/en/festival/1000160
2009–2016	Jury voter	International Emmy® Awards (International Academy of Television Arts & Sciences)	USA	International Emmy® Awards<

== Filmography ==
=== Television ===
- 2020: MESSIAH (season 1) : NETFLIX TV series – airing 1 Jan 2020 YACOB – (Guest role in 3/10 episodes)
- 2019: THE LAST POST (season 1): BBC TV mini series – airing in UK 2018 The Informant – (Guest role in 6/6 episodes)
- 2017: VIKINGS (season 5): History Channel TV show – airing in Canada Feb.2017 Ziyadat-Allah – (Guest role in 2 episodes)
- 2016: TYRANT (season 3): FX Networks TV show – USA Sept.2016 AL-Qadi – (Guest main role in 10/10 episodes)
- 2007: LEILA's MAD MAN aka: Magnoon Laila : TV mini series – Egypt 2007 Omar – (Lead Series Regular role in 15/15 Episodes) WON several local Popular Voting Best Actor Awards
- 2003: EL BANAT : TV mini series – Egypt 2003 Seif – (Lead Series Regular role in 30/30 Episodes) Won Best Actor Award at 2003 Catholic center Film Festival

=== Shorts and documentaries ===
- 2017: The Unknown Sweet Potato Seller (Short) Director: Ahmed Roshdy - (Khaled Acted & co-produced)
- 2016: Nasser's Republic, The Making of Modern Egypt (Doccu.) Director: Michal Goldman (Khaled played Nasser’s Voice-Over) CIFF 2016,
- 2015: Camera Obscura (Short) Director: Nour Zaki - (Khaled : Actor & co-producer) World Premiere in 1 minute shorts at The Oscars 2015

=== Feature films ===
- MISS FISHER AND THE CRYPT OF TEARS (2020): Australian TV Feature Film- release Feb. 2020 – (Main character)
- Out of The Ordinary (2015) [Egypt] Director: Daoud Abdel Sayed - Dr. Yehya – Lead character - Nominated for Best Actor in: Abu Dhabi Film Festival 2015
- Eyes Of A Thief (2014) [Palestine] Director: Najwa Najjar – Tarek Khedr - The Lead character - Palestine’s nomination to the Oscars 2014 - Won Best Actor Award : Cairo International Film Festival 2014 - Several other nominations, ...
- From A to B (2014) [UAE] Director: Ali Mustafa - Syrian Officer – Guest role - Nominated in: Abu Dhabi Film Festival 2014, Cairo Int’l Film Festival 2014
- Decor (2014) [Egypt] Director: Ahmad Abdalla - Cherif - Male co-Lead character - London BFI Film Festival 2014 - Cairo Int’l Film Festival 2014
- Villa 69 (2013) [Egypt] Director: Ayten Amin – Hussein- Lead Character and Executive Producer – WON Best Actor Award – National Film Festival for Egyptian Cinema 2014 – Won Best Actor Award – Khoribga African Film Festival 2014 – WON Best Actor Award – Cathothoc Center Film Festival for Egyptian Cinema 2014 – WON Best Actor Award – Egypt’s 40th Film Society Film Festival 2014 – Won Best Actor Award – several other
- Bussy Monologues (2013) [Egypt] - Director & Producer of the Filmed Monologues, http://www.Bussy.TV
- Microphone (2010) [Egypt] Director: Ahmad Abdalla – Khaled – Main character & co-producer - WON Tunis Chartage Gold Tanit Best Film Award 2010, Won Cairo Int’l Film Festival Best Arabic Film Award 2010, Won Dubai Film Festival Best Editing Award 2010, Won Istanbul Film Festival Gold Tulip Best Film Award 2011 Toronto Film Festival 2010, Vancouver FF 2010, Dubai Film Festival 2010, London BFI 2010, several other festivals
- Heliopolis (2009) [Egypt] Director: Ahmad Abdalla - Actor & Co-producer - WON Special mention CIFF 2009, Palm Springs IFF 2009, Toronto Film Festival 2009, Vancouver FF 2009, MEIFF Abu-Dhabi 2009, Thessaloniki FF 2009, Marrakech IFF 2009, Stockholm FF 2009, several other festivals
- One-Zero (2009) [Egypt] Director: Kamla Abu Zekry - Cherif - Main character in ensemble cast - Nominated at Venice Film Festival 2009 Official New Horizon Competition - WON Brussels Film Festival 2009 Best Scenario & Jury special prize, Won 42 awards from several International and local Festivals
- Habibi Naeman (Sleeping Habibi) (2008) [Egypt] - Ramez – The Male Lead
- Agamista (2007) [Egypt] Director: Tarek Abdel Moaty – Co-Lead role
- In The Heliopolis Flat (2007) aka: Fi Shaket Masr El Gedida [Egypt] Director: Mohamed Khan – Yehya – The Male Lead - Won awards from several International and local Festivals
- Civic Duty (2007) [US/Canadian] Director: Jeff Renfroe – Gabe – co-Lead with Peter Krause - Nominated at Tribeca Film Festival 2007
- Kashf Hesab (2007) [Egypt] Director: Amir Ramsis – Farid – The Lead
- None but that! (2007) aka: Mafeesh Gher Keda! [Egypt] (Musical) Director: Khaled El Hagar – Male co-Lead
- A Game of Love (2006) [Egypt] Director: Mohamed Ali aka: Leabet El Hob – The Male Lead - WON Best Actor Award – Alexandria Int’l film festival 2006
- Italia's War (2005) [Egypt] Director: Ahmed Saleh - Fouad -Male co-Lead (Language:Italian & Arabic)
- Downtown Girls (2005) aka: Banat Wust El Balad [Egypt] Director: Mohamed Khan – Chef Samir – Main Supporting role
- Malek We Ketaba (2005) [Egypt] Director: Kamla Abu Zekry – Tarek – Main supporting role – Won several Best Film Awards
- Hob El Banat (2004) aka: Girl’s Love [Egypt] Director: Khaled El Hagar – Karim el sharkawy – Male co-Lead role- WON Special Mention at Cairo Int’l Film Festival 2004
- Yom El Karama aka: Dignity Day (2004) [Egypt] Director: Ali Abdel Khalek – Lt.N.Hassan Hosny – co-Lead role
- Sleepless Nights aka: Sahar El Layaly (2003) [Egypt] Director: Hani Khalifa - Ali – co-Lead male role (shared with 3 other) - Won Best Acting Award for the ensemble cast at The Institué Du Monde Arabe Film Festival 2003, Won Best Acting Award at Damascus Film Festival 2003, Won awards from several International and local Festivals
- Mowaten we Mokhber we Haramy (2001) aka: A citizen, a detective & a thief [Egypt] Director: Daoud Abdel Sayed – The citizen Selim – The male Lead – WON several Best Film Awards
- Rendez Vous (2000) [Egypt] Director: Ali Abdel Khalek – Ashraf – Male co-lead shared with 2 others
