= Girls (2007 film) =

- Arabic: بلد البناتِ, Balad El Banat
- Directed by: Amr Bayoumi
- Written by: Ola El Shafie
- Produced by: Hani Guirguis Fawzi
- Starring: Farah Youssef; Somaia Al Joaini; Christine Solomon; Reem Hijab; Farida Elgready; Maha Abu Oaf
- Edited by: Doa'a Fathi
- Music by: Amir Khalaf
- Production company: Egypt Studio-El Expra
- Distributed by: Hani Guirguis Fawzi
- Release date: 2007
- Running time: 102 minutes
- Country: Egypt
- Language: Arabic

Girls (Arabic: بلد البناتِ, Balad El Banat) is a film by an Egyptian Director, Amr Bayoumi, that was released in 2007 starring Farah Youssef, Somaia Al Joaini, Reem Hijab, Fareeda Al Juraidi. The film was written by Ola El Shafie and produced and distributed by Hani Guirguis Fawzi. The movie revolves around the life experiences of four girls in their early 20s as soon as they move to the city of Cairo alone with no parental guidance.

== Plot ==
The film shows the lives of these four students gathered in one room at a university in the city of Cairo. The movie begins with the four main characters in different villages. Salma, Farah, Heba, and Nihal are shown as children playing around in the village and learning what is right and wrong from their parents. After moving to Cairo, they enter a university and meet each other while living under the rules of the principal. After graduating from the school of Information Studies, they all move to an apartment together in a conservative area where they work for the press. The evolution of their careers and personal lives starts directly after they move to the apartment and are no longer under any surveillance. As a reaction to moving to a new apartment without being watched by anyone, the four of them start having a desire to experience socially inappropriate behaviors like smoking, drinking, dating, and partying. Sophiya, their neighbor, is a wise woman who acts like their mother and covers their inappropriate behavior when their fathers stop by the apartment to check on them.

Salma, the wisest of the four girls, searches for a job and as she finds the appropriate job that reflects her talents, the job interviewer sparks her attention and gets so intimate with her that she starts falling in love with him. After going out with him on several dates, and after several approaches by him, she still refuses his attempts to be sexual. She plans to surprise him on his birthday at his home, but discovers that he has been cheating on her with several women. She enters a phase of depression which motivates her to cut her hair really short.

The story then moves on to Farah, a girl that came from an extremely conservative Bedouin family and wears a veil at the beginning of the film. After graduating and moving into the apartment she decides to remove her veil and live a new life filled with freedom. As soon as she starts attending parties and gatherings with her friends, she meets a married man and begins seducing him since she has never experienced being loved by a man. After drinking and smoking with him, she gets into an affair for the first time in her life with him at his apartment. She continues to have an affair and experiences nightmares that reflect the mistake she has done. Nihal, one of the four girls, gets angry with Farah returning home really late. She considers it inappropriate since they live in a very conservative neighborhood. After Farah has a couple of affairs with the man, she gets really attached to him.

Nihal's life story begins with a relationship with an old married man. She acts like the wisest of the other three girls but seems to fall in the deepest mistakes. She tries to be overprotective of her friends by displaying a conservative attitude each time her friends do small mistakes, like arriving home late. She becomes angry at her friends when they are out having fun because she has always experienced a lack of attention from the old man she loves.

Heba, is the girl with the insecure personality. She avoids hanging out with her friends due to the acne that covers her face. She loves to read novels and watch movies as an activity to fulfill her needs and looking for love that does not show up. Whenever she tries to get into a relationship with a man, he tries avoiding her which depresses her most of the time and lets her avoid meeting new men.

After the film introduces the four characters, the trouble begins when Farah tries to confront the man she gets pregnant from with the issue of her pregnancy. He refuses to help her by backing off, which leads Salma to stand by her side by paying the bill to abort the baby at the clinic. At the end of the film, they all realize that the way they have shaped their decisions is wrong and start determining their lives in a new way. Farah decides to go back to the village where she comes from, while Salma continues her work as a journalist. Furthermore, Heba remains insecure about looks but tries to live a normal life without depression. As for Nihal, she continues her journalistic career by giving a speech in a conference at the institution of civil and human rights advocating for women to have more rights in Egypt.

== Cast ==
- Farah Youssef as Heba
- Somaia Al Joaini as Nihal
- Christine Solomon as Gigi (voice)
- Reem Hijab as Farah
- Fareeda Al Juraidi as Salma
- Maha Abu Oaf as Sophiya

== Production ==
The film was produced by Hani Guirguis Fawzi and released in 2007. The production manager is Ahmed Zaki along with his production assistants: Mohammed Sotohi, Mohammed El Libi, Essam Mohammed, and Fayza Ahmed.

== Reception ==
Hani Guirguis Fawzi, the producer and distributor of Balad El Banat movie, has been charged by the Trades Union representatives with a certain amount of money for hiring actors in the film that were not permitted to act because they lack the license authorizing them to work as actors. Somaia Al Joaini, a non-Egyptian actress, also a main character in the film, was one of those actors that lacked the license to work in the film, which therefore, caused the Trade Union Representatives to sue the official film company for their illegal decisions of hiring actors not permitted to work. It was decided afterwards that Hani Gerge’s Company should be investigated further to confess their illegal act.
