= Rags and Tatters =

2013 film

- Film poster
- Directed by: Ahmad Abdalla
- Written by: Ahmad Abdalla
- Produced by: Mohamed Hefzy
- Starring: Asser Yassin
- Cinematography: Tarek Hefny
- Edited by: Hisham Saqr
- Distributed by: Rotana Studios
- Release date: 9 September 2013 (TIFF)
- Running time: 87 minutes
- Country: Egypt
- Language: Arabic

Rags and Tatters (Arabic: فرش وغطا), (translit. farš wa-ġaṭa) is a 2013 Egyptian drama film written and directed by Ahmad Abdalla. It was screened in the Contemporary World Cinema section at the 2013 Toronto International Film Festival. The film was also selected in London Film Festival and Abu Dhabi Film Festival in the official competition. In November 2013, the film won the Grand Prix (The Golden Antigone) at the Montpellier Film Festival.

== Cast ==
- Asser Yassin
- Amr Abed
- Mohamed Mamdouh
- Latifa Fahmy as The Mother
- Yara Goubran
- Atef Yousef

== Reviews ==
The film had positive reviews in international press such as Variety, The Guardian and Huffington Post.
