= Daniel Barnz =

American screenwriter and director

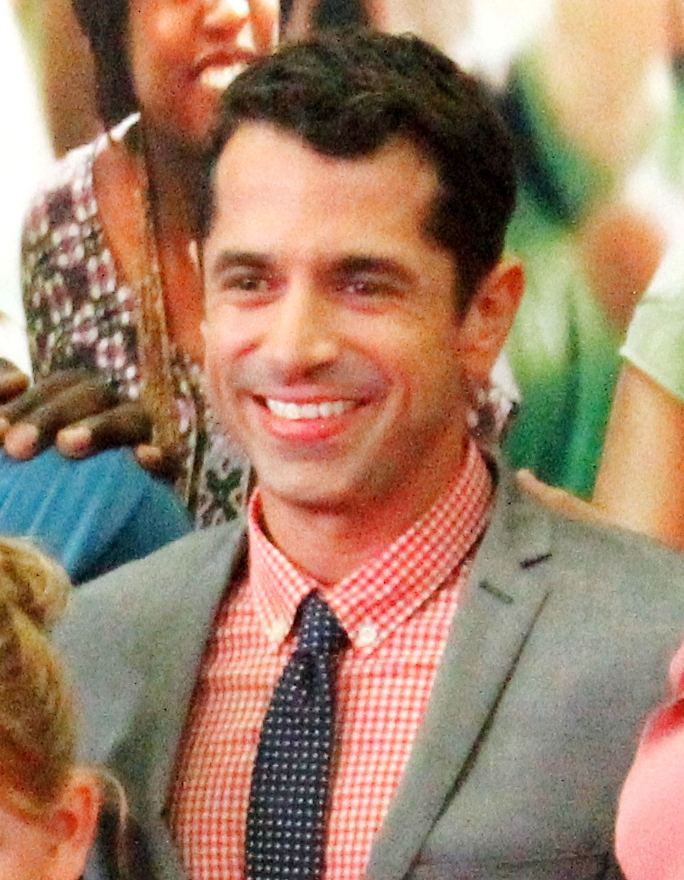
- Barnz at the New York premiere of Won't Back Down, September 2012
- Born: 1970 (age 55–56); Gladwyne, Pennsylvania
- Occupations: Screenwriter, film director
- Years active: 2008–present
- Children: 2

Daniel Barnz (born 1970) is an American screenwriter and director.

== Life and career ==
Barnz was born Daniel Bernstein in Gladwyne, Pennsylvania, a suburb of Philadelphia. His parents, Richard J. Bernstein and Carol L. Bernstein, are both professors. He is openly gay and later changed his surname to an amalgamation of Bernstein and Schwartz, the surname of his partner of almost two decades, Ben Schwartz. The couple has two children. Barnz describes himself as "a Jewish liberal Democrat".

Barnz graduated from Yale University and the University of Southern California Film School. He made his directorial debut in the 2001 movie, The Cutting Room. He directed the 2009 movie, Phoebe in Wonderland, which received mixed reviews from critics. He wrote and directed a movie adaption of the novel Beastly, a modern-day take on Beauty and the Beast. The movie was released on 4 March 2011.

His film Won't Back Down (2012) received mixed reviews and garnered controversy; it was attacked by Randi Weingarten, head of the American Federation of Teachers (AFT), the predominant national teachers' union, as having "the most blatant stereotypes and caricatures I have ever seen-even worse than in Waiting for Superman", another film attacked as "anti-teacher union".

In 2014 he directed the film Cake starring Jennifer Aniston, which received mixed reviews. In 2015, the film was honored by the Substance Abuse and Mental Health Services Administration with a Voice Award for its respectful portrayal of mental health.

== Filmography ==
Feature film

Year	Title	Director	Writer
2008	Phoebe in Wonderland	Yes	Yes
2011	Beastly	Yes	Yes
2012	Won't Back Down	Yes	Yes
2014	Cake	Yes	No

Television

Year	Title	Director	Writer	Executive Producer	Creator
2021	Generation	Yes	Yes	Yes	Yes

== Accolades ==
Year	Award	Category	Title	Result
2008	Sundance Film Festival	Grand Jury Prize for Dramatic Direction	Phoebe in Wonderland	Nominated
