= Massive Scar Era =

- Origin: Alexandria, Egypt
- Genres: Alternative metal, folk metal
- Years active: 2004–present
- Website: massivescarera.com

Massive Scar Era is an Egyptian alternative metal collaborative project that was founded by Egyptian songwriter, singer, and guitarist Cherine Amr in 2004 in Alexandria, Egypt. The band's music is characterized by a distinctive fusion of metal, progressive rock, and punk, with elements of traditional Egyptian music. MSE's sound is largely defined by Cherine's vocals, which often incorporate metal growling and incorporating Egyptian scales.

== Career ==
Amr had become interested in Western heavy metal in the late 1990s, when the genre became popular in Egypt even though the police were known to round up fans for harsh questioning. She formed Massive Scar Era with Suzie and Sarah Kasrway. The band's name was also shortened to "Mascara", which reflected its beginnings as an all-female group; it later stopped using the abbreviation. They released their debut EP Reincarnation in 2006. The band immediately gained notice for its female membership, often with criticism from family members and religious authorities; these struggles were mentioned in the internationally released book Heavy Metal Islam by Mark Levine in 2008. The band has also faced difficulty in finding gigs and record distributors in their home region due to popular disdain for aggressive music.

The Reincarnation EP gained international recognition, and the band was invited to play the Sweden Rock Festival in 2009. In 2010 they were featured in the Egyptian film Microphone, covering Alexandria's arts and music scene. Starting in 2011 the band began to play at European summer music festivals regularly. In 2013 Massive Scar Era was featured in the film Before the Spring, After the Fall, which depicted the participation of Egypt's rock musicians in that country's 2011 revolution. Cherine Amr moved to Canada in 2015 to escape her home country's criticism and harassment toward her music. Following her immigration, Cherine Amr's creative vision for Massive Scar Era evolved to become a collaborative project, where she invites a diverse group of musicians to contribute to the band's sound and bring her vision to life. This approach differs from having a fixed band membership, enabling the band to explore and experiment with various musical styles and influences while keeping the core element of the project's identity intact.

=== Assyad (2024) ===
Assyad is a concept record by Massive Scar Era, self-released on 25 October 2024. It draws on Zār, an Egyptian ritual tradition in which music and dance are used to reconcile people with the spirits, known as assyad, believed to cause their illness. Each track is inspired by a particular spirit, and the music combines traditional Zār songs and rhythms with metal and progressive rock.

The album grew out of several years of research into Zār by Cherine Amr. In 2021 she completed a residency in Cairo with Zār musicians, including the Abou El-Gheit Ensemble led by Mohammed Abouzied, with the support of Dr. Kawkab Tawfik. In 2023 she held a residency in Montreal that brought metal and Zār musicians together, followed by a public show at Le Petit Campus on 18 August 2023.

Amr wrote all of the songs and lyrics and performed lead vocals and guitar. Abouzied played percussion and kawala, Salem Atallah sang in the traditional Zār style, Simon McKay played drums and Frédérick Filiatrault played bass. The record was made at Studio Mix Art in Montreal and was mixed and mastered by Etienne Tremblay. The lead single, "School Girls", features death growls by Chaney Crabb of Entheos and pays tribute to a traditional Zār song of the same name. The release was supported by the Canada Council for the Arts.

Coverage described the album as the band's most experimental work and drew a parallel between two communities that have faced social suspicion, heavy metal audiences and followers of Zār.

== Discography ==
EPs

- Reincarnation (2006)
- Unfamiliar Territory (2010)
- Precautionary Measures (2011)
- Comes Around You (2012)
- 30 Years (2016)
- Color Blind (2018)
- Metal Goes Egyptian (2023)

Albums

- ASSYAD (2024)

Videos

- "Ab3ad Makan" – ابعد مكان
- "Pray" (2012)
- "Color Blind" (2018)
- Metal Goes Egyptian: Live with an Egyptian Arabic Orchestra (2023)
