= Sleepless Nights (2003 film) =

2003 Egyptian romantic drama film

- سهر الليالي
- Directed by: Hani Khalifa
- Written by: Tamer Habib
- Produced by: Isaad Younis
- Starring: Sherif Mounir; Fathy Abdel Wahab; Hanan Tork; Ahmed Helmy; Ola Ghanem; Mona Zaki; Gihan Fadel; Khaled Abol Naga
- Cinematography: Ahmed Abdel Aziz
- Edited by: Khaled Marei
- Music by: Hesham Nazih
- Production company: Al Arabia Cinema
- Release date: 2003
- Country: Egypt
- Language: Arabic

Sleepless Nights (Arabic: سهر الليالي, romanized: Sahar El Layaly) is a 2003 Egyptian romantic drama film directed by Hani Khalifa and written by Tamer Habib. The film stars Sherif Mounir, Fathy Abdel Wahab, Hanan Tork, Ahmed Helmy, Ola Ghanem, Mona Zaki, Gihan Fadel, and Khaled Abol Naga.

The film portrays the relationships and personal problems of a group of couples from Cairo. Their differences and marital difficulties come to the surface during a birthday gathering, after which the men decide to leave Cairo for Alexandria.

The film was selected as Egypt's submission for the Academy Award for Best International Feature Film at the 76th Academy Awards, but it did not receive a nomination. It was also recognized at several film festivals and received multiple awards in Egypt.

== Plot ==
The film follows a group of friends and their partners as they deal with problems in their romantic and marital relationships. The story explores issues including infidelity, sexual dissatisfaction, emotional tension, and differences between partners.

The events begin at a birthday gathering attended by the group. During the gathering, disagreements and unresolved problems emerge, exposing tensions within the couples' relationships. The conflicts lead the men to leave Cairo and travel to Alexandria, where they have an opportunity to reconsider their personal lives and relationships.

== Cast ==
- Sherif Mounir as Sameh
- Fathy Abdel Wahab as Khaled
- Hanan Tork as Farah
- Ahmed Helmy as Amr
- Ola Ghanem as Inas
- Mona Zaki as Perry
- Gihan Fadel as Moshira
- Khaled Abu Al-Naga as Ali
- Intisar as Donia
- Ahmed Kamal as Nabil
- Ragaa Al Geddawy as Nawara
- Sami El Adl as Hamed El Mahdi
- Ahmed Abdel Hadi as Farah's father
- Huda El Saifi as Perry's mother
- Magdy Mounir as a gynecologist
- Amr Waked as the voice of Wael
- Engy Ali as the presenter
- Ahmed Haroun as Wael Gouda

== Production ==
Sleepless Nights was directed by Hani Khalifa and written by Tamer Habib. It was Khalifa's first feature-length fiction film. Before making the film, Khalifa had directed short films and documentaries.

The film was produced by Al Arabia Cinema, with Esaad Younis as a producer. Its cinematography was handled by Ahmed Abdel Aziz, editing by Khaled Marei, and music composed by Hesham Nazih.

The film focuses on relationships among young and middle-class Egyptians and addresses subjects such as sexuality, marital dissatisfaction, and infidelity. Its frank treatment of these subjects attracted attention in Egypt at the time of its release.

== Release ==
The film was released in Egypt in 2003. It was also screened at the 2004 Biennale of Arab Cinema in Paris.

== Reception ==
The film attracted attention for its frank portrayal of relationships and sexuality in Egyptian society. A contemporary report by Screen Daily described it as a controversial relationship drama, noting its discussion of subjects that were rarely addressed so openly in Egyptian cinema at the time.

In 2009, Egypt Independent described the film as a breakthrough in contemporary Egyptian cinema and reported that it had achieved commercial success and received awards at film festivals in Damascus and Paris.

== Awards ==
At the 10th Egyptian National Film Festival in 2004, Sleepless Nights won the award for Best Film, as well as awards for Best Director for Hani Khalifa, Best Screenplay for Tamer Habib, and Best Cinematography for Ahmed Abdel Aziz.

The film also received awards at the Damascus Film Festival in 2003 and the Biennale of Arab Cinema in Paris in 2004.

== Academy Award submission ==
In 2003, Egypt selected Sleepless Nights as its submission for the Academy Award for Best Foreign Language Film at the 76th Academy Awards. The selection was made by a committee of Egyptian film industry figures, which considered 22 films and shortlisted two before choosing Sleepless Nights as the country's entry. The film was not among the final nominees.
