= Yara Goubran =

Egyptian actress

- Born: Egypt
- Education: American University of Cairo
- Occupation: Film actress

Yara Goubran (in Arabic يارا جبران), is an Egyptian film and stage actress very famous for her roles in independent Egyptian theatre as well as her lead role in an award-winning film Basra in the role of Nahla.

== Education and Career ==
Goubran graduated from the American University of Cairo where she had studied media and theater. In addition to Basra, she has appeared in the Egyptian film Karim's Harem (Hareem Kareem) and Farsh w ghata and Egyptian television series Lahazaat hariga and Arfat al bahr.

== Filmography ==
- 2005: Malek wa ketaba
- 2005: Karim's Harem
- 2007: Winter's Day Visits (short)
- 2008: The Aquarium as Nihad Aboul Enein
- 2009: Basra as Nahla
- 2010: 678 as Amina
- 2013: Rags & Tatters
- 2019: Between Two Seas
