= Tarek Naga =

Egyptian architect (born 1953)

Tarek Naga (June 24, 1953 – November 23, 2023) was an Egyptian architect.

== Early life ==
Tarek Naga was born in 1953 in Cairo, Egypt. He is the elder brother of Egyptian actor and film maker Khaled Abol Naga. He obtained a Bachelor of Architecture from Ain Shams University in 1975 and a master's from the University of Minnesota in 1982. He was based in America, where he has lived since 1979. He has published works on architecture and has taught in America and been a guest academic at the American University in Cairo. He regularly enters design competitions. He has created installations for exhibitions and has been involved in a variety of ongoing design projects in Egypt and Dubai. He died in November 23, 2023.

== Architecture ==
Initially trained in traditional architectural styles, Naga found these unsatisfactory and wanted to "get out of this box, look for other possibilities -- something much more substantial than just a continuation of the same kind of style, variations and abstractions of certain variations, Eastern or Western, Islamic or not, Mies van der Rohe or whoever was trendiest…"

In Egypt in the mid 1970s, Naga found himself in an environment in a state of flux and his design philosophy was challenged by market forces driven by the need for housing. When the opportunity arose, he applied to go to America with two other academics and after an interview he was accepted. After touring the US and meeting leading architects, visiting universities and architectural firms he was offered a teaching position at the University of Minnesota. He attained his master's degree and moved to the University of Pennsylvania where he remained for three years working on a dissertation for a doctorate. He did not complete the doctorate but valued the process of research and reflection in addition to the opportunity to teach.

He took up a position at the Architects' Collaborative in Boston but found that it resembled the traditionalism he had rejected in Egypt where "tradition was so heavy you could not liberate yourself from it."

Naga formed his own firm in 1991, which is based in Los Angeles. He has exhibited designs internationally in events in France, Japan, and America.

He described Architecture as "a discipline engages a much wider range of topics that concern society in a certain evolutionary process, like philosophy, the arts, the sciences…" His design philosophy incorporates a desire to create "an architecture that would transcend the traditional historical evolution of architectural 'style,' which is becoming, really, increasingly irrelevant."

=== Projects in Egypt ===
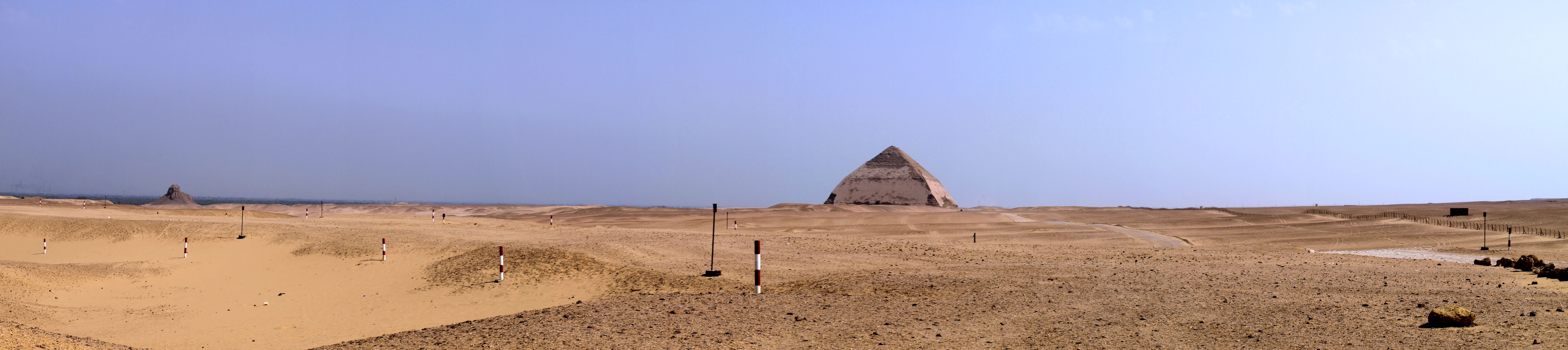
Panoramica Dahshur

In 2010, Naga worked on a joint initiative of a variety of International and Egyptian agencies including "the United Nations Development Programme (UNDP), the World Tourism Organization (WTO), the United Nations Industrial Development Organization (UNIDO), the International Labor Organization (ILO), and the United Nations Educational, Scientific, and Cultural Organization (UNESCO)." at Dahshur, Egypt.

The project aimed to protect and develop the historical Dahshur site while creating a sustainable management plan for the area and employment for the local community. Naga and his team documented historical evidence at the site, and created a database of each monument at the location.

Naga participated in the first TEDxCairo, delivering a presentation entitled: "Of Phantom limbs: Sycamores, Towers, and the Return of the Prodigal Son" at the American University in Cairo.

In 2010, he designed a "Muramid" for the Art Miles Project to commemorate the International Day of Peace. The "Muramid" consisted of a floating pyramid structure. It was designed to float down the Nile whilst displaying digitised murals created by children from all over the world on a variety of themes.

== Exhibitions ==
- 1986 "Drawing Towards Building Exhibit", Academy of Fine Arts, Philadelphia, PA, USA
- 1991 "Doors, Scrolls & Ladders" Art Show, Avenue Gallery, Venice, CA
- 1993 "Domesticating Modernity", UIA Congress, Chicago, Illinois, USA
- 1998 UCLA/AAAI - Art & Aesthetic of Artificial Intelligence Conference, UCLA, CA
- 2000 "Project 2000 Exhibit", Global Architecture, GA Gallery, Tokyo, Japan
- 2000 "Archilab 2000", An International Conference and Exhibit, Orleans, France
- 2000 "Venice Biennale 2000", Egypt Pavilion Exhibit, Venice, Italy
- 2001 "Research Architecture", Pratt Institute/Storefront Gallery, New York, USA
- 2003 "Architectures Expérimentales 1950-2000", Orléans, France
- 2004 "Plastered: Political Prints", Group Exhibit, Block 7 Gallery, Denver, Colorado

== Projects ==
- 1995 Yokohama International Port Terminal Competition, Yokohama, Japan
- 2000 House of Emergent Suspensions, ESK House, Cairo, Egypt
- 2000 Venice Biennale of Architecture 2000, Egypt's Pavilion, Venice, Italy
- 2000 - Current The Giza Pyramids Plateau Master Plan, Giza, Egypt
- 2001 Marina International Hotel, Marina Del Rey, California, USA
- 2001 Science City Competition, Egypt
- 2002 The Grand Egyptian Museum Competition (GEM)
- 2002 Requiem / Multi-Media Installation American University in Cairo, Egypt
- 2003 World Trade Center Memorial Competition
- 2004 - Current City of Phantom Limbs / Docuceptual Film
- 2005 - Current Bus Stops System, New Cairo City, Egypt
- 2006 Hikari Tobari Installation, Tokyo Designers Week, Tokyo, Japan
- 2006 – Current OQYANA, The World First, development, Dubai, UAE
