= Civic Duty (film) =

2006 film directed by Jeff Renfroe

- Theatrical release poster
- Directed by: Jeff Renfroe
- Written by: Andrew Joiner
- Produced by: Andrew Lanter
- Starring: Peter Krause; Khaled Abol Naga; Richard Schiff; Kari Matchett; Ian Tracey
- Cinematography: Dylan Macleod
- Edited by: Erik Hammarberg; Jeff Renfroe
- Music by: Terry Huud; Eli Krantzberg
- Distributed by: Freestyle Releasing
- Release dates: April 26, 2006 (Tribeca Film Festival); May 4, 2007
- Running time: 98 minutes
- Countries: Canada; United Kingdom; United States
- Language: English

Civic Duty is a 2006 thriller film directed by Jeff Renfroe and starring Peter Krause, Khaled Abol Naga, Kari Matchett, and Richard Schiff.

== Plot ==
The film is about an American accountant bombarded with cable news and the media's obsession with terrorist plots in the post 9/11 world, who receives a jolt when an unattached Islamic graduate student moves in next door.

== Cast ==
- Peter Krause as Terry Allen
- Khaled Abol Naga as Gabe Hassan
- Richard Schiff as FBI Agent Tom Hilary
- Kari Matchett as Marla Allen
- Ian Tracey as Lieutenant Randall Lloyd
- Vanesa Tomasino as Bank Teller
- Laurie Murdoch as Loan Officer
- Michael Roberds as Post Office Clerk
- Agam Darshi as Nurse
- Mark Brandon as Night Anchor Bret Anderson
- Brenda Crichlow as Day Anchor Tricia Wise
- Val Cole as Morning Anchor Susan Harwood
- Mark Docherty as News Reporter Chad Winslow
- Michael St. John Smith as Legal Analyst
- P. Lynn Johnson as Governor Bradley

== Critical reception ==
On the review aggregator website Rotten Tomatoes, 56% of 57 critics' reviews are positive. The website's consensus reads: "At times a tense and provocative thriller, Civic Duty struggles to move beyond its one-note premise."

Richard Nilsen, film critic for The Arizona Republic, liked the film at times, but gave the film a mixed review. He wrote, "It does build up considerable suspense and tension; Renfroe has learned well from Hitchcock. And the final confrontation builds to a harrowing pitch. But that can't rescue the film from a silly, melodramatic finish."

Gabe Hassan (played by actor Khaled Abol Naga, who is a star in his native Egypt, perhaps the most handsome would-be modern day terrorist ever) gives an inspired performance as the terrorist / grad student who challenges the lunatic (Peter Krause) that has him captive and effectively glides over a range of emotions
