= Beastly =

2007 novel by Alex Flinn

- Author: Alex Flinn
- Language: English
- Genre: Fantasy novel
- Publisher: HarperTeen
- Publication date: October 2, 2007
- Publication place: United States
- Pages: 320
- ISBN: 1-4178-2861-7

Beastly is a 2007 novel by Alex Flinn. It is a retelling of the fairytale Beauty and the Beast set in modern-day New York City from the view of the beast. Flinn researched many versions of the Beauty and the Beast story to write her book. Many of these are playfully alluded to in portions of the book, particularly the chat room transcripts in which the character of Kyle talks to other teens who have been transformed into creatures.

== Plot ==
Kyle Kingsbury is a handsome, wealthy, popular high school student with a selfish, shallow personality. After he plays a cruel practical joke on Kendra, an outcast girl in his class who is secretly a witch in disguise, she places a curse on him and turns him into a beast. Shortly before his transformation, Kyle gave an unwanted rose corsage to a girl working a ticket booth; seeing this small act of kindness from him, Kendra promises that if in two years, he falls in love and gets the object of his affection to love him in return, the spell will be broken, otherwise he will remain a beast forever.

Kendra later offers Kyle further aid by giving him a magic mirror that shows him whomever he wishes to see. He is locked in a mansion-like apartment by his equally shallow, image-obsessed father. His only company is his housekeeper, Magda, and, at his request, a blind tutor named Will. Kyle finds solace in a greenhouse for roses that he tends himself. After a year of being in this state, and trying and failing to find love, Kyle changes his name to Adrian, meaning "Dark One", to reflect his feelings of being a completely different person from the conceited, materialistic boy he used to be. When a robber stumbles into his garden Adrian offers him a deal; he will not report the robber to the police if the robber brings Adrian his daughter, Linda. She is Adrian's last chance to break the spell before his two years are up.

Adrian realizes that Linda is the same girl to whom he gave the rose corsage. He fixes up a room for her, leaving roses and books for her to amuse herself with. When she arrives, she at first wants nothing to do with him as she feels he kidnapped her. As time passes, she slowly warms up to him and he finds himself falling in love with her. The two begin to have tutoring sessions together and, during winter, they go to a lodge. Shortly before the last year is up, Linda wishes to see her father once more. Adrian lets her see him with the magic mirror and she finds that he has become sick through drug use. Adrian quickly lets her go to him and offers for her to return to the apartment in the spring if she desires, this time as a friend and not a prisoner.

On the last day of the second year, Adrian looks for Linda in the mirror and sees her being dragged into a building by a man. He rushes to her rescue and is shot in the process. As he lies dying, he asks Linda for a kiss. She kisses him, breaking the spell and turns him back to normal. He explains everything to Linda and the two go back and live in the apartment together. Adrian had also made a deal with Kendra, because of which, Will regains his sight and Magda is allowed to return to her family. Kendra reveals that she was Magda, punished to remain a servant forever because of her careless spell but she can now return home as well.

== Characters ==
- Kyle Kingsbury (a.k.a."Adrian") is the son of Manhattan's news anchor, Rob Kingsbury. He is tall, blonde, rich, and handsome. He is the most popular guy in school and dates the hottest girls; however, starts the book as a shallow and lonely bully, feeling abandoned by his father and regularly dishing out cruelty to people less well off than himself. When Kyle asks an unappealing new student, Kendra, to the upcoming dance as a practical joke, Kendra, who is revealed to be a beautiful witch, transforms Kyle into an ugly beast with fangs, claws, and fur. Kyle's father is ashamed of his son's appearance and locks him in a large apartment in downtown New York so no one will see him. Kyle's only company is his housekeeper, and, later, a blind tutor named Will and his dog, Pilot. He changes his name from Kyle (which means "handsome") to Adrian (which means "dark one") and over the course of the two years becomes a completely different person (becoming much more kind and sensitive). His only happiness comes from the rose garden he plants and maintains in his small backyard, encouraged by Will. Adrian has two years to break the witch's spell by falling in love and being loved sincerely despite physical appearances.
- Linda "Lindy" Owens is the modern version of "Beauty". She is described as not the most beautiful girl with red hair, green eyes, and crooked teeth. (However, paralleling the original tale, her name means "pretty.") She often talks about how she 'dug a tunnel' out of her life and applied for Kyle's school, Tuttle, the most expensive private school in the city. Kyle, when he first saw her, called her a total zero. When he gets the mirror, he keeps watching her, and slowly falls in love with her. Lindy comes into Kyle's/Adrian's life again when her drug-addicted father offers Lindy to Kyle so that Kyle wouldn't contact the police about his crimes, and, at first, Lindy resents Kyle for taking her from her father. After a few days, she comes out and tutors with Will and Adrian (Kyle's alias). She loves the roses in the greenhouse. She misses her father. But when she goes back, she is sold again for money and drugs. When they both go back to school, she and Kyle are dating, to the confusion and disapproval of the other students. Lindy is described as very smart and tolerant of her father's drug-filled life.
- Kendra Hilferty is a Witch who had used her powers too frequently in her youth and, as punishment, is sent by the witch elders to New York City to work as a servant. She disguises herself as a new student at Tuttle to spy on Kyle. She introduces herself as Kendra Hilferty, bearing green hair and dark clothes, and is overweight and ugly. However, before she transforms Kyle, her "ugliness" disappears and she is described as a beautiful witch. She also is disguised as Magda, the Kingsbury's maid, to serve and, at the same time, spy on Kyle during his two years as a beast. At the end, Kyle finds out everything about the witch, but lets her go as a part of the deal they made earlier, so Kendra returns to her fellow witches.
- Will Fratalli is in his late twenties, tall and slender with curly hair. Will is also a kind person who has a love of literature and had Kyle read books such as The Hunchback of Notre-Dame and The Phantom of the Opera. He is hired to tutor Kyle after Kyle's transformation. He is blind, and has a dog, Pilot, who serves as a helper and a watchdog. At first, Pilot feels uncomfortable around Kyle. But as the time passes, he starts to become fond of him. In the end, Kendra restores Will's eyesight as a part of her deal with Kyle, and he becomes an English teacher at Tuttle while studying to become a professor.
- Rob Kingsbury is Manhattan's most popular news anchor. He has a son, Kyle, who he neglects. He is rich and handsome and lives in a large apartment with his son and the maid, Magda. Mr. Kingsbury works 24/7 and barely spends time with his son. When he finds out about Kyle's transformation, he locks him up in a luxurious five-floor apartment because he is embarrassed by him and doesn't want anyone to know that his son is a monster. Rob also had an unnamed wife who left him years ago for unknown reasons, and now lives in Miami married to a plastic surgeon. Overall, Rob is a shallow and unsympathetic man who cares more for his image than he does for his own son.
- Mr. Anderson and the Support Group Members are members of a special online support group for people who have gone through transformations. Mr. (Chris) Anderson is the 1800s fairy tale author, Hans Christian Andersen, who wrote stories like Thumbelina and The Little Match Girl. Froggie is the frog prince. Grizzlyguy is the prince from Snow-White and Rose-Red. Silentmaid is Hans Christian Andersen's Little Mermaid. Kyle/Adrian uses the screen name BeastNYC on it.
- Daniel Owens is Linda's sickly and drug addicted father. Linda is sympathetic toward him, despite the fact he was willing to give her up to avoid legal persecution for breaking into Kyle's greenhouse and has hit her more than a few times. It is mentioned that Daniel did try to clean up his act, quit drugs, and get a job, but it only lasted for about a week before he went back to his own ways.

== Awards and recognition ==
- ALA Quick Pick for Reluctant Young Adult Readers
- VOYA Editor’s Choice
- IRA/CBC Young Adults’ Choice
- New York Public Library Books for the Teen Age
- Texas Lone Star Reading List
- Detroit Public Library Author Day Award
- Utah Beehive Award Master List
- Missouri Gateway Award Master List
- Volunteer State Book Award Master List
- Nevada Young Readers Award Master List
- South Dakota Young Adult Book Award Master List
- New Hampshire Isinglass Award Master List
- Woozles (Canada) Teen Battle of the Books list

== Critical reception ==
Beastly had received favorable reviews, one of which from BookLoons, which states that "An interesting twist on this contemporary version of Beauty and the Beast is that the story is told from the beast's point of view. Despite the fact that everyone knows the plot, Flinn's version is well worth reading." Publishers Weekly writes that "[T]he happily-ever-after ending is rewarding, if not surprising." Donna Rosenblum of School Library Journal commented positively on Flinn: "The story is well written and grips readers right from the beginning with an online chat session with Kyle/Beast and other fairy-tale characters. And, since it's told from the Beast's point of view, it will appeal to boys who otherwise might not pick it up." With Beastly, Flinn received positive remarks from reviews. Sonderbooks praised Flinn, saying, "I love the way Alex Flinn worked in all the elements of the traditional tale. I also loved the believable way she showed us Kyle changing, transforming. And of course there's the wonderful blooming of true love. All this adds up to a truly delightful book that I hope will become wildly popular with teens. And any adults who will admit to enjoying Twilight, let me urge you to give Beastly a try." Romantic Times writes that "Flinn does another solid job of giving a fresh perspective to what could have been a preachy story. She keeps the drama and intrigue high and constantly challenges the reader in this twist on Beauty and the Beast"

== Film adaptation ==
Vanessa Hudgens and Alex Pettyfer played Lindy and Kyle, respectively, and Mary-Kate Olsen portrayed Kendra. CBS Films bought the feature rights to Beastly. This was the first project to be developed by the new film arm of CBS Corporation, with the option of the Harper Teen book announced in December 2007. Amy Baer, president and chief executive officer of CBS Films, announced that Daniel Barnz would be directing the movie project. "Daniel's fresh vision makes him one of the most exciting directors of his generation," Baer stated. "We are thrilled to partner with him as he brings his unique voice to arguably the most universally resonant myth in storytelling." Susan Cartsonis produced the film through her company, Storefront Films, while Roz Weisberg co-produced. Barnz also wrote the screenplay for the film. Although it was the first project picked up by CBS Films it did not end up being their first release (which was the January 2010 release Extraordinary Measures), it was to be originally released on July 30, 2010. However it was postponed until March 4, 2011 due to competitive concerns from other films released on that date and late summer 2010 in general. Neil Patrick Harris played the blind tutor called Will. The movie was critically panned, but it catapulted Flinn's novel to the New York Times Bestseller list (#1) and USA Today Bestseller list, where it remained for several months.
