= Susan Cartsonis =

American film producer

- Education: University of California, Los Angeles (BA); New York University (MFA)

Susan Cartsonis is an American film producer and the president of Storefront Pictures. She produced Firelight, Where the Heart Is, What Women Want, Aquamarine, Beastly, and Carrie Pilby, and was the executive producer of The Mistress of Spices and No Reservations. In 2000, she was named one of the top five grossing producers of the year by The Hollywood Reporter. She is President of Wind Dancer Films. She is also Senior Vice President at 20th Century Fox.

Susan is a faculty member within the Maslow Family Graduate Creative Writing program at Wilkes University in Wilkes-Barre, PA.

== Education ==
She received her MFA in dramatic writing from NYU (1984) and a bachelor of arts in theatre from UCLA.

== Filmography ==
She was a producer in all films unless otherwise noted.

=== Film ===
Year	Film	Credit
1997	Firelight	Co-executive producer
2000	Where the Heart Is	
2000	Company Man	Co-executive producer
2000	What Women Want	
2005	The Mistress of Spices	Executive producer
2006	Aquamarine	
2007	No Reservations	Executive producer
2011	Beastly	
2015	The DUFF	
2016	Carrie Pilby	
2016	Middle School: The Worst Years of My Life	Executive producer
2017	Deidra & Laney Rob a Train	
2020	Feel the Beat	
2022	Dear Zoe	Executive producer
2022	Space Oddity	Executive producer
2023	True Spirit	
2023	Sitting in Bars with Cake	
2024	Audrey's Children	Executive producer
TBA	Cowgirl's Last Ride	
TBA	Salvation Creek	Executive producer

Year	Film	Role
2018	Just Between Us	Special thanks
2018	Rajma Chawal	The producers and director wish to thank
2020	Residue	Very heartfelt thanks
2020	A Babysitter's Guide to Monster Hunting	Special thanks

=== Television ===
Year	Title	Credit	Notes
2015	Invisible Sister	Executive producer	Television film
2018	Freaky Friday	Executive producer	Television film
2019	Descendants 3	Executive producer	Television film
2020	Upside-Down Magic	Executive producer	Television film
