= Ahmad Abdalla =

Egyptian film director

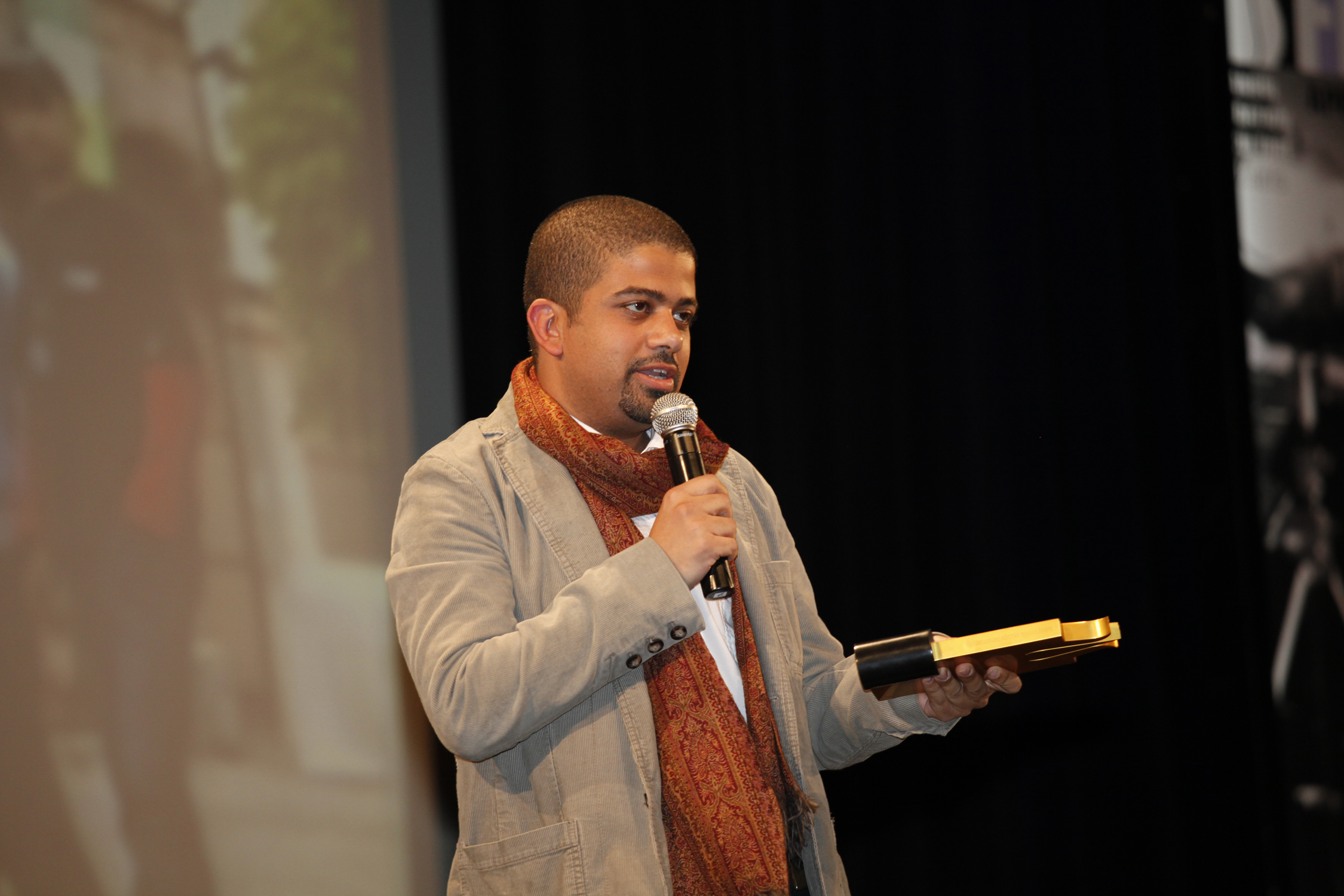
- Born: Ahmad Abdalla El Sayed; December 19, 1979 (age 46); Cairo, Egypt
- Other names: Ahmed Abdallah
- Occupations: Film Director, Script Writer, Film Editor
- Years active: 2009–present
- Notable work: Heliopolis, Microphone, Rags and Tatters
- Website: www.ahmadabdalla.net

Ahmad Abdalla El Sayed Abdelkader (Arabic: أحمد عبد الله السيد) (born on December 19, 1979, Cairo) is an Egyptian film director, editor and screenwriter.

His debut feature film is Heliopolis (2009); his second film is Microphone (2010). He studied music in the 1990s and began working as a film editor in 1999. He moved to feature-length films in 2002 and began doubling as a visual effects supervisor and credits designer.

He was winner of the Best First screenplay Award of Sawiris Foundation in Cairo 2008 for Heliopolis. His upcoming film Rags and Tatters has been selected to be screened in the Contemporary World Cinema section at the 2013 Toronto International Film Festival.

Participated as a jury member in some film festivals like London Film Festival in the 2014 Edition and Carthage film festival and others. Had his first retrospective in Singapore international film festival in 2014.

== Festivals and awards ==
=== Decor - 2014 ===
Producer by New Century in Cairo, the first high-budget film for him, Starring Khaled Abul Naga, Maged el-Kedwany and Horeya Farghaly, The film was premiered in London International Film Festival BFI, and announced for the Middle East Premier in Cairo International Film Festival.

=== Handstand: Breaking Boundaries - 2014 ===
Produced by Red Bull in Cairo, the first Documentary film for B-Boys in Egypt, Starring Charley Breaka and Klash, The film was premiered in Zawya Cinema in downtown Cairo, and caused a buzz in the Breaking scene worldwide.

=== Rags and Tatters - 2013 ===
Rags and Tatters premiered at Toronto international Film Festival 2013, then participated in the official competition in London International Film Festival and was the finest Arabic film in the competition, and screened at many other festivals like Abu Dhabi Film Festival and the Cinemed International Mediterranean Film Festival of Montpellier. The film had positive reviews in international press such as Variety, The Guardian, and Huffington Post.

=== Microphone - 2010 ===
- World Premier: Toronto international Film Festival 2010
- Won— Golden Tulip from Istanbul International Film Festival - 2011
- Won— Best Film – El Festival de Cine Africano de Tarifa 2011
- Won— Tanit d'or from Journées cinématographiques de Carthage
- Won— Best Editing Award from Dubai International Film Festival
- Won— Best Film- le 9e FESTIVAL des CINÉMAS d'AFRIQUE du PAYS d'Apt, Vaucluse – 2011
- Won— Best Arabic-language film Award from Cairo International Film Festival

=== Heliopolis - 2009 ===
- World Premier: Toronto international Film Festival 2009.
- won the Special mention award at Cairo International Film Festival in 2009
- The Original script won the best first screenplay award of Sawiris Foundation in December 2007.
