= Heliopolis (2009 film) =

2009 film

- Directed by: Ahmad Abdalla
- Written by: Ahmad Abdalla
- Produced by: Sherif Mandour
- Starring: Khaled Abol Naga; Hany Adel; Yosra El Lozy; Hanan Motwea; Hend Sabry; Christine Solomon
- Cinematography: Mahmoud Lotfy
- Edited by: Ahmad Abdalla
- Music by: Amir Khalaf
- Production company: Film House egypt
- Release date: October 3, 2009 (Vancouver)
- Running time: 98 minutes
- Country: Egypt
- Language: Arabic

Heliopolis (Arabic: هليوبوليس) is a 2009 Egyptian independent musical documentary film by Ahmad Abdalla that tells the story of a group of young people during a winter day in the Cairo suburb of Heliopolis. Heliopolis is Ahmad Abdalla's debut feature film and starring Khaled Abol Naga. The film was Abdalla's debut feature.

== Synopsis ==
The events of one day in the lives of a number of Cairo residents is a portrayal of unfulfilled dreams and frustrating details of life in the overpopulated Metropolis. Their paths cross and their stories overlap but they are caught up in their struggle and are oblivious to one another against the background of what used to be one of Cairo's most glamorous neighborhoods. The city's vanishing glory and fading history is documented through the characters strife to make it through one day in Heliopolis.... The one thing they all have in common is that they will almost certainly have to meet the City again and again in the coming days. Most of the stories taking a place in the suburb of Heliopolis.

== Cast ==
- Khaled Abol Naga (Ibrahim)
- Hanan Motwea (Engy)
- Christine Solomon (Gothic Girl)
- Hany Adel (Dr. Hany)
- Yosra El Lozy (Sara)
- Mohammed Brekaa (The Soldier)
- Somaya Gouini (Reem)
- Atef yousef (Ali)
- Aya Soliman (Maha)
- Ayda Abdel Aziz (Vera)
- Tamer El-Said (Nagy)
- Hend Sabry (Nagla)
- Mahmoud El-Lozy (Photographer)

== Festivals and awards ==
The film was officially selected by the Toronto International Film Festival in the Discovery section and later at the Vancouver International Film Festival. And it had its Arabic regional premiere in the Middle East International Film Festival.

The European premiere is in the official competition at the 50th edition of Thessaloniki Film Festival in Greece.

Additional festivals:

- Official competition at the 9th edition of International Film Festival of Marrakech in Morocco
- Official competition at the 26th edition of Festival International du Film d'Amour de Mons in Brussels
- The Original script won the best first screenplay award of Sawiris Foundation in December 2007
- Official competition at 15th international film festival Kerala (on 10 to 17 December)
