= Alex Flinn =

American writer of novels for young adults

- Born: October 23, 1966 (age 60); Glen Cove, New York, U.S.
- Education: University of Miami
- Occupation: Novelist
- Spouse: Eugene Flinn
- Children: Katherine Flinn; Meredith Flinn
- Writing career
- Period: 2001–present
- Genres: Fantasy, Romance, Fiction
- Notable work: Beastly (2007)

Alexandra Flinn (born October 23, 1966) is an American writer of novels for young adults. Her books have appeared on the New York Times and USA Today Bestseller lists and have been translated into over twenty foreign languages. Many of her novels are modernized versions of classic fairy tales.

== Biography ==
Flinn was born in Glen Cove, New York, on Long Island, and grew up in Syosset, New York and Miami, Florida. At the age of five, she started thinking about being a writer and submitted early efforts to magazines like Highlights, which did not publish them. At twelve, she moved to Palmetto Bay, Florida, a suburb of Miami, where she still lives. She struggled to make friends at her new school, and she has said that this experience inspired much of her writing for young adults, particularly her book, Breaking Point.

She graduated from Miami-Palmetto High School and was in a performing arts program called PAVAC (Performing And Visual Arts Center), which inspired some of her book, Diva. She graduated from the University of Miami with a degree in vocal performance (opera), then went to law school at Nova Southeastern University. She practiced law for 10 years before quitting her day job to devote herself full-time to writing, following the acceptance of her third book.

== Awards and honors ==
The of Flinn's books are Junior Library Guild selections: A Kiss in Time (2009), Cloaked (2011), and Bewitching (2012). The American Library Association included Breathing Underwater (2002) and Nothing to Lose (2005) on their annual lists of the Best Fiction for Young Adults. They also included Breathing Underwater (2002), Breaking Point (2003), Nothing to Lose (2005), and Beastly (2008) on their annual lists of Quick Picks for Reluctant Young Adult Readers. For the 2003–2004 school year, Breathing Underwater won the Maryland Black-Eyed Susan Award for High School. Booklist included Nothing to Lose on their 2004 list of the top ten crime novels for youth. In 2007, Beastly won the Detroit Public Library's Author Day Award. After being adapted into a 2011 film, it became a New York Times Best Seller.

== Books ==
- Breathing Underwater (2001)
- Breaking Point (2002)
- Nothing to Lose (2004)
- Fade to Black (2005)
- Diva (2006), a sequel to Breathing Underwater
- A Kiss in Time (2009), a modern version of Sleeping Beauty
- Cloaked (2011), based upon several fairy tales, including The Frog Prince, The Shoemaker and the Elves, and The Six Swans
- Towering (2013), a retelling of Rapunzel
- Girls of July (2019)

=== Kendra Chronicles series ===
- Beastly (2007),
- Beastly: Lindy's Diary (2012), an original e-book and also published as part of a special edition of Beastly
- Bewitching (2012), a retelling of Cinderella, with mini-stories about Hansel and Gretel, The Princess and the Pea, and The Little Mermaid
- Mirrored (2015), a retelling of Snow White
- Beheld (2017), based upon several fairy tales, including Little Red Riding Hood, Rumpelstiltskin, East of the Sun and West of the Moon, and The Ugly Duckling
