= Phoebe in Wonderland =

- Theatrical release poster
- Directed by: Daniel Barnz
- Written by: Daniel Barnz
- Produced by: Ben Barnz; Lynette Howell
- Starring: Elle Fanning; Felicity Huffman; Patricia Clarkson; Bill Pullman; Campbell Scott; Peter Gerety; Bailee Madison
- Cinematography: Bobby Bukowski
- Edited by: Robert Hoffman
- Music by: Christophe Beck
- Production company: Silverwood Films
- Distributed by: THINKFilm
- Release dates: January 20, 2008 (Sundance); March 6, 2009 (United States)
- Running time: 96 minutes
- Country: United States
- Language: English

Phoebe in Wonderland is a 2008 American drama film written and directed by Daniel Barnz. It stars Felicity Huffman, Patricia Clarkson, Elle Fanning (in her first leading role), Campbell Scott, and Bill Pullman.

It was screened in the Dramatic Competition at the Sundance Film Festival and the RiverRun International Film Festival in 2008. The film received a limited theatrical release on March 6, 2009, it received mixed reviews by the critics.

== Plot ==
Nine-year-old Phoebe Lichten has Tourette syndrome and obsessive–compulsive disorder. She thrives with her family at home, but struggles in school. Her mother, Hillary, and father, Peter, misinterpret Phoebe and her younger sister, Olivia, as child prodigies; Phoebe's mother, an author, pretentiously remarks that her daughters' poetry is reminiscent of E. E. Cummings. Phoebe tries to fit in with the other kids at school, befriending an effeminate boy named Jamie who is frequently bullied, but teasing on the playground leads to an incident where Phoebe spits at another student's face.

Phoebe's parents dismiss the spitting incident after they are called into the principal's office. They take Phoebe and Olivia to watch a live performance of the ballet Swan Lake, where Phoebe becomes entranced by the fashion and music. She also takes an interest in her school's eccentric drama teacher, Miss Dodger, whom the other teachers regard with disdain. Phoebe seeks a role in Miss Dodger's school play, Alice In Wonderland. Miss Dodger initially dismisses her for her lateness but becomes more accepting after learning that Phoebe has compulsive hand-washing rituals. Phoebe flourishes on stage, but her impulsive speech and behaviour persist off-stage. Convinced that she will be "fired" if she does not get her patterns and lines exactly right, Phoebe spends hours at home jumping off the stairs until she bruises her ankles while using her afternoons to step on every cobblestone in her household garden in the right order. Olivia tries to copy Phoebe's meticulous patterns.

As she becomes more invested in the play, Phoebe begins to envision imaginary friends, particularly Alice herself. Her parents hire a therapist for her, but after he proposes medication, Hillary fires him. When the principal questions if Phoebe behaves oddly outside of the classroom, Hillary denies it even though she has witnessed her daughter's self-destructive rituals at home several times. Phoebe becomes an increasing embarrassment to Olivia, particularly after calling an obese woman a "fat pig" while trick-or-treating on Halloween. Her dreams are shattered when Phoebe is pulled out of the play due to her classroom behaviour. Hillary, desperate to help her daughter feel normal, works with Miss Dodger to bring Phoebe back on stage.

Phoebe is falsely accused by bullies of murdering the class pet, "Carlita", a gerbil, and she spits at them. Meanwhile, Jamie, who won the female part of the Red Queen, has his costume vandalized with a homophobic slur spray-painted on it ("fagot" [sic]), and Phoebe holds his hand in a supportive gesture. Hillary meets Miss Dodger for the first time and is stunned when the teacher claims that Phoebe exhibits no inappropriate behaviors or patterns during the play rehearsals. At the same time, she feels envious that Phoebe gets along better with a teacher than with her own mother. Seeming to reconcile with Olivia at home, both daughters cheerfully run around the house and play together, failing to notice how stressed Peter is by Phoebe's latent mental problems. The girls repeatedly shout that they "want babies!" (a new younger sibling to play with), and Peter quips that their mother couldn't handle another child if it turned out like Phoebe, hurting Phoebe's feelings.

Although Phoebe is put back into the play, her challenges continue as she is driven to behaviour she doesn't understand. She talks with Miss Dodger about her behaviour, and Miss Dodger suggests that as she grows older, she'll one day learn to admire herself for who she is rather than who the world wants her to be. After seeing her imaginary friend Alice again, Phoebe breaks her wrist jumping off the catwalk onto the stage, and Miss Dodger is fired when the principal suspects that she may have prompted Phoebe's act. Feeling betrayed by Miss Dodger's absence, Phoebe's fellow actors descend into chaos, smashing the sets they built, but Phoebe alone clings to a sense of purpose. She urges her classmates to continue their rehearsals on their own. Hillary, who has resisted efforts to label Phoebe, reveals to Phoebe that she has Tourette syndrome, and Phoebe helps her classmates understand Hillary by explaining her condition to them.

== Cast ==
- Elle Fanning as Phoebe Lichten
- Felicity Huffman as Hillary Lichten/Red Queen (uncredited)
- Patricia Clarkson as Miss Dodger
- Bill Pullman as Peter Lichten/Queen of Hearts (uncredited)
- Bailee Madison as Olivia Lichten
- Campbell Scott as Principal Davis/Mad Hatter (uncredited)
- Ian Colletti as Jamie Madison
- Tessa Albertson as Alice
- Peter Gerety as Dr Miles/Humpty Dumpty (uncredited)
- Madhur Jaffrey as Miss Reiter/Knave of Hearts (uncredited)
- Caitlin Sanchez as Monica
- Gracie Bea Lawrence as Julie
- Maddie Corman as Teacher/White Rabbit (uncredited)
- Max Baker as Teacher/King of Hearts (uncredited)
- Danielle Kotch as 2 Year Old Phoebe Lichten

== Reception ==
=== Critical response ===
On review aggregator website Rotten Tomatoes, the film holds an approval rating of 61% based on 54 reviews, with an average rating of 6.00/10. The website's critics consensus reads, "Blessed with a good cast, Phoebe's heart is in the right place, but its execution is dicey." Nathan Lee of NPR criticized the character of Phoebe, calling her, "the kind of 9-year-old who scrawls "I've got angst" on a paper airplane and tosses it into her parents' dinner party. She is, in other words, the type of moody little creature who exists exclusively in the precincts of the Oppressively Whimsical Coming of Age Movie." On Metacritic, the film has a weighted average score of 56 out of 100, based on 20 critics, indicating "mixed or average reviews".

== Awards and nominations ==
On January 14, 2010, the film was nominated for Outstanding Film – Wide Release – at the 21st GLAAD Media Awards.

== Home media ==
The DVD home video was released in 2009 by Image Entertainment.
