= Ahmed Rashwan =

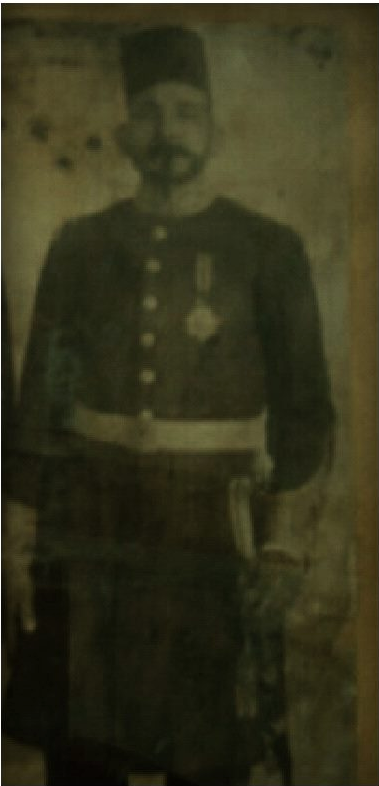
- Ahmed Rashwan (2009)
- Born: October 23, 1969; Alexandria, Egypt
- Occupation: Filmmaker
- Years active: 1990 - present
- Website: http://www.dreamprodeg.com

Ahmed Rashwan (Arabic: احمد رشوان; born 1969) is an Egyptian film director, screenplay writer, and a film producer. His filmography includes a list of short, documentaries, and one long-feature film. Since his graduation from the Cairo Film Institute in 1994, he worked on promoting the Independent Cinema wave in Egypt, as an alternative path to overcome the sway of the mass marketed film production.

== Early life ==
Rashwan was born October 23, 1969, in Alexandria, Egypt to an Egyptian family. His passion for cinema started in childhood, and he began his activities in cinema clubs as a student in high school, and then issued a film magazine with his friends from film enthusiasts in Alexandria. In 1987, he joined the Faculty of Law and graduated in 1990. He then moved to Cairo and studied Cinema in Cairo Film Institute and graduated in 1994. He made a short film called “Zamzam” as his graduation film project.

== Short films ==
Rashwan made 5 short films,

1. “ Habib's Birthday” Short fiction/video/14mins/1 (1993)
2. “ Farah Dreams" short fiction, 20 min, (Beta cam) (1994)
3. “ Zamzam” Short fiction, 35mm/l2mins/1 (1994)
4. “ Cross Roads” (1995)
5. “The Morning After” (2002)
6. Cross Roads Short fiction, 8 min. 1995 35mm
7. Musafa Khana Documentary/l6mm/9 mins/ (1993)
8. Without Make-up (written and directed by Hossam Nour EI-Deen) Short fiction/ 19 min (2003)

== Documentaries ==
Rashwan made 20 documentaries, starting with “ Musafir Khana” (1993). He also worked as a director and executive producer for many documentaries produced by Aljazeera Channel.

== Basra ==
After 5 years of searching about producer, Rashwan decided to filming his first feature film “Basra” (2008) and produced it as well as Egyptian Independent film. Then he met the producer Haitham Hakki who enthused to complete the production of the film, and made the blow up for it from HD format to 35mm format . “ Basra” had a lot of successes in the festivals, screened in 12 festivals and got 6 awards and 1 mention.

== Festivals ==
1. " BASRA" Mostra de Valencia Film Festival - Spain- October 8
2. " BASRA" São Paulo International Film Festival - Brazil - October 8
3. " BASRA" Cairo International Film Festival - Arab Competition - November 8
4. " BASRA" Pan African Film Festival (FESPACO) - Burkina Faso - March 9
5. " BASRA" Cape winlands International Film Festival-South Africa-March 9
6. " BASRA" Sousse International Film Festival - Tunisia - March 9
7. " BASRA" 15th National Film Festival - Cairo - Egypt - April 9
8. " BASRA" Arab Film Festival- Rotterdam - Holland - June 9
9. " BASRA" Beirut International Film Festival - Lebanon October 9
10. " BASRA" Arab film Festival - San Francisco - USA- October 9
11. " BASRA" Arab Film Festival - Brussels - Belgium - November 9

== Awards ==
- Special jury award for my film "Inside People" From The National Film Festival 1999
- the script of (BASRA) has been awarded a prize at the scriptwriting workshop competition – Alexandria Film Festival 2003
- the script of (BASRA)also has been awarded a grant from Global Film Initiative- USA. 2007
- " BASRA" awarded best cinematography ( Victor Credi) : Mostra de Valencia Film Festival – Spain- October 2008
- " BASRA" awarded Best Screenplay, Arab Competition, Cairo International Film Festival ( Shared with Palestinian film "Laila's Birthday") November 2008
- " BASRA" awarded Best Director (for first Film) in 15th National Film Festival – Cairo - Egypt – April 2009
- " BASRA" awarded 3rd production award in 15th National Film Festival – Cairo - Egypt – April 2009
- " BASRA" awarded Best Actor ( Basem Samra) - Arab Film Festival- Rotterdam – June 9
- " BASRA" awarded Special mention – supporting actress ( Fatma Adel ) - Arab Film Festival- Rotterdam – June 9
- " BASRA" awarded Jury award for Best long film – Arab Film Festival – Brussels – November 2009
