= Alexandria Mediterranean Film Festival =

Annual film festival held in Alexandria, Egypt

Alexandria International Film Festival
- Location: Alexandria, Egypt
- Established: 1979
- Website: www.alexmcff.com

The Alexandria International Film Festival for Mediterranean Countries (AIFF) is a film festival in Alexandria, Egypt. It was established in 1979. The festival is organized by the Egyptian Association of Film Writers and Critics (EAFWC).

The AIFF aims to broaden film culture and strengthen the relationship between filmmakers throughout the world, with special attention given to Mediterranean countries.

The festival usually took place in September but has more recently been held in November.

== See also ==
- List of film festivals
- Egyptian cinema
- Mediterranean culture
