= Black Hand (Egypt) =

Jam'ia al-Yad al-Sawda'
- جمعية اليد السوداء
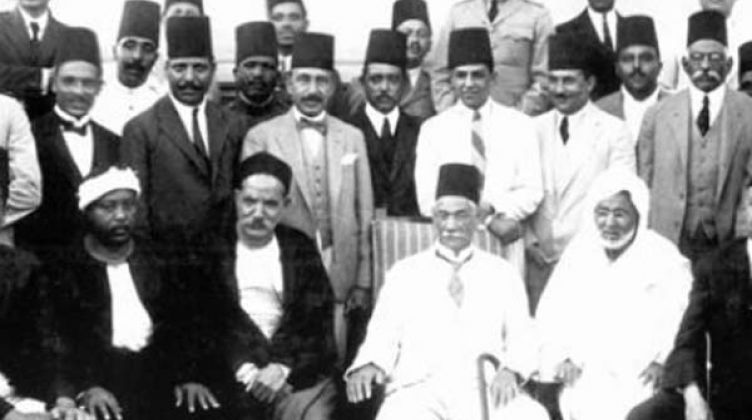
- A photo of Saad Zaghloul with a number of members of the secret association
- Other name: Black Hand
- Leader: Sayyid Pasha
- Founded: 1918
- Active regions: Sultanate of Egypt
- Ideology: Anti-Imperialism; Anti-British sentiment Egyptian nationalism

The Black Hand Association/Society (Egyptian Arabic: جمعية اليد السوداء, romanized: Jam'ia al-Yad al-Sawda') was one of the irregular armed organizations that arose in Egypt in order to resist the British occupation. It was founded out of the secret apparatus of the 1919 Egyptian revolution and led by Abdel Rahman Fahmy. It was known as the Assassination Group (جماعة الإغتيالات). One of the first missions of that group was to kill Prime Minister Mahammad Sa'id Pasha, who was a danger to them at that time.

The period of the 1919 revolution witnessed a state of national movement in Egypt, where the "Black Hand" and "Blue Shirts" movements, which were affiliated with the Wafd Party, and the "Green Shirts" group, which were affiliated with Young Egypt, were founded. The secret group began with the 1919 revolution and took its name from the Black Hand organization, which was launched in Serbia during World War I, was formed and a major committee was formed that included various members, the most important of whom were Ahmad Bey Maher and Abdel Latif al-Soufani, whose mission was to identify figures to be assassinated.

The assassination of Sir Lee Stack was the biggest blow to the group after it was proven that a number of members of the association were involved in the incident. It caused problems for the Wafd government headed by Saad Zaghloul, which was the first national government, and the incident caused its resignation. The Egyptian police then made a number of arrests and many of its members fled. While many of them remained in secret and the organization was not revealed until many years later.

== Establishment ==
Historians have not inferred the time of the founding of the Black Hand Society, as there are no historical documents proving this because it worked in secret. Some sources indicate that the name of the society “Black Hand” was inspired by a secret organization bearing the same name that was founded in 1911 in Serbia by secret officers. Those who killed King Alexander I and his wife in Belgrade in 1903, and it is the same association to which the Bosnian Serb student Gavrilo Princip belonged, whose assassination of Austrian Crown Prince Archduke Franz Ferdinand and his wife during their visit to Sarajevo on June 28, 1914, caused the outbreak of World War I.

This association was headed by lawyer Abdel Halim al-Bili, Abu Shadi Bey, Sheikh Mustafa al-Qayati, Sheikh Mahmoud Abu al-Oyoun, and a number of students. This association sent threatening letters to reactionary politicians, such as Youssef Wahba Pasha, the Prime Minister of Egypt from November 19, 1919, until May 20, 1920, to whom the association sent a threatening letter written in bright red ink bearing the sign of a black hand, a cannon, and the word Fedayeen.

According to the book Heroes of the Secret Service of the 1919 Revolution by the writer Sabri Abu al-Majd, there was a student called Sayyid Pasha who studied at the teachers' school and joined a revolutionary group with his colleagues after the arrest of Saad Zaghloul, and that he was the founder of the Black Hand group. he struck friendships with a number of railway workers in order to gain access to railway workshops and factories to manufacture completely primitive bombs, which could work by placing chemicals that would cause an explosion.

The group was working to supply bombs and weapons for many of the operations of the secret apparatus of the revolution. It was a pistol and then it developed into 4 pistols and 4 bombs, but that was not enough to confront the enormous English development at that time.

Sayyid's mission was not limited to supply, but he was able to manufacture the first weapon in the revolution, to fill the gap of resistance to the British, as he formed a committee accompanied by Ahmad Abdel Hay Kira, and they thought about increasing weapons by chemically manufacturing bombs, so they brought a book in the English language, and they devoted themselves to studying it. They translated it, then brought the materials needed to manufacture the first bomb in the 1919 revolution.

== Activity ==
In historian Ahmad Qasim's writings of Ali al-Haddad, one of the organization's members, he said that he was close to two people, al-Nuqrashi and Ahmad Maher, the latter of whom was an assistant to Abdel Rahman Fahmy, founder and director of the Secret Service, and one of Ahmad Maher's roles was to recruit young men and join the Black Hand, which increased its activity by planning political assassinations following the military court's ruling death sentences imposed on 51 Egyptians in Minya and Asyut, and the sentence was executed for 34 of them, including the Bakbashi Mahammad Kamel, the sheriff who led the Asyut Revolution, in addition to the execution of 3 Egyptians who led the al-Wasti Revolution in Faiyum.

Mustafa Amin said:

"There is nothing in Saad Zaghloul’s correspondence with Abdel Rahman Fahmy that indicates that Saad was the one who instructed these assassinations, but at the same time we do not find in Saad Zaghloul’s secret instructions a single word about that he does not approve of these assassinations. Rather, the wording of the secret letters that Abdel Rahman Fahmy was sending it indicating that he was carrying good news to the leader of the 1919 revolution, and that he was calling the one who tried to assassinate the Prime Minister as having a nationalist spirit."

The Black Hand group was sending threatening letters to politicians whom the revolution considered loyal to the English, and the Black Hand financed its activities by collecting money. The association had an organized system against the British, and members of the Black Hand formed internal committees. The first committee vowed and threatened employees and merchants with death if they did not participate in the strike by closing down their stores.

== Internal organization ==
The Black Hand group had relationships with several committees, namely:

- National Defense Committee: Most of the members of that committee were members of the Black Hand. The purpose of that committee was to incite public opinion against the government, and to incite the people to practice violence against authority.
- Urgent Committee: The purpose of this committee was to arouse public opinion, and it received financial assistance from Abdel Rahman Fahmy Bey. It was headed by Hassan Nafi and Ibrahim Abdel Hadi.
- The Free Egyptian: This association derived its funding from Abdel Rahman Fahmy, and al-Rafi’i mentioned that it published a secret newspaper called al-Masry al-Hur (the free Egyptian) and had its own secret printing press. As the latter mentioned, people were eagerly receiving its bulletins and taking turns to look at them. The English General Belvin issued martial law, which considered this a crime, and any person in possession of a bulletin or some type of such bulletins was also committing a crime against martial law.
- The Flame (al-Shuala): It was headed by Morcos Hanna Bey and Naguib Ghali Pasha.
- Higher schools: Most of its members were students. A paper was seized in which the law of this association was written, which includes a commitment to secret work, and that the members are busy issuing leaflets and urging a strike, and that the association will continue until the last English soldier leaves Egypt. Among its tasks are seeking to discover government secrets and threatening traitors. The Higher Schools Association was writing down a list of the names of English merchants with the intention of boycotting them.
- Revenge Association: This association was formed following the return of the Milner Committee from Egypt on January 17, 1920. It was divided into three sections: The first section was concerned with distributing leaflets. This section wrote letters to Lord Milner, Sir Valentine Chirol, and the ministers, and the leaflets were printed in a printing press. It was called Abi al-Azaim Press; The second section was the Pistols Department, and it had American-made pistols and pistols of a type called “Black Mountain.” As for the third section, it was the bombs section, and it was headed by Hosni al-Shentanawy, along with Helmi al-Jayar and others. The bombs were made in an Izba near Giza.
- Council of Ten Association.
- Association of the fifty.

== Notable members ==
The group became famous for the joining of many well-known figures or who became known later, the most prominent of whom were the group's leader, Abdel Rahman Fahmy, Ahmad Maher, al-Nuqrashi and Ibrahim Abdel Hadi, who later became prime ministers in Egypt. Journalists also joined, including Abbas Mahmoud al-Aqqad. There are also members of the group who achieved a distinguished position. Some of them are famous: Ahmad Abdel Hay Kira, Dawlat Fahmy, and Abdel Qader Shehata, whose names have appeared in books and works of art.

== Sir Lee Stack incident ==
In 1924, the political arena witnessed the peak of tension after the clash between Prime Minister Saad Zaghloul Pasha and King Fuad I was repeated. The Sudanese issue was the background frame for this scene, and the angry masses in Sudan at that time were chanting the unity of Egypt and Sudan, while the English authorities wanted to separate Sudan from Egypt, and for this reason a national movement was formed in Sudan to support Saad Zaghloul's position in confronting the British occupier of Egypt. The movement bore the name "White Brigade" and was led by Sudanese officer Ali Abdel Latif.

Al-Latif al-Muswarah magazine published that the crisis between Saad Zaghloul, who refused to separate Sudan from Egypt on the one hand, and the king and the British occupation on the other side, prompted Saad to submit his resignation to the king on June 29, 1924, but the king rejected it, and Ali Abdel Latif was arrested on charges of conspiring to overthrow the regime. The assassination of Sir Lee Stack was the biggest event that shook the Kingdom of Egypt and the United Kingdom together on November 23, 1924. The momentous incident occurred at two o’clock in the afternoon on Wednesday, November 19, after the Sirdar of the Egyptian Army and the Governor-General of the Anglo-Egyptian Sudan left his office at the Ministry of War, heading to his home in Zamalek. After he finished his work, five people waited for him and threw a bomb near his car and fired 7 bullets, seriously wounding the Sirdar in his abdomen, and seriously wounding the Yawar and the driver Frederick Hamilton March. The Sirdar died in the middle of the night following the accident. The perpetrators had fled and the driver of the car that was waiting for them was arrested.

The newspapers published the details of the incident and the text of Saad Pasha Zaghloul's statement addressed to the nation, in which he described the incident as one of the most severe and heinous atrocities and one of the worst impacts on the country's reputation and fame. The incident put Saad Zaghloul's government in a dilemma and he appealed to the Egyptians that anyone who knows something should submit it to the Public Security Department. The driver of the taxi in which the perpetrators were traveling was arrested, and he stated that they rode as ordinary passengers.

After that, Saad Zaghloul's government resigned, and the new ministry was headed by Ahmad Zeiwar Pasha, in which Ismail Sedqi Pasha held the portfolio of the Ministry of Interior, which announced a reward of 10,000 pounds for guidance of any of the perpetrators. Seven men were arrested, some of whom belonged to the Black Hand Association, and the court sentenced them to death by hanging in 1925. The pistols used were identified through a pioneering instance of bullet examination by forensic scientist Sydney Smith.

== In media ==
- The 2022 movie "Kira & el Gin" directed by Marwan Hamed starring Karim Abdel Aziz, Hend Sabry and Ahmed Ezz follows the story of Ahmed Abdelhai Kiraand Abdelkader El-Ginn two members of the Black Hand and their attacks of the British forces, the movie is based on a novel called "1919" written by Ahmed Mourad
- Journalist Mustafa Amin the great nephew of Saad Zaghloul published in 1963 a book called "the secret of 1919" talking about the activities of the group
- The 1987 movie "Dawlat Fahmy Allati Lam Yaarifha Ahad" starring Sawsan Badr sheds light on the life of Dowlat Fahmy a Coptic teacher who assisted the organisation
