= Mohamed Attia =

Egyptian actor

Mohamed Attia (born September 19, 1973) is an Egyptian production designer and art director who is best known for his collaborations with Marwan Hamed, Yousry Nasrallah, Mohamed Khan, and Tarek Alarian. He is also one of the key artistic directors behind the Pharaohs' Golden Parade and the parade that celebrated the restoration of Luxor's Avenue of Sphinxes.

He received the Egyptian National Film Festival's Best Art Design Award for his work in The Blue Elephant, the Egyptian Catholic Center For Cinema's Best Art Director Award for The Originals, the Cairo Design Award's Golden Award in the Production Design Category for Diamond Dust and Blue Elephant: Dark Whispers, and the Silver Award for his work in Sons of Rizk 2.

== Education and career ==
Attia studied dentistry at Cairo University for five months before deciding it wasn't his passion. He then transferred to the Faculty of Fine Arts in Zamalek, where he interned on the set of Al Mohager (The Emigrant) — a 1994 film directed by Youssef Chahine.

In 1995, he completed his architectural studies and began working as a draftsman in France. After working on drawings for over three years, he jumped at the chance to return to Cairo and help renovate buildings at the 1930s-era production complex Studio Misr. There, he met production designer and art director Salah Marei, who encouraged him to change careers and introduced him to film director Khan.

== Filmography ==
Filmography
Year	Title	Director
2004	Klephty	Mohamed Khan
2007	In the Heliopolis Flat	Mohamed Khan
2009	Scheherazade, Tell Me a Story	Yousry Nasrallah
2012	After the Battle	Yousry Nasrallah
2014	The Blue Elephant	Marwan Hamed
2015	Sons of Rizk	Tarek Alarian
2015	The Walls of the Moon	Yousry Nasrallah
2017	The Originals	Marwan Hamed
2017	The Cell	Tarek Alarian
2018	Diamond Dust	Marwan Hamed
2019	The Blue Elephant 2	Marwan Hamed
2021	The Knower	Ahmad Ala El-Dib

== Telelvision ==
TV
Year	Title	Director
2014	Soula	Tarek Alarian
2016	Afrah Alqoba	Mohamed Yassin
2019	Sahranin	Mohamed Bakir
2021	Abla Fahita: Drama Queen	Khaled Marei
2022	The Eight	Reda Abd Elrazek, Ahmed Medhat

== Awards ==
Awards
Year	Ceremony	Category	Film
2009	Film Society Festival For Egyptian Cinema	Best Set Design Awards	Scheherazade, Tell Me a Story
2012	Film Society Festival For Egyptian Cinema	Best Set Design Awards	After the Battle
2014	Film Society Festival For Egyptian Cinema	Best Set Design Awards	The Blue Elephant
2014	Egyptian National Film Festival	Best Art Design	The Blue Elephant
2015	Film Society Festival For Egyptian Cinema	Best Set Design Awards	The Walls of the Moon
2015	Film Society Festival For Egyptian Cinema	Best Set Design Awards	Sons of Rizk
2016	Cairo Design Awards	Silver Award	Afrah Alqoba
2017	Egyptian Catholic Center For Cinema	Best Art Director Award	The Originals
2018	Cairo Design Awards	Golden Award	Diamond Dust
2019	Cairo Design Awards	Golden Award	The Blue Elephant 2
2019	Cairo Design Awards	Silver Award	Sons of Rizk 2
