= Pharaohs' Golden Parade =

2021 transportation of ancient Egyptian mummies in Cairo

The Pharaohs' Golden Parade موكب المومياوات الملكية Ϯϫⲓⲛⲟⲩⲱⲛϩ ⲛ̀ⲛⲓⲫⲁⲣⲁⲱ ⲛ̀ⲛⲟⲩⲃ
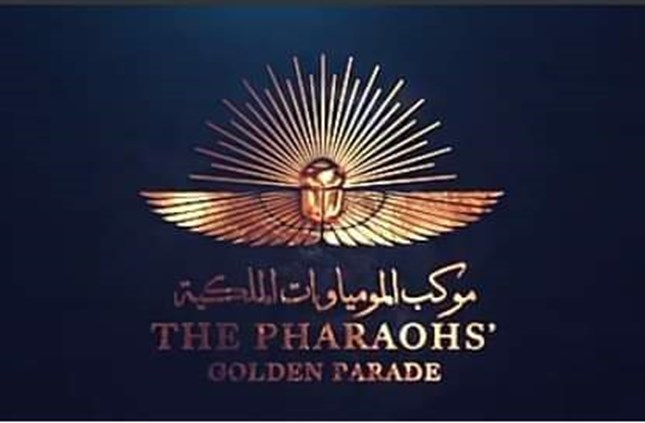
- Official logo of the event
- Date: 3 April 2021; 5 years ago
- Venue: Egyptian Museum in Tahrir Square; National Museum of Egyptian Civilization in Fustat
- Location: Cairo, Egypt; 30°2′40″N 31°14′9″E
- Motive: Transportation of 22 ancient Egyptian mummies of the pharaohs of the New Kingdom
- Organized by: Ministry of Tourism and Antiquities

The Pharaohs' Golden Parade (Note: Arabic: موكب المومياوات الملكية; Egyptian Arabic: موكب المميات الملكيه; Coptic: Ϯϫⲓⲛⲟⲩⲱⲛϩ ⲛ̀ⲛⲓⲫⲁⲣⲁⲱ ⲛ̀ⲛⲟⲩⲃ (Tiḏinouōnh nnipharaō nnoub)) was held in Cairo, Egypt, on the 3rd of April 2021. It was a means to encourage tourism in Egypt again. It involved the transportation of twenty-two ancient Egyptian mummies from the Egyptian Museum in Tahrir Square to the National Museum of Egyptian Civilization in Fustat. The mummies included in the parade were all Kings and Queens of the New Kingdom.

This event was broadcast live through the country's major television channels, and was also covered by some major international news agencies.

The concert was led by the United Philharmonic Orchestra with Egyptian Conductor Nader Abbassi, and music by Egyptian composer Hesham Nazih.

== Background ==
The twenty-two mummies that were moved were discovered in two locations. One being the Royal Cache in Deir el-Bahari and the other at the tomb of Amenhotep II, in 1881 and 1898, respectively. Since their discovery, they had been moved multiple times, until they were finally placed at the Egyptian Museum in Tahrir Square. Over the years, due to the increasing number of archaeological discoveries, the Egyptian Museum started to lose its ability to fully show the artifacts placed in it. This led the government to plan new museums including the Grand Egyptian Museum and the National Museum of Egyptian Civilization (NMEC). Ahead of the event, the Egyptian government began renovating Tahrir Square by restoring a broken-up Obelisk from Tanis that was built by King Ramesses II. They put it in the middle of the square, surrounded by four Sphinxes that were restored and brought from the Karnak Temple in Luxor. In addition, lighting work was done in buildings overlooking the square.

The parade music was composed and arranged by the musician Hisham Nazih, and the work was conducted by Maestro Nader Abbassi. The musical score was notated by Ahmed El-Mogy. The lyrics of the anthem were discovered by the musician Remon Malak, conductor of the United Philharmonic Choir. They consist of selected hymns dedicated to the majesty of the goddess Isis from the Temple of Deir el-Shelwit in Luxor. Linguistic and historical review was carried out by Professor Dr. Maisara Abdullah Hussein, professor at the Faculty of Archaeology, Cairo University. The piece was performed by a choir of 90 singers and one hundred of the most skilled musicians of the United Philharmonic Orchestra, under the direction of Maestro Nader Abbassi.

== Event ==
Excerpts of the parade

Before the event started, several roads had to be closed and traffic had to be rerouted for the rest of that day. In order to be transported, the mummies were placed in containers with a nitrogen atmosphere. Egyptian funerary boats were made for the event, which appeared several times during the event on the lake in front of the National Museum of Egyptian Civilization. The decoration was based on Egyptian funerary boats.

The diplomatic corps in Cairo was summoned to attend a viewing party in the main hall of the NMEC. This included newly inaugurated President el-Sisi, a variety of dignitaries, including the Director-General of UNESCO and the Saudi Arabian and Greek ministers of tourism.

The parade started at 6:30 PM local time. It included a concert by the Egyptian United Philharmonic Orchestra led by Egyptian maestro Nader Abbassi, and composed by Egyptian composer Hesham Nazih. Production design was by Mohamed Attia and direction by Aahmad al Morsy. The concert included chants in the Ancient Egyptian language sung by Egyptian soprano Amira Selim. The lyrics of the hymn performed by Amira Selim, "A Reverence for Isis", were taken from inscriptions on the walls of the Deir el-Shelwit temple in Luxor. Other Ancient Egyptian lyrics that were sung during the parade came from the Book of the Dead and the Pyramid Texts. Two more songs in Classical Arabic and Egyptian Arabic were performed by Reham Abdel Hakim and Nesma Mahgoub, respectively.

Multiple recordings were shown during the parade, including one of Egyptian actors and actresses in many Ancient Egyptian archaeological sites. This included a video of Egyptian actor Khaled El Nabawy touring many sites around Egypt that have been restored in the past few years. Another Egyptian actress who made an appearance was Yousra who appeared crowned on one of the Egyptian funerary boats that were made for the event.

During the parade, roads leading to or near the two museums were closed and under heavy security. At the door of the NMEC, Egyptian President Abdel Fattah el-Sisi received the convoy, which was met with a 21-gun salute by the Republican Guard.

== Reception ==
The parade route from the Egyptian Museum to the National Museum of Egyptian Civilization was about 5 km (3.1 miles) long.

The parade was criticized by some international spectators. Barriers along the route were erected to keep more impoverished areas of Cairo out of view, and several informal settlements along the route were demolished and covered with sand. Egyptian historian Khaled Fahmy criticized the militarized aspect of the parade as indictive of the Egyptian regime's "true priorities." Most Egyptians watched the parade on TV, as no vehicles or spectators were allowed along the route.

Egyptian government-controlled news sources claimed that the parade caused an upswell of national pride. The Egyptian ministry of finance issued commemorative Egyptian one pound and one hundred pound coins carrying the name and the official logo of the Pharaohs' Golden Parade, to symbolize this historic cultural event. The logo of the event was based on the ancient Egyptian scarab beetle motif, which symbolized eternity and afterlife. The Egyptian ministry of communications and information technology (MCIT) issued QR Code commemorative stamps carrying the name and the official logo of the Pharaohs' Golden Parade, as well as ones carrying the pictures of the kings and the queens who were transported in the parade.

== Identities of moved mummies ==
The carriages moved in chronological order of their reigns:

- King Seqenenre Tao
- Queen Ahmose-Nefertari
- King Amenhotep I
- Queen Meritamun
- King Thutmose I
- King Thutmose II
- Queen Hatshepsut
- King Thutmose III
- King Amenhotep II
- King Thutmose IV
- King Amenhotep III
- Queen Tiye
- King Seti I
- King Ramesses II
- King Merenptah
- King Seti II
- King Siptah
- King Ramesses III
- King Ramesses IV
- King Ramesses V
- King Ramesses VI
- King Ramesses IX

== See also ==
- Pharaonism – Egyptian nationalist ideology
- Exhumation and reburial of Richard III of England
