= Emad Shahin =

Egyptian professor of political science

- Born: August 24, 1957 (age 69)
- Education: Johns Hopkins University; American University in Cairo
- Awards: IIIT Distinguished Scholar Award, AUC Excellence in Undergraduate Teaching Award
- Scientific career
- Fields: Political Science, Middle Eastern Studies
- Workplaces: Georgetown University, American University in Cairo, Harvard University, Notre Dame University, Boston University, George Washington University Al Akhawayn University in Ifrane, Morocco
- Website: http://emadshahin.com

Emad Shahin (also Emad El-Din Shahin, Arabic: عماد شاهين; born August 24, 1957) is an Egyptian-American professor of political science. He is currently a visiting professor at the School of Foreign Service at Georgetown University. He is editor-in-chief of The Oxford Encyclopedia of Islam and Politics, and professor of public policy at The American University in Cairo (on leave). His work focuses on Comparative Politics, Democracy and Political Reform in Muslim societies, Islam and Politics, and Political Economy of the Middle East.

== Education ==
Shahin holds a Ph.D. (1989) from the Johns Hopkins School of Advanced International Studies, M.A. (1983) and BA (1980) from the American University in Cairo.

== Career ==
Recently, Shahin was affiliated with The Woodrow Wilson International Center for Scholars, and Institute for Religion, Culture and Public Life at Columbia University.

Previously, Shahin was the Henry R. Luce Associate Professor of Religion, Conflict and Peacebuilding, University of Notre Dame's Kroc Institute for International Peace Studies, (2009–2012) and was affiliated with the Kennedy School of Government, and the Islamic Legal Studies Program at Harvard Law School (2006–2009).

== Publications ==
Shahin has authored, co-authored and co-edited six books, and has more than 50 scholarly publications.

=== Books ===
Political Ascent: Contemporary Islamic Movements in North Africa (Boulder, Colorado: Westview Press, 1998). Paperback edition. ISBN 978-0813336176

Political Ascent: Contemporary Islamic Movements in North Africa (Boulder, Colorado: Westview Press, 1997). Hardcover edition.

Through Muslim Eyes: Muhammad Rashid Rida and the West (Herndon, VA: International Institute for Islamic Thought, 1993). Hardcover and paperback editions. ISBN 978-1565641419

=== Edited and Co-authored Work ===
Editor in Chief, The Oxford Encyclopedia of Islam and Politics, 2 vols.(Oxford University Press, 2014). ISBN 978-0199998050

Co-editor with John L. Esposito, The Oxford Handbook of Islam and Politics (Oxford University Press, 2013). ISBN 978-0195395891

Co-editor with Nathan Brown, The Struggle over Democracy in the Middle East and North Africa (Routledge, 2010).

Co-Author, Islam and Democracy: Toward an Effective Citizenship [in Arabic] (Street Law and Center for the Study of Islam and Democracy, 2005).

North Africa section editor, Modernist Islam: A Source Book, Kurzman, Charles, ed., (Oxford University Press, 2002).

=== Select book chapters and articles ===
"The Egyptian Revolution: The Spirit of Tahrir Square," Journal of the Middle East and Africa, 3:46-69, 2012.

"Political Parties in Egypt: Alive, but not Kicking," in Lawson, Kay and Saad Eddin Ibrahim, eds., Political Parties and Democracy: The Arab World (Praeger Publishers, 2010).

"Democratic Transformation in Egypt: Controlled Reforms…Frustrated Hopes," in Brown, Nathan and Emad El-Din Shahin, eds. The Struggle over Democracy in the Middle East and North Africa (Routledge, 2010).

"Egypt," with Nathan Brown, in Angrist, Michele Penner ed., Politics and Society in the Contemporary Middle East (Lynne Reinner, 2010).

"Egypt," in Encyclopedia of Islamic Political Thought, eds. Gerhard Böwering, Patricia Crone, WadadKadi, Devin Stewart, and M. Qasim Zaman (Princeton University Press, 2013)

"Toleration in Modern Islamic Polity: Contemporary Islamist Views," in Creppell, Ingrid, Stephen Macedo, and Russel Hardin, eds., Toleration on Trial (Lexington Books, 2008).

"Political Islam in Egypt," in Emerson, Michael and Richard Youngs, eds., Political Islam and European Foreign Policy (Brussels: Center for European Policy Studies, 2007): 65–85.

"Egypt: The Year of the Elections and Elusive Political Reforms," in the Mediterranean Yearbook Med.2006 (Barcelona: European Institute of the Mediterranean, 2006): 129–131.

"Egypt’s Moment of Reform: A Reality or an Illusion?" in Emerson, Michael, ed., Democratization in the European Neighbourhood (Brussels: Center for European Policy Studies, 2005): 117–130; also available as CEPS Policy Brief, No. 78 (July 2005): 1–6.

"Political Islam: Ready for Engagement?" Working paper No. 3 (Madrid: FRIDE, February 2005).

Contributed twenty-two entries on: Amarah, Muhammad; Ashmawi, Muhammad Said; Bel Haj, Ali; Berbers; Cairo; al-Fustat; Ghazan Khan, Mahmud; IbnTulun, Ahmad; Islamic Jihad Community; Jabiri, Muhammad Abid; Khayr al-Din al-Tunisi; Majd, Ahmad Kamal Abul al-; Mahmud II; Bin Nabi, Malik; al-Maqrizi, Taqi al-Din; Nizam al-Mulk; Qarawiyin Mosque; al-Rawdah; Sharawi, Shaykh Muhammad Mutawali; Suleyman, Mawlay; Thaalibi, Abd al-Aziz; Yassin, Abd al-Salam.

"The Foreign Policy of the Islamic Salvation Front in Algeria," Islam and Christian-Muslim Relations, the Center for Christian-Muslim Understanding, Georgetown University, Vol. 14, No. 2 (Spring 2003): 121–143.

Six introductions for the chapters on Muhammad `Abduh, Qassim Amin, Khayr al-Din al-Tunsi, Muhammad Rashid Rida, Abd al-Hamid IbnBadis, and Rifa`a al-Tahtawi, in Kurzman, Charles, ed., Modernist Islam: A Source Book (Oxford University Press, 2002): 31, 40, 50, 61, 77, and 93.

"Secularism and Nationalism: The Political Discourse of Abd al-Salam Yassin," in Islamism and Secularism in North Africa, John Rudey (ed.). (Saint Martin's, 1994): 167–86.

"Tunisia's Renaissance Party: The Rise and Repression of an Islamic Movement". Middle East Insight, Vol. 11, No. 2 (January–February 1995): 29–35.

"Under the Shadow of the Imam: Morocco's Diverse Islamic Movements". Middle East Insight, Vol. 11, No. 2 (January–February 1995): 40–45.

"Algeria: The Limits to Democracy". Middle East Insight, Vol. 8, No. 6 (July–October, 1992): 10–19.

"Islam, Democracy and The West: Ending the Cycle of Denial". In Mona Abu al-Fadl (ed.), Proceedings of the 21st Annual Conference of the Association of Muslim Social Scientists, (Virginia: IIIT, 1993): 495–501.

"Muhammad Rashid Rida's Perspectives on the West as Reflected in Al-Manar". The Muslim World, Vol. 79, No. 2 (April, 1989): 113–32.

== Media Appearances ==
Shahin's op-eds were published in The New York Times, The Washington Post, The Guardian, CNN, Atlantic Monthly, Foreign Policy, Al-Ahram and Al-Shorouk. He has also made appearances with Charlie Rose, Diane Rhem Show, Christiane Amanpour, NPR, CNN, BBC, CBC Canada, Voice of America, Huffington Post, Al-Jazeera Arabic and English.

== Political Case ==
In January 2014 Shahin was accused in a case known as "Grand Espionage" The charges included: espionage, leading an illegal organization, providing a banned organization with information and financial support, calling for the suspension of the constitution, preventing state institutions and authorities from performing their functions, harming national unity and social harmony, and causing to change the government by force. Shahin issued a statement in which he refuted all allegations.

Following the charges, Shahin received international support from fellow scholars, academic institutions and organizations among those were The Middle East Studies Association of North America (MESA), The Royal Swedish Academy of Sciences,Center for Contemporary Arab Studies, Georgetown University, The International Steering Committee of the Community of Democracies,

On May 16, 2015, Shahin was sentenced to death in absentia by a Cairo court, along with former Egyptian President Mohamed Morsy and 100 others. On June 16, 2015, the death sentence was confirmed. He issued another statement.

More than 40 scholars, colleagues and friends of Emad Shahin, including Joel Beinin, Eva Bellin, Nathan J. Brown, Rochelle Davis, Larry Diamond, Michele Dunne, John P. Entelis, John L Esposito, Khaled Fahmy, Ellis Goldberg, Ambassador Daniel Kurtzer, Roger Owen, James Piscatori, William B. Quandt, Tariq Ramadan, Robert Springborg, Ambassador (retired) William A. Rugh, Alfred Stepan and I. William Zartman wrote an open letter in which they expressed deep concern over the provisional sentence of death. They called on governments throughout the world "to speak out and communicate their concern to their Egyptian counterparts and to rebuff any efforts to restrict Professor Shahin’s movements, speech, and activities." The scholars confirmed that "based on our personal knowledge of Professor Shahin’s character, activities, and scholarship, we state that the charges are so utterly alien to his character as to lack any credibility whatsoever."

MESA also issued another letter in protest of provisional sentencing to death of Emad Shahin. The statement called on the Egyptian government "to rescind Shahin’s conviction immediately and dismiss all charges against him". Similarly, the Committee of Concerned Scientists joined the numerous academics who condemned this sentence which it described as " retaliation for Shahin’s pro-democracy stance."

Shahin's case acquired a lot of media coverage in the US: The New York Times, CNN. His story was also featured in international media outlets such as VG, Die Welt, BILD, El Mundo, La Presse Canada, Internazionale, Le Figaro.

Following the sentence, Shahin made interviews with international media including: Vice news, AFP, Huffpost Live, National Public Radio, Colorado Public Radio, Boston NPR's National Radio, Aljazeera English and Georgetown's Vox Populi.
