= Frederick March =

Frederick March may refer to:

- Frederick Hamilton March (1891–1977), Australian soldier
- Fredric March (1897–1975), American actor
