= The Originals (film) =

- Directed by: Marwan Hamed
- Screenplay by: Ahmed Mourad
- Produced by: New Century productions
- Starring: Maged El Kedwany; Khaled El Sawy; Menna Shalabi
- Cinematography: Ahmed El Morsy
- Edited by: Ahmed Hafez
- Music by: Hesham Nazih, Mohamed Elhusseini
- Release date: 25 June 2017
- Running time: 125 minutes
- Country: Egypt
- Language: Arabic
- Box office: 8,676,740 EGP

The Originals (Arabic: الأصليين, translit. Al Aslyeen) is a 2017 Egyptian mystery drama film directed by Marwan Hamed.

== Cast ==
- Maged El Kedwany as Sameer 'Aliwah
- Khaled El Sawy as Rusdy Abaza
- Menna Shalabi as Thoraya Galal
- Kenda Aloush as Mahitab
- Mohamed Mamdouh

== See also ==
- Cinema of Egypt
- Lists of Egyptian films
- List of Egyptian films of the 2010s
- List of Egyptian films of 2017
