= Hend Sabry =

Tunisian actress (born 1979)

- هند صبري
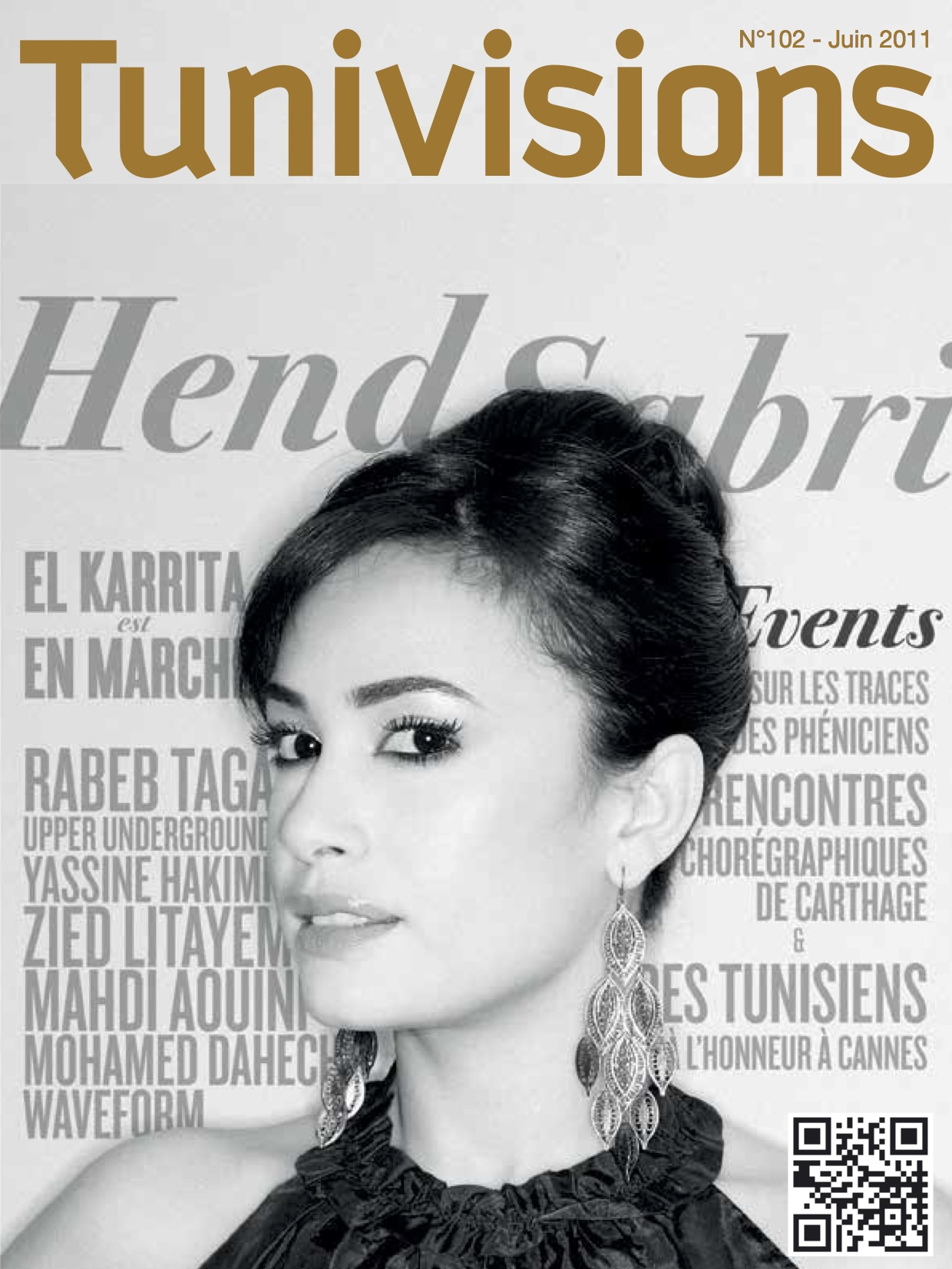
- Sabry on the cover of Tunivisions, June 2011
- Born: 1979 (age 46–47); Kebili, Tunisia
- Citizenship: Egypt; Tunisia
- Occupation: Actress • model
- Years active: 1994–present
- Known for: Egyptian cinema
- Spouse: Ahmad el Sherif

Hend Sabry (Arabic: هند صبري, born 1979) is a Tunisian actress and producer. One of the Arab world's best known actresses, she is known for her film and television roles including:The Silences of the Palace,The Yacoubian Building, The Flower Of Aleppo, Finding Ola, and Four Daughters.

== Early life and education ==
Hend Sabry was born in 1979 in Kebili, Tunisia.

When she was 13, she landed her first role as the lead in The Silences of the Palace, considered a classic of contemporary Arab cinema. She did not take another role until The Season of Men (2000). She received her law degree in 2001, followed by a master’s degree in intellectual property and copyright law in 2004, both from Tunis University.

== Career ==
=== The 1990s/2000s ===
Sabry’s breakthrough in the film industry was in 1994 at the age of 13 in The Silences of the Palace (Samt El Qosour), the debut feature of Moufida Tlatli. The Tunisian film won numerous awards including the Cannes Film Festival’s Camera d’Or and earned Sabry the Best Actress award at the Carthage Film Festival that year. The film is considered a classic in Arab Cinema and in 2021 was ranked 1st on the list of the 100 Best Women's Films in the history of Arab Cinema and 5th in the Dubai International Film Festival (DIFF)'s publication Cinema of Passion: Dubai's list of the 100 Most Important Arab Films.

After The Silences of the Palace, Sabry took a break from acting to continue her studies. She returned to the big screen in Tlatli’s second feature, The Season of Men (2000) a feminist critique of the traditional code of behavior that many Tunisian women are subjected to. It premiered at Cannes' Un Certain Regard.

In 2001 Sabry received her law degree from Tunis University and went on to appear in her first Egyptian film, Diary Of A Teenager (Mothakerat Morahkah) helmed by Inas El-Degheidy, whose films often center around female characters and with frank depictions of sexuality. The story of a teenage girl (Sabry) who embarks on a sexual relationship proved to be controversial in Egypt for breaking taboos around pre-marital sex. Sabry was surprised by the reaction: “I came from a [Tunisian] cinema that was much more progressive and visually much more daring as well as in the storytelling. I was very ignorant about Egyptian cinema because I was Francophone, Francophile, and more into Western movies so I didn’t know what I was getting myself into.” Despite the controversy, the film was a commercial success and her breakthrough film in Egypt.

In the early 2000s, Sabry was traveling back and forth between Egypt and Tunisia juggling both studies and acting. While having put aside her plans of joining the Tunisian Foreign Service to pursue acting full-time, she recognized the importance of intellectual property (IP) to a career in the film industry, and received a master’s degree in intellectual property and copyright law in 2004.

In 2002 Sabry starred in Daoud Abdel Sayed’s Egyptian comedy drama A Citizen, A Detective And A Thief (Mowaten we Mokhber we Haramy) alongside the popular musician-actor Shaaban Abdel Rehim. This film too, proved controversial around its depiction of sex, as well as of censorship and police ineptitude. It was nonetheless a box office hit in Egypt and the region. Sabry’s first blockbuster came in 2006 with The Yacoubian Building (Oumaret Yacoubian), Marwan Hamad’s international breakthrough feature adapted from Alaa Al Aswany’s eponymous 2007 social satire set against the backdrop of an apartment building in downtown Cairo. It was Egypt’s most expensive film to date and went on to set a record for the biggest debut ever for an Egyptian theatrical release. It was also the first of a series of collaborations between Sabry and Hamad.

A lover of the short film format, that same year, she appeared in an indie short, Rise and Shine (2006) by Egyptian director Sherif Elbendary, which won numerous awards locally and internationally including at the Tribeca Film Festival.

In 2009 Sabry appeared in Marwan Hamad’s second feature, Ibrahim Labyad (2009) an Egyptian drama co-starring Ahmed El-Sakka one of Egypt’s biggest stars.

=== The 2010s ===
In keeping with her stated preference for taking on socially relevant roles, Sabry increasingly appeared in films and series with a perceived social impact. The 2010 comedy series I Want to Get Married (Ayiza Atgawez) would prove seminal to Sabry’s career. Adapted from Ghada Abdel Aal‘s popular autobiographical blog-turned-book, the series pokes fun at—while criticizing—the pressures Egyptian women face to get married young. The series was a big success in the MENA region turning Sabry, who plays a pharmacist desperate to get married before she turns 30, into a regional star. A Netflix reboot of the series twelve years later would be another important marker in her career.

In 2011 Sabry appeared in Asmaa, director and writer Amr Salama's second feature which sought to raise awareness and change misconceptions about AIDS in Egypt. Inspired by the real events, the story follows an Egyptian woman with HIV who died from a burst gallbladder because doctors refused to operate on her. The film had a successful run on the international festival circuit, and won several awards including the 2012 Murex d'Or Award for Best Arabian Actress for Sabry.

In 2013, Arabian Business listed her among the "100 most powerful Arab Women". In 2014 she became a partner of Tayarah, one of Egypt's biggest platforms for video and digital content production. In 2015 she established her Cairo-based Salam Production company.

The Tunisian drama The Flower Of Aleppo (2016) was the first film produced under the banner of Salam Production. Sabry played the lead role of a mother who disguises herself as a Jihadi woman to rescue her teenage son who had joined ISIS in Aleppo, Syria. That same year she appeared in the drama series Life is Beautiful, (Halawat Al Dounia) about a woman who is diagnosed with leukemia right before getting married, and starring opposite fellow Tunisian Dhafer L’Abidine. In December, the Cairo International Film Festival (CIFF) bestowed her with the Faten Hamama Award for Excellence at the 2017 edition.

In 2019, Sabry appeared in two notable, though vastly different films. In The Blue Elephant 2, an Egyptian horror film by Marwan Hamad, she starred alongside a cast of Egyptian stars that included Karim Abdel Aziz, Nelly Karim, and Tara Emad. A sequel to Hamad's The Blue Elephant (2014), it became the highest-earning film in Egyptian history. In Noura's Dream a small Tunisian independent film, she plays a working-class mother of three in the wake of the Arab Spring whose abusive husband is being released from prison early. The film won the Golden Tanit award and the Best Actress Award for Sabry at the Carthage Film Festival. About working in Tunisia, Sabry said: “I try to work there every three to four years because I don’t want to stay away longer. It’s always a pleasure because it’s a small industry. Not even an industry, it’s a craftsmanship; small films with very low budgets and no star system. It’s a reality check and only your performance matters. I can also speak in my mother tongue, which always helps me in my performance.”

Sabry became the first Arab woman to ever receive the Starlight Cinema Award of the Venice Film Festival in 2019.

=== The 2020s ===
In 2020 Netflix announced that it was partnering with Sabry to develop Finding Ola, a reboot of her 2010 I Want to Get Married (Ayiza Atgawez) series. For the first time, Sabry also assumed the role of executive producer. Released in February 2022, the series finds Ola, now a mother of two, trying to rebuild her life when her husband announces he wants a separation. The series made it to the streamer’s Top 10 worldwide and also kept the number one spot for three weeks in the Arab-speaking world.

In 2022 Sabry would again collaborate with Marwan Hamad (for the fourth time) in the record-breaking blockbuster Kira and El Gin and opposite Ahmed Ezz and Karim Abdel Aziz. An anti-colonial drama adapted from Ahmed Mourad’s 2014 novel 1919, the film is set during the Egyptian independence movement of the 1920s. It was a critical and commercial success, breaking the previous record held by Hamad's 2019 hit Blue Elephant 2.

In 2023, Sabry starred in Tunisian director Kaouther Ben Hania’s documentary Four Daughters about a mother and two daughters’ recounting of the traumatic loss of the two older daughters who left the family to join ISIS. Sabry is one of several actresses who played out key scenes involving the mother and departed sisters. Universally acclaimed, Four Daughters took home three prizes at Cannes 2023 and was in contention for both Best Documentary and Best International Feature Film at the 2023 Oscars.

In 2024 Sabry took on the starring role of Amira in Moftaraq Toroq (Crossroads), the Arabic adaptation of the popular American series The Good Wife. It launched in June to top ratings across the MENA region. Sabry and the writers were intentional in adapting the storyline to regional cultural norms. For example, they tread carefully in depicting how her character interacted with her boss—a relationship filled with sexual tension in the original series. Later in 2024, she returned to the small screen in season two of Finding Ola and once again serving as executive producer.

That same year, Sabry appeared in Aserb: The Squadron, an Egyptian action film based on the actual events of the massacre of 21 Egyptian Copts in Libya and the ensuing Egyptian military operations against the perpetrators.

Sabry, who had always represented herself, signed with the Hollywood talent agency CAA in 2023 explaining that, in addition to identifying more acting roles, she was interested in securing more female-driven projects for her Salam Production company. Sabry has been critical about the Arab film industry's discrimination toward women. "We face many challenges. We are paid far less than our male counterparts, and we also get less exposure than they do. There are also far fewer scripts written for female characters. Male characters predominate and remain the motor of Arab cinema. Producers and distributors generally still don’t see actresses in the region as powerhouses who can boost box office revenues. Also, women who become professional actors are held to different standards than men."

In 2025, Sabry signed on with Cairo-based talent management agency MAD Celebrity to represent her in North Africa and the Middle East. In December she received the Omar Sharif Award by the Golden Globes at the Red Sea Film Festival. Launched the previous year, the award honors outstanding achievements in Arab cinema and television.

In February 2026, Sabry appeared in Manna’a (Immunity), a thriller television series in which she plays the lead role of a drug kingpin in 1980s Cairo. After focusing on television during the previous several years, the actress took on several projects aimed for release in cinemas. In the spring of 2026 she finished filming the feature His Weakest Creatures (Ad’af Khalqoh) directed by Omar Hilal and starring opposite Ahmed Helmy and completed production of Ahmed Fouzi Saleh's Hamlet, a local adaption of Shakespeare's classic tragedy.

== Philanthropy ==
In 2010 she was appointed a goodwill ambassador against hunger by the UN World Food Programme (WFP). In November 2023 she resigned from her role, citing their failure to act during the Israeli blockade of the Gaza Strip.

== Personal life ==
Sabry was once engaged to Syrian actor Bassel Khaiat. She married Egyptian businessman Ahmad el Sherif in 2008, and they have two daughters.

Sabry holds dual nationality, of both her home country Tunisia, and her country of residence, Egypt.

== Filmography ==
=== Films ===
Year	Title	Translation	Role	Notes
1994	Samt El Qosor	The Silences of the Palace	Alya	
2000	Mawsem El Rejal	The Season of Men	Amna	
2001	Muwaten W Mokhber W Harami	Citizen, Informer and Thief	Hayat	
2001	Mozakkerat Moraheqah	A Teenager's Dairies	Gamilah	
2002	El kotbia	The Bookseller	Lila	
2002	Ara'es El Tin	Clay Dolls	Feddah	
2003	Ezzay El Banat Tehebbak	How the Girls Love You	Mirna	
2003	'Ayez Ha'i	I Want My Share= Prerogative	Wafa	
2004	Halet Hobb	Love Situation	Habibah	
2004	Ahla El Aw'at	The Best of Times	Yosriyyah	
2005	Banat West El Balad	Downtown Girls	Jominah	
2005	Ouija	Ouija	Faridah	
2006	Le'bet El Hobb	The Game Of Love	Lila	
2006	Malek W Ktabah	Heads and Tails	Hend	
2006	Emaret Ya'kobyan	The Yacoubian Building	Bothaynah	
2006	Sabah El Fol	Sambac Morning	Thana	
2007	El Gezirah	The Island	Karimah	
2007	El Torbini	El Torbini	Malak	
2008	Genenet El Asmak	The Aquarium	Lila	
2009	Ibrahim EL Abyad	Ibrahim Labyad	Horiyyah	
2009	Heliopolis	Heliopolis	Nagla	Voice
2011	Asmaa	Asmaa	Asmaa	
2014	La mo'akhza	Excuse My French		
2014	El Gezirah 2	The Island 2	Karimah	
2016	Zahrat Halab	The Flower of Aleppo	Salma	
2017	El Kenz: El Haqiqah W El Khayal	The Treasure: Reality and Fantasy	Hatshepsut	
2019	El Fil El Azraq 2	The Blue Elephant 2	Faridah	
2019	El Kenz 2	The Treasure 2	Hatshepsut	
2022	Kira W EL Gin	Kira and the Jinn	Dawlat	
2023	Four Daughters		Olfa	
2024	Aserb: The Squadron			

=== Television series ===
Year	Series	Translation	Role
2007	Lahazah Haregah	Critical Trice	
2008	Maktub	Fate	Ebtesam
2008	Ba'd El Foraq	After the Break Up	Sokkarah
2010	Ard Khas	Special Show	
2010	Ayza Atgawwez	I Want to Marry	Ola
2012	Vertigo	Vertigo	Faridah
2014	Emperatoriyyet Min ?	Whose Empire?	Amirah
2017	Halawet El Donya	Sweetness Of World	ِ Aminah
2021	Hagmah Mortaddah	Counter-Attack	Dina
2022	Al ba7th 3an Ola	Finding Ola	Ola
2024	Moftaraq Toroq	Crossroads	Ameera

== Accolades ==
=== Awards and nominations ===
Name of the award ceremony, year presented, category, nominee(s) of the award, and the result of the nomination
Award ceremony	Year	Category	Recipient	Result	Ref.
Alexandria International Film Festival	2017	Best Actress	The Flower Of Aleppo	Won	
America Abroad Media organization	2017	Media Award	Hend Sabry	Won	
Arab Film Festival	2008	Best Actress (Jury Prize)	The Aquarium	Won	
Beirut International Women Film Festival	2025	Honorary Award	Hend Sabry	Won	
Cairo Arab Media Festival	2010	Best Comic Actress	I Want to Marry	Won	
Cairo National Festival for Egyptian Cinema	2002	Horus Award	A Citizen, A Detective & A Thief	Won	
Cairo National Festival for Egyptian Cinema	2005	Special Award	The Best of Times	Won	
Cairo National Festival for Egyptian Cinema	2008	Horus Award	The Island	Won	
Cairo International Film Festival	2017	Faten Hamama Excellence Award	Hend Sabry	Won	
Carthage Film Festival	1994	Best Actress	The Silences of the Palace	Won	
Carthage Film Festival	2019	Best Actress	Noura's Dream	Won	
Dear Guest Festival Awards	2011	Best Actress - Cinema	Asmaa	Won	
Dear Guest Festival Awards	2014	Best Actress - Cinema	Excuse My French	Won	
Dear Guest Festival Awards	2019	Best Actress - Cinema	The Blue Elephant 2	Won	
Egyptian Journalists Union	2005	Best Actress	The Best of Times	Won	
El Gouna Film Festival	2019	Best Actress	Noura's Dream	Won	
EniGma Achievement Awards	2022	Excellence in Film & Television	Hend Sabry	Won	
Golden Globes	2025	Omar Sharif Award	Hend Sabry	Won	
Joy Awards	2023	Best Actress - Film	Kira And The Jinn	Won	
Murex D'Or	2007	Best Arabian Cinema Actress	The Yacoubian Building	Won	
Murex D'Or	2012	Best Arabian Cinema Actress	Asmaa	Won	
Murex D'Or	2018	Best Arabian Cinema Actress	Halawet El Donia: Life is Beautiful	Won	
Namur International Francophone Film Festival	2002	Best Actress - Comedy	Clay Dolls	Won	
NRJ Radio	2017	Best Actress	Halawet El Donia: Life is Beautiful	Won	
Rabat International Festival of Film	2004	Best Actress	The Best of Times	Won	
The Critics Awards For Arab Films (Note: The ceremony is slated to take place at the Cannes Film Festival every year.)	2020	Best Actress	Noura's Dream	Won	
The Critics Awards For Arab Films	2024	Best Actress	Four Daughters and Kira And The Jinn	Nominated	
Venice Film Festival	2019	Starlight Cinema Award	Hend Sabry	Won	

=== State honors ===
Country / Organization	Year	Honor	Ref.
France	2021	Officer of the Order of Arts and Letters	
Tunisia	2010	Grand Officer of the National Order of Merit	
United Nations World Food Programme	2021	Nobel Commemorative Pin and Certificate	

=== Listicles ===
Publisher	Year	List	Position	Ref.
BBC	2024	100 Women	Placed	
Forbes Middle East	2017	The Top 10 Arab Female Actors	1st	
