= Amira Selim =

French opera singer

Amira Selim أميرة سليم
- Born: Amira Ahmed Fouad Selim; January 1, 1976 (age 49); Cairo, Egypt
- Genres: mezzo soprano
- Occupation: Opera Singer
- Years active: 1993–present

Amira Selim (born in Cairo, Egypt) is an Egyptian soprano and opera singer, based in France.

== Life ==
Selim was born in Cairo, the daughter of pianist Marcelle Matta and painter Ahmed Fouad Selim. After studying piano, ballet and painting, she started voice training and Italian repertoire in Italy with soprano Gabriella Ravazzi in 1993 and graduated from the Cairo Conservatoire in 1999. In October 2001, she received a scholarship from the French Government to study with soprano Caroline Dumas at the École Normale de Musique de Paris, where she obtained the Diplôme supérieur de concertiste in 2004.

In 2002, she was the first prize winner at the international competition of Orvieto, Italy. Selim started her career as a member and soloist at the Cairo Opera company in 1997 with her first leading role in Rossini’s Opera Il Barbiere di Siviglia in 1998, it was followed by a number of other productions. After moving to France, she continued to feature in Egyptian Opera's as well as French, Italian and German companies.

On April 3, 2021, she participated in the Pharaohs’ Golden Parade, an event during which 22 mummies of Ancient Egyptian kings & queens were moved from the Egyptian Museum to the National Museum of Egyptian Civilization in Cairo. In her performance, she sang "A Reverence for Isis" in the Ancient Egyptian Language, which was taken from inscriptions on the walls on Deir el-Shelwit in Luxor.

== Roles with the Cairo Opera ==
- March 1998 : Rosina in Il Barbiere di Siviglia (Rossini).
- November 1999 : Norina in Don Pasquale (Donizetti).
- February 2000 : Adina in L'elisir d'amore (Donizetti).
- January 2001/February 2008 : Gilda in Rigoletto (Verdi).
- June 2010 : Adina in L'elisir d'amore (Donizetti).

== Other roles ==
- August 1997 : Serafina in Il Campanello (Donizetti), Orvieto, Italy.
- August 2001 : Adina in L’Elisir d’amore (Donizetti), Orvieto, Italy.
- August 2002 : Gilda in Rigoletto (Verdi), Orvieto, Italy.
- May 2004 : Title role Lakmé (Delibes), Rennes, France .
- June 2005 : Ten performances of Carmina Burana, Paris, France.
- January 2006 : Concert Spirits of Mozart, Vienna, Austria.
- April 2006 : Carmina Burana/Recital, Essaouira, Marocco.
- January 2007 : Title-role Lakmé (Delibes), Saint-Étienne, France.
- March 2007 : Nannetta in Falstall (Verdi), Tours, France.
- November 2007 : Queen of the Night in the Magic Flute (Mozart), Marseille, France.
- January 2008 : Title- role Lakmé (Delibes), Bielefeld, Germany.
- April 2008 : Queen of the Night in the Magic Flute (Mozart), Levallois, France.
- October 2009 : Rosina in Il Barbiere di Siviglia (Rossini), Mantoue, Italie.
- January 2010 : Contemporary piece by Suzanne Giraud, Paris.
- March 2010 : Ophelia in Hamlet (Ambroise Thomas), St Etienne, France.

== Discography ==
- Mozart in Egypt (EMI/Virgin Classics, 2005)
- Spirits of Mozart - Christiane Oelze, Amira Selim, Dee Dee Bridgewater, Andrey Boreyko, Vienna Radio Symphony Orchestra (Euroarts, 2006)
