= Charlton Spinks =

British Army officer

Sir Charlton Spinks
- Born: 1877
- Died: 1959 (aged 81–82)
- Military career
- Allegiance: United Kingdom
- Branch: British Army
- Service years: 1900–1937
- Rank: Major-General
- Commands: Sirdar of Egypt
- Conflicts: World War I
- Awards: Knight Commander of the Order of the British Empire; Distinguished Service Order

Major-General Sir Charlton Watson Spinks KBE DSO (1877–1959) was a distinguished British Army officer whose career saw him rise to the esteemed position of Sirdar, or Commander-in-Chief, of the Egyptian Army.

== Military career ==
Commissioned as a second lieutenant in the Royal Artillery on March 17, 1900, Spinks embarked on a remarkable military journey. He steadily advanced, achieving the rank of lieutenant on April 3, 1901. Notably, in March 1902, he was seconded for service under the Colonial Office. He was attached to the Northern Nigeria Regiment during this period, where he played an integral role. Spinks' active engagement continued, evidenced by his participation in significant campaigns. He participated in the Kano-Sokoto Campaign of 1903 and participated in operations against the Okpotos in Bassa Province in 1904.

With the advent of World War I, Spinks contributed his efforts to the conflict. Subsequently, his distinguished career led him to assume the mantle of the last Sirdar of Egypt, a role he held from 1924 to 1937.

Spinks garnered several prestigious honors throughout his career. Among these, he was appointed a Knight Commander of the Order of the British Empire in the 1927 Birthday Honours, awarded the Grand Cordon of the Order of the Nile, designated a Companion of the Distinguished Service Order, and bestowed the title of Grand Officer of the Order of the Crown of Italy. These distinctions underscore his exceptional contributions to both military service and international relations.

Military offices
| Preceded by Sir Lee Stack | Sirdar of the Egyptian Army; 1924–1937 | Succeeded by Position disestablished |
