= The Blue Elephant (novel) =

Novel by Ahmed Mourad

- First edition
- Author: Ahmed Mourad
- Language: Arabic
- Publisher: Dar El-Shorouk
- Publication date: 2012
- Publication place: Egypt
- Pages: 485

The Blue Elephant (Arabic: الفيل الأزرق) is a novel by Ahmed Mourad and published by Dar El-Shorouk in 2012. A film of the novel starring Karim Abdel Aziz premiered in 2014.

== Plot ==
After 5 years of optional isolation, Dr. Yehia Rashed resumes his practice in Abbasia Mental Health Hospital where he finds a surprise awaiting him..

In "8 west"the wing which decides the fate of those who committed crimes, he meets an old friend with a long past. Now this man's fate is between Yehia's hands.

More surprises flow over him and his life flips upside down, for what started as a try to understand the truth behind his friend's past, is now a thrilling adventure to discover himself and what is left of him.

Ahmed Mourad takes us in his third novel to behind the scenes of a strange world which he spent two years studying its details. It's a strange trip where we find the deepest and strangest mysteries of the human soul.

== Reception ==
The Blue Elephant was short-listed for the 2014 International Prize for Arabic Fiction.
