= The Flower of Aleppo =

2016 film

- Film poster
- Directed by: Ridha Behi
- Written by: Ridha Behi
- Produced by: Ridha Behi; Sadik Sabbah; Dimitri Khodr; Hend Sabri; Ziad Hamzeh
- Starring: Hend Sabry; Badis Behi; Hicham Rostom
- Cinematography: Mohamed Maghraoui
- Edited by: Kahena Attia; Reynald Bertrand
- Music by: Omar Aloulou
- Release dates: 28 October 2016 (Carthage FF); 6 November 2016 (Tunisia)
- Running time: 90 minutes
- Country: Tunisia
- Languages: Arabic; French

The Flower of Aleppo (Arabic: زهرة حلب, romanized: Zahrah Ḥalab; French: La Fleur d'Alep) is a 2016 Tunisian drama film directed by Ridha Behi. It was originally selected as the Tunisian entry for the Best Foreign Language Film at the 89th Academy Awards, but this was changed to As I Open My Eyes by Leyla Bouzid.

== Cast ==
- Hend Sabry as Salma
- Hichem Rostom
- Badis Behi as Mourad
- Ahmed Hafiene
- Amer Abu Matar as Abu Khalil

== Release ==
The film was initially screened for the first time at the opening ceremony of the 27th Carthage Film Festival on 28 October 2016, then it had its regular release in theaters in Tunisia on 6 November 2016.

== See also ==
- List of submissions to the 89th Academy Awards for Best Foreign Language Film
- List of Tunisian submissions for the Academy Award for Best Foreign Language Film
