= Randa Kamel =

Randa Kamel (رندا كمال) is an Egyptian oriental dancer, teacher and choreographer. Born in Mansoura, Egypt, she began performing dance as a child and later became a member of the Reda Troupe, the Egyptian folkloric dance company founded by Mahmoud Reda. She subsequently established a career as a solo performer of Egyptian oriental dance and became an international teacher of the style.

== Early life ==
Randa was born in Mansoura, a city in the Nile Delta. According to interviews, she began dancing informally as a child at weddings, parties and school events. Her family initially opposed her interest in professional dancing, which she later described as a significant obstacle in her career.

During her adolescence, Kamel studied Egyptian folkloric dance and joined the Reda Troupe. Sources give slightly different accounts of the chronology of her early training, but agree that she spent approximately seven years with the troupe. Her experience with the Reda Troupe provided training in Egyptian folkloric movement, musical interpretation, balance. Kamel has credited the experience with influencing her subsequent approach to oriental dance.

Kamel described her style as a combination of ballet, Egyptian folklore, her own movements, and movements derived from dancers she admired, including Sohair Zaki and Samia Gamal.

== Career ==
After leaving the Reda Troupe, Randa developed a career as a solo oriental dancer. She worked in Alexandria before moving to Cairo, where she performed in restaurants, cabarets and hotels.

In 2010, Cairo 360 described Randa as one of the major international names performing on the Nile Maxim, placing her among a small group of prominent Egyptian and foreign dancers working in Cairo's professional oriental-dance scene.

Randa has also developed an international teaching career. She has taught Egyptian oriental dance at workshops and festivals in Europe, North America, Asia and elsewhere, and has served as a teacher and judge at international dance events.

== Legacy ==
Randa established the Raqs of Course festival in Cairo. The event was organized as an intensive international oriental-dance program combining workshops, performances, competitions and opportunities for dancers to perform with Randa's orchestra.

Kamel operates a dance school and music-recording studio associated with her teaching activities in Cairo. Her organization also provides accommodation for visiting dancers attending her programs.
