= Mahmoud Reda =

Egyptian choreographer and dancer (1930–2020)

- محمود رضا محمد رضا
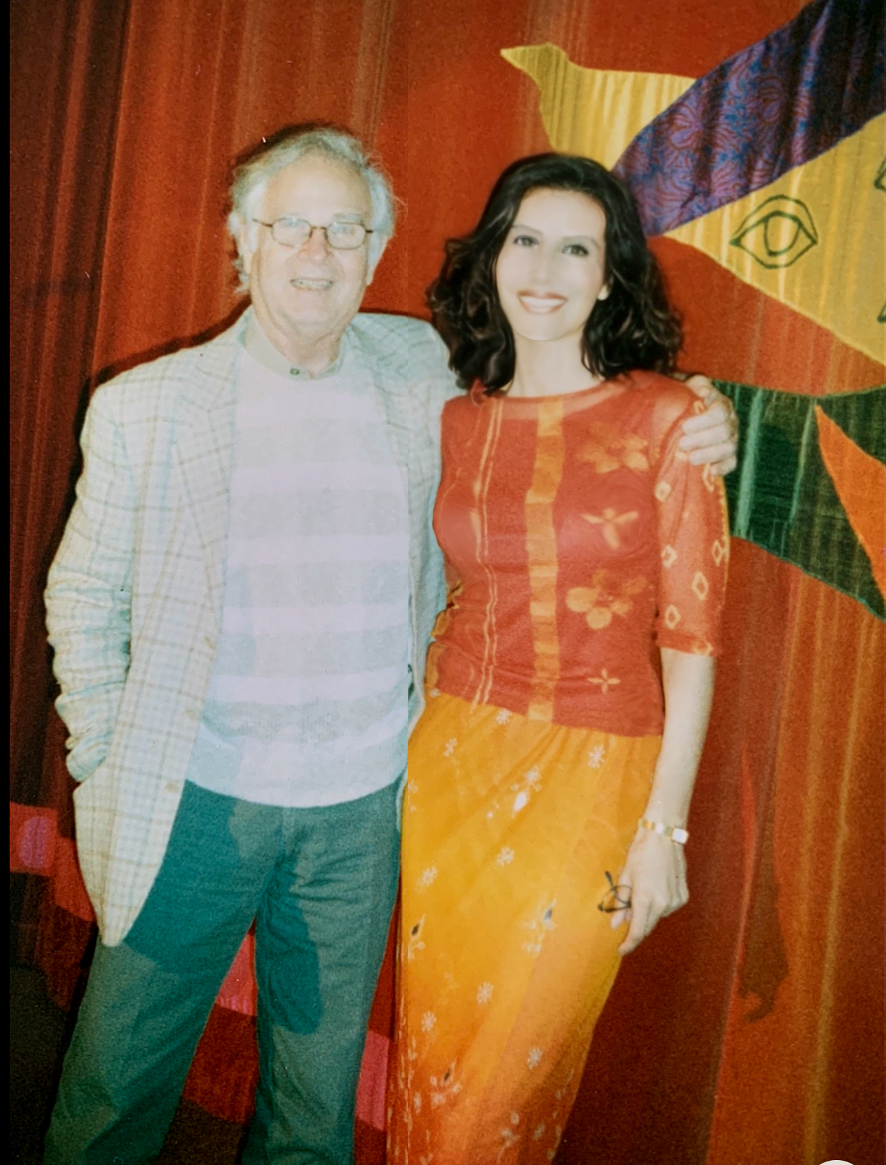
- Reda with Layla Taj

Personal information
- Full name: Mahmoud Reda Mohamed Reda
- Born: 18 March 1930 Cairo, Kingdom of Egypt
- Died: 10 July 2020 (aged 90) Cairo, Egypt

Gymnastics career
- Discipline: Men's artistic gymnastics
- Country represented: Egypt
- Career
- Former groups: Reda Troupe

Mahmoud Reda Mohamed Reda (Arabic: محمود رضا; 18 March 1930 – 10 July 2020) was an Egyptian actor and dancer who competed at the 1952 Summer Olympics and co-founded the Reda Troupe.

== Early life and education ==
Reda was born in Cairo, Kingdom of Egypt, on 18 March 1930. He was the eighth of ten children and his father was the head librarian at Cairo University. His elder brother Ali was a dancer, and through his influence (and that of Gene Kelly and Fred Astaire films), Mahmoud became interested in dance. He attended Cairo University where he received a degree in political economics.

== Gymnastics career ==
Reda originally trained as a gymnast, representing Egypt in the 1952 Summer Olympics in Helsinki. He competed in all six men's events, with his floor exercise receiving his highest placement in a tie for 105th place. As a result, he finished 181st in the all-around. His team scored 514.90 points, which gave Egypt a 16th-place finish.

== Dance career ==
Reda's main interest was dance and he joined an Argentinian dance troupe after graduating and toured Europe. While on tour in Paris he resolved to start his own dance troupe back in Egypt, but due to lack of funds he had to work as an accountant for Royal Dutch Shell. He joined the Heliolido Club in Cairo, where he met Anglo-Egyptian baladi dancer Farida Fahmy, who became his dancing partner. After the two performed in the Soviet Union in 1957, they decided to start a folk dancing troupe in Egypt with Ali Reda.

=== The Reda Troupe ===
When the Reda brothers and Fahmy founded the state-sponsored Reda Troupe in 1959 it consisted of only twelve dancers and twelve musicians. Reda's choreography combined traditional Egyptian folk dances with Western styles like ballet. Reda later described his style:

when you bring them, the real folkloric dancers, put them on stage, they look odd, they look strange. Their costumes, they don't know where to look, they don't know, and if they do their things, it's very monotonous. So what I call my choreography is not folkloric. It's inspired by the folkloric. There is like 90% extra put on the dance.

Due to the social connections of Fahmy and her family, the normally stigmatized profession of dance was deemed acceptable by Cairo society and both men and women attended performances by the troupe.

Although the Reda Troupe was well known in Cairo society, initially it was not in Egypt as a whole. That changed in 1961, however, when Mahmoud Reda and Fahmy starred in the film Igazah nisf as-sinah along with the rest of the troupe. Directed by Ali Reda, the film was responsible for popularizing the Reda Troupe among ordinary Egyptians. The team followed this success with Gharam fi al-karnak in 1967. In 1970, the troupe appeared in a third film Harami El-Waraqa. Reda stepped down as the principal dancer of the troupe in 1972, but still continued choreographing and directing performances. By this time, the troupe had grown to one hundred and fifty dancers, musicians and stage crew. Under Reda's direction, the Reda Troupe toured the world, giving performances at Carnegie Hall, and in China. They went on five international tours during his tenure, performing for various world leaders. In 1990, Reda retired as director of the Reda Troupe.

== Later life and death ==
Reda married Nadeeda Fahmy, the elder sister of Farida Fahmy, in 1955. She worked as the Reda Troupe's costume designer until her death from rheumatic heart disease in 1960. His second wife was a Yugoslavian ballet dancer, with whom he had a daughter, Shereen.

After his retirement, Reda continued to teach dance workshops in Egypt and internationally. His former students include Keti Sharif, Randa Kamel, Dina Talaat, Layla Taj, and Mohamed Ghareb.

He died on 10 July 2020, aged 90.
