= The Aquarium (film) =

2008 film

- Directed by: Yousry Nasrallah
- Written by: Nasser Abdel- Rahmane; Yousry Nasrallah
- Produced by: Ihab Ayoub
- Starring: Hend Sabri; Amr Waked; Gamil Ratib
- Music by: Tamer Karawan
- Release date: March 26, 2008
- Running time: 90 minutes
- Countries: Egypt; Germany; France
- Language: Arabic

The Aquarium (Arabic: جنينة الاسماك, translit. Genenet Al Asmak) is a 2008 Egyptian drama film directed by Yousry Nasrallah.

== Introduction ==
Filmed in Egypt, Genenet Al Asmak (جنينة الاسماك) captures not only Cairo's Grotto Gardens but also her wounded society- a city of repression. Filmed in long continuous takes, the film conveys a sense of the real Egypt, through the depiction of the lives of Laila and Youssef.

== Synopsis ==
Laila, portrayed by Hend Sabri, is a rather unhappy and lonely radio talk show host who listens to other people's fantasies on her late night segment. Youssef, played by Amr Waked, is an anesthetist by day and an illegal abortion surgeon by night. The story begins with each character's separate tale being told in parallel and the difficulties they face with society. The protagonists have one thing in common, loneliness. Perhaps a way to satisfy this, they both feed off the grief of others- Laila through her talk show and Youssef at his legal place of work. Genenet Al Asmak can be compared to a 48-hour walk in Laila and Amr's lives. From the issues faced in the household by Amr and his terminal father played by Gamil Ratib to Laila's occasional party-girl evenings with her friends, "a walk in their shoes" effect is established. The film ends with the two protagonists physically meeting in Egypt's Grotto Gardens and realizing the loneliness they feel in each other.

Genenet Al Asmak tells the story of how everyday citizens function in the Egyptian society and find ways of release in a number of ways. Shot around Egypt, the film explores the country's political and moral situation with the help of Laila and Youssef.

== Cast ==
- Hend Sabri as Laila
- Amr Waked as Youssef
- Gamil Ratib as Youssef’s father
- Samah Anwar as Marguerite
- Bassem Samra as Zakki
- Tamim Abdou as Samir
