= The Blue Elephant 2 =

2019 film by Marwan Hamed

- Directed by: Marwan Hamed
- Written by: Ahmed Mourad
- Starring: Karim Abdel Aziz; Nelly Karim; Hend Sabry; Shereen Reda
- Cinematography: Ahmed El Morsi
- Edited by: Mohamed Attia
- Music by: Hesham Nazih, Mohamed Elhusseini
- Production companies: Rotana TV; Synergy Films
- Distributed by: Rotana TV; Rotana Studios
- Release date: July 25, 2019
- Running time: 130 minutes
- Country: Egypt
- Language: Arabic

The Blue Elephant 2 (Arabic: 2 الفيل الأزرق, translit. Al Fil Al Azraq 2) is a 2019 Egyptian drama horror mystery crime thriller film directed by Marwan Hamed. The film is a sequel to the 2014 box office hit film The Blue Elephant. Produced under the banner Rotana Film Production and Synergy Films, most of the crew members who were originally part of the prequel were retained. The film stars Karim Abdel Aziz, Khaled El Sawy, Nelly Karim and Shereen Reda in the lead roles.

Principal photography of the film commenced in November 2018. The film had its theatrical release on 25 July 2019 and received positive reviews from the critics. Similar to the prequel film, it also became a successful venture at the box office. It also became the highest grossing Egyptian film in the history of Egyptian cinema collecting E£100 million at the box office.

== Plot ==
Dr. Yehia (Karim Abdel Aziz) is now married to Lobna (Nelly Karim) and fathered another child with her. He has abandoned psychology and currently works in real estate.

A new inmate in the women's section of the psychiatric hospital, Farida, killed her son and husband, and claimed she had no memory of it. When questioned, she insists that she must see Dr. Yehia to confess to him what happened. She is a former colleague of Yehia's wife at the bank she used to work at.

Farida emphasizes the death of his entire family is only three nights away. She prophesies that the family dog will die on the first night, and later that he will encounter the Blue Elephant in a tragic accident.

On the first night, the dog dies. The next morning, Yehia's car crashes into a truck with a blue elephant logo. Later, his two children inexplicably become unconscious.

Yehia then acquires the blue elephant pills in an attempt to control things and solve the puzzles he faces. Like in the first film, he sees visions of the past and meets the demonic woman who has controlled Farida's body.

== Cast ==
- Karim Abdel Aziz as Dr. Yehia Rashed
- Khaled El Sawy as Sherif Al Kordy
- Nelly Karim as Lobna
- Hend Sabry as Farida
- Shereen Reda as Deega
- Eyad Nassar as Akram
- Tara Emad as Mermed
- Amgad Elsharqawy as Joy
- Maha Abou Ouf as Mother of Farida

== Marketing ==
The official trailer of the film was unveiled by the film director on 10 June 2019 and it crossed 15 million views within the 24 hours.

== See also ==
- Cinema of Egypt
