= Noura's Dream =

2020 Tunisian drama film

- Film Poster
- Directed by: Hinde Boujemaa
- Written by: Hinde Boujemaa; Laurent Brandenbourger
- Produced by: Marie Besson; François d'Artemare; Tatjana Kozar; Imed Marzouk; Samuel Tilman
- Starring: Hind Sabri; Lotfi Abdelli; Hakim Boumsaoudi; Imen Cherif
- Cinematography: Martin Rit
- Edited by: Nicolas Rumpl
- Production companies: Eklektik Productions; Les Films de l'Après-Midi
- Distributed by: Wild Bunch Distribution
- Release date: September 2019 (San Sebastian)
- Running time: 92 minutes
- Countries: Tunisia; Belgium; France; Qatar; Netherlands
- Language: Arabic
- Budget: €50,000 (estd.)
- Box office: $80,675

Noura's Dream (French: Noura Rêve; Arabic: نورا تحلم) is a 2019 Tunisian drama film directed by Hinde Boujemaa and co-produced by Marie Besson, François d'Artemare, Tatjana Kozar, Imed Marzouk and Samuel Tilman for Propaganda Production. The film stars Hind Sabri in the titular lead role whereas Lotfi Abdelli, Hakim Boumsaoudi and Imen Cherif made supportive roles. It is a love triangle between Noura, Jamal and Lassad which is not lawful according to the Tunisian law which severely punishes adultery.

The film has been shot in Tunis, Tunisia. The film made its premier on 25 June 2020. The film received mixed reviews from critics.

== Cast ==
- Hind Sabri as Noura
- Lotfi Abdelli as Jamel
- Hakim Boumsaoudi as Lassaad
- Imen Cherif as Yoser
- Jamel Sassi as Hamadi - Corrupt Police Officer
- Seifeddine Dhrif as Mahmoud - Police Interrogator
- Belhassen Harbaoui as Belhassen
- Ikbel Harbaoui as Yosra
- Meriem Zitouni as Nadia
- Latifa Bida as Âalgia
- Moncef Ajengui as Mongi
- Achref Ben Youssef as Salah
- Fedi Kahlaoui as Khaled
- Linda Turki as Sarra
- Ons Ben Azouz as Landlord
