= Shereen Reda =

Egyptian actress (born 1968)

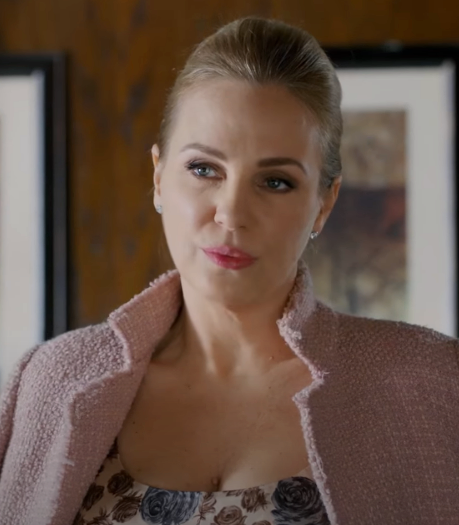
- Shereen Reda in 2016
- Born: Shereen Mahmoud Reda; July 7, 1968 (age 57); Cairo, Egypt
- Citizenship: Egyptian
- Occupation: Actress
- Father: Mahmoud Reda

Shereen Reda (Arabic: شيرين رضا; born July 7, 1968) is an Egyptian actress.

== Life ==
She is the daughter of the Egyptian dancer Mahmoud Reda and his second wife, a former Yugoslavian ballet dancer from present-day Serbia. She started working on television as a model for advertisements, then Fawazeer, then moved to acting.

She participated in many artistic works in the early nineties, the most important of which is the movie Hassan El-Lol with Ahmed Zaki, then she retired for a while and returned to art in 2006 through the movie Ashraf Haramy with Tamer Abdel Moneim and participated in 2007 in starring in an episode of the series Critical Moments, in addition to her participation in an episode of the series Ragel wa Set Setat and the program "Al-Tajriba".

=== Controversy ===
Her opinions sparked some angry responses from followers of Islam, with some describing her as anti-islamic, when she expressed her annoyance with the sound of the call to prayer and described it as “screaming” meaning an annoying sound, and her controversial comments concerning the ban of the band Mashrou' Leila from singing in Egypt. Conservative groups in the Egyptian society called herself a liar and hypocrite, as she said: "The Egyptian society is dishonest and hypocritical, I resort to lying sometimes despite my hatred for it to preserve the appearance of my family and my daughter."

== Filmography ==
=== Films (selection) ===
Year	Movie	Role	Ref
1996	Nazwa (نزوة)	Safa' (صفاء)	
1997	Hassan El-Lol (حسن اللول)	Fatima	
2018	Diamond Dust (تراب الماس)	Bushraa Sira	
2019	The Blue Elephant 2 (الفيل الأزرق 2 )	Deja	
2020	Luxor (الأقصر)	Dunia (دنيا)	
2024	Flight 404 (رحلة 404)		

=== TV series (selection) ===
Year	Series	Role	Ref
2007	Critical Moments (لحظات حرجة)	Guest	
2009	Ragel Wa Sitt Settat (4th) (راجل وست ستات)	Guest	
