= Hesham Nazih =

Egyptian composer (born 1972)

Hesham Nazih هشام نزيه
- Born: 23 October 1972 (age 53); Port Said, Egypt
- Genres: Egyptian music
- Occupations: composer; actor
- Years active: 1998–present
- Website: hesham-nazih.com

Hesham Nazih, also spelled Hesham Nazeh (Arabic: هشام نزيه, born on 23 October 1972) is an Egyptian composer, musician and actor.

== Early life and career ==
Nazih graduated from the Faculty of Engineering, Cairo University in 1998. During his graduation year, he composed the soundtrack for the Egyptian film Hysteria starring actor Ahmed Zaki.

Nazih is best known for scoring numerous Egyptian features and TV shows, like The Blue Elephant, Ibrahim Labyad, Tito, The Blue Elephant 2 and Sons of Rizk.

He has since composed the soundtracks for many Egyptian films. In 2019, he composed the music for the British-drama film Born a King. His most notable and celebrated work is the soundtrack for Egypt's Pharaohs' Golden Parade in 2021. Additionally, in 2022, he composed the soundtrack for the Marvel Studios series Moon Knight.

== Honors and awards ==
Nazih's work for the Egyptian movie, El Asliyyin in 2017, brought him the Best Music award at the Cairo National Festival for Egyptian Cinema in 2018, he was also awarded the Faten Hamama Excellence Award at the 40th Cairo International Film Festival in the same year.
