= Layla Taj =

American-born belly dancer who promotes Egyptian culture

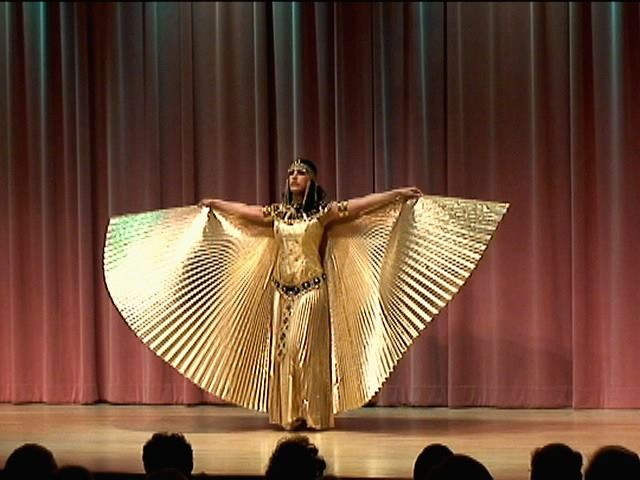
- Taj in an Ancient Egyptian ensemble performing at the Gold Hall Theater, New York
- Occupations: Belly dancer, choreographer
- Years active: 1999–present
- Height: 172.72 cm (5 ft 8 in)
- Career
- Dances: Raqs al-sharqi Egyptian folklore Pharonic

Layla Taj (Arabic: ليلى تاج) is an American belly dancer in the classical Egyptian raqs al-sharqi style. The focus of her repertoire is to communicate facets of Egyptian culture.

== Early life and training ==
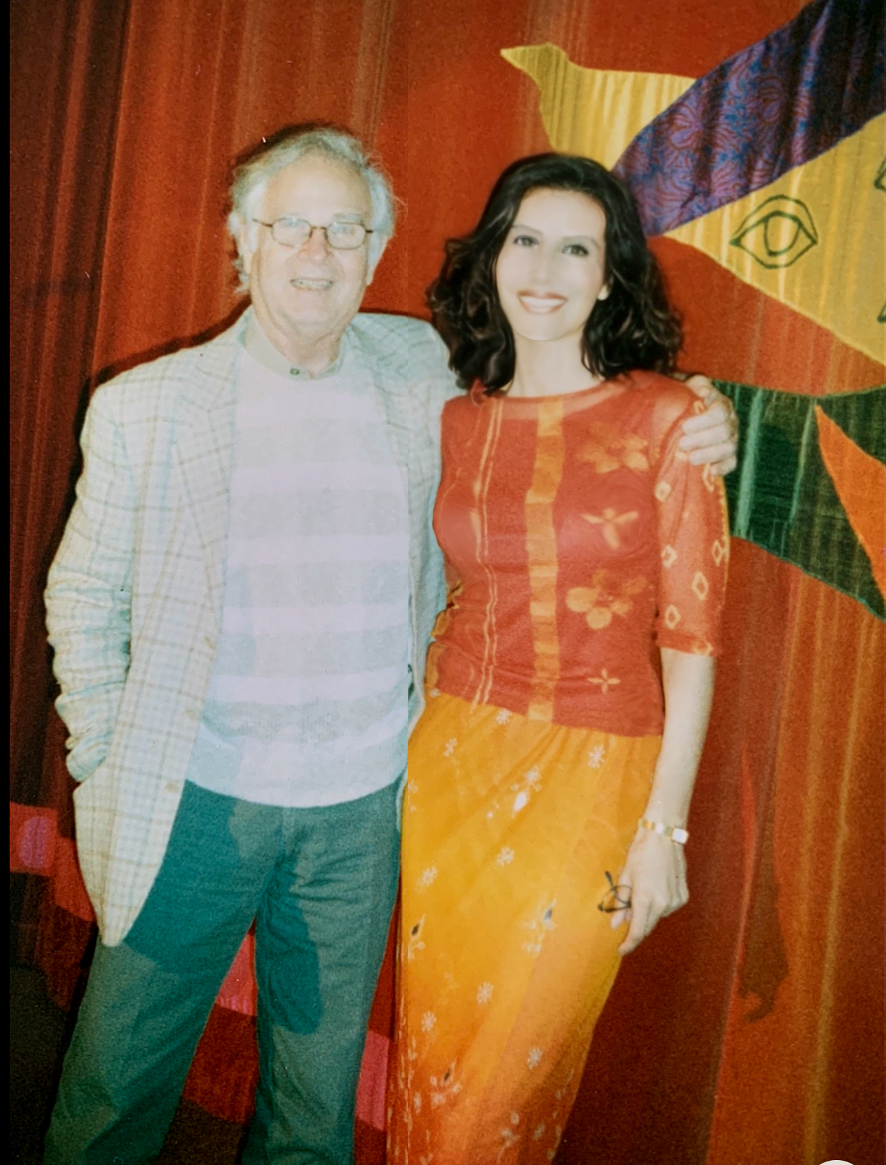
Egyptian Belly Dancer Layla Taj performs in Gala Show and studies with master teacher Mahmoud Reda

Taj descends from a long line of aristocratic Greek Athenians and Egyptiotes (Greek: Αιγυπτιώτες). Her mother was a beauty queen who won the national pageant sponsored by the Greek-American Progressive Association (GAPA).

Taj initially trained in ballet. She was introduced to Middle Eastern dance in childhood. Later, as she developed her professional career, Taj trained in belly dance in the United States and Germany, where she studied with Mahmoud Reda, Raqia Hassan and Mo Geddawi of the Reda Troup.

== Career ==
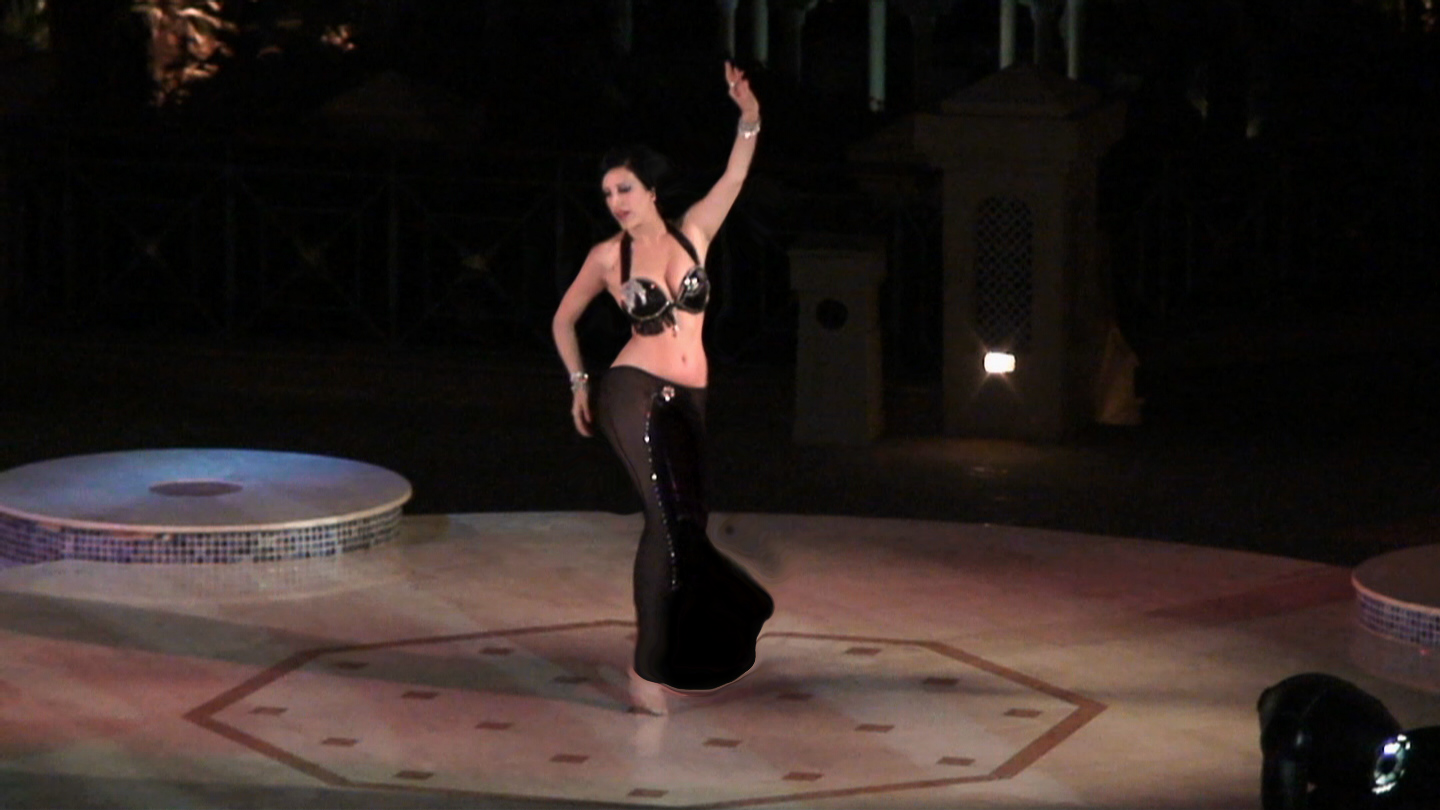
Taj performs at the Hyatt Regency Resort, Sharm El Sheikh, Egypt.

Taj has been contracted as an in-house solo Egyptian belly dancer throughout the Middle East, including Tunisia, the United Arab Emirates, and Egypt, where cultural and legal norms have been selective regarding who is eligible to perform. In Egypt, Taj has been contracted as the principal belly dancer at venues in Sharm El Sheikh and Cairo. Taj's audiences have included dignitaries such as politicians (including Egyptian Ambassador Youssef Zada) and Middle Eastern royalty. Outside of the Middle East, she has been selected to perform at events sponsored by the United Nations and by the Egyptian Tourism Authority. In 2009, Taj performed in New York City in an educational cultural program sponsored by the World Heritage Cultural Center. Taj also performed at the high-profile wedding celebration of Middle-Eastern author and publisher Yara Michaels and ophthalmologist David W. Shoemaker that took place at Cà d’Zan at the John and Mable Ringling Museum of Art. Taj focuses on belly dance as being an artistic medium through which to communicate features of Egyptian culture. Taj rejects the floorwork that is common in other approaches (such as the Turkish style), believing the upright posture of the classical Egyptian genre to be more culturally representative. Her interpretation of musical accompaniment is influenced by the vocal style of the late Egyptian singer and actress Umm Kulthum.

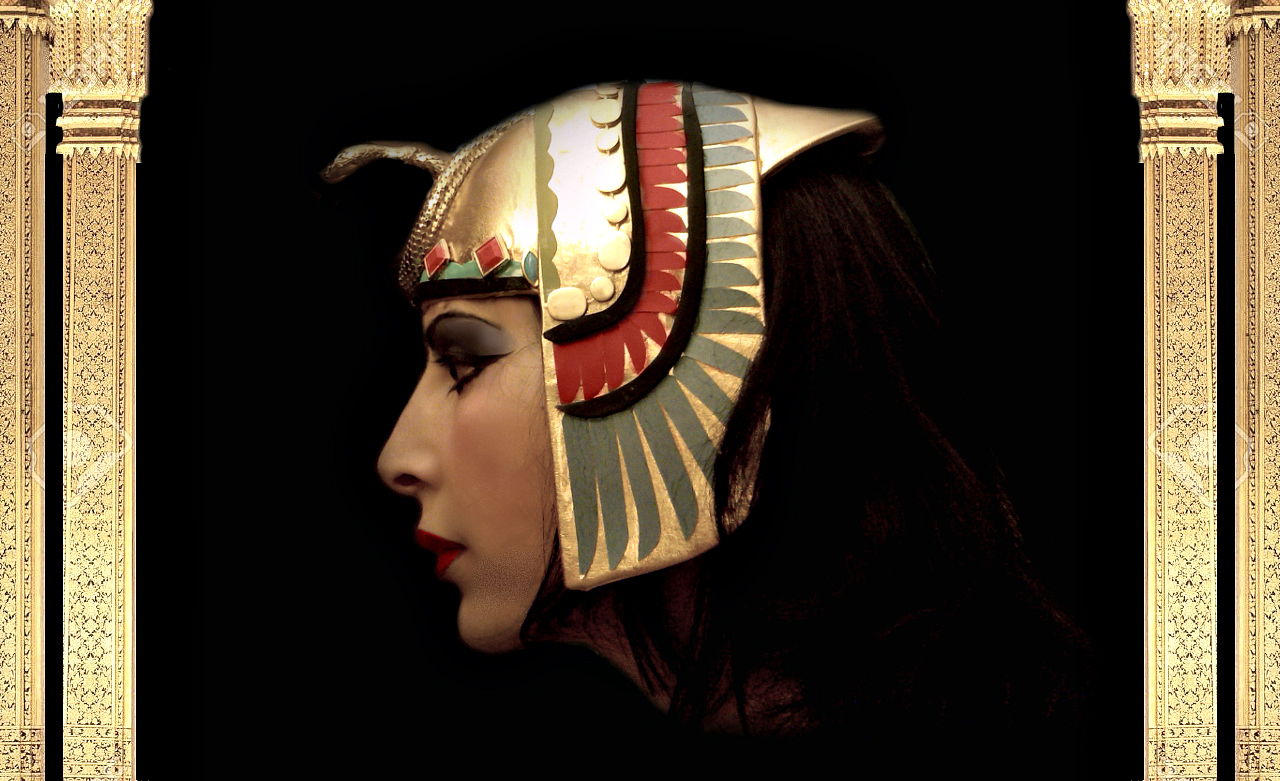
Taj portrays Cleopatra VII in Journey Down the Nile

Taj performs through The Egyptian Cultural Performing Arts Society, whose mission is to educate the public about Egyptian culture. The mainstay of Taj's repertoire for the organization is Journey Down the Nile, a multi-media Egyptian cultural program which consists of regional dances of Egypt interspersed with film clips that explain them. The program's primary dance is Wings of Isis, in which Taj portrays Cleopatra and illustrates the queen's identification with the goddess Isis. In her work, Taj also portrays Queen Nefertiti of the 18th Dynasty of Ancient Egypt. In addition to performing the cultural program live, Taj also developed and performs in the educational short film, Ancient and Modern Dances of Egypt.

Taj's repertoire also includes a portrayal of another powerful woman, Salome. Taj performs Salome's Dance of the Seven Veils, described in Matthew 14 in the New Testament.

Taj is a contributor to Bennu, the publication of the Associated Artists of Middle Eastern Dance (ASAmed). She has written about her career experiences in Berlin and Stockholm, including her contributions to the first Stockholm belly dance festival known as The Nile Group. Her 2015 essay, The Difference Between Art and Entertainment, is a component of the dance curriculum at Brigham Young University.

Before developing her dance career, Taj was a recording artist with a single that hit the Billboard charts.

== See also ==
- List of dancers
