= Hinde Boujemaa =

Belgian-Tunisian film director and screenwriter

- هند بوجمعة
- Occupation: Film director

Hinde Boujemaa (Arabic: هند بوجمعة, romanized: Hind Būjumʻah) is a half-Tunisian, half-Belgian film director.

== Life ==
Boujemaa did a degree in marketing, worked in makeup and special effects, and brought up children before starting her career in filmmaking. In 2006 she studied scriptwriting in a French correspondence course school, and in 2009 wrote a feature film, Under Paradise, which won the Sud Ecriture prize at the Carthage Film Festival. She has said that the Tunisian Revolution was responsible for her own "personal revolution", giving her the inspiration to pursue filmmaking for herself.

Boujemaa's documentary It Was Better Tomorrow follows the life of a young woman in Tunis trying to care for her children after the Tunisian Revolution. Her 2019 feature film Noura's Dream portrays a woman (played by Hend Sabri) who is caught between her husband and her lover. The film premiered at Toronto International Film Festival.

== Films ==
- C'était mieux demain / It Was Better Tomorrow, 2012
- And Romeo Married Juliette, 2014
- Noura's Dream, 2019
