= The Blue Elephant =

- Theatrical release poster
- Directed by: Marwan Hamed
- Written by: Ahmed Mourad
- Based on: The Blue Elephant
- Produced by: Fadi Fahim; Omar Sallam
- Starring: Karim Abdel Aziz; Khaled El Sawy; Nelly Karim; Mohamed Mamdouh; Dareen Haddad; Shereen Reda; Mohamed Shahin; Lebleba
- Cinematography: Ahmed El Morsi
- Edited by: Mohamed Attia
- Music by: Hesham Nazih
- Distributed by: Arabia Cinema Production & Distribution (ACPD)
- Release date: July 28, 2014
- Running time: 170 minutes
- Country: Egypt
- Language: Egyptian Arabic

The Blue Elephant (Arabic: الفيل الأزرق, romanized: Al Fil Al Azraq) is a 2014 Egyptian drama/horror/mystery film produced and directed by Marwan Hamed in Cairo, Egypt. The story was originally translated into film from a 2012 Arabic novel written by the famous Egyptian writer Ahmed Mourad, and starring Egyptian actors Karim Abdel Aziz, Khaled El Sawy and Nelly Karim. The film talks about a man called Yehia, who unwillingly comes out of isolation after five years, to resume his service in El-Abbaseya psychiatric hospital, where he is in charge of evaluating the mental health of the criminally insane. It was followed by a sequel The Blue Elephant 2 (Arabic: 2 الفيل الأزرق, translit. Al Fil Al Azraq 2) released in 2019.

According to Ahmed Mourad, writer of the Arabic novel, the book and the film hold two different endings. Director Marwan Hamed proposed a change in the closing scene of the movie to allow the film to adapt and satisfy a large mass of audience.

The Blue Elephant received mixed reviews but performed well in the Egyptian Box-office during Eid time. The film did not follow the formula of the recent slew of Egyptian comedies, yet it managed to win over audiences across the Arab region. The film gained up to 30 million Egyptian pounds, which is approximately 4.2 million U.S. Dollars. As of 2024, it is the 12th highest rated horror film on IMDb with a rating of 8.0.

== Plot ==
Psychiatrist Dr. Yehia Rashed (Karim Abdel Aziz) returns to his job five years after the death of his loving wife and daughter. Filled with grief for his loss, Yehia resorts himself to drugs, drinking and gambling. But then he receives a warning from work and returns to his duties in El-Abbaseya psychiatric hospital where he is assigned 8 Gharb, a special department for mental patients who are also criminals. There, a surprise awaits him that turns his life upside down. Yehia's return coincides with the arrival of a former old psychiatrist friend, Sherif Al Kordy (Khaled El Sawy), a patient accused of brutally killing his wife. Hoping to find out the truth behind Sherif's case, Yehia begins a journey of locating clues, investigating the crime scene and gathering as much information from Sherif's younger sister Lobna (Nelly Karim), Yehia's first true love. While he tries to unravel the many mysteries surrounding his friend, Dr. Yehia gets sucked into a sea of hallucinations, magic spells, numbers and demons, swirling around a tattoo parlor and a blue pill that bears the print of a six-legged elephant. For Yehia, the secrets behind the pill The Blue Elephant helped him enter the gateway of another world to uncover the demonic sources behind Sherif's crime.

== Cast ==
- Karim Abdel Aziz as Dr. Yehia Rashed
- Khaled El Sawy as Sherif Al Kordy also as Na'el
- Nelly Karim as Lobna
- Mohamed Mamdouh as Dr. Sameh
- Dareen Haddad as Maya
- Lebleba as Dr. Safaa
- Shereen Reda as Deega
- Mohamed Shahin as Shaker
- Yvesson as founder Blue Elephant

== Production ==
Director Marwan Hamed said "I read the novel in one day, and I thought it was amazing we do not do thrillers and fantasy films in Egypt and I love these genres so I thought this could be the one. I felt very sorry for the characters, especially Yehia Rahed, the main character. I always thought that “The Blue Elephant” is about performance. I love working with actors and all the characters and their back-stories were really quite interesting. One of the things that grabbed me most was the other world in the film and the journeys that Yehia took."

Thanks to the support from:

1. Al Shorouk for Media Productions.
2. Albatross Production Company.
3. Lighthouse Films.

The movie was successfully produced. The three production companies also contributed with "Arabia Cinema Production & Distribution" to help distribute the movie worldwide. The Film The Blue Elephant, First got released on the 28th of July, 2014 in Egypt. A month later on Eid al-Fitr 14 August 2014 the movie was available for viewers in countries such as (United Arab Emirates, Kuwait and Bahrain)

== Reception ==
Critic Mahmoud Mahdy of FilmGamed rated it 8 out of 10 and wrote: "The Blue Elephant is a cinematic achievement that should've paved the way for more courage and further adventures by Egyptian filmmakers."

== Accolades ==
The 14th edition of the Marrakech International Film Festival - December 5 to 13, 2014
International Prize for Arabic Fiction - 10 February 2014

== Marketing ==
The Film has been successfully distributed with the help of "Arabia Cinema Production & Distribution (ACPD)" in Egypt.
