= Marwan Hamed =

Egyptian film director (born 1977)

- Born: 4 April 1977 (age 49); Cairo, Egypt
- Occupation: film director
- Parents: Wahid Hamed (father); Zeinab Sweidan (mother)

Marwan Hamed (Arabic: مروان حامد; born April 4, 1977) is an Egyptian film director. He is the son of author Wahid Hamed and journalist Zeinab Sweidan. His debut was a short film entitled Li Li followed by a major feature film entitled The Yacoubian Building based on a novel by Alaa Al Aswany and starring Nour El Sherif and Adel Emam.

He has taken part in direction of the series Lahzat Harija and has filmed a music video for Amr Diab.

The Yacoubian Building was followed by Ibrahim Labyad starring Ahmed El-Sakka and Hend Sabry and was released in 2009. Then he released The Blue Elephant starring actor Karim Abdel Aziz and Khaled Al Sawy, and is based on Ahmed Mourad's novel of the same name. In 2017 he released The Originals starting Khaled el Sawy, Maged el Kedwany and Menna Shalby.

In 2026 edition of the International Film Festival Rotterdam a retrospective for Hamed, as one of its Focus strands in celebration of his prolific career will be featured along with European premiere of his 2025 film El Sett, a biopic of Egyptian singer and actress Umm Kulthum.

== Filmography ==
- 2025: El Sett
- 2022: Kira Wel Gen
- 2019: The Blue Elephant 2
- 2018: Diamond Dust
- 2017: The Originals
- 2014: The Blue Elephant
- 2009: Ibrahim Labyad
- 2006: The Yacoubian Building
