= Lee Stack =

British Army officer and administrator (1868–1924)

Major-General Sir Lee Stack GBE CMG
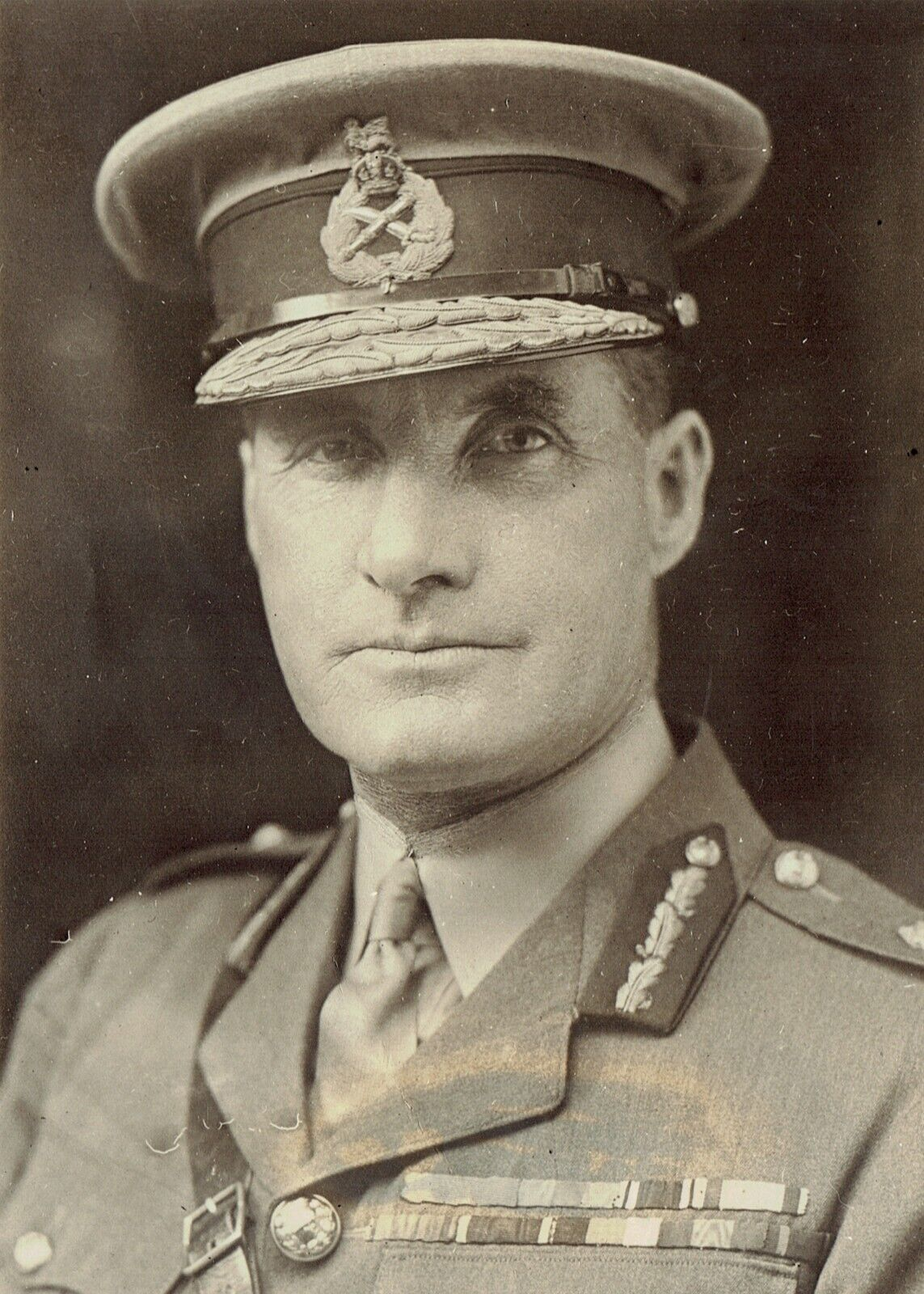
- Stack in c. 1924

Governor-General of Sudan
- In office 1917 – 19 November 1924
- Preceded by: Reginald Wingate
- Succeeded by: Geoffrey Francis Archer

Personal details
- Born: 15 May 1868 Darjeeling, India
- Died: 20 November 1924 (aged 56) Cairo, Kingdom of Egypt

Military service
- Branch/service: British Army
- Years of service: 1888–1924
- Rank: Major-General

Major-General Sir Lee Oliver Fitzmaurice Stack (15 May 1868 – 20 November 1924) was a British Army officer and Governor-General of the Anglo-Egyptian Sudan. On 19 November 1924, he was shot by assassins while driving through Cairo, and died of his wounds the next day.

== Early life ==
Born in Darjeeling, India, Lee Stack was the son of the British Inspector-General of Police for Bengal. He was educated at Clifton College and the Royal Military College, Sandhurst.

== Career ==
After service with the British Army, Major Lee Stack was seconded to the Egyptian Army in 1899. In addition to regimental appointments he served as Military Secretary to General Sir Reginald Wingate. He received the Order of Osmanieh, third class, from the Khedive of Egypt in 1902. Stack left the army in 1910 but took up the position of Civil Secretary of the Sudan in 1913, based in Khartoum. On the outbreak of war in 1914 he was granted the temporary rank of lieutenant-colonel, and in 1917 that of major-general when he became Sirdar of the Egyptian Army, combining this appointment with that of Governor General of the Sudan.

== Assassination ==
On 19 November 1924, Sir Lee Stack, accompanied by an aide de camp, was being driven from the Egyptian War Office in Cairo to his official residence. His car had halted in heavy traffic to give a tram car right of way when several Egyptian students, grouped on the pavement, fired a volley of revolver shots into the vehicle. Stack's driver, Frederick Hamilton March, although injured, was able to accelerate the car away from the scene of the shooting and reach the nearby residence of the British High Commissioner to Egypt. Major-General Stack suffered wounds to the hand, stomach, and foot. He died the next day.

== Aftermath ==
The British High Commissioner, Field Marshal Lord Allenby, responded with anger, presenting a list of demands to the Egyptian government which included a public apology, an inquiry, suppression of demonstrations and payment of a fine. Furthermore, he demanded withdrawal of all Egyptian officers and Egyptian army units from the Sudan, an increase to the scope of an irrigation scheme in Gezira and laws to protect foreign investors in Egypt.

Seven men convicted of involvement in the assassination were executed by hanging in 1925. Several were identified by a taxi driver whose vehicle they had commandeered to escape from the scene. The pistols used were identified through a pioneering instance of bullet examination by forensic scientist Sydney Smith.

Sir Geoffrey Archer, formerly Governor of Uganda, took over as Governor-General of the Sudan in January 1925, the first time a civilian had held this office.

Military offices
| Preceded by Sir Reginald Wingate | Sirdar of the Egyptian Army; 1916–1924 | Succeeded by Sir Charlton Spinks |
Political offices
| Preceded by Sir Reginald Wingate | Governor-General of the Sudan; 1916–1924 | Succeeded by Sir Geoffrey Archer |
