= Sirdar =

Commander-in-Chief of the Egyptian Army in the 19th-20th centuries

Commander-in-Chief of the Royal Egyptian Army
- Sirdar
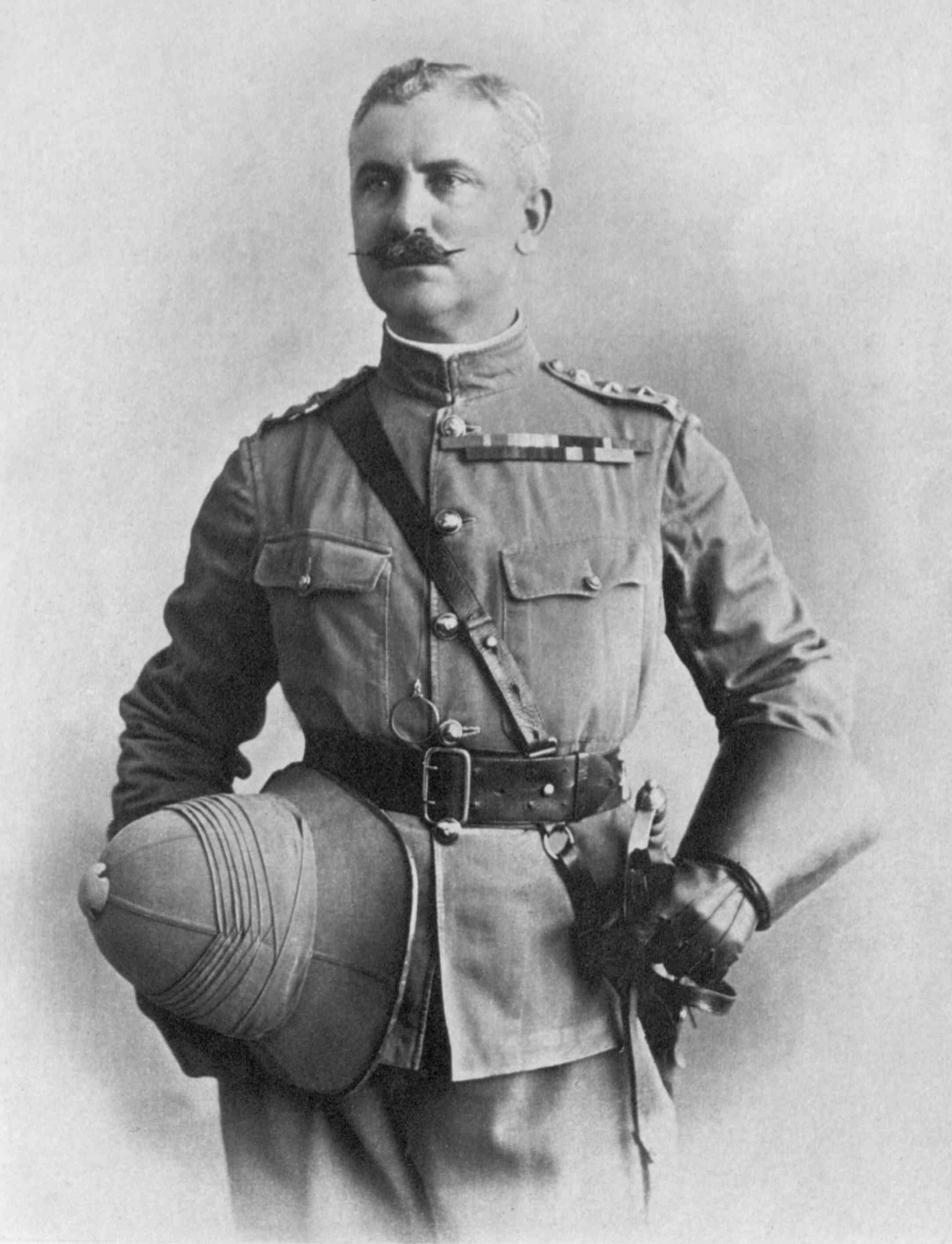
- Longest serving Sir Reginald Wingate; 1899–1916
- Residence: Sirdaria
- Formation: 21 December 1882
- First holder: Sir Evelyn Wood
- Final holder: Sir Charlton Spinks
- Abolished: 12 January 1937
- Superseded by: Chief of the General Staff

The rank of sirdar (Arabic: سردار) – a variant of sardar – was assigned to the British commander-in-chief of the British-controlled Egyptian Army in the late 19th and early 20th centuries. The sirdar resided at the Sirdaria, a three-block-long property in Zamalek which was also the home of British military intelligence in Egypt.

== List of officeholders ==
No.	Portrait	Name (birth–death)	Term of office			Ref.
No.	Portrait	Name (birth–death)	Took office	Left office	Time in office	Ref.
1	Sir Evelyn Wood	Sir Evelyn Wood (1838–1919)	21 December 1882	31 March 1885	2 years, 100 days	
2	Lord Grenfell	Lord Grenfell (1841–1925)	19 April 1886	12 April 1892	5 years, 359 days	
3	Lord Kitchener	Lord Kitchener (1850–1916)	13 April 1892	1899	6–7 years	
4	Sir Reginald Wingate	Sir Reginald Wingate (1861–1953)	1899	1916	16–17 years	–
5	Sir Lee Stack	Sir Lee Stack (1868–1924)	1916	20 November 1924 †	7–8 years	–
6	Sir Charlton Spinks	Sir Charlton Spinks (1877–1959)	November 1924	12 January 1937	12 years, 2 months	–
