= Frederick Hamilton March =

Australian soldier, Recipient of the Empire Gallantry Medal

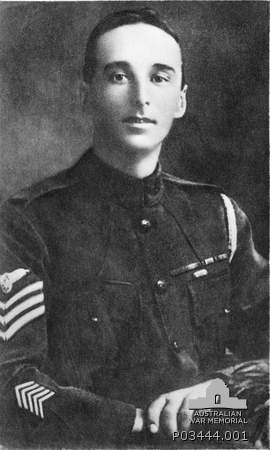
- Sergeant Frederick March c.1919
- Born: 6 August 1891; Bowning, New South Wales, Australia
- Died: 30 October 1977 (aged 86); Khartoum, Sudan
- Military career
- Allegiance: Australia
- Branch: Australian Imperial Force
- Service years: 1915–1919
- Rank: Sergeant
- Unit: 7th Light Horse Regiment
- Conflicts: First World War; Sinai and Palestine Campaign
- Awards: George Cross; Member of the Order of the British Empire
- Other work: Chauffeur

Frederick Hamilton March, GC, MBE (6 August 1891 – 30 October 1977) was an Australian soldier and adventurer. He served in the Middle East during the First World War. He received the Empire Gallantry Medal, then the highest civilian gallantry award in the British Empire, for his conduct during the assassination of the Governor-General of Sudan, Sir Lee Stack. He was involved with the Sudanese Ministry of Agriculture during his later working career.

== Early life and First World War ==
March was born at Bowning, New South Wales. His parents were from Gundaroo. He claimed that he ran away from his home, and stowed away on a ship sailing from Sydney to San Francisco. In the United States, he worked with General Motors in Detroit, Michigan. Before the First World War, he returned to New South Wales. He was employed as a picture show man. He also ran hire cars at Moss Vale.

When the First World War started, March enlisted as a private in the Australian Imperial Force (AIF) in September 1915, giving his occupation as chauffeur. He served in the Middle East with the 7th Light Horse Regiment. He was discharged from the AIF in 1919 in Egypt, having achieved the rank of sergeant. After the war, he never returned to his home country.

== Post-war career ==
March worked as a chauffeur to Sir Lee Stack, the Governor-General of the Anglo-Egyptian Sudan. On 19 November 1924, Stack was shot and assassinated. March was also wounded, but he evaded a second hail of bullets by skillful driving. He was awarded the Empire Gallantry Medal (EGM) from King George V. On the publication of the warrant creating the George Cross (GC) by King George VI, in January 1941, all holders of the EGM were instructed to return that medal, and it was replaced by the GC. He received compensation money for his wounds, and he bought a garage in Cairo with that money.

March worked on military road-building projects in Sinai and Palestine in the Second World War. He lost contact with his family after the death of his mother in 1948. He was involved with the Sudanese Ministry of Agriculture for the rest of his working life. He received the Queen's Silver Jubilee Medal in 1977. He died on 30 October 1977. He was buried in the Christian cemetery in Khartoum. In 1978, he was reburied in the adjacent Commonwealth War Graves Commission cemetery at the insistence of the Returned and Services League of Australia.
