= Deir el-Shelwit =

Archaeological site in Egypt

Coordinates: 25.6952°N 32.5784°E

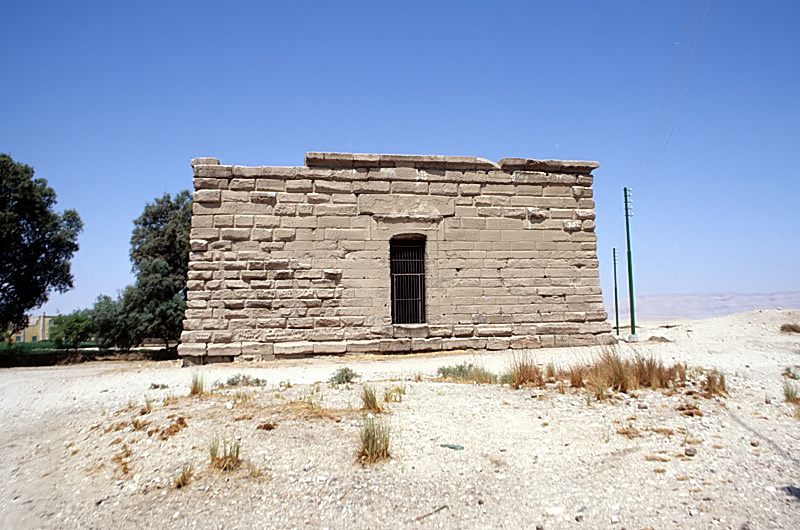
The temple in August 2000

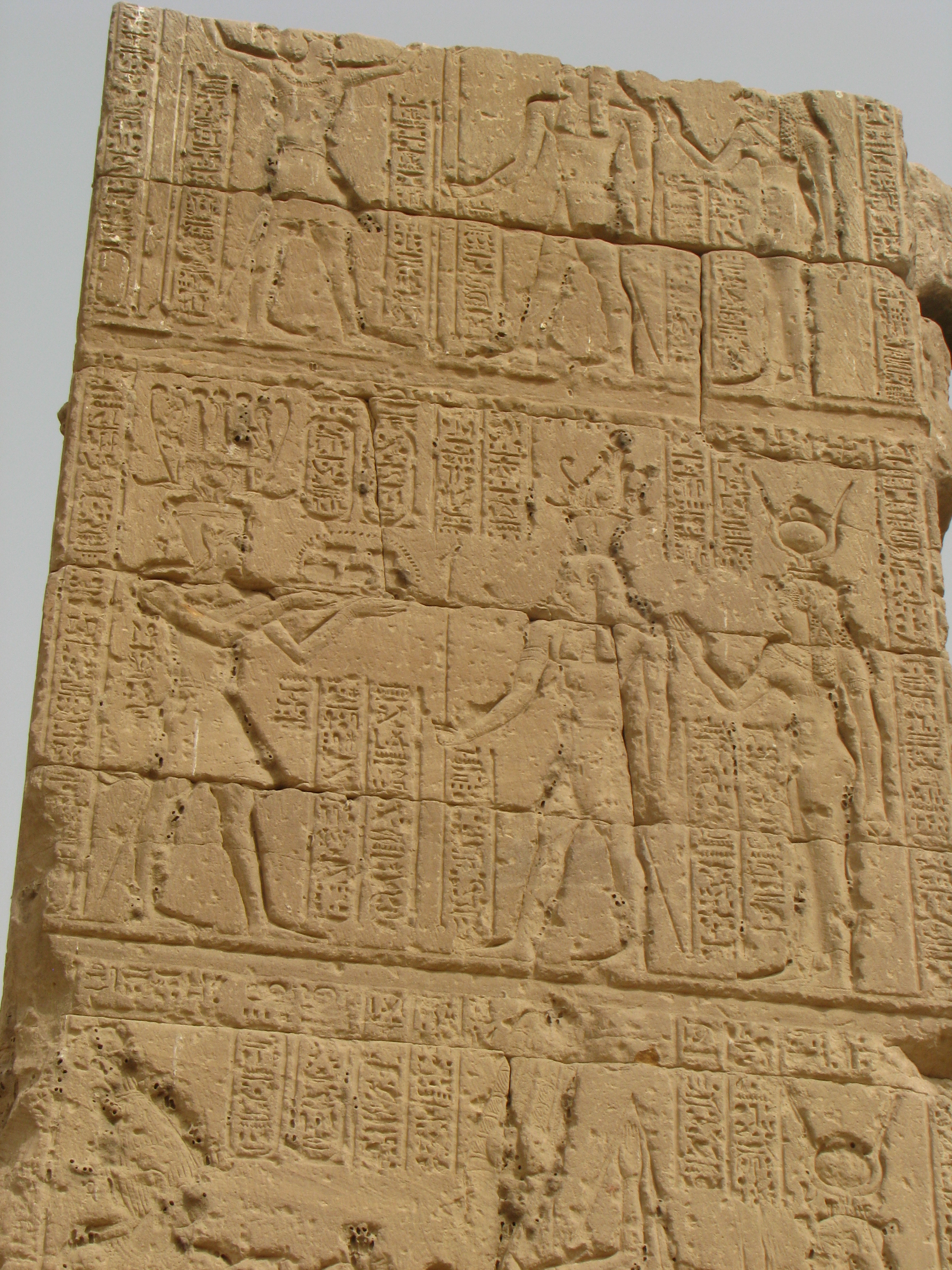
Reliefs on the propylon

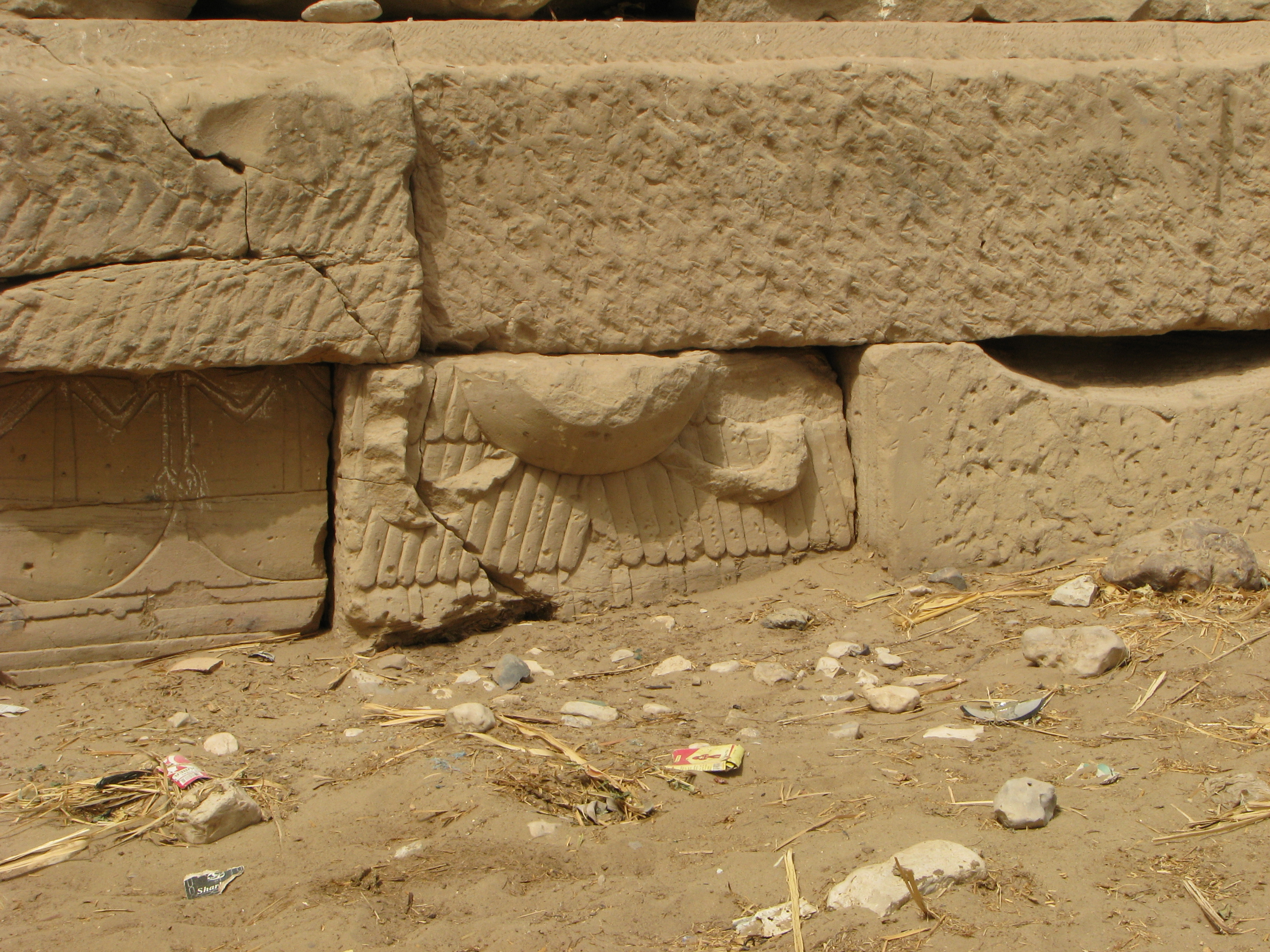
Reused blocks (possibly of Medinet Habu) at the southern wall

Deir el-Shelwit (Arabic: دير الشلويط; French: Deir Chelouit) is an Egyptian temple built during the Greco-Roman period. Dedicated to Isis, a major goddess in the Egyptian religion, the temple stands on the west bank of the Nile at the city of Luxor, roughly 1 km (0.62 mi) from Malkata and about 4 km (2.5 mi) south of Medinet Habu.

According to inscriptions on the propylon, construction of the Isis temple began around the early 1st century CE. No earlier building is known to have stood on this site. The reliefs of the temple are similar to the ones at Dendera and Philae. On the walls of the temple and the pylon, there are cartouches of the Roman emperors Hadrian, Antoninus Pius, Galba, Otho, Vespasian, and of the Roman dictator Julius Caesar.

== Remains ==
Today all that remains of the temple is its small main building and ruins of the propylon, along with its brick enclosure wall and the well. The temple precinct had an area of 78×58 metres; the temple itself is much smaller, with an area of 13×16 m. Its entrance faces south. The outer walls do not have much decoration but on the inside the reliefs are well preserved. The shrine is surrounded by a corridor from which side chapels and a wabet (place of cleansing) open; also the stairs lead to the roof from this corridor. On the southern side of the outer wall some stone blocks from earlier buildings had been reused, judging from the reliefs on them most of them appear to be from Medinet Habu.

The propylon is located 60 meters east from the temple, and is lavishly decorated on all sides.

The importance of the Isis temple of Deir el-Shelwit is because Graeco-Roman era religious buildings are rare in this area, and this is the only one not associated with the Theban Triad but with Isis.

== History ==
According to inscriptions on the propylon, construction of the Isis temple started around the beginning of 1st century CE. No earlier building is known to have stood on this site. According to one theory the temple's construction started under the reign of Nectanebo II and reached its finished form during the Greek-Roman era.

== Excavation ==
The temple was first examined by Karl Richard Lepsius in the mid-19th century, but he did not make a detailed description of it. A French expedition led by Christiane Zivie studied the inscriptions on the propylon and published their studies in 1992. Between 1971 and 1979 archaeologists from the Waseda University of Japan worked on the site, they cleared the enclosure wall and the enclosed precinct from debris and excavated the temple's well which was filled with pottery sherds. Thirty-two strata of fillings were detected in the well, up to the point of 4 meters under ground level, where water made further excavation impossible. Remains found in the well prove that the well (and the temple itself) was already abandoned and used as a trash deposit by the Coptic era.

== Decoration ==
The reliefs of the temple are dated to the Greek-Roman era and are similar to the ones in Dendera and Philae. On the walls of the temple and the pylon there are the cartouches of Hadrianus, Antoninus Pius, Galba, Otho, Vespasianus and Julius Caesar. On the reused blocks built into the outer walls of the temple, reliefs stylistically dated to the New Kingdom can be seen.

== See also ==
- List of ancient Egyptian sites, including sites of temples
- Luxor Temple
