= Khaled Fahmy =

Egyptian historian

- خالد فهمي
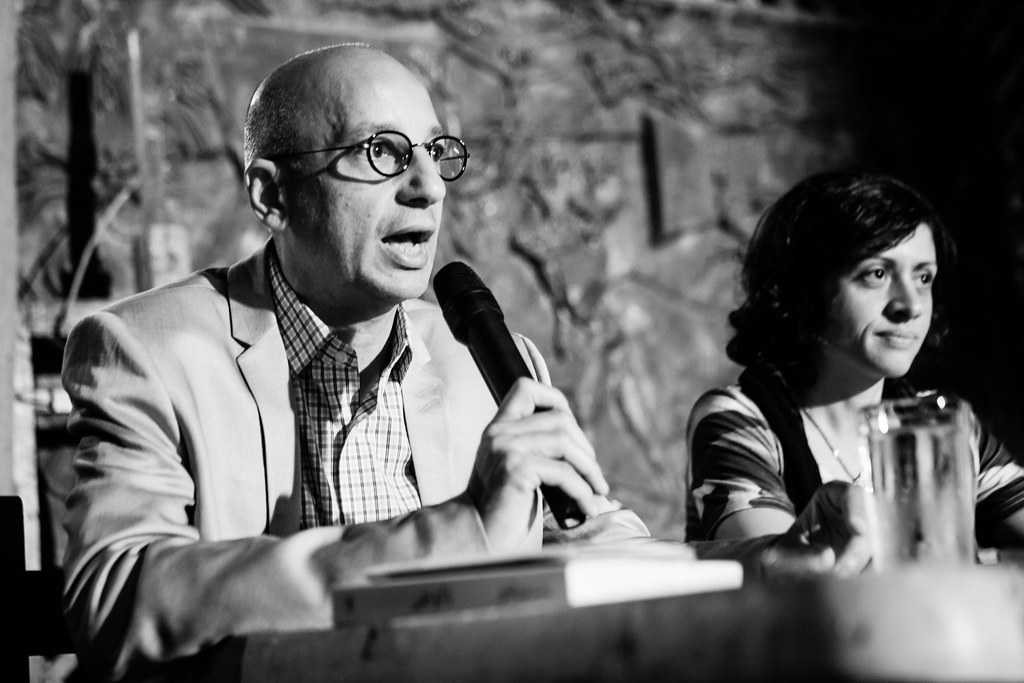
- Khaled Fahmy in Cairo, 2014
- Born: April 25, 1964 (age 62); Egypt
- Citizenship: Egyptian
- Education: American University in Cairo University of Cambridge
- Occupation: History Professor
- Years active: 1997–
- Notable work: All the Pasha's Men: Mehmed Ali: His Army and the Making of Modern Egypt

Khaled Fahmy (Arabic: خالد فهمي) is an historian and the Edward Keller Professor of North Africa and the Middle East at Tufts University.

== Biography ==
In 2010, Fahmy returned to Egypt where he was a professor in the Department of History at the American University in Cairo. In 2014-2015 he was an Arcapita Visiting Professor at the Middle East Institute, Columbia University. In 2015-2016 he was the Shawwaf Visiting Professor in Modern Middle East History at Harvard University. After serving as His Majesty Sultan Qaboos Bin Sa’id Professor of Modern Arabic Studies, and a Fellow of King’s College, Cambridge, he moved to Tufts University in 2022.

== Publications ==
Fahmy's dissertation on the social history of the army of Mehmed Ali Pasha was later published by Cambridge University Press under the title All the Pasha's Men: Mehmed Ali: His Army and the Making of Modern Egypt. An Arabic translation was published by Dar al-Shorouk. This was followed by a Turkish translation published by Bilgi University Press under the title Paşa'nın Adamları:Kavalalı Mehmed Ali Paşa, Ordu ve Modern Mısır.

Fahmy also wrote a biography of Mehmed Ali Pasha that appeared in the Makers of the Muslim World Series published by Oneworld Publications under the title of Mehmed Ali: From Ottoman Governor to Ruler of Egypt. He published a collection of articles in Arabic on the history of law and medicine in nineteenth-century that appeared under the title " الجسد والحداثة: الطب والقانون في مصر الحديثة" .

In 2019, he published In Quest of Justice: Islamic Law and Forensic Medicine in Modern Egypt, which was the winner of the 2020 Social History Society Book Prize.
