= Ahmed Mourad =

Egyptian author and screenwriter

- أحمد مراد
- Born: February 14, 1978 (age 48); Egypt
- Known for: Writing
- Website: Ahmed Mourad at IMDb

Ahmed Mourad (Arabic: أحمد مراد; born February 14, 1978) is an Egyptian author and screenwriter of fiction and non-fiction.

== Writings ==
=== Vertigo ===
Mourad's work came in the year of 2007, when he wrote his first novel, Vertigo (Arabic: فيرتيجو), published in the same year by Dar Merit. A tense thriller that reveals contemporary Egypt and Cairo's seedy nightlife, it tells the story of a photographer in a high-class Cairo nightclub who witnesses his friend being murdered in a fight between rival young businessmen.

The novel was translated into three languages by different publishing houses, in 2011. It was translated into English by Bloomsbury, Italian by Marsilio, and French by Groupe Flammarion.

Then the novel was made into a TV show during the month of Ramadan of 2012 with the title: Vertigo (Arabic: فيرتيجو) starring Hend Sabry. The novel won the Mediterranean award in 2013 from Italy.

=== Diamond Dust ===
Mourad published his second novel, Diamond Dust (Arabic: تراب الماس) in February, 2010, which was translated into Italian by Marsilio Editore. It was adapted into a movie in 2018 with the same name, Turab el Mass, starring Asser Yassin and Menna Shalaby, and directed by Marwan Hamed.

The story begins with the protagonist Taha who is living a normal boring life, and works as a medical representative at a pharmaceuticals company. Until a mysterious murder occurs that changed his entire life.

=== The Blue Elephant ===
Mourad's breakthrough novel, The Blue Elephant (Arabic: الفيل الأزرق) published in October, 2012, which became the best-selling novel in Cairo International Book Fair in 2013. A year later, it was shortlisted for the Arabic Booker award in 2014.

A story about a psychiatrist named Yehia who returns to his job in El-Abbaseya hospital after five years of drop-out to find that his college mate Sherif just arrived for mental and psychological evaluation for being accused of murdering his own wife. Trying to help him, Yehia unravels mysteries he never thought existed in this world.

Later, it was made into a theatrical movie, The Blue Elephant (Arabic: الفيل الأزرق) starring Karim Abdel Aziz, Khaled El Sawy and Nelly Karim.

=== Other works ===
Other works are the novel 1919, published in 2014 and The Land of God (Arabic: أرض الإله), published in 2015.

Mourad is the screenwriter of The Originals (Arabic: الأصليين), also directed by Marwan Hamed. Mourad was initially going to write it as a novel before he decided to make it as a theatrical film. The film was published on June 25, 2017 across Egypt to a mixed critical reception from audiences and critics. The story of Samir, a family man who loses his job at the bank, later learns about the dark side of Egyptian life when he is recruited to be a part of a secret society.

== Former jobs ==
Murad was one of the personal photographers of former President Hosni Mubarak.

== Education ==
Mourad attended the High Institute of Cinema, graduating with a degree in cinematography. His graduation projects achieved awards in European film festivals. His projects include Alhaúmon, And on the Seventh Day, and The Three Papers, all of which were produced before his writing career.

== Published works ==
=== List ===
- Vertigo
- Diamond Dust
- The Blue Elephant
- 1919
- The Land of God
- Deer Hunting Season
- Auberge du Puits de Chauve-Souris
- sphinx

== See also ==
- List of Egyptian writers
