= Karim Abdel Aziz =

Egyptian actor (born 1975)

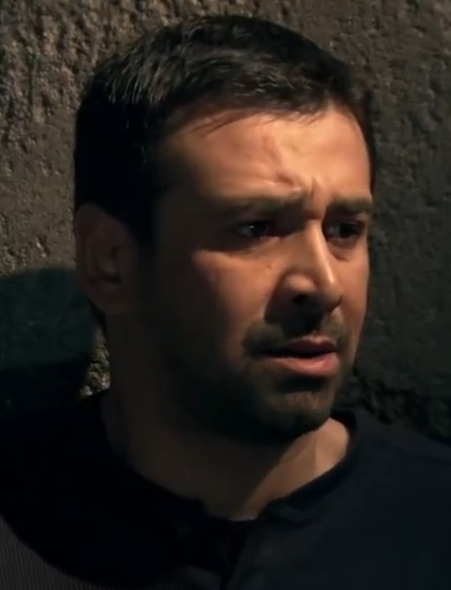
- Born: Karim Abdel Aziz; 17 August 1975 (age 51); Agouza, Giza, Egypt
- Occupation: Actor
- Years active: 1978–present
- Spouse: Heidy Sorour (m. 2005)
- Children: 2

Karim Abdel Aziz (Arabic: كريم عبد العزيز; born 17 August 1975) is an Egyptian actor and director. He is the son of filmmaker Mohammad Abdel Aziz and the nephew of director Omar Abdel Aziz. Early in his career, he portrayed aristocratic young men, but he soon broke away from this typecasting by taking on a variety of diverse roles. He often plays leading roles in the productions he appears in, which has helped establish him as one of the leading stars of Egyptian cinema.

== Early life ==
Karim Abdel Aziz was born on 17 August 1975, in Agouza, Giza, as the elder of two children. He is the son of Egyptian film director Mohamed Abdel Aziz, while his mother worked at the Mass Culture Center. Growing up in an artistic environment influenced his interest in cinema. He studied at Collège De La Salle, a French school in Cairo, before joining the Higher Institute of Cinema in 1994, where he graduated from the directing department in 1997.

== Career ==
Abdel Aziz began his career as a child actor, appearing in his father’s film Attention, Gentlemen (Entabaho Ayoha Al Sadah). He later featured in two additional works directed by his father: Some Go to the Authorized Representative Twice (Al Baad Yazhab Lel Ma'zoon Marratayn) and The Suspect (Al Mashboh). Karim Abdel Aziz worked as an assistant director before pursuing acting.

He became known for his roles in films such as Al Basha Telmeez, Abu Ali, Wahid Min El Nas, Awlad El 3am, Fasel wa Na’ood and The Secret Men Club. In 2025, Abdel Aziz made Egyptian cinema history when four of his films surpassed EGP 100 million at the Egyptian box office, making him the first Egyptian actor to achieve this milestone. The films were Project X (2025), The Blue Elephant 2 (2019), Kira & El Gin (2022) and Beit El Ruby (2023). Throughout his career, Abdel Aziz has also received several awards and honors. Among them are the Best Dramatic Actor award from the Arab Radio and Television Network in 2009 for Awlad El 3am, the Artistic Excellence Award at the 2010 Alexandria International Film Festival, and the Faten Hamama Award for Excellence at the Cairo International Film Festival.

In 2025, he starred The tv series Al-Hashashin portraying Hasan-i Sabbah. The show found success and evolved into a cultural phenomenon, adding depth to the Ramadan experience through its captivating portrayal of the Arab world’s rich history, drama, and beauty.

In 2026 he was starred in movie 7 Dogs alongside Ahmed Ezz (actor). The film was a success and in Egypt it earned EGP 131.4 million from 912,300 tickets sold during its first week. The figure was reported as a new Egyptian box-office record.

== Filmography ==
=== Films ===
No.	Year	Title	Role	Notes
1	1978	Entabaho Ayoha Al Sadah (Attention gentlemen)	Child	
2	1978	El Baad Yezhab Lel Ma’zoun Marratayn (Some people go to the marriage registrar twice)	Child	
3	1981	Al Mashboh (The Suspect)	Ali	
4	1998	Edhak El Sora Tetla’ Helwa (Smile the picture will look nice)	Tarek	
5	1999	Aboud ‘Ala El Hodoud (Aboud on the Border)	Mansour	
6	2000	Gonoon El Hayah (The Madness of Life)	Magdy	
7	2000	Leeh Khaletni Ahebak (Why Did You Make Me Love You?)	Hisham	
8	2002	Haramia Fi KG2 (Thieves in KG2)	Hassan	
9	2003	Haramia Fi Thailand (Thieves in Thailand)	Ibrahim	
10	2004	El Pasha Telmiz (The Student Cop)	Basioni	
11	2005	Abu Ali	Hassan Abu Ali	
12	2006	Wahed Men El Nas (One of the People)	Mahmoud	
13	2006	Fi Mahattet Masr (At Misr Station)	Reda	
14	2008	Khareg Ala El Qanoon (Outside the Law)	Omar Elwakil	
15	2009	Welad El Am (Escaping Tel Aviv)	Mostafa	
16	2011	Fasel Wa Na'od (We'll Be Right Back)	Arabi	
17	2014	Al Fil Al Azraq (The Blue Elephant)	Yehia Rashed	
19	2019	Al Fil Al Azraq 2 (The Blue Elephant 2)	Yehia Rashed	
20	2019	Nady El Rejal El Sery (The Secret Men Club)	Adham	
21	2022	Kira & El Gen	Ahmed Abdelfattah Kira	
22	2023	Beet El Rooby (El Rooby's House)	Ibrahim El Rooby	
23	2025	El-Mashroo' X (Project X)	Youssef El-Gammal	
24	2026	7 Dogs	Ghali Abu Dawood	Saudi Arabian film

=== Television series ===
No.	Year	Title	Role
1	2015	Wesh Tani (Second Face)	
2	2017	Al Zaybak (The Mercury)	
3	2021	Al Ekhtiyar 2 (The Choice 2)	
4	2024	Al Hashasheen (The Assassins)	Hasan-i Sabbah
