= Daisy Jopling =

British classical/rock violinist (born 1969)

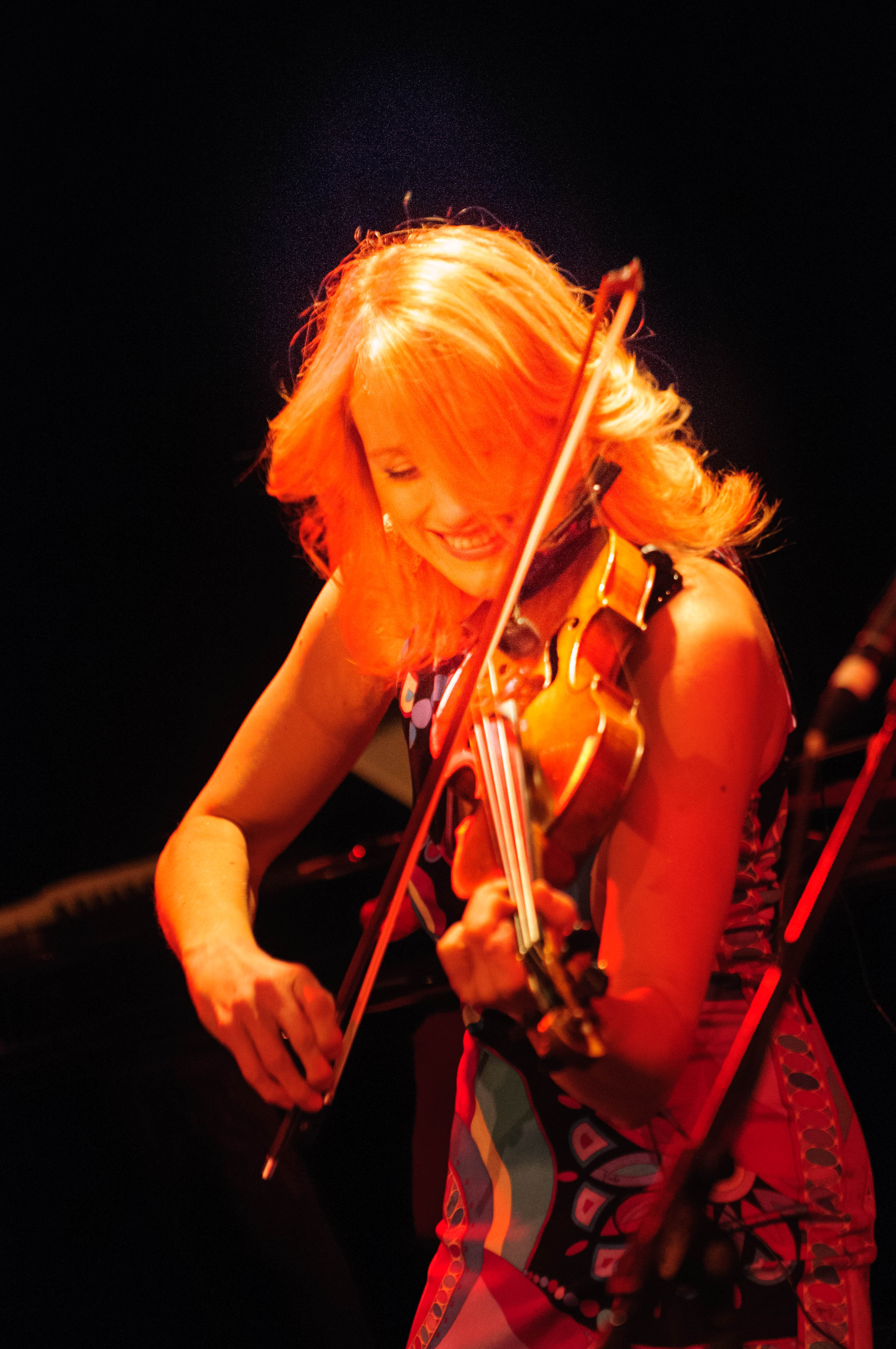
- Jopling performing in 2013

Background information
- Born: 19 February 1969 (age 57); London, England
- Genres: Classical, contemporary
- Instrument: Violin
- Years active: 1983–present
- Label: Tribeca Records
- Website: daisyjopling.com

Daisy Jopling is a British classical/rock violinist and composer who in 2012 was residing in New York. She tours the world with her own band, and has spearheaded a music mentorship foundation. She plays an Antonio Gragnani violin, made in Livorno, Italy in 1778 and a Yamaha electric violin. Jopling was the first international violinist to perform a major concert at the Great Pyramids of Giza in Egypt on 4 November 2022 produced by Red Amber Events, collaborating with Egyptian Stars Hany Adel, Wust El-Balad and Noha Fekry. She has released nine studio albums, two with BMG RCA Victor, and performed her own original show "Awakening" at Lincoln Center, NY.

== Early life and education ==
Daisy Jopling was born on 19 February 1969 in London, the great-granddaughter of painter Louise Jopling 1843-1933. She began playing the violin at age 3 and at age 14 she performed Bach's Double Concerto for Violin and Oboe at the Royal Albert Hall in London. Jopling studied the violin with Frances Mason and Itzhak Rashkovsky at the Royal College of Music, David Takeno at the Guildhall School of Music and Drama, and Boris Kuschnir at the Konservatorium Wien, Austria. At age 19, Jopling studied Hungarian folk violin in Gymes, Transylvania. Five years later, Jopling travelled to Ghana alone to study Kpanlogo drumming at the Mustapha Tettey Addy drumming school. Jopling moved from London to Vienna in 1994 and to New York in 2006.

== Triology ==
For 13 years, Jopling toured with the creative string trio, Triology. Triology recorded four studio albums, two of them with BMG RCA Victor. Triology released "Triology plays Ennio Morricone" on 10 November 1998; and "Who Killed the Viola Player" on 11 May 2000. On Extraplatte Records, Triology released their third album, "Around the World in 77 Minutes". Their last studio album was recorded with Jazz guitarist Wolfgang Muthspiel on Material Records in 2003. Triology toured the world, performing in over 23 countries. The group has written the film music for three Georg Riha films, Schönbrunn, Die Wachau and Salzburg, and arranged and recorded Hans Zimmer's score in Hollywood for The Road to El Dorado and Spanglish.

== Collaborations ==
Jopling has collaborated with some of the world's top artists. With Triology, she shared a stage with Bobby McFerrin at the Centro Historico Festival in Mexico City, performed alongside solo violinists Julian Rachlin and Janine Jansen, and toured with jazz musician and producer, Wolfgang Muthspiel. With Ensemble Modern in Germany, Jopling collaborated with Shubha Mudgal, and with Kristjan Järvi's "Absolute Ensemble" she collaborated with Joe Zawinul. In 2000, Jopling and Milagros Pinera-Ibaceta, a Cuban singer, came together to create Son Dos. The two were later joined by tubist Jon Sass. Son Dos combines Cuban, Irish, and Classical music and released one album in 2003 called "Mañana Mi Amor" on Extraplatte Records. Son Dos has toured Belgium, Austria, Norway, Sweden, and Germany.

In 2005, Jopling performed before an audience of 30,000 people at the opening of the Vienna Festival in Austria with Cuban singer, Omara Portuondo. In May 2008 she was featured in the Russian Songbird Boris Grebenshchikov's concert at the Royal Albert Hall in London. In 2011, Jopling collaborated with Zimbabwean superstar Oliver Mtukudzi. In 2015, she collaborated with Trans-Siberian Orchestra's Rob Evan. In 2021, she collaborated with iconic Olympic Ceremony Creator Daniel Flannery on Transcendence, a music-theatre hybrid based on African American author Sarah Bracey White's memoir "Primary Lessons," and on 4 November 2022 Jopling collaborated with Egyptian stars Hany Adel, Wust El-Balad and Noha Fekry on an extraordinary concert at the Great Pyramids of Giza in Cairo, Egypt.

== Solo work and the Daisy Jopling Band ==
In 2009, Jopling collaborated with NYC producer Bojan Dugic to record her first solo album "Key to the Classics". In 2011, Jopling formed "The Daisy Jopling Band" which has a classical/rock/jazz fusion sound. Jopling has performed in Austria, Germany, Switzerland, Italy, France, Spain, Sweden, Norway, England, Ukraine, Hungary, Slovenia, Slovakia, Croatia, Japan, China, Korea, Australia, Singapore, Turkey, Egypt, Saudi Arabia, Mexico and the US, and continues to perform all over the world.

Jopling performed solo before 30,000 at the Opening of the Vienna Festival in Austria in 2005 and toured to 53 concert halls in China in 2015 and 2019 with her band.

Jopling has composed the music for documentaries Gesicht einer Stadt, and "Feathers from the Sky", a NYC puppet show. She has performed on fashion runways for Eileen Fisher and Danilo Gabrielli.

In September 2016 she premiered her own original "Awakening" Show, conducted by Dean Fransen and featuring rhythm specialist Michael Feigenbaum. It was later performed at Alice Tully Hall, Lincoln Center on 27 August 2017.

In October 2020, Jopling and her team created the magical concert "Illuminance" on Bannerman Island in the middle of the Hudson River, New York. It was the only ticketed music event allowed in the whole of New York State in the middle of the pandemic, as the island is accessible only by boat. The Island has no electricity, but lighting designer Deke Hazirjian rented a barge for a generator and illuminated Bannerman Castle. The concert video, filmed by Diane Cricchio and Timeline Video, aired on WMHT and All Arts PBS in 2021 and 2022.

In 2021, Jopling collaborated with Olympic Ceremony Creator Daniel Flannery and African American author Sarah Bracey-White to create "Transcendence", a hybrid music/theater experience which traces the influences of African American music over the last one hundred years, and is set to a poignant, intimate theater experience of Sarah Bracey White’s memoir "Primary Lessons".

In 2022, Jopling partnered with Ragnhild Ek from Red Amber Events to create "Irradiance at the Great Pyramids of Egypt", a concert performed at the iconic venue "Kundalini Grand Pyramids" at the foot of the Great Pyramid of Giza in Egypt. Daisy collaborated with Hany Adel, Wust El-Balad, Noha Fekry, Ahmed Omar, AfriCairo and other well-known Egyptian musicians to create a show that was described in Egypt Today as "a dazzling, powerful fusion of Western and Middle Eastern music. This spectacular concert was a memorable and beautiful experience that left no-one untouched."

Of her musical motivation, Jopling said "I am passionate about creating world-class musical and theatrical performances which bring communities together and empower women and children, with a mission of healing and uplifting the world."

Jopling’s music is distributed by Tribeca Records.

== The String Pulse Experience ==
Daisy Jopling has created many original shows with beat boxing, body percussion, spoken word and rhythms from around the world, accompanied by projections. They are written for her band, and can include up to 200 students: singing, playing instruments, and dancing. It gives Jopling a thrill to see students growing musically, gradually realizing their infinite potential. A documentary film of the String Pulse Experience was made by Mountain Lake PBS in 2017.

== Daisy Jopling Music Mentorship Foundation ==
Since living in NY, Jopling has become passionate about music education. Her music mentorship foundation has served over 6,000 students in New York State.

== Discography ==
Studio Albums:

Triology:

- "Triology plays Ennio Morricone" 10 November 1998, BMG RCA Victor
- "Who Killed the Viola Player?" 11 May 2000, BMG RCA Victor
- "Around the World in 77 minutes" Fall 2002 Extraplatte
- That's All Daisy Needs" with Wolfgang Muthspiel. 2003 Material Records

Son Dos:

- Mañana mi Amor” July 14, 2003, Extraplatte

Solo:

- Neil Gardner’s "October Op 20" for violin and orchestra
- "Key to the Classics" 8 January 2009 (Daisy Jopling) CD Baby
- "The Healer Within" 21 June 2012 (Daisy Jopling Band) CD Baby
- "Awakening" 17 March 2016 (Daisy Jopling Band) Fleur de Son Record Label, Naxos Worldwide Distribution
- "Who's Who" 10 February 2019 (Daisy Jopling Band) Tea 4 2 Record Label

== Filmography ==
- "Music Magic: The String Pulse Experience", Documentary by Diana C. Frank
- "Illuminance", by Diane Cricchio from Timeline Video
