= 59th Venice International Film Festival =

Italian film festival in 2002

- Festival poster
- Opening film: Frida
- Closing film: Johan Padan and the Discovery of the Americas
- Location: Venice, Italy
- Founded: 1932
- Awards: Golden Lion: The Magdalene Sisters
- Artistic director: Moritz de Hadeln
- Festival date: 29 August–8 September 2002
- Website: Website

Venice Film Festival chronology
- 60th 58th

The 59th annual Venice International Film Festival was held from 29 August to 8 September 2002, at Venice Lido in Italy.

Chinese actress Gong Li was the Jury President of the main competition. The Golden Lion was awarded to The Magdalene Sisters by Peter Mullan.

== Jury ==
The following people comprised the 2001 jury:

=== Main Competition ===
- Gong Li, Chinese actress - Jury President
- Jacques Audiard, French filmmaker
- Ulrich Felsberg, German film producer
- László Kovács, Hungarian cinematographer
- Francesca Neri, Italian actress
- Yeşim Ustaoğlu, Turkish filmmaker
- Yevgeny Yevtushenko, Russian poet

=== Luigi De Laurentiis Award for a Debut Feature ===
- Katinka Faragó, Swedish film producer - Jury President
- Reinhard Hauff, German filmmaker
- Derek Malcolm, English film critic
- Paolo Virzì, Italian filmmaker
- Eva Zaoralova, Czech film critic

=== Controcorrente ===
- Ghassan Abdul Khalek, Lebanese film critic - Jury President
- Catherine Breillat, French filmmaker
- Peggy Chiao, Taiwanese filmmaker
- Klaus Eder, German film critic
- Enrico Ghezzi, Italian film critic

== Official Sections ==
=== In Competition ===
The following films were selected for the main competition:

English title	Original title	Director(s)	Production country
Almost Peaceful	Un monde presque paisible	Michel Deville	France
Bear's Kiss		Sergei Bodrov	Germany, Sweden, Russia, Spain, France, Italy
The Best of Times	美麗時光	Chang Tso-chi	Taiwan
Dirty Pretty Things		Stephen Frears	United Kingdom
Dolls	ドールズ	Takeshi Kitano	Japan
Far from Heaven		Todd Haynes	United States
Frida		Julie Taymor	United States
Führer Ex		Winfried Bonengel	Germany, Italy
House of Fools	Дом дураков	Andrei Konchalovsky	Russia
A Journey Called Love	Un viaggio chiamato amore	Michele Placido	Italy
Julie Walking Home		Agnieszka Holland	Canada, Germany, Poland
The Magdalene Sisters		Peter Mullan	United Kingdom, Ireland
The Man on the Train	L'Homme du train	Patrice Leconte	France
Maximum Velocity (V-Max)	Velocità massima	Daniele Vicari	Italy
My Voice	Nha fala	Flora Gomes	Cape Verde, Portugal, France, Luxembourg
Naked	Nackt	Doris Dörrie	Germany
Nearest to Heaven	Au plus près du paradis	Tonie Marshall	France, Spain, Canada
Oasis	오아시스	Lee Chang-dong	South Korea
The Power of the Past	La forza del passato	Piergiorgio Gay	Italy
Road to Perdition		Sam Mendes	United States
The Tracker		Rolf de Heer	Australia

=== Out of Competition ===
The following films were screened out of competition:

English title	Original title	Director(s)	Production country
Between Strangers		Edoardo Ponti	Canada, Italy
Blood Work		Clint Eastwood	United States
The Dancer Upstairs	Pasos de baile	John Malkovich	Spain, United States
K-19: The Widowmaker		Kathryn Bigelow	United Kingdom, Germany, Canada, United States
The Magic Box	La boîte magique	Ridha Behi	France, Tunisia
My Name Is Tanino		Paolo Virzì	Italy, Canada
Naqoyqatsi		Godfrey Reggio	United States
Ripley's Game		Liliana Cavani	Italy, United Kingdom, United States
Ten Minutes Older: The Cello		Mike Figgis, Bernardo Bertolucci, Jiří Menzel, István Szabó, Claire Denis, Volker Schlöndorff, Michael Radford and Jean-Luc Godard	United Kingdom, Germany, France
Venetian Rascal Goes to America	Johan Padan a la descoverta de le Americhe	Giulio Cingoli	Italy, France

=== Controcorrente ===
The following feature films were screened in the Controcorrente (lit. 'against the current', nonconformist) section:

English title	Original title	Director(s)	Production country
Friday Night	Vendredi soir	Claire Denis	France
Full Frontal		Steven Soderbergh	United States
Ken Park		Larry Clark and Edward Lachman	United States
Lilya 4-ever		Lukas Moodysson	Sweden
Lilly's Story		Roviros Manthoulis	Greece
The Missing Gun	Xun qiang	Lu Chuan	China
Music for Weddings and Funerals	Musikk for bryllup og begravelser	Unni Straume	Norway, Sweden
Nuomos sutartis		Kristijonas Vildziunas	Lithuania
Poniente		Chus Gutiérrez	Spain
Public Toilet	人民公廁	Fruit Chan	South Korea, Hong Kong, Japan
Shadow Kill	Nizhalkuthu	Adoor Gopalakrishnan	India
Rosa La China		Valeria Sarmiento	Cuba
A Snake of June	六月の蛇	Shinya Tsukamoto	Japan
Soul Mate	L'anima gemella	Sergio Rubini	Italy
Springtime in a Small Town	Xiao cheng zhi chun	Tian Zhuangzhuang	China
Untouched by the West	Un homme sans l'Occident	Raymond Depardon	France
The Virgin of Lust	La virgen de la lujuria	Arturo Ripstein	Mexico
Women's Prison	زندان زنان	Manijeh Hekmat	Iran

=== New Territories ===
The following feature films were screened in the New Territories (Italian: Nuovi Territori) section:

English title	Original title	Director(s)	Production country
Aiki		Daisuke Tengan	Japan
Black Tape: A Tehran Diary		Fariborz Kamkari	Iran
Blessed		Rachel Douglas	New Zealand
Goldfish game		Jan Lauwers	Belgium
The Judge	Sudijata	Zaneta Vangeli	Macedonia
K		Shoja Azari	Iran
Kuang wu you yu		Lin Tay-jou	Taiwan
Her	Lei	Tonino De Bernardi	Italy
London Orbital		Christopher Petit, Iain Sinclair	United Kingdom
Luparella		Giuseppe Bertolucci	Italy
Open My Heart	Aprimi il cuore	Giada Colagrande	Italy
The Red Flag Flies	Hongqi piao	Hongxiang Zhou	China
The River	Река	Aleksei Balabanov	Russia
Sky. Plane. Girl	Небо. Самолёт. Девушка	Vera Storozheva	Russia
Stones in the Sky	Rocha que Voa	Eryk Rocha	Brazil
Vecchie		Daniele Segre	Italy

== Independent Sections ==
=== Venice International Film Critics' Week ===
The following feature films were selected to be screened as In Competition for this section:

English title	Original title	Director(s)	Production country
Two Friends	Due Amici	Spiro Scimone, Francesco Sframeli	Italy
The Exam	Emtehan	Nasser Refaie	Iran
The Kite	Zmej	Aleksej Muradov	Russia
Roger Dodger		Dylan Kidd	United States
Somewhere Over the Dreamland	Meng huan bu luo	Cheng Wen-tang	Taiwan
Step by Step	Un honnête commerçant	Philippe Blasband	Belgium
Woman of Water	Mizu no onna	Hidenori Sugimori	Japan

== Official Awards ==
=== Main Competition ===
- Golden Lion: The Magdalene Sisters by Peter Mullan
- Grand Special Jury Prize: House of Fools by Andrei Konchalovsky
- Silver Lion for Best Direction: Oasis by Lee Chang-dong
- Award for Outstanding Individual Contribution: Edward Lachman for Far from Heaven (cinematography)
- Volpi Cup for Best Actor: Stefano Accorsi for A Journey Called Love
- Volpi Cup for Best Actress: Julianne Moore for Far from Heaven
- Marcello Mastroianni Award: Moon So-ri for Oasis

=== Golden Lion for Lifetime Achievement ===
- Dino Risi

=== Short Films Competition (Corto Cortissimo) ===
- Silver Lion for Best Short Film: Clown by Irina Efteeva
- Special Mention Best Short Film: Per Carleson for Tempo

=== Luigi De Laurentiis Award for Debut Feature ===
- Two Friends by Francesco Sframeli and Spiro Scimone
- Roger Dodger by Dylan Kidd

== Independent Awards ==
=== San Marco Prize ===
- Tian Zhuangzhuang for Springtime in a Small Town
- Special Jury Award: Shinya Tsukamoto for A Snake of June
  - Special Mention: Arturo Ripstein for The Virgin of Lust
  - Special Mention: Fruit Chan for Public Toilet

=== Audience Award ===
- Best Film:The Man on the Train by Patrice Leconte
- Best Actor: Jean Rochefort for The Man on the Train
- Best Actress: Julianne Moore for Far from Heaven

=== Prix UIP Venice (European Short Film) ===
- Zsofia Péterffy for Kalózok szeretöje

=== FIPRESCI Prize ===
- Competition: Oasis by Lee Chang-dong
- Parallel Sections: Roger Dodger by Dylan Kidd
- Best Short Film: 11'09"01 September 11 by Ken Loach's section

=== SIGNIS Award ===
- Oasis by Lee Chang-dong
  - Honorable Mention: Far from Heaven by Todd Haynes
  - Honorable Mention: The Tracker by Rolf de Heer

=== Don Quixote Award ===
- Roger Dodger by Dylan Kidd

=== UNICEF Award ===
- House of Fools by Andrei Konchalovsky

=== UNESCO Award ===
- 11'09"01 September 11 by Samira Makhmalbaf, Claude Lelouch, Youssef Chahine, Danis Tanović, Idrissa Ouedraogo, Ken Loach, Alejandro González Iñárritu, Amos Gitaï, Mira Nair, Sean Penn and Shōhei Imamura

=== Pasinetti Award ===
- Best Film: Velocità massima by Daniele Vicari
  - Special Mention: Velocità massima by Valerio Mastandrea

=== Pietro Bianchi Award ===
- Sophia Loren

=== Isvema Award ===
- Due amici by Francesco Sframeli and Spiro Scimone

=== FEDIC Award ===
- Velocità massima by Daniele Vicari

=== Little Golden Lion ===
- Behind the Sun by Walter Salles and Arthur Cohn

=== Wella Prize ===
- L'anima gemella by Violante Placido and Valentina Cervi

=== Future Film Festival Digital Award ===
- Blood Work by Clint Eastwood
  - Special Mention: My Name Is Tanino by Paolo Virzì

=== Laterna Magica Prize ===
- Nha Fala by Flora Gomes

=== Sergio Trasatti Award ===
- Dirty Pretty Things by Stephen Frears

=== Rota Soundtrack Award ===
- Alberto Iglesias for The Dancer Upstairs

=== Mimmo Rotella Foundation Award ===
- Frida by Julie Taymor

=== Kinematrix Film Award ===
- Feature Films: Goldfish Game by Jan Lauwers
- Other Formats: A Snake of June by Shinya Tsukamoto
- Special Director's Award: Oasis by Lee Chang-dong
