= Kenneth Harding =

Kenneth Harding may refer to:

- Kenneth R. Harding (1914–2007), Sergeant at Arms of the United States House of Representatives
- Kenneth Harding (sportsman) (1892–1977), English cricketer and rugby union player
- Kenneth Harding (composer), composer of viola compositions, see List of compositions for viola: F to H
- A pseudonym of Paul Little
