= Padre (film) =

2016 Italian film

- Directed by: Giada Colagrande
- Written by: Giada Colagrande; Claudio Colombo
- Produced by: Gaia Furrer
- Starring: Giada Colagrande; Willem Dafoe; Franco Battiato; Marina Abramović
- Release date: October 25, 2016 (Morelia)
- Running time: 91 minutes
- Country: Italy
- Language: Italian

Padre is a 2016 Italian drama film written by Giada Colagrande and Claudio Colombo, directed by Colagrande and starring Colagrande, Willem Dafoe, Franco Battiato and Marina Abramović.

== Premise ==
Mourning the death of her father, Giulia is contacted by him from the other dimension.

== Cast ==
- Giada Colagrande as Giulia Fontana
- Willem Dafoe as James Verdun
- Franco Battiato Giulio Fontana
- Marina Abramović Giulia's mother
- Claudio Colombo as Claudio
- Carlo Guaitoli as Carlo
- Fabio Balasso as Fabio
- Annalisa Canfora as Annalisa
- Gemma Carbone as Gemma
- Alice Colombo as Alice
- Alessandra Cristiani as Ale
- Esther Elisha as Esther

== Release ==
The film premiered at the Morelia International Film Festival on October 25, 2016.

== Reception ==
Anton Bitel of Projected Figures gave the film a positive review and wrote, "Patience is indeed required to navigate this mystery’s enigmatic, circular structure – but along the way, Giulia’s ghost-watching cat Colombo is a constant source of entertainment."

Rich Cline of Shadows on the Wall awarded the film three stars out of five and wrote, "The film looks superb, with a terrific series of settings and characters, even if most scenes are overrun with obtuse quotations."

Lorenzo Belenguer of Escapadas Ideas Mag gave the film a positive review and wrote, "Constantly in a restrained mode, it is brilliantly acted specially by Colagrande and Dafoe. A film that I highly recommend."

=== Accolades ===
Award	Date of ceremony	Category	Recipient	Result	Ref.
UK Film Festival	24 November 2018	Best Actor	Willem Dafoe	Won	
