= Jacqueline Townshend =

British pianist, violinist and violist (1912 - 1983)

- Born: Jacqueline Mary Townshend; 15 January 1912; Hastings, East Sussex, England
- Died: 2 July 1983 (aged 71) Bexhill-on-Sea, East Sussex, England
- Genre: Classical
- Occupation: Musician
- Instruments: Viola, Violin, Piano
- Formerly of: BBC Symphony Orchestra, London Consort of Viols

Jacqueline Mary Townshend (15 January 1912 – 2 July 1983) was a British pianist, violinist and violist who played with the BBC Symphony Orchestra and the London Consort of Viols. She was a pupil of Lionel Tertis, performing and broadcasting with a number of ensembles from the 1930s to the 1960s.

== Biography ==
Jacqueline Townshend was born on 15 January 1912 in Hastings, the youngest child of Harry Townshend, Assistant Accountant-General at the GPO and Eleanor Esther Auvache. Townshend was a gifted violinist, violist and pianist. At just 9 years of age she won the gold medal at the London Festival for piano duets with a perfect score (100 marks) and won third prize for her violin and piano playing. A year later, aged 10 she was awarded the highest marks in the United Kingdom in the intermediate piano division at Trinity College of Music and the highest marks in London for senior violin. Trinity College of Music awarded her an Exhibition for her achievement which was presented to her by Princess Patricia of Connaught.

In 1928 aged sixteen, she won the London Festival "Daily News and Westminster" Scholarship prize of £100 for further musical training. She also received a parchment certificate signed by Princess Helena Victoria. The London Festival was, at the time, the premier music festival in the country, with 4,250 entries and more than 12,000 competitors. It was considered to be the largest music competition in the world.

In November 1928 Townshend was awarded the prize of a Steinway piano for winning the National Piano Playing Competition.

She studied at the Royal Academy of Music (RAM) in London. She studied piano with Harold Craxton and viola and chamber music with Lionel Tertis. Whilst at the RAM she won numerous competitions and awards. She was awarded the Ada Lewis Scholarship, the RAM Club Prize, the Walter Macfarren Prize, the Sterndale Bennett Prize, the Marguerite Elzy Withers Memorial Prize, the Edwin Samuel Dove prize, (awarded to the Student that distinguished himself or herself most in general excellence, assiduity, and industry), the Beare's Bow Prize (1929) and the Sir Edward Cooper ensemble prize. In December 1929 she gained her performers' licentiates from the Royal Academy of Music (LRAM) on both the violin and piano.

In 1929 she performed Nicolai Medtner's Piano Concerto No.2 with the New Symphony Orchestra conducted by Adrian Boult.

By the early 1930s she was performing as a recitalist and concerto soloist on both the violin and the piano, performing at the Aeolian Hall and Wigmore Hall in London. Her recitals often featured the works of contemporary British composers such as a recital she gave in April 1935, when she performed a string trio by Benjamin Frankel and a sonata for violin and piano by Francis Hamilton. Townshend played violin as a member of the Boyd Neel Orchestra, from its foundation in 1933, playing in the first ever concert by the orchestra.

In 1935 she joined the BBC Symphony Orchestra on the first desk of violas, where she played for 16 years, from March 1935 to June 1951, playing alongside Harry Danks. In 1936 she was the leader of the Haigh Marshall String Orchestra.

During and after the war, she continued to perform recitals in a variety of ensembles. In 1942 she performed in a war-time concert at Woburn Sands in aid of the British Red Cross and the Joint Committee for Soviet Aid. At the concert she performed the Ballade in F Minor (1929) by Mina Nerenstein, a fellow student at the RAM. In 1948 she played with the English String Quartet, with Kathleen Washbourne (violin), Belle Davidson (violin) and Kathleen Moorhouse (cello).

In 1948, Harry Danks asked Townshend and two other of his colleagues in the BBC Symphony Orchestra, to help him form the London Consort of Viols. Their first performance went out on the BBC Third Programme on 19 May 1949 and they performed regularly throughout the 1950s.

Townshend was a professor of viola at the Royal Academy of Music and taught violin and viola at Queen's College, London.

Townshend played on a 1751 Gragnani Violin.

Jacqueline Townshend died in Bexhill-on-Sea on 2 July 1983.
