= Open My Heart (film) =

2002 film

- Directed by: Giada Colagrande
- Written by: Giada Colagrande; Francesco Di Pace
- Starring: Giada Colagrande; Natalie Cristiani; Claudio Botosso
- Cinematography: Luca Coassin; Nicola Vicenti
- Edited by: Fabio Nunziata
- Release date: 2002
- Country: Italy
- Language: Italian

Open My Heart (Italian: Aprimi il cuore) is a 2002 Italian neo-noir drama film co-written and directed by Giada Colagrande, in her feature film debut.

The film premiered at the 59th edition of the Venice Film Festival, in the New Territories sidebar.

== Cast ==
- Giada Colagrande as Caterina
- Natalie Cristiani as Maria
- Claudio Botosso as Giovanni
- Filippo Timi as a customer
- Tonino De Bernardi as a customer
