= Women Without Men (2009 film) =

2009 film by Shirin Neshat and Shoja Azari

- Film poster
- Directed by: Shirin Neshat; Shoja Azari
- Written by: Shoja Azari; Shirin Neshat; Steven Henry Madoff; Shahrnush Parsipur (novel)
- Produced by: Shoja Azari; Philippe Bober; Jerome de Noirmont; Barbara Gladstone; Martin Gschlacht; Isabell Wiegand; Manfred Zurhorst
- Starring: Shabnam Tolouei; Pegah Ferydoni; Arita Shahrzad; Orsolya Tóth; Mehdi Moinzadeh; Navíd Akhavan; Mina Azarian; Bijan Daneshmand
- Cinematography: Martin Gschlacht
- Edited by: George Cragg; Patrick Lambertz; Jay Rabinowitz; Christof Schertenleib; Julia Wiedwald
- Music by: Ryûichi Sakamoto
- Distributed by: IndiePix Films (US)
- Release date: September 9, 2009 (Venice Film Festival)
- Running time: 95 minutes
- Countries: Germany; Austria; France; Iran
- Language: Persian

Women Without Men is a 2009 film adaptation of the 1990 Shahrnush Parsipur novel, directed by Shirin Neshat. Neshat's work explores gender issues in the Islamic world. Women Without Men is her first dramatic feature.

The film profiles the lives of four women living in Tehran in 1953, during the American-backed coup that returned the Shah of Iran to power.

The film was called "visually transfixing" by The New York Times reviewer Stephen Holden, who added, "the film surpasses even Michael Haneke's The White Ribbon in the fierce beauty and precision of its cinematography (by Martin Gschlacht)." Two of the film's recurrent images are of a long dirt road extending to the horizon on which the characters walk, and a river that suggests, "a deep current of feminine resilience below an impassive exterior."

== Production ==
Women Without Men was filmed in Morocco, with Casablanca standing in for Tehran, Iran. The film originated as a video installation by the filmmaker and artist, Shirin Neshat.

== Plot ==
The film begins with the sound of Adhaan. A woman is standing on the rooftop contemplating jumping. She jumps in slow motion. Flashback. Munis does not want a husband. Her tyrannical brother, Amir Khan, wants Munis to prepare for a visiting suitor and demands that she cook dinner for them. When she scoffs at the idea, he gets angry, and threatens that if she leaves the house he will break her legs.

Protests fill the street. People are chanting "Durood bar Mosaddegh, marg bar Englis" ("Long live Mosaddegh, Death to Britain"). A second woman, the religiously observant Faezeh (Pegah Ferydoni), joins Munis and they discuss the protests. Faezeh calls the protestors "a bunch of ne'r do wells". Munis suggests that they themselves should be outside protesting. Faezeh, who secretly longs to marry Munis' brother, asks if it is true that he will marry someone else. Munis nods her head, yes.

A prostitute, Zarin (Orsi Toth), puts on makeup. A male client gets up and dresses. As Zarin washes her face, a brothel madam is calling out her name. Zarin curls into a corner and begins to sob, as the madam continues to yell that there is another customer. Another man appears in Zarin's room. Surrealistically, in Zarin's point-of-view, he appears to be "faceless." Zarin rushes out of the brothel, the madam calling after her.

In the next sequence, a wealthy 50-year-old woman named Fakhri (Arita Shahrzad), arrives at a military event where her husband Sadr, a general, is being honored. They get into a marital dispute about another officer, an old flame, Abbas (Bijan Daneshmand) who has returned to Tehran and with whom she has been seen talking. Sadr tells Fakhri she is aging and that if she is unable to satisfy him sexually, he'll get another wife. Crying, she says she is tired of him and leaves.

Faezeh and Munis are in the garden of Munis' home, gossiping about the woman that Munis' brother is planning to marry. It is suggested that the fiancee may not even be a virgin. Munis' brother shows up and they get into another argument.

Zarin the prostitute is at a bath house. She is wearing a long (a traditional Iranian piece of cloth used to cover the body in a public bath). A female dallak (a person whose job is to help people wash themselves in a public bath) offers to aid her but she refuses. When Zarin opens the robe to bathe, her gaunt body and protruding ribs are revealed. She proceeds to scrub her body vigorously, so hard that her skin becomes raw and bleeds.

Faezeh and Amir Khan find Munis, apparently dead, in the street. She seems to have jumped from the roof while they were getting ready, after Amir unplugs her only connection to the outside world, the radio. On discovering her body, Amir curses her for disgracing him and buries her in the garden as Faezeh looks on.

A group of women in black chadors are mourning. Zarin, in a white flowered chador, walks by, scowling. She continues walking until she comes to a group of men in sujud during prayer. She defiantly stands in front of them until they rise. She then scampers away into the night. Zarin walks until daybreak onto a dirt road, and the rivulet from the beginning of the film appears again. She walks into the river, leaving her chador behind.

The military wife, Fakhri, arrives at a restaurant where her old flame, Abbas, is having a sociopolitical discussion with a group of artists. When they are alone, the young man recites some poetry to her. He tells her she seems sad, upon which she reveals that she has decided to leave her husband, Sadr. In the next scene she is being driven along the dirt road. She steps out of the luxury car and arrives at the gate. A man (the same one who was seen stroking Zarin the prostitute) opens the door. He says that he has been waiting for her. He takes Fakhri to a beautiful, quaint villa house, a mystical retreat which she buys. The interior, while luxurious, is filled with dust. Fakhri examines the house. There are books and instruments, but the place is covered in cobwebs. She walks into the garden and looks into a river, where she sees Zarin lying unconscious. Fakhri calls the man for help and he carries Zarin into the house.

Faezeh is with an old woman with divine powers whom Faezeh has approached to cast a love spell on Amir Khan. While in Amir Khan's house following the seer's instructions, in a magical realist trope, Faezeh hears Munis' voice beckoning from the ground. Munis tells Faezeh that she can no longer breathe, and Faezeh digs her out of the ground. Munis then walks into the howz and immerses herself in the water.

Munis, who was a virtual prisoner in the house even when controlled by her tyrannical brother, goes out to a café to listen to the radio, Faezeh following her. Noticing two men gazing at her, Faezeh quickly walks away. The men follow Faezeh. Munis walks out to find Faezeh curled up into a ball and crying after she has been raped, and takes her to the garden. Walking through the trees, Faezeh prays to God to forgive her "sin". She follows some singing and arrives at the cobweb house, where she finds the military wife. She tells her that she has lost her way and asks for water. She then sees Zarin, the prostitute, lying on a bed.

The next sequence shifts to a street in Tehran. Munis begins a second fantasy life as an independent woman working with an underground Communist group. She becomes infatuated with a young man who is telling people to band together and fight injustice. He shouts, "Long live freedom!" as he scampers away to avoid authorities. Munis asks if he is a member of the Tudeh Party. As he leaves, he gives her a pamphlet, saying he hopes to see her again. A crowd is in the street shouting the same slogans as before. The crowd is wearing white, and Munis, now standing among them, is wearing a black chador. She says that this time, she is here, "Not only to look, but to see. Not only to be, but to do."

Faezeh is praying. Noticing the gardener outside her window, she rushes to close it, darkening the room. Flash to a dark dreamscape where Munis is calling Faezeh's name. In this surreal sequence filled with abstract voices and music, she watches herself lying on the ground helpless, as the two men rape her. Faezeh awakes at Fakhri's cottage of refuge, in a bed next to Zarin's. Faezeh walks out of the house without her requisite chador, her long hair flowing down to her shoulders. She arrives in a fantastic field of red flowers.

A meeting occurs among members of the Tudeh Party, including the young man Munis met earlier. An announcement is made that the British government has declared Mosaddegh's government illegal and plans to stage a coup d'etat. That night, they distribute flyers under doors. During the day, people continue to protest. A man is speaking on a megaphone, claiming the Shah has run away, but the danger of a coup is still imminent.

We return to Fakhri's mystical house of refuge, where Faezeh and Zarin are recuperating. Fakhri announces she wants to "open the garden doors" and have a party. Faezeh likes the idea, but Zarin doesn't. Later that night, a tree mysteriously falls through one of the windows. Zarin is lying in some greenery outside, scowling. Munis' narration: "The garden is turning. Under this great weight, it seems sick. Now, there is no way back, and no peace."

A different group of protesters, shouting out, "Javid Shah" ("Long live the Shah") collide with Mossadegh's supporters. Gunshots ring out. Munis is seen among Mossadegh's supporters. She no longer wears a chador.

The gardener walks into the house, carrying Zarin, who has fallen ill again. Fakhri tells him to put her in her bedroom, as she is preparing the living room for the party. The party guests arrive. A man recites (Saadi) poetry. People drink, "to the health of the Shah's rule." Amir Khaan arrives and witnesses Faezeh tending to Zarin, the prostitute. Amir asks Faezeh what has happened to her hijab (head covering) and who are these dubious people he thinks she has surrounded herself with. He questions Faezeh's faith, and queries whether or not she still prays. Amir tells Faezeh that he has now come to take her hand and not to worry about his other wife, who will act as a servant to her. Faezeh replies, "And perhaps when you get tired of me I will serve your third wife". Faezeh leaves in anger. Police arrive, inquiring about the home's owner. The police search the place, and then later are invited to sit down to a grand dinner. The guests ask the police which dissidents they are searching for (the Tudehs, or Mossadegh's supporters). A guest replies, "It doesn't matter. Opposition is opposition. We are all Shah-supporters here".

The next scene is a Tudeh marriage gathering, a celebration which may be a front for their covert publishing activities. Munis is in a back room where a political discussion is ongoing. One of the Tudehs has been taken by the police and they are discussing whether he will talk under torture.

At the garden party, a soldier is praising his country to a foreign guest. Her fiance (Fakhri's old flame) thanks Fakhri and asks her to sing. Faezeh sits with Zarin, who is sweating profusely. The police raid the place. Meanwhile, the Tudeh publishing room and wedding party are also raided. The captured Tudeh, a young man, also arrives with the police. He has been battered and bruised. Munis's friend gets in a scuffle with a young soldier, whom he kills with a knife. Munis cries over the soldier's body.

Back at the garden party, Faezeh, crying, walks into the room where Fakhri is singing. Fakhri realizes that Zarin has died. Fakhri quietly makes her way to Zarin, touches her forehead, and weeps over her body. Munis narrates "Death is not difficult. It is imagining it that is difficult. It seems that what we were all looking for, was finding a new shape, a new way towards freedom." Munis falls from the rooftop in slow motion once again. There is no mistaking that the party is a last hurrah for a kind of social and political freedom that is now long gone.

== Cast ==
- Shabnam Tolouei as Munes
- Pegah Ferydoni as Faezeh
- Orsolya Tóth as Zarrin (credited as Zarin)
- Arita Shahrzad as Fakhri
- Bijan Daneshmand as Abbas
- Mehdi Moinzadeh as Sarhang

== Awards and honors ==
The film's director, Shirin Neshat, won the 2009 Venice Film Festival Silver Lion for best directing. The film was a "special presentation" at the 2009 Toronto International Film Festival.
