= Yasmin Raeis =

Egyptian actress (born 1985)

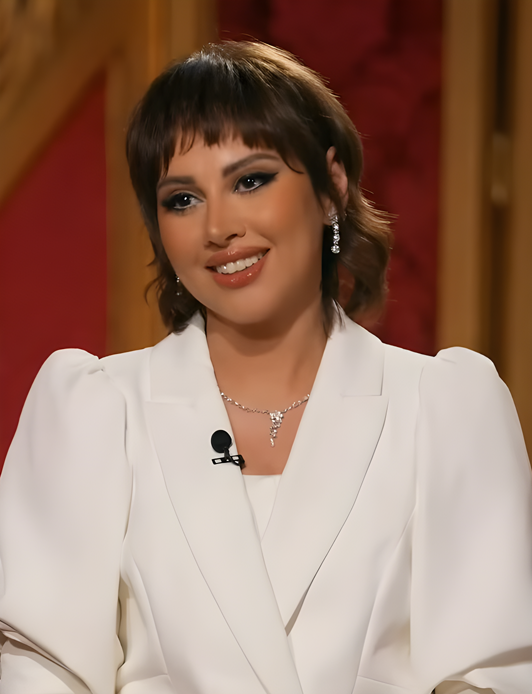
- Raeis in an interview for Channel 1, 2024
- Born: 15 September 1985 (age 40); Kuwait
- Citizenship: Egyptian
- Occupations: Actress and model
- Years active: 2007–present
- Children: 1

Yasmin Raeis (Arabic: ياسمين رئيس, born 15 September 1985) is an Egyptian actress. She started her acting career in a television series called Aard khas. In addition, she was the main character under the supervision of the movie director Mohamed Khan in a movie called Factory Girl, a movie that was a big success and garnered several awards, both locally and internationally.

== Biography ==
Raeis was born on 15 September 1985, in Egypt, to a Palestinian Father and Egyptian mother, after a successful modeling career, Yasmin Raeis's decision to join the filmmaking industry as an aspiring actress marked a dramatic turn in her life, which paved the way for a more acute turning point when she was unexpectedly selected for her career-defining role in Mohamed Khan's Factory Girl in 2014. Yasmin played the role of a working girl who falls under the spell of love, transcending with this experience class difference to finally stand alone in face of a merciless traditional society that is afraid of love. Standing out as one of her most indelible performances, Khan predicted that the young Actress's performance will definitely land her a prestigious Best Actress award, later turned out to be true as the young actress received her first Best Actress award at Dubai International Film Festival 2013.

== Filmography ==
=== Film ===
- X-large (2011)
- Wahed Saheh
- El-Maslaha (2012)
- Kalam Garayed
- Factory Girl (2013)
- Made in Egypt
- Men Dahr Ragel
- Hepta
- Looking for Oum Kulthum (2017)
- Sheikh Jackson (2017)
- Kiss Me Not
- The Thief of Baghdad (2020)
- Al-Harith
- Qamar 14
- Mazinger Plan
- I Am for my Lover

=== Series ===
- A'rd Khas
- Lahazat Harega 3
- Taraf Talet
- Moga Harra
- Bedoun Zikr Asma'
- Al Mizan
- Ana shahera ana al khaen
- Mlook El Gdaana

== Awards and festivals ==
=== Awards ===
- Best Actress Award from Dubai International Film Festival.
- Best Actress Award from Malmo Arab Film Festival in Sweden.
- Best Actress Award at the 18th Egyptian National Film Festival.
- Best Actress Award at the 41st Egyptian Film Association Festival.
- Best Actress Award at Silk Road Film Festival in Dublin, Ireland.
- A Special Mention from the Jury of Feature Film within the International Oriental Film Festival.

=== Festivals ===
- Dubai International Film Festival
- Malmo Arab Film Festival
- Egyptian National Film Festival
- Egyptian Film Association Festival
- International Oriental Film Festival in Geneva
- MEDFilm Festival
- Sala Women Film Festival
- Montreal World Film Festival
- ANA Contemporary Arab Cinema Festival
- Twin Cities Arab Film Festival
- Shanghai International Film Festival
- Arab Film Festival in Seoul, Korea
- Kolkata Film Festival
- Safar: A Journey Through Popular Arab Cinema
- African Film Festival of Verona
- Franco Arab Film Festival
- Carthage Film Festival
