= Kenneth Harding (composer) =

British composer (1903 - 1992)

- Born: March 10, 1903; Abertillery, Monmouthshire, Wales
- Died: September 1992 (aged 88–89)

Kenneth Harding (10 March 1903 – September 1992) was a violist in the BBC Symphony Orchestra for thirty-five years and a British composer, composing primarily for viola.

== Biography ==
Amos ‘Kenneth’ Harding was born in Abertillery, Monmouthshire, Wales in 1903.

His early musical studies were with his father Amos Harding, who was a music teacher, choirmaster, pianist and organist. He started playing the violin at the age of six, and by the age of thirteen Harding was a professional violin player, playing in the cinema orchestra.

He joined the O’Mara Opera Company in 1917 and the Bath Municipal Orchestra in 1919.

He briefly studied with Dr. Norman Sprankling before entering the University College of Wales in Aberystwyth in 1920, to study composition with Sir Walford Davies, one-time Master of the King's Music. Harding, having initially studied the violin, took up the viola when Raymond Jeremy, the violist in the University of Wales String Quartet, left to study at London's Royal Academy of Music.

In 1925 Harding was appointed as a violin and viola teacher at the university and conducted the junior orchestra. He moved to Cardiff in 1927 and joined the Cardiff Station Orchestra. In 1928 he took up the principal viola position in the new National Orchestra of Wales. In 1930 he moved to London to take up the principal viola position in the newly formed BBC Symphony Orchestra under Sir Adrian Boult. He played with the BBCSO from 1930 until 1965.

On the advice of his doctor, Harding ceased playing the viola in 1988 but continued to compose until his death in September 1992.

== Compositions ==
His early compositions from the early 1920s came to the attention of Gustav Holst and in 1923 he composed three string quartets for the University of Wales String Quartet of which he was a member. His Passacaglia for Violin, Piano and Cello was amongst the first of his compositions to be broadcast. As early as 1930 his works had been played across Great Britain and in the United States.

Whilst a member of the BBCSO, many of his compositions were broadcast by the Cardiff Ensemble, the BBC Welsh Orchestra, and the BBC Symphony Orchestra.

Many of Harding's compositions were dedicated to well-known violists of the period, such as his 1931 Poem No. 1 for viola and piano, dedicated to Bernard Shore; his 1949 Divertimento for four violas, which was written for and dedicated to Harry Danks, and his 1950 Concertante for four violas, dedicated to Lionel Tertis.

On 4 January 1950 Harding's Divertimento for four violas was broadcast on the BBC by the composer and three colleagues from the BBC Symphony Orchestra – Harry Danks, Jacqueline Townshend and Stanley Wootton.

In March 1980 a Royal Academy of Music concert celebrated Harding's seventy-seventh birthday. Nine viola compositions by Harding were performed.

At the centenary of his birth, in 2003, there was a centenary tribute concert at the Lionel Tertis International Viola Competition and Workshop which featured several of Harding's compositions.

== List of Compositions ==
See also Welsh Library Archive

=== Works for Viola ===
- Concertante for 4 violas (1950) or 5 violas (1972). Dedicated to Lionel Tertis.
- Concerto for viola and orchestra (1950)
- Divertimento for 4 violas (1949); Corda Music Publications. First broadcast performance on 2 May 1950 (Harry Danks, Jacqueline Townshend, Stanley Wootton, Kenneth Harding).
- Duet Rhapsody for soprano and viola, based on James Joyce's Strings in the Earth and Air (1952). First broadcast performance in 1953 by Pamela Petts (soprano) and Harry Danks (viola).
- June Sunrise – Blue Sky, Idyll for 12 violas (1978); Dedictated to Dr. Thomas Tatton.
- Kammersymphonie Nonet for 9 violas (1956)
- Legend for viola and piano (1985)
- Metamorphsen for viola and string orchestra (1981)
- Moonlit Apples for viola and piano (1979)
- Phantasy of Light, Phantasy-Scherzo for 4 violas (1990)
- Poem No. 1 for viola and piano (1931); Comus Edition. Written for Bernard Shore.
- Renata da Capo for 10 violas (1987); Comus Edition
- Rondo Capriccio for 6 violas (1986); Corda Music Publications
- Scherzo (Enigma) for violin and viola (published 1950); J. & W. Chester
- Sonata for viola and piano (1979); Comus Edition
- Sonatina for 2 violas (1951); Comus Edition
- Suite for 3 violas (1980); Five movements: Rigaudon & Interlude, Tempo di Sarabande, Gavotte, Swallow Falls (Sound Picture) and Gigue. The work was composed as an act of gratitude for three violists, Harry Danks, John White and Eric Sargon, who had organised a concert of Harding's works at the Royal College of Music in London.
- Sunset Paradise for 7 violas (1986)
- Where the Willows Meet, a symphonic study (based on a poem by James Joyce) for viola and piano (1990)

=== Orchestral works ===
- Valse
- The Fairy Palace
- Symphony no. 1. (First performed by the National Orchestra of Wales at Cardiff City Hall.)
- Scherzo (1922). Performed 1925, Harlech Castle, Caernarvonshire Festival. Conducted by Harding.
- Prelude in A minor
- Overture in A major to the opera Giulio Cesare (Handel), orchestrated by Kenneth Harding (1924)
- Passacaglia (1925)
- Sohrab and Rustum, a symphonic poem. (1926)
- Phaethon, a symphonic poem. (1927)
- Rhapsody, a double concerto for violin and cello with accompaniment for orchestra.(1928). Received its first performance by the National Orchestra of Wales under Warwick Braithwaite in 1929.
- The Sun Descending in the West (words, William Blake), a choral symphonic poem for baritone solo, chorus and orchestra. (1944)
- Children's Phantasy (on tunes composed by pupils of the Margaret Hardy County Secondary School, Brighton), for string orchestra. (1946)
- Concerto for Oboe and Strings

=== Instrumental and chamber music ===
- Passacaglia for String Trio
- Passacaglia for Piano Quartet
- Trio in one movement for piano, violin and cello, op. 7. Variations on the Welsh Hymn tune Llydaw. (1939)
- Humoreske, for violin and piano. (1923)
- Slumber Song, for violin and piano.
- Three Miniature String Quartets (second group), comprising Prelude, Scherzo and Dawn. (1923)
- Pianoforte Quintet. Phantasy on the Welsh Melody Hobed o hilion.
- Sonata for two violins. (1950) 'For my colleagues Kathleen Washbourne and Patricia Lovell'. First broadcast performance by the dedicatees on 27 Sept 1960.
- Quartet for two violins, viola and cello. (1960) Commissioned by the BBC
- Sonata for unaccompanied violin. (1961) Dedicated to Patricia Lovell.
- Six Miniature Tone Pictures: Six progressive pieces for string players in the early grades, for three violins with optional piano and cello. (1967)

=== Piano music ===
- Study on the White Keys. (1923)
- Minuet in D minor. (1923)
- Valse. (1923)
- Toccata. (1924)
- Berceuse. (1935). 'For my wife'

=== Songs ===
- Shall I Compare (words, Shakespeare), for voice and piano. 'For my wife'.
- Three Songs (words, Edwin Stanley James. I 'Roundel', II 'Willowford', III 'Moulin Huet'), for voice and piano.
- Three Songs: A Lament (words, P. B. Shelley), Oh, Wert Thou in the Cauld Blast (words, Robert Burns), The Dying Adrian to his Soul (words, M. Prior), for voice and piano.
- Ah, Me! When shall I marry me? (words, Oliver Goldsmith), for voice and piano. (1934)
- Winter (words, Shakespeare), for soprano or tenor and piano. (1934) 'For my dear Wife'
- Cradle Song (words, Sarojini Naidu), for voice and piano. (1935)
- The Best is yet to be (words, Browning), No. 2 of 'Three Talks with God', for soprano and piano.
- Sleep, Holy Babe (words, Edward Caswall), for voice and piano. (1951) 'To my dear wife'.
- Wedding Song, (words, Shakespeare), for voice and organ. (1953) 'For Enid and Kenneth'.
- The "Caribbean" Lord's Prayer (traditional tune), No. 3 of 'Three Talks with God'.
- Komm Lieber Mai (words, A. Overbeck), for voice and piano. (1986)

=== Carols ===
- The Christmas Message.
- Good People All (words from The Oxford Book of Carols), for SATB. (1945)
- Lute-Book Lullaby, for soprano solo and unaccompanied choir. (1946)
- A Christmas Cradle Song (words, Watts), for soprano and piano. (1947)
- A Frosty Christmas Eve (Noel: Christmas Eve, 1913) (words, Robert Bridges), for soprano solo and piano.
- Masters in this Hall (words, Morris), for choir and piano. (1948). 'For my dear Wife'.
- Six Green Singers (words, Eleanor Farjeon), for soprano or tenor with piano. (1949)
- See, Amid the Winter's Snow (words, Edward Caswell) for soprano and piano. (1950)
- Two Nativity Preludes. No. 1 'The Jesus Birthday', for soprano and piano; No. 2 'Nativity Fanfare'

=== Sacred music ===
- The Office for the Holy Communion (including 'Benedictus Qui Venit' and 'Agnus Dei'), for treble, alto, tenor, bass and organ. (1923)

=== Music for schools ===
- Four Songs for Young People: ('Michael Finnigin', 'The Toad', 'The Kangaroo', 'The Ceremonial Band'), arranged for voices and school orchestra
- A Christmas Carol Suite ('Joys Seven', 'Bethlehem', 'No Room in the Inn'), arranged for junior school choir and orchestra. (1968)
- Trumpet Voluntary (Jeremiah Clarke), arranged for junior orchestra. (1971). 'To my Wife, E.G.H.'.
- Sir Nicketty Nox (words, Hugh Chesterman), for children's voices and piano. (1971).
- French Folk-songs, arranged for children's voices and school orchestra. (1974)
- British Folk Song Rhapsody ('Silver Jubilation'), arranged for children's voices, woodwind and piano. (1977) Commissioned by Middlesex Local Education Authority.
