= K (2002 film) =

- Directed by: Shoja Azari
- Written by: Shoja Azari; Franz Kafka (stories)
- Produced by: Shirin Neshat
- Starring: Oz Phillips; Mohammad Ghaffari; Rick Poli
- Cinematography: Ghasem Ebrahimian; Ben Wolf
- Edited by: Sam Neave; Andrew Sterling
- Production companies: A Parrot Prods. Inc. The 7th Floor
- Release date: 2002
- Running time: 85 minutes
- Country: United States
- Language: English

K is a 2002 film directed by the Iranian American multimedia artist Shoja Azari, based on three short stories by Franz Kafka - "The Married Couple," "In the Penal Colony" and "A Fratricide." - which are all performed by the same group of actors.

== Plot summary ==
The film moves from a salesman’s uneasy visit to an old client in The Married Couple, to a visitor watching an officer describe a punishment device in the story In the Penal Colony, and ends with the nighttime killing of a man and the reaction of those close to him in A Fratricide.

== Cast ==
- Oz Phillips – Robert / Explorer / Mr. Wese
- Mohammad Ghaffari – Father / Officer / Schmar
- Rick Poli – Sales Agent / Victim / Pallas
- Ann Parker – Mother
- Hamid Farjad – New Commandant
- Mitra Ghamsari – Mrs. Wese
- Shahram Karimi – Soldier

=== Crew ===
- Director/Writer: Shoja Azari
- Writer: Franz Kafka
- Executive Producer: Shirin Neshat
- Cinematography: Ghasem Ebrahimian, Ben Wolf
- Editing: Sam Neave, Andrew Sterling
- Production: A Parrot Prods. Inc., in association with The 7th Floor

== Production ==
K began as a 2000 project in which Shoja Azari made three Kafka-based short films. Tirgan states that the film was made during a period of collaboration between Azari and Shirin Neshat. It premiered at the Venice Film Festival in 2002.

== Review ==
Variety wrote that K combines three Kafka-based short films into a feature-length work, noting its black-and-white presentation, recurring cast, and the different pacing of each section. The review mentioned the film’s performances and visuals but described its tone as uneven, adding that its limited commercial potential might be offset by festival exposure.
