= Illusions & Mirrors =

- Film screenshot
- Directed by: Shirin Neshat
- Starring: Tarek Aylouch; Natalie Portman
- Cinematography: Darius Khondji
- Edited by: Nariman Hamed
- Production company: Viennale
- Distributed by: Sixpack Film (worldwide, all media)
- Release date: October 22, 2013 (Montreal Museum of Fine Arts)
- Running time: 2 minutes
- Country: United States
- Language: English

Illusions & Mirrors is a 2013 short film directed by Iranian-born American artist and filmmaker Shirin Neshat. The film, shot in black-and-white, stars Tarek Aylouch, Michael Markiewicz, and the Israeli-born American actress Natalie Portman. The film was commissioned by Dior, for which Portman is a spokesmodel, for the Miss Dior Expo at the Grand Palais, Paris. Shirin Neshat said that the film is a tribute to the black-and-white silent films made by such surrealist filmmakers as Man Ray, Jean Cocteau, Luis Buñuel, and Maya Deren.

== Plot ==
The film traces the delusions of a young woman, played by Natalie Portman. She is making futile attempts to follow a phantom travelling through the dunes of an empty sea beach, and, when it comes to an encounter in an abandoned house at the end, the woman finds a disturbing surprise.

== Cast ==
- Tarek Aylouch
- Michael Markiewicz
- Natalie Portman
