= Pasolini (film) =

2014 film

- Italian theatrical release poster
- Directed by: Abel Ferrara
- Written by: Maurizio Braucci
- Story by: Abel Ferrara; Nicola Tranquillino
- Produced by: Thierry Lounas; Conchita Airoldi; Joseph Rouschop
- Starring: Willem Dafoe; Ninetto Davoli; Riccardo Scamarcio; Valerio Mastandrea; Adriana Asti; Giada Colagrande; Maria de Medeiros
- Narrated by: Luca Lionello
- Cinematography: Stefano Falivene
- Edited by: Fabio Nunziata
- Production companies: Capricci Films; Urania Pictures; Tarantula; Dublin Films
- Distributed by: Capricci Films (France); Europictures (Italy)
- Release dates: 4 September 2014 (Venice); 25 September 2014 (Italy); 31 December 2014 (France)
- Running time: 84 minutes
- Countries: France; Italy; Belgium
- Languages: English; Italian; French

Pasolini is a 2014 biographical drama film directed by Abel Ferrara and written by Maurizio Braucci about the final days of Italian film director Pier Paolo Pasolini (played by Willem Dafoe). It was selected to compete for the Golden Lion at the 71st Venice International Film Festival. It was also screened in the Special Presentations section of the 2014 Toronto International Film Festival.

== Plot ==
Pier Paolo Pasolini (Willem Dafoe) is fifty-three, and lives in the rowdy Rome of the 1970s. He has just finished shooting his latest film Salò, or the 120 Days of Sodom, a film that has shocked both critics and audiences. Pasolini is increasingly opposed by the people, critics, and politicians, both for his homosexuality, and because he is considered impulsive and scandalous in showing his reality to the public. Pasolini is going to shoot a new film (which was never made), in which he cast Eduardo De Filippo (Ninetto Davoli) and Ninetto Davoli (Riccardo Scamarcio) - with whom he has a special relationship. While Pasolini is working on the film, his mother (Adriana Asti) and his cousin try to dissuade him from the project, because it would be too wild and visionary for the Italian public to accept.

Pasolini continues with his work, missing many interviews with journalists. He begins a relationship with a boy from the suburbs of Rome, Pino Pelosi, and takes him to a restaurant in the seaside village of Ostia. Pasolini wants to be with him in a loving relationship, but the boy becomes angry with him, attacking him and some other companions. Pasolini is later beaten up and then run over with his own car. In the days following, the press says Pasolini's murder was politically motivated by the police and those whom the poet had always loved and immortalized in his works.

== Cast ==
- Willem Dafoe as Pier Paolo Pasolini
- Ninetto Davoli as Eduardo De Filippo
- Riccardo Scamarcio as Ninetto Davoli
- Valerio Mastandrea as Domenico "Nico" Naldini
- Adriana Asti as Susanna Colussi Pasolini
- Giada Colagrande as Graziella Chiarcossi
- Salvatore Ruocco as Socialist politician
- Maria de Medeiros as Laura Betti
- Francesco Siciliano as Furio Colombo
- Luca Lionello as narrator

== Production ==
According to Ferrara, his plans to make a film about Pasolini go as far back as the 1990s. Originally, the project was not meant to have been an actual biopic of Pasolini's life. Instead, it was to have starred Zoë Tamerlis Lund as "a female director living the life that Pasolini lived." However, Lund's death prevented this idea.

== Reception ==
On the review aggregation website Rotten Tomatoes, the film has a 78% approval rating, based on 55 reviews, with a weighted average of 6.8/10. The website's consensus reads, "Pasolini may frustrate viewers seeking a straightforward biopic, but director Abel Ferrara's unconventional approach is well-matched by Willem Dafoe's performance." On Metacritic, the film has a score of 71 out of 100, based on 18 critics.
