= Before It Had a Name =

- Film poster
- Directed by: Giada Colagrande
- Written by: Giada Colagrande; Willem Dafoe
- Produced by: Brian Bell; Rita Capasa; Randall Emmett; Frank Frattaroli; George Furla; Avi Lerner
- Starring: Giada Colagrande; Willem Dafoe; Seymour Cassel
- Cinematography: Ken Kelsch; Brian Pryzpek
- Edited by: Natalie Cristiani
- Music by: Ashley Waldron
- Production companies: Bidou Pictures; Canary Films; Emmett/Furla Films; In Between Pictures; Millennium Films; Nu Image Films
- Distributed by: First Look International
- Release date: September 2005 (Venice Film Festival)
- Running time: 101 minutes
- Country: United States
- Language: English
- Budget: $450,000

Before It Had a Name is a 2005 film directed by Giada Colagrande and co-written by her and husband Willem Dafoe. The film premiered at the Venice Film Festival and was retitled as The Black Widow when it was released on DVD. It marked the first time Dafoe had developed a project to the point of being shot as well as the first time Colagrande had written in English.

== Synopsis ==
After her lover Karl dies, Eleonora goes to his New York estate known as 'The Rubber House' in hopes of learning about him. While there, she becomes involved with the property's strange caretaker, Leslie.

== Principal cast ==
Actor	Role
Willem Dafoe	Leslie
Giada Colagrande	Eleonora
Seymour Cassel	Jeff
Isaach de Bankolé	Waiter
Emily Cass McDonnell	Gail
Claudio Botosso	Karl
Bari Hyman	LP

== Critical reception ==
Boyd Van Hoei wrote in Cineuropa:

With its narrow focus on two people in a passionate relationship and its abundant use of metaphors, the film certainly has more in common with the intimate auteur dramas of the old continent than with new American cinema... Whatever the reaction of American audiences will be, Before It Had a Name is certainly amongst the most pleasing – and decidedly auteur – surprises of the Venice Days.
