= Claudio Botosso =

Italian actor (born 1958)

- Born: 28 March 1958 (age 68); Biella, Italy
- Occupation: Actor
- Years active: 1985-present
- Height: 1.78 m (5 ft 10 in)

Claudio Botosso (born 28 March 1958) is an Italian actor. He appeared in more than forty films since 1985.

== Selected filmography ==
Year	Title	Role	Notes
1985	Bank Clerks	Luigi	
1985	Ginger and Fred		
1986	Grandi magazzini	Roberto	
1986	Il tenente dei carabinieri		
1986	Devil in the Flesh		
1987	Under the Chinese Restaurant	Ivan	
1987	Soldati - 365 all'alba		
1989	The Story of Boys & Girls	Taddeo	
1990	Mal d'Africa		
1993	Bonus malus	The doctor	
1994	Italia Village		
1996	Italiani	Nino	
1997	Il figlio di Bakunin	Ulisse	
2000	Senza paura		
2002	Open My Heart	Giovanni	
2003	Prendimi e portami via	Avv. Antonini	
2005	Before It Had a Name		
2007	My Brother Is an Only Child	Professor Montagna	
2008	Pietralata		
2009	The Friends at the Margherita Cafe	Zanchi	
2012	La moglie del sarto		
2014	Dolce di latte	Edoardo	
2016	Seconda primavera	Andrea	
2018	Yutopia		
2019	A mano disarmata		
