= Giada Colagrande =

Italian director and actress (born 1975)

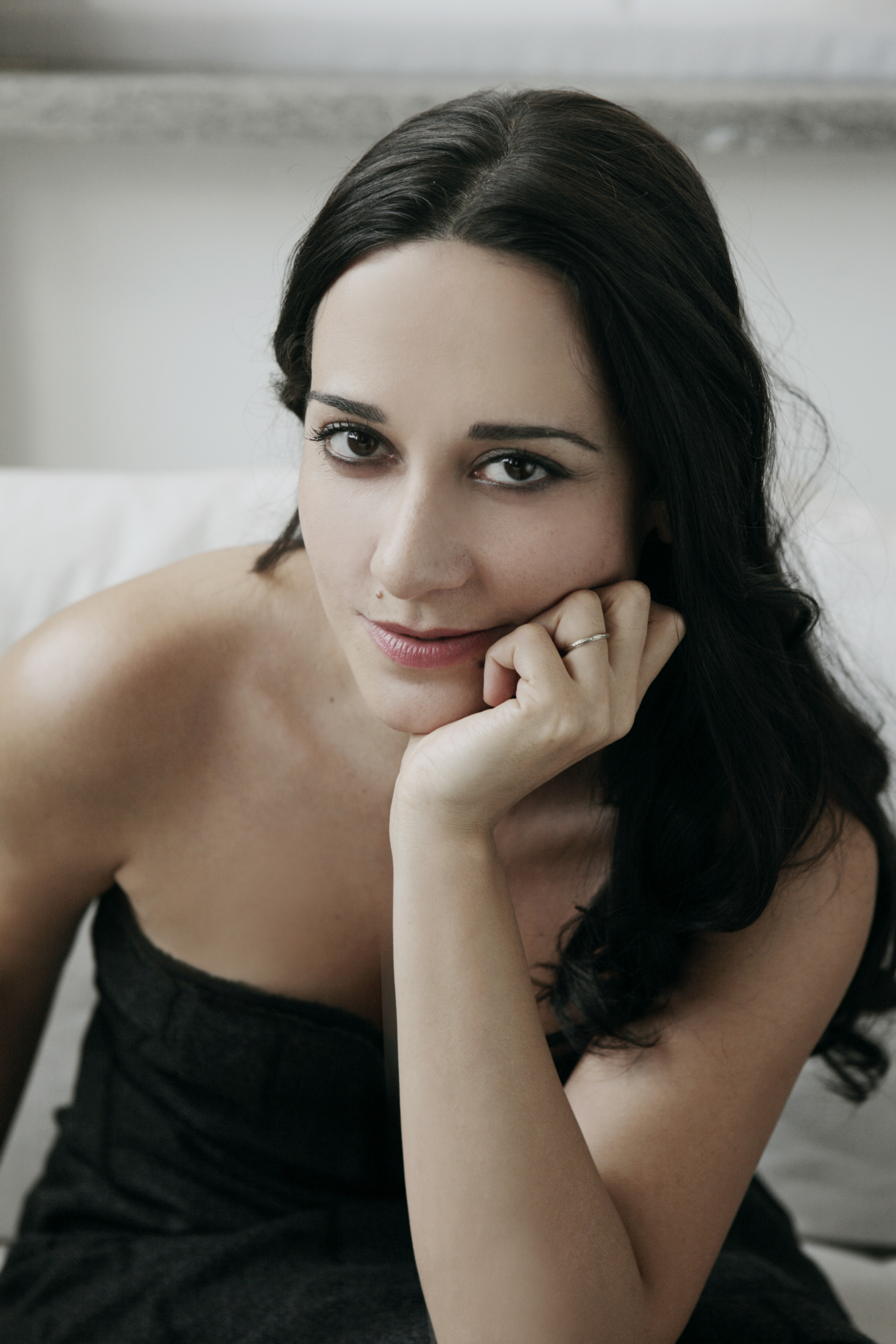
- Colagrande in 2010

Background information
- Also known as: AGADEZ
- Born: 16 October 1975 (age 50); Pescara, Italy
- Occupations: Director; writer; actress; composer; singer-songwriter
- Years active: 1998–present
- Spouse: Willem Dafoe (m. 2005)

Giada Colagrande (born 16 October 1975) is an Italian film director, screenwriter and actress. Under the pseudonym AGADEZ, she makes music as a composer and singer-songwriter. She is married to the American actor Willem Dafoe.

== Career ==
In 2001, she wrote, directed, and starred in her first feature film, Open My Heart. Premiered at the Venice Film Festival 2002, the film was later selected by several international film festivals, including the Tribeca Film Festival 2003 (New York) and Paris Cinéma 2003, where it received the Prix de l’Avenir. Colagrande was also nominated for the Nastro d'Argento 2003 as Best New Director. Aprimi il cuore was distributed in Italy by Lucky Red and in the United States by Strand Releasing.

Her second feature film, Before It Had a Name (2005), was co-written with and co-starred Willem Dafoe. It premiered at the Venice Film Festival 2005, the San Sebastián International Film Festival, and other international festivals. It was distributed in the United States, Italy, and internationally by Millennium under the title Black Widow.

In 2010, she wrote and directed her third feature film, A Woman, starring Willem Dafoe, Jess Weixler, and Stefania Rocca. It was presented at the Venice Film Festival 2010 and in many other international film festivals.

In 2012, she directed The Woman Dress, the third short film in the Miu Miu Women's Tales series, a project by PRADA, and completed Bob Wilson's Life & Death of Marina Abramovic, a documentary about a theatrical work by Robert Wilson based on the biography of Marina Abramović, featuring Willem Dafoe, Antony Hegarty, and Abramović herself. Both films premiered at the Venice Film Festival 2012. Bob Wilson's Life & Death of Marina Abramovic was later screened at the MoMA in New York and the Louvre Museum in Paris.

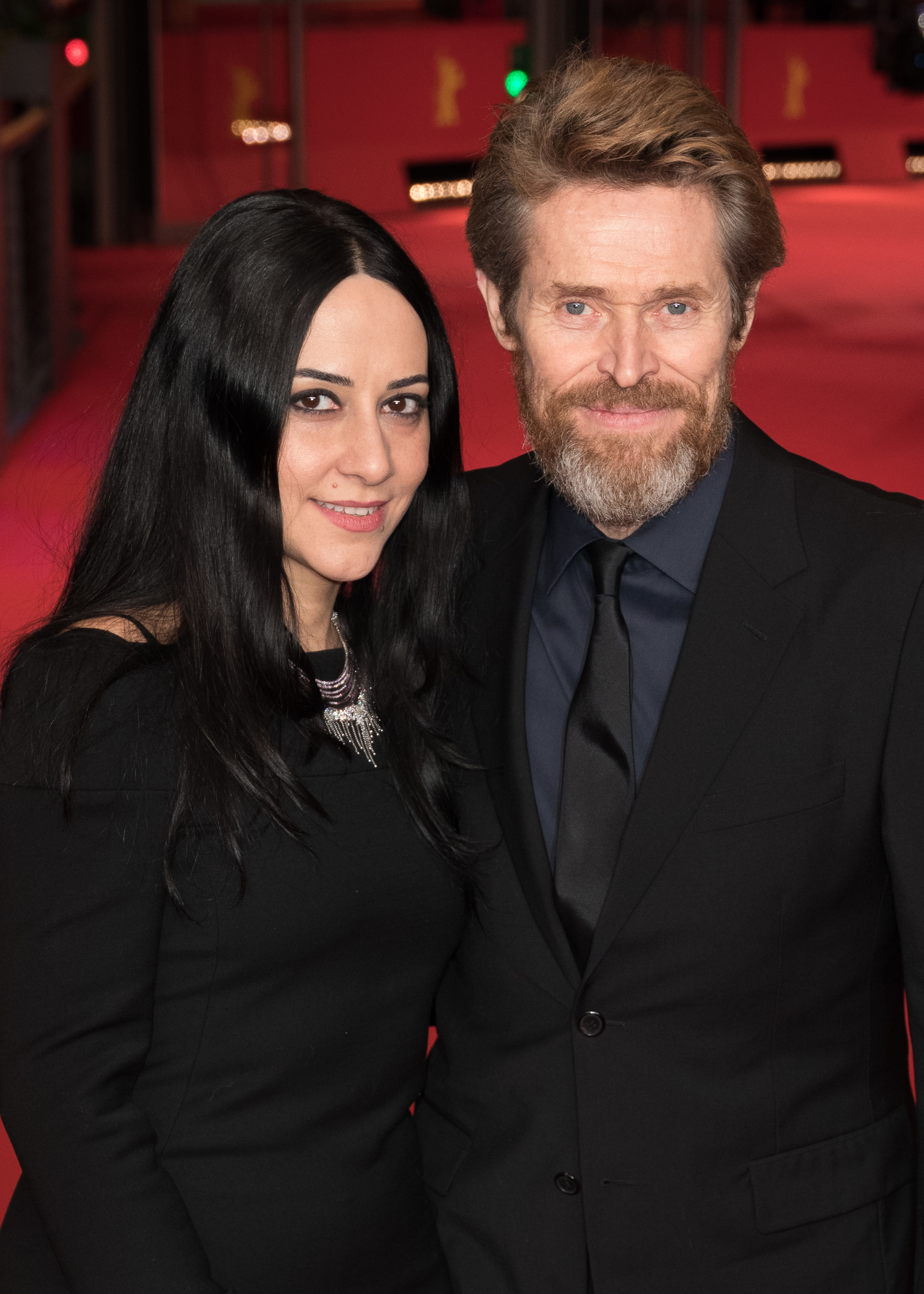
Colagrande and husband Willem Dafoe in 2018

In 2013, she presented The Abramović Method, continuing her collaboration with the performance artist Marina Abramović, at the Venice Film Festival. The film has continued to be screened in contemporary art museums worldwide.

In 2016, she wrote, directed, and starred in Padre, alongside Franco Battiato, Willem Dafoe, and Marina Abramović. The film premiered at the Morelia International Film Festival (Mexico) and participated in numerous other international festivals. It was distributed in various countries, including Mexico, China, and the United States.

A retrospective of her work was held in 2017 by the Lucca Film Festival and in 2018 at the Roxy Cinema Tribeca in New York.

As an actress, Colagrande also appeared in Pasolini by Abel Ferrara (2014) and in Wes Anderson's short film Castello Cavalcanti (2014).

In 2017, Colagrande debuted as a singer and songwriter, writing lyrics and composing music for the project The Magic Door. In 2023, she began her solo music career as a singer-songwriter and composer under the pseudonym AGADEZ. Her debut album, Queendoms (2024), was followed by Queendoms Unplugged (2025), the first collaboration with internationally acclaimed composer and guitarist Antonio Forcione.

== Personal life ==
On 25 March 2005, she married actor Willem Dafoe, whom she met in Rome during the filming of The Life Aquatic with Steve Zissou by Wes Anderson.

== Filmography ==
=== Director and screenwriter ===
- Open My Heart (2002)
- Black Widow (Before It Had a Name) (2005)
- Una donna – A Woman (A Woman) (2010)
- Padre (2016)
- Tropico (TBA)

=== Actress ===
- Open My Heart (2002)
- Black Widow (Before It Had a Name) (2005)
- Castello Cavalcanti, directed by Wes Anderson — short film (2014)
- Pasolini, directed by Abel Ferrara (2014)
- Padre (2016)

=== Short films and documentaries ===
- Volume (7 Portraits of Contemporary Artists) — documentary (1997/99)
- Carnaval — short film (1998)
- Fetus – Quattro porta morto — short film (1999)
- N. 3 — short film (2000)
- The Woman Dress — short film (2012)
- Bob Wilson's Life & Death of Marina Abramović — documentary (2012)
- The Abramović Method — documentary (2013)

=== Credits ===
- Open My Heart (2002)
- Before It Had a Name (2005)
- A Woman (2010)
- Bob Wilson's Life & Death of Marina Abramović (2012)
- The Abramovic Method (2013)
- Castello Cavalcanti (2013)
- Pasolini (2014)
- Padre (2016)
- Tropico (TBA)
