= Castello Cavalcanti =

2013 short film by Wes Anderson

- Directed by: Wes Anderson
- Written by: Wes Anderson
- Produced by: Roman Coppola; Jeremy Dawson; Julie Sawyer
- Starring: Jason Schwartzman; Giada Colagrande
- Cinematography: Darius Khondji
- Edited by: Stephen Perkins
- Distributed by: Prada
- Release date: November 13, 2013
- Running time: 8 minutes
- Countries: United States; Italy
- Languages: English; Italian

Castello Cavalcanti is a 2013 short film written and directed by Wes Anderson, starring Jason Schwartzman as an unsuccessful race car driver who crashes his car in an Italian village. The 8-minute film was filmed at Cinecittà in Rome, Italy and financed by Prada. It debuted at the Rome Film Festival and was released online on November 13, 2013. It quickly became popular and received critical acclaim.

== Plot ==
In a quiet Italian village in 1955, Italian-American Formula One driver Jed Cavalcanti (Jason Schwartzman), who is struggling in last place in a race through the countryside, crashes his car in the middle of the public square. Irritated with his situation, he abandons his car, blames the malfunctions on his brother-in-law (who is also his mechanic), and waits for the next bus out of town, which is set to arrive in 20 minutes. However, after sharing a drink with the villagers, he discovers that he is in his ancestral homeland, "Castello Cavalcanti", and that several members of his company are his "ancestors". After a friendly phone call with his brother-in-law, he soon decides to skip the next bus and spend more time in town.

== Allusions to Italian cinema ==
Anderson alludes to some classic Italian films in the short, including several by Federico Fellini, such as La Dolce Vita (1960) and Amarcord (1973).
