= James Lockhart (conductor) =

Scottish conductor, pianist and organist (1930–2025)

- Born: James Lawrence Lockhart; 16 October 1930; Edinburgh, Scotland
- Died: 26 February 2025 (aged 94)
- Education: University of Edinburgh; Royal College of Music
- Occupations: Conductor; pianist; organist; répétiteur
- Years active: 1950s–1990s
- Style: Classical
- Spouse: Sheila Grogan (m. 1954)
- Children: 3

James Lawrence Lockhart (16 October 1930 – 26 February 2025) was a Scottish conductor, pianist and organist.

== Biography ==
Lockhart was born on 16 October 1930 in Edinburgh, the son of Mary Lockhart (née Lawrence), a school teacher prior to her marriage, and Archibald Lockhart, an inspector of weights and measures. He was educated at George Watson's College and subsequently studied music at the University of Edinburgh. He continued his musical education at the Royal College of Music (RCM), where he met Sheila Grogan, a cello student. Lockhart and Grogan married in 1954. The couple had three children: Fiona, Andrew and Anthony.

In March 1954, Lockhart gave the first UK performance of Frank Martin's "Sonata da Chiesa for Viola d'Amore and Organ" at All Souls Church, Langham Place, with the violist Harry Danks. He worked as a répétiteur (singing coach) at the Städtische Bühnen Münster, Germany, from 1955 to 1956. He conducted the premiere of William Walton's The Bear at the Aldeburgh Festival in 1967.

Lockhart was music director of Welsh National Opera from 1968 to 1973. From 1972 to 1980, he was Generalmusikdirektor (GMD) of the Staatstheater Kassel, the first British conductor to be GMD of a German opera company. His work in Kassel included a rare German performance of The Yeomen of the Guard in October 1972.

Lockhart was director of opera at the RCM from 1986 to 1992. He appeared as a castaway on the BBC Radio programme Desert Island Discs on 18 April 1970.

Lockhart died from complications of dementia on 26 February 2025, aged 94. His widow, Sheila, and their daughter, Fiona, survived him. The couple's two sons, Anthony and Andrew, predeceased their father.

Cultural offices
Preceded by Bryan Balkwill	Music Director, Welsh National Opera; 1968–1973	Succeeded by Richard Armstrong
Preceded by Gerd Albrecht	Generalmusikdirektor, Staatstheater Kassel; 1972–1980	Succeeded by Woldemar Nelsson
