= Peter Schuyff =

American painter

Peter Schuyff (born 1958 in Baarn, Netherlands) is an internationally exhibited Dutch-born American painter, musician and sculptor. In 1967 he moved with his family to Vancouver, Canada. Schuyff's mother was an artist and his father a professor of economics at Simon Fraser University. Schuyff became fascinated with the radical views of the art world in the 1960s and 70s and especially with such famous figures as Andy Warhol and Willem de Kooning. He was raised in Canada and was schooled in art at the Vancouver School of Art.

During the 1980s Schuyff moved to Manhattan's East Village and along with artists such as Ashley Bickerton, Jerry Brown, David Burdeny, Catharine Burgess, Marjan Eggermont, Paul Kuhn, Eve Leader, Daniel Ong and Tanya Rusnak became part of the Neo-Geo movement in art. Schuyff's work is included in the collections of MOMA, New York; Metropolitan Museum, New York; MOCA, Los Angeles; Moderna Museet, Stockholm, Sweden; Broad Museum, Los Angeles; Dakis Joannou Collection; The Fisher Landau foundation; Portland Art Museum, Portland; Spencer Museum of Art, Kansas, US and was included in the famed art collection of Herbert and Dorothy Vogel.

Schuyff's work was exhibited as part of the 2014 Whitney Biennial.

Schuyff married the artist Elliott Puckette in 1989. They eventually divorced.
