= Factory Girl (2013 film) =

- Film poster
- Directed by: Mohamed Khan
- Story by: Wessam Soliman
- Produced by: Mohamed Samir; Ahmed Youssef (executive producer)
- Starring: Yasmin Raeis; Hany Adel; Salwa Khattab
- Edited by: Dina Farouk
- Release dates: 8 December 2013 (Dubai); 19 March 2014 (Egypt)
- Country: Egypt
- Language: Arabic

Factory Girl (Arabic: فتاة المصنع, Fataat El Masnaa) is an Egyptian romantic drama film directed by Mohamed Khan. The film premiered at the Dubai International Film Festival in December 2013. It was selected as the Egyptian entry for the Best Foreign Language Film at the 87th Academy Awards, but was not nominated.

== Plot ==
21-year-old Hiyam (Yasmin Raeis) is an impoverished worker in a Cairo textile factory. When Salah (Hany Adel), the factory's new supervisor, becomes attracted to her and a pregnancy comes into play, Hiyam sees an opportunity to take control of her own fate and to move up in the world. But there is a very high price to pay.

== Production ==
The film was funded by DIFF's Enjaaz fund, the Abu Dhabi Film Festival's SANAD fund, the Global Film Initiative, Women in Film Foundation, German's GIZ institution and the Egyptian Ministry of Culture's Filmmaking Fund. Cinematography was done by the Egyptian Mahmoud Lotfi, who previously gained notoriety for his work on Coming Forth by Day.

== Cast ==
- Yasmin Raeis as Hiyam
- Hany Adel as Salah
- Salwa Khattab as Hiyam's Mother
- Salwa Mohammad Ali as Hiyam's aunt Samra

== See also ==
- List of submissions to the 87th Academy Awards for Best Foreign Language Film
- List of Egyptian submissions for the Academy Award for Best International Feature Film
