= Looking for Oum Kulthum =

2017 film by Shirin Neshat

- Film poster
- Directed by: Shirin Neshat; Shoja Azari
- Written by: Shirin Neshat; Shoja Azari
- Starring: Yasmin Raeis; Neda Rahmanian
- Release dates: 2 September 2017 (Venice); 29 March 2018 (Germany)
- Running time: 90 minutes
- Countries: Germany; Austria; Italy; Lebanon; Qatar
- Languages: English; Persian; Egyptian Arabic

Looking for Oum Kulthum is a 2017 internationally co-produced drama film about the Egyptian diva Umm Kulthum, directed by Shirin Neshat in collaboration with Shoja Azari. It was screened in the Contemporary World Cinema section at the 2017 Toronto International Film Festival.

== About the film ==
The story is revolved on the life and music of Egyptian singer. The female singer struggled to make it in a male-dominated society. Her weakness and determination pushed her to fame. However, there are various descriptions of the film. TRT, described it as “the story of Mitra, an Iranian-born director living in exile, who dreams of making a film dedicated to legendary Egyptian singer Oum Kulthum.” TRT also stated that “Shirin Neshat has brought the diva’s story to the screen, with personal touches.” Enterprise stated “Looking for Oum Kulthum is about “the power of art to move a people." It was also described as “a film within a film.” It is 90 minutes film with the approval age of viewers from 15 years with parental guidance as it contains adult themes. It was subtitled in English.

=== Costume ===
One of the viewers delight was the selection of the wardrobe of the actresses. In the words of What Women Want Magazine “the movie also witnesses a mesmerizing selection of incredible gowns from Oum Kulthum’s iconic wardrobe, designed by the talented Italian costume designer Mariano Tufano. The designer was given 8 weeks to design hundreds of dresses for the characters and 350 dresses were made with initiatives from six different decades. According to Vogue Arabi, “While most of the clothes were custom-made in Tufano’s Casablanca workshops, there were hordes of extras who needed ensembles too. The costume designer and his staff collected their images of old Egypt, and traversed around London, Rome, and Marrakech for shoes, accessories, and jewelry. Tufano sought assistance from Gerardo Sacco, a popular Italian jeweler, to help recreate the unique diamond earrings Kulthum was known to spot.”

== Special exhibitions, unveiling and screening ==
Looking for Oum Kulthum” was unveiled at the Venice Film Festival in 2017. It was also exhibited by the Association Azzedine Alaïa at the Paris Photo Week. It featured eight photographs of the film of Oum Kulthum portraits. These included the frontal and the striking images that attempt to capture the mythical nature of this famous Egyptian diva. Each carried the title of one of Oum Kulthum’s songs. It was written with ink in Arabic calligraphy.

It was screened at the Dublin Arabic Film Festival 2018.

Looking for Oum Kulthum was selected as one of the 34 Arabic films for the festival’s 2nd edition.

It was approved to be featured in April 23, 2017 at the Zamalek Cinema during the year's "Cairo Cinema Days" festival.

It was one of the 12 films globally selected at the 74th Venice International Film Festival (30 August-9 September).

A lecture on the film was given at the Hall Piper Auditorium of the Harvard University Graduate School of Design Hall Piper Auditorium. It was a free and open lecture that lasted from 06:30PM – 08:00PM on 28 November 2018.

It was screened at the Hammer Museum of Otis College of Art and Design under the summer residency series.

== Critics ==
As much as the film was featured in many event and festivals, it attracted criticisms which included multiple inaccuracies which stated that the Director Neshat wrote from her own perception instead of from the real Oum Kulthum’s life. Again was that Oum Kulthum had never appeared in short sleeve dresses and had a perfect voice that never choked. But the film portrayed the opposite. Another was on the home town of Oum Kulthum which the critics said was not backward as was shown in the film.

== Cast ==
- Yasmin Raeis as Ghada.
- Neda Rahmanian as Mitra.
- Mehdi Moinzadeh as Amir.
- Kais Nashef as Ahmad/Latif
