= Neo-minimalism =

Art movement

Neo-minimalism is an amorphous art movement of the late 20th and early 21st centuries. It has alternatively been called Neo-Geometric or "Neo-Geo" art. Other terms include: Neo-Conceptualism, Neo-Futurism, Neo-Op, Neo-pop, New Abstraction, Poptometry, Post-Abstractionism, and Smart Art.

== Origins ==
As a product of the modernist movement of the 1960s, it was influenced by the Bauhaus style of art which rejected lavish designs for a more down-to-earth approach.

== Arts ==
The aspects of "postmodern art" that have been described as neo-minimalism (and related terms) involve a general "reevaluation of earlier art forms."

Contemporary artists who have been linked to the term, or who have been included in shows employing it, include Peter Halley, Philip Taaffe, Lorenzo Belenguer, Ashley Bickerton, David Burdeny, Paul Kuhn, DoDoU, Eve Leader, Peter Schuyff, Christopher Willard and Tim Zuck. The steel sculptures of Richard Serra have been described as "austere neo-Minimalism...."

=== Design and music ===
Beyond painting, sculpture and other "museum art," the term has been applied to architecture, design, and music. In architecture, indeed, neo-minimalism has been identified as a part of "the new orthodoxy...." As Finnish author Juhani Pallasmaa stated: "After the bacchanal of post-modernism, the time has again come for neo-minimalism, neo-ascetism, neo-denial and sublime poverty."

== See also ==
- Minimalism
- Remodernism
- Flat design
