= Wust El-Balad =

Egyptian music band

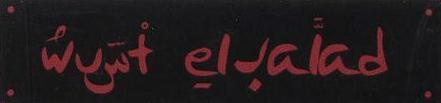
- Origin: Cairo, Egypt
- Genres: Soft rock
- Years active: 1999–present
- Members: Ahmed Omran; Hany Adel; Adham El-Said; Mizo; Ahmed Omar; Asaad Nessim; Bob

Wust El-Balad (Arabic: وسط البلد) is an Egyptian soft rock band, founded in Cairo in 1999. The band released four albums, the self-titled Wust El-Balad in 2007, Rubabekya in 2011, Karakib in 2014, and Bantalony El Jeans in 2018.

Songs by Hany Adel of Wust El-Balad were popular during the 2011 Egyptian revolution. On 10 January 2011, the band performed four songs during the "Microphone for Alex" solidarity concert, including "Shams El-Nahar" (Morning Sun), "Hela Hop" (Let's Go), and "A'm Mina", as well as "Rubabekya" (Junk), the title track from their second album.

== Members ==
Co-founders

- Ahmed Omran – oud and flute
- Hany Adel – guitar and vocals

Other members

- Adham El-Said – (Vocals).
- Mohammed Gamal El-Din – nicknamed Mizo – percussion and drums
- Ahmed Omer – Bass
- Asaad Nessim – acoustic guitar
- Ehab Abdel-Hameed – nicknamed Bob – percussions

== Discography ==
=== Albums ===
- Wust El-Balad (2007)
- Rubabekya (2011)
- Karakib (2014)
