= Harry Danks =

British violist (1912–2001)

- Born: Samuel Henry Danks; 18 May 1912; Pensnett, Worcestershire, England
- Died: 26 April 2001 (aged 88) Cambridge, England
- Genre: Classical
- Occupations: Musician, professor, author
- Instrument: Viola
- Formerly of: BBC Symphony Orchestra, The London Consort of Viols, City of Birmingham Orchestra, The London Octet

Harry Danks (1912-2001) was a British violist and principal viola of the BBC Symphony Orchestra from 1946 to 1978. He was the founder and director of the London Consort of Viols.

== Biography ==
Harry Danks was born in Pensnett near Bridgnorth in Worcestershire, England, on 18 May 1912, the eldest of three sons born to Samuel Henry and Elizabeth Icke.

His early music lessons on the violin were given by two uncles and he then sought lessons with the leader of the City of Birmingham Orchestra (CBO), Paul Beard. His early career was playing in silent film and variety theatres.

After tuition from Beard, Danks became a pupil of Alfred Cave who arranged for Danks to play for Leslie Heward, the conductor of the CBO, who offered Danks a violin position in the orchestra. Danks became a violist in the orchestra in 1935, and began having lessons with Lionel Tertis. In 1936, Danks married Leonora (Nora) Shrimpton, a pianist he met when they were playing in a cinema orchestra. He had a brief period with the Bournemouth Symphony Orchestra before being offered a position with the BBC Symphony Orchestra in 1937. He played with the BBCSO until his retirement in September 1978.

When war broke out Danks joined the Royal Regiment of Artillery and was stationed in Herefordshire, attaining the rank of Sergeant. He became leader of the Western Command Symphony Orchestra and played the Mendelssohn and Bruch Violin Concertos in Chester Cathedral.

Once the war had ended, Danks returned to London in 1946 and was offered the principal viola position with the BBCSO, under Sir Adrian Boult. Under Boult and the BBCSO, he performed the Walton Viola Concerto in May 1949 and gave first performances of many viola concertos including those by Quincy Porter (1952), Graham Whettam (1956), Boris Blacher (1959), Mario Zafred (1961), Gordon Jacob (revised version 1977), Hilding Rosenberg and Hans Henkemans.

He gave many first performances including the Sonata da Chiesa for viola and organ by Frank Martin in May 1954 at All Souls Church in Langham Place with the organist James Lockhart. Also in 1954 he premiered the Sonata for Viola and Piano by John Prideaux-Brune with Robert Collett. In 1964 he was amongst the instrumental ensemble who gave the first performance of Peter Maxwell Davies's Shakespeare Music.

At a concert in the Wigmore Hall on 1 January 1977, to commemorate Lionel Tertis's centenary, Danks, along with other members of the viola section of the BBCSO gave first performances of three works: Edmund Rubbra's Meditation on a Byzantine Hymn for two violas; John Wray's Suite for 6 Violas and Gordon Jacob's Suite for 8 Violas.

He gave the first broadcast performances of many other works, including Giorgio Frederico Ghedini's Pezzo Concertante for two violins, (Paul Beard and Thomas Peatfield), viola and orchestra in 1950. The work was conducted by Igor Markevitch; the Duet Rhapsody for Soprano and Viola by Kenneth Harding (1953), Pamela Petts was the soprano soloist; Also in 1953, Benjamin Dale's Introduction and Andante for Six Violas, performed by: Danks, Zingra Bunbury, Stanley Wotton, Kenneth Harding, Sheila Spencer and Joan Wolstencroft; In September 1955, Sonata for Viola and Piano by Horace Somerville; In December 1955, The Death of Tintagiles for orchestra and viola d'Amore by Charles Martin Loeffler; the Prelude, Aria and Finale for viola d'Amore and chamber orchestra by Leighton Lucas in 1956 and Four Pieces for solo viola by Frank Stiles (1984).

He was a soloist at several BBC Henry Wood Promenade Concerts. In July 1947 he performed Richard Strauss's Don Quixote with the cellist Zara Nelsova. He performed the same work in July of the following year with the cellist Paul Tortelier. In August 1949 he performed Hector Berlioz's Harold in Italy, Op 16, with the BBC under the conductor Malcolm Sargent. Again, under Sargent and the BBCSO, he performed Ralph Vaughan Williams' Flos Campi in January 1950. In August 1958 at the Royal Albert Hall he performed Don Quixote by Richard Strauss with the cellist Pierre Fournier. In August 1959 he performed the same work with the cellist Erling Blöndal Bengtsson. He performed Don Quixote once again in September 1962 with the cellist János Starker, with a further performance at the 1964 Proms with Mstislav Rostropovich which was recorded and released on the BBC Legends Label.

As well as his orchestral and consort playing, he played throughout England in a number of ensembles such as the London Octet, The London Harpsichord Ensemble, The Herbert Downes Quartet, The Amati String Quartet, The Laurance Turner String Quartet and The Armada Orchestra. He was the founder (in 1948) and director of the London Consort of Viols which played and broadcast regularly from 1949 to 1965.

He published two editions of his book, The Viola D'Amore, in 1976 and an enlarged edition in 1979.

He was Professor of Viola at the Guildhall School of music from 1978 to 1981.

Danks's daughter Ysobel was a violinist in the BBCSO and was married to the cellist Alexander Kok. Danks's son Eugene was also a violinist and conductor, once conducting Danks in a performance of Harold in Italy.

Two years after the death of Lionel Tertis, Danks was asked by Lionel Tertis's widow, Lillian Tertis to form a committee to organize a competition and festival in Tertis's memory. The Lionel Tertis International Viola Competition has taken place every three years at the Port Erin Arts Centre on the Isle of Man since its inception in 1980. Harry Danks sat on the judging panel of the competition in 1980, 1988 and 1991.

Danks played on a viola made by Amati of Cremona in 1615, known as the 'Stauffer'. He also played on a 1750 Eberle viola d’Amore once owned by Louis van Waefelghem.

Harry Danks died on 26 April 2001. After his death, his daughter Ysobel gave to the violist John White (a pupil of Danks), a large collection of music which had belonged to Lionel Tertis. In a piano score of the Walton Viola Concerto is an inscription : 'To Harry Danks, a most sincere player of the viola to whom I wish all success. Lionel Tertis 1 March 1937'.
