= Shoja Azari =

Iranian visual artist and filmmaker

- شجاع آذری
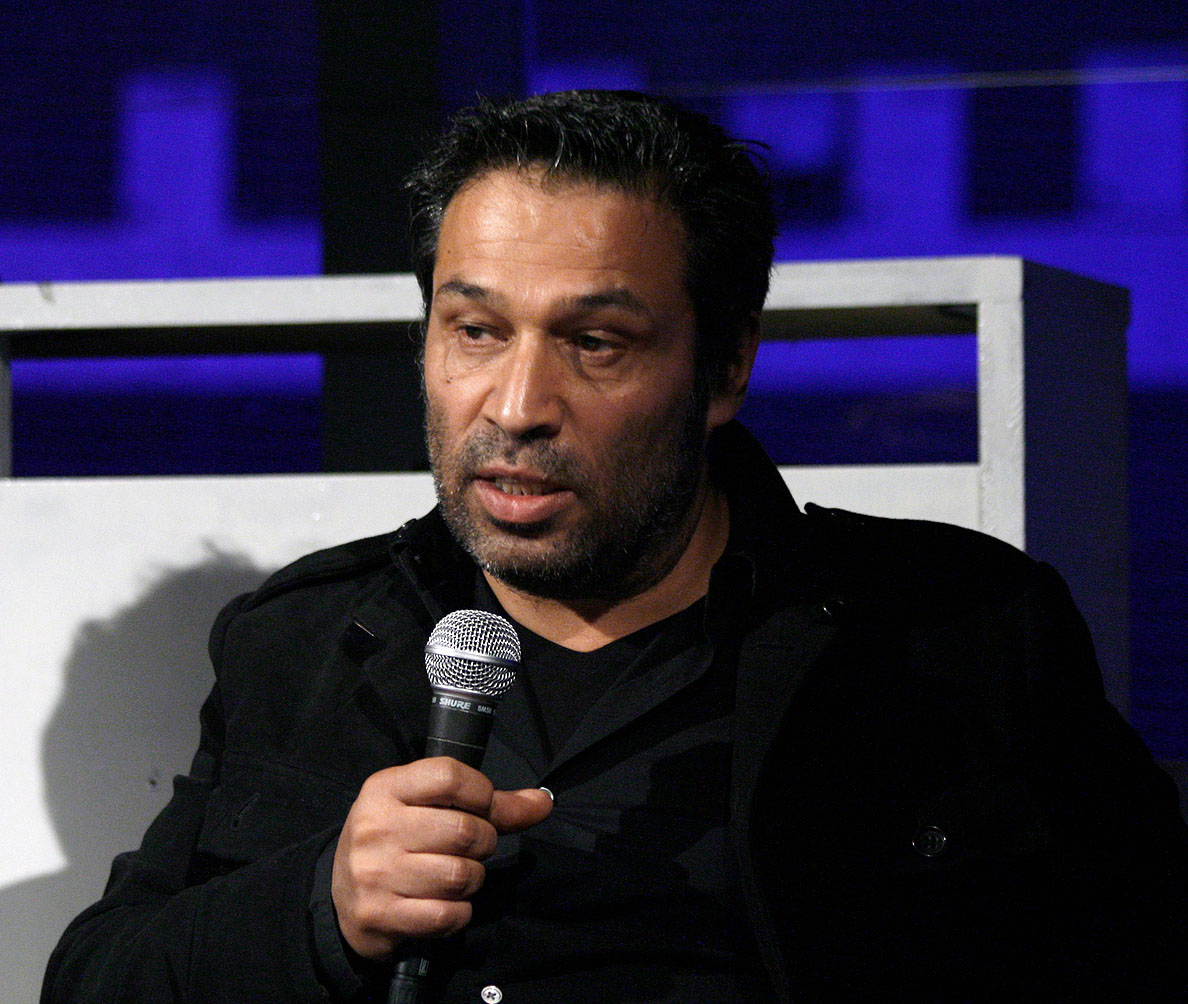
- Azari in 2009
- Born: 18 September 1957 (age 67); Shiraz, Iran
- Occupations: Artist; filmmaker; photographer

Shoja Azari (Persian: شجاع آذری) is an Iranian-born visual artist and filmmaker based in New York City. He is known for his films and multimedia installations.

== Early life and education ==
Azari was born in Shiraz, Iran. Azari trained as a filmmaker in New York in the 1970s before returning to Iran during the Iranian Revolution in 1979. He then permanently returned to the U.S. In 1997, he first met artist Shirin Neshat when she was assembling a team to create her first video, “Turbulent”. Azari and Neshat became artistic and romantic partners. He is divorced and has one son, Johnny B. Azari, a musician.

== Film ==
Azari is known for films such as Women Without Men (2009), Windows (2006), and K (2002). These were based on three of Franz Kafka's short stories: "The Married Couple", "In the Penal Colony", and "A Fratricide", respectively. He co-directed with Neshat the film Land of Dreams (2021), which won the Golden Peacock Award at the 52nd International Film Festival of India.

== Multimedia installations and art ==
According to Carol Kino of The New York Times, Azari's "multimedia installations have been increasingly showcased in galleries and museums around the world." His first solo exhibition in New York occurred in 2010 at the Leila Taghinia-Milani Heller Gallery. His video installation work, Idyllic Life (2012), was part of the exhibition In the Fields of Empty Days: The Intersection of Past and Present in Iranian Art (2018) at the Los Angeles County Museum of Art.

== See also ==
- Iranian modern and contemporary art
- List of Iranian Americans
- List of Iranian artists
