= Shirin Neshat =

Iranian artist, film director, and photographer

- شیرین نشاط
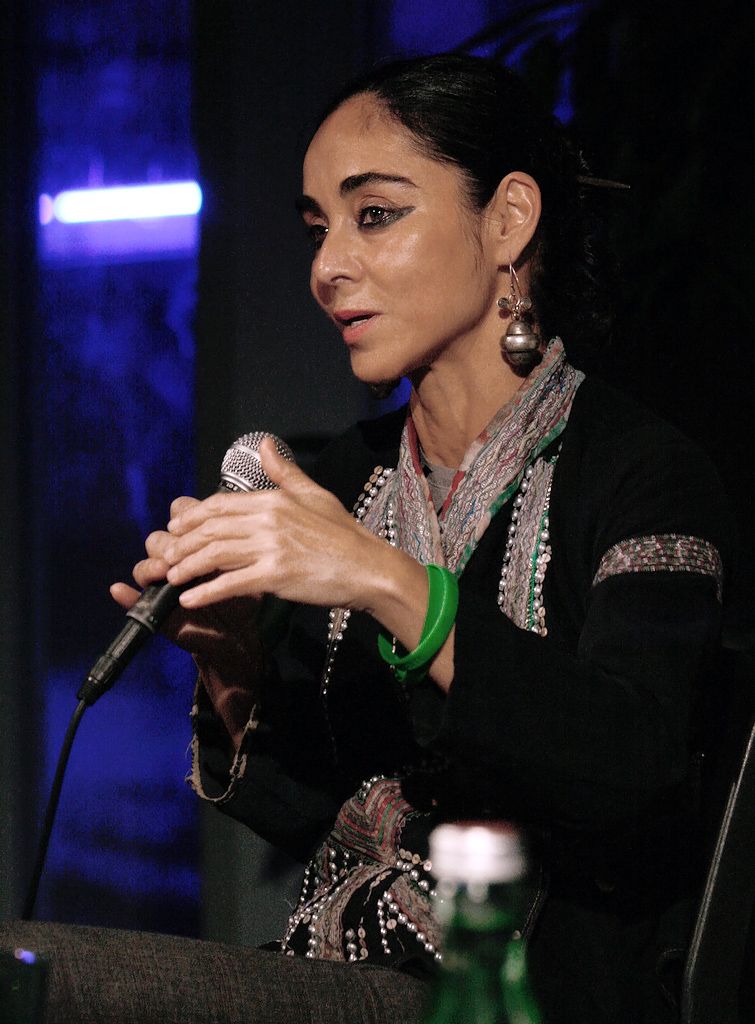
- Neshat at the Viennale 2009
- Born: March 26, 1957 (age 69); Qazvin, Imperial State of Iran
- Education: University of California, Berkeley (BA, MA, MFA)
- Known for: Mixed media performance, video installations, photography
- Notable work: The Shadow under the Web (1997), Speechless (1996), Women without Men (2004) Rapture (1999)
- Movement: Contemporary art
- Spouse: Kyong Park (divorced)
- Partner: Shoja Azari
- Awards: Silver Lion Venice Film Festival, Golden Lion Venice Biennale

Shirin Neshat (Persian: شیرین نشاط; born March 26, 1957) is an Iranian photographer and visual artist who lives in New York City, known primarily for her work in film, video and photography. Her artwork centers on the contrasts between Islam and the West, femininity and masculinity, public life and private life, antiquity and modernity, and bridging the spaces between these subjects.

Since the Islamic Revolution, she has said that she has "gravitated toward making art that is concerned with tyranny, dictatorship, oppression and political injustice. Although I don’t consider myself an activist, I believe my art – regardless of its nature – is an expression of protest, a cry for humanity.”

Neshat has been recognized for winning the International Award of the XLVIII Venice Biennale in 1999, and the Silver Lion as the best director at the 66th Venice Film Festival in 2009, to being named Artist of the Decade by HuffPost critic G. Roger Denson. Neshat was a visiting critic in the photography department at the Yale School of Art in 2020.

== Early life and education ==
Neshat is the fourth of five children of wealthy parents, brought up in the religious city of Qazvin in north-western Iran under a "very warm, supportive Muslim family environment", where she learned traditional religious values through her maternal grandparents. Neshat's father was a physician and her mother a homemaker. Neshat said that her father "fantasized about the west, romanticized the west, and slowly rejected all of his own values; both her parents did. What happened, I think, was that their identity slowly dissolved, they exchanged it for comfort. It served their class".

Neshat was enrolled in a Catholic boarding school in Tehran. According to Neshat, her father encouraged his daughters to "be an individual, to take risks, to learn, to see the world". He sent his daughters, as well as his sons to college to receive higher education.

In 1975, Neshat left Iran to study art at University of California, Berkeley and completed her BA, MA and MFA degrees. In college she studied art under Harold Paris and Sylvia Lark. Neshat graduated from UC Berkeley in 1983, and soon moved to New York City. She quickly realized that making art wasn't her profession then. After meeting her future husband, who ran the Storefront for Art and Architecture, an alternative space in Manhattan, she dedicated ten years to working with him there.

During this time, Neshat made a few attempts at creating art, which was subsequently destroyed. She was intimidated by the New York art scene and believed her art was not substantial. She states, "Those ten years I made practically no art, and the art I did make I was dissatisfied with and eventually destroyed."

In 1990, Neshat returned to Iran, one year after Ayatollah Khomeini's death. "It was probably one of the most shocking experiences that I have ever had. The difference between what I had remembered from the Iranian culture and what I was witnessing was enormous. The change was both frightening and exciting; I had never been in a country that was so ideologically based. Most noticeable, of course, was the change in people's physical appearance and public behavior."

Since the Storefront ran like a cultural laboratory, Neshat was exposed to creators — artists, architects, and philosophers; she asserts Storefront eventually helped reignite her interest in art. In 1993 Neshat began earnestly to make art again, starting with photography.

== Career ==
Neshat's earliest works were photographs, such as the Unveiling (1993) and Women of Allah (1993–97) series, which explore notions of femininity about Islamic fundamentalism and militancy in her home country. As a way of coping with the discrepancy between the culture that she was experiencing and that of the pre-revolution Iran in which she was raised, she began her first mature body of work, the Women of Allah series, portraits of women entirely overlaid by Persian calligraphy.

Her work refers to the social, cultural and religious codes of Muslim societies and the complexity of certain oppositions, such as man and woman. Neshat often emphasizes this theme by showing two or more coordinated films concurrently, creating stark visual contrasts through motifs such as light and dark, black and white, male and female. Neshat has also made more traditional narrative short films, such as Zarin.

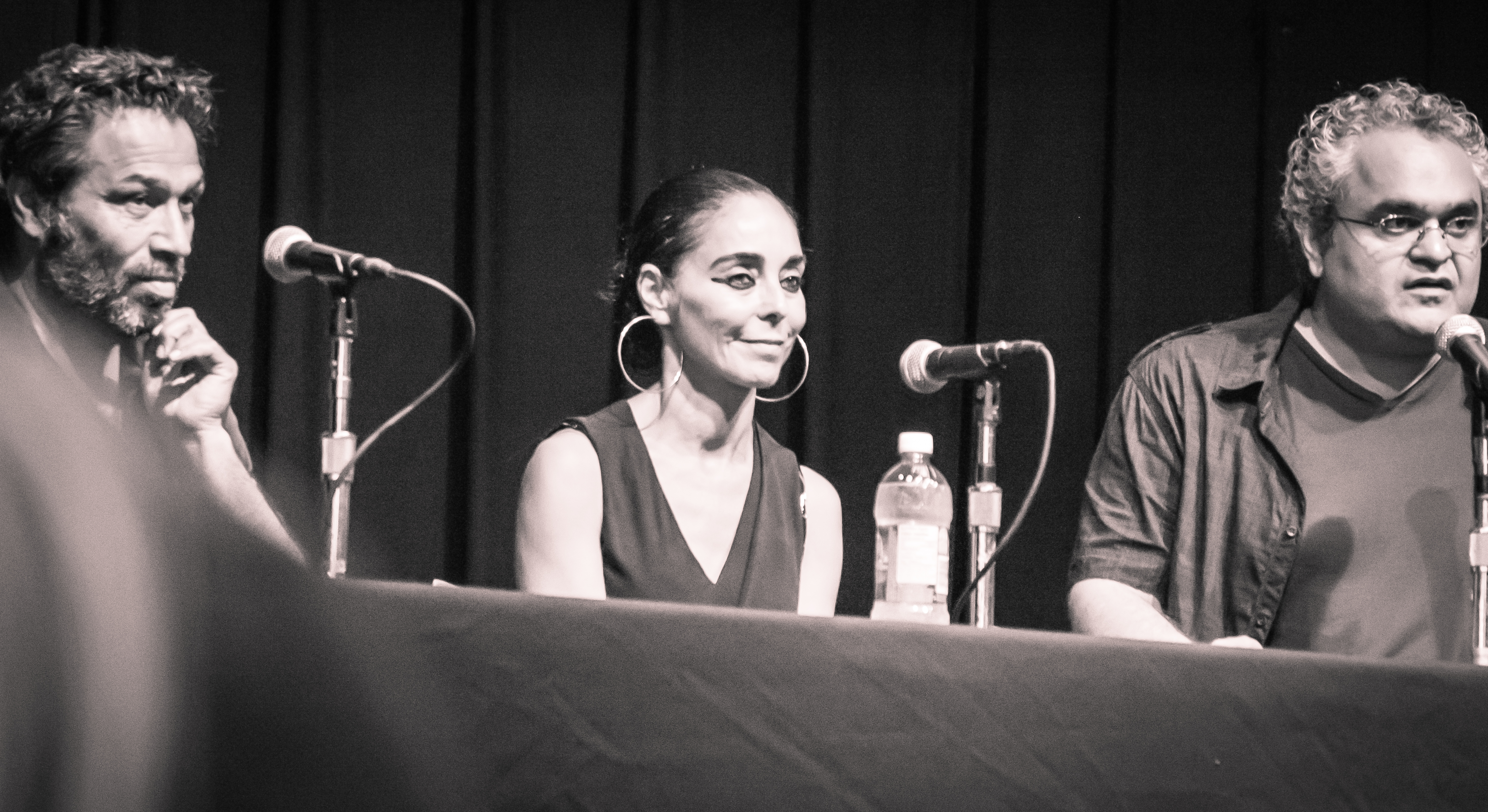
Shoja Azari, Shirin Neshat and Babak Payami at Tirgan Festival, 2013

The work of Neshat addresses the social, political and psychological dimensions of women's experience in contemporary Islamic societies. Although Neshat actively resists stereotypical representations of Islam, her artistic objectives are not explicitly polemical. Rather, her work recognizes the complex intellectual and religious forces shaping the identity of Muslim women throughout the world. Using Persian poetry and calligraphy, she examined concepts such as martyrdom, the space of exile, the issues of identity and femininity.

In 2001–02, Neshat collaborated with singer Sussan Deyhim and created Logic of the Birds, which was produced by curator and art historian RoseLee Goldberg. The full-length multimedia production premiered at the Lincoln Center Summer Festival in 2002 and toured to the Walker Art Institute in Minneapolis and Artangel in London. In this collaboration and her other projects that incorporate music, Neshat uses sound to help create an emotionally evocative and beautiful piece that will resonate with viewers of both Eastern and Western cultures. In an interview with Bomb magazine in 2000, Neshat revealed: "Music becomes the soul, the personal, the intuitive, and neutralizes the sociopolitical aspects of the work. This combination of image and music is meant to create an experience that moves the audience." In 2011, Neshat created her second live performance, OverRuled, for Performa 11.

When Neshat first came to use film, she was influenced by the work of Iranian director Abbas Kiarostami. She directed several videos, among them Anchorage (1996) and, projected on two opposing walls: Shadow under the Web (1997), Turbulent (1998), Rapture (1999) and Soliloquy (1999). Neshat's recognition became more international in 1999, when she won the International Award of the XLVIII Venice Biennale with Turbulent and Rapture, a project involving almost 250 extras and produced by the Galerie Jérôme de Noirmont which met with critical and public success after its worldwide avant-première at the Art Institute of Chicago in May 1999. With Rapture, Neshat tried for the first time to make pure photography with the intent of creating an aesthetic, poetic, and emotional shock. Games of Desire, a video and still-photography piece, was displayed between September 3 and October 3 at the Gladstone Gallery in Brussels before moving in November to the Galerie Jérôme de Noirmont in Paris. The film, which is based in Laos, centers on a small group of elderly people who sing folk songs with sexual lyrics - a practice which had been nearing obsolescence.

In 2009, she won the Silver Lion for best director at the 66th Venice Film Festival for her directorial debut Women Without Men, based on Shahrnush Parsipur's novel of the same name. She said about the movie: "This has been a labour of love for six years. ... This film speaks to the world and to my country." The film examines the 1953 British-American backed coup, which supplanted Iran's democratically elected government with a monarchy.

In July 2009, Neshat took part in a three-day hunger strike at the United Nations Headquarters in New York in protest of the 2009 Iranian presidential election.

In 2010, Neshat appeared in an episode of the German documentary television series Durch die Nacht mit ... with musician Henry Rollins.

In 2022, she joined protests about the Death of Mahsa Amini, by showing her work Woman Life Freedom, at Piccadilly Circus, and Pendry West Hollywood.

In 2026, Neshat signed with 800 other Hollywood professionals, the statement calling to condemn Iran for the atrocities it committed against Iranian civilians during the 2025-2026 Iranian protests against reparation and economic crisis.

== Exhibitions ==
Neshat's first solo exhibition was at Franklin Furnace in New York in 1993. A major retrospective of Neshat's work, organized by the Detroit Institute of Arts, opened 2013. In 2014, she had an exhibition titled "Afterwards", at the Mathaf: Arab Museum of Modern Art. In 2019, The Broad Museum in Los Angeles presented a 30-year retrospective of Neshat's work: Shirin Neshat: I Will Greet the Sun Again; the show traveled to the Modern Art Museum of Fort Worth in 2021. In 2022, Neshat participated in the group exhibition "Eyes on Iran" at Franklin D. Roosevelt Four Freedoms State Park, Roosevelt Island, New York; in response to the Mahsa Amini protests. Shirin Neshat: I Will Greet the Sun Again at The Broad in Los Angeles, 2019–2020, was her largest exhibition to date. In 2023, Neshat presented The Fury at Fotografiska Stockholm, followed by a presentation of the exhibition at Fotografiska Berlin in 2024.

== Recognition ==
Neshat was an artist in residence at the Wexner Center for the Arts in 2000 and at MASS MoCA in 2001. In 2004, she was awarded an honorary professorship at the Universität der Künste, Berlin. In 2006, she was awarded The Dorothy and Lillian Gish Prize, one of the richest prizes in the arts, given annually to "a man or woman who has made an outstanding contribution to the beauty of the world and mankind's enjoyment and understanding of life."

In 2010, Neshat was named Artist of the Decade by Huffington Post critic G. Roger Denson, for "the degree to which world events have more than met the artist in making her art chronically relevant to an increasingly global culture," for reflecting "the ideological war being waged between Islam and the secular world over matters of gender, religion, and democracy," and because "the impact of her work far transcends the realms of art in reflecting the most vital and far-reaching struggle to assert human rights."

In 2015, Neshat was selected and photographed by Annie Leibovitz as part of the 43rd Pirelli Calendar.

== Opera ==
At the 2017 Salzburg Festival, Neshat directed Giuseppe Verdi's opera Aida, with Riccardo Muti as conductor and Anna Netrebko singing the main character. Asked by the festival organizers about the particular challenge for an Iranian woman to stage a play that deals with the threats of political obedience and religion to private life and love, Neshat said, "Sometimes the boundaries between Aida and myself are blurred."

== Works ==
- Turbulent, 1998. Two channel video/audio installation.
- Rapture, 1999. Two channel video/audio installation.
- Soliloquy, 1999. Color video/audio installation with artist as the protagonist.
- Fervor, 2000. Two channel video/audio installation.
- Passage, 2001. Single channel video/audio installation.
- Logic of the Birds, 2002. Multi-media performance.
- Tooba, 2002. Two channel video/audio installation based on Shahrnush Parsipur's novel Women Without Men.
- The Last Word, 2003. Single channel video/audio installation.
- Mahdokht, 2004. Three channel video/audio installation.
- Zarin, 2005. Single channel video/audio installation.
- Munis, 2008. Color video/audio installation based on Shahrnush Parsipur's novel Women Without Men.
- Faezeh, 2008. Color video/audio installation based on Shahrnush Parsipur's novel Women Without Men.
- Possessed, 2009. Black & white video/audio installation.
- Women Without Men, 2009. Feature film based on Shahrnush Parsipur's novel Women Without Men.
- OverRuled, 2011. Performance.
- Before My Eyes, 2011. Two channel short film. Part of the Seasons series.
- Illusions & Mirrors, 2013. Short film commissioned by Dior and featuring Natalie Portman.
- Looking for Oum Kulthum, 2017.Feature film co-directed by Shoja Azari.
- Land of Dreams, 2021. Feature film co-directed with Shoja Azari, written by Jean-Claude Carrière.
- The Fury, 2022. Monochrome two channel video installation.

== Awards ==
- First International Prize at the Venice Biennale (1999)
- Grand Prix at the Kwangju Biennale (2000)
- Visual Art Award from the Edinburgh International Film Festival (2000)
- Infinity Award from the International Center of Photography, New York (2002)
- ZeroOne Award from the Universität der Künste Berlin (2003)
- Hiroshima Freedom Prize from the Hiroshima Museum of Art (2005)
- The Dorothy and Lillian Gish Prize, New York (2006)
- Rockefeller Foundation Media Arts Fellowship, New York (2008)
- Cultural Achievement Award, Asia Society, New York (2008)
- Silver Lion Award for Best Director, 66th Venice International Film Festival (2009)
- Cinema for Peace Special Award, Hessischer Filmpreis, Germany (2009)
- Crystal Award, World Economic Forum, Davos, Switzerland (2014)
- Rockefeller Fellow, United States Artists, New York (2016)
- Praemium Imperiale Award (2017)
- Honorary Fellowship of the Royal Photographic Society, Bristol (2020)

== Bibliography ==
=== Exhibition catalogues ===
- Women of Allah
- Two Installations
- Shirin Neshat: 2002-2005, Barbara Gladstone Gallery, New York
- I Know Something About Love, multimedia group exhibition with Christodoulos Panayiotou, Yinka Shonibare and Yang Fudong at Parasol Unit, London.

=== Other literature and film ===
- Expressing the Inexpressible: Shirin Neshat. Documentary by Jörg Neumeister-Jung and Ralf Raimo Jung, originally produced by Westdeutscher Rundfunk in 2000. Video, 42 minutes, color. DVD: Films for the Humanities & Sciences, Princeton, NJ, 2004. Online: Films Media Group, New York, N.Y., 2005.
- Hirahara, Naomi. We Are Here, Hachette, 2022

== See also ==
- Iranian cinema
- Iranian modern and contemporary art
- List of Iranian women in the fine arts

== Works cited ==
- Grosenick, Uta; Riemschneider, Burkhard, eds. (2005). Art Now (25th anniversary ed.). Köln: Taschen. pp. 212–215. ISBN 9783822840931. OCLC 191239335.
- Mohammed Afkhami, Sussan Babaie, Venetia Porter, Natasha Morris. "Honar: The Afkhami Collection of Modern and Contemporary Iranian Art." Phaidon Press, 2017. ISBN 9780714873527.
