= Hany Adel =

Egyptian musician and screen actor

- هاني عادل
- Born: September 8, 1976 (age 49); Egypt
- Occupations: Singer, guitarist
- Spouse: Diamand Bou Abboud

Hany Adel (Arabic: هاني عادل; born September 8, 1976) is an Egyptian guitarist, vocalist, and screen actor.

== Life and career ==
He is the founding member of the Arabic language band Wust El-Balad. He has also played supporting roles in a number of contemporary Egyptian films dealing with controversial social and political issues facing Arab society. These films include Microphone (2010), a film about Egypt's culture wars, Asmaa (2011) about a woman living in Cairo with HIV/AIDS, the 2013 film Fatat El Masnaa (Factory Girl) about gender and class discrimination in modern Egyptian society and the movie Ishtibak (Clash), set after the political events of June 2013.

Adel is married to Lebanese actress Diamand Abou Abboud.
