= Kenneth Harding (sportsman) =

English cricketer

Personal information
- Full name: Kenneth Harding
- Born: 12 February 1892; Greenwich, London, England
- Died: 30 November 1977 (aged 85); Eastbourne, Sussex, England
- Batting: Right-handed

Domestic team information
- Years: Team
- 1928: Sussex

Career statistics
Competition	First-class
Matches	3
Runs scored	91
Batting average	18.20
100s/50s	–/1
Top score	55*
Balls bowled	–
Wickets	–
Bowling average	–
5 wickets in innings	–
10 wickets in match	–
Best bowling	–
Catches/stumpings	–/–
- Source: Cricinfo, 22 June 2012

Kenneth Harding (12 February 1892 – 30 November 1977) was an English cricketer. Harding was a right-handed batsman. He was born at Greenwich, London, and was educated at St Edward's School, Oxford.

Harding fought in World War I, during which part of his right hand was blown off. However this did not greatly restrict his ability to play cricket, with him later making three first-class appearances for Sussex in 1928 County Championship, against Yorkshire, Hampshire and Essex. He scored 91 runs in his three matches, at an average of 18.20, with a high score of 55 not out, which he made against Essex.

Outside of cricket he played rugby union for Blackheath F.C., and was at one point considered for England selection. He died at Eastbourne, Sussex, on 30 November 1977.
