= Lorenzo Belenguer =

Spanish artist from Valencia

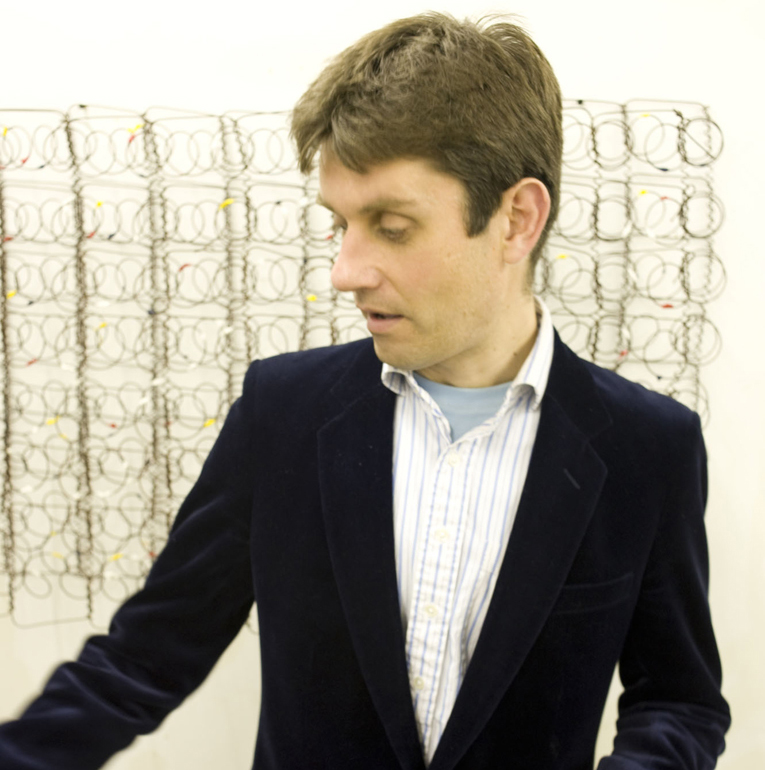
- Belenguer with his work "Homage to Pollock" at the back
- Born: 1970 (age 55–56); Valencia, Spain
- Education: University of the Arts London; University of Valencia, Spain
- Known for: Minimalism, Arte Povera, Conceptual art,
- Movement: Neo-minimalism

Lorenzo Belenguer (born 1970) is a Spanish non-binary artist from Valencia who is active in London. Belenguer, who is resident in both Valencia and London, managed an art gallery for 6 years before deciding to become a full-time artist himself.

His works are influenced by Arte Povera and Minimalism. He created "Testimonies," a project for the 2012 Summer Olympics in London. He was the sole Spanish artist invited to the Red Gallery exhibit "Factual Nonsense" as a homage to Joshua Compston who was closely associated with the emergence of the Young British Artists (YBAs). His other exhibitions and performances occurred at the Serpentine Gallery, Tate Liverpool, and Tate Modern.

In July 2014, Belenguer participated in the art exhibition "Marvellous Mix-ups X1 Big Deal" in London

In October 2014, Belenguer was invited to exhibit in "We Could not Agree" that took place in a car park in central London during the Frieze Art Fair Week with a presence of 80 artists.

In early 2016, Belenguer set up a studio in Villar del Arzobispo, Valencia, called "Estudio Mediterraneum" with the intention of organising an exchange of artists residencies between London and Valencia.

In May 2016, Belenguer curated and exhibited in the show "NY/Rome Minimalism/Arte Povera" about Contemporary Minimalism that included Gavin Turk.

As of May 2016 he resides in London and Valencia.

In May 2017, Belenguer set up a gallery project in Notting Hill, London, in an undisclosed address. The Incognito Art Gallery, as it is named, imposed a £20 donation to gain entrance to cover the costs of hospitality and the private tour. The donation was fully deductible upon a purchase of an artwork. However, it proved to be controversial to some people.

In January 2023, Belenguer started the Queer Tarot. Belenguer’s reinterpretation of the Tarot cards moves away from the rigid binary system and continues non-binary and gender-fluid. Gender-neutral nouns such as Foolishness or wizardry are used to facilitate the liberation from gender roles and conformity. A variety of symbols from different traditions in this journey of self-discovery and self-love.
