= Antonio Gragnani =

Antonio Gragnani (1740–1794) was an Italian violin maker. Some sources claim he studied in Florence, Italy, although his craftsmanship style differed from that of other 18th century Florentine makers. He worked in the city of Livorno, his home town in the region of Tuscany, between the years of 1765 until his death, a seaside location that offered him materials needed in violin-making process. Most of his violins follow a Stradivari pattern. He was known for being exceptionally neat in his work, and he was succeeded by his son, Onorato Gragnani, who was less skilled than his father.
