= Music of Egypt =

External videos
- Turkish-Egyptian Dance Troupe Al Rakasaat's "Alexandria" Choreographed by Karen Custer Thurston

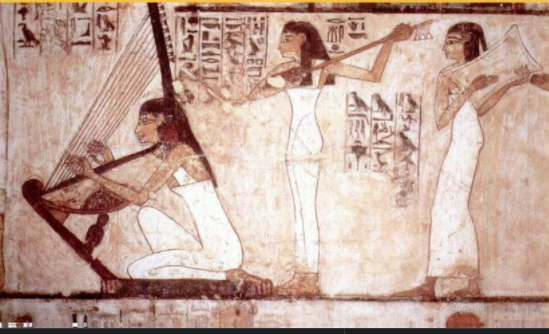
An ancient Egyptian mural of people playing music.

Music has been integral to Egyptian culture since antiquity. Egyptian music had a substantial influence on the development of ancient Greek music and, via the Greeks, was important to early European music well into the Middle Ages.

Due to the millennia of Egypt's dominance over its neighbors, Egyptian culture, including music and musical instruments, was very influential in the surrounding regions; for instance, the instruments described in the Bible as having been played by the ancient Hebrews were all Egyptian instruments, as established by Egyptian archaeology.

Modern Egyptian music is a prime core of Middle Eastern music, owing to the huge popularity of the Egyptian cinema and music industries, owing to Egypt's political influence on neighboring countries, and owing to Egypt producing the region's most accomplished musicians and composers, especially in the 20th century.

The tonal structure of the East's music is defined by the maqamat, loosely similar to the Western modes, while rhythm in the East is governed by the iqa'at, standard rhythmic modes formed by combinations of accented and unaccented beats and rests.

== History ==
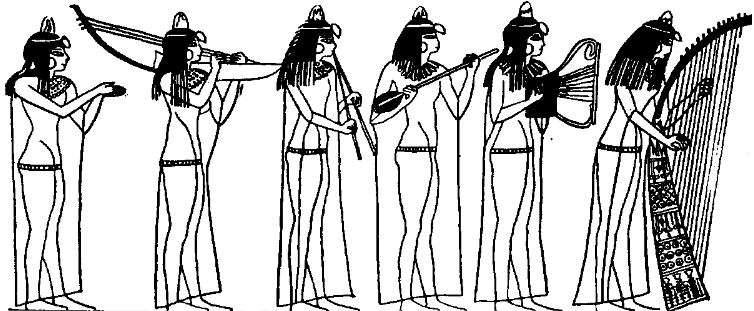
Egyptian instrumentals

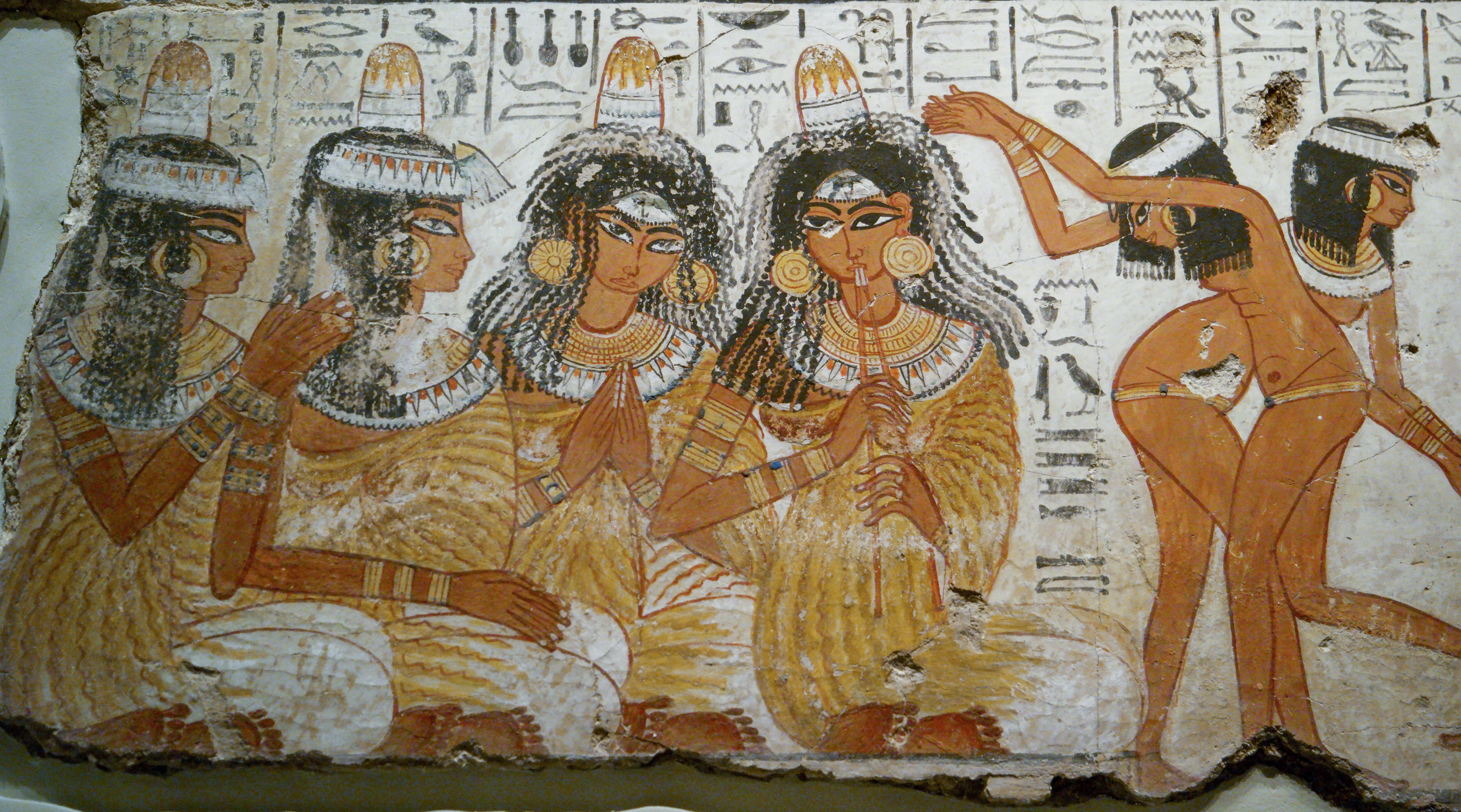
Lute and double pipe players, and female dancers from a mural found in the Theban tomb of Nebamun, a nobleman of the 18th Dynasty of the New Kingdom, c. 1350 BC

The ancient Egyptians credited the goddess Bat and the god Ihy with the invention of music. The cult of Bat was eventually syncretised into that of Hathor because both were depicted as cows. Hathor's music was believed to have been used by Osiris as part of his effort to civilise the world. The lion-goddess Bastet was also considered a goddess of music in ancient Egypt.

=== Neolithic period ===
In prehistoric Egypt, chanting was commonly used in magic and rituals. Rhythms during this time were unvaried and music served to create rhythm. Small shells were used as whistles.

=== Predynastic period ===
During the predynastic period of Egyptian history, funerary chants continued to play an important role in Egyptian religion and were accompanied by clappers or a flute. Despite the lack of physical evidence in some cases, Egyptologists theorise that the development of certain instruments known of the Old Kingdom period, such as the end-blown flute, took place during this time.

=== Old Kingdom ===
The evidence for instruments played is more securely attested in the Old Kingdom when arched harps, flutes and double clarinets were played. Percussion instruments and lutes were added to orchestras by the Middle Kingdom. Cymbals frequently accompanied music and dance, much as they still do in Egypt today.

=== Medieval music ===
Early Middle Eastern music was influenced by Byzantine and Roman forms, which were themselves heavily influenced by earlier Greek, Semitic, and Ancient Egyptian music.

Egyptians in Medieval Cairo believed that music exercised "too powerful an effect upon the passions, and leading men into gaiety, dissipation and vice." However, Egyptians generally were very fond of music. Though, according to E.W. Lane, no "man of sense" would ever become a musician, music was a key part of society. Tradesmen of every occupation used music during work and schools taught the Quran by chanting.

The music of Medieval Egypt was derived from Ancient Egyptian and Byzantine traditions. Lane said that "the most remarkable peculiarity of the Arabic system of music is the division of tones into thirds," although today Western musicologists prefer to say that Arabic music's tones are divided into quarters. The songs of this period were similar in sound and simple, within a small range of tones. Egyptian song, though simple in form, is embellished by the singer. Distinct enunciation and a quavering voice are also characteristics of Egyptian singing.

Male professional musicians during this period were called alateeyeh (plural), or alatee (singular), which means "a player upon an instrument". However, this name applies to both vocalists as well as instrumentalists. This position was considered disreputable and lowly. However, musicians found work singing or playing at parties to entertain the company. They generally made three shillings a night, but earned more by the guests' givings.

Female professional musicians were called awalim (pl) or almah, literally an educated woman. These singers were often hired on the occasion of a celebration in the harem of a wealthy person. They were not with the harem, but in an elevated room that was concealed by a screen so as not to be seen by either the harem or the master of the house. The awalim were more highly paid than male performers and more highly regarded than the alateeyeh as well. Lane relates an instance of a female performer who so enraptured her audience that she earned up to fifty guineas for one night's performance from the guests and host, themselves not considered wealthy.

=== Modern Egyptian classical and pop music ===
In the second half of the 19th century, the Egyptian folk street music band Hasaballah, a genre of popular improvisational brass band folk music emerged, initiated by clarinettist Mohamed Hasaballah and his band based on the traditional music of the Egyptians, and is shortly called Hasaballah, a band playing in Cairo's music and entertainment quarter on Mohammed Ali Street. The typical line-up of trumpet, trombone, bass and snare drums, was popular, such as at family events, for well over a century, and is still played.

Egyptian music began to be recorded as early as in the 1910s. The Egyptians have always expressed themselves and daily lives and even struggles with their music and traditional folk music. By the 1930s, Egypt's classical musical tradition was already thriving, centered on the city of Cairo. In general, modern Egyptian music blends its rich indigenous traditions, with some western elements that helped create Egyptian pop music.

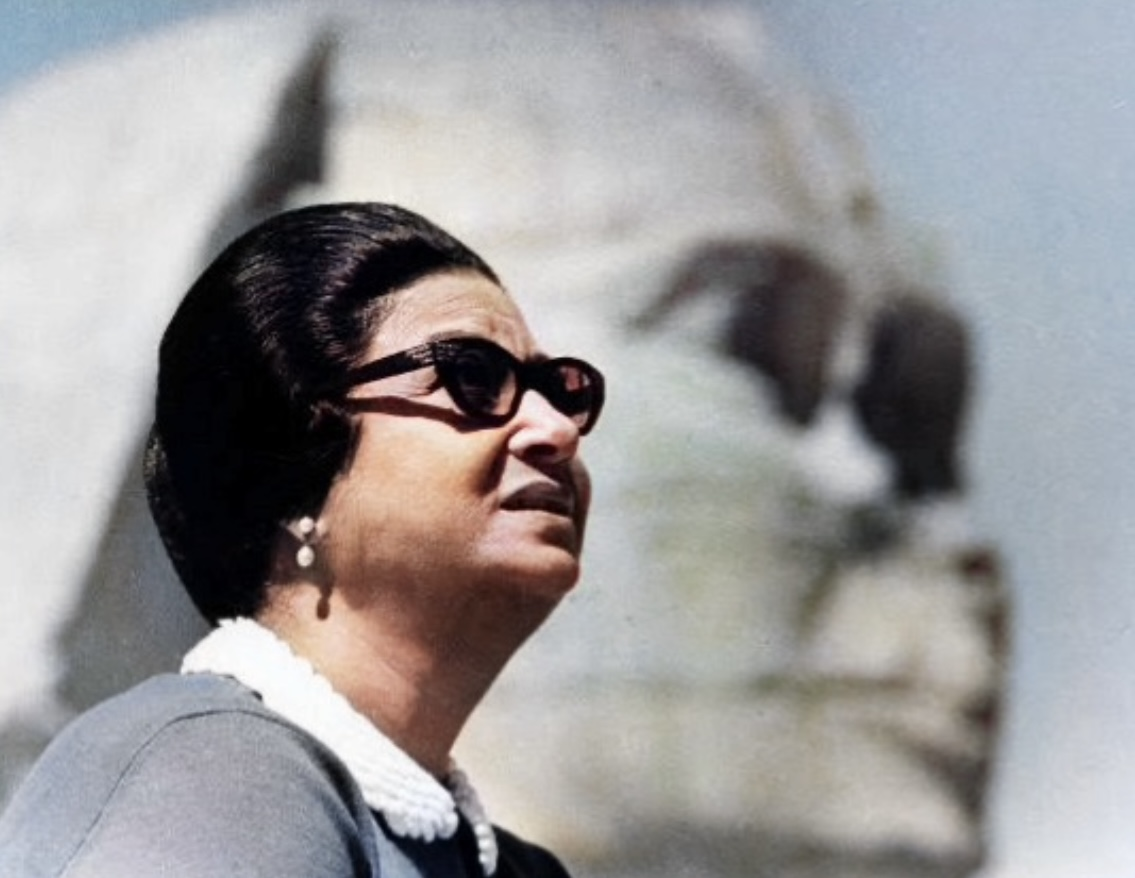
Umm Kulthum

Since the end of World War I, some of the Middle East's biggest musical stars have been Egyptian. Contemporary classical Egyptian music traces its beginnings to the creative work of traditional classical Egyptian musicians Abdu El Hamouly, Almaz, and Mahmud Osman, as well as the later work of the 20th century's most important Egyptian composers and singers, like Sayed Darwish, Umm Kulthum, Mohammed Abdel Wahab, Abdel Halim Hafez, and Baligh Hamdy. Most of these stars, including Umm Kulthum, Abdel Halim, Mohamed Fawzi and many others were part of the traditional Egyptian music. Some, like Abd el-Halim Hafez, were associated with the Egyptian nationalist movement from 1952 onward.

In the 21st century, Cairo-born Fatma Said was the first Egyptian soprano to sing at the Teatro alla Scala in Milan. From 2016 to 2018, she took part in the BBC Radio 3 New Generation Artists scheme.

==== Shaabi and Mahraganat ====
Shaabi ("Of the people") is the most popular musical genre in Egypt.

It is a form of popular working-class music which evolved from Egyptian Baladi ("Of the country") in the second half of the 20th century, it's the most common type of music and is usually heard in every day streets, weddings, festivals and transport.

A recent offshoot from Shaabi; Mahraganat ("(Of) Festivals") is a more spunky and loud subgenre that uses more electronic and hip-hop elements, with heavy auto-tune. It has its roots in the mid-2000s but was massively popularized in 2011, amidst the Egyptian revolution.

Due to its impoverished young male appeal and history, it tends to be more outspokenly political than Shaabi.

== Western classical music ==
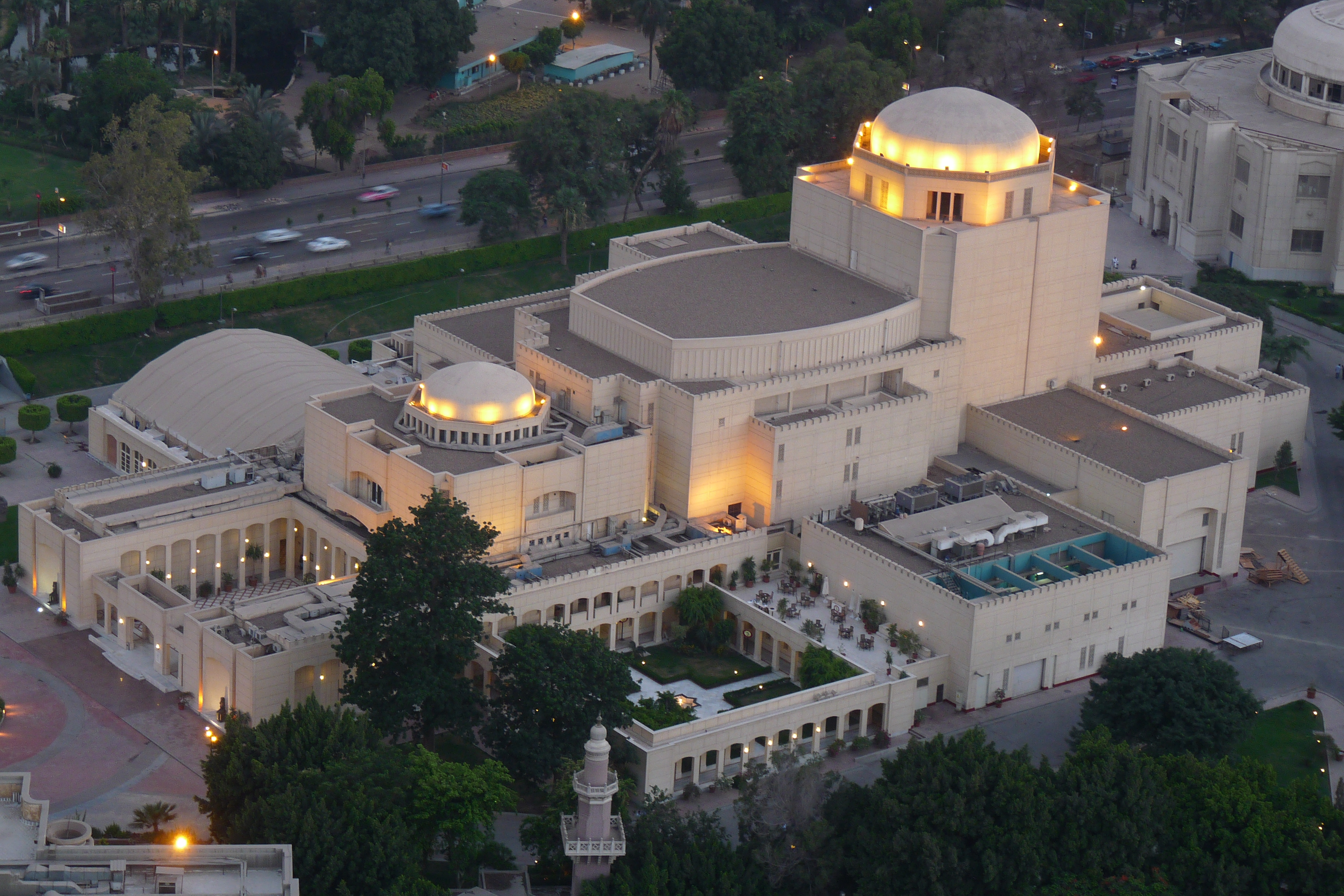
Cairo Opera House, a landmark in the cultural landscape of Egypt and the Middle East

Western classical music was introduced to Egypt in the middle of the 18th century, instruments such as the piano and violin were gradually adopted by Egyptians. Opera also became increasingly popular during the 18th century, and Giuseppe Verdi's Egyptian-themed Aida was premiered in Cairo on December 24, 1871.

By the early 20th century, the first generation of Egyptian composers, including Yusef Greiss, Abu Bakr Khairat, and Hasan Rashid, began writing for Western instruments. The second generation of Egyptian composers included notable artists such as Gamal Abdelrahim. Representative composers of the third generation are Ahmed El-Saedi and Rageh Daoud. In the early 21st century, even fourth generation composers such as Mohamed Abdelwahab Abdelfattah (of the Cairo Conservatory) have gained international attention.

== Religious music in Egypt ==
Religious music remains an essential part of traditional Sufi Muslim and Coptic Christian celebrations called mulids. Mulids are held in Egypt to celebrate the saint of a particular church or an exalted local Muslim figure. Muslim mulids are related to the Sufi zikr ritual. The Egyptian flute, called the ney, is commonly played at mulids. The liturgical music of the Alexandrian Rite also constitutes an important element of Egyptian music and is said to have preserved many features of ancient Egyptian music.

== Folk music ==
Egyptian folk music, including the traditional Sufi dhikr rituals in Egypt, are the closest contemporary music genre to ancient Egyptian music, having preserved many of its features, rhythms, and instruments.

== Folk and roots revival ==
The 20th century has seen Cairo become associated with a roots revival. Musicians from across Egypt are keeping folk traditions alive, such as those of rural Egyptians (fellahin), the Saii'da, and to a lesser extent minorities like the Siwa people, the Egyptian Romani, the Sinawis and the Nubians. Mixtures of folk and pop have also risen from the Cairo hit factory.

Since the Nasser era, Egyptian pop music has become increasingly important in Egyptian culture, particularly among the large youth population of Egypt. Egyptian folk music continues to be played during weddings and other traditional festivities. In the last quarter of the 20th century, Egyptian music was a way to communicate social and class issues. Among some of the most popular Egyptian pop singers today are Sherine Abdel-Wahab, Mohamed Mounir, and Amr Diab, Angham.

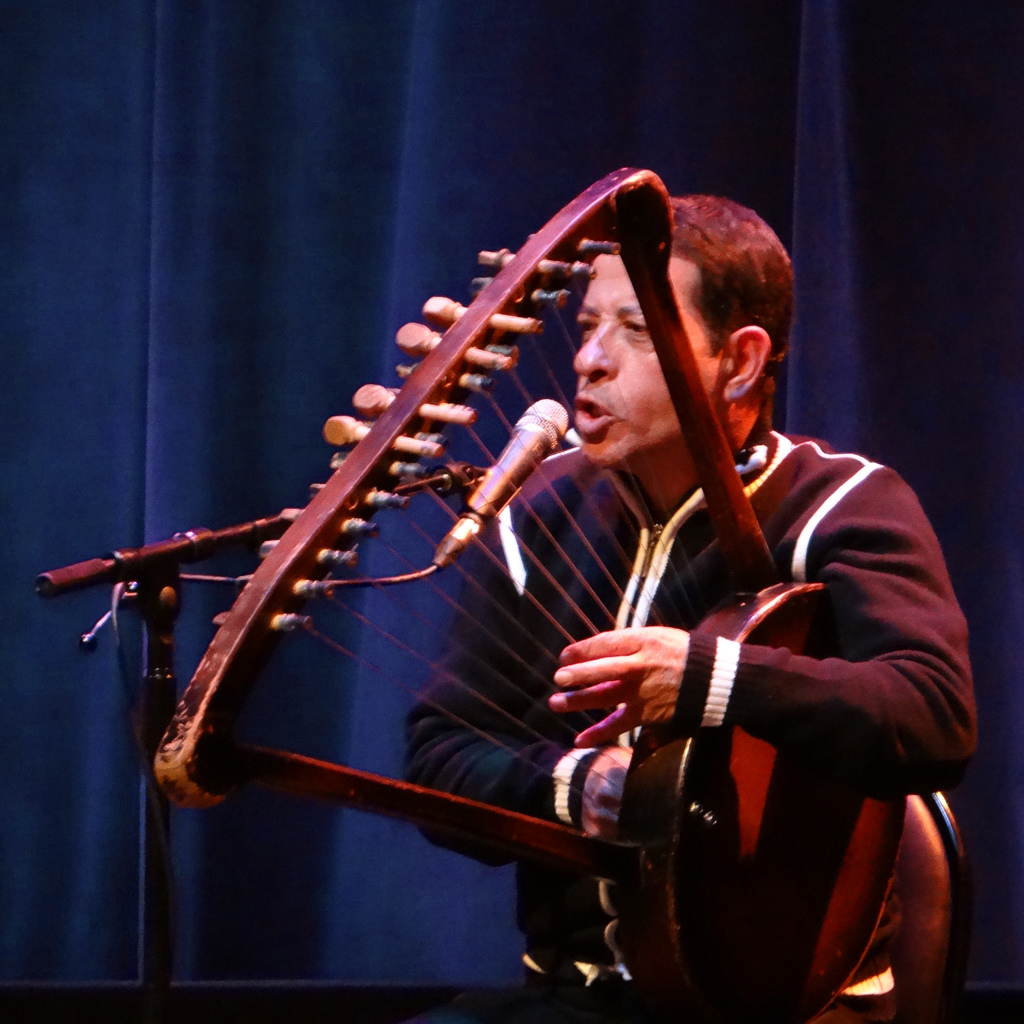
An Egyptian band playing the simsimiyya

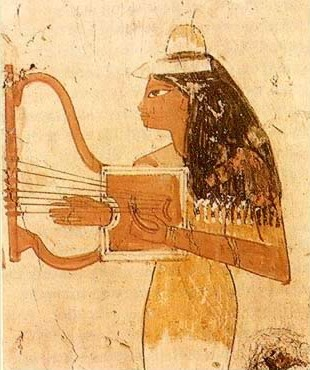
Ancient Egyptian lyre

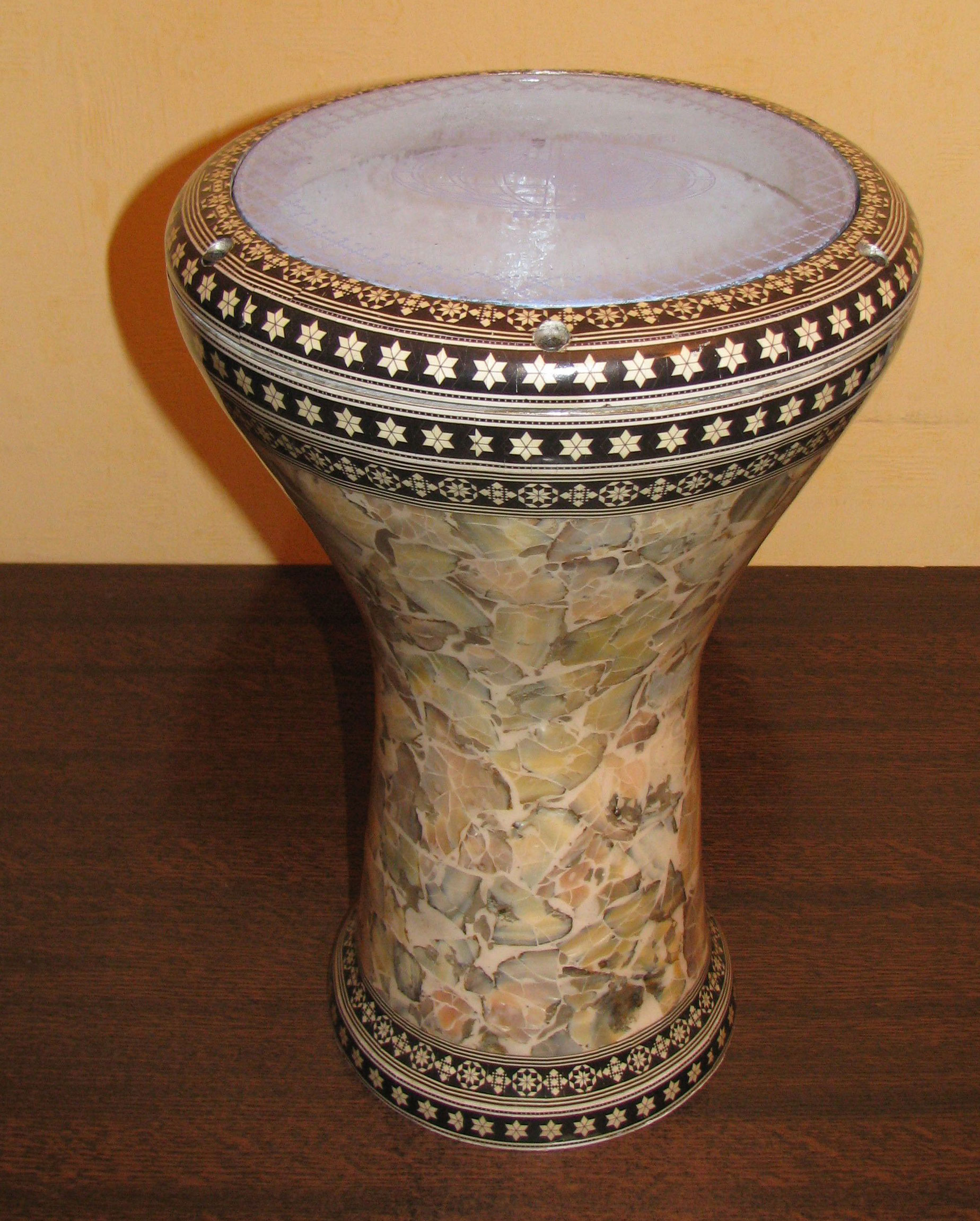
The Egyptian darbuka/tabla

Sawahli (coastal) music is a type of popular Egyptian music from the country's northern coast, and is based around ancient Egyptian instrumentals, mainly the simsimiyya, which is an indigenous Egyptian stringed instrument that has its roots in ancient Egypt, it---the simsimiyya---was probably introduced to the country's northern coast from the Nile valley in the 19th century by Egyptian workers in the Suez Canal. Well known Egyptian bands that feature the simsimiyya as a main instrument include el-Tanboura, which uses other ancient Egyptian instruments.

=== Saidi (Upper Egyptian) ===
Egyptian musicians from Upper Egypt play a form of folk music called Ṣa‘īdi which originates from Upper Egypt. Metqal Qenawi's Les Musiciens du Nil (Musicians of the Nile; who became known to Alain Weber in 1975), are the most popular Sa'īdi group, and were chosen by the government to represent Egyptian folk music abroad. They spent over three decades touring Europe performing at various festivals and musical events and in 1983 after their performance in the World of Music and Dance Festival, they were signed to Peter Gabriel's label Real World-Carolina and went on to feature on his album Passion. Other performers include Shoukoukou, Ahmad Ismail, Omar Gharzawi, Sohar Magdy and Ahmed Megahid.

=== Nubian ===
In Egypt, Nubians are native to the southern part of Aswan, though many also live in Cairo, Alexandria and other cities. Nubian folk music can still be heard, but migration and intercultural contact with Egyptian and other musical genres have produced innovations. Ali Hassan Kuban's efforts had made him a regular on the world music scene, while Mohamed Mounir's social criticism and sophisticated pop have made him a star among Nubians, Egyptians, and other people worldwide. Ahmed Mounib, Mohamed Mounir's mentor, was by far the most notable Nubian singer to hit the Egyptian music scene, singing in both Egyptian Arabic as well as in his native Nobiin. Hamza El Din was another popular Nubian Egyptian artist, well known on the world music scene, who collaborated with the Kronos Quartet.

== Egyptian musical instruments ==
A typical early 20th century Egyptian ensemble comprising the Oud, qanun, violin, ney, and cello.

Many of the modern day instruments, both in the East and the West, trace their roots back to ancient Egypt, and many ancient Egyptian instruments are still used in Egypt today, such as the darbuka, the simsimiyya, the Egyptian ney, among other instruments.

During the Abbasid and Ottoman dynasty Egypt was one of the main musical hubs in the middle east and therefore after the fall of the Ottoman Empire in 1923 Egypt became the capital of music in the Arabic-speaking world where classical instruments such as the oud, qanun, and ney were widely used. The typical takht (ensemble) consisted of an Oud player, qanun player, ney player and violin player. The takht (literally meaning a sofa) was the most common form of ensembles in the early 20th century before the adoption of more orchestral instruments which were introduced by composers such as Mohamed El Qasabgi, Riad El Sunbati and Mohammed Abdel Wahab.

== Electronic music ==
One of the most respected early electronic music composers, Halim El-Dabh, is an Egyptian. Active at the same time, or perhaps earlier than, the French electronic pioneers from the Studio d'Essai, he is one of, if not the, earliest composer of purely electronic music. In 1944 he composed the earliest known work of tape music, or musique concrète, called The Expression of Zar, which he composed in Egypt, while still a student in Cairo, by capturing sounds from the streets of Egypt on a wire recorder.

The Egyptian electronic music scene has gained a mainstream foothold in the forms of techno, trance, and dance pop DJs such as Aly & Fila. In the 2010s, Mahraganat music, an Egyptian form of electronic music which often contains political lyrics, gained popularity both inside and outside Egypt.

== Reconstruction of ancient Egyptian music ==
In the 20th and early 21st centuries, interest in the music of the pharaonic/ancient Egyptian period began to grow, inspired by the research of such foreign-born musicologists as Hans Hickmann, who lived and worked in Egypt. By the early 21st century, Egyptian musicians and musicologists led by the Egyptian musicology professor Khairy el-Malt at Helwan University in Cairo had begun to reconstruct musical instruments of ancient Egypt, a project that is ongoing.

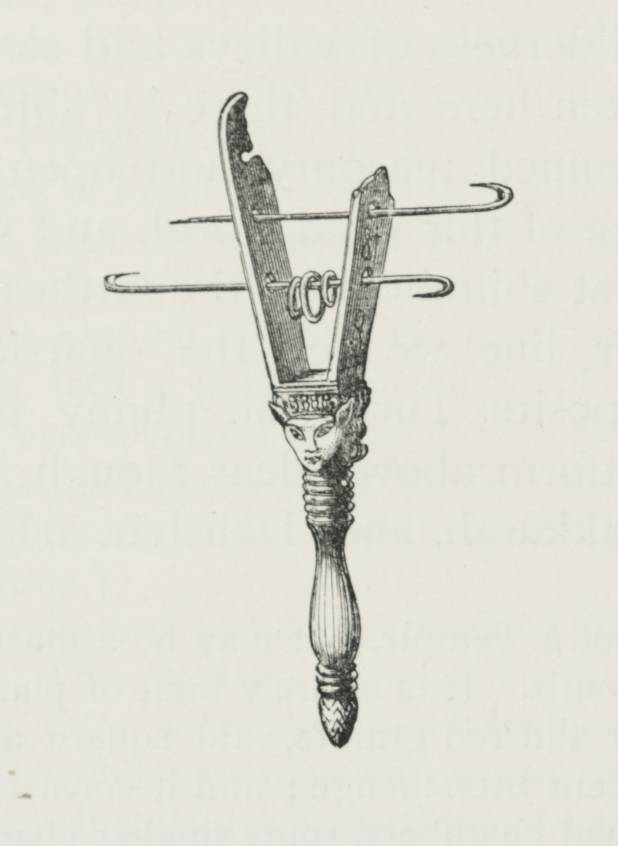
Broken Egyptian sistrum

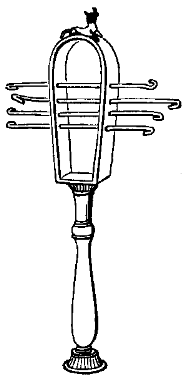
Egyptian sistrum

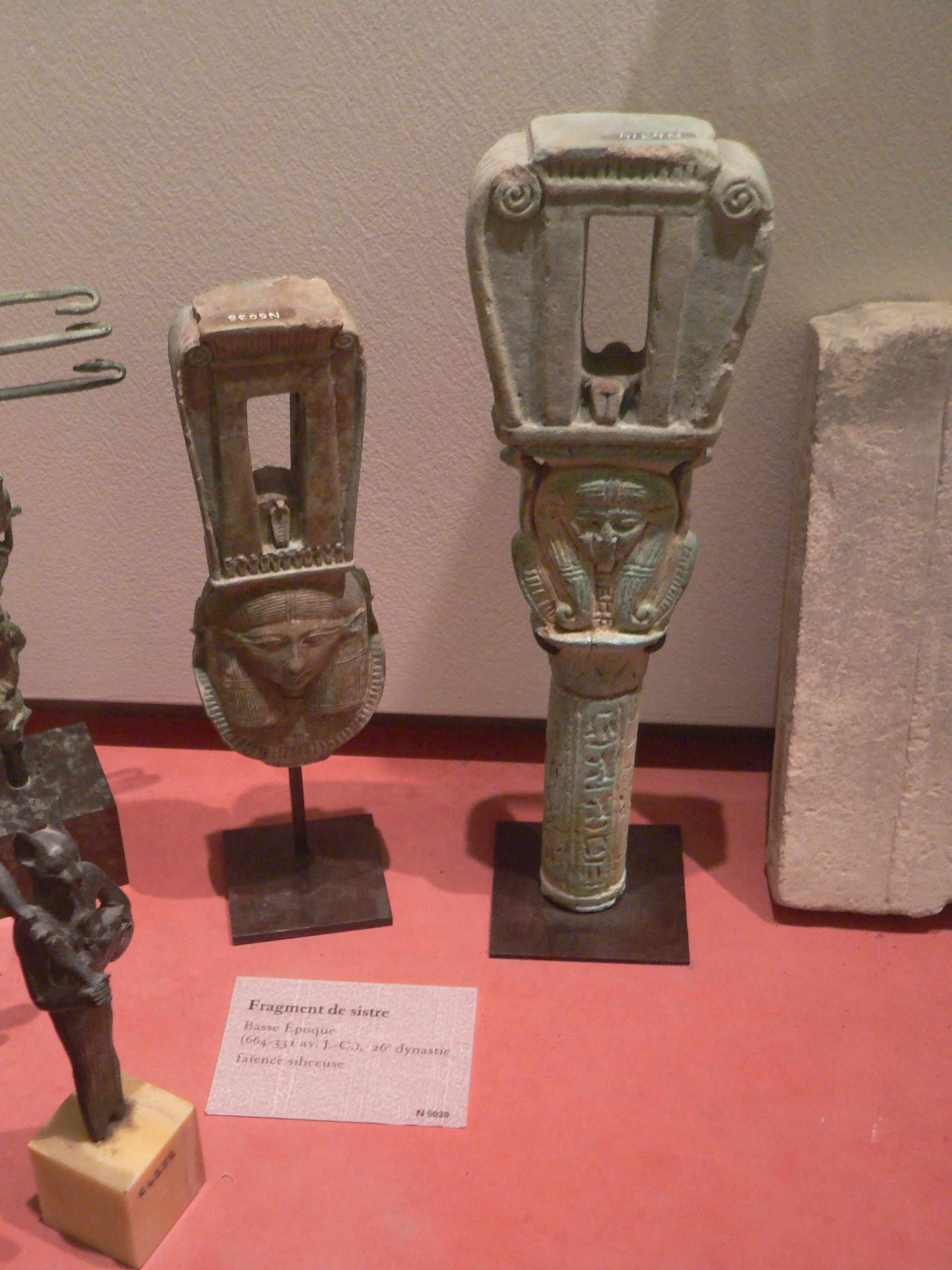
Collection of sistrums at the Louvre

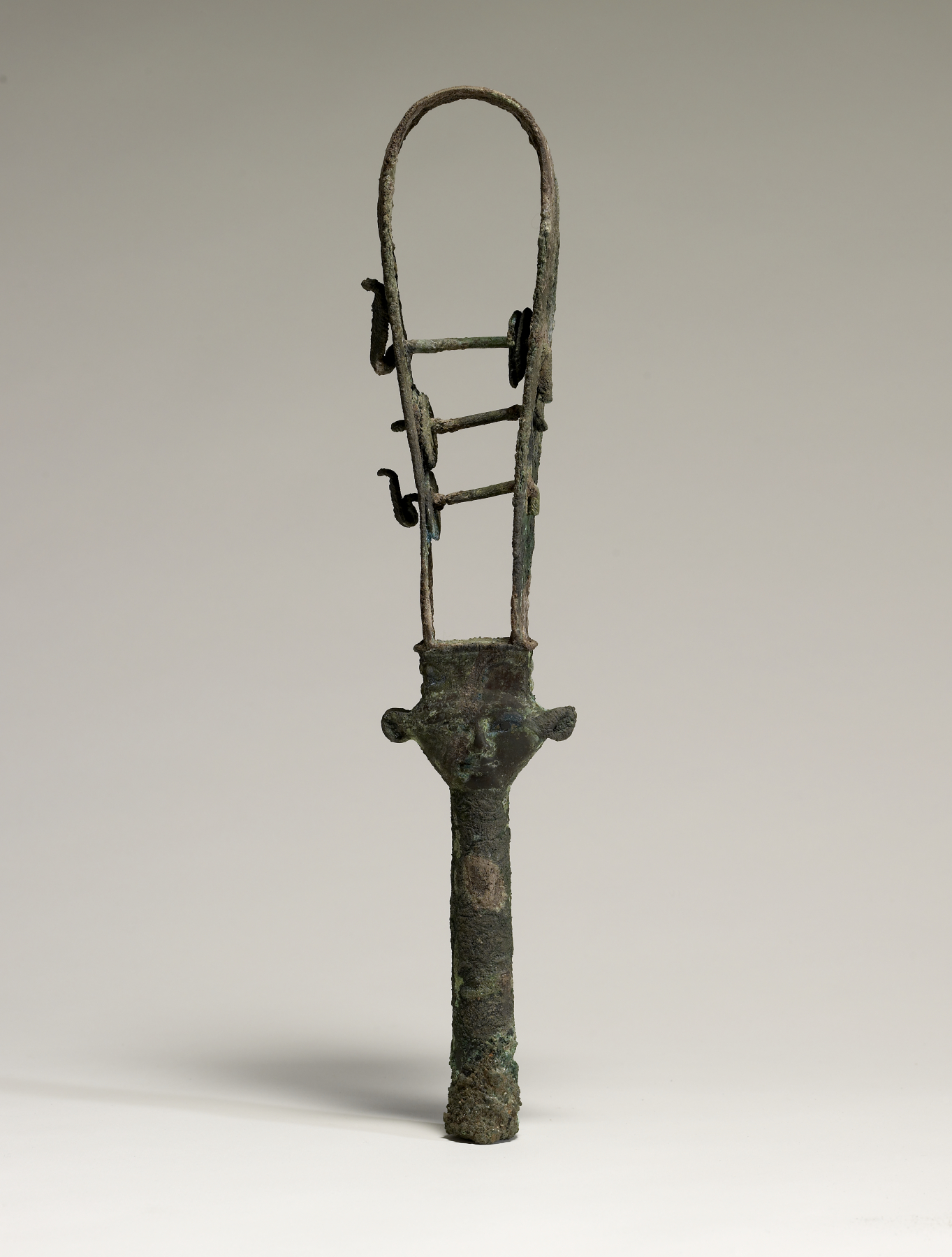
From the Walters Art Museum, 380–250 BC

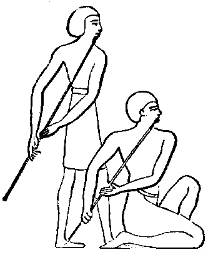
Ancient Egyptian long flute

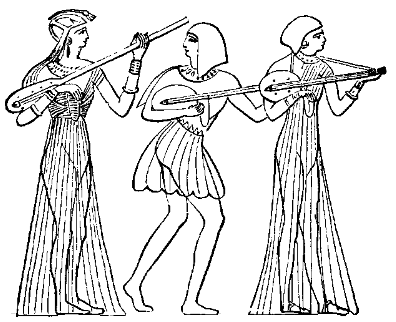
Ancient Egyptian stringed instruments

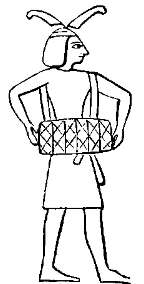
Ancient Egyptian with two-sided drum

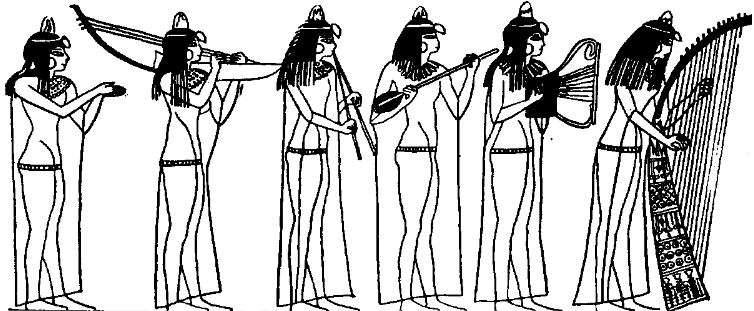
Ancient Egyptian music band

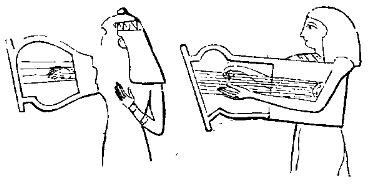
Late-style Egyptian lyre

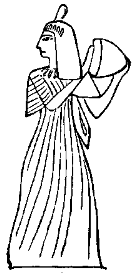
Ancient Egyptian woman playing drum

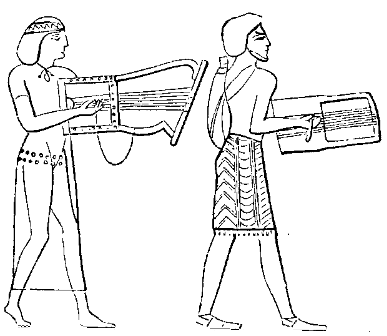
Egyptian lyre

== See also ==
- Egyptian contemporary art
- Music of Mesopotamia
- Music of Africa
- Arabic music
- Arabic pop music
