= Nabila Erian =

Egyptian professor and singer

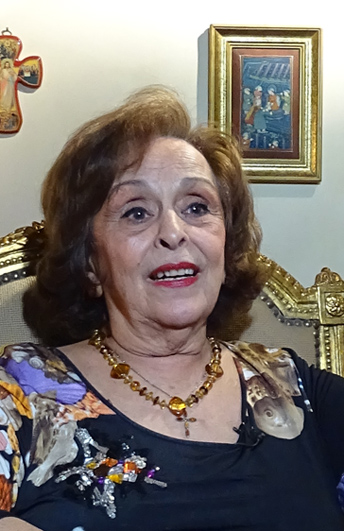
- Egyptian leading soprano Nabila Erian, 2017. Photo by Ola Seif
- Born: 1941 (age 84–85)
- Citizenship: Egypt
- Occupations: Singer, Actor

Nabila M. Erian (Arabic: نبيلة عريان, born 1941) is a professor of vocal sciences at the Cairo Conservatoire, Academy of Arts. Her career as a leading soprano opera singer debuted in 1960. She is also an expert on the history of Coptic music. Her latest research revolves around the continuity between the current practiced Coptic music and the Ancient Egyptian tradition. Erian advocates for the construction of a new modern state of the arts opera house at the New Cairo Administrative Capital.

== Education ==
Erian obtained her PhD entitled Coptic Music: An Egyptian Tradition in 1986 from the University of Maryland, Baltimore County. Between 1970 and 1973 she obtained several diplomas and a fellowship from the Trinity College London. In 1965, she obtained an M.A. from the Academia di Santa Cecilia, Rome and in 1962, a B.A. in English Literature from the Faculty of Arts, Cairo University. Her school leaving certificate in 1958 was obtained from the English Mission College, Cairo.

== Career ==
Erian's career on the stage of the Opera spans half a century. She is known for being the first Egyptian soprano to perform a translated international opera. In 1964, she played the role of Violetta whereby she sang Verdi's La Traviata in Arabic on the stage of the Khedivial Opera House. She was also the Director of the Cairo Opera Company and the Associate Dean of the Cairo Conservatoire.

In 2017, Erian delivered the introductory keynote speech at the La Traviata Met Live transmission at the American University in Cairo.

== Repertoire ==
Her repertoire includes most international composers for whom she sang in Italian, French, German and Russian. Those include among others: Puccini's Madama Butterfly, Tosca and La Bohème, Verdi's La Traviata, Aida and Rigoletto, Mozart's Le Nozze di Figaro, Bastien und Bastienne, and Don Giovanni, Bizet's Carmen, Handel's oratorios, etc.

Erian sang in Arabic for many Egyptian composers including Abu Bakr Khairat, Aziz El-Shawan, Hasan Rashid and Gamal Abdel Rehim among others. She sang the first ever Arabic Opera Anas el-Wugood (أنس الوجود) composed by Aziz El-Shawan based on the One Thousand and One Nights stories in 1994.

== Awards ==
- In 1964, Nabila Erian was awarded by President Gamal Abdel Nasser on the occasion of 'Id al-'Ilm" (tr. the Sciences Festival). She was the second Egyptian singer to receive this award after Umm Kalthum.
- Between the seventies and the nineties Erian obtained several international music awards from Japan (Butterfly), France, Budapest awards, Bach and Leinberg contests.

== Publications ==
- "Speculations on the Artistic Process as Cultural Identity," Bulletin of the 25th Anniversary of the Academy of Arts, Cairo, 1985.
- "Aida at the Pyramids", Cairo Today. Monthly Review, Cairo, 1984.
