= Ines Abdel-Dayem =

Egyptian musician and politician

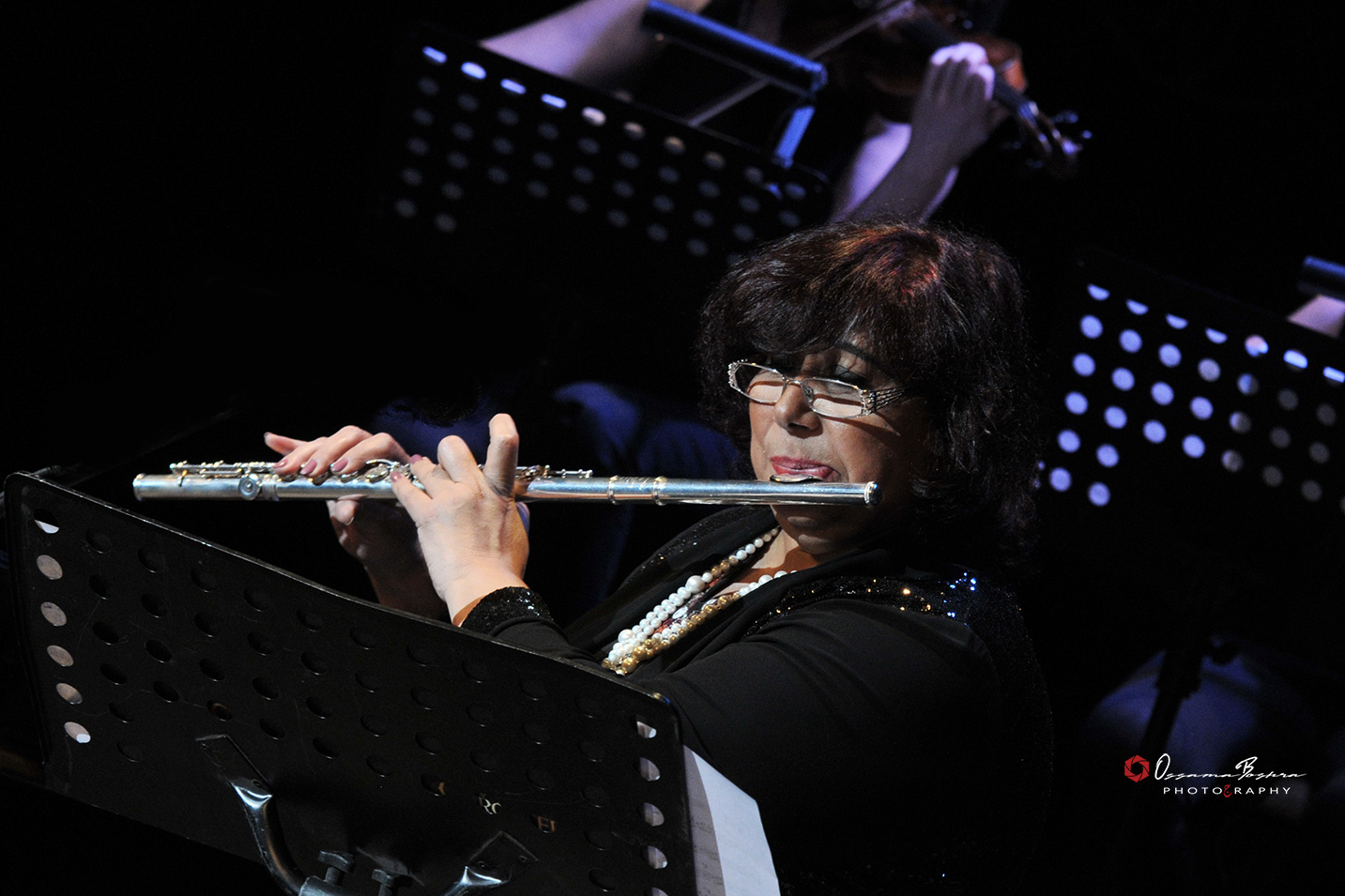

Background information
- Born: 1962 (age 63–64); Egypt
- Genres: Egyptian; Arabic classical
- Occupations: Instrumentalist, Minister of Culture of Egypt
- Instrument: Flute

Ines Abdel-Dayem is an Egyptian flute player, the former Chairwoman of the Cairo Opera House and the former Minister of Culture of Egypt (2018–2022).

== Background ==
Ines Abdel-Dayem studied at the flute department of the Cairo Conservatoire where she graduated in 1984. In 1990, she earned a performance diploma from the École Normale de Musique de Paris.

In 2003, Abdel-Dayem was appointed director of the Cairo Symphony Orchestra. In 2005, she became dean of the Cairo Conservatoire, and shortly after vice-president of the Academy of Arts.

In February 2012, Ines Abdel-Dayem became a chairperson of the Cairo Opera House. In May 2013, she lost this position after the Muslim Brotherhood came into power in the country, but was reinstated shortly after in July 2013. However, she declined an offer to become Minister of Culture of the country.

In January 2018, she was appointed Minister of Culture of Egypt. She is the second Egyptian minister to come from an artistic background. In March 2018, she appointed Mohamed Hefzy as President of the annual Cairo International Film Festival.

== Prizes ==
- 2018: German Jazz Music Award
- 2001: Egypt's State Prize in Arts
- 1982:
  - 1st prize at the Fédération Nationale des Unions des Conservatoires Municipaux
  - 1st prize at the Concours Général de Musique et d'Art Dramatique

== Related pages ==
- Cairo Opera House
