= Christopher Williams (academic) =

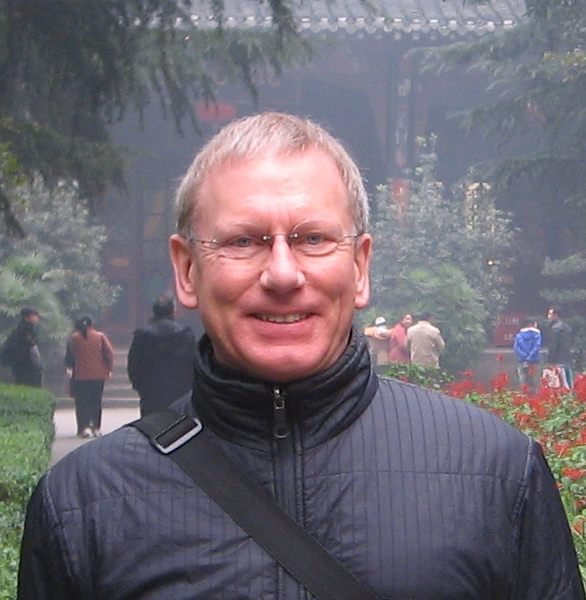
- Born: 6 September 1952 (age 74); London, England

Academic background
- Education: Guildhall School of Music and Drama

Christopher Williams (born in London) is an English academic. He held posts at the universities of Bristol, Birmingham, Cairo, Cambridge, London and the United Nations. He is an invited Fellow of the Royal Society of Arts (RSA), and magistrate.

At school he taught himself to play the trumpet and gained a place at the Guildhall School of Music and Drama, London, aged 16, studying with Bernard Brown and then Denis Clift, and later attending a masterclass in Nice with Pierre Thibaud. He then became Head of Brass teaching at Wells Cathedral School and a tutor at Dartington College of Arts. In 1980 he left the UK to teach at the Cairo Conservatoire, Egypt, working with Samha El-Kholy, and was principal trumpet of the Cairo Symphony Orchestra. Here he became interested in disadvantage and poverty, and taught at the Al Noor Wal Amal School for blind children. In 1985 he broke the cultural boycott of South Africa to be a principal trumpet with the PACT (SABC) Symphony Orchestra, to experience apartheid. He taught music in the Alexandra, Gauteng township, and co-founded the Johannesburg-based education NGO for street-working children, Street-wise, with Jill (Swart) Kruger. This became the topic of a PhD, his 'first degree'. He then held Fellowships from the Joseph Rowntree Foundation concerning disability rights, which changed to law on vulnerable witnesses including dispensing with the formal oath[2] and within the Global Environmental Change Programme.

== Books ==
- Doing international research: Global and local methods. (2015), London: Sage.
- Researching power, elites and leadership. (2012), London: Sage. ISBN 978-0-85702-429-9. ISBN 978-0-85702-428-2.
- Leadership accountability in a globalising world. (2006), Palgrave Macmillan. ISBN 978-1-4039-8696-2. ISBN 1-4039-8696-7.
- Leaders of integrity: ethics and a code for global leadership. (2001) UN University Leadership Academy: ISBN 9957-424-01-7.
- Environmental victims: new risks, new injustice, (1998) (Ed.) ISBN 1-85383-534-X. ISBN 1-85383-524-2.
- Terminus Brain. The Environmental Threats to Human Intelligence. Cassel, London/Washington (1997) ISBN 0-304-33856-7, ISBN 0-304-33857-5.
  - Endstation Gehirn. Die Bedrohung der menschlichen Intelligenz durch die Vergiftung der Umwelt. German translation by Hans-Joachim Maass. Klett-Cotta, Stuttgart 2003. ISBN 3-608-91015-8.
- Invisible victims: crime and abuse against people with learning disabilities. (1995) ISBN 1-85302-309-4.
- Enjoy playing the trumpet: First lessons for young students. Oxford University Press. 1986. ISBN 978-0-19-353496-4.
- Enjoy playing the horn: First lessons for young students. Oxford University Press. 1989. ISBN 978-0-19-353497-1.
- Enjoy playing the trombone: First lessons for young students. Oxford University Press. 1989. ISBN 978-0-19-353498-8.
- Trumpet excursions Chappell: London, (1976). http://catalogue.nla.gov.au/Record/490535

== See also ==
- Green criminology
