= Awatef Abdel Karim =

Egyptian composer of classical music (1931–2021)

- Born: 8 February 1931
- Died: 24 April 2021 (aged 90)
- Occupation: Composer

Awatef Abdel Karim (Arabic: عواطف عبدالكريم; 8 February 1931 – 24 April 2021) was an Egyptian composer of contemporary classical music. Karim was the first Egyptian female composer to formally study music composition. She composed for piano, violin, choir, and orchestra, and also wrote music for children. In 1991, she succeeded Gamal Abdel-Rahim as chairman of the composition and conducting department of the Cairo Conservatoire, serving in that position until 1997. A revised edition of her book, Music Appreciation of Nineteenth Century Music was published in 2005 in Cairo. She was awarded the State Merit Award in June 2006. Her notable students include Ahmed El-Saedi, Ali Osman, and Mohamed Abdelwahab Abdelfattah.

== Compositions ==
- Nine Pieces for Children, piano

== See also ==
- List of Egyptian composers
- Music of Egypt
