= Ali Osman (composer) =

Sudanese composer and music director

Ali Osman (Arabic: علي عثمان; 1958 in Omdurman, Sudan – February 16, 2017, in Cairo) was a Sudanese composer of contemporary classical music. He was active in Egypt's contemporary music scene and a specialist in Sudanese music. He also played the guitar, drum kit, and double bass. As artistic director and principal conductor, he worked with the Al Nour Wal Amal (Light and Hope) Orchestra for blind female musicians.

== Biography and career ==
Growing up in Sudan, Ali Osman was a self-taught rock musician playing drums and guitar. Feeling he had reached a point where he could not progress by himself, he planned to move to Canada, but in 1978 he settled in Cairo, where he was supposed to get his Canadian visa. He studied with Gamal Abdel-Rahim, Bertold Hummel and Robert Woshborn at the Cairo Conservatoire (1978–1986), and learned the double bass with Rodney Slatford. He wrote a thesis on traditional Sudanese and Arabic music. He obtained a Bachelor of Music in composition and music theory, and a Master of Music. He then pursued postgraduate studies in analysis, counterpoint and music history with Awatef Abdel Karim (1986–1990).

He taught music at the Cairo Conservatoire from 1990, and at the Arabic Higher Institute of Music in Cairo from 1999.

In 2001, he became the artistic director and principal conductor of the Al Nour Wal Amal (Light and Hope) Orchestra, which consists of visually impaired and blind women musicians. In 2000, he traveled to Switzerland, where Swiss Radio recorded his first full CD.

On March 30, 2002, he performed for the inauguration of the Bibliotheca Alexandrina. Ali Osman earned his PhD in 2009, and he died on February 16, 2017, in Cairo.

== Distinctions ==
- 1995: Third Prize in the competition Abu Bakr Khairat of the Ministry of Culture in Cairo for the Song for Chamber Orchestra
- 2000: Scholarship from the organisation Pro Helvetia

== Books ==
- Egyptian Contemporary Music (series), with Samha El-Kholy, ed. Ministry of Culture, Cairo, 2000–2003

== See also ==
- List of Egyptian composers
