= Youssef Elsisi =

Egyptian conductor

- Born: March 19, 1935 (age 90); Shibin El Kom, Egypt
- Died: November 9, 2000 (aged 65)
- Other names: Youssef El-Sisi, Youssef El Sisi
- Citizenship: Egyptian
- Occupations: conductor, music educator

Youssef Elsisi (19 March 1935 – 9 November 2000, last name also spelled El-Sisi or El Sisi) was an Egyptian conductor and music educator.

== Biography ==
Elsisi was born in Shibin El Kom, Egypt. Both his father and mother encouraged him to listen to and appreciate classical music. His interests in music later grew serious, when the family moved to Cairo in the 1940s.

His father, an engineer, wished that he would not pursue professional music, so Elsisi went to study English literature at the Cairo University in addition to continuing his music studies. In 1956, he graduated from both the Higher Institute of Music and the Cairo University in English literature. In 1961, he received a scholarship to travel to Austria and study at the Vienna Music Academy. He studied under Hans Swarowsky and graduated 1965 in both conducting and composition.

After returning from his studies, he became permanent then principal conductor and artistic director of the Cairo Symphony Orchestra performing most symphonic and operatic repertoire at the Opera House. His efforts were crucial to bringing classical music and opera performances back from a standstill, due to the destruction of the Opera House in 1972.

He pushed musicians forward to a level of performance which enabled them to play the most sophisticated pieces, such as Beethoven's Ninth Symphony and Carl Orff's Carmina Burana. He also brought classical music to audiences outside of Cairo and presented concerts in Alexandria and upper Egypt. He was the first conductor to perform open-air concerts in summer seasons in Cairo reaching classical music to a wider range of audiences.

He was awarded Ordre des Arts et des Lettres (Order of Arts and Literature) by the French government 1983 and the Liszt Memorial Plaque by the Hungarian government 1986 for his contributions to music in Egypt.

Among contemporary Egyptian composers music he included in his performances were Aziz El-Shawan, Gamal Abdel-Rahim, Sayed Awad, Rageh Daoud, Abou-Bakr Khairat and others.

He was awarded the Egyptian State's Decoration of Arts 1989 for his efforts in promoting of Egyptian national music in Egypt and abroad.

As a visiting professor for graduate studies he lectured on musicology and music appreciation at most music institutions in Cairo. In 1990 he became a Fulbright grant recipient and taught at the Eastman School of Music in the United States. He also taught in Kuwait, South Korea, and Japan. His students include Adel Kamel, Mohamed Abdelwahab Abdelfattah, and Omar Khairat.

Youssef Elsisi died in Cairo on 9 November 2000, of a heart attack.

== Honors and awards ==
- 1983 Ordre des Arts et des Lettres (Order of Arts and Literature) from the French government.
- 1986 Liszt Memorial Plaque from the Hungarian government.
- 1989 Egyptian State's Decoration of Arts.
- 1989/1990 Fulbright grant recipient.
