= Anas el-Wugood =

Anas el-Wugood is an opera in Arabic by the Egyptian composer Aziz El-Shawan. It was written in 1970 but not premiered until 1994. The premiere of the opera took place at the replaced Khedivial Opera House, funded by the Japanese government as part of a newly constructed National Cultural Centre in Zamalek.

The plot is based on a character from the Arabian Nights, Uns el Wujud "Delight of the World," who was beloved by the fair Zahar el-Waard "Flower of the Rose".

== Roles ==
- Nabila Erian (Uns el Wujud)
