= Mona Ghoneim =

Egyptian composer and pianist

- Born: January 1, 1955 (age 70); Cairo
- Occupations: Composer; Pianist

Mona Ghoneim (Arabic: منى غنيم; b. 1955; first name also spelled Mauna) is an Egyptian composer of contemporary classical music and pianist. She is a member of that nation's third generation of such composers.

Ghoneim studied piano with E. Puglisi and composition with Gamal Abdel-Rahim at the Cairo Conservatoire beginning in 1962; she graduated with a degree in composition in 1977 and in 1978 with a degree in piano. She holds a doctorate from the University of Music and Performing Arts, Vienna, and serves as a professor in the Conducting and Composition Department at the Cairo Conservatoire. She is married to Rageh Daoud (b. 1954), who is also an Egyptian composer.

She has composed chamber, vocal, and piano music, as well as music for the documentary film Desert Safari.

== Compositions ==
- Fantasia for piano and string orchestra

== See also ==
- List of Egyptian composers
