= Greiss (surname) =

Greiss is a surname, and may refer to:

- Thomas Greiss (born 1986), German ice hockey player
- Yusef Greiss (1899–1961), Egyptian composer
- Phil Greiss
- Hisham Greiss, Egyptian athlete
