= Sherif Mohie El Din =

Egyptian conductor and composer

- Born: May 28, 1964 (age 62); Cairo
- Occupations: Conductor; Horn player; Composer

Sherif Mohie El Din (Arabic: شريف محي الدين; born May 28, 1964; surname also spelled Mohie Eldin or Mohieddin) is an Egyptian conductor and composer. He is a member of Egypt's third generation of composers.

He was formerly the Artistic Director and Principal Conductor of the Cairo Opera Orchestra. In 2001 he was appointed Director of the Arts Center of the newly established Bibliotheca Alexandrina in Alexandria, Egypt, and has been since 2002 the conductor of the Bibliotheca Alexandrina String Orchestra.

He graduated in composition, under the late composer Gamal Abdel-Rahim, founder of the Composition Department of the Cairo Conservatoire, Academy of Arts, as well as the Wind Department (horn) in 1986.

Appointed Demonstrator, Musicology Department, he obtained his master's degree in 1995, and his degree in conducting from the École Normale de Musique de Paris in Paris under Maestro Dominique Rouits in the same year.

Mohie El Din has written two operas based on Egyptian contemporary novels, the latest on Naguib Mahfouz's novel Miramar, both with librettos by the renowned Egyptian poet Sayed Heggab, a number of concertos for Arabic and Western instruments, song cycles, sonatas for several solo instruments, and many chamber works for different instrumental combinations.

His works have been recorded on CDs, and he is a frequent guest on Egyptian television and radio programs. He appeared in the 2001 Youssef Chahine film Skoot Hansawwar.

== See also ==
- List of Egyptian composers
