= Hassan Rasheed =

Hassan Rasheed may refer to

- Hasan Rashid (1896-1969), Egyptian composer and operatic baritone
- Hassan Rasheed (politician), Malidivan Minister of Defence
- Rashed Hassan, Emirati footballer
- Rashid Hassan, South African economist
