= Omar Khairat =

Egyptian musician

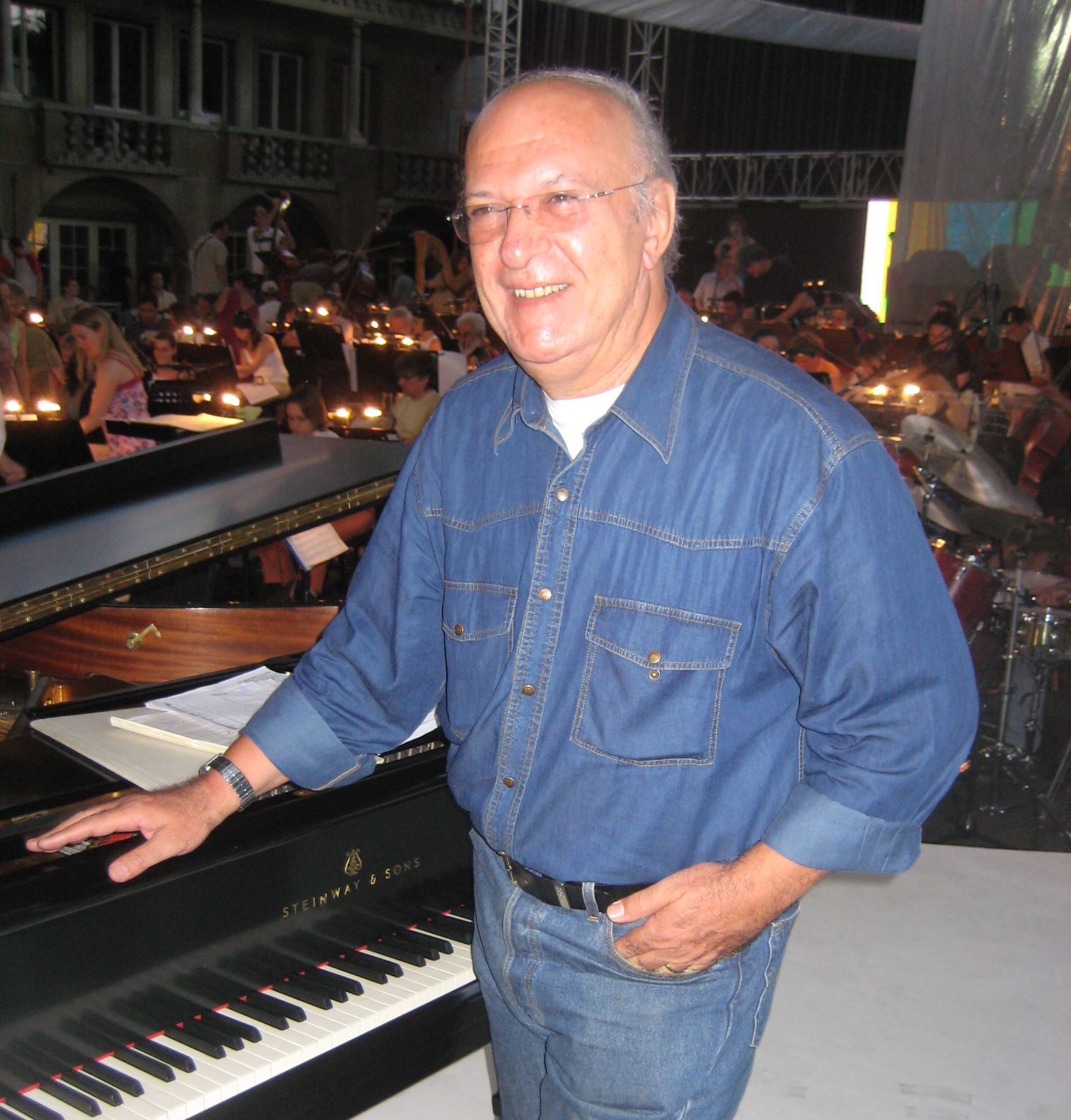

Background information
- Born: November 11, 1948 (age 77); Cairo, Egypt
- Genres: Egyptian music
- Occupations: Musician, composer
- Instrument: Piano

Omar Khairat (Arabic: عمر خيرت; born November 11, 1948) is an Egyptian musician, song writer and composer. He has gained recognition for his versatile talents as a composer, pianist, conductor and arranger.

== Early life ==
Born in Cairo, Omar was raised in a family of musicians. His uncle, Abu Bakr Khairat, a composer and architect, established the Cairo Conservatoire.

== Career ==
Omar was the main drummer for the Egyptian rock band Les Petits Chats until 1971.

== Works ==
In January 2019, Omar Khairat performed a live concert in al-Ula, Saudi Arabia. He has performed across North Africa, the Middle East, and Europe with appearances in numerous countries including Russia, Spain, Italy, Slovenia, Saudi Arabia, Kuwait, UAE, Oman, Bharain, Qatar, Morocco and Tunisia.

== See also ==
- List of Egyptian composers
- Music of Egypt
