= Simsimiyya =

Traditional Egyptian string instrument

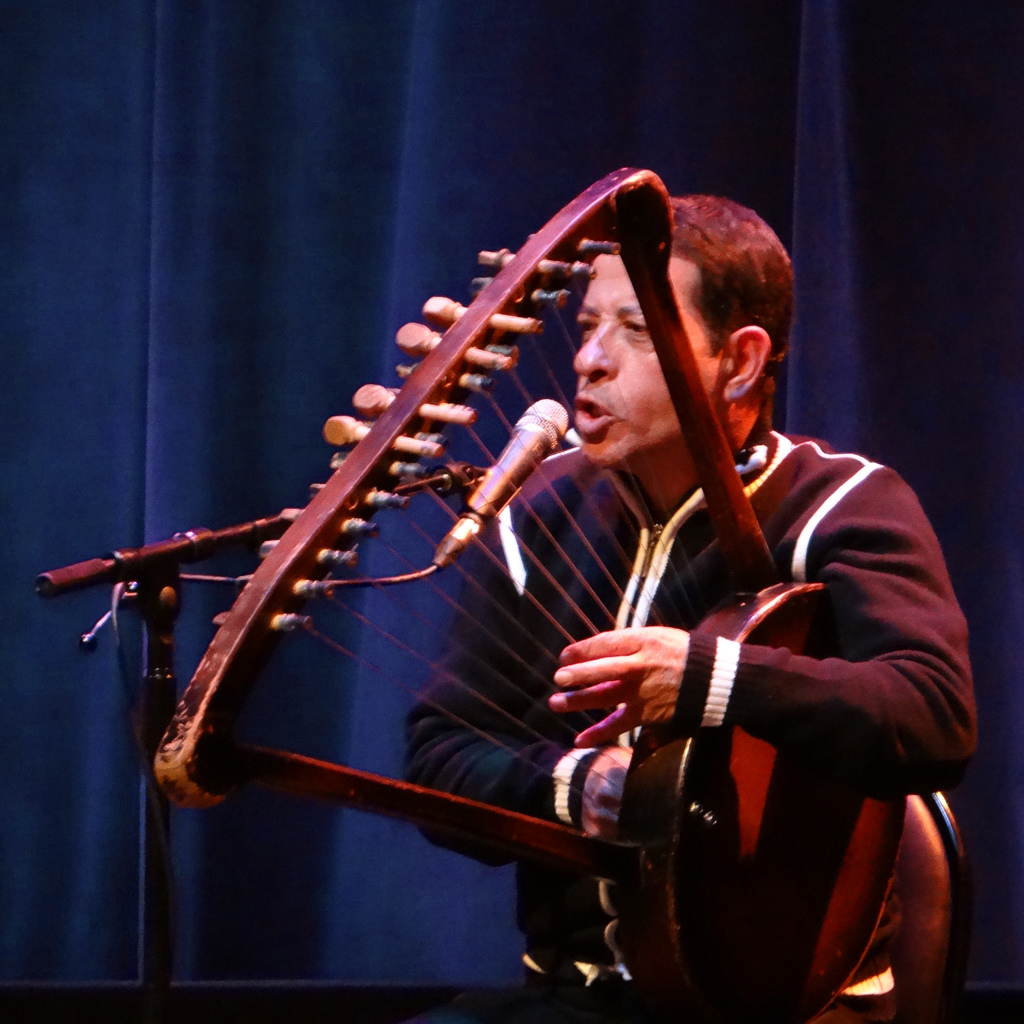
- A simsimiyya being played by an Egyptian band.
- Classification: Stringed instruments

Semsemiah: instrument crafting and playing
- UNESCO Intangible Cultural Heritage
- Country: Egypt
- Reference: 02119
- Region: Ancient Egypt

Inscription history
- Inscription: 2024 (19th session)
- List: Representative

The simsimiyya (Arabic: سمسمية or سنسمية simsimyya/sinsimiyya; pl. simsimiyyāt/sinsimiyyāt, سمسميات) is a box or bowl lyre used in Egypt. Models exist with both circular soundboxes as well as rectangular. In the past, Egyptian models had 5 strings. The strings are held in place by pegs instead of tuning rings. Today, images of the instrument in Egypt may show 12 strings. It has been played since ancient times.

It is used in Egypt in certain genres of Egyptian music, including Sawahli (coastal) music, which is a type of popular Egyptian music from the country's northern coast. The simsimiyya was probably introduced to the country's northern coast from the Nile valley in the 19th century by Egyptian workers in the Suez canal. It is also used in other genres of Egyptian music. Well-known Egyptian bands that feature the simsimiyya as a main instrument include El Tanbura, which uses other Egyptian instruments.

The simsimiyya is often used to accompany Egyptian musicians known as suhbagiyya, in the cities of Port Said, Ismailia, and Suez.

It is sometimes used in other countries neighboring Egypt as well, including Libya, Jordan, and Saudi Arabia.

In Saudi Arabia and Yemen, it supports traditional songs and Bedouin narratives, symbolizing cultural continuity. The instrument’s revival, led by groups like El Tanbura in the 1980s, has preserved its heritage, earning UNESCO recognition in 2024 for its role in intangible cultural heritage. Its bright, melodic tones resonate in both festive and reflective settings, bridging past and present.

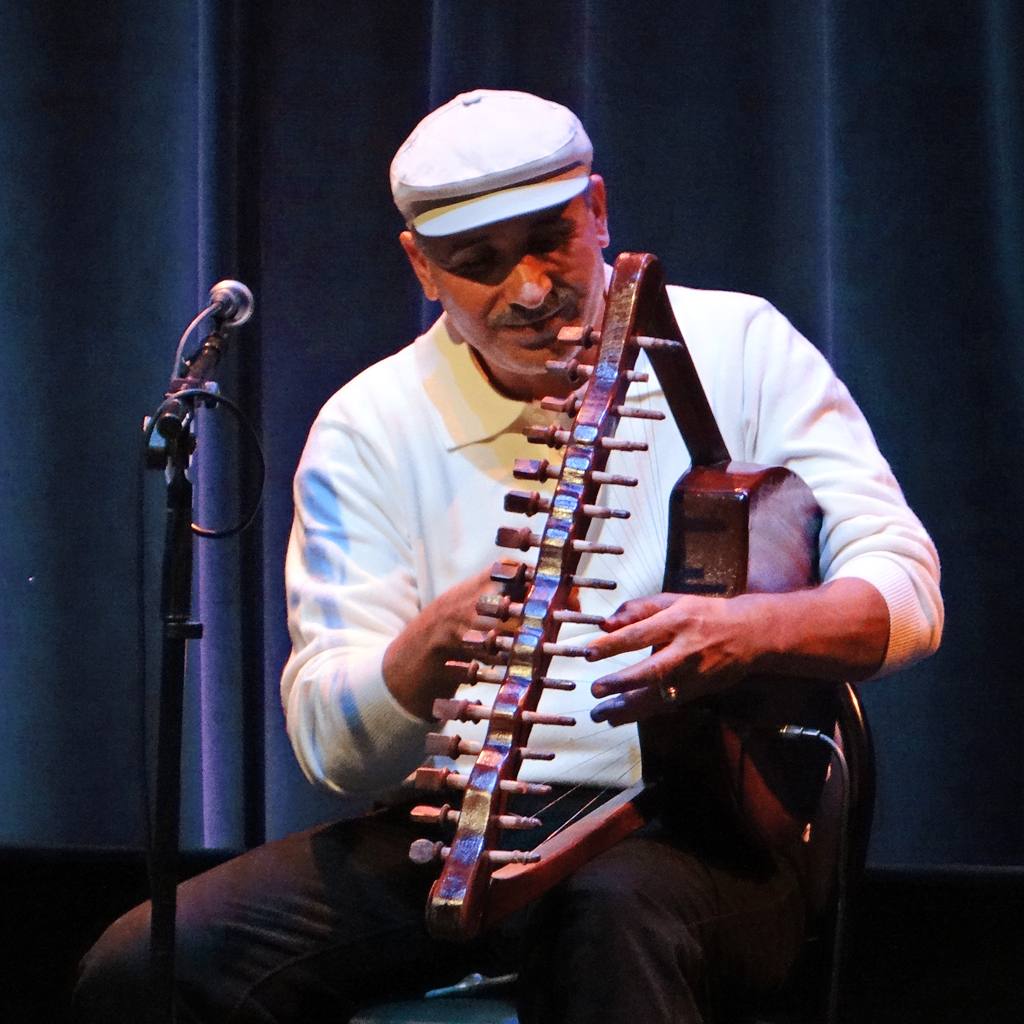
A simsimiyya being played by Hassan aka Mohsen El 'Ashry of El Tanbura.

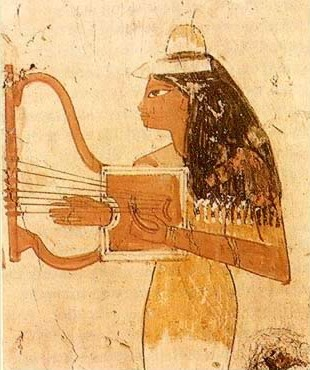
Ancient Egyptian lyre.

== See also ==
- Kissar
- Krar
- Tanbūra
- el-Tanboura
- Music of Egypt
