= Mohamed Abdelwahab Abdelfattah =

Egyptian contemporary classical music composer

Mohamed Abdelwahab Abdelfattah (Arabic: محمد عبد الوهاب عبد الفتاح; born 1962) is an Egyptian composer of contemporary classical music and educator. He is a member of Egypt's third generation of classical composers.

== Biography ==
Abdelfattah was born in Giza. He graduated with a B.A. degree from the College of Applied Arts of Helwan University, Orman campus in Egypt and went on to attain second and third B.A. degrees from the Faculty of Composition and Department of Ear Training (Solfege) at the same year 1986, from the Cairo Conservatoire, with "excellent honors". In Egypt he studied composition under Gamal Abdel-Rahim, music history under Samha El-Kholy, harmony under Awatef Abdel Karim, counterpoint under Laiela El-Saiyad, instrumentation under Gihad Dawoud, orchestration under Youssef Elsisi, score reading under Gamal Salama, Schenkerian analysis under Ahmed El-Saedi, music education under Ikram Matter and solfege under Aiyda Danial.

Abdelfattah was appointed to the faculty at Cairo Conservatoire in 1987, and he later obtained his M.A. degree, with his thesis entitled "Dodecaphony and Maqamat" from the Academy of Arts in Cairo in 1990, supervised by Awatef Abdel Karim.

Abdelfattah received a scholarship in 1990 to study composition in Austria. He first studied composition in Graz and later in Vienna. He studied electroacoustic and experimental music under Dieter Kaufmann, where he obtained the qualification of Master of Arts in composition, from the University of Music and Performing Arts, Vienna in 1996. This degree was transferred to a Ph.D. in Egypt in 1998 from the Academy of Arts University and the Minister of Higher Education. After his return to Egypt, he was promoted at the Cairo Conservatoire to assistant professor in 1989 and to associate professor in 2003.

Abdelfattah is a multidisciplinary artist who combines many fields in his compositions such as poetry, painting, photography, and cinema montage, and presents them simultaneously and unconventionally using computer technology. He mixes the tone color of Egyptian traditional melodies with sound effects of machines, tools, and the sounds of daily life. He presented his first experimental and acoustic music concert in Egypt at the Cairo Opera House on November 22, 1999. Abdelfattah's works have been covered in both public and cultural media, where he has been quoted as being a comprehensive artist and a multi-media music pioneer in Egypt and the Arab countries. He has written some movements in modern graphic notation, under the title Nine Miniatures for String Quartet, premiered in Rome on December 2, 1999. He is also the first Egyptian composer to have written a composition with a specific music notation for the deaf. He has established a chamber percussion ensemble consisting entirely of deaf students in Egypt where he conducted them to perform a visual music composition under the title Seeing the Sound in a public concert at the Cairo Opera House on March 29, 2005.

Over the last five years, Abdel-Wahab has focused on research and published two books about orchestration and creating sound. In his most recent booklet "Sound Scenography", entitled also Seeing the Sound, published in two volumes, (Academy of Arts University in Cairo), 2005, he writes about his unique experience related to embodied art and music. In this book he discusses new sound and musical terms, what he calls "Sound Theatricalization & Filmlization"—the translation of the dramatic feeling of any sound event into a specific visual display on the stage. He has also written several articles in Arabic cultural journals about contemporary composition and how to find practical functions for music within society. His interests include writing applied music compositions for the deaf and comic music to help with depression. He has cooperated with several Egyptian biologists and physicians to study the effectiveness of sound vibrations on the human bones and sound frequencies on blood pressure and brain function. He composed a therapeutic work utilizing water sound effects for depression, which was performed at Maadi Hospital in Cairo in 2006.

During the 2007–2009 academic year, he was a visiting professor at Boston University. He is currently a visiting lecturer at Salem State University.

He frequently combines Eastern and Western elements, reflecting his view of the importance of cross-cultural experience. Beyond merely creating art for art's sake, Abdelfattah envisions a vital social role for his art in establishing cross-cultural dialogue and understanding, particularly between the Western and Arab peoples.

== Writings ==
- Abdel Fattah, Mohamed Abdel-Wahab (1993). "Melody in the Music of Gamal Abdel-Rahim." In Festschrift for Gamal Abdel-Rahim, ed. Samha El-Kholy and John Robison (The Binational Fulbright Commission in Egypt), pp. 85–117.
- Abdelfattah, Mohamed Abdelwahab (1999). "Tone-Color Composition." Afaaq, Magazine of the Egyptian Ministry of Culture. Supreme Cultural Council, Cairo.

== Recordings ==
- As Short as Possible (String Quartet No. 1) La Tache Alea-01-97, works by Gerhard Präsent, Iván Erőd, Herbert Blendinger, M.Abdel-Fattah / ALEA Ensemble
- 1995 – Conserved Ex 256–2, various composers
