= List of Egyptian composers =

The following is a list of Egyptian music composers.

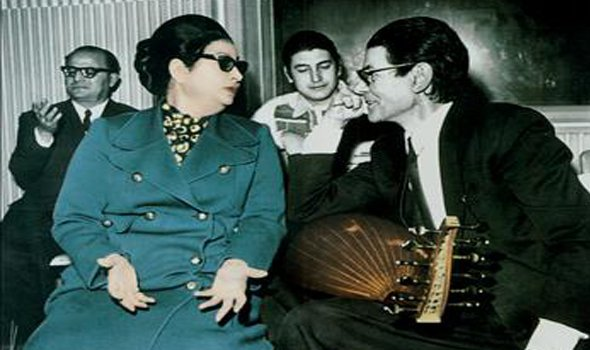
Riad El Sunbati sitting with Umm Kulthum. Back left - Mohamed Abdel Wahab.

== Pioneers ==
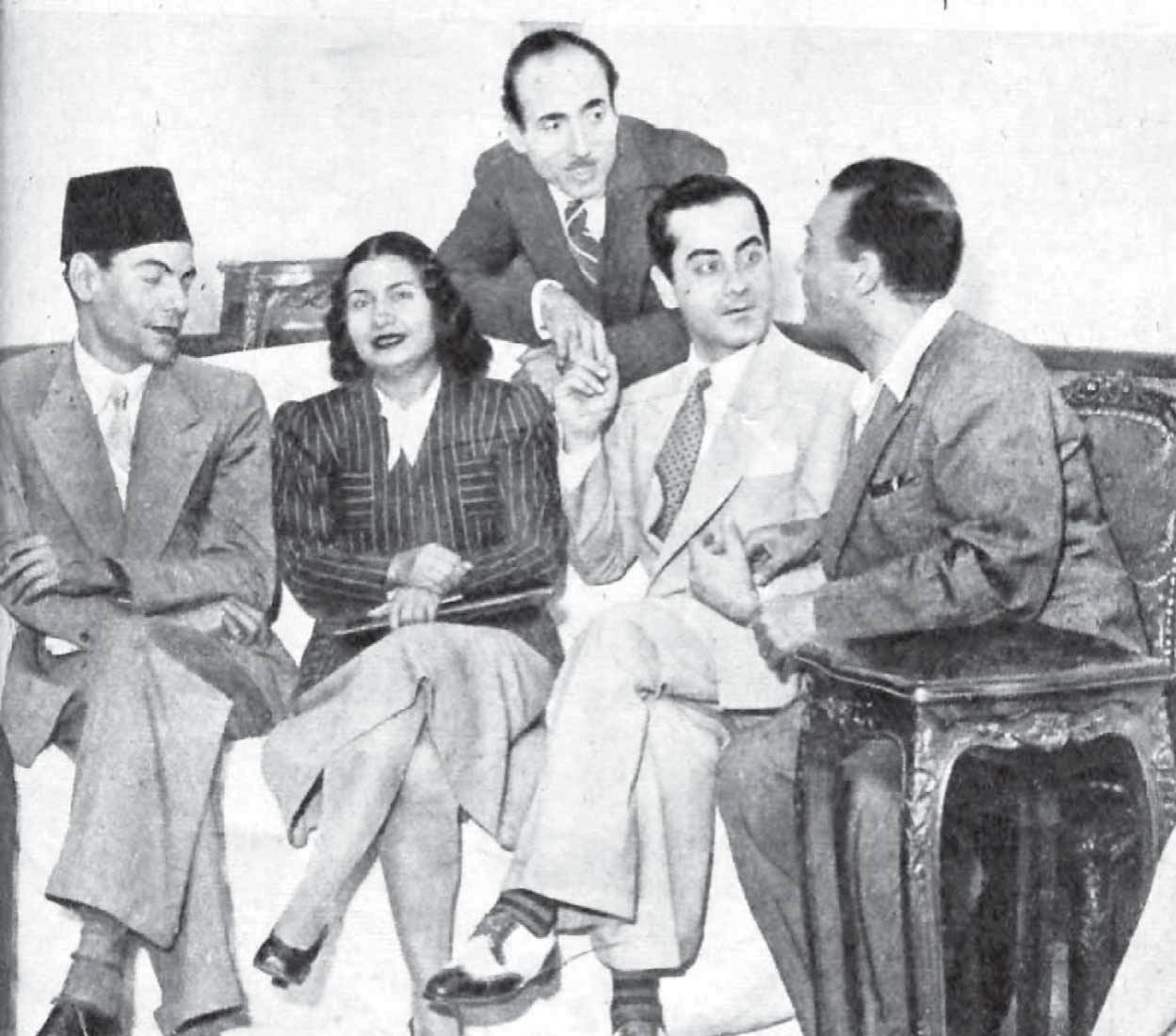
From left: Riad El Sunbai, Umm Kulthum, Mohamed El Qasabgi, Farid al-Atrash, Zakariya Ahmad

According to the work of the Egyptian musicologist Samha El-Kholy, the first generation of Egyptians to begin writing in modern Egyptian classical style were born around the turn of the 20th century.

Among the most celebrated composers in Egyptian history who lived in the 20th century are Sayed Darwish, Mohamed El Qasabgi, Baligh Hamdi, Mohamed Fawzi, Zakariya Ahmad, Mohamed Abdel Wahab, Riad El Sunbati and many others.

== First generation ==
- Sayed Darwish (1892–1923)
- Mohamed El Qasabgi (1892–1966)
- Zakariya Ahmad (1896–1961)
- Yusef Greiss (1899–1961)
- Abu Bakr Khairat (1910–1963)
- Hasan Rashid (1896–1969)
- Aziz El-Shawan (1916–1993)
- Dawood Hosni (1870–1937)

== Second generation ==
- Mohamed Abdel Wahab (1902–1991)
- Riad El Sunbati (1906–1981)
- Farid al-Atrash (1910–1974)
- Kamel El-Remali (b. 1922),
- Awatef Abdel Karim (1931–2021)
- Gamal Abdel-Rahim (1924–1988)
- Sayed Awad (1926–2000)
- Halim El-Dabh (1921–2017)
- Aziz El-Shawan (1916–1993)
- Soliman Gamil (1924–1994)
- Rifaat Garrana (1929–2017)
- Tarek Ali Hassan (born 1937)
- Ezz Eddin Hosni (1927–2013)

== Third generation ==
- Baligh Hamdi (1932–1993)
- Rageh Daoud (born 1954)
- Omar Khayrat (born 1949)
- Mona Ghoneim (born 1955)
- Sherif Nour (born 1958)
- Mohamed Abdelwahab Abdelfattah (born 1962)
- Sherif Mohie El Din (born 1964)
- Ali Osman (1958–2017)
- Adel Kamel (1942–2003)

== Fourth generation ==
- Hesham Nazih (born 1972)
- Hisham Kharma
- Mohamed Diab (born 1993)

== See also ==
- Opera in Arabic
