= Sayed Awad =

Egyptian composer (1926–2000)

- Born: January 1, 1926
- Died: January 1, 2000 (aged 74)
- Citizenship: Egypt
- Occupations: Composer; Film score composer

Sayed Awad (1926–2000; Arabic: سيد عواد) was an Egyptian composer of contemporary classical music. He began his career as a violinist for the orchestra of the Cairo Opera House and later lived in Jordan. He studied in Moscow with the Russian violinist and conductor David Oistrakh and received a Ph.D. in music there in 1968.

Sayed Awad was a music teacher at Yarmouk University (Irbid, Jordan) from 1982-1986, he taught; violin, music theory and history.

Awad had a lot of influence on the music movement in Jordan and Egypt, he was the first one to compose an orchestral work for the Oud and the orchestra, which was dedicated to his student and close friend Seifed Din Abdoun.

He is best known for his Yarmouk Symphony, and for his three-act opera The Death of Cleopatra, which is based on the epic poem by Ahmed Shawqi.

== See also ==
- List of Egyptian composers
