= Tarek Ali Hassan =

Egyptian composer and endocrinologist (1937–2024)

Tarek Ali Hassan (Arabic: طارق على حسن, 19 October 1937 – 8 September 2024) was an Egyptian endocrinologist who was a professor of medicine and chief of endocrinology at Al-Azhar University in Cairo. He was also a composer, musician, writer, painter, and philosopher. His music, in a modern polyphonic style, had been performed in Egypt and in many countries.

Hassan published major dramatic works in English and in Arabic."Dr. Tarek Ali Hassan Articles". December 2017.

He was a member of Ordre des Arts et des Lettres and his name was recorded in the International Who's Who in Music 11th edition 1988 for his great contribution in the music world.

He was chairman of the Zenab Kamel Hassan Foundation for Holistic Human Development, which works on human development and empowerment issues in the Imbaba district of Cairo."ZKH foundation". December 2017.

Hassan made great contributions in the society especially in medicine and music field besides representing one of the central values of human being and he saw that "We need a really modern constitution, which protects the rights of intellectual inquiry and freedom of thought. So far we have not had any of that" and other details were mentioned at his interview with Al-Ahram.

Hassan died on 6 September 2024, at the age of 86.

== Beliefs ==
Tarek Hassan's philosophy involves "a deep belief in that human beings are a unique evolutionary breakthrough.""Dr. Tarek Ali Hassan's Biography". December 2017.

He was a critic of "static models in science, and in the humanities". To him, "the model of Homo sapiens sapiens is not Achilles or Agamemnon but Osiris, Mozart, and Gandhi.""Dr. Tarek Ali Hassan's Biography". December 2017. He believes that "survival and thriving by creativity is a major unique human breakthrough which is destroyed by violence.""Dr. Tarek Ali Hassan's Biography". December 2017.

Some of Hassan's music works have been played at the new Cairo Opera. "Cairo opera website". December 2017. and he was founding chairman of the new Cairo Opera the national cultural centre.

He also had numerous historical beliefs and made a lot of studies that describe the economical, religious and political changes in the current situation through the history studies especially in Al-Azhar entity. ""Oral History interview of Tarek Ali Hassan by the AUC". December 2017. In 1991, he was presented with France's highest arts decoration: he was made a Commander in the Ordre des Arts et des Lettres (Order of Arts and Literature), the highest rank for this award, for "his services to International Culture, drama and International communication and violence-resolution.
