= El Tanbura =

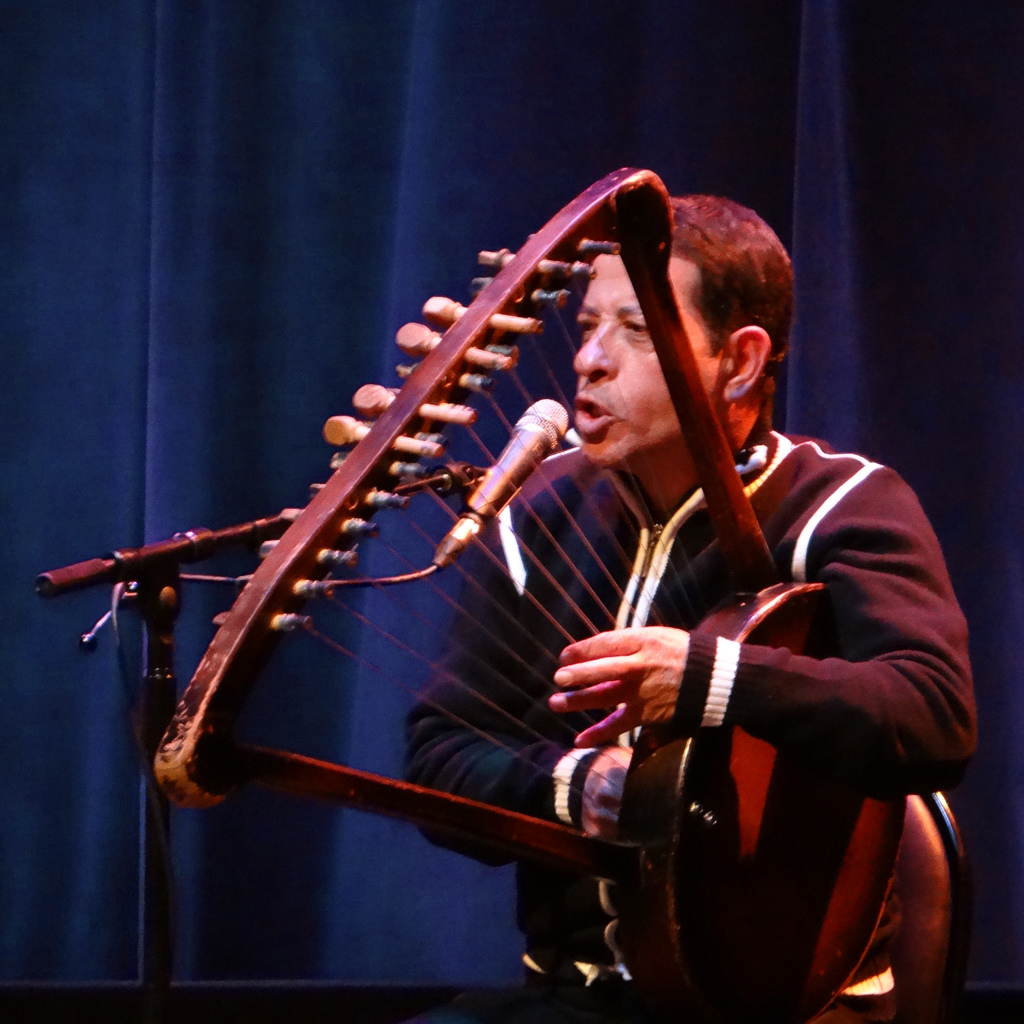

Background information
- Origin: Egypt
- Genres: Egyptian folk music
- Years active: 1999–present
- Website: eltanbura.org/press/

El Tanbura is an Egyptian band, formed in the 1980s. Its performances are based on traditional Egyptian music, featuring the simsimiyya and tanbura instruments.

== History ==
El Tanbura was formed in Port Said in the late 1980s by Zakaria Ibrahim, the organizer. His aim was to revive traditional Egyptian music.

In 1989, a small nucleus of veteran performers recruited by Zakaria came together to form the fledgling El Tanbura group, augmented by younger singers. In the formative years, El Rayis Imbabi, one of the group members, was responsible for passing key repertoire from Port Said's past to the younger members.

By 1996 the group's reputation had spread to Paris and a series of performances resulted in El Tanbura's first international CD, La Simsimiyya de Port Said, recorded live at Institute Du Monde Arabe. A second disc Between the Desert and the Sea (named by Songlines Magazine as one of the all-time Top 50 world music albums) followed a decade later as the group began a long association with producer Michael Whitewood and the UK record label 30 IPS. The band performed to both public and critical success at the Barbican's Ramadan Nights festival in 2006 and across mainland Europe in 2007, also finding time to collaborate with the film-makers 1 Giant Leap on 2008's "What About Me?" In 2009, the latest album of El Tanbura, Friends of Bamboute, celebrating the band's 20th anniversary, was published.

Early in 2011 the band participated in the Egyptian revolution, campaigning for social, political and cultural reform in Egypt and performing for the protesters in Cairo's Tahrir Square. Following the Revolution El Tanbura performed at WOMAD Abu Dhabi and returned to London in a show curated for the Barbican featuring the band alongside fellow musical revolutionaries Azza Balba, Mustafa Said and Ramy Essam. The band won the Roskilde Festival World Music Award for Zakaria's El Mastaba Centre for Egyptian Popular Music at WOMEX 2011 in Copenhagen.

== Instruments used ==
=== Simsimiyya ===
This instrument is largely specialized to the people of this region of the Arab world, despite it making appearances in other desert communities as well. The simsimiyya is a five-stringed instrument of the lyre family. Originally, the body was made of wood in a bowl/box shape, covered with stretched goat or camel skin. The strings, once various intestinal parts, are now made of wire. Sometimes a can was used as an "amplifier." The instrument has five strings and is tuned using diatonic notes with a neutral third, minor third, or major third. The minor third is the most common tuning variation. The names of the strings are Buma, Duka, Watar, Huseini, and Sararah. The playing is largely rhythmic, given that there is an emphasis within the group on percussion. The form is predominantly call and response, and an appreciative and active audience is expected. The repertoire selectively features songs from a variety of sources: the radio, folk tunes, and songs from the Bedouin community. The simsimiyya is a fisherman's instrument; it is related to instruments in Ethiopia, Sudan, Yemen, and Saudi; and the Bedouin people of Sinai consider the simsimiyya as part of the Red Sea musical territory. In modern contexts, it has been found in other coastal communities along the Red Sea.

=== Tanbura ===
The tanbura is a large six-string lyre. It was often used in private healing ceremonies during the 19th century following the Egyptian conquest of Sudan.

The Tanbura is very similar to the Simsimiyya. However, compared to the Simsimiyya, the strings of the Tanbura are softer and it has the addition of tuning pegs which can expand melodic range and nylon replacing dried animal gut strings, allowing for more refined tuning and intricate performances.

The Tanbura became one of the fundamental instruments of El Tanbura. There are many performances with the Tanbura featured on Between the Desert and the Sea, which was played by Mohamed Shohib.

=== The Siren ===
The origins of both instruments are traced in Zakaria Ibrahim's short documentary film called The Siren, which often shows at Egyptological events coinciding with El Tanbura tour dates.

== Albums ==
=== La Simsimiyya de Port Said ===
This first album of El Tanbura was published in 1999.

=== Ahwa Qamar ===
This album was published in 2003. It was the gathering of the band's most requested songs from their weekly concerts at Port Said's Meqma Café. It was produced by the El Mastaba Center for Egyptian Folk Music in Cairo studio. The album material can be found in the soundtrack to Philippe Dib's film El Tanbura: Capturing a vanishing spirit.

=== Between the Desert and the Sea ===
This is the third album of El Tanbura and was released in 2006. It involved a mix of Egyptian folk melodies, Sufi verses and sea shanties from antiquity. El Tanbura used the Arabian grooves to play with the sound of the simsimiyya and underpinned.

=== Friends of Bamboute: 20th Anniversary Edition ===
This is the latest album of El Tanbura and was released in 2009. The album was produced to celebrate their two decades as the guardians of simsimiyya. It was recorded in Cairo and on location in Port Said, and recounts tales of the 19th century Bambutiyya merchants who frequented the old-time cafés and smoking dens along the path of the Suez Canal and also showcases devotional Sufi songs from the Egyptian Delta.
