= Aziz El-Shawan =

Egyptian composer (1916–1993)

- Born: May 16, 1916; Cairo, Egypt
- Origin: Cairo, Egypt
- Died: May 14, 1993 (aged 76) Cairo, Egypt
- Genres: Classical
- Occupation: Composer
- Instrument: Piano

Aziz El-Shawan (born Cairo, May 6, 1916; died Cairo, May 14, 1993) was one of the most prominent Egyptian composers of the twentieth century.

== Biography ==
He completed his primary and secondary education at the St. Joseph – La Salle College in Khoronfish, Cairo where he also received a Higher Diploma in Commercial Studies. He studied the violin privately with the German Joseph von Aubervon, a student of Jan Kubelick, and joined the school's choir and band where he played the clarinet and French horn. His violin teacher obtained a scholarship for him to study at the Berlin Conservatory, however, his father objected to his interest in pursuing a musical career. An accident disabled one of the fingers of his left hand, obliging him to give up his dream of being a virtuoso violinist. He then studied piano, theory, harmony, composition and orchestration with the Italian Menato and the Russian Orlovitsky who were part of a community of European musicians and music teachers who lived and worked in cosmopolitan Cairo.

El-Shawan held several administrative positions, most importantly at the Philips International Company where he founded a record production department. He was director of the Soviet Cultural Center in Cairo from 1952 up to 1967. This position enabled him to travel to Moscow in 1956 where some of his early works were performed by the Radio Moscow Orchestra conducted by Aram Khatchaturian and published on LP by the Melodiya state record company, including the Fantasia for Orchestra (1945), the Symphonic Poem ‘Atshan Ya Sabay (1946), and the overture of Opera ‘Antara (1947). He also came in contact with the music of several contemporary composers, most notably the Russian Dmitri Shostakovich (1906-1975), the Armenian Aram Khatchturian (1903 – 1978) and the Azerbaijanis Uzeyir Hajibeyov (1885 – 1948), Kara Karayev (1918 -1982) and Fikret Amirov (1922 – 1984). In addition to the influence of Rachmaninov and the Russian Five, El-Shawan saw the style of these west and central Asian composers as a model of a contemporary musical idiom inspired in traditional music. In Cairo, some of his early works were premiered in 1954 at the American University's Ewart Memorial Hall by a private orchestra that he hired and conducted as the state funded Cairo Symphony Orchestra had not yet been founded.

Aram Khatchturian visited Cairo in 1960 and upon hearing El-Shawan's compositions invited him to study with him at the Moscow Conservatory, an invitation which he accepted having lived and studied in the Soviet capital from 1967 to 1969. In 1968, his Symphonic Poem Abu Simbel and his piano concerto were performed by the Moscow Cinema Orchestra conducted by Aram Khatchaturian with Alexander Bakhtchiev as soloist. In the same year, both works were issued on LP by the Soviet state label Melodia, and in 1972 by the Egyptian Ministry of Culture and Information. Following his return to Cairo, El-Shawan dedicated his time entirely to composition, having also been consultant for Cinema, Theatre and Music Organizations of the Ministry of Culture (1969 – 1976) and professor of composition and orchestration at the Arabic Music Institute (1970 – 1993). In the 1970s, he spent time in East Germany where his Ballet Isis and Osiris was choreographed and recorded by the Leipzig Opera Orchestra. The planned premier of his Ballet in East Berlin did not materialize due to the deteriorating political relations between Egypt and East Germany.

== Music ==
El-Shawan's compositions fall into three periods. In the first (c. 1945 – 1955) he wrote chamber music, the symphonic poem ‘Atchan Ya Sabay, his first symphony, the Opera ‘Antara, and music for two films. In the second period, (1955 – 1965), he composed large scale works, most notably the Piano Concerto, the Symphonic Pictures Abu Simbel, four patriotic cantatas for soloists and choral, the third symphony and several chamber works. In the third period (1966– 1993) he composed the ballet Isis and Osiris, the first opera in the Arabic language, Anas Al-Wugud, the Oman Symphony as well as numerous chamber music works.

The Cairo Symphony Orchestra has regularly performed El-Shawan's music. In addition, the London Symphony Orchestra performed and recorded his Oman Symphony in 1984 in Muscat. His opera Anas Al-Wugud was premiered at the Cairo Opera House in 1996 and featured in several opera seasons since then.

El-Shawan created an Egyptian musical idiom within the framework of Western tonal music, which he conceived of as an “international musical language.” His style is characterized by the centrality of lyrical melodies with a modal flavor, some inspired by traditional music, and a chromatic harmonic language. In his vocal works, he explores the expressive potential of the phonetics of the Arabic language. In his Oman Symphony, El-Shawan expands his musical vocabulary, incorporating rhythmic and melodic characteristics of Omani traditional music.

In addition to his work as a composer and teacher, El-Shawan published four books of music appreciation for the general public.

== Accolades ==
In recognition of his achievements, Aziz El-Shawan received the Egyptian Ministry of Culture's first prize in composition in 1956, the Egyptian Government's Arts and Sciences Award of the first order in 1967 and the Oman order of the Arts granted by the Sultan Qaboos in 1984.

== Personal life ==
His daughter, Professor Salwa El-Shawan Castelo-Branco, is an Ethnomusicologist and teaches at the New University of Lisbon in Lisbon, Portugal.

== See also ==
- List of Egyptian composers
- List of Copts
- Lists of Egyptians
