= Rageh Daoud =

Egyptian composer (born 1954)

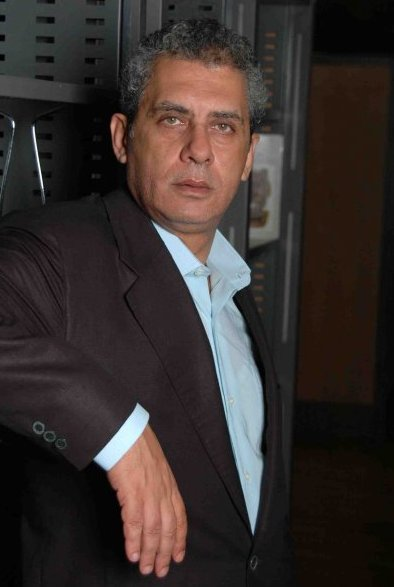
Rageh Daoud

Rageh Sami Daoud (Arabic: راجح داود; born November 23, 1954; first name also spelled Ragueh and last name also spelled Dawood) is an Egyptian composer of contemporary classical music. He is a member of that nation's third generation of such composers. He has composed for piano, voice, and orchestra, and has written a number of film scores.

== Life and career ==
Rageh Daoud was born in Cairo. He began his studies at the Cairo Conservatoire at the age of nine, later studying composition there with Gamal Abdel-Rahim, graduating in 1977. He also studied piano with Ettore Puglisi. While continuing his piano studies with him, he attended the composition class which the late Gamal Abdel-Rahim had founded at the Conservatoire, where he studied with him composition, the theory of traditional Arab modes and contemporary composition.

In 1977 he obtained his diploma in musical composition with honors. He was appointed assistant at the Composition Dept. of the Conservatoire in 1978. In 1981 he got a scholarship to pursue post graduate studies in composition at the Vienna Music Academy, where he studied with Prof. T. Christian David and the British Frances Burt. In 1987, Daoud obtained his graduate diploma, and later in 1988 the Magister Artium from the Vienna Music Academy.

At the end of 1988 Rageh Daoud returned to Egypt to resume his teaching career at the Cairo Conservatoire, where he is now professor at the Dept. of Composition and Conducting. He wrote several orchestral, chamber compositions and piano works.

Rageh Daoud has his active role in the musical life in Egypt and abroad, where works of his were performed in Cairo, Alexandria, Vienna, Italy Germany, Paris, Czech, London, Spain, Canada, Hungary and Poland.

He was awarded several prizes in cinema Festivals especially the National Festival for feature films in Cairo, the Alexandria film festival, the critic's association, etc. for his film music for feature and documentary films. He has also founded and conducted the Chamber Orchestra of the Hanager Center of the Ministry of Culture, to help promoting contemporary Egyptian music.

1997 he got the State Encouragement in musical composition from Ministry of Culture for his Work Two Portrait for String Orchestra. That same year he was a member of the jury of the "Concorso Pianistico Internazionale – Premio F. Durante" in Napoli, Italy. In 1997 he was also invited by the S.I.M.S. in Secelia to join the "Conferenza Musicale Mediterranea" to play his work Pasacaglia for lute, organ and strings in Palermo, Messina and Catania. The "Marschner Festival Hinterzarten" invited him to play and conduct some of his works.

Since 2001, he is chairman of the Committee for Music, Opera, and Ballet in the Supreme Council of Culture.

In 2017, he was credited for creating the music for the new national anthem of Mauritania.

== Compositions ==
Rageh Daoud

A- List of works

1- Egyptian Glimpse for Orchestra (1978)

2- Sonata for Piano - Dedicated to Gamal Abdel Rahim (1978)

3- Sonata for Piano - Dedicated to Gamal Abdel Rahim (1978)

4- Four Pieces for String Orchestra (1985)

5- Fugue for String Quartet (1985)

6- Portrait No 1 for String Orchestra (1986)

7- Portrait No 2 for String Orchestra (1987)

8- Piano Trio, Dedicated to Mauna Ghoneim (1987)

9- Nocturne for Cello & Piano No 1, Dedicated to Hassan Soliman (1990)

10- Requiem for Choir and Orchestra (1990)

11- Rhapsody for Flute, Violin and Orchestra (1992)

12- Passacaglia for Lute, Organ and String Orchestra (1993)

13- Two Dances for Flute, French Horn, Piano and Strings (1994)

14- Two Dances for Flute and Piano (1994)

15- "Taqassim" for Alto Flute and String Orchestra (1994)

16- Esprit Espagnole for Flute or Violin & Piano Dedicated to Prof Irakli Beridze (1997)

17- Wandering for Marimba, Nay and String Orchestra (1998)

18- Musical Moment for Orchestra (2001)

19- Ascent for String Orchestra Dedicated to the Memory of Osama Elkholy (2002)

20- Ascent for Oud, Violin & Cello - Dedicated to Walter Grimmer (2002)

21- Dialogue for Violin and Orchestra (2003) 22- Poetic Moment No 1 for Violin, Clarinet and String Quintet (2004)

23- Poetic Moment No 2 for Violin or Clarinet and String Quintet (2004)

24- Night Meditation for String Orchestra (2004)

25- Nour Oyouni for String Orchestra (2004)

26- Fantasy for cello Solo Dedicated to Walter Grimmer (2005)

27- Kessam we Arzak Musical Operetta (2006)

28- Mermaid Symphonic Poem (2007)

29- Adagio for String Orchestra (2007)

30- Hob El Watan (Umm Kolthoum) Egyptian Hymn (2007)

31- Nocturne No 2 for Cello or French Horn & Piano No 2 (2008)

32- Music Intuitions For Flute Clarinet, Violin, Viola, Cello, Piano and Percussion (2009)

33- Promenade for Qanon, Bassoon and Strings (2009)

34- Taqassim for Clarinet Solo (2009)

35- Tahrir Square “To the Martyrs of January 25th Revolution” (2011)

36- Le Murmure des Fleurs For Strings – Dedicated to Salah Marie (2011)

B- Music for Feature Films

1- The Vagabonds - Director: Daoud Abdel Sayed, 1985

2- The Search for Sayed - Director: Daoud Abdel Sayed, 1990

3- Kit Kat - Director: Daoud Abdel Sayed, 1991

4- Al-Raii wa al Nesaa “The Shepherd and The Women” - Director: Ali Badrakhan, 1991

5- The Murderess - Director: Inas El Deghedy, 1991

6- Al Sarkha “The Scream” - Director: Mohamed El Nagar, 1992

7- The Scandal - Director: Farouk Rashidy, 1992

8- Al Ghar'ana "The Drowned ” - Director: Mohamed Khan, 1992

9- Land of Dreams - Director: Daoud Abdel Sayed 1993

10- Ahlam Saghira “Small Dreams”- Director: Khaled El Hagar, 1994

11- Zeyaret Al Sayed Al Rais “The Visit of Mr. President” - Director: Mounir Rady, 1994

12- Three on the Road - Director: Mohamed Kalioby, 1994

13- The Stolen Joy - Director: Daoud Abdel Sayed, 1994

14- Al Ragol al Talet “The Third Man” - Director: Ali Badrakhan, 1994

15- El Bahr Beyedhak Leh “Why is the Sea Laughing” - Director: Mohamed Kalioby, 1995

16- Traffic Light - Director: Khairy Beshara, 1995

17- Afaryt El Asfalt “Asphalt Demons” - Director: Osama Fawzy, 1996

18- The Woman and the Cleaver - Director: Said Marzouk, 1996

19-The Captain - Director: Sayed Said, 1997

20- The Hero - Director: Magdi Ahmed Ali, 1998

21- Ikhtefaa Gaafar El Masry “The Disappearance of Gaafar El Masry” - Director: Adel El Assar,1998

22- The Naked - Director: by Inas El Deghedy, 1998

23- Itfarag ya Salam “Waoo! Have a Look” - Director: Mohamed Kalioby, 1998

24-Hassan and Aziza, A State Security Case - Director: Karim Gamal El-Din, 1999

25- Stolen Dreams - Director: Mohamed Kalioby, 1999

26- Land of Fear - Director: Daoud Abdel Sayed, 1999

27- Forbidden Words - Director: Omar Abdel-Aziz, 2000

28- A Hero from the South - Director: Mohamed Abu Seif 2000

29- A Citizen, a Detective and a Thief - Director: Daoud Abdel Sayed, 2001

30- Diary of a Teenager - Director: Inas El Deghedy, 2001

31- Hafar Al Bahr “The Derrick” - Director: Adel El Assar, 2001

32- Umm Abdel Sayed's Tale - Director: Osama Raouf, 2001

33- Search for Freedom- Director: Inas El Deghedy, 2004

34- Kan Yom Hobak “The day I fell in love with you - Director: Ihab Lamey, 2004

35- Kharif Adam “Adam's Autumn” -Director: Mohamed Kalioby, 2002

36- Keif Alhal “How do you do?”- Director: Muslim Izador, 2006 37- Room 707 - Director: Ihab Rady, 2004

38- El Rayes Omar Harb “The Chief Omar Harb” - Director: Khaled Youssef, 2008

39- Fawzeya's Secret Recipe - Director: Magdi Ahmed Ali, 2008

40- Helm el Omr, “Lifetime Dream” - Director: by Wael Ehsan, 2008

41- Lamh Al Basar “Jiffy” - Director: Youssef Hesham, 2009

42- Crazy for the Princess- Director: Inas El Deghedy, 2009

43- Birds of the Nile - Director: Magdi Ahmed Ali, 2010

44- Messages from the Sea - Director: Daoud Abdel Sayed, 2010

C- Music for Documentary Films

1- Doctors in the City - Director: Ahmed Kassem, 1980

2- Children's Village - Director: Mustafa Moharam, 1981

3- Mohamed Bayoumi - Director: Mohamed Kalioby, 1990

4- Contemporary Egyptian Artist Hassan Fouad - Director: Salah El Tohamy, 1991

5- Al Rayes Gaber’s Boat - Director: Ali Al Ghasouly, 1992

6- Ali Mubarak - Director: Magdi Abdel Rahman, 1993

7- Alexandria Greco-Roman Museum “Mathaf el Iskandariyyah” - Director: Asmaa El Bakry, 1993

8 - Qasr Al Nil Street - Director: Fouad El Tohamy, 1993

9- Earthquake - Director: Fouad El Tohamy, 1993

10- Islamic Civilization - Atef El Bakry, 1994

11- The Mosque - Director: Ali Al Ghasouly, 1995

12- The Seven Days - Director: Magdi Ahmed Ali, 1995

13- Adam Henein - Director: Hisham El Shafei, 1996

14- Prospects 1996 - Director: Salah Marei, 1997

15- Umm Kulthoum - (Computer Graphics), 2001

16- Lighthouse - Director: Mohsen Mohi, 2001

17- Monastery of St. Catherine - Director: Ramses Marzouk, 2007

18- Naguib El Rihani - Director: Mohamed Kalioby, 2008

D- Theater Music

1- Priest’s Trial - Director: Nour El-Sherif, 1994

2 - Tomorrow, Next Summer - Director: Abdul Aziz Makhyoun, 1995

3 - Salome - Director: Hanaa Abdel Fattah, 1999

4- King Lear - Director: Ahmed Abdel Halim, 2001

5- Chess Revolution - Director: Nasser Abdel Moneim, 2004

E- Music for T.V. Drama

1- A Taste of Days - Director: Hassan Bashir, 1992

2- Kalila and Dimna (Songs for Children), Written in partnership with Mauna Ghoneim, - Director: Alfred Michael, 1992

3- Ladies of Garden City "Part I and II" - Director: Mohammad Saqr, 1997 to 1998 4- Stray Son - Director: Mohamed Kalioby, 1999

5- Warriors - Director: Essam El Shamaa, 2000

6-The Vicinity of Accusation - Director: Mohamed Helmy, 2000

7- Fate - Director: Khaled Bahgat, 2000

8- A Man in the Time of Globalization "Part 1" - Director: Essam El Shamaa, 2002

9- The Flood - Director: Mohamed Kalioby, 2004

10- Weapons of Mass Destruction - Director: Essam El Shamaa, 2006

11- Victory of Heaven - Director: Ahmed Fahmy, 2006

== See also ==
- List of Egyptian composers
