= Abu Bakr Khairat =

Egyptian composer (1910–1963)

- Born: April 10, 1910; Cairo
- Died: October 25, 1963 (aged 53)
- Occupations: Composer; Pianist; Architect

Abu Bakr Khairat (10 April 1910 – 25 October 1963) (Arabic: أبو بكر خيرت); also spelled Abu Bakr Khayrat) was an Egyptian composer of classical music, part of that nation's first generation of such composers.

An architect by profession, Khairat studied music since childhood, and studied harmony and composition in Paris privately. He had a successful career in architecture, designing the Academy of Arts complex and the Sayed Darwish Concert Hall.

His compositions are written in a romantic idiom, combining Egyptian traditional elements with Western music. He sometimes drew on melodies by the early 20th-century Egyptian composer Sayed Darwish.

He served as the first dean of the Cairo Conservatoire, from 1959 to 1963.

Khairat's father was Mahmud Khayrat. His nephew is the composer Omar Khairat (عمر خيرت).

== Compositions ==
- Lyric Etudes for Piano
- Piano Concerto in C Minor, op. 10
- Symphony no. 3, Op. 23

== See also ==
- List of Egyptian composers
