= Hasan Rashid =

Egyptian composer

Hasan Ahmad Rashid (Arabic: حسن أحمد رشيد: also spelled Hassan Rasheed; July 10, 1896 – May 25, 1969) was an Egyptian composer and operatic baritone. He was part of Egypt's first generation of classical composers.

== Biography ==
As a youth, Rashid studied violin and singing in Cairo. He went to England in 1914 to pursue studies in agriculture at Durham University. While there, he continued his studies in violin, composition, and singing, occasionally performing in University concerts as a violinist and a baritone. He returned to Cairo in 1918 where he began to compose vocal music to Arabic texts. He was part of that nation's first generation of composers to produce classical music. Rashid's work culminated in his sole opera Masra' Antonio (Antony's Death), which has an Arabic text, based on the first part of Ahmed Shawqi's play Cleopatra's Death. The work was influenced by Italian opera, yet Rashid's melodic invention is not without originality. It is the first opera to be composed by an Egyptian. Parts of the work were produced in 1942, but a full staging was not mounted until 1973 by the Egyptian Opera Troupe at the Cairo Opera House. However, the Egyptian public found it difficult to accept the conventions of Western operatic style, particularly when associated with familiar poetry in Arabic, and Rasheed’s opera had few immediate successors. The opera's overture and the aria Isis, O fount of tenderness are often performed separately.

Rashid was married to the pianist and composer of children's songs Baheega Sidky Rasheed (1899-1987), who is best known for her 1958 collection entitled Egyptian Folk Songs (republished in the United States as Egyptian Folk Songs in Arabic and English. Together, they founded the Egyptian Amateur Music Association in 1942. He died in Cairo, aged 72.

== See also ==
- List of Egyptian composers
