= Cairo Symphony Orchestra =

- Orchestra
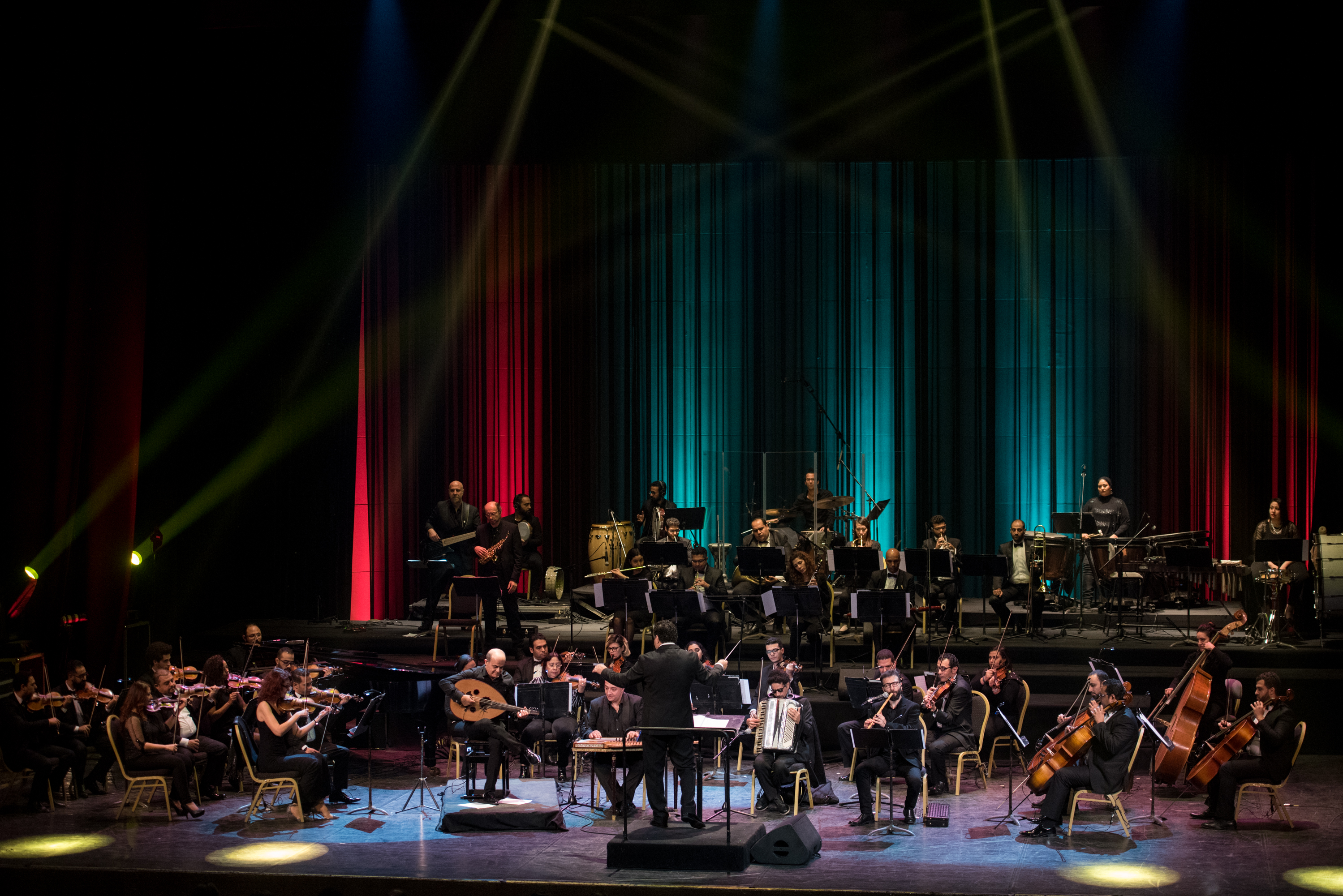
- Native name: أوركسترا القاهرة السيمفونى
- Founded: 1959; 67 years ago
- Location: Cairo, Egypt
- Concert hall: Cairo Opera House
- Music director: Ahmed El Saedi

The Cairo Symphony Orchestra, (Arabic: اوركسترا القاهرة السيمفونى; Orkestra el-Qāhera el-Semfōni), is an orchestra based in Cairo, Egypt. Founded in 1959 by its first music director and conductor, Franz Litschauer. The symphony's current principal conductor is Ahmed El Saedi.

== History ==
The Orchestra was founded in 1959 under its first music director and conductor, Franz Litschauer, and from mid-1959 to 1963 it was conducted by the Yugoslavian Serbs Gika Zdravkovitch (1959–1960) and Dushan Miladinovitch (1960–1963) (Serbian: Живојин Здравковић, Živojin Zdravković; Душан Миладиновић, Dušan Miladinović). Two Egyptian conductors, Ahmed Ebeid and Youssef Elsisi, succeeded Litschauer as conductors of the Cairo Symphony Orchestra.

== Guest conductors and soloists ==
Many international guest conductors such as Charles Munch, Yehudi Menuhin, Alexander Frey, Patrick Fournillier, Carlo Zecchi, Otakar Trhlik, Ole Schmidt, Gennady Rozhdestvensky, Janos Kukla, Alain Pâris, Felix Carrasco, Daniel Barenboim, Nayden Todorov, Sergio Cárdenas, Christophe Mueller, Steven Lloyd, Andreas Spörri, Marcello Mottadelli, Jiří Petrdlík, Nicola Marasco and Jacopo Sipari have led, or have been associated with, the Cairo Symphony Orchestra and Cairo-based symphonic activity. In April 2009, Israeli-Argentinean conductor and pianist Daniel Barenboim played Beethoven's piano sonata no. 8, known as the Pathétique, and conducted the Cairo Symphony Orchestra in a performance of Beethoven's Fifth Symphony.

Among the soloists who have performed with the Cairo Symphony Orchestra are Rudolf Buchbinder, Abdel Rahman El Bacha, Jörg Demus, Ramzi Yassa, André Navarra, Mstislav Rostropovich, Viktoria Postnikova, Stefan Vladar, Christian Altenburger, Cristina Ortiz, Anastasia Chebotareva, Plácido Domingo, Ghada Shaker, Amani Mounir, Mona Rafla, Amr Medhat, Khaled Samir, Imam Moustafa, Jolie Faizy, Reda El Wakil and others.

== See also ==
- Cairo Opera House
- Cairo Conservatoire
- El Sawy Culture Wheel
