= Samha El-Kholy =

Egyptian musicologist (1925–2006)

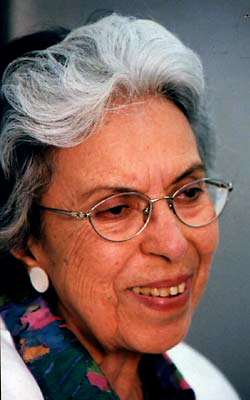
- Born: July 27, 1925
- Died: January 25, 2006 (aged 80)
- Citizenship: Egypt
- Occupations: Musicologist; Composer; Writer

Samha Amin El-Kholy (Arabic: سمحة الخولي; July 27, 1925– January 25, 2006) was a noted Egyptian musicologist. She published widely about the traditional music and contemporary music of Egypt, including several articles about contemporary Egyptian composers in The New Grove Dictionary of Music and Musicians.

She received her doctorate from the University of Edinburgh in Scotland, where she studied with Henry George Farmer. In 1958, she became the first musicologist on the faculty of the newly opened Cairo Conservatoire.

She was married to the Egyptian composer Gamal Abdel-Rahim. From 1972 to 1981, she served as Dean of the Cairo Conservatoire, and from 1982 to 1985 she was President of the Academy of Arts University in Cairo.

She also organized an orchestra for the blind and hosted a television program about music. She organized many concerts and recordings of the works of Egyptian composers.

Her notable students include Mohamed Abdelwahab Abdelfattah.

== Books ==
- El-Kholy, Samha. Al-qawmiyya fī mūsīqā al-qarn al-‘ishrīn’ (Nationalism in 20th-century music) (1992). Kuwait: World of Knowledge.
- El-Kholy, Samha. The Function of Music in Islamic Culture. In the Period Up to 1100 A.D. (1984). Cairo: General Egyptian Book Organization.
- El-Kholy, Samha. The Tradition of Improvisation in Arab Music.
- El-Kholy, Samha, and John O. Robison, eds. (1993). Festschrift for Gamal Abdel-Rahim. The Occasional Paper Series, v. 2, no. 2. Cairo: The Binational Fulbright Commission in Egypt.
