= Yusef Greiss =

Egyptian composer (1899–1961)

- Born: December 13, 1899; Cairo, Egypt
- Died: April 7, 1961 (aged 61); Venice, Italy
- Occupation: Composer

Yusef Greiss (Arabic: يوسف جريس; (December 13, 1899 – April 7, 1961) was an Egyptian composer of classical music, part of that nation's first generation of such composers.

Greiss was of Coptic heritage. He composed orchestral works and chamber music. His patriotic work for orchestra entitled Masr (1932) is considered the first orchestral piece composed by an Egyptian.

As of 2008, the Egyptian musicologist Haig Avakian is editing and preparing Greiss's complete works for publication.

== Performance ==
Solo violin and piano compositions are major parts in Greise's compositions.

He wrote 23 solo piano compositions, 14 solo violin three solo flute, six lyrical compositions with piano, and 10 orchestra compositions.

== Works ==
First: Solo piano compositions

- The Sudanese, 1932
- Nile Boatman, 1932
- La Galerien, 1932
- Good Luck, 1932
- A Boat Burns, 1932
- How Are You, 1932
- Truth, 1932
- Little Palestinian, 1932
- Happiness, 1932
- A Night in the Boat, 1945

Second: Solo violin compositions

- The Bedouin No. 1931 of 1932
- The Egyptian Village, No. 22 of 1932
- Dance of the Palm Valley
- Souvenir, No. 25 of 1932.
- Son of the Valley, 1943
- Bedouin Singing, 1944
- Company of the Nile, 1944
- Desert Songs, 1944
- Sphinx and Violin, 1947
- Daughter of Pyramids, 1961

Third: Violin and piano compositions

- We Dance, 1928
- Forest, 1929
- On Bank of the Nile, 1931
- The Carrier of Water, 1931
- Greetings to Vienna, 1931
- Dance of Palm Trees, 1932
- In the Desert, 1932
- Murrmering Scarabee, 1944
- Romance, 1945
- The Nile Sings, 1950

Fourth: Solo flute compositions

- Echo of the Desert, 1944
- Echo of the Valley, 1944
- Echo of the Nile, 1944

Fifth : Solo cello compositions

- The Man Peasant, 1922

Sixth : Cello and piano compositions

- The Woman Peasant, 1923

Seventh : Lyrical compositions with piano

- Song of the Valley, 1943.
- Boat of Fate, 1944
- Dance of the Nile, 1944
- Song of the Shepherd, 1944
- The Nile's Song and Call, 1944
- Dance of the Village, 1944

Eighth : Orchestral compositions

- Egypt, Symphony, 1932
- The Carrier of Water, 1932
- Toward Desert Monastery, Symphony, 1934
- The Nile and Rose, Symphony, 1943
- Pharos’ Pyramids, Symphony, 1960

All of his composition have been published digitally by Haig Avakian.

On the Day of Art in 1981, the state honored and listed him in the Record of Immortals in the Arts Academy.

== See also ==
- List of Egyptian composers
