= Gamal Abdel-Rahim =

Egyptian composer, educator, pianist

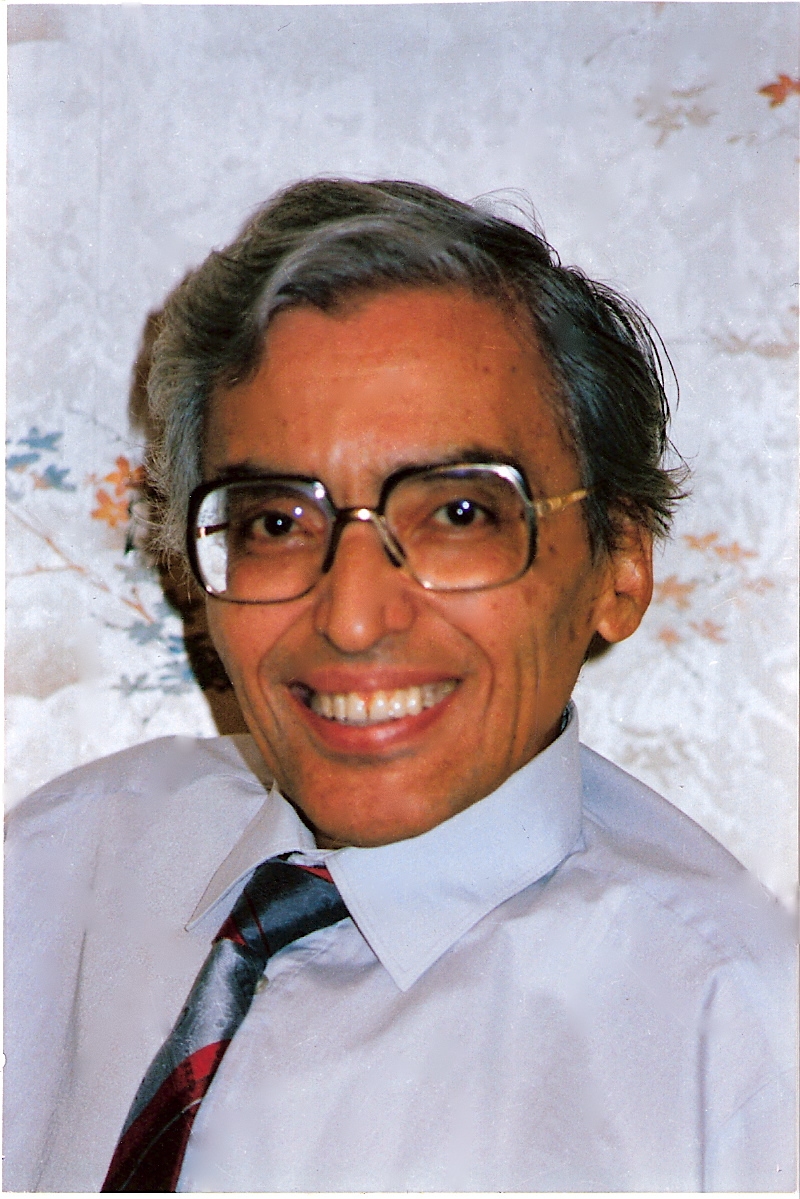
- Born: November 25, 1924; Cairo
- Died: November 23, 1988 (aged 63)
- Occupations: Composer; Teacher; Pianist

Gamal Abdel-Rahim (Arabic: جمال عبد الرحيم Gamāl ‘Abd er-Raheem) (November 25, 1924 – November 23, 1988) was a distinguished Egyptian classical music composer and composition professor.

== Life and career ==
Abdel-Rahim was born in Cairo to a musical father, and began playing the piano at an early age. His early musical studies were supported by the Music Society of the Faculty of Arts of Cairo University (then called Fuad I University), graduating with a degree in history. In 1950 he began university studies in musicology at the Musikhochschule of Heidelberg in West Germany, deciding on a career as a composer. From 1952 to 1957 he studied composition with Harald Genzmer (a pupil of Paul Hindemith) at the Hochschule für Musik Freiburg.

In 1959, Abdel-Rahim was appointed to teach theory and harmony at the newly opened Cairo Conservatory of Music. He was later appointed head of the composition department there (the first of its kind in the Arab world), which he founded in 1971. Abdel-Rahim was quite influential among Egyptian composers of the next generation, as the majority of them studied with him during his time at the Cairo Conservatory.

Abdel-Rahim's style fuses traditional Egyptian musical elements with contemporary European elements, focusing on Egyptian materials in his later works more than in his earlier works. He composed many works for orchestra, chorus, and chamber ensembles, as well as songs and music for film, theater, and ballet. He was awarded the State Prize for Composition, as well as the Order of Arts, from the Egyptian government.

Abdel-Rahim was married to Samha El-Kholy (1925–2006), a noted Egyptian musicologist and former president of the Academy of Arts in Cairo. Abdel-Rahim died in Frankfurt, Germany.

His notable students include Ahmed El-Saedi, Rageh Daoud, Mona Ghoneim, Khaled Shokry, Sherif Mohie El Din, Nader Abbasy, Ali Osman, and Mohamed Abdelwahab Abdelfattah.

== See also ==
- List of Egyptian composers
