= Cairo Opera House =

Opera house and performing arts centre in Cairo, Egypt

Coordinates: 30.04245°N 31.22353°E

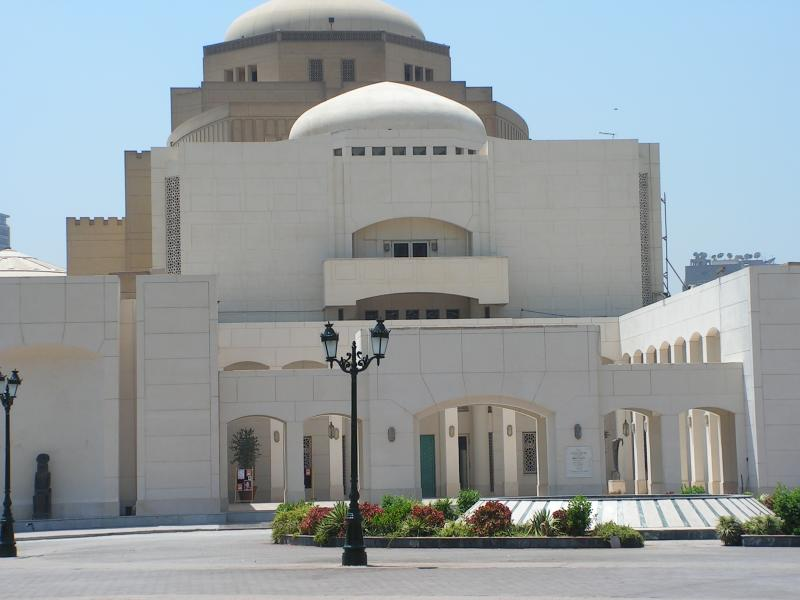
- Interactive map of Cairo Opera House
- Location: Cairo, Egypt
- Capacity: 1,200 people
- Type: Opera house

Construction
- Opened: 1 November 1869 (as Egyptian Royal Opera House)
- Reopened: 10 October 1988

Website
- www.cairoopera.org

The Cairo Opera House (Arabic: دار الأوبرا المصرية, Dār el-Opera el-Masreyya; literally "Egyptian Opera House"), part of Cairo's National Cultural Centre, is the main performing arts venue in the Egyptian capital. Home to most of Egypt's finest musical groups, it is located on the southern portion of Gezira Island in the Nile River, in the Zamalek district near downtown Cairo.

== History ==
The opera house was inaugurated on 10 October 1988. The funds for the complex were a gift from the nation of Japan to Egypt as a result of President Hosni Mubarak's visit to Japan in April 1983. Construction began in May 1985 and lasted for three years.

In October 1988, President Mubarak and Prince Tomohito of Mikasa, the younger brother of the Japanese Emperor, inaugurated the National Cultural Centre Cairo Opera House. It was the first time for Japan to stage a Kabuki show, a traditional popular drama with singing and dancing, in Africa or the Arab World.

In recognition of the Cairo Opera House, the London Royal Philharmonic Orchestra chose it as a venue for their first performance in the Middle East and Africa in January 2007. The Arabic Oud House was created in its premises before moving to a building in the old town.

=== Khedivial Opera House ===
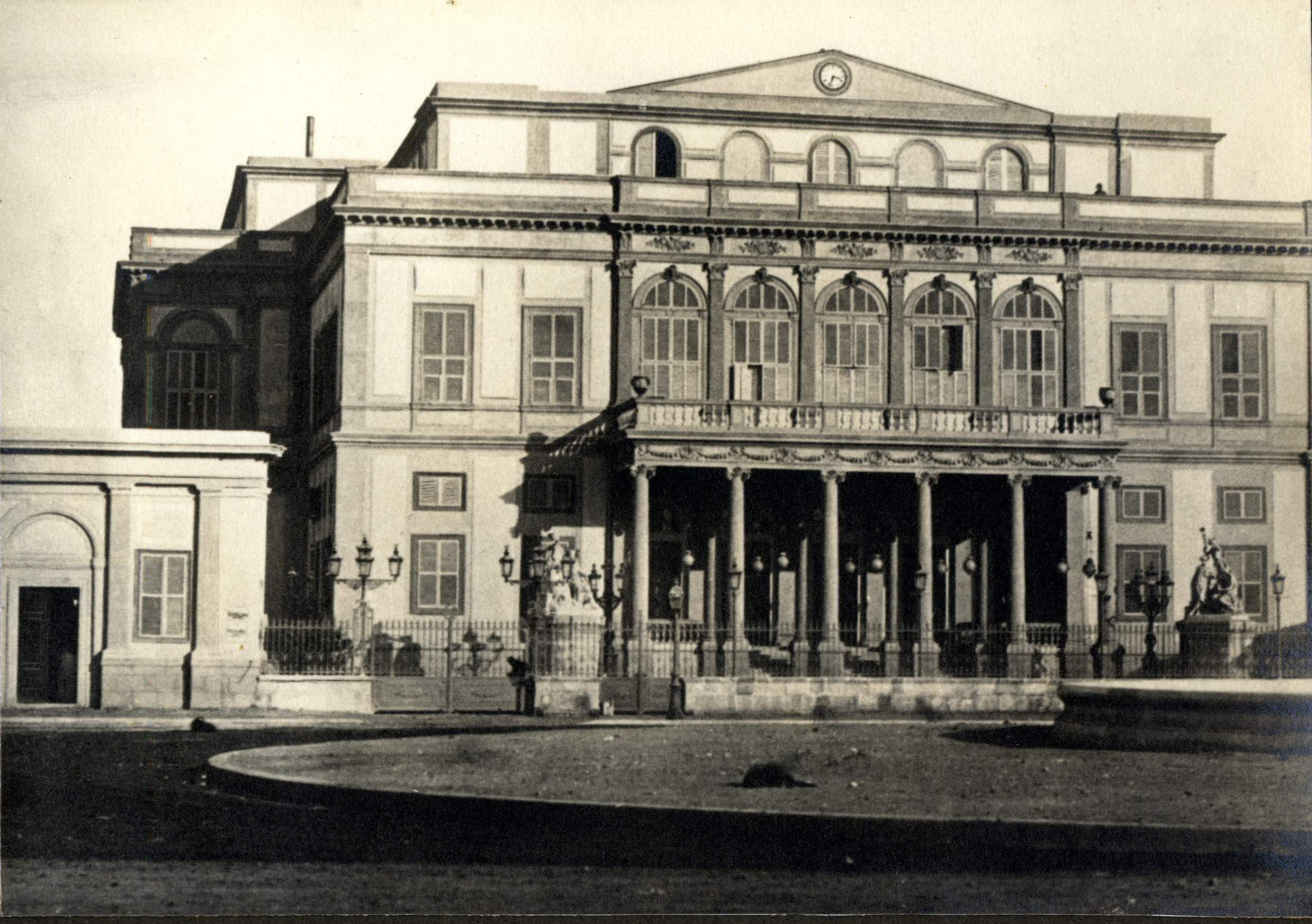
The Khedivial Opera House, in 1869.

In 1869, Khedive Ismail gave instructions to build an opera house to celebrate the opening of the Suez Canal. It was called Khedivial (Royal) Opera House and was meant as a lasting and outstanding symbol of the arts of drama and music. Designed by Italian architects Avoscani and Rossi, the opera house was completed in six months, in the center of Cairo near the Azbakeya district.

The Khedive commissioned a performance which would reflect the ancient Egyptian history. French archaeologist Auguste Mariette, in the Khedive's service, wrote a plot which eventually served the respected Italian librettist Antonio Ghislanzoni as a basis for his libretto. Giuseppe Verdi was appointed to compose the music. The result was the famous opera, Aida, with its heroic quality, powerful dramatic scenes and its passionate music.

Because of delays caused by the Franco-Prussian war, the sets and costumes for the premiere of Aida could not be transported from Paris in time, and in 1869 the Opera House opened instead with Verdi's Rigoletto, one of Verdi's earlier masterpieces. Aida would receive its world premiere in Cairo in 1871. Contrary to general belief, Aida was not commissioned for the inauguration of the Suez Canal.

The Khedivial Opera House was the first on the African continent to perform world famous operas and symphonic masterpieces.

A little over a century later, in the early morning of 28 October 1971, the great Khedivial Royal Opera House was completely destroyed by a fire.

== Venues and facilities ==
The Cairo Opera Complex consists of seven theaters, a music library, an art gallery and a museum.

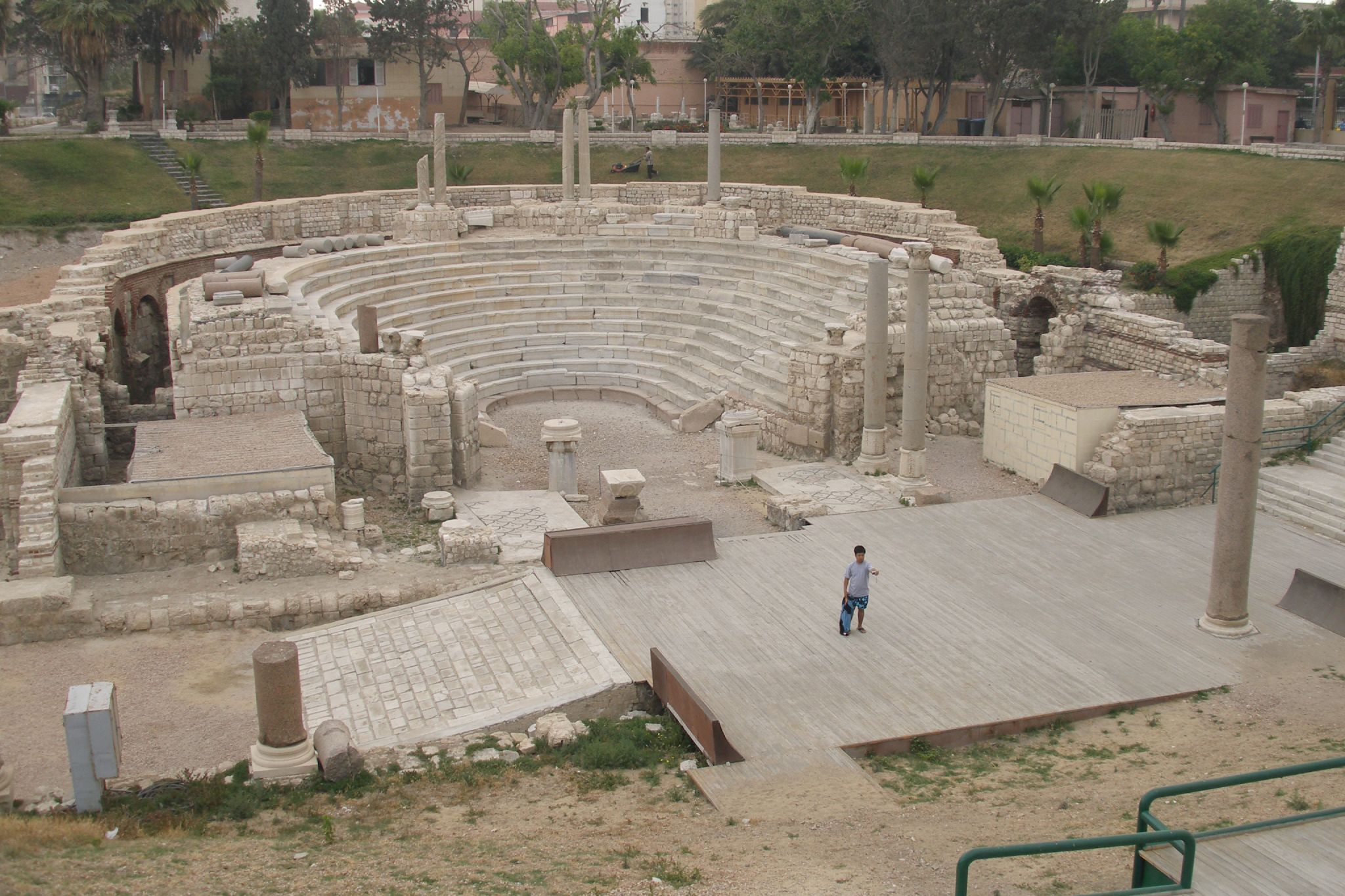
The Roman theatre, Alexandria district.

- The Main Hall seats 1,200 people and has four levels, including orchestra seating, three tiers and a presidential box. It is used for operas and orchestra and ballet performances.
- The Small Hall seats up to 500 people on a single floor, is used for chamber music and recitals and can double as a very large reception hall for important events.
- The Open-Air Theatre is an acoustically designed square-shaped stage used for outdoor performances, and seats 600 people.
- El Gomhouria Theatre is an exquisite theater situated near Abdeen Royal Palace. It is under the administration of the Cairo Opera House.
- The Arab Music Institute has state-of-the-art technology and is well-suited to stage authentic Arab music performances.
- The Alexandria Opera House or Sayed Darwish Theatre
- The Roman theatre, Alexandria which was discovered in 1963, seats up to 800. It features white marble, green marble, red granite and mosaic, arches and stone.

== Resident companies ==
- Cairo Symphony Orchestra
- Cairo Opera Company
- Cairo Opera Ballet Company
- National Arab Music Ensemble
- Cairo Opera Orchestra
- Cairo Modern Dance Theater
- Heritage Ensemble for Arab Music
- Religious Song Ensemble
- Cairo Opera Choir
- Cairo Opera Children's Choir

== See also ==
- Egyptian Opera House
- Cairo Conservatoire
- List of concert halls
- Sherif Sonbol - (Cairo Opera House official photographer)
