= Cairo Conservatoire =

Music conservatory in Egypt

Coordinates: 30.0021506°N 31.1961194°E

The Cairo Conservatoire
- Type: Public music school
- Established: 1959
- Academic affiliations: Academy of Arts
- Location: Cairo, Egypt
- Campus: Urban

The Cairo Conservatoire (Egyptian Arabic: معهد الكونسرفتوار; transliteration: Ma'had el-Konservatwar; full name: "المعهد العالي للموسيقى "الكونســرفاتوار) is the primary music conservatory in Egypt. Founded in 1959, the Cairo Conservatoire is part of Egypt's Academy of Arts.

== Overview ==
It was established in 1959 and is located in the same building complex as the Cinema Institute and the Higher Institute for Theatrical Arts, Haram, Giza, Greater Cairo, while the Cairo Symphony Orchestra is based at Cairo Opera House in Cairo.

Along with six other educational institutions, the Cairo Conservatoire is part of Egypt's Academy of Arts (Akādīmīya al-Finūn), a large complex.

The current dean is dr.Hanan Aboulmagd.

The Cairo Conservatoire was preceded by, but should not be confused with, several other smaller Cairo institutions with similar names, such as the conservatoires of Ignaz Tiegerman and Joseph Szulc.

They teach piano, violin, and all other instruments.

== Notable faculty ==
- Samha El-Kholy
- Nabila Erian
- Mohamed Abdelwahab Abdelfattah

== Alumni ==
- Mona Ghoneim (composer)
- Ali Osman
- Ahmed Badr
- Nabila Erian (singer)
- Ramzi Yassa (pianist)
- Mohamed Abdelwahab Abdelfattah
- Mahmoud Saleh (cellist)
- Ines Abdel-Dayem (flute)
