= List of Cairo Higher Institute of Cinema people =

This is a list of notable people affiliated with the Higher Institute of Cinema, a film school in Giza, Egypt.

== Notable alumni ==
Not all listed alumni graduated from the university, and are so noted if the information is known.

=== Directors ===
- Adel Awad
- Ahmed El-Nahass
- Ahmed Nader Galal
- Ali Badrakhan, director and screenwriter
- Amir Ramses
- Arab Loutfi, director and screenwriter
- Atef El Tayeb
- Ateyyat El Abnoudy, director and actress
- Bassam Al-Thawadi
- Eltayeb Mahdi
- Fawzi Saleh
- Hicham Abou al-Nasr
- Imane Mesbahi, director and actress
- Inas al-Deghidi
- Kamla Abou Zikri
- Kawthar Younis
- Khairy Beshara
- Magdy Ahmed Ali, director, actor, and screenwriter
- Marwan Hamed
- Mohamed Abou Seif
- Mohamed Kamal al-Kalioubi
- Nabiha Lotfy, director and actress
- Nader Galal
- Nadia Salem
- Omar El Zohairy
- Radwane al-Kachef
- Said Hamed
- Sameh Abdulaziz
- Samir Seif, director and screenwriter
- Sandra Nashaat
- Sara Gadalla Gubara
- Sherif Arafa, director, screenwriter, and producer
- Sherif El Bendary, director and writer
- Yousry Nasrallah

=== Actors ===
- Ahmed Mekky, actor and director
- Karim Abdel Aziz, actor and director
- Ma'ali Zayed
- Mahmoud el-Gendy
- Mohamed Lotfy
- Mustafa Fahmy
- Zaki Fatin Abdel Wahab, actor and director

=== Writers ===
- Ahmed Mourad
- Mohsen Zayed
- Youssef Maaty

=== Cinematographers ===
- Abya Farid
- Sulafa Jadallah

== Faculty ==
- Ahmed Kamel Morsi, head of direction
- Helmy Halim
- Kamal Abou-El-Ela
- Mohammed Karim, first dean of the institute
- Mona Al Sabban, professor and alumna
