= Mohamed Hakki =

Egyptian journalist, political analyst and diplomat

Mohammed Ibrahim Hakki (Arabic محمد إبراهيم حقي) (7 April 1933, Cairo – 24 October 2015, Virginia) was an Egyptian journalist, public relations manager and diplomat, and was considered a leading writer and political analyst, and a decades-long witness and scholar of Egyptian-American relations. In a career that spanned over five decades, Hakki was chief editor and bureau chief for a number of Egyptian and Arab newspapers, and held positions at the World Bank, the Egyptian government, and was late president Anwar Sadat's spokesman.

== Journalism ==
Hakki started his career at Egypt's leading and state-owned newspaper, Al-Ahram in 1959, where he became Chief Foreign Editor by the 1960s and "one of its star journalists... during its golden era." His position meant that he not only covered the world, but travelled it, visiting countries in Europe, Asia, the former Soviet Union, and nearly 25 African countries, interviewing many decision makers including German Chancellor Willy Brandt in 1969.

In the early 1970s, Hakki left journalism for a relatively brief stint in public relations and diplomacy, returning to writing in the early 1980s. In 1982 he was offered a fellowship at the Woodrow Wilson Center to write a book on Egyptian-American relations under the working title The Domestic Determinants of Egypt's Foreign Policy.

Through the 1980s and 90s Hakki became Washington Bureau Chief for the Kuwaiti Al-Anba’ and then the Saudi Arabian Okaz newspapers. These positions meant that he was regularly invited to comment on Arab-American issues, most notably during the Gulf War, and on discrimination against the Arab-American community in the United States.

Despite retiring from full-time work in the late 1990s, Hakki remained a regular columnist on Egyptian-American and Arab-American issues, especially on the aftermath of the 9/11 attacks, and the 2003 invasion of Iraq, writing regularly for his first port of call, Al-Ahram, and its English offshoot, Al-Ahram Weekly, throughout the 1990s and 2000s, as well as being a guest columnist in a number of international media outlets – see Writings below.

== Public relations and diplomacy ==
In 1972, Hakki moved to Washington D.C. joining the World Bank as Information and Public Affairs Officer.

However, in 1975 president Anwar Sadat tasked him with establishing the Egyptian Embassy in Washington D.C.’s Media and Information Office, becoming a key press liaison for major developments that took place in Egyptian-American relations over the ensuing six years. Hakki then served as director of Cairo's State Information Service in 1980, also becoming Sadat's spokesperson, replacing Safwat al-Sharif. This position was apparently given to Hakki with the promise of holding a cabinet position in the near future – possibly to replace Minister of Information and Presidential Affairs Mansour Hassan who was eventually removed/resigned in September 1981. That possibility was dashed with the assassination of Sadat in October of that year, and the end of his tenure as chief of SIS within a year of president Hosni Mubarak coming to power.

== Selected writing ==
=== Al-Ahram (Arabic) ===
- 12 December 1969 "أول حديث لمستشار ألمانيا الغربية بعد الاعتراف بألمانيا الشرقية"
- 19 April 1998 "السياسه الامريكيه والشرق الاوسط ما اشبه الليله بالبارحه"

=== Al-Ahram Weekly ===
- War of the worlds, 11 – 17 October 2001.
- The war inside America, 11 – 17 October 2001.
- America's 'disappeared', 22 – 28 November 2001.
- Peace now, 29 Nov. – 5 Dec. 2001.
- 'What tiger?', 24 – 30 January 2002.
- No more excuses, 31 Jan. – 6 Feb. 2002.
- America's vanishing promise, 14 – 20 February 2002.
- 'It's what I have to do', (Interview with Lyndon LaRouche), 18 – 24 April 2002.
- Wolfowitz's America, 27 Feb. – 5 March 2003.
- How to win the war, and lose the peace, 27 March – 2 April 2003
- Defeat after occupation?, 3 – 9 April 2003

=== Other publications ===
- “We Want Peace- and Our Land Back”, Washington Star News, 21 October 1973
- "Egypt under Mubarak", Middle East Institute, 1983
- "Qaddafi Doesn't Represent All Arabs", Washington Report on Middle East Affairs, May 19, 1986, Page 12
- "شاهد جديد من قلب احداث 67 دين راسك وزير خارجيه امريكا فى 67 يكتب لاول مره ذكرياته", Octobar, 5 August 1990 (Arabic)
- 'Disappeared’ in the USA, Index on Censorship, 31:1 (2002), 22–23, DOI: 10.1080/03064220208537007
- "Wolfowitz at the World Bank", Counterpunch, March 3, 2006.
- "Outside View: Leading by Hubris!", UPI, September 24, 2006.
