= Walid Ebeid =

Egyptian contemporary artist

Walid Ebeid (born 1970) is a contemporary Egyptian artist.

== Biography ==
Ebeid was born in 1970 in Cairo, Egypt, and spent part of his childhood in Yemen. Encouraged by his father, he began drawing at a young age. His artistic skills were recognized by his teachers, who also encouraged him to pursue an artistic education. In 1992, he graduated with a Bachelor of Fine Arts from Helwan University.

== Career ==
Ebeid been a part of several solo and group exhibitions. Ebeid's work is characterized by his style, realistic expressionism. He focuses on social issues, particularly women's rights. He works primarily with oil paint.

In 1994, Ebeid was invited by the Egyptian Ministry of Culture to be a part of an exhibit in the Egyptian Hall of Diplomats. Farouk Hosny, former Egyptian Minister of Culture helped Ebeid with his first solo exhibition. Ebeid has received several awards, including the Cleopatra Art Prize and scholarships from the Egyptian Ministry of Culture. His work continues to resonate with audiences worldwide, offering a critique of contemporary societal issues, especially issues prevalent in Egypt.

== Exhibitions ==
Walid Ebeid has held several solo and group exhibitions in Egypt, showcasing his figurative realism and socially reflective themes. Notable exhibitions include:

- "People You May Know" – A solo exhibition held in February 2019 at Art Talks Gallery in Cairo. The exhibition addressed social taboos, particularly concerning gender, and explored themes of oppression and identity.
- "Emotive Journey" – A group exhibition at Azad Art Gallery in Cairo featuring Ebeid's work alongside other Middle Eastern artists, focusing on the emotional depth of contemporary figurative painting.
- Multinational Group Exhibition – Participated in a 2023 group exhibition at Picasso Art Gallery, Cairo, exhibiting works that emphasized personal and cultural identity.
