= Israeli government response to the October 7 attacks =

Government and military actions

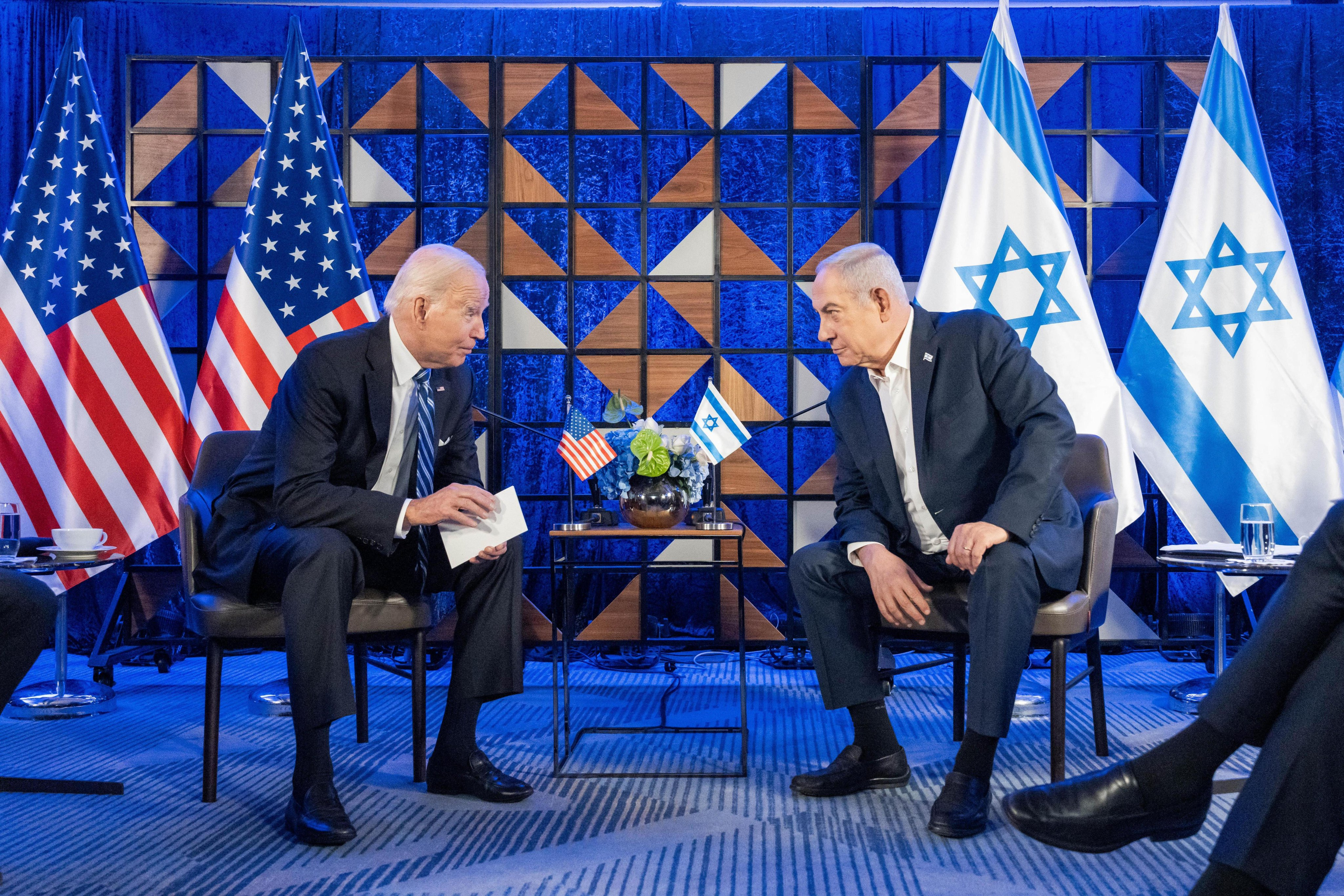
President Joe Biden with Prime Minister Benjamin Netanyahu

The Israeli government's response to the October 7 attacks has multiple aspects, including a military response leading to the Israeli invasion of the Gaza Strip. In October, the Knesset approved a war cabinet in Israel, adding National Unity ministers and altering the government; Benjamin Netanyahu and Benny Gantz froze non-war legislation, establishing a war cabinet with military authority.

The IDF's subsequent large-scale bombing and invasion of Gaza led to a humanitarian crisis, mass detentions, and famine. Israel's response was criticized as resulting in war crimes, and it was charged with genocide by South Africa in the International Court of Justice. Settler expansions and officials' controversial remarks heightened unrest, leading to protests in Israel. The Knesset's law criminalizing "terrorist materials" consumption drew criticism. The Israeli government's response prompted international protests, arrests, and harassment.

== Background ==
The Israeli government faced criticism after it was revealed intelligence agencies had been aware of an attack plan for over a year. Yair Lapid, a centrist Israeli politician, called the failure of the government and intelligence agencies to prevent the attack an "unpardonable failure". Netanyahu blamed Israel's intelligence chiefs.

Egypt said it warned Israel days before the attack, "an explosion of the situation is coming, and very soon, and it would be big". Israel denied receiving such a warning, but the Egyptian statement was corroborated by Michael McCaul, Chairman of the US House Foreign Relations Committee, who said warnings were made three days before the attack.

Israeli intelligence officials initially stated that they had no warnings or indications of the 7 October attack by Hamas, despite Israel exercising extensive monitoring over Gaza. Furthermore, the United States warned the Israeli government of the possibility of a surprise attack from Hamas a few days before the incident. In July 2023, a member of the Israeli signals intelligence unit alerted her superiors that Hamas was conducting preparations for the assault, saying that "I utterly refute that the scenario is imaginary". An Israeli colonel ignored her concerns. According to the Financial Times, alerts from the signals unit were ignored because they came from lower-ranking soldiers, contradicted the belief that Hamas was contained by Israel's blockade of the Gaza Strip, bombing, and placation via aid, and the belief that Hamas was seeking to avoid a full war.

== 7 October ==
The Israeli military faced criticism for its handling of the initial 7 October attack. According to Haaretz's journalist Josh Breiner, a police source said that a police investigation indicated an IDF helicopter which had fired on Hamas militants "apparently also hit some festival participants" in Re'im music festival. The Israeli police denied the Haaretz report and said they found no evidence of civilian harm resulting from the aerial activities at that location.

A New York Times analysis described the Israeli military response on 7 October as "poorly organized", with soldiers operating without a response plan or training and "making it up as they went along". On 31 December, Eli Cohen told Maariv that the Israeli government bore responsibility for the 7 October attack and an investigation committee was needed to hold those negligent accountable. The Haaretz editorial board further called for an investigation into reported Israeli tank fire at Be'eri on 7 October. Ynet reported soldiers were told to stop militants from returning to Gaza "at all costs", despite fears that many were holding Israeli hostages as they fled.

In response to reports that Israeli soldiers had been instructed to follow the Hannibal Directive, an IDF policy to kill Israeli soldiers before allowing them to be taken hostage, Asa Kasher, the author of the IDF Code of Conduct, called for an investigation, stating "There is absolutely nothing to allow someone to kill an Israeli citizen, in uniform or not". On 6 February 2024, the Israeli military stated it would be opening an investigation into whether Israeli civilians were killed by the Israeli military on 7 October.

A July 2024 Haaretz investigation revealed that the IDF ordered the Hannibal Directive to be used, adding: "Haaretz does not know whether or how many civilians and soldiers were hit due to these procedures, but the cumulative data indicates that many of the kidnapped people were at risk, exposed to Israeli gunfire, even if they were not the target." One of these decisions was made at 7:18 A.M., when an observation post reported someone had been kidnapped at the Erez crossing, close to the IDF's liaison office. "Hannibal at Erez" came the command from divisional headquarters, "dispatch a Zik." The Zik is an unmanned assault drone, and the meaning of this command was clear, Haaretz reported.

A source in the Southern Command of the IDF told Haaretz: "Everyone knew by then that such vehicles could be carrying kidnapped civilians or soldiers...There was no case in which a vehicle carrying kidnapped people was knowingly attacked, but you couldn't really know if there were any such people in a vehicle. I can't say there was a clear instruction, but everyone knew what it meant to not let any vehicles return to Gaza." The same source stated that on 2:00 P.M. a new instruction was given that "was meant to turn the area around the border fence into a killing zone, closing it off toward the west."

Haaretz further reported that at 6:40 P.M. military intelligence believed militants were intending to flee back to Gaza in an organized manner from near Kibbutz Be'eri, Kfar Azza and Kissufim. In response the army launched artillery at the border fence area, very close to some of these communities. Shells were also fired at the Erez border crossing shortly thereafter. The IDF says it is not aware of any civilians being hurt in these bombardments.

Haaretz notes one case in which it is known that civilians were hit, which took place in the house of Pessi Cohen at Kibbutz Be'eri. 14 hostages were in the house as the IDF attacked it, with 13 of them killed.

A September 2024 report by ABC News (Australia) also covered the use of the Hannibal Directive in the initial Israeli response. The report quotes former Israeli officer, Air Force Colonel Nof Erez as saying: "This was a mass Hannibal. It was tons and tons of openings in the fence, and thousands of people in every type of vehicle, some with hostages and some without." ABC News adds that it was not only soldiers but also Israeli civilians who were targeted, citing testimonies from two incidents at Kibbutz Be'eri and Nir Oz.

Six months later the Israeli military released a review exonerating itself, but ABC News notes that it left many at Kibbutz Be'eri unsatisfied and contradicts the testimony from one of the survivors, Yasmin Porat, "who told Israel's Kan radio on October 15 that Hamas gunmen had not threatened the hostages and instead intended to negotiate with police for their safe return to Gaza. She said an Israeli police special unit had started the gun battle by firing upon the house, catching "five or six" kibbutz residents outside in "very, very heavy crossfire". In the interview, she was asked: "So our forces may have shot them?" "Undoubtedly," she replied."

=== Timeline ===
- 06:30: Air raid sirens were activated in southern and central Israel in response to Hamas missiles.
- 07:40: The Israel Defense Forces (IDF) confirmed Hamas militants had entered southern Israel and asked residents of Sderot and other cities to remain indoors.
- 08:15: Sirens were activated in Jerusalem following a rocket barrage that landed on the city's western edge.
- 08:23: Israel declared a state of alert for war, activating its reservists, in response to continued rocket attacks.
- 08:34: Israel announced that it had begun counteroffensive operations against Hamas.
- 10:47: The Israeli Air Force (IAF) began attacking Gaza.
- 11:35: Prime Minister Benjamin Netanyahu made his first statement, declaring that Israel was at war.
- 12:21: The IDF began operations to relieve cities in southern Israel as the number of rockets launched from Gaza increased to over 1,200.
- 18:00: The Israeli security cabinet said on 8 October that a state of war had officially begun at this time.

== War cabinet ==
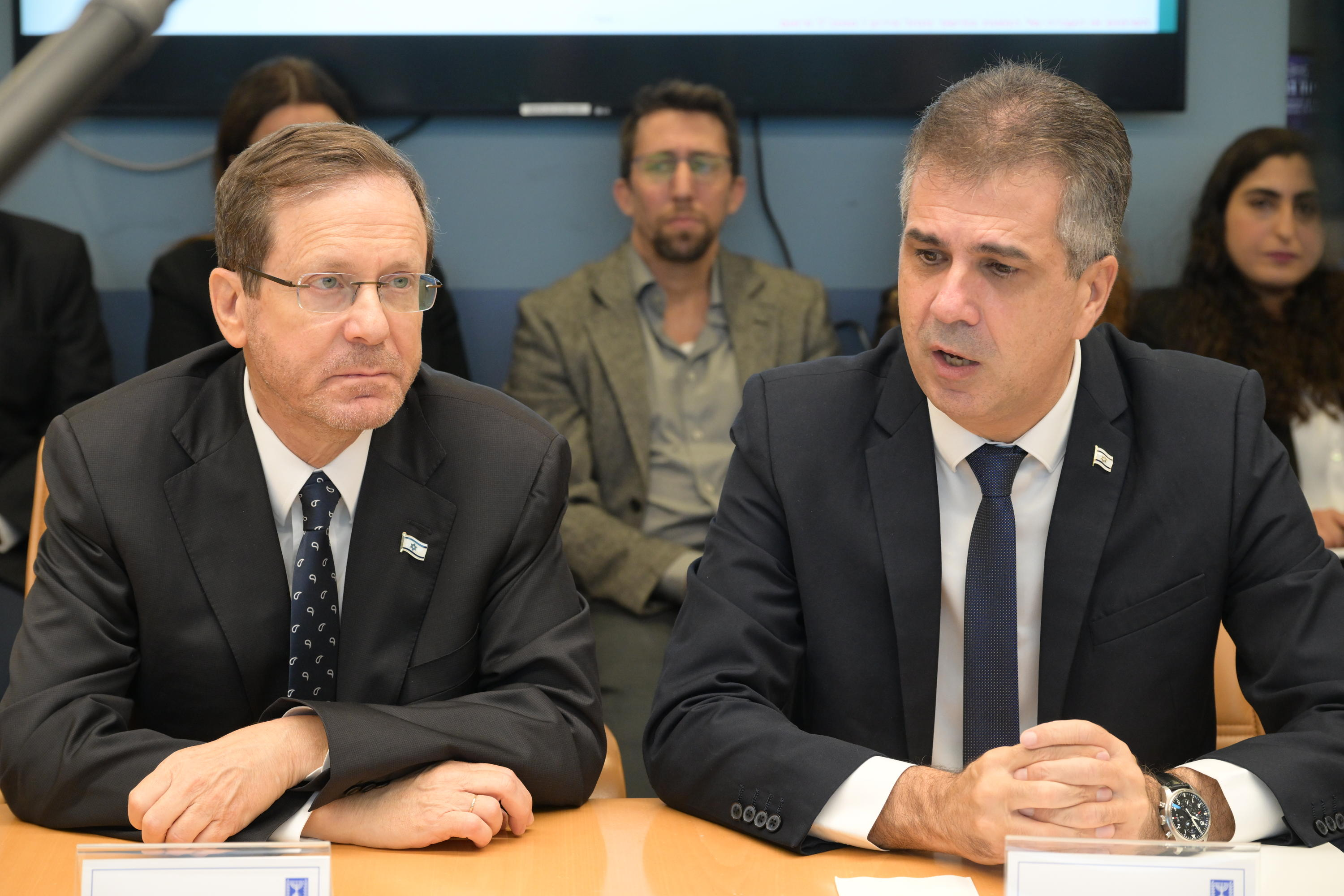
Isaac Herzog with Eli Cohen

The formation of the war cabinet was approved by the Knesset on 12 October. The composition of the preexisting government was modified: MKs voted, 66–4, to approve the addition of five National Unity ministers (Gantz, Gadi Eisenkot, Gideon Sa'ar, Hili Tropper, and Yifat Shasha-Biton) to the government as ministers without portfolio, and unanimously voted to remove the health portfolio from Interior Minister Moshe Arbel and elevate Uriel Buso of the Shas party to the post of health minister.

As part of the deal, Netanyahu and Gantz also agreed to freeze all new non-war, non-emergency legislation, including the highly controversial judicial overhaul legislation, and agreed that the war cabinet would meet at least once every 48 hours. The war cabinet has the authority to "update, as necessary, military and strategic aims for the conflict" but its decisions are subject to approval from the Security Cabinet of Israel.

On 16 October, Netanyahu's Likud party announced that Yisrael Beytenu, led by Avigdor Lieberman, had agreed to join the emergency government. However, later the same day, Lieberman denied reaching an agreement with the government, saying that the offer to join the Security Cabinet was insufficient. Lieberman said that he wanted a seat on the smaller war cabinet instead. He said his party would "continue to support the government's actions that are meant to eliminate Hamas and Hamas leaders" but that he had "no intention of being the 38th minister in the government and be used as a fig leaf."

In January 2024, the war cabinet's budget accounted for increases in military spending by cutting funding initially allocated for the development of Palestinian communities.

== Military response ==
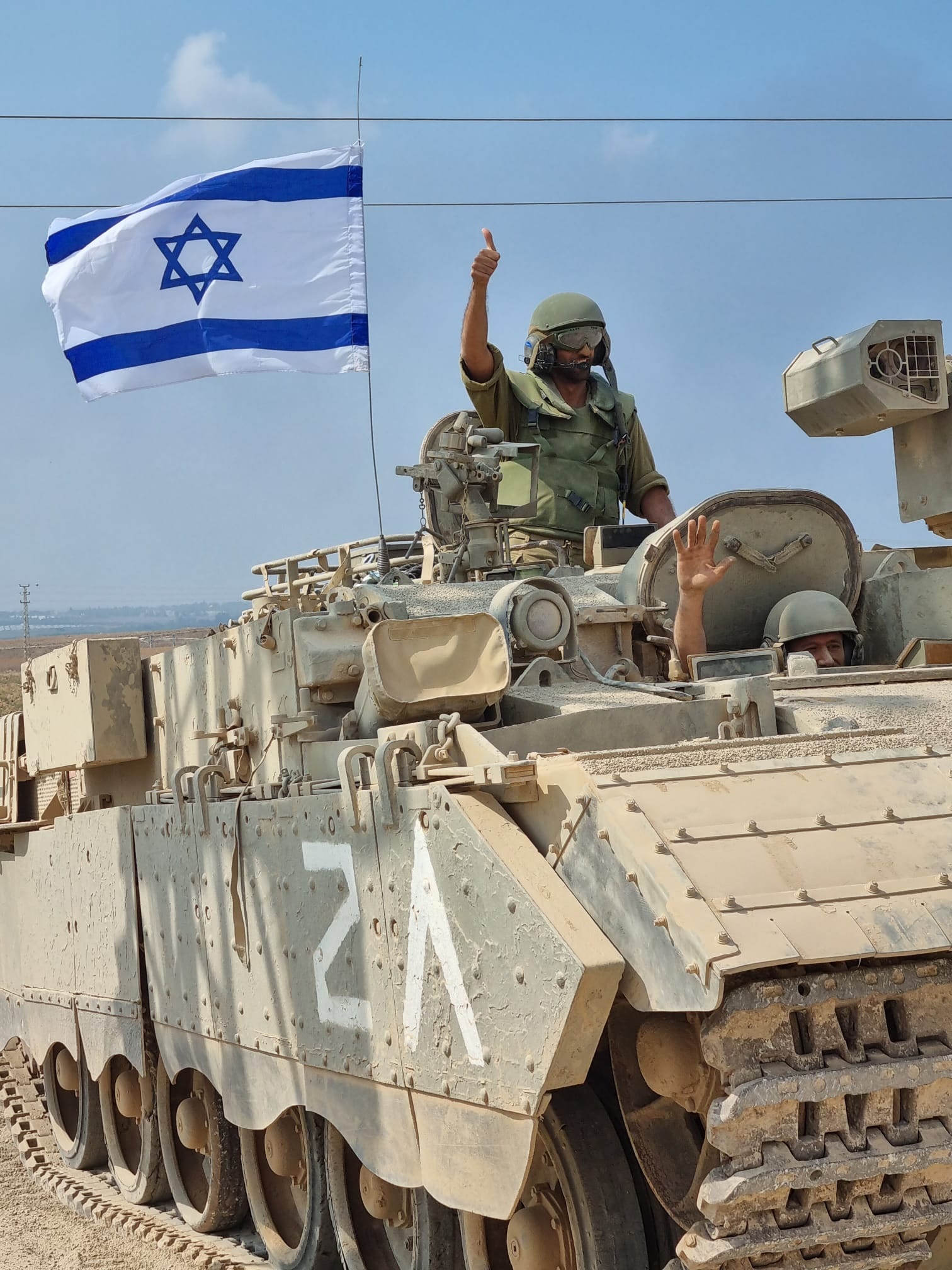
IDF forces before entering into combat in the Gaza Strip

On the evening of 27 October 2023, the Israel Defense Forces (IDF) launched a large-scale invasion inside the Gaza Strip, as part of the Gaza war, with the stated goal of destroying Hamas and overthrowing the organization's governance of the Gaza Strip. At the start of the war, Israel implemented a complete blockade on the Gaza Strip, which has resulted in significant shortages of fuel, food, medication, water, and essential medical supplies. This siege resulted in a 90% drop in electricity availability, impacting hospital power supplies, sewage plants, and shutting down the desalination plants that provide drinking water. Widespread disease outbreaks have spread across Gaza. Heavy bombardment by Israeli airstrikes caused catastrophic damage to Gaza's infrastructure, further deepening the humanitarian crisis.

=== War crimes ===
Numerous charges of war crimes have been levied against the Israeli government for its military actions against civilians. These charges have come from Human Rights Watch, Amnesty International, B'tselem, and human rights groups and experts, including UN rapporteurs.

==== Genocide ====
Israel was accused of committing a genocide against Palestinians in the Gaza Strip. South Africa brought the government of Israel to the International Court of Justice, alleging it was committing acts of genocide in its campaign in Gaza. In response, the government of Israel instructed its embassies to lobby diplomats and politicians around the world to issue statements against South Africa's case.

=== West Bank ===
Following the 7 October attack, Israel intensified its military actions in the West Bank. These included raids in Jenin and attacks on hospitals, paramedics, and medical personnel. In a statement, a Doctors Without Borders representative stated, "Since October, we have witnessed the shooting and killing of a 14-year-old boy in the hospital compound, soldiers firing live rounds and tear gas at the hospital several times, paramedics forced to strip and kneel in the street".

=== Expulsion ===
In the immediate aftermath of the 7 October attack, a document from the Intelligence Ministry, an Israeli government research agency, proposed the forcible expulsion of the population of Gaza into the Sinai desert in neighboring Egypt. Agencies and experts, including the Government of Egypt and the UN special rapporteur on internally displaced persons, have stated they believe Israel's intent is to expel Gazans into Egypt. On 23 December, MK Danny Danon wrote on a social media post he had initiated a plan for the voluntary migration of Palestinians out of Gaza. In a 25 December meeting with Likud party members, PM Netanyahu reportedly said he was ready to support the "voluntary migration" of civilians from Gaza.

Finance Minister Bezalel Smotrich stated Israel should "encourage immigration" from Gaza. On 2 January, Minister of National Security Itamar Ben-Gvir stated, "We will do what is best for the State of Israel: the migration of hundreds of thousands from Gaza". On 7 January, Ben-Gvir stated emigration was the "order of the hour". On 18 January, Ben-Gvir stated, "Voluntary immigration of the residents of Gaza should be encouraged".

=== Gaza occupation ===
Indications of Israeli government plans for a military occupation of Gaza varied in the aftermath of the attack. On 5 December, prime minister Benjamin Netanyahu suggested plans for a direct military occupation of Gaza. On 15 December, Amihai Eliyahu suggested a full military occupation and the reestablishment of settlements. During the conflict, several Israeli cabinet officials suggested that Israel would permanently control Gaza after the war. On 21 January 2024, diaspora minister Amichai Chikli stated that Gaza should be occupied by either Israel or an international power. On 27 January, Israeli finance minister Bezalel Smotrich stated Gaza would be placed under a military administration.

=== Ceasefire ===
Following the 7 October attack, Israeli officials repeatedly stated they were opposed to an end to fighting through a negotiated settlement. On 21 January 2024, PM Netanyahu stated he was opposed to ending the war through a political deal because it would mean "our soldiers have fallen in vain." On 24 January 2024, Israeli ambassador to the UN Gilad Erdan stated that a ceasefire would result in "another attempted Holocaust".

=== Post-war plans ===
On 5 January 2024, the Israeli government released a framework for Gaza following the end of the conflict, stating Hamas would not control the Strip with it instead being run by a "Palestinian entity" with a continued Israeli military presence. In the plan released by defense minister Yoav Gallant, the IDF would retain military control and Israel would "guide" the Palestinian civil administration while the U.S. and other countries oversaw rebuilding in the Gaza Strip.

On 10 January, Benjamin Netanyahu stated, "I want to make a few points absolutely clear: Israel has no intention of permanently occupying Gaza or displacing its civilian population." On 15 January, Yoav Gallant stated Gaza "will be ruled by Palestinians" after the war. On 18 January, Netanyahu stated, "In any future arrangement… Israel needs security control all territory west of the Jordan. So it contradicts the idea of self-rule [for Palestinians]. So what?" Following backlash from western politicians, Netanyahu wrote that Israel "will not compromise on full Israeli security control over the entire area west of Jordan." Benny Gantz stated the war could last "10 years, or even an entire generation". On 30 January, Yoav Gallant reportedly stated he would like Israel to operate freely in Gaza as it does in the West Bank.

A report leaked from the prime minister's office showed a three step post-war plan for Gaza, with the first being Israeli military rulership, then an international Arab coalition, and finally, a Palestinian state. Netanyahu's official postwar plan suggested full military occupation of Gaza and the dismantling of UNRWA.

== Political response ==
=== Mass detentions of Palestinians ===
Since the outbreak of the Gaza war on October 7, Israel has carried out mass arrests and detentions of Palestinians, with thousands arrested or detained in Israel and the occupied Palestinian territories. News outlets and human rights organizations both within and outside of Israel reported that thousands of Gazan workers in Israel were detained or disappeared in the weeks following October 7. Additionally, Israel has carried out mass arrests in the occupied West Bank, detained Palestinian fighters captured inside Israel, and arrested Palestinian citizens of Israel.

Concerns have been raised regarding the legality, secrecy, and conditions of many detentions, including widespread mistreatment and allegations of torture. On November 3, Israel reportedly deported 3,200 Palestinian workers to the Gaza Strip. In addition to Palestinian prisoners in custody prior to the outbreak of the war, an unknown number of individuals remain in detention. More than 3,000 Palestinians have been arrested in the West Bank and occupied East Jerusalem since October 7, according to the UN. Images of Israel's mass arrests in Gaza circulated widely during the war, showing men with no known organizational affiliations stripped naked, tied up, and blindfolded. Human rights organizations described Israel's mass arrest campaigns in Gaza as "random and arbitrary".

In February 2024, UNRWA accused Israel of torturing United Nations staff in order to extract false confessions that some UNRWA staff had been involved with the 7 October attack on Israel. The charge came amidst widespread reports of the torture of Palestinians in Israeli prisons following 7 October.

=== Settler expansions ===
The Israeli government approved new expansions in occupied East Jerusalem during the war. On 14 December, Amichai Chikli, the Social Equality Minister, stated Israeli settlements in the Gaza Strip were a possibility "in certain parts where it makes sense". On 30 December, Israeli finance minister Bezalel Smotrich stated the "future" of Gaza settlements would be determined after the war. In a later statement, Smotrich said Israelis in Gaza would "make the desert bloom". On 4 January, Israeli Defense Minister Yoav Gallant stated Israel would not have a "civil presence" in Gaza after the war but would retain unrestricted military movement in it. On 7 January, Itamar Ben-Gvir stated Israeli settlements in Gaza were the "order of the hour". On 8 January, Middle East Eye reported a group of MKs met with Nachala to discuss plans to build future Jewish settlements in Gaza. Israel approved 700 new settler units in East Jerusalem on 9 January.

Israeli tourism minister Haim Katz, as well as other Likud party members, announced a conference for Israeli settlements in Gaza in response to the 7 October attacks. The conference was planned to be hosted at Binyanei Hauma. It was held on 28 January and drew both Israeli cabinet ministers and members of parliament. Ben-Gvir was quoted stating, "In the first stage, we will encourage emigration – hundreds of thousands through a pilot, and we'll just transfer them". Ir Amim reported on 11 February that 17 settlements with around 8,400 units had been approved in East Jerusalem since the start of the conflict. On 22 February, Bezalel Smotrich approved 3,344 new settler homes in the West Bank. The move was criticized by Josep Borrell who stated it was "inflammatory and dangerous". The French Ministry of Foreign Affairs also condemned the announcement, stating, "Colonisation is incompatible with the creation of a Palestinian State. As well as being an obstacle to a lasting peace, this policy is also fuelling violence and tensions on the ground". The UAE, Germany, Qatar, and Bahrain also condemned the expansion. Denmark also condemned the expansion.

In March 2024, it was reported that sales of property in the West Bank were being promoted internationally with events being hosted in synagogues in the United States and Canada. After the Israeli government announced in March 2024 it was confiscating 800 hectares of land in the West Bank, the Israeli watchdog organization Peace Now stated it was the single largest land seizure since the passage of the 1993 Oslo Accords. The Palestinian Foreign Ministry condemned the expropriation as part of Israel's "theft" of the Palestinian homeland. The Arab Parliament condemned the land seizure. The European Union released a statement, saying, "In line with its longstanding common position and UN Security Council Resolutions, the EU will not recognise changes to the 1967 borders unless agreed by the parties".

On 31 March 2024, Smotrich announced an expanded Israeli settlement in Wadi Auja, calling it an "appropriate Zionist response" to an attack against Israelis in the Jordan Valley. Yitzhak Wasserlauf, an Israeli cabinet official, stated, "A total victory means a return to settle" the Gaza Strip. In May 2024, Defense Minister Yoav Gallant announced settlers evacuated from the West Bank in 2005 would be allowed to return.

=== Hostages ===
==== Meetings with families ====
Meetings between the Israeli government and the families of hostages held in Gaza were described as chaotic and tense. During a meeting, a family member criticized that the hostages were under "constant threat from the IDF shelling." The brother of one of the three captives killed by Israeli forces in Gaza told Yoav Gallant that his brother would haunt Gallant in his sleep. During a meeting with hostage families, Sara Netanyahu, the Spouse of the Prime Minister of Israel, reportedly accused the families of helping Hamas. In March 2024, the hostage families went directly to U.S. president Biden to request for a hostage deal, stating they were frustrated by "the lack of ongoing communication and commitment" from the War Cabinet.

==== Negotiations ====
The Israeli government approved a hostage-exchange with Hamas to release Palestinian prisoners held in Israel for hostages held in Gaza.

=== Humanitarian aid ===
Controversies arose over the delivery of humanitarian aid to Gaza following the 7 October attack. Israel first announced a total blockade of all relief into the Strip, but eventually allowed limited aid in. By January 2024, agencies like the United Nations criticized Israel for not allowing sufficient aid, and as a result, creating a famine affecting nearly 500,000 Palestinians. In response, COGAT stated there was no hunger in Gaza. Diaa Rashwan, the chairman of the State Information Service, stated Israel's "stubbornness and intentionality" had resulted in the delay of humanitarian aid delivery.

=== Public diplomacy ===
The Israel Defense Forces (IDF) designated a Spokesperson's Unit to be responsible for the IDF's information policy and deal with the media relations during peace and war time. It served as a liaison between the military and the domestic and foreign media markets as well as the general public and functioned as a key player for the public diplomacy of Israel. In March 2024, Israel Katz ordered Israeli embassies around the world to begin a large-scale hasbara campaign about alleged sexual violence on 7 October, including "media interviews, distributing messages across social media platforms, and engaging in meetings with decision-makers".

== Civil response ==
=== Protests ===
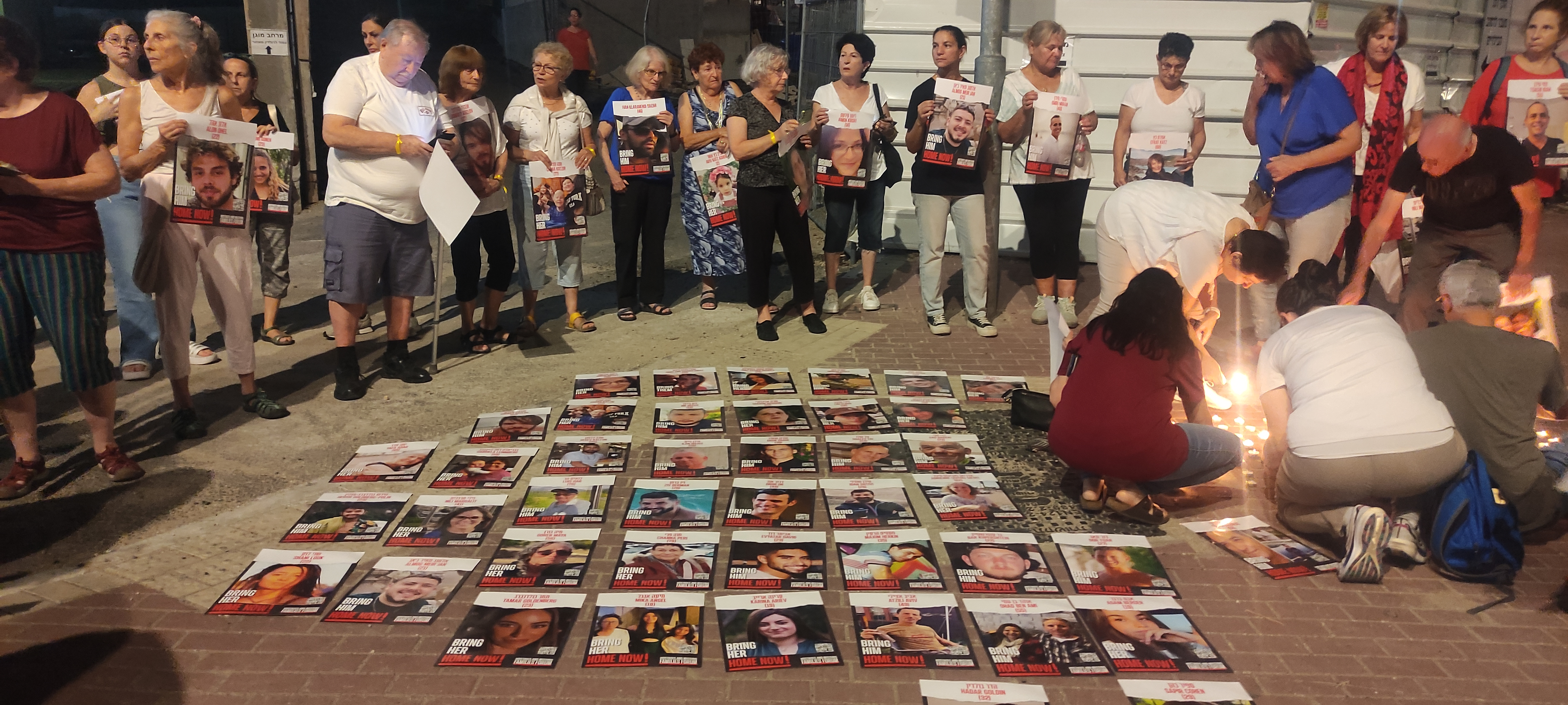
Bring them Home protest in Gedera

Arab Israelis reported a government crackdown on free speech, with individuals arrested for social media posts and likes. On 15 October, communications minister Shlomo Karhi proposed emergency regulations allowing for the arrest of individuals who hurt "national morale." Following a rally in support of Gaza in Haifa, police commissioner Kobi Shabtai threatened to send antiwar protesters to the Gaza Strip on buses.

On 8 November, the Israel Supreme Court allowed police to bar all anti-war protests. On 9 November, Israeli police arrested former MK Mohammad Barakeh in Nazareth for attempting to organize an anti-war protest. In an interview with Time Magazine, Barakeh described the Israeli government as establishing a fascist regime. On 18 November, Israel held its first permitted anti-war protest in Tel Aviv.

On 23 November, communications minister Shlomo Karhi proposed defunding the newspaper Haaretz due to its "defeatist and false propaganda." On 23 November, ahead of the hostage-swap, National Security Minister Itamar Ben Gvir stated that any "expressions of joy" related to the release of Palestinian prisoners was "equivalent to backing terrorism." On 29 November, police arrested activists at a Knesset protest opposing the government.

=== Censorship ===
On November 8, the Knesset criminalized the systematic and extended consumption of Hamas and ISIS publications that include statements of praise, sympathy or encouragement for acts of terrorism, or documentation of an act of terrorism. The law states that consumption of publications that is done randomly, innocently or for a legitimate purpose will not constitute prohibited consumption. The law was enacted as a temporary two-year measure, with the possibility of extension. Civil rights groups criticized the bill, stating it "invades the realm of personal thoughts and beliefs." On 2 December, an attorney at Adalah, an Israeli legal center, stated law enforcement was using the law to surveil and silence individuals, while Association for Civil Rights in Israel said it was "unprecedented in democratic countries." Akiva Eldar, a journalist at Haaretz, stated the bill "turned the journalists from doing honest, balanced reporting into Israeli patriots."

On 17 January, 7amleh, the Arab Center for the Advancement of Social Media, reported that since 7 October, Israeli authorities had cracked down on Palestinians "for simply expressing their views or opinions on various online platforms, through a variety of measures including censorship, surveillance and arrests".

The Ministry of Education announced in January 2024 that it was withdrawing funding for an annual Shavuot event in Megiddo, due to the event's host being Lucy Aharish, the Palestinian wife of Jewish Israeli celebrity Tsahi Halevi. The Knesset moved to expel Ofer Cassif for signing his support for South Africa's ICJ lawsuit, leading Adalah to state, "This case marks a direct extension of the nearly four-month-long crackdown on Palestinians' free speech and expressions of dissent".

=== Law ===
On 5 February 2024, the Knesset passed a one-year extension barring Palestinians from receiving Israeli permanent resident status through marriage to Israelis. On 19 March 2024, Itamar Ben-Gvir stated that 100,000 new Israeli gun licenses had been approved since 7 October.

== International response ==
=== United Nations ===
In the aftermath of the 7 October attack and during the subsequent conflict, the Israeli government criticized the United Nations. On multiple occasions, Israeli officials called for the resignation of UN secretary-general António Guterres. It also moved to limit the issuance of travel visas to UN representatives. Lynn Hastings, the UN Humanitarian Coordinator for the Occupied Palestinian Territory, was forced to leave Israel after her visa was revoked. The United Nations criticized Israel for bombing its facilities and killing 142 UN employees, while Israel stated the UN was biased.

==== UNRWA ====
On 4 January 2024, Israel Hayom reported Knesset members were seeking to halt global funding for UNRWA, with MK Sharren Haskel stating they sought "to stop funds which are being transferred from various countries to this organization, and remove UNRWA's mask". On 6 January, former Israeli foreign ministry official Noga Arbell stated, "It will not be possible to win the war if we do not destroy UNRWA. And this destruction must begin immediately". On 26 January, Israel alleged that 12 UNRWA staff members had been involved with the 7 October attack, based on "interrogations of militants". This led to their immediate dismissal and to the U.S. pausing all funding to the agency. The following day, the UK, Italy, Finland, Australia, Germany, and Canada paused their funding to UNRWA. In response, Foreign Minister Israel Katz stated Israel "aims to promoting a policy ensuring that UNRWA will not be a part of the day after".

=== World Health Organization ===
Israel accused the World Health Organization of colluding with Hamas, leading the WHO Secretary General Tedros Adhanom Ghebreyesus to state, "Such false claims are harmful and can endanger our staff who are risking their lives to serve the vulnerable."

=== Red Cross ===
Israeli Ambassador to the UN Gilad Erdan accused the Red Cross of colluding with Hamas, stating, "Hamas is committing heinous and abhorrent war crimes, and the Red Cross covers it up".

== Officials' statements ==
Statements by Israeli government officials drew international scrutiny, including many which were described as genocidal. On 9 October, Israeli Defense Minister Yoav Gallant referred to Hamas militants in the Gaza Strip as "human animals", sparking controversy. On 17 December, the chair of the Metula Regional council stated Gaza should be left "desolate and destroyed" and turned into a museum, leading the Auschwitz-Birkenau State Museum to condemn him.

=== Knesset members ===
Several Knesset members drew headlines for their statements. MK Meirav Ben-Ari caused controversy when she stated, "The children in Gaza brought it upon themselves." In a post on X, MK Galit Distel-Atbaryan called for erasing Gaza "from the face of the earth," and that "the Gazan monsters will fly to the southern fence and try to enter Egyptian territory. or they will die." MK Ariel Kallner called for a Nakba, writing on social media, "Right now, one goal: Nakba! A Nakba that will overshadow the Nakba of 48." Nissim Vaturi, the Knesset deputy speaker, called for the military to "Burn Gaza now." On 27 December, MK Avigdor Lieberman stated Israel should tear down the Gaza-Egyptian border, stating, "As soon as there is no obstacle there, I estimate one-and-a-half million Gazans will leave for Sinai and we will not disturb anyone". In an interview with Kol Barama radio station on 10 January, Nissim Vaturi stated, "Gaza and its people must be burned".

On 14 January, MK Zvi Sukkot drew headlines for stating, "At least in the northern Gaza Strip we first have to conquer, annex, destroy all the houses, build neighborhoods". One week later, on 21 January, Sukkot stated, "It is necessary to occupy and annex at least part of the northern Gaza Strip and to establish Israeli settlements there." On 22 February, May Golan stated she was "personally proud of the ruins of Gaza".

Some progressive politicians, such as Gilad Kariv, called for the creation of a sovereign Palestinian state.

=== Prime minister ===
Prime minister Benjamin Netanyahu also drew headlines for his statements during the war. Notably, Netanyahu stated the war was "a struggle between the children of light and the children of darkness, between humanity and the law of the jungle." Netanyahu also termed the conflict as "Israel's second War of Independence". Netanyahu was criticized as calling for genocide when he compared Palestinians to Amalek, quoting from Samuel 15:3, "slay both man and woman, infant and suckling". He also drew controversy for stating, "I am the only one who will prevent a Palestinian state" after the war. In December 2023, Netanyahu said that Israel should support the "voluntary migration" of Palestinians from Gaza.

=== Cabinet officials ===
Cabinet member and other top-level government officials caused controversy for their statements in response to the 7 October attack and during the war. Eli Cohen, the Minister of Foreign Affairs, drew headlines for stating that after the war, "the territory of Gaza will also decrease." The Minister of Agriculture, Avi Dichter, caused controversy for his statement, "We're Rolling Out Nakba 2023." The Minister of Heritage Amihai Eliyahu drew headlines for stating, "They can go to Ireland or deserts, the monsters in Gaza should find a solution by themselves." Gilad Erdan, Israel's UN ambassador, made several notable statements, including, "Israel is not at war with human beings, we are at war with monsters."

Israeli president Isaac Herzog drew criticisms of admitting to collective punishment when he stated, "It is an entire nation out there that is responsible." Israel Katz, the Minister of Energy, drew similar criticisms when he stated the people of Gaza "will not receive a drop of water or a single battery until they leave the world". Shlomo Karhi, the Minister of Communications, suggested soldiers would return to Israel "only after they have cut off" the foreskins of Palestinian men. Itamar Ben-Gvir, the Minister of Defense, drew headlines when he stated, "What's needed here is an occupation." In an interview with Israeli Army Radio, Finance Minister Bezalel Smotrich called Gaza a "ghetto" that should be resettled.

In comments made to Maariv, Bezalel Smotrich stated, "The push for the establishment of a Palestinian state is a push for the next massacre." In May 2024, Ben-Gvir called to "end the problem" and "return to Gaza now!"

=== Diplomats ===
Israel's ambassador to the United Kingdom, Tzipi Hotovely, drew condemnation from British MP Afzal Khan, after responding "Do you have another solution?" to an interviewer asking if she was calling for the total destruction of Gaza.

=== Former officials ===
Several former military and government officials drew attention for their statements related to the attack and subsequent war. Giora Eiland, a former general, stated, "Creating a severe humanitarian crisis is a necessary means to achieve the goal. Gaza will become a place where no human being can exist." Dan Gillerman, the former Israeli ambassador to the UN stated, "I am very puzzled by the constant concern which the world is showing for the Palestinian people, and is actually showing for these horrible inhuman animals who have done the worst atrocities that this century has seen"

In an interview with Jewish News Syndicate, retired Israeli Major General Itzhak Brik stated "All of our missiles, the ammunition, the precision-guided bombs, all the airplanes and bombs, it's all from the US. The minute they turn off the tap, you can't keep fighting. You have no capability."

Michael Oren, former Israeli ambassador to the US, former member of the Knesset, and former Deputy Minister in the Prime Minister's Office, wrote: "Hamas and Palestinian Islamic Jihad made a serious miscalculation". Aviv Kohavi stated that a full investigation was needed to determine how militants had breached Israel's walls around Gaza. Former-Israeli Defence Minister Avigdor Liberman suggested the West Bank should be given to Jordan, and the Gaza Strip to Egypt.

== Social media ==
The official Israeli government and military social media accounts were highly active during the war. The Ministry of Foreign Affairs funded a pro-war PR campaign online. On 12 December, an investigation by the Israeli newspaper Haaretz found the Israeli military was running a Telegram channel called "72 Virgins - Uncensored". The IDF admitted to running the Telegram channel. Posts on the IDF channel had included statements about "exterminating the roaches" of Gaza and hearing "the crunch of their bones". In January 2024, the Israeli government reportedly purchased a technological system for conducting large-scale influence campaigns online.

== Reactions ==
Israel's response to the 7 October attack elicited international reactions. In January 2024, the German Federal Foreign Office criticized senior Israeli government officials for their role in a conference advocating for the settling of Gaza, stating, "We condemn in the strongest possible terms the participation of parts of the Israeli government at this resettlement conference and clearly reject the statements made there."

== See also ==
- U.S. government response to the September 11 attacks
- International reactions to the Gaza war
- United States support for Israel in the Gaza war
- Ninth Extraordinary Session of the Islamic Summit Conference
- Gaza war protests
