= Ministry of Information (Egypt) =

Government ministry of Egypt

Arab Republic of Egypt Ministry of Information
- وزارة الاعلام
- Emblem of Egypt

Agency overview
- Formed: 1971
- Preceding agency: Ministry of Culture and National Guidance
- Jurisdiction: Government of Egypt
- Agency executive: Diaa Rashwan, Minister of Information
- Website: www.ecm.gov.eg

Footnotes
- Re-established in February 2026

The Ministry of Information (Arabic: وزارة الإعلام) is the ministry in charge of state-owned media and press in Egypt, and for regulating the practices through affiliate agencies. Established in 1971, the ministry has been dissolved and re-established several times, most recently being revived in February 2026 under the leadership of Diaa Rashwan.

== History and profile ==
During president Anwar Sadat's 11 year tenure, the ministry was renamed and restructured a number of times. In the first cabinet in October 1970 the Ministry of Culture and National Guidance was split into one for culture, and another for national guidance with Mohamed Fayek appointed as minister Within a month the Ministry of National Guidance was renamed as the Ministry of Information with the same minister. After a further few months, in May 1971, the Mohamed Abdelqader Hatem was named Deputy Prime Minister and Minister of Information.

In 1978 after signing a peace treaty with Israel, Sadat restructured the government and dissolved the ministry with his new prime minister Mostafa Khalil saying that "state supervision of the information media has come to an end." This would not last long, and In 1979 it was again bundled as the Ministry of Culture and Information (during Mansour Hassan's tenure).

Under president Hosni Mubarak, the Ministry of Information was reestablished in 1982 after being spun off from the Ministry of Culture and Information. In 1986 Mubarak officially set out its mandate bringing the Egyptian Radio and Television Union and the State Information Service under its supervision. The ministry would remain intact with only two ministers taking the post during Mubarak's 30-year rule.

The Ministry of Information was dissolved in February 2011 when the new cabinet was created under Prime Minister Essam Sharaf in the wake of the Egyptian Revolution and the purge of Hosni Mubarak's regime.

However, it was reestablished a few months later in July 2011 and Osama Heikal was appointed as minister

The ministry was dissolved for a third time in 2021 after the resignation of Osama Heikal, and was not reestablished in the following cabinet reshuffle in 2022. During this period, the National Media Authority took up most of its duties overseeing state-owned media.

On 10 February 2026, the Egyptian House of Representatives approved a limited cabinet reshuffle which included the revival of the Ministry of Information. Diaa Rashwan, who was serving as the head of the State Information Service (SIS), was appointed to lead the ministry.

== List of Egyptian Ministers of Information (incomplete) ==
President Anwar Sadat (1970 — 1981)

- Ahmed Kamal Abulmagd (1974 — )
- Mansour Hassan (1979–1981; as minister of culture and information)

President Hosni Mubarak (1981 — 2011)

- Safwat El-Sherif (1982–2004)
- Mamdouh al-Beltagui (2004 —2005)
- Anas el-Fiqqi (2005–2011)

Supreme Council of the Armed Forces (2011 — 2012)

- Osama Heikal (2011–2012)

President Mohamed Morsi (2012 — 2013)

- Salah Abdel Maqsoud (2012–2013)

Interim President Adly Mansour

- Dorreya Sharaf El-Din (July 2013–June 2014)

President Abdelfattah al-Sisi (2014 — )

- Osama Heikal (2020–2022, ministry dissolved)
- Diaa Rashwan (2026–present)

== Affiliated agencies ==
- Egyptian Radio and Television Union (ERTU)
- State Information Service (SIS)
- Middle East News Agency (MENA)
- Egyptian Media Production City (EMPC)
- Nilesat

== See also ==
- Mass media in Egypt
- Cabinet of Egypt
