= Mohamed Arab =

Egyptian politician (born 1948)

Minister of Culture
- In office July 2012 – July 2014
- Prime Minister: Hazem Al Beblawi; Ibrahim Mahlab
- Preceded by: Alaa Abdel Fattah
- Succeeded by: Gaber Asfour
- In office April 2012 – May 2012
- Prime Minister: Kamal Ganzouri; Hisham Qandil
- Preceded by: Himself

Personal details
- Born: Mohamed Saber Ibrahim Arab; 23 December 1948 (age 77) Desouk, Kingdom of Egypt
- Party: Independent

Mohamed Arab, also known as Mohamed Saber Arab, (born 23 December 1948) is a veteran politician, who served as Egypt's Minister of Culture in different cabinets, including the Beblawi cabinet.

== Early life ==
Arab was born on 23 December 1948.

== Career ==
Arab worked as a professor of modern Arab history at Al Azhar University in Egypt from 1974 to 2011. He was a visiting professor at Sultan Qaboos University in Muscat, Oman from 1986 to 1991 and at Emirates University in 1994. He also worked as a professor of modern history at the Arabian Researches and Studies Institute of the Arab League in Egypt 1994 to 2011. In addition, he was the chairman of the Egyptian National Library and Archives (2005–2009) and of the Egypt's general authority for books and national documents (2009–2011). In 2011, he retired from public post and became culture committee reporter at the National Council for Women.

Arab served as the minister of culture in the interim government headed by Kamal Ganzouri from April 2012. He resigned from his post in May 2012 and was succeeded by Mohamed Ibrahim in the post. Arab was renamed as the minister of culture in July 2012 and continued to serve in the same post in the Qandil cabinet that became effective in August 2012. On 4 February 2013, he resigned again in protest of brutal violence against protesters. On 7 May 2013, Alaa Abdel-Aziz El-Sayed Abdel-Fattah was appointed culture minister in a cabinet reshuffle to succeed him in the post.

Arab was reappointed culture minister to the interim government led by Hazem Al Beblawi on 16 July 2013. Arab's term ended in July 2014, and he was replaced by Gaber Asfour in the post.

=== Awards ===
Arab is the Egyptian State Award winner in social sciences of 2012 that was given in July 2012.
