= State Information Service =

Egyptian government agency

Arab Republic of Egypt State Information Service
- Emblem of Egypt

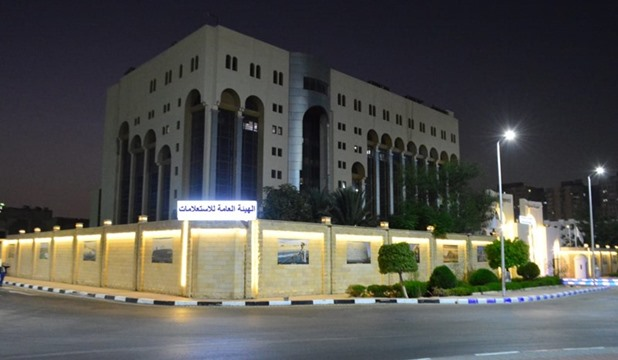
- Headquarters in Cairo

Agency overview
- Formed: 1954
- Jurisdiction: President of Egypt
- Headquarters: Cairo, Egypt
- Agency executive: Diaa Rashwan, Director
- Website: www.sis.gov.eg

The State Information Service is an Egyptian government agency affiliated with the Egyptian Presidency. It is the official media and public relations apparatus of the Egyptian state, with a number of local and international offices, and it's responsible for regulating the affairs of foreign press and media correspondents in Egypt.

== History ==
The SIS was founded in 1954 as the Information Authority (maslahat al-isti'lamat, Arabic: مصلحة الإستعلامات) by the Revolutionary Command Council on the eve of the republican era, two years after the Free Officers led by ⁣⁣Colonel⁣⁣ Gamal Abdel Nasser toppled King Farouk and abolished the monarchy. Revolutionary Command Council member Salah Salem was SIS's first chairman.

In 1967, it was restructured into the State Information Service (SIS) and affiliated with the Ministry of Culture and National Guidance (wizarat al-thaqafa wal-irshad al-qawmi), during Tharwat Okasha's tenure, and given the mandate of supporting the ministry in "identifying local and international public opinion towards issues and events that concern the state, and in the field of guiding, educating, and enlightening local public opinion."

The SIS was given ten main responsibilities, including gauging public opinion, producing and disseminating media on national issues (pamphlets, books, radio, and television programs) to influence local and global public opinion, producing regular briefs for high-level government agencies on key local and international political issues, regulating foreign journalism in Egypt, and regulating aspects of local journalism overseen by the ministry of culture.

After the Ministry of Information (the successor of the National Guidance portfolio) was spun off from the Ministry of Culture in the early 1980s, the SIS was officially transferred to it in 1986.

In September 2012 President Mohamed Morsi issued a decree making SIS an agency subordinate to the presidency instead of the Ministry of Information.

== Chairpersons ==
The SIS has had chairmen that served at high levels of government in the defense, information or foreign affairs ministries, as well as intelligence. The current Chairman of SIS, Diaa Rashwan a journalist and a former head of the Press Syndicate, was appointed to the post by president Abdel Fattah el-Sisi in June 2017. Among the previous chairmen of SIS was Safwat El-Sherif one of the leading and controversial figures in deposed president Hosni Mubarak's government.

- Salah Salem (1954–1955)
- Amin Howeidi (1965–1966)
- Ahmed Asmat Abdel-Meguid (1967–1967)
- Mohamed Hassan al-Zayat (1967 — 1972)
- Mohamed Hassan al-Zayat (1972 — 1977, In addition to Minister of Information)
- Morsi Saad Eldin Abdel Hamid (1977 — 1979, also presidential spokesperson)
- Safwat El-Sherif (1979–1980)
- Mohamed Hakki (1980 — 1982, also presidential spokesperson)
- Mamdouh El Beltagui (1982 - 1993)
- Nabil Othman (1994–2003)
- Taha Abdel Alim (2003–2004)
- Nasser Kamel (2005–2006)
- Diaa Rashwan (2017–present)

== International offices ==
Presidential Decree 1820/1967 mandated SIS to establish an international presence to share and disseminate facts about Egypt. Today, SIS operates 32 international press offices affiliated witho Egypt's consular missions.

- Berlin
- London
- Paris
- Washington D.C.
