= Cultural Park for Children =

Public park in Cairo, Egypt

Coordinates: 30.031247°N 31.246944°E

- Interactive map of Cultural Park for Children
- Type: Urban park
- Location: Sayeda Zeinaib in Cairo, Egypt
- Area: 2.5 acres (1.0 ha)
- Created: 1990
- Designer: Abdelhalim Ibrahim Abdelhalim
- Operator: Ministry of Culture (Egypt)
- Status: Open

The Cultural Park for Children (Arabic: الحديقة الثقافية للأطفال) is a public park in Sayeda Zeinab, Cairo, Egypt. The park was completed in 1990 on 2.5 acres (0.010 km^{2}) of land owned by the Ministry of Culture (Egypt). In the late 1970s, the Ministry of Culture designated architect Abdelhalim Ibrahim Abdelhalim to develop a set of cultural facilities for children on the historical site of the el-Hud el-Marsoud Garden. The park's construction began in June 1983 and concluded in November 1990.

== Facilities ==
The facilities housed within the Cultural Park for Children begin with an entrance plaza, which leads into an exhibition and festival plaza. These areas are used primarily as walking area for families, and provide a venue for vendors and outdoor exhibitions

The library and media center are housed in the central area of the park, and contain a studio, reading room, and a computer lab.

Surrounding the key components of the park are both a palm-tree boulevard and various green terraces. The palm-tree boulevard provides an area floored with gravel, which is surrounded by water elements. The green terraces provide various elevated areas, which house plants, seating, and recreational areas.

The Abou El-Dahab Street Wall is composed of the collective edges of the green terraces. This wall links the adjacent street to the park, but also contains built-in rooms for a café, fountain, community room, prayer space, along with various shops.

== Project significance ==
The park is located in one of the older and more established areas within Cairo. Within walking distance from the park are two Tulunid era mosques, Ibn Tulun and Sayeda Zeinab.

The segment of land upon which the park was constructed also holds historical significance in that it previously housed a Mamluk era garden known s Al-Hod Al-Marsoud. Prior to the construction of the Cultural Park for Children, the site was overgrown and a center of gang activity. The celebration of the mould, a remembrance festival for Sayeda Zeinab, was typically the only instance within which the park’s area was utilized to full capacity.

The architect utilized these elements of historical and cultural significance as primary inspiration for the potential of the park’s site, as well as the functions of the park.

== Construction ==
The construction of Cultural Park for Children cost $0.6M (USD) and faced relatively few challenges, as the park is on relatively flat and well-packed material. Abdelhalim’s project scope included upgrades to infrastructure in the park and surrounding area, particularly electricity, sewage, water and telecommunications.

Abdelhalim placed an emphasis on the use of local resources. The technology used in the construction phase was sourced from the Sayeda Zeinab area, while the building materials were brought in from around Egypt. The craftsmen component of the labor force was sourced on the three major communities within Sayeda Zeinab, the Bassatine, Tulund and Darrasah. The workers originated from Upper Egypt, and the professionals were also exclusively Egyptian.

== Awards ==
The Cultural Park for Children and Abdelhalim Ibrahim Abdelhalim were recognized in the 1992 Fifth Cycle of the Aga Khan Award for Architecture.
