= Magda Saleh =

Egyptian ballet dancer (1944 – 2023)

- ماجدة صالح
- Born: 2 April 1944; Cairo, Egypt
- Died: 11 June 2023 (aged 79); Cairo, Egypt
- Education: Higher Institute of Ballet; Moscow State Academy of Choreography; University of Southern California (MFA); New York University (PhD)
- Occupation: Ballet dancer
- Spouse: Jack Josephson (m. 1993; died 2022)

Magda Saleh (Arabic: ماجدة صالح; 2 April 1944 – 11 June 2023) was an Egyptian ballet dancer.

== Biography ==
Saleh was born in Cairo in 1944, the daughter of an Egyptian father and Scottish mother. She studied English literature before attending the Higher Institute of Ballet and receiving a scholarship to attend the Moscow State Academy of Choreography. Upon her return to Egypt, she became a founding member of the Cairo Opera Ballet Company. In 1966, she staged her first performance, The Fountain of Bakhchisarai. The performance was viewed by President Gamal Abdel Nassar, who was so impressed that he awarded her the Order of Merit and sent her and her co-stars on a tour of Egypt, notably in Aswan, where the Aswan Dam was being built. By the end of the 1960s, she had become the most notable ballerina in Egypt, having been invited to perform at the Bolshoi Theatre and the Mariinsky Theatre.

In 1971, the Khedivial Opera House burned down, which dealt a fatal blow to Saleh's ballet company. Additionally, President Anwar Sadat severed ties with the Soviet Union. In response, many Egyptian ballerinas emigrated to Europe, Russia, or the United States. Saleh chose to settle in the latter. She received a master's degree in modern dance from the University of Southern California and a PhD from New York University, for studies in traditional Egyptian dance.

After the assassination of Anwar Sadat and Hosni Mubarak's rise to power, she returned to Egypt in 1983 to chair the Higher Institute of Ballet and later the Cairo Opera House in 1988. At the beginning of the 1990s, she was forced to give up power and returned to the United States, where lived in Shelter Island, New York. She was married to Egyptologist Jack Josephson from 1993 until his death in 2022.

After Josephson's death, Saleh returned to Cairo to be closer to family, where she died on 11 June 2023, at the age of 79.
