= Mahmmud Nasim =

Egyptian poet, critic, and playwright (1955–2021)

- Born: 1955
- Died: 2021 (aged 65–66); Egypt
- Occupations: Poet, Civil worker
- Notable work: Mar’a Al-Guzlan (The Deer Pasture) Ors Al-Rramad (Ash Wedding)

Mahmmud Nasim Al-jawhari (Arabic: محمود نسيم السيد الجوهري) was an Egyptian poet, critic, and playwright (1955–2021).

== Life ==
Mahmmud was born in Mait Mohsen on March 3, 1955. His mother is the lady Ghosoun Alward Abdullah, and his father is Mr. Alsaid Aljawhari, a graduate of Madrasat Almu’llemeen (Teachers’ School) in Tanta. His father was an Arabic teacher, then he became a headmaster of many schools. He was fond of Ahmed Shawqi (the prince of poets). As a result, Mahmmud inherited his father's love of poetry. Nasim was the eighth and youngest of his siblings. His older brother was not present with his family since he was a high-ranking military officer in the Egyptian Armed Forces. Therefore, their parents cared for Mahmmud a lot. Mahmmud studied at Halmiyat Alzzayton middle school, and secondary school at Ibn Khaldun. He loved reading books and unlike his peers, he dreamed of being a poet. He loved to do volunteer work as he participated in Civil Defence Forces during The October War (Yom Kippur War) in 1973. After the war, he joined the Egyptian Communist Party in its early years and volunteered to teach schoolchildren at the headquarters of the socialist union. In 1977, he co-founded the Ida’a (Light) magazine with some writers and intellectuals. in 1983, the same magazine published his first poetry collection entitled Alssama’ Wa Qaus Albahr (The Sky and the Sea Arch). Remembering the Beni Suef Cultural Palace fire in 2005, the theatre director Ezzet Zain said that “Mahmmud supported regional teams and theatres in time of need, a time when taking responsibility was dangerous. He felt so sad for the loss of his dearest friends in the fire.” He worked sincerely without looking up promotions. He supported many creative young people, whether in writing or directing. Those young people consulted him whenever things get rough. He was once a committee member for selecting leaders of General Organisation of Culture Palaces. He wrote some poetry collections. Some of his poems were published in Egyptian newspapers and magazines. Moreover, he participated in most Arabic and Egyptian festivals. Furthermore, some of his poems were translated into English. Mahmmud died due to the Coronavirus on April 21, 2021. He was buried in his hometown.

== Career ==
- Teacher in Faculty of Specific Education in Tanta and El-Abaseya.
- A jury member at General Organisation of Culture Palaces theatre.
- A jury member for selecting leaders of General Organisation of Culture Palaces.
- Establish Kitabat (writings) magazine with the two poets: Rif’at Salam and Sh’ban Yosuf.
- Participated in publishing Master magazines.
- Director of the General Theatre Administration.
- Editor-in-chief of the Theatre Horizons Series.

== Education ==
- Bachelor's degree in literature at Ain Shams University in 1980.
- Master's degree at Academy of Arts in Cairo in 1994.

== Awards ==
- The first prize of the Egyptian Supreme Council of Culture for his ballad Mar’a Al-Guzlan (The Deer Pasture) (1986).
- Su’ad AlSubah Prize for his poetry collection Ors Al-Rramad (Ash Wedding) (1991).
- The best scenario in 2016 for Rajul Al-Hikayat Scenario (Fairy Tale Man), which is part of Sawiris Cultural Awards.

== Works ==
- Savior and Victim: Visions of the World with Mahmoud Diab and Salah Abdul-Sabour (2013).
- The Arab Modernity Gap (2005).
- The Garden (2006).
- Ash Wedding (1989).
- Pottery Bird.
- Shadow Writing (1995).
- The Sky and the Sea Arch (1984).
- Play: The deer Pasture (1986).
