= Alexandria Center of Arts =

Cultural centre in Alexandria, Egypt

Coordinates: 31°11′43″N 29°54′0″E

The Alexandria Center of Arts (Arabic: مركز الاسكندرية للابداع, Alexandria Center for Creativity) is an arts center, community exhibitions space and cultural center in the city of Alexandria, Egypt, overseen by the Egyptian Ministry of Culture. The center was officially opened on 29 October 2001, by Farouk Hosni, Minister of Culture, and then-President Hosni Mubarak's wife, Suzanne Mubarak.
