= Shaker Abdul Hamid =

Egyptian politician (1952–2021)

- Born: June 20, 1952; Asyut, Egypt
- Died: March 18, 2021 (aged 68); Giza, Egypt
- Education: Cairo University
- Awards: Sheikh Zayed Book Award

Shaker Abdel Hamid Suleiman (June 20, 1952 – March 18, 2021) was the Egyptian Minister of Culture from 2011 to 2017. He served as Secretary General of the Supreme Council of Culture, then Minister of Culture at the Ministry of Kamal al-Ganzuri in December 2011. He was also a Professor of Creative Psychology at The Egyptian Academy of Arts.

He was director of the Talent Education Program at the Graduate School of the Arab Gulf University (Kingdom of Bahrain / 2005 -2011). He served as Dean of the Higher Institute of Art Criticism at the Academy of Arts in Egypt and later as Vice-President of the Academy from 2003 to 2005. Suleiman's academic works contributed to literary and plastic criticism. He specialized in the study of artistic creativity and taste in children and adults.

== Academic achievement ==
- Ph.D. major in creative psychology from Cairo University (1984)
- Held a master's degree in creative psychology from Cairo University (1980)
- Held a diploma in applied psychology specializing in clinical psychology from Cairo University (1976)
- Held a bachelor's degree in psychology from Cairo University (1974)

== Awards ==
- Shoman Prize for Young Arab Scholars in the Humanities, presented by the Abdul Hamid Shoman Foundation in The Hashemite Kingdom of Jordan in 1990.
- State Award for Excellence in Social Sciences, Egypt, 2003.
- Sheikh Zayed Prize for Art Writers -2012 for The Book of Art and Godmother

== Contributions to the Egyptian Ministry of Culture ==
- Participated in many conferences and seminars of the Supreme Council of Culture, the General Authority for Cultural Palaces, the Writers' Authority and the fine arts sector through research, chairing sessions or participating in discussions during the period from 1990.
- He chaired several cultural series published by the Ministry of Culture, particularly the "First Book" series of the Supreme Council of Culture, the "Critical Writings" series, "Translation Horizons", "Arab Horizons", at the General Authority for Cultural Palaces.
- Participated in several magazines published by the Ministry of Culture, including, but not exclusively, magazines: "Chapters", "Creativity", "Psychology", "Folk Arts", "New Culture". And so on.
- Previously contributed to the activities of the Supreme Council of Culture, he was a member of the founding committee of the National Translation Project and a member of the Committee on Fine Arts. He was also a member of committees: "The First Book", "Education and Psychology", among others.
- Reviewed several books published by the Cairo International Festival of Experimental Theatre of the Egyptian Ministry of Culture.
- Served as agent and dean of the Higher Institute of Art Criticism, Dean of the Higher Institute of Popular Arts, General Supervisor of the Language and Translation Center of the Academy of Arts and Vice-President of the Academy of Arts from 2003 to 2005.
- He also served as director of the Talent Research and Innovation Research Center of the Academy of Arts.
- With the former presidents of the Academy of Arts, Dr. Hani Mutawa and Dr. Medkur Thabet contributed to the follow-up and development of the academy's major projects, including the Plato Film Project, as well as the project of new institute buildings within the Academy.
- Chairman of the Committee for the Evaluation and Development of The Academy's Admissions Systems from April 17, 2005 to 2005.
- Chairman of the Visualization Committee for the Development of the Academy's Alexandria Unit.

== Published research and studies ==
- Mental illness and literary creativity, a study published in the Journal of The World of Thought in Kuwait, Volume 18, 1987.
- The progressive differences in children's performance on directed drawing and free drawing (an up-to-date study on children between the ages of 3-12) research presented to the Fourth Conference of Psychology in Egypt Cairo: Faculty of Arts, Eid Shams University, 1988.
- The relationships between painting and creativity (an up-to-date study on children aged 3–12 years) research presented to the first annual conference of Egyptian children. Raised and cared for in Cairo: Center for Children's Studies at Ain Shams University in 1988.
- Study the nutritional characteristics of the different stages of childhood, especially those related to the processes of upgrading creativity and intelligence, in: Shaker Abdul Hamid (editor), childhood and creativity, the first three parts, Kuwait, Kuwait Association for the Advancement of Arab Childhood 1989.
- Study the analysis of the content of children's drawings by color, shape, number of shapes ... In general, Shaker Abdul Hamid (editor), Childhood and Creativity, Part 4, Kuwait, Kuwait Association for the Advancement of Arab Childhood, 1989.
- Logical thinking and its relation to child painting activity in (Journal of Psychology) issue 1989 13.1 (in association).
- The relationship between curiosity and creativity at primary school is a study of gender comparison. (In partnership with Dr. Abdul Latif Khalifa) 6th Annual Conference on Psychology in Egypt. 1990.
- Love of exploration and creativity an up-to-date study at the primary and middle levels within the research of the Third Egyptian Children's Conference Center for Childhood Studies University of Ain Shams 1990, 769 750.
- The relationship of the socio-economic level of the parents to both the love of the survey and the eternity of a sample of the preparatory school students (Journal of Psychology) issue of September 15, 1990.
- The relationship between creativity and thinking in images and words was presented to the 7th Congress of Psychology in Egypt in 1991 (in partnership with Najib Khazam).
- Methods of developing artistic abilities in children (Journal of Psychology) Cairo, 1993.
- Imagination, curiosity and creativity in the primary stage (as part of the research of the second scientific conference of the Faculty of Education, Suez Canal University, Port Said Egypt under the title "The Arab Child creatively" on December 28, 1993.
- Flexibility as a fundamental variable in children's thinking (as part of the research of the 10th Congress of Psychology in Egypt) January 1994, p. 316.285.
- The relationship of accreditation independence from the field to creativity in the book (Studies in Personality and Creativity) "Edited by Faisal Younis and Shaker Abdel Hamid" Cairo House of Culture Publishing and Distribution 1994.
- The relationship of technical preference to some cognitive methods and some personality traits within the research (Conference of Art and Environment Faculty of Education) Helwan University 1994.
- Style and Creativity, Cairo University Faculty of Arts Magazine 27, 2.55 1995.
- A practical study of Piaget's tasks in logic thinking (joint) Journal of the Faculty of Arts Cairo University, accepted for publication.
- Learning methods and thinking and their relationships motivated by achievement (Journal of the Faculty of Arts) Cairo University 1995.
- Psychological Studies and Literature (Think tank) Kuwait 1995, 3, 2, 23 p. 211250
- The relationship of independence from the field and visual/verbal thinking by adapting and choosing specialization among university students (in association) "Journal of Educational Sciences" Institute of Educational Studies Cairo University. 1995, 1, 2 130 146.
- Popular tales and their role in raising the aesthetic sense of children (study presented to a scientific symposium on popular heritage and creativity among children held at the National Center for Children's Culture Egypt 1996).
- Psychological studies of aesthetic behavior. In Shaker Abdel Hamid, Moataz Abdullah and Juma Youssef, Psychological Studies in Artistic Taste Cairo: The Strange Library 1997, 3-73.
- Gender differences in aesthetic preference (in photography in particular) in Shaker Abdel Hamid, Moataz Abdullah and Juma Youssef (editor) p. 75,98 (in conjunction) psychological studies in the art tasting Cairo: The Library of Ghrib 1997.
- The relationship between aesthetic preference and some personality traits (in photography in particular) in Shaker Abdel Hamid, Moataz Abdullah and Juma Youssef (editor) psychological studies in artistic taste Cairo: Strange Library 1997–99, 142 (in association).
- Gender differences in aesthetic preference (in literature in particular) in Shaker Abdel Hamid, Moataz Abdullah and Juma Youssef (editor) psychological studies in artistic taste Cairo: Strange Library 1997 188, 143 (in association).
- The relationship between aesthetic preference and some personality traits (in literature in particular) in Shaker Abdel Hamid, Moataz Abdullah and Juma Youssef (editor) psychological studies in artistic taste Cairo: Strange Library 1997 189, 225 (in association).
- Dimensions of Aesthetic Preference Exploratory Study in Shaker Abdel Hamid, Moataz Abdullah and Juma Youssef (Editor) Psychological Studies in Artistic Taste Cairo: Gharib Library 1997, 277, 285 (in association).
- Gender differences in teaching and thinking methods are a comparative study of university students in Egypt and Oman. Psychological studies, 1998, 8, 2, 3, 229-359.
- Psychology and Literature.
- Children's Drawings.

== Works ==
- Creative Process in Photography Kuwait World of Knowledge Series No. 1987, 109.
- Al-Arrow and Shihab (Studies in The Arabic Story and Novel) Cairo and Tanta Egypt Publications Al-Rafii, 1987.
- Childhood and Creativity (five-part series) issued by the Kuwait Association for the Advancement of Arab Childhood Kuwait 1989.
- In General Psychology (in conjunction with others) Cairo Strange Library 1989.
- Psychological studies in artistic taste (a book that includes six researches on the taste of literature and the taste of fine arts, in addition to a theoretical introduction) Cairo Strange Library 1989.
- The psychological foundations of literary creativity in the short story, especially the Egyptian General Authority for Writers Cairo 1993.
- The scientific ally of the Arab Development Office of the Gulf States Riyadh 1993.
- Literature and Madness, The General Authority for The Palaces of Culture Cairo 1993.
- The Psychology of Creativity Cairo Strange Library 1995.
- The plastic vocabulary symbols and semantics of Cairo, the General Authority for The Palaces of Culture Egypt 1997.
- Discovery and talent development. 1995, Cairo: General Authority for Cultural Palaces.
- Dream, symbol and legend. Cairo General Authority of Egyptian Writers 1998.
- Studies in curiosity, imagination and creativity in partnership with AD. Abdul Latif Khalifa Cairo. Dar Ghraib Printing, Publishing and Distribution 2000.
- Aesthetic preference study in the psychology of technical taste Kuwait World of Knowledge series 2000.
- Humor and Laughter Series World of Knowledge Kuwait January 2003.
- Age of image, pros and cons. Kuwait: National Council for Culture, Arts and Literature - World of Knowledge Series, January 2005.
- Humor and social criticism mechanisms (in association). Cairo. Center for Social Studies at Cairo University 2004.
- Mechanisms of creativity and its constraints in the social sciences. Cairo Academy of Scientific Research. (2007).
- Visual arts and cognitive genius. Cairo: Al Ain Publishing, 2007 and a special edition of the Family Library.
- Fantasy from cave to virtual reality. Kuwait: World of Knowledge Series 2009.
- Art and strangeness. Cairo: Merritt Publishing and Distribution 2010 and a second edition of the Family Library 2010.
- The concept's strangeness and its manifestations in literature series World of Knowledge No. 384, January 2012.
- Art and the Development of Human Culture (2015), Cairo, Merritt Publishing and Distribution.
- Co-author of a book on talent and creativity by writing a chapter entitled "Talent, Creativity, Innovation and Invention: Relationships and Problems", published by the Hamdan Prize for Education and Education, UNITED Arab Emirates.
- Psychological Interpretation of Extremism and Terrorism (2017), BA, Egypt.
- Introduction to The Psychological Study of Literature (2017), Cairo: Egyptian-Lebanese House.
- Dream, Chemistry and Writing - In the World of Mohammed Afi Matar (2017), Cairo: Betana Publishing and Distribution House.

== Translations ==
- Myth and Meaning, written by Claude Levi Strauss, published in the 100-book Baghdad Book Of Public Cultural Affairs in 1988.
- Beginnings of Modern Psychology, written by W.M. O'Neill, published in the 100-year series Baghdad public cultural affairs house 1986.
- Genius, Creativity and Leadership Studies in Historical Measurement, by Dr. K. Simonton, World of Knowledge series in Kuwait 1996.
- Psychological study of literature, shortcomings, possibilities and achievements, by Martin Landauer Dar Okaz Saudi Arabia 1993 and the General Authority for Cultural Palaces Cairo 1996.
- Performing Arts Psychology, author: Glenn Wilson, Kuwait World of Knowledge Series Supreme Council for Culture, Arts and Literature World of Knowledge Series 2000.
- Dictionary of Basic Terms in Symothesa, issued by the Editions Unit of the Cairo Academy of Arts, 2002
- Joseph Renzoli, (2006) School Enrichment Curriculum, Cairo: Arab Thought House (in partnership with Dr. Safaa Al-Aser and Dr. Jaber Abdel Hamid)
- Vermeer Hat, edited by Timothy Brock. (In print) as part of the Kalima Translation Project - Abu Dhabi.
- Biology of Religious Behavior: The Evolutionary Roots of Faith and Religion, by: G. R.I.R. Ferman, (2015), National Translation Center, Egypt.
- Three Tempting Ideas, by Jerome Kagan (2017), National Translation Center, Egypt.

== Translated specialized research and studies ==
- Ecarat Shearer "Towards the History of Knowledge Science" International Journal of Social Sciences 1988 No. 115, p. 7 22.
- Eileen Weiner, How To Draw Children, Arab Horizons 1988 Second Issue, p. 8691.
- Freedom and Discipline in Creativity, by Philip Johnson Laird, Chapters 1-12, 1993: 215–235.
- Dostoevsky and the Murder of the Father, written by Sigmund Freud, Creation of July 1993, 31:46.

== Critical writing ==
A series of writings during which he employed psychology and creative studies in the fields of literary, formative and cinematic criticism, including, but not exclusively, the following:

=== Studies in Literary Criticism ===
- Egyptian short story, motives and ends, pens (Iraq) issue 41983,44-53.
- The world of Abdel Rahman Munif novelist, The Creativity of Egypt in the third year, first issue, January 1985 152–161.
- The Way of the Person, The Way of the Homeland (reading in the novel The Way of the Person by the Novelist Abdo Jubeir), The Literary Vanguard (Iraq), Year 11, 1985, January 23–30.
- Dream Shifts in the Beautiful City of Death, Egypt's Third Year Creation, September 9, 1985, 22–31.
- Read in Diwan (Grey Poems), Creativity, Third Year, Issue 10, October 25–32.
- The Other Time: The Dream and the Fusion of Legends, Chapters (Egypt) Volume V, Fourth Issue September 1985 26-230.
- The pain of loneliness and the infatuation of adventure (read in the pastoral diwan of Walid Munir) year 11 October 1985, 20-125.
- Arrow and Shihab, A Study in The Stories of Yahya Tahir Abdullah, Statement Kuwait Issue 231 June 1985, 39–50.
- Read in the walking group in the garden at night, Mahmoud al-Wardani Statement Kuwait Issue 233 August 1985.
- Murderers between the dissonant ness of consciousness and the collapse of the body (Creativity, Egypt) year 4 11, November 1986, 15–20.
- Self-portrait and the image of the other in the latest works of Yahya Taher Abdullah novelist, New Culture Egypt Issue 11 July 1986, 8-14.
- Read in the Collection of The High Sacrifice literary vanguard 1986 issue 8 22–26.
- Read the story of the Suhoor drum by Abdul Hakim Qassem, Creativity, June 1987 Issue 6, Fifth Year 20–28.
- Madness and pretending to be mad at Shakespeare, Pens (Iraq) Issue 3–4, March–April 1987, 68–77.
- Dream, chemistry and writing read in the diwan of you and one of them, and your members scattered the poet Mohammed Afi Matar, Chapters of October 1986, Volume 9, Issue 1 and 2, 160–190.
- Legendary features in the novel Cairo Distances (Egyptian) May 1988 Issue 410, 49–83.
- Youssef Idris: An initial attempt to understand the Egyptian character in his novels (Egypt) 1998, Issue 15, 21 86.
- The language of the dream and legend in the poetry of the 1970s in Egypt (A.M. Comparative Rhetoric Journal) (Egypt), 1991, Issue 11, 52–99.
- Heron: Movement and Crossing barriers (in the Book of Arrow and Shihab, studies in the story and novel of the author) Al-Rafii Publications: Tanta Egypt 1986.
- Dead birds and the dream in the direction of suffocation (read in the group Watch Out Cairo) in the book Arrow and Shihab of the author.
- Reading in the bitter tongue of Abdul Wahab al-Aswani (in the Book of Arrow and Shihab by the author).
- Reality and dreaming in the ugly and the rose of the sweet prophet's neighbor (in the book of the arrow and the shihab of the author).
- Signs of exile and proof in the stories of Ismail Adly, New Culture (Egypt) Issue 15 April 1988, 112–119.
- Naguib Mahfouz Creative, Al-Arabi Kuwait 188.
- Semantics of the place in the stories of Abdullah al-Tawi (presented at the Dubai Forum symposium in Oman during 1992).
- Death and dream in the world of Baha tahir, Chapters 12,1993, 180–203.
- Awareness of the place and its implications in the stories of Muhammad al-Omari Chapters 13, 1995,4,13 236249.
- Visual thinking and day and night dreams (read in the other town of Ibrahim Abdel Majid in the new culture).
- The geography of illusion and the history of reality read in the phone of Jamal Al-Gheitani Cairo 1996.
- The Labyrinth and the Mysterious Destiny (Read in the World of Muhammad al-Saati) New Culture October 1995, Issue 85, 36–51.
- Celebratory realism in the rise and collapse of al-Mustajab, creativity of February 1996.
- Women's Creativity and Men's Creativity Magazine Arab Kuwait March 1996, 170–173.
- Presence manifested throughout various parts (reading in the story of the passions of mirrors for the roles of the maps) chapters 1996.
- A passing dream and a resident body (reading in the models of poetry Abdel Moneim Ramadan Abdel Moneim) chapters 1996.
- Places of sound, silence, shadow and absence, read in a statement of absence to Victor Al-Qafash (1999).
- Emile Habibi. You're the remaining treasure. Literature News, Issue 12,148 May 1996.
- Tomb symbolism in the hymn of the house by Youssef Abu Reh (1999).
- Read in diwan before the end of the scene to Seery Hassan, New Culture 1996.
- Reading in The Cowards' Novel by Rachid Ghamri, News of Literature, 2010.

=== Studies in fine art ===
- The Creative Vision of Anthony Toni, Saudi Manhal February 1995, 39–42.
- Henri Matisse's Creative Vision, February 1985, 90–91.
- Creative Vision at Art Of Gooch, Al-Manhal, April 1985, 48–50.
- Guernica: Picasso's most famous works of art, Arab Horizons (Iraq) May 1985 96-102.
- Paul Kly's Creative Vision, September 1985, 44–48.
- Van Gogh Letters, Kuwait Magazine, May 1987, Issue 57, 92–97.
- Picasso's Creative Vision, Al-Manhal, January 1990, 4.7
- Why did Van Gogh cut off his ear? Lines, 1997, June 66–67.
- A series of studies on some Egyptian artists, especially Hamed Nada, Hamed Abdullah, Mahmoud Tabba and others.

=== Studies in cinema ===
- Reality and beyond reality in the new Egyptian cinema, Cairo 1997, March 172–184.
- Making stars, 7th Art Magazine Cairo January 1998.

=== Public articles written and translated ===
- Lessons on creativity in poetry (translated by the poet Paul Qalyiri) Al-Manhal (Saudi Arabia) January 1985, 110–114.
- Creativity in Poetry (translated by the poet Stephen Sbender) Al-Manhal, January 1987, 184–187.
- Sekulow Interpretation of Creativity, Al-Manhal, September 1987, 28–32.
- Reflections on Writing (translated essay by American novelist Henry Miller) Al-Manhal, October 1987, 36–39.
- Public Opinion (Idea and History, Arab Horizons (Iraq) August 1986,58-67.
- Creative Focus Operations, Al-Manhal, September 1989, 32–37.
- Creativity and self-realization, August 1990, 136–152.
- Interview with Chomsky (translated dialogue by De Kohn) Journal of Psychology (Egypt) First Issue January 1987.
- The relationship between creativity and drug use, Al Arabi Kuwait, January 1998.

=== Discussions ===
- Between Psychology and Literature in Egypt, Arab Journal of Humanities (Kuwait), Volume 5, 17th Issue, 1985, 174–190.
- New sensibility (semantics of the term among the general) new culture (Egypt) September 1987, 21–27.

=== Dialogues ===
- Face-to-face: Interview with Dr. Mustafa Suef Al-Arabi Kuwait, April 1985, 56–70.
- Dialogue with The Roles of The Kharat on Story, Art and Creativity, January 1988, 80–87.

=== Presentations or book reviews ===
- Presentation of the Book of Women Between Home and Work by Mohammed Salama Adam, Arab Journal of Humanities Kuwait, 10th Volume III, 1983, 307–313.
- Presentation of a reference book in clinical psychology by Mustafa Suef et al. The Journal of Social Sciences Kuwait Volume XIII, 4th Issue 1985, 497–503.
- Presentation of the Book of Man and its symbols by Carl Gustav Young, translated by Samir Alli, Magazine of Social Sciences Kuwait Volume 14, Second Issue 1986, 314–317.
- Presentation of the Book of Genius, Creativity and Leadership by Dr. Simonton, The Creativity of Egypt magazine in the tenth year of July 1992.
- Presentation of the Book of Creativity and Disease by Sanblom, Al-Arabi Kuwait Magazine, January 1993.
- Presentation of the Book of The Psychology of The Unconscious Journal of Al-Arabi, Kuwait, 1996.

== Death ==
He died on Thursday, March 18, 2021, in Giza, after contracting COVID-19 during the COVID-19 pandemic in Egypt. He was 68.
