= Emad Abu Ghazi =

Egyptian professor of archival studies

Emad Badr El-Din Mahmoud Abu Ghazy
- عماد بدر الدين محمود أبو غازي

Minister of Culture
- In office 5 March 2011 – 7 December 2011
- Prime Minister: Essam Sharaf
- Preceded by: Farouk Hosny
- Succeeded by: Shaker Abdel Hamid

Personal details
- Born: 3 January 1955 (age 71) Cairo, Egypt
- Spouse: Bothaina Kamel
- Relations: Badr Al Din Abu Ghazi (father)
- Children: Mariam Abu Ghazi
- Education: University of Cairo

Emad Abu Ghazi (Arabic: عماد أبو غازي; born 3 January 1955) is an Egyptian professor of archival studies at the University of Cairo, who is a former minister of culture of Egypt. He has also worked as the secretary general of the supreme council of culture in Egypt.

== Early life and education ==
Abu Ghazi was born in the Egyptian city of Cairo in 1955. His parents were former minister of culture Badr Al Din Abu Ghazi and artist Reaya Helmi. His father's uncle was Egypt's leading sculptor Mahmoud Mokhtar.

He graduated from El-Kawmeya school then entered the faculty of arts in the University of Cairo, where he specialized in archival studies. He received his bachelor's degree in 1982, his master's degree in 1988 and his doctorate in 1995.
