= Nabiha Lotfy =

Egyptian film director and cineast (1937–2015)

- Born: 28 January 1937
- Citizenship: Egypt, Lebanon
- Occupation(s): Film director, Filmmaker, Actor

Nabiha Lotfy (January 28, 1937 – June 17, 2015) was a Lebanese-born actor and film director.

She was born in Sidon and attended the American University of Beirut before moving to Cairo. There, she attended the Cairo Higher Institute of Cinema, graduating in 1964. She helped establish the Association of Egyptian Women Filmmakers in 1990.

She produced more than a dozen documentaries and almost 50 feature films. Latfy was named to the National Order of the Cedar in 2006.

She died in a hospital in Cairo after an illness of several months.

== Selected filmography ==
- Aal Yaal
- Prayer in Old Cairo (1971)
- Mohammad Ali Street (1989)
- Karioka
