= Higher Institute of Ballet =

The Higher Institute of Ballet is one of the institutes of art at the Academy of Arts in Giza, Egypt.

== Establishment ==
Established in 1962, Higher Institute of Ballet is a technical institute affiliated with the Ministry of Culture, issued in that Presidential Decree No. 1439 was issued for the year 1959. Law No. 78 of 1969 and became a component of the Institute of the Academy of Arts under this law. Magda Saleh served as the school's dean in 1983, having previously been a student at the Institute.

== Performances ==
Students of the school have performed many of the ballets from the traditional classical ballet repertoire such as The Nutcracker, Giselle, Don Quixote, Les Sylphides, Swan Lake and others, and also participated in international competitions and festivals in addition to the Cairo Opera Ballet Company.

== Professors ==
- Ahlam Younes
