= Ahmed El-Nahass =

Egyptian film director

- Born: January 10, 1950; Egypt
- Died: 2023 (aged 72–73)
- Education: Cairo Higher Institute of Cinema
- Occupation: Director

Ahmed El-Nahass (Arabic: احمد النحاس, born in 1950, died in 2023) is an Egyptian movie director.

El-Nahass worked for many year with the biggest names in the Egyptian cinema field, like Kamal El Sheikh and Al-Zurkani. His first movie was The Lost Plane (Arabic: الطائرة المفقوده), which won an award at Alexandria's movie festival.
