= Tharwat Okasha =

Egyptian Minister of Culture during the Nasserite era

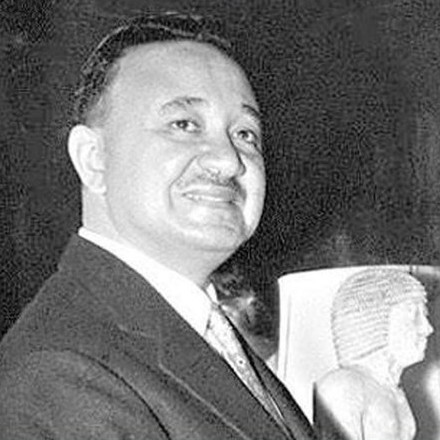
Tharwat Okasha

Tharwat Okasha (also spelt Sarwat Okasha, Arabic: ثروت عكاشة; 1921–27 February 2012) was an Egyptian writer, translator and influential Minister of Culture during the Nasserite era, and is known as the "founder of Egypt's cultural institutions."

== Biography ==
Tharwat Okasha was an army officer involved in the Free Officers Movement, along with former president Nasser and his comrades, which toppled King Farouk of Egypt from his crown in what is known as the 23 July Revolution of 1952. As a child of an aristocratic family, Okasha received a good education, read books in foreign languages, and learned music very early on at home. This background made him the most cultured and enlightened officer among his group of army officers.

Okasha received his PhD in literature from Sorbonne in the 1960s and worked as visiting scholar at the Collège de France. He published more than 70 books, including his three-volume memoir titled My Memoirs in Politics and Culture, which is considered a rich resource for historians of the Nasserite era; as well as a 38-volume encyclopedia of arts titled The Eye Listens and the Ear Sees.

Okasha served as the military attaché at the Embassy of Egypt in Paris. He was appointed Minister of Culture in the late 1950s by President Nasser. Okasha held the position twice, from 1958 to 1962, and again from 1966 to 1970. In his first term Okasha replaced Fathi Radwan in the post on 7 October 1958 and was succeeded by Mohammed Abdul Qader on 27 September 1962. Okasha's second term began on 10 September 1966, and he was in office until 18 November 1970 when Badr Al Din Abu Ghazi was named minister of culture.

During his terms in ministerial posts, he founded many cultural institutions that are still functioning and considered major Egyptian landmarks. For example, he founded the High Council for Culture and Arts (now called the Supreme Council for Culture), the General Egyptian Book Organisation and, most importantly, the Arts Academy.

== Works ==
=== Books and studies ===
- Encyclopedia of the History of Art. The Listening Eye, the Seeing Ear:
1. Ancient Egyptian Art: Architecture (1971).
2. Ancient Egyptian Art: Sculpture and Painting (1972).
3. Ancient Egyptian Art: Alexandrian and Coptic Art (1976).
4. Ancient Iraqi Art (1974).
5. Religious Islamic and Arab Painting (1978).
6. Islamic Persian and Turkish Painting (1983).
7. Greek Art (1981).
8. Ancient Persian Art (1989).
9. Renaissance Art: Renaissance, Baroque and Rococo (1988).
10. Roman art (1991).
11. Byzantine Art (1992).
12. Art of the Middle Ages (1992).
13. Painting in Islamic Moghol India (1995).
- Time and the Melody Songs: from Apollo's Songs to Turangalila (1980).
- Aesthetic Values in Islamic Architecture (1981).
- Greeks Between Mythology and Innovation (1978).
- Michelangelo (1980).
- Miraj Nameh (1981).
- Al-Wasiti's Art through Al-Hariri's Maqamat (1999).
- Dictionary of the Cultural Idioms.
- Cautious Fond of Wagner (1975).
- Modern Man Crowning Ramses' Era (1971).
- Hurricane from the East or Genghis Khan (1952).
- Egypt in the Eyes of Outsiders (1984).
- My Memoirs in Politics and Culture (1988).
- Series of lectures at Collège de France in 1973.

=== Translations ===
Okasha translated many books into Arabic, including:

- The works of the poet Ovid, such as Amores and Metamorphoses.
- The works of Kahlil Gibran, such as The Prophet.
- Le théâtre égyptien, by Étienne Drioton (1967).
- The Perfect Wagnerite, by George Bernard Shaw (1965).
- Back to the Faith, by Henry Nick (1950).
- Mr. Adam, by Pat Frank (1948).
- The Bishop's Jaegers, by Thorne Smith (1952).
- Machine Warfare, by J. F. C. Fuller (1942).

=== Important achievements in the field of culture and heritage ===
- The International Campaign to Save the Monuments of Nubia.
- The Institutes of Ballet, Music, and Cinematography; later amalgamated into the Academy of Arts.
- The Egyptian National Library and Archives (Dar al-Kutub).
- Cultural Palaces.
- The Cairo Opera Ballet Company.
- Sound and light shows at the pyramids of Giza, the Citadel of Saladin (Cairo), and the Karnak Temple Complex.
- The Giza Solar Boat Museum.
