= Nadia Salem =

Egyptian filmmaker (born 1946)

- Born: 23 September 1946.
- Citizenship: Egypt
- Education: Higher Institute of Cinema
- Occupation: Filmmaker

Nadia Salem (born 1946) is an Egyptian filmmaker.

== Life ==
Nadia Salem was born 23 September 1946. She graduated in journalism from the Faculty of Arts in Cairo in 1969, and from the directing section of the Cairo Higher Cinema Institute in 1979. She then joined the national Film Centre, where she directed several documentaries.

== Films ==
- The Doorman is at Your Service / Saheb El Edara Bawab El Omara, 1985
