= Badr Al Din Abu Ghazi =

Egyptian art critic and politician (1920–1983)

Minister of Culture
- In office 18 November 1970 – 14 May 1971
- President: Gamal Abdel Nasser
- Preceded by: Tharwat Okasha
- Succeeded by: Ismail Ghanem

Personal details
- Born: 1920
- Died: 1983 (aged 62–63)
- Children: Emad Abu Ghazi

Badr Al Din Abu Ghazi (1920–1983) was an Egyptian art critic and writer who served as the minister of culture between 1970 and 1971.

== Biography ==
Abu Ghazi was born in 1920. He was a nephew of the leading Egyptian sculptor Mahmoud Mokhtar.

Abu Ghazi was an art critic by profession and worked at various publications. He started his career at Al Fossoul which was published by Mohamed Zaki Abdel Kader. In the early 1950s he joined the publications Rose Al Yusuf and Al Akhbar. Then he worked for Al Hilal and for Al Majalla. The editor of the latter was Yahya Haqqi in the 1960s. In addition to such journalist activities Abu Ghazi was one of the members of the Supreme Council for Arts, Literature, and Social Science in the 1960s.

On 18 November 1970 Abu Ghazi was appointed minister of culture replacing Tharwat Okasha in the post. Abu Ghazi's term ended on 14 May 1971 when Ismail Ghanem was named the minister of culture. Then Abu Ghazi served as the head of an art institution in Egypt, namely Société des amis de l’art, from 1972 to 1983.

His son, Emad Abu Ghazi, also served as the minister of culture in the cabinet led by Prime Minister Essam Sharaf in 2011. Abu Ghazi died in 1983.

=== Books ===
Abu Ghazi published various books one of which was about the Egyptian sculptor Mahmoud Mokhtar. This book is cited as the most comprehensive study on Mokhtar. Abu Ghazi also published another book on Mokhtar which was translated into French in 1949.
