= Cairo Opera Ballet Company =

Ballet company and school in Egypt

General information
- Name: Cairo Opera Ballet Company
- Year founded: 1958; 68 years ago
- Founders: Tharwat Okasha, Leonid Lavrovsky
- Principal venue: Cairo Opera House

Senior staff
- Chief executive: Erminia Gambarelli Kamel

Other
- Parent company: Higher Institute of Ballet

The Cairo Opera Ballet Company is the resident ballet company of the Cairo Opera House and a ballet school affiliated to Egypt's Higher Institute of Ballet. Its foundation began in 1958 during the presidency of Gamal Abdel Nasser through the efforts of Tharwat Okasha, Egypt's culture minister at the time, and Leonid Lavrovsky, the former artistic director of the Bolshoi Ballet, who took a group of Egyptian dancers to Russia for two years of training. At the time of its founding, it was the only resident classical ballet company in Egypt and the Middle East. The Company director was Enayat Azmi.

With a ballet school established, the company staged its first ballet production, The Fountain of Bakhshisarai, at the Khedivial Opera House in 1966. President Nasser himself attended the ballet and awards were presented to the company's management, lead dancers Abdel Moneim Kamel and Aleya Abdel Razek. The company performed a full range of ballets from the classical ballet repertoire including Don Quixote, Paquita, Giselle, Swan Lake, Le Corsaire and Scheherazade. In 1969 the Company hosted the Royal Ballet for a performance of Swan Lake at Giza pyramid complex in Giza.

The destruction of the Khedivial Opera House by fire in 1971, followed by President Anwar Sadat severing Egypt's ties with Russia in 1972, led to a serious decline of the company. The company and its ballet school had a resurgence following the construction of the new Cairo Opera House in 1988.

Since 2004, Erminia Gambarelli Kamel has been the company's artistic director. Trained at the La Scala Theatre Ballet School, Kamel joined the Cairo Opera Ballet Company as a principal dancer in 1982.
