= Abdellah Mesbahi =

Moroccan film director (1936–2016)

- Born: 1936; El Jadida
- Citizenship: Morocco
- Occupation: Film director

Abdellah Mesbahi (born 1936 in El Jadida, died September 16, 2016) was a Moroccan filmmaker.

== Biography ==
Mesbahi studied cinema at the École supérieure d'études cinématographiques (ESEC) in Paris and before a stint as an intern at the Théâtre national populaire. Upon his return to Morocco, he held administrative positions at the Ministry of Information and the Moroccan Film Center (CCM). Throughout his career, Mesbahi directed 21 feature films, many of them shedding light on a number of national, Arab and Islamic causes, in particular the Israeli–Palestinian conflict. His film on the Russian occupation of Afghanistan, Afghanistan Why? was censored in 1984.

His daughter Imane is also a filmmaker.

== Partial filmography ==
- 1968: Vaincre Pour Vivre (Intissar El Hayat)
- 1973 : Silence, sens interdit (Sukut al-ittiah al-mamnu)
- 1975: Tomorrow the Earth will not Change (Demain la terre ne changera pas)
- 1976 : Green Light (Al-daw' al-akhdar)
- 1979 : Where Are You Hiding the Sun?
- 1983 : Afghanistan Why?
- 1989: The Land of Challenge / Ardhu-l tahaddy (also known under the original title of 1980 I Will Write Your Name in The Sand)
- 2010 : Al Qods Bab Al Maghariba
