= Gaber Asfour =

Egyptian academic and politician (1944–2021)

- جابر عصفور
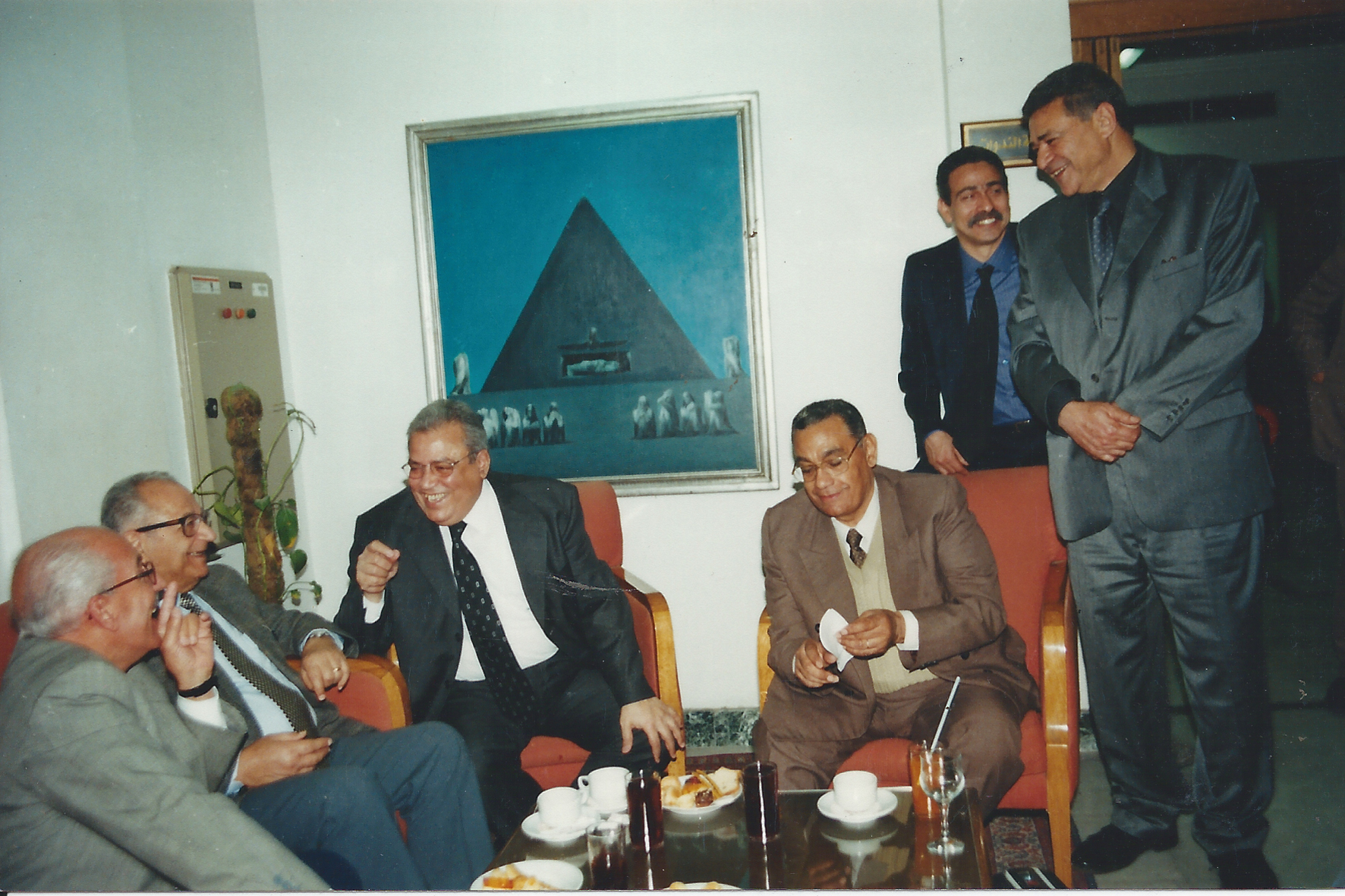

Minister of Culture of Egypt
- In office 17 June 2014 – 5 March 2015
- In office 1 February 2011 – 9 February 2011
- Preceded by: Farouk Hosny
- Succeeded by: Abdel-Wahed El-Nabawi

Personal details
- Born: 25 March 1944 El-Mahalla El-Kubra, Egypt
- Died: 31 December 2021 (aged 77)
- Party: National Democratic Party
- Education: Cairo University

Gaber Ahmed Asfour (Arabic: جابر أحمد عصفور, IPA: [ˈɡæːbeɾ ʕɑsˤˈfuːɾ]; 25 March 1944 – 31 December 2021) was an Egyptian academic and politician who was a professor at Cairo University from 1966. He was appointed the Minister of Culture on 1 February 2011. He had published Countering Fanaticism, Times of the Novel and In Defense of the Enlightenment, among others.

During the 2011 Egyptian protests, he was appointed minister of culture, but he resigned after only one week in office, citing health problems as the reason for his resignation. Asfour died on 31 December 2021, at the age of 77.

== Awards ==
- Best Book for Critical Study Award, Ministry of Culture – Cairo (1984).
- Best Book in Literary Studies Award, Kuwait Foundation for the Advancement of Science, Kuwait (1985).
- Best Book in Human Studies Award, Cairo International Book Fair (1995).
- Tunisian Cultural Medal from the President of the Republic of Tunisia (October 1995).
- Sultan Bin Ali Al Owais Award in Literary and Critical Studies – Fifth Session (1996-1997).
- Shield of the Arab Women's League (March 8, 2003).
- Gaddafi International Prize (First Session) (2009).
- Nile Award (2019).
