= Sulafa Jadallah =

Palestinian filmmaker

- سلافة جاد الله
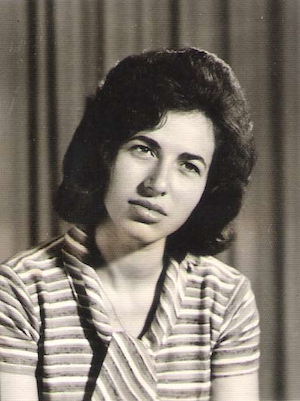
- Born: 1941; Nablus
- Died: 2002 (aged 60–61); Damascus
- Education: Cairo Higher Institute of Cinema
- Occupation: Cinematographer

Sulafa Jadallah (1941–2002) was the first Palestinian woman to work in film production.

Born in Nablus in 1941, she developed a passion for photography at an early age. Sulafa studied cinematography at the Higher Institute of Cinema in Giza. She was the first Arab woman to become a cinematographer.

== Career ==
In 1967, Sulafa founded a small photography unit in her apartment. Her equipment was primitive, and she used her kitchen as a laboratory for developing photographs. Her work focused mostly on documenting photos of Palestinian martyrs in the aftermath of the Naksa.

In 1968, she co-founded the Palestinian Film Unit (PFU). The PFU worked as the official photography department of the Palestinian Liberation Organization. The PFU produced films that documented the events of the Arab-Israeli war, using footage from demonstrations, public gatherings, and other cultural and political events.

Sulafa worked on the PFU's first film, No to a Peaceful Solution, released in 1968. Filmed in Jordan, the film documents Palestinian protests against the Rogers Plan.

In 1969, Sulafa was shot in the head while filming. She was paralyzed as a result of the injury, but she was able to continue working as a cinematographer. Sulafa passed away in Damascus in 2002 at the age of 61. The Shashat Women's Film Festival in Palestine (2005–2013) created the "Sulafa Jadallah Annual Film Award" in her honor, recognizing her contributions to women's cinema.
