= Imane Mesbahi =

Moroccan actress and filmmaker (born 1964)

- Born: 1964 (age 61–62); Tetouan
- Education: Cairo's Higher Institute of Cinema; Ain Chams University
- Occupation: Actress . filmmaker

Imane Mesbahi (born 1964 in Tetouan) is a Moroccan actress and filmmaker.

== Biography ==
As a child, Mesbahi starred in the first two feature films directed by her father, renowned filmmaker Abdellah Mesbahi. In the 1980s she directed several short films and studied directing at Cairo's Higher Institute of Cinema, and psychology at Ain Chams University. In 1994 she started making her first feature film, Paradis des pauvres, which was released eight years later.

She is currently General Secretary of the Moroccan Chamber of Film Distributors.

== Filmography ==
=== Feature films ===
- Paradis des pauvres (2002)

=== Short films ===
- Traces sur l'eau (Traces on the Water)
- Une femme dans le tourbillon de la vie (A Woman in the Whirl of Life)
- Une femme mal à l’aise (An Uneasy Woman)
