= Beni Suef Cultural Palace fire =

2005 fire in Egypt

- Date: 5 September 2005
- Location: Egypt
- Deaths: 46
- Injuries: 0

The Beni Suef Cultural Palace fire occurred in Beni Suef, Egypt, on September 5, 2005, and killed 46 people.

The Cultural Palace was overcrowded at the occasion of the Amateur Theatre Festival when a burning candle lit paper scenery on the stage and started a conflagration. A stampede erupted towards a single exit. Fire extinguishing equipment was locked in a distant room, and fire engines and ambulances arrived late and unprepared People died both from burns and in the crowd crush.

In the aftermath the Minister of Culture, Farouk Hosni, resigned, a move that was later revoked by President Hosni Mubarak. In May 2006, eight cultural bureaucrats were convicted for negligence and received 10-year prison sentences.

The fire drastically affected the theatrical community of Egypt who had come to the Cultural Palace on that day for the festival. September 5 has been named the National Day of Theatre in remembrance.
