= Diaa Rashwan =

Egyptian politician (born 1960)

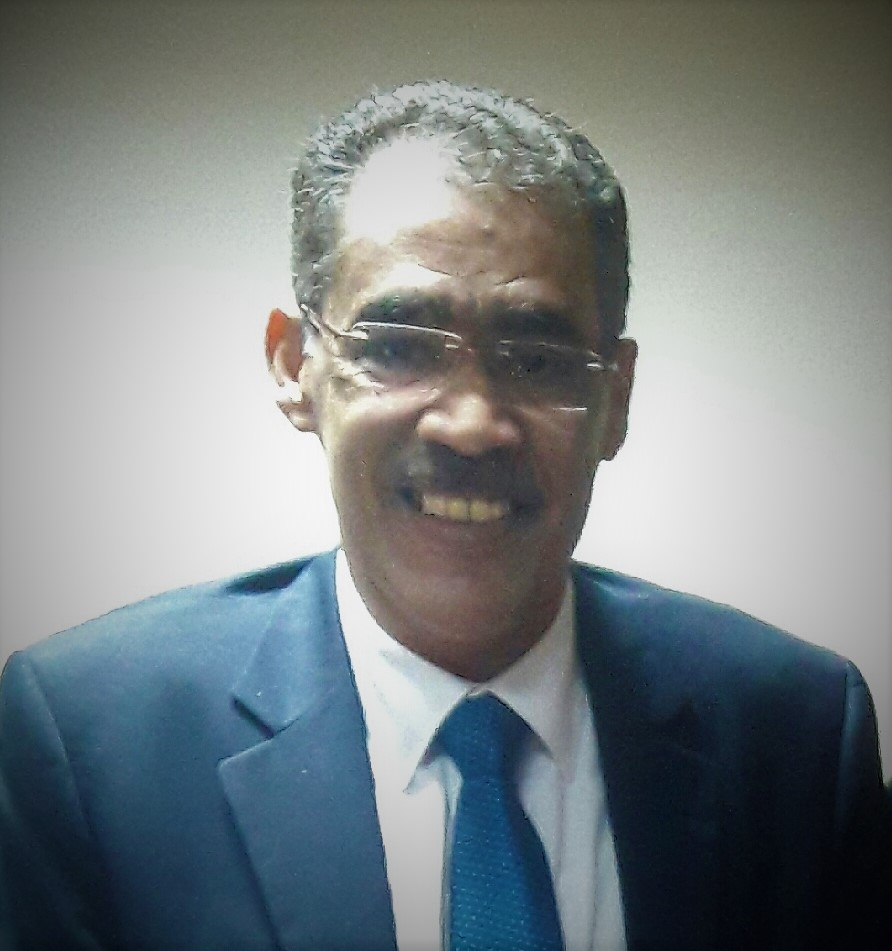
Diaa Rashwan

Diaa Rashwan (Arabic: ضياء رشوان, born 1 January 1960) is an Egyptian journalist, politician and the current Minister of Information, Rashwan graduated from Cairo University in 1981 with a Bachelor's degree in political science from Cairo University, he also received a Master's degree in the same field from the Paris based Sorbonne University in 1985.

Rashwan began his career in Al-Ahram Center for Political and Strategic Studies in the early 1980s as a researcher and has been an expert scholar over there since then and many years later in 2011 he became the Director of the Center.

== Biography ==
Rashwan was a dissident during the Mubarak era, and a founding member of Kefaya movement which was the seed of the 2011 revolution. Rashwan is also a member of the board of trustees of the Egyptian Organization for Human Rights since the 1980s. In 2010 he nominated himself in the parliamentary elections against the candidate of the ruling National Democratic Party contesting the seat of Armant, however he lost to the NDP candidate due to widespread rigging of the elections by Mubarak's government.

In March 2013 Rashwan was elected president of the Egyptian Press Syndicate however he failed to secure a reelection for a second term. As chief of the Press Syndicate, Rashwan strongly opposed the Muslim Brotherhood-led government of president Mohamed Morsi, and was an ardent supporter of the June 2013 protests that led to Morsi's subsequent overthrow in July that year. Rashwan was chosen to be appointed to the 50-member constitution committee during the second transitional period to draft Egypt's current constitution. The constitution was later approved by popular referendum in January 2014. In June 2017 Rashwan was appointed by President el-Sisi as Chairman of the State Information Service and later that year he was appointed as a member of the Supreme Council for Combating Terrorism and Extremism. In March 2019 Rashwan once again became president of the press syndicate after being elected by a landslide while retaining his position as senior government official which drew the criticism of some observers.

In April 2022 the Egyptian president declared his intention to hold a national dialogue in Egypt under the auspices of the National Training Academy that will include all political parties including most of the secular opposition forces and all segments of Egyptian civil society. In June of the same year Diaa Rashwan was selected as the General coordinator of the National Dialogue in his capacity as both the Chairman of SIS and The President of the Press Syndicate.

Rashwan couldn't run in March 2023 Egyptian association of journalists elections due to the 2 consecutive term limit stipulated by the law. Khaled Al-Balshy a dissident leftist journalist won the elections beating the pro government candidate Khaeld Meery.

On the 10th of February 2026, Diaa Rashwan was appointed as State Minister of Information by President Sisi as part of a cabinet reshuffle. Rashwan retained his position as Chairman of the State Information Service as well.

Rashwan comes from a political family, his father Youssef Rashwan was a member of the Egyptian parliament representing the district of Armant in Upper Egypt.
