= Safwat El-Sherif =

Egyptian politician (1933–2021)

Mohamed Safwat El Sherif
- محمد صفوت الشريف
- Born: 19 December 1933; Gharbia Governorate, Kingdom of Egypt
- Died: 13 January 2021 (aged 87); Cairo, Egypt

Mohamed Safwat El Sherif (Arabic: محمد صفوت الشريف; 19 December 1933 – 13 January 2021) was an Egyptian politician who served as chairman of the State Information Service, minister of information, speaker of the Egyptian Shura Council, and secretary general of the ruling National Democratic Party, and head of the Supreme Press Council.

El Sherif held a B.A. degree in military sciences, as well as a multitude of intelligence, information, and communication-based degrees and studies. El Sherif is regarded as one of the longest serving politicians in Egyptian history, serving as minister of information from 1982 to 2004.

== Biography ==
Mohamed Safwat Yousef El Sherif was born on 19 December 1933 in Gharbia Governorate. He graduated with a bachelor's degree in military sciences in 1952. Safwat El Sherif was married to Ikbal Mohamed Atteya Halabi with two sons and a daughter. He was granted an honorary Ph.D. from Barrington University (USA) in applied information and communication sciences. He also concluded his military studies at Armed Forces Institutes in the fields of planning, management and communication.

He excelled at post-graduate studies in the International Communication and Public Opinion at the Strategic Studies Institute and completed courses in means of mass communication in the British Information Service in addition to another course at the International Communication Institute in Federal Germany.

In 1957, he was transferred to the General Intelligence Service GIS, where he is regarded as one of the founders of the recruitment department as the service was newly established. He recruited and trained officers for that department. In 1968, he was placed under house arrest during an investigation of Intelligence deviation. However, he was cleared of all charges and was considered a witness to events under investigation. Following the proceedings of the investigation and his clearance of all charges, El Sherif chose a more civilian lifestyle and opened his own private business.

As part of the construction and initiation of the intelligence arm for a prominent Gulf state, El Sherif was summoned to serve as a consultant for the operation, a selection attributed to his vast knowledge in the field and strong ties within intelligence circles. Upon the personal request of President Anwar El Sadat, El Sherif was asked to remain and serve in Egypt and turn down the Gulf state's offer, and to provide his services to the current administration.

In 1975, El Sherif dismantled his profitable import and export business to join the State Information Service (SIS). He ascended in leading positions in the SIS from 1975 to 1978. He served as chairman of the SIS from 1978 to 1980. Late president Anwar El-Sadat then appointed him president of the Egyptian Radio and Television Union in 1980. In 1982, he was appointed by former president Hosni Mubarak to be minister of information until 2004.

In 1977, El Sherif - among others - founded the National Democratic Party (NDP) and since then has been a member of the Political Bureau of the NDP. He was also the Rapporteur of Information Committee of the NDP. In 1977, he became Secretary of the NDP for Qasr el Nile constituency. And in 1982 he became NDP Information Secretary as well as a member of NDP General Secretariat. In 1989, he became a member of the NDP Political Bureau. In 1990 he became Assistant Secretary General of the NDP.

On 20 April 1993, El-Sherif escaped an assassination attempt by Al-Gamaa Al-Islamiya (Islamic militant group) with few injuries.

El Sherif was widely regarded as a pioneer in the fields of media, communications & information in the Arab region. He conceptualized and founded the Egyptian Media Production City (EMPC), also known as the 6th of October Media City. He also founded the Egyptian Satellite Company (Nilesat) in 1996 with the purpose of operating Egyptian Satellites. His forward-thinking attitude and laying the foundations of these progressive mega-projects have earned him a title of "Knight of Arab Media" (فارس الاعلام العربي).

== Career in politics ==
El Sherif had a long career in politics. He started as member of the Muslim Brotherhood group before the 1952 revolution when he was still a high school and military academy student. He then moved to the new party of Masr Alfatah after the 1952 revolution. This party was the ruling political party. During the following years the party's name changed from one political stage to the other but he kept the membership till it became the National Democratic party.

In 2001, he was member of NDP Developing Committee and as of September 2002 he became NDP Secretary-General. Since 2004 El-Sherif held the position of Speaker of the Shura Council and the president of the Supreme Press Council till he resigned from NDP on 29 January 2011. He was later accused of killing youth on 2 February but the court acquitted him of all charges.

In September 2020, the Cassation Court upheld a 3-year prison sentence against him and a $6.3m fine.

== Death ==
On 13 January 2021, he died from COVID-19.

== Qualifications and studies ==
- BA in Military Sciences
- Honorary PhD for Excellence in Applications of Communication Sciences from Barrington University (Currently: University of Atlanta)
- Military studies in communication planning and management in military institutes
- Post-Graduate studies in International Communication and Public Opinion in the Institute for Strategic Studies
- Courses in Mass Communication in the British State Information Service
- Courses at the International Communications Institute in Germany

== Political and party work ==
- A founding member of the National Democratic Party (NDP) - 1977
- Media Rapporteur at the National Democratic Party
- Secretary of Qasr El Nile constituency at the National Democratic Party - 1977
- Member of the Shoura Council - 1980
- Media Secretary at the National Democratic Party - 1982
- Member of the General Secretariat of the National Democratic Party - 1982
- Member of the Political Bureau of the National Democratic Party - 1989
- Assistant Secretary Manager of the National Democratic Party & Information Secretary - 1990
- Planning and organization of all media campaigns for all elections and referendums for the National Democratic Party
- Member of the Committee on the Development of the National Democratic Party - 2001
- Secretary General of the National Democratic Party - 2002
- Speaker of the Shoura Council - 2004
- President of the Supreme Press Council - 2006

== Past occupations ==
- Member of the Military Forces (Egyptian Armed Forces)
- Member of the National Defense Council (Egyptian Intelligence Service) & the Presidency
- Ascended leading positions in the State Information Service (SIS) from 1975 to 1978
- Chairman of the SIS (exceptionally ranked as Minister of Information) from 1978 to 1980
- Head of Radio & Television Union (exceptionally ranked as Minister of Information) from 1980 to 1982
- Minister of Information of Egypt from 1982 to 2004

== Information and media work ==
- Setting the strategy and policies of Egyptian media until 2010
- Initiating and establishing the Egyptian media system on local, national, Arab and international levels
- Introducing Egypt into the era of satellite media by launching the Egyptian Nilesat 101 and Nilesat 102 by virtue of the historical document by President Mubarak in May 1995
- Establishing the largest media project for media production (Egyptian Media Production City), introduced to the world by President Mubarak in May 2002
- Ensuring Egypt's prevalence through launching the first Egyptian satellite channel in Arabic language, the first channel in a foreign language and the first thematic channels group
- Initiator of the educational channels promoting education at distance
- Modernizing the Egyptian media organizations and developing and upgrading technological facilities in Radio and Television and sponsoring Radio and Television Festival and initiator of the Egyptian Media People Day since 1984
- Establishing the International Academy of Media Sciences, inaugurated by President Mubarak in May 2002

== Work papers and views ==
- Media in an Open Sky Era - Media Between Freedom and Ownership
- Egyptian Media Strategy
- Arab Media Strategy
- New African Media System - Philosophy of the Egyptian Media
- Egyptian Media in 20 Years - Women's Image in Media
- Reality of NDP's thought in its 8th Conference in 2002
- The Philosophy of Establishing the Supreme Council for Policies

== Other positions ==
- Chairman of the General Assembly of the Radio & Television Union
- Chairman of the Board of Secretaries of the International Academy for Media Sciences
- Member of the Supreme Council for Child Care
- Member of the Board of Directors of the Egyptian "Al Helal Al Ahmar" Association
- Head of the Egyptian Media Association for Development
- Member of the Supreme Council for Population and Family Planning
- Head of the Conference of African Ministers of Information from 1985 - 1989, and in 1997
- Head of the Conference of Islamic Ministers of Information for two sessions: 1992 & 2003
- Deputy Chairman of the Conference of Ministers of Information of Non-Alignment Countries in the years: 1987, 1989 & 1997

== Awards ==
- The Egyptian Order of Merit of the First Class by the president of the Arab Republic of Egypt
- Legion of Merit of the Great River from Libya
- Badges of Honour and Liberation, Bravery, Evacuation and Mobilization - Egypt
- Order of Merit from the Republic of Central Africa
- National Order of Merit of the Second Class (Grand Officer) from the Republic of France
- Prize of Best Minister of Information in the Middle East from the American University in Cairo in 1998
