= Higher Institute of Cinema =

Film school in Cairo, Egypt

- المعهد العالي للسينما
- Established: 1959
- Location: Giza, Egypt; 30.0036°N 31.1970°E
- Website: www.aoa.edu.eg

The Higher Institute Of Cinema (Note: Also translated as the Cairo Higher Cinema Institute.) (Arabic: المعهد العالي للسينما), also known as the Cairo Higher Institute of Cinema, is a film school in Giza, Egypt. It is one of several institutes making up the Egyptian Academy of Arts. Founded in 1959, it is the oldest film school in the Middle East and Africa.

== History ==
The Higher Institute of Cinema was founded in 1959 by government decree as one of several arts institutes affiliated to the Ministry of Culture. Its first classes began on October 24, 1959. Egyptian actor Mohammed Karim was the first dean of the institute.

In 1969, the Academy of Arts was created by the government, and the Institute of Cinema became one several attached to the academy.

In 1981, the academy underwent a reorganisation.

In 2019, it was decided that a branch of the Academy of Arts would be established in Alexandria, where the new academy would incorporate all of the educational facilities in Princess Faiqa Ahmed Fouad Palace.

In March 2024, it was announced that a decision was awaited regarding the establishment of another campus of the Academy of Arts, including the Higher Institute of Cinema, the Conservatory, the Higher Institute of Theatrical Arts, and the Higher Institute of Ballet, in El-Shorouk, northeast of Cairo.

== Description ==
The Higher Institute of Cinema is part of the Academy of Arts affiliated to the Ministry of Culture.

As of 2019 the institute offered courses for both cinema and television in the following subjects:

- Screenwriting
- Film production
- Directing
- Scene and costume designing
- Cinematography
- Sound design
- Montage (television and film)
- Animation

It offered the following degrees:

- B.A. in cinematic arts, majors in one of the above-mentioned subjects
- Post-graduate diploma in the arts of cinema in one of the above-mentioned subjects
- Master's degree
- Ph.D. in arts or in philosophy of arts in the above-mentioned subjects
- D.A.

== People ==
=== Staff ===
Ahmed Kamel Morsi was head of direction at the Institute. Helmi Halim taught scriptwriting there from 1959 until his death in 1971.

=== Alumni ===
Graduates of the institute include:

- Sulafa Jadallah, the first Palestinian woman to work in film production.
- Ahmed Nader Galal, Egyptian film director.
- Ahmed Mekky, Egyptian actor and director.
- Imane Mesbahi, Moroccan filmmaker and actress.
- Ateyyat El Abnoudy, Egyptian Film director.
