= Farouk Hosny =

Egyptian abstract painter (born 1938)

- فاروق حسني
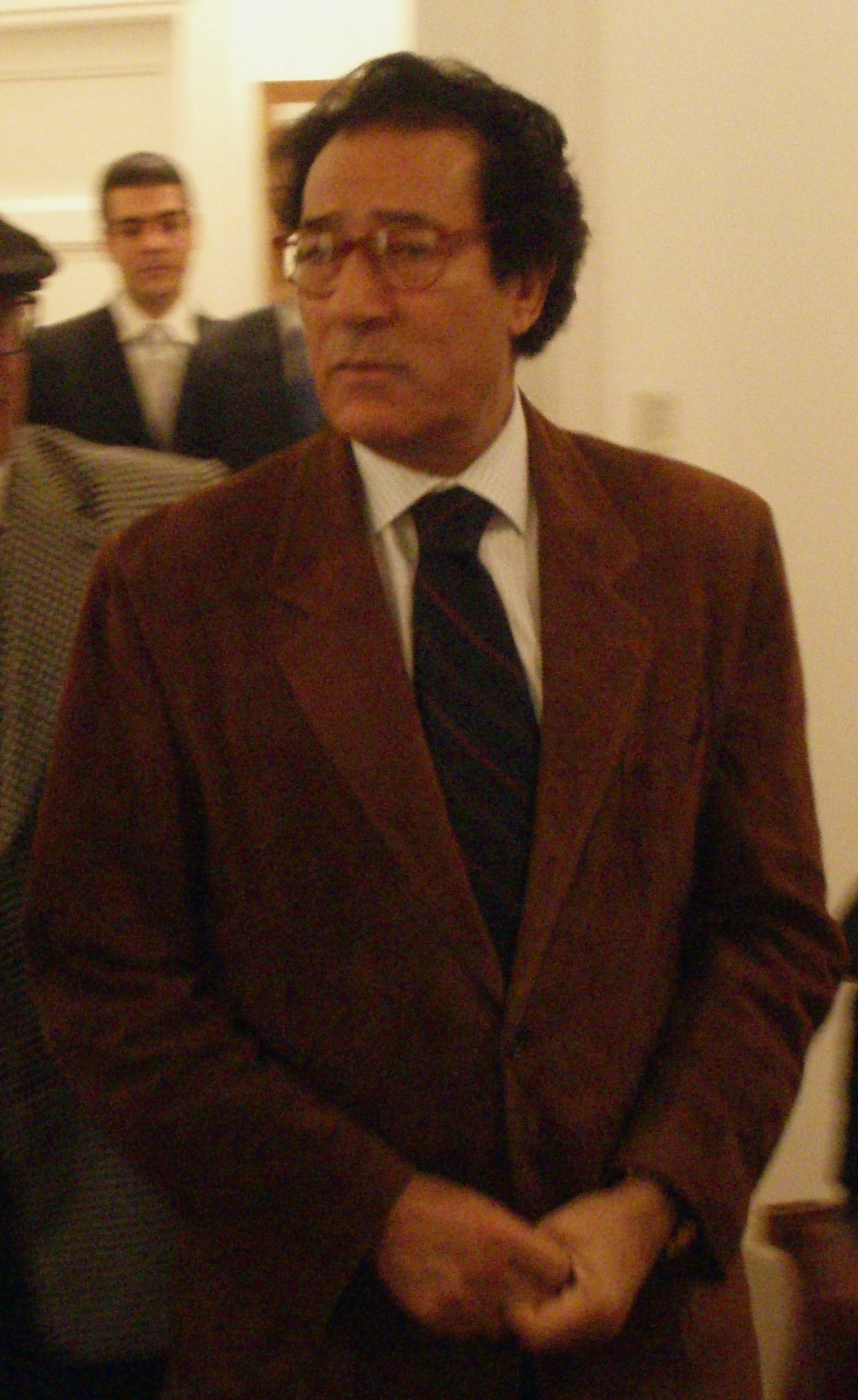
- The Zamalek Art Gallery, 2007
- Born: 1938 (age 87–88); Alexandria, Egypt
- Occupations: Abstract painter, Minister of Culture
- Website: www.faroukhosny.com

Farouk Hosny (or Hosni) (Arabic: فاروق حسنى; born 1938) is an Egyptian abstract painter who was Minister of Culture from 1987 to 2011.

== Early life and career ==
Hosny was born and grew up in Alexandria. He graduated from Alexandria University's School of Fine Arts in 1964 and upon graduation directed the Al-Anfoushi Cultural Palace for several years. An abstract painter, Hosny held exhibitions worldwide and won the Japanese Soka Gakai International University cultural and peace prize.

Between 1971-1978, he was Egypt's cultural attaché in Paris and from 1979 to 1987 served in the same position in Rome, where he also was the director of the Egyptian Academy of Arts.

== Tenure as Minister of Culture in Egypt ==
In 1987, Hosny was appointed the Minister of Culture in Egypt from his position in Rome. During his tenure, he expanded state-run exhibition spaces and initiated various cultural programs, including the Horizon One Gallery, the Palace of Arts, Gezira Arts Center, Alexandria Center of Arts, the Modern Dance Troupe and School, the Cairo History Rehabilitation Project (which included a number of Jewish synagogues), the Nubian Museum in Aswan and the Alexandria National Museum (under construction are the Grand Egyptian Museum and the National Museum of Civilisation in Fustat) and the Cultural Development Fund.

In 2005, Hosny tendered his resignation to President Hosni Mubarak in the wake of the Beni Suef Cultural Palace fire, in which 48 spectators were killed and more injured. Mubarak rejected Hosny's resignation, in response to the pleas of some 400 high-profile intellectuals.

Hosny's term as Minister of Culture ended as a result of the Egyptian revolution of 2011. In March 2011, the interim government of Egypt appointed Cairo University professor Emad Abu Ghazi to the post.

== Career ==
=== Positions ===
- Chairman of Farouk Hosny Foundation for Culture and Arts
- Cultural Animator in the General Department of Fine Arts, Ministry of Culture (1964–1969)
- Director, Anfoushy Cultural Palace, Alexandria (1969–1971)
- Cultural Attaché and Director of the Egyptian Cultural Centre, Paris, France (1971–1978)
- Director of Cultural Administration and Director, Children's Cultural Centre, Cairo, and Technical Advisor to the Minister of Culture (1978–1979)
- Deputy Director, Egyptian Arts Academy, Rome (1979–1982)
- Director, Egyptian Art Academy and Cultural Counselor, Egyptian Embassy, Rome (1982–1987)
- Part-time Professor of Aesthetics at the University of Soka Gakkai, Japan (1993)
- Part-time Professor in the Faculty of Fine Arts, Alexandria University (since 1999)

=== Other ===
- Chairman, The Supreme Council of Antiquities, Egypt
- Chairman, Supreme Council of Culture, Egypt

== Awards ==
- Prize, Cagne-sur-mer Festival, France
- Honorary Ph.D., Soka Gakkai University, Japan, 1993
- Culture and Peace Award, Soka Gakkai University, Japan, 1993
- Mediterranean Arts Award of the Lazio region for 2005
- Mediterranean Sea Award of Arts for 2006
- Grand Audio-Visual Award, International Council of Films, Television and Audio-Visuals, UNESCO Paris, July 2007
- Mediterranean Forum Peace Award, Lecce, Italy, 2008
- Lifetime Achievement Award, Joy Awards, January 2026

== Honors ==
- Grand Cross of the Order of Merit (Egypt)
- Grand Officer of the Order of Merit of the Italian Republic (Italy, 1999)
- Al-Hussein Medal for Excellence (Jordan)
- First Class of the Order of Intellectual Merit (Morocco)

== Criticism ==
=== Hijab controversy ===
In a November 2006 newspaper interview, Hosny criticized the hijab headdress, calling it "regressive." He added that it is "a step backward for Egyptian women," and that "women with their beautiful hair are like flowers and should not be covered up." For his remarks, Hosny came under intense criticism from hardliners, particularly by the Islamist Muslim Brotherhood, and 130 members of the Egyptian Parliament called for his resignation.

=== Censorship ===
Hosny has also censored some media and films, including banning of a heavy metal music concert and arresting its fans, as well as banning the Israeli film The Band's Visit from being screened at the Cairo International Film Festival.

== UNESCO candidacy ==
On July 30, 2007, Egypt nominated Hosny to succeed Koichiro Matsuura as Director-General of the United Nations Educational, Scientific and Cultural Organization (UNESCO) and began a campaign to have him elected to the position. No Arab had previously held the position. Hosni was regarded as certain to win the September 2009 election, but his May 2008 pledge to burn Israel books in Egyptian libraries sparked doubts about his suitability for the position and strengthened opposition to his candidacy. Three Jewish intellectuals and activists—Bernard-Henri Lévy, Claude Lanzmann, and Elie Wiesel—led a campaign to oppose Hosny's election. In a May 2009 open letter to the international community, the three figures decried that Hosny's victory "would be an obvious provocation so transparently contrary to the proclaimed ideals of the UN that UNESCO would not recover." They implored, "We must, without delay, appeal to everyone's conscience to keep UNESCO from falling into the hands of a man who, when he hears the word 'culture,' responds with a book burning." On censorship grounds, Reporters Without Borders also opposed Hosny, stating, "This minister of Hosni Mubarak has been one of the main actors of censorship in Egypt, unfailingly trying to control press freedom as well as citizens' freedom of information."

Despite the opposition, Hosny was still expected to win by a large margin, receiving pledges of support from the Arab League, the Organization of African Unity and the Organisation of the Islamic Conference. Months prior to the UNESCO election, the Israeli government ceased opposition to Hosni's candidacy following a May 2009 meeting between Prime Minister Benjamin Netanyahu and Mubarak. In the West, Mubarak's allies were publicly neutral but behind the scenes worked to diminish Hosni's support.

On September 22, 2009, Hosny lost the UNESCO election in a stunning upset in the fifth and final round of voting to Bulgaria's Irina Bokova, who received 31 votes to Hosni's 27. In the fourth round of voting, the two candidates were tied at 29 votes each. Hosny blamed his defeat on Zionist pressures and a group of influential Jews, possible referring to Lévy, Lanzmann, and Wiesel who strongly opposed him. He criticized the US Ambassador at UNESCO, David Killion, for derailing his election and stated, "The north always has to control the south."

Political offices
Preceded by Ahmed Heikal	Minister of Culture of Egypt; 1987 – 2011	Incumbent
