= Mansour Hassan =

Mansour Hassan منصور حسن

Chairman of the Advisory Council
- In office 8 September 2011 – 8 March 2012

Personal details
- Born: 10 February 1937 Sharqia Governorate, Arab Republic of Egypt
- Died: 22 December 2012 (aged 75)

Mansour Hassan Arabic: منصور حسن, (10 February 1937 – 22 December 2012), was the Chairman of the Advisory Council of Egypt between 8 September 2011 and 8 March 2012 in the transition period that came after the 2011 Egyptian revolution. On 7 March 2012, he announced that he would run for president and appoint former intelligence officer General Sameh Seif Al-Yazal as vice president.

== Life ==
In 1937, Hassan was born to a middle-class family in Sharqiya Governorate, situated north-east of Cairo. His father had invested heavily in his education; he sent him to the elite Victoria College in Alexandria, where many Arab royals and aristocrats enrolled their children.

In the 1950s, Hassan joined Cairo University's Faculty of Commerce, where he specialized in political science. At the time, Cairo University still had no distinct school for political science. Meanwhile, his father had established a pharmaceutical business, which attracted Hassan upon his graduation.

In the 1970s, he tapped into Egypt's highest politics, climbing the official echelons quite fast until establishing himself as one of Sadat's top aides. According to “I knew Sadat,” the memoirs of Sadat's adviser, Mahmoud Gamei, Hassan found his way to Sadat's world while the latter was looking for a young face to lead the new political party that he was about to establish. As he was shifting alliances from the Soviet Bloc to the Western American camp, Sadat had to convince his new allies that he was actually rejuvenating Egypt's political life and embracing democracy.

Back then, Sayed Marei, one of the regime's most influential figures, suggested Hassan, given his distinguished educational background, wrote Gamei. Sadat agreed and Hassan contributed to establishing the National Democratic Party in 1978.

“Mansour Hassan set a different model in practicing politics. He was volunteering, he was not waiting for a car from the government or a salary,” wrote Gamei, adding that Sadat developed full faith in Hassan's political talent and eventually entrusted him with the two ministries, information and culture, in 1979.

In 1981, Sadat added to Mansour's titles “the minister of state for presidential affairs” and gave him the right to read confidential presidential mail.

Last month, Gamei told the local press that by virtue of his new post, Hassan became aware of all top decisions. Meanwhile, Sadat had him attend his meetings with local and foreign officials. Some observers from the time had related Hassan's quick ascent to the backing he received from Sadat's wife, who was quite influential.

Meanwhile, Hassan's prominence had provoked Sadat's vice president — Mubarak — and prompted him to tender his resignation, but Sadat rejected it, according to Gamei.

In the book, published nearly 20 years after Hassan's first appointment, Gadei remembers that Sadat turned against Hassan after a Lebanese magazine had Hassan's photo on its cover captioned, “Egypt’s next man.” Then, Sadat was alarmed by the increasing leverage of his protege. He discharged him from his ministerial and presidential posts and demoted him to deputy speaker of the People's Assembly. But the latter refused the new post, wrote Gamei, Shortly later, Sadat was assassinated and Hassan withdrew completely from politics.

== Career ==
Hassan was a founding member of president Anwar Sadat's National Democratic Party (NDP) in the 1970s. In 1979 he was appointed as Minister of Culture and Information, and as he grew closer to Sadat, was given the Ministry of State for Presidential Affairs (chief of staff) in 1981. However, later that year Sadat issued orders to arrest a large number of political dissidents in what became known as the September Arrests, where Hassan resigned in protest, though one commentator saw he was pressured to resign by then vice president Hosni Mubarak, who saw him as a rival.
