= Academy of Arts (Egypt) =

Large educational complex in Cairo, Egypt

- أكاديمية الفنون
- Type: Government institutes specializing in the arts
- Established: 1969
- Parent institution: Ministry of Culture
- Location: Cairo, Cairo Governorate, Egypt; 30.0024305°N 31.1970038°E
- Website: aoa.edu.eg

The Academy of Arts (Egyptian Arabic: أكاديمية الفنون; Akādīmīya al-Finūn) is a large educational complex in Cairo, Egypt, comprising seven institutes as of 2024. The Academy was established by the Egyptian Ministry of Culture in 1969.

== History ==
In 1935 or 1944, the first of several arts-related institutes created by the Egyptian government, the Institute of Performing Arts, was established in Cairo. Others followed, including the Higher Institute of Cinema in 1959. They were all affiliated with the Ministry of Culture, which was established in Cairo, Egypt

In 1969, the Academy of Arts was created by government decree, and the separate institutes became part of the academy.

In 1981, the Academy underwent reorganisation, and in 1989, further regulations were issued for the governance of the Academy.

In 2019, it was decided that a branch of the Academy of Arts would be established in Alexandria. This new Academy will incorporate all of the educational facilities in Princess Faiqa Ahmed Fouad Palace.

In March 2024, it was announced that a decision regarding the establishment of another campus of the Academy of Arts was being waited on, including the Higher Institute of Cinema, the Conservatory, the Higher Institute of Theatrical Arts, and the Higher Institute of Ballet, in El-Shorouk, northeast of Cairo.

== Organisation ==
The Academy of Arts comprises several institutions of higher education:

- Higher Institute of Theatrical Arts (المعهد العالي للفنون المسرحية), established in 1944
- Cairo Conservatoire ("المعهد العالي للموسيقى "الكونســرفاتوار), established in 1959
- Higher Institute of Cinema (المعهد العالي للسينما), established in 1959
- Higher Institute of Ballet (المعهد العالي للباليه), established in 1959
- Higher Institute of Artistic Criticism (المعهد العالي للنقد الفني)
- Higher Institute of Arabic Music (المعهد العالي للموسيقى العربية), established in 1929; it consists of two performing groups: the Umm Kulthum Band for Arab Music and the Religious Recitation Band
- High Institute of Folk Arts (المعهد العالي للفنون الشعبية), established in 1981

== Leadership ==
As of 2024, Ashraf Zaki is president of the Academy of the Arts.

=== Former presidents ===
Former presidents of the Academy of Arts include:

- Moustafa Swif 1969/1970
- Mahmoud El Gheity 1970/1971
- Latifa El Zayat 1972/1973
- Rashad Roushdy 1975/1980
- Hussein Nassar 1980/1982
- Samha ElKhouli 1982/1985
- EzelDin Ismail 1985/1989
- Fawzi Fahmi 1989/2003
- Samir Sarhan 2003/2003
- Hani Mutaee 2003/2004
- Esmat Yehia 2006/2007
- Sameh Mahran 2008/2014
- Ahlam Younis 2014
- Ghada Gobara (?)
- Hesham Gamal (?)
