= Ministry of Culture (Egypt) =

Government ministry of Egypt

Coordinates: 30°3′33″N 31°13′1″E

Arab Republic of Egypt Ministry of Culture
- وزارة الثقافة
- Emblem of Egypt

Agency overview
- Formed: 1952; 74 years ago
- Preceding agencies: Ministry of National Guidance; Ministry of Culture and National Guidance
- Jurisdiction: Government of Egypt
- Headquarters: Zamalek, Cairo
- Agency executive: Nevine al-Kilani, Minister
- Website: http://www.moc.gov.eg/

The Ministry of Culture of Egypt is a ministry responsible for maintaining and promoting the culture of Egypt.

== History and structure ==
After Egypt's independence from Britain during the July 1952 Revolution, the new regime established the Ministry of National Guidance in November of that year, giving it wide responsibilities over broadcasting, journalism, press attaches and film censoring, as well as managing tourism, museums, theatre productions, and popular culture. It was considered based on the French model, but also shaped by the experiments of various Eastern Bloc countries with centralized production and dissemination of culture. The ministry was renamed by President Gamal Abdel Nasser in 1958 as the Ministry of Culture and National Guidance.

During president Anwar Sadat's regime, the ministry was renamed and restructured a number of times. In the first cabinet in October 1970 there was a Ministry of Culture, with Tharwat Okasha, and a separate Ministry for National Guidance with Mohamed Fayek. Within a month the minister of culture was replaced with Badraldin Abughazi, and the Ministry of National Guidance renamed as the Ministry of Information with the same minister. After a further few months in May 1971 Ismail Ghamem replaced Abughazi. In 1979 it was the Ministry of Culture and Information (during Mansour Hassan's tenure).

Under the Mubarak regime it became the Ministry of State for Culture in 1982, with the information portfolio spun off into a separate ministry yet again.

== Affiliated agencies ==
- Supreme Council of Culture
- General Egyptian Book Organisation
- National Library and Archives (Dar al-Kutub)
- General Authority for Cultural Palaces
- Cairo Opera House
- Academy of Arts
- Department of Applied Arts
- The Fine Arts Sector
- Cultural Development Fund
- The Book and Publishing Commission

== Events ==
The Ministry often sends delegations to participate in events. In 2015, the Ministry participated in events in Doha, Qatar. In November, 2018 the Ministry participated in the second annual Music Festival in Corsica.

== Criticism ==
In January 2001, the Egyptian Ministry of Culture was criticized for withdrawing three novels of homoerotic poetry by the well-known 8th Century classical Arabic poet Abu Nuwas from circulation.

== Ministers ==
- Fathi Radwan, June 26, 1958 - October 7, 1958
- Tharwat Okasha, October 7, 1958 - September 27, 1962
- Mohammed Abdul Qader, September 27, 1962 - March 25, 1965
- Suleiman Huzayyin, 1 October 1965 - September 10, 1966
- Tharwat Okasha, September 10, 1966 - November 18, 1970
- Badr al-Din Abu Ghazi, November 18, 1970 - May 14, 1971
- Ismail Ghanem, May 14, 1971 - September 19, 1971
- Yusuf Sibai, March 27, 1973 - March 19, 1976
- Gamal Al 'atifi, March 19, 1976 - February 3, 1977
- Abdel Moneim El-Sawy, February 3, 1977 - October 5, 1978
- Mansour Hassan, 19 June 1979 - 23 June 1981
- Mohammed Abdel-Hamid Radwan, September 22, 1981 - September 4, 1985
- Ahmed Heikal, September 5, 1985 - October 12, 1987
- Farouk Hosny, October 12, 1987 - January 28, 2011
- Gaber Asfour, January 21, 2011 - February 9, 2011
- Mohamed Assawi, February 22, 2011 - March 3, 2011
- Emad Eddin Abu Ghazi, March 7, 2011 - November 20, 2011
- Shaker Abdel Hamid, December 7, 2011 - April 20, 2012
- Saber al-Arab, April 2012 - July 2014
- Gaber Asfour, July 2014 - March 2015
- Abdel Wahed Al-Nabawi, March 2015 - August 2015
- Helmi Al-Namnam, August 2015 - January 2018
- Ines Abdel-Dayem, January 2018 — August 2022
- Nevine Al-Kilani, August 2022 —

== See also ==
- Cabinet of Egypt
