= Teresina Singer =

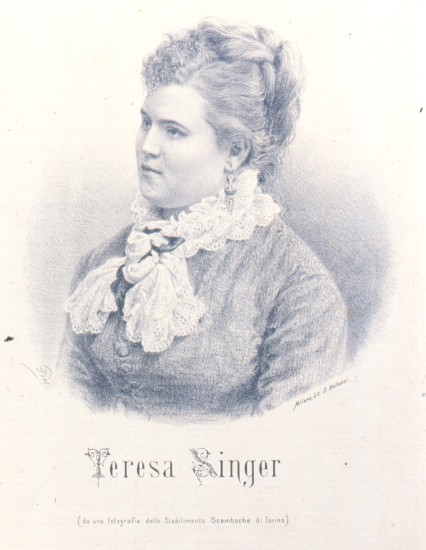
- Born: 1850; Olomouc
- Died: 9 January 1928 (aged 74–75); Florence

Teresina Singer (also known as Teresa Singer or Theresia Singer; 1850 – 9 January 1928), was an operatic soprano.

Teresina Singer was born in Olomouc in 1850.

Singer trained in Vienna and in Italy. During the 1870–1871 season, she sang in the Court Opera of Vienna, before travelling to Italy. In 1873 she debuted at Milan's La Scala as the title role of Verdi's Aida and as Marguerite in Gounod's Faust. In 1876 she joined the Théâtre-Italien in Paris, and in 1877 she sang at the Theater of Graz. In 1878 she appeared at the Teatro di San Carlo in Naples with the premiere of the opera Antonio e Cleopatra by Mario Rossi.

The same year, Singer performed at the Teatro Nacional in Buenos Aires, and in 1880 in the same city at the Teatro Politeama. She sang at the Teatro Municipale Piacenza in 1880 as the title role in the premiere of the opera Stella by Auteri-Manzocchi. In 1881 she appeared at the Teatro Costanzi in Rome as Aida and Leonora in La forza del destino by Verdi. In 1882 she sang at the Teatro Argentina in Rome as Selika in Meyerbeer's L'Africaine and performed in the Naples premiere of Massenet's Le roi de Lahore as Sita. In 1886 she in a performance of Requiem by Verdi in Naples. Her other guest appearances included performances at the Teatro Regio in Turin and at the opera house in Valencia.

Singer's other roles included Leonora in Il trovatore and the title character in La Gioconda by Ponchielli. In the 1880s she moved into the mezzo-soprano repertoire, such as Amneris in Aida and the title part in Carmen. In 1891 she gave up her stage career and became a teacher in Florence.

Singer died in Florence on 9 January 1928.

== Sources ==
- Casaglia, Gherardo (2005). "Teresa Singer". L'Almanacco di Gherardo Casaglia (in Italian).
