= El Safa Palace =

Presidential palace in Alexandria, Egypt

- قصر الصفا
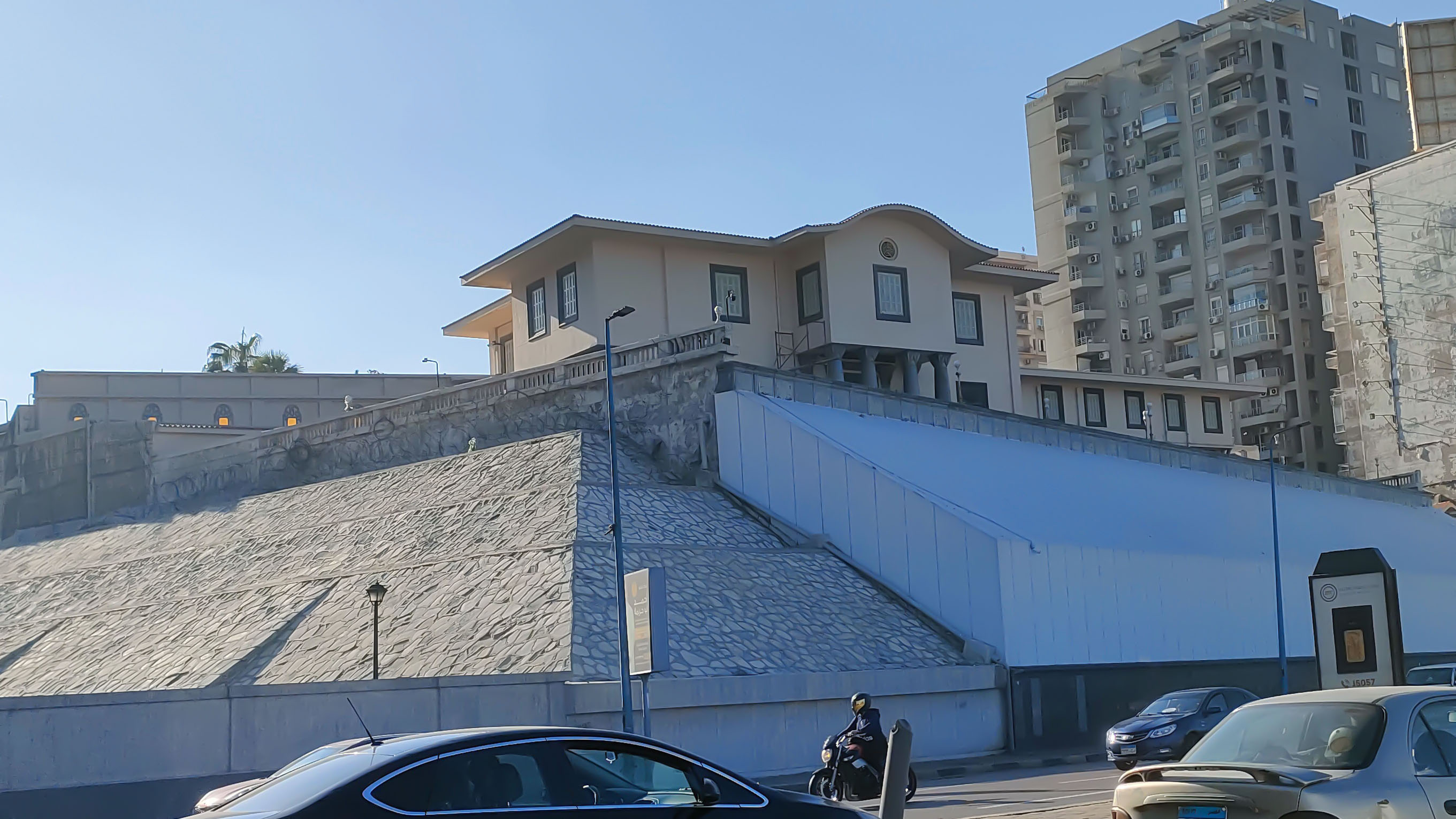
- The palace seen from outside

- Location within Egypt

General information
- Location: Alexandria, Egypt
- Coordinates: 31°14′38″N 29°57′52″E
- Completed: 1887

El Safa Palace (Egyptian Arabic: قصر الصفة) is a presidential palace in the Zizinia neighborhood of Alexandria, Egypt. It is located on a hill overlooking the Mediterranean.

== History ==
Built in 1887 by Stephan Zizinia, the palace later became the Gloria Hotel until 1927, when Prince Mohammed Ali Tewfik purchased the hotel and named it Al Safa Palace after Mount Safa in Mecca. Under Prince Mohammed, the palace was expanded several times and renovated into a royal palace. The palace is now used as a presidential palace and is used to host state guests and governmental officials.

== Building Plan ==
The palace consists of three floors, with several Quranic verses being displayed at the palace's entrance. The palace includes a suit and a salon, with European characters being displayed in the building. The palace also has several regalia dating back to the time of the monarchy.
