= Khedivial Opera House =

Former opera house in Cairo, Egypt

Coordinates: 30.0507°N 31.2480°E

Egyptian Royal Opera House
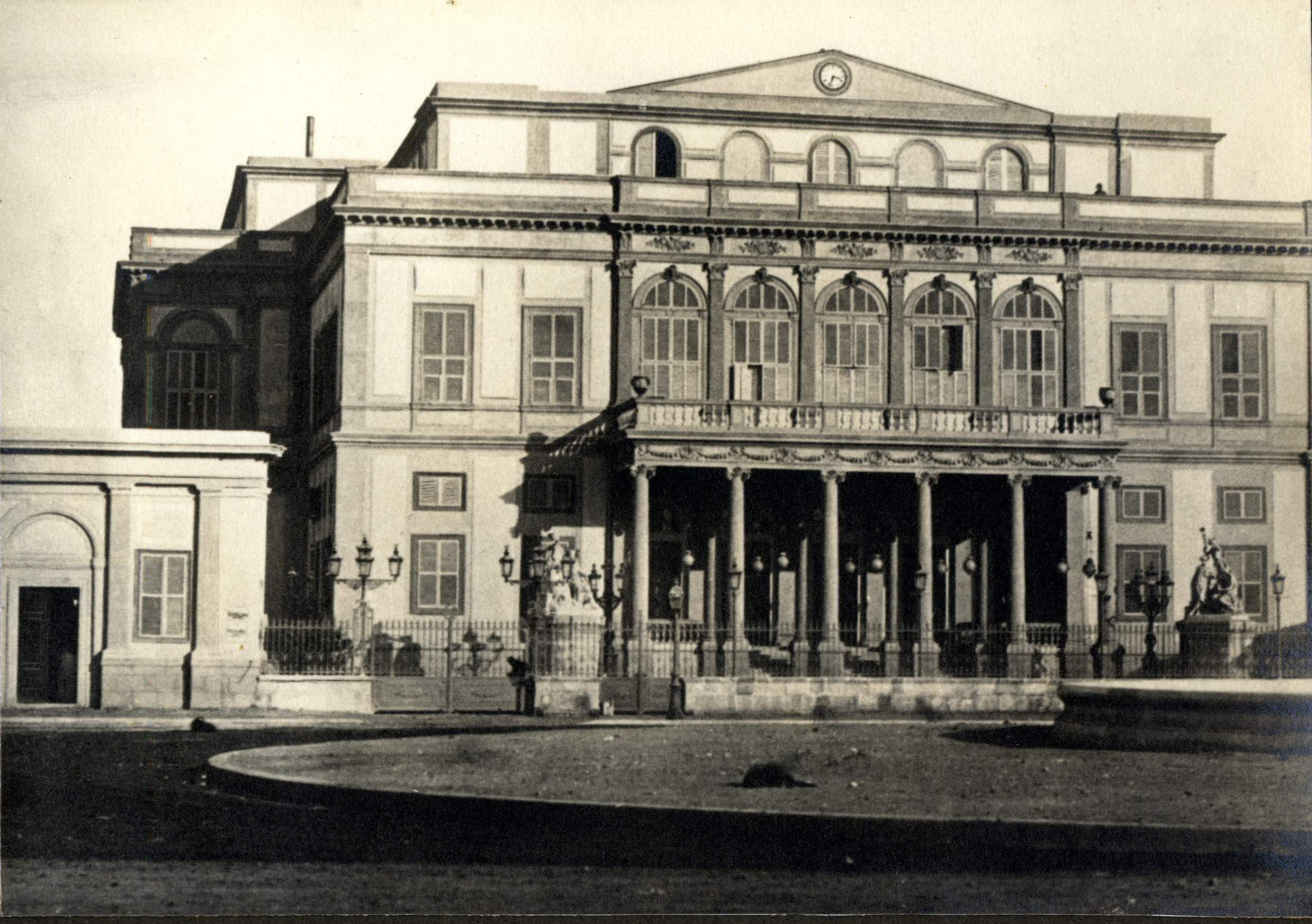
- Interactive map of Egyptian Royal Opera House
- Location: Cairo, Egypt
- Owner: Egyptian Government
- Capacity: 1,200 people
- Type: Opera house

Construction
- Opened: 1 November 1869
- Closed: 28 October 1971
- Reopened: 10 October 1988 as (Cairo Opera House)
- Architect: Pietro Avoscani

Website
- www.cairoopera.org

The Khedivial Opera House or Egyptian Royal Opera House (Egyptian Arabic: دار الأوبرا الخديوية / ALA-LC: Dār Awbirā al-Khudaywī) was an opera house in Cairo, Egypt, the oldest opera house in all of Africa and the Middle East. It was inaugurated on 1 November 1869 and it burned down on 28 October 1971, and was superseded by the Cairo Opera House on 10 October 1988.

== Overview ==
The opera house was built on the orders of the Khedive Ismail to celebrate the opening of the Suez Canal. The Italian architect Pietro Avoscani (perhaps assisted by one Mario Rossi) designed the building. It seated approximately 850 people and was made mostly of wood. It was located between the districts of Azbakeya and Ismailyya in Egypt's capital city.

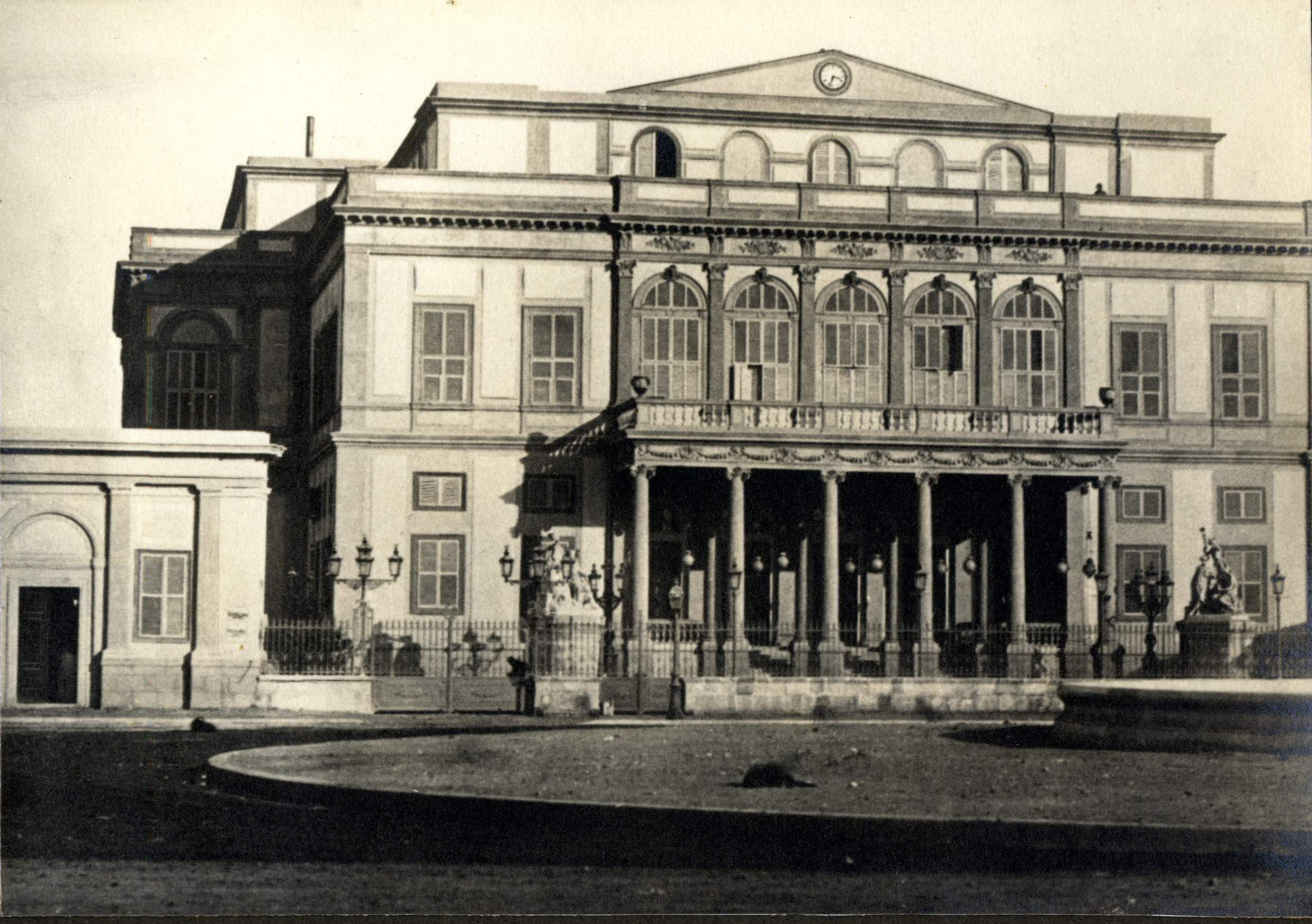
The Khedivial Opera House in 1869.

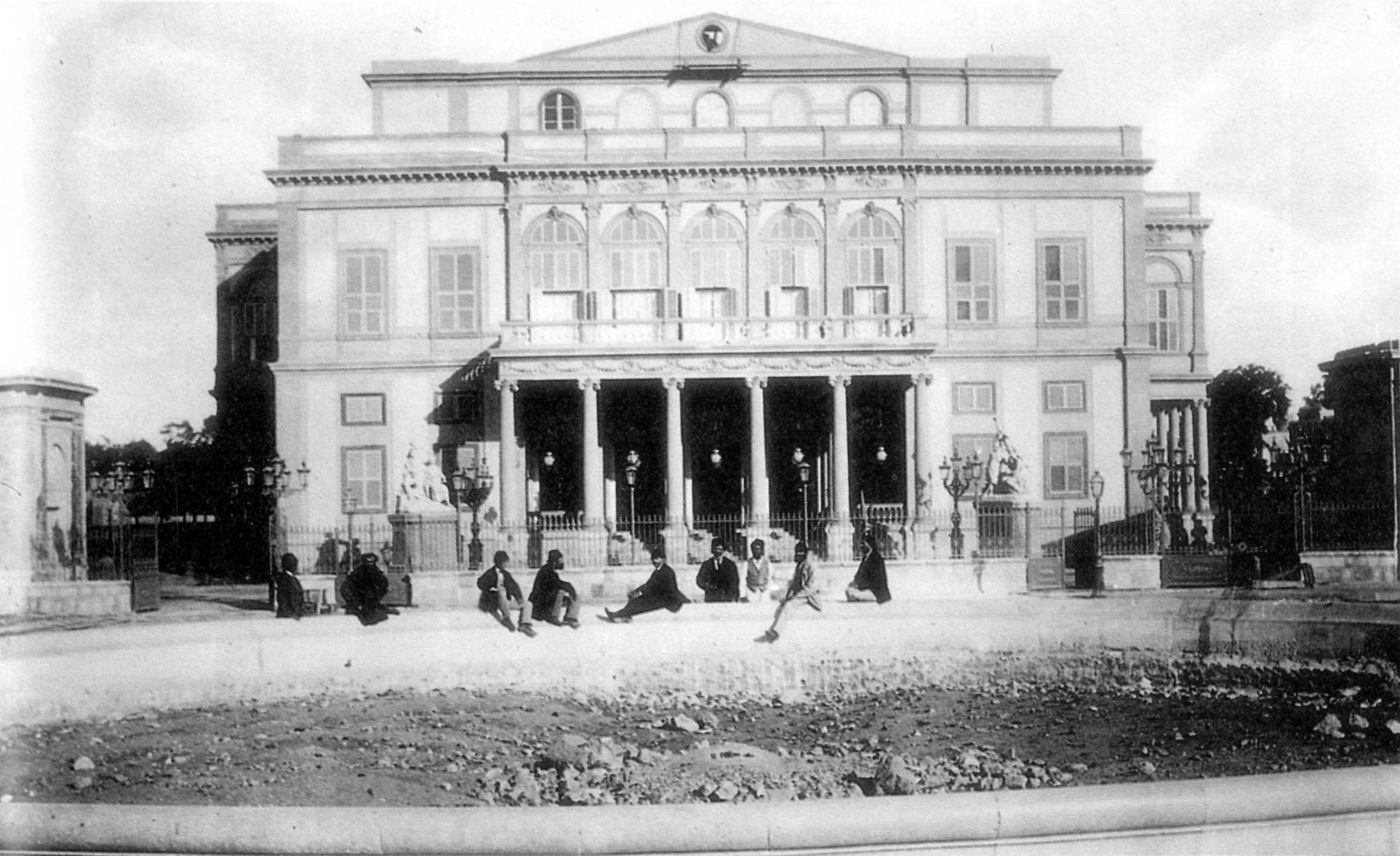
The Khedivial Opera House.

Verdi's opera Rigoletto was the first opera performed at the opera house on 1 November 1869. Ismail planned a grander exhibition for his new theatre. After months of delay due to the outbreak of the Franco-Prussian War, Verdi's new opera, Aida (set in the Old Kingdom of Egypt), received its world premiere at the Khedivial Opera House on 24 December 1871.

In the early morning hours of 28 October 1971, the opera house burned to the ground. The all-wooden building was quickly consumed, and only two statues made by Mohamed Hassan survived.

After the original opera house was destroyed, Cairo was without an opera house for nearly two decades until the opening of the new Cairo Opera House in 1988. The site of the Khedivial Opera House has been rebuilt into a multi-story concrete car garage. The square (to the south of Al Ataba metro station) overlooking the building's location, is still called Opera Square (Meidan El Opera).

== See also ==
- Cairo Opera House
- Alexandria Opera House
- Port Said Cultural Entertainment Center
