= Pietro Avoscani =

Italian architect

- Born: 1816; Livorno
- Died: March 1, 1891; Alexandria
- Occupation: Architect
- Years active: 1837–ca. 1875
- Buildings: Khedivial Opera House, Cairo
- Projects: Ras El Tin Palace
- Design: Gezirah Palace

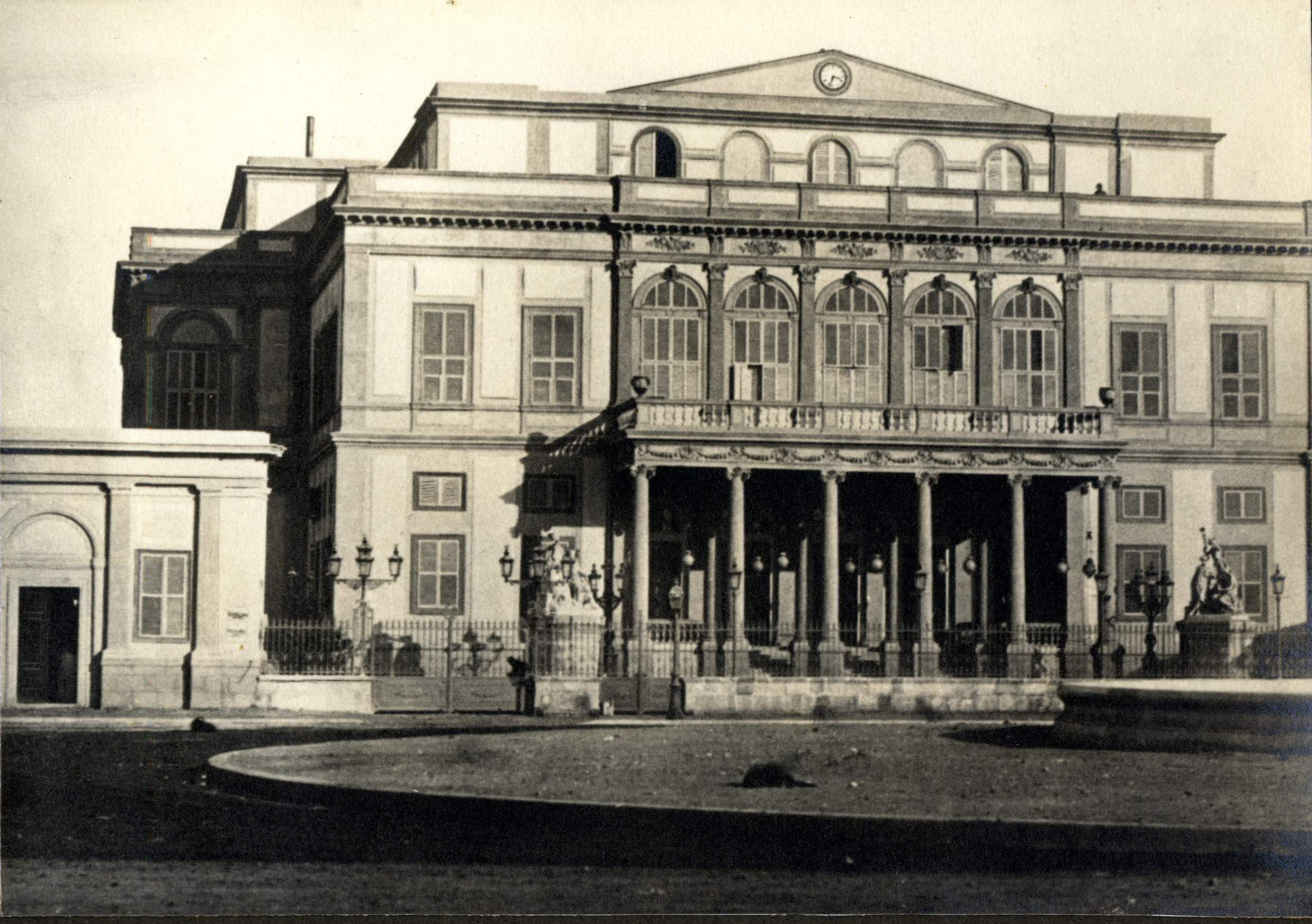
Cairo Opera House, 1869.

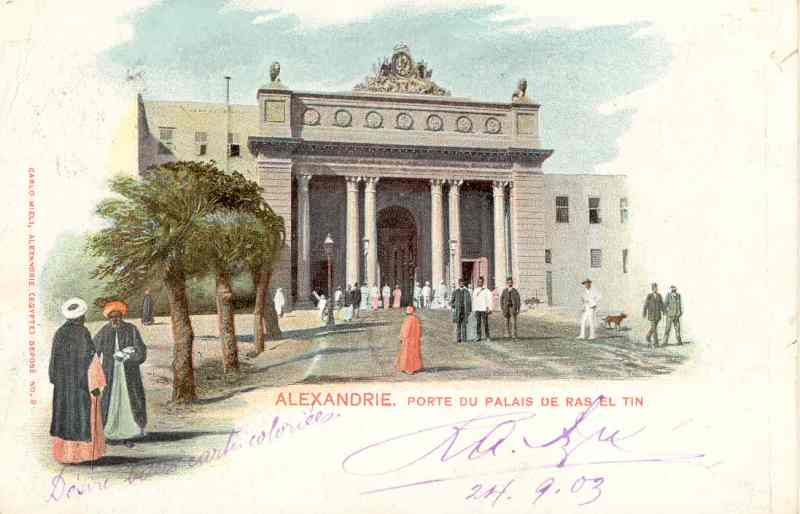
Entrance gate of the Ras El Tin Palace (postcard, 1903).

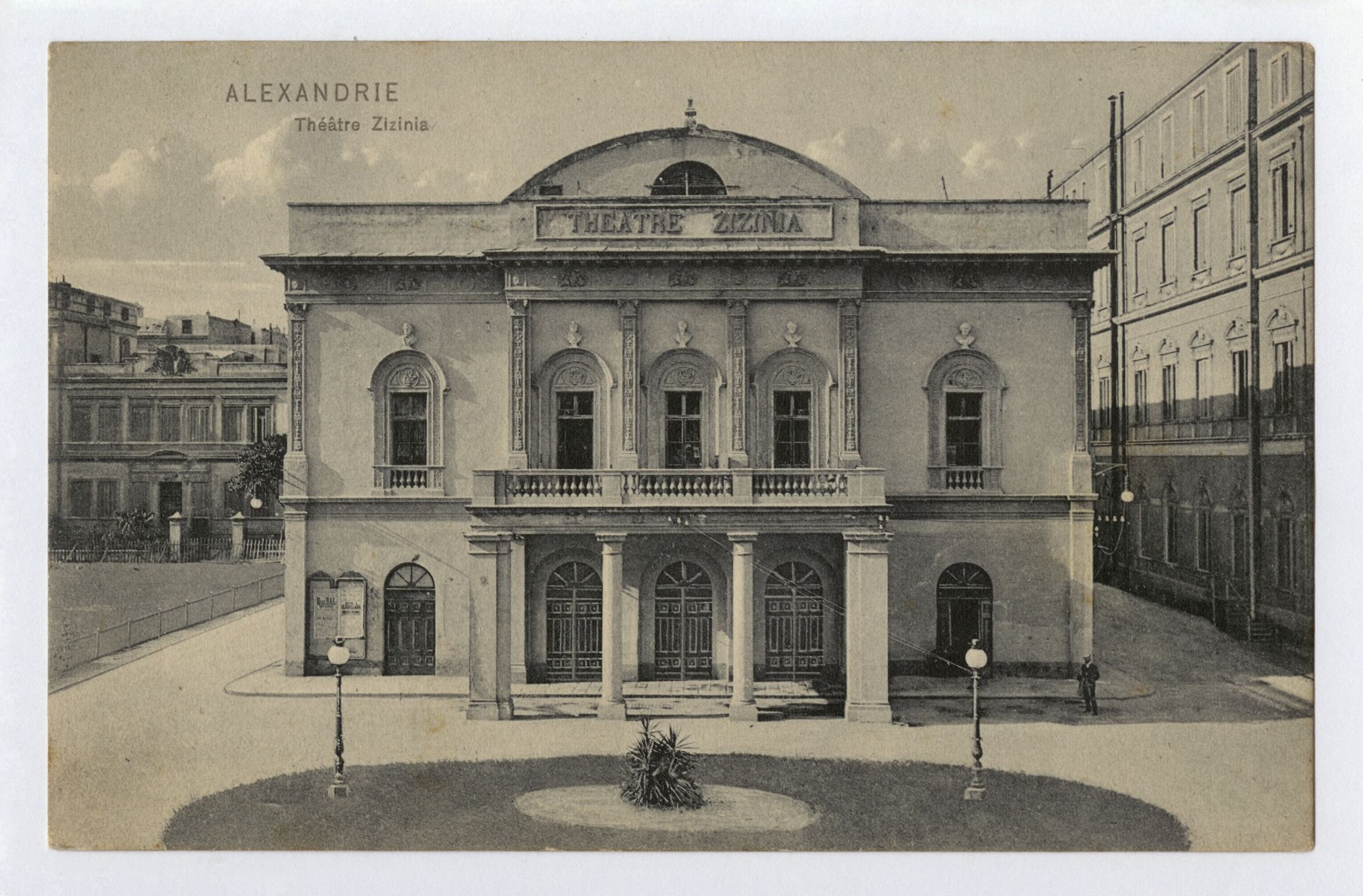
Théâtre Zizinia (postcard, ca. 1900?).

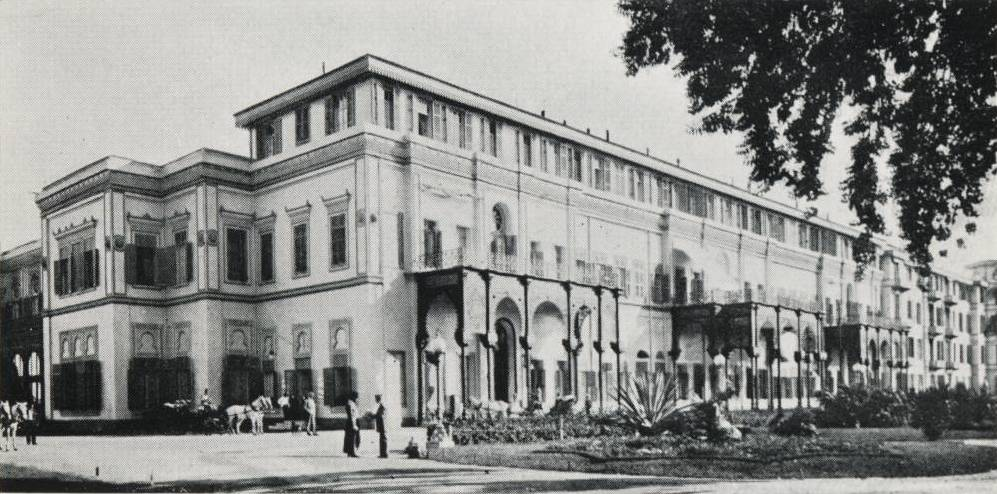
Ghezira Palace, 1906.

Pietro Avoscani (Livorno, 1816 – Alexandria, 1 March 1891) was an Italian interior designer and architect who worked mainly in Egypt. He was employed by the Khedivial court and designed numerous monumental buildings, particularly in Alexandria and Cairo.

== Life ==
Pietro Avoscani was born in Livorno as the son of Count Francesco Avoscani and his wife. After the death of both his parents, he grew up in difficult circumstances. From a young age, he revealed himself as a talented artist and decorator, with a deep love of drawing and painting. In the 1830s he became involved in the revolutionary movement La Giovine Italia, after which he was forced to flee Italy. In 1837, he settled in Alexandria, Egypt, where his brother Camillo was already serving in the Egyptian navy.

In Alexandria, Avoscani began his work as a decorator at the Ras El Tin Palace. He quickly gained recognition from Muhammad Ali Pasha, who commissioned him to decorate several palaces and even offered him the leadership of a drawing and painting school—an offer he declined to maintain his independence.

Isma'il Pasha of Egypt, ruler of Egypt from 1863 onward, entrusted him with a number of prestigious commissions.

== Travel and diplomacy ==
At the initiative of Muhammad Ali, Avoscani undertook a diplomatic and artistic journey through Europe in 1839. He visited Athens, Constantinople, Odessa, Moscow, Saint Petersburg, and Vienna, where he established contacts with artists, diplomats, and members of the aristocracy. In Russia, he stayed at the Alupka Palace of Prince Vorontsov in the Crimea, where he met members of the imperial family.

In 1853, he traveled to Italy and France to select marble and decorative elements for state projects, frequently working with Italian suppliers and artists.

== Architectural works in Egypt ==
Avoscani designed and decorated numerous representative buildings in Alexandria and Cairo. Some of his most important projects include:

- Decoration of the Ras El Tin Palace (1837–1847), including the entrance gate and marble coat of arms;
- Decoration and sculpture for the Gabbari Palace (1846–1848), including six marble statues by Italian sculptors such as Salvino Salvini, Pietro Costa, and Ulisse Cambi;
- Abbasiyya and Hilmiya Palaces (1850–1853), monumental residences located outside central Cairo, commissioned by Abbas Pasha;
- Various features including a kiosk, fountain, and grand staircase for the Gezirah Palace in Zamalek, Cairo (1860–1861), which housed international guests during the opening of the Suez Canal and now forms part of the Cairo Marriott Hotel;
- Decoration of the Shubra Palace, Cairo (1860–1861), the Cairo residence of Muhammad Ali, nicknamed the "Egyptian Versailles";
- Design and construction of the Zizinia Theatre (1862–1863), an opera house in Alexandria inspired by La Scala in Milan. It was demolished in 1908 and replaced with a new opera house;
- Design and construction of the Khedivial Opera House in Cairo (1869), completed in only six months for the opening of the Suez Canal. It was destroyed by fire in 1971;
- Design and construction of the International Cotton Exchange (Bourse) of Minet el-Bassal, Alexandria (1871).

== Urban planning ==
Avoscani was also active as an urban planner and investor. He designed ambitious projects such as the boulevard connecting Ras El Tin with Ramleh – now part of the Corniche of Alexandria – which was later taken over after his death by Dietrich Bey and executed by the Almagià brothers.

== Cultural contributions ==
In addition to his architectural work, Avoscani was a promoter of art, industry, and education. He organized the first art exhibition in Egypt, imported artworks and marble from Italy, and supported the founding of schools and cultural institutions for the Colonia Italiana (Italian community) in Alexandria, including the Italian College and the International Circle.

He was also involved in philanthropy and provided financial support to young artists. He remained committed throughout his life to his political convictions and the ideals of the Young Italy movement: even in Egypt, he remained active in support of Giuseppe Mazzini's vision.

== Sources ==
- Abdoun, Saleh (1971). Genesi dell'"Aida", con documentazione inedita. Quaderni dell'Istituto di Studi Verdiani (in Italian). Vol. 4. Turin: EDT. ISBN 88-85065-96-1.
- Awad, Mohamed Fouad (1990). "Italian influence on Alexandria's architecture (1834-1985)" (PDF). Environmental Design: Journal of the Islamic Environmental Design Research Centre. Rome: Carucci Editore: 72–85.
- Balboni, L.A. (1906). Gl'Italiani nella civiltà egiziana del secolo XIX. Storia, biografie, monografie (in Italian). Vol. 1. Alexandria: Stabilmento Tipo-litografico V. Penasson. pp. 394–408.
- Michel, Ersilio (1958). Esuli italiani in Egitto (1815-1861) (in Italian). Turin: Stabilimento Grafico Impronta.
- Khalil, Mohamed Ali Mohamed (2009). The Italian Architecture in Alexandria, Egypt. The conservation of the Italian residential buildings (unpublished MA thesis, Libera Università degli Studi di Enna "Kore"). pp. 19–20.
- Pallini, Cristina (2004). "Italian Architects and Modern Egypt" (PDF). Massachusetts Institute of Technology. pp. 6–12.
- Petrocelli, Paolo (2020-06-06). "The origins of opera houses in Egypt". Medium.com.
- Prinzivalli, Luciano (2006). "Pietro Avoscani 1816 - 1891". Italiani in Egitto (in Italian). Archived from the original on 2019-08-17.
- Tagher, J. (1949). "Pietro Avoscani, artiste-décorateur et homme d'affaires". Cahiers d'histoire égyptienne (in French). 4: 306–314.
- Ulacacci, Niccola (1870). Pietro Avoscani. Cenni biografici (in Italian). [Livorno].

== See also ==
- Italian Egyptians
- Muhammad Ali dynasty
