= Alexandria Opera House =

Opera house in Alexandria, Egypt

Coordinates: 31°11′48″N 29°54′05″E

- Sayed Darwish Theater
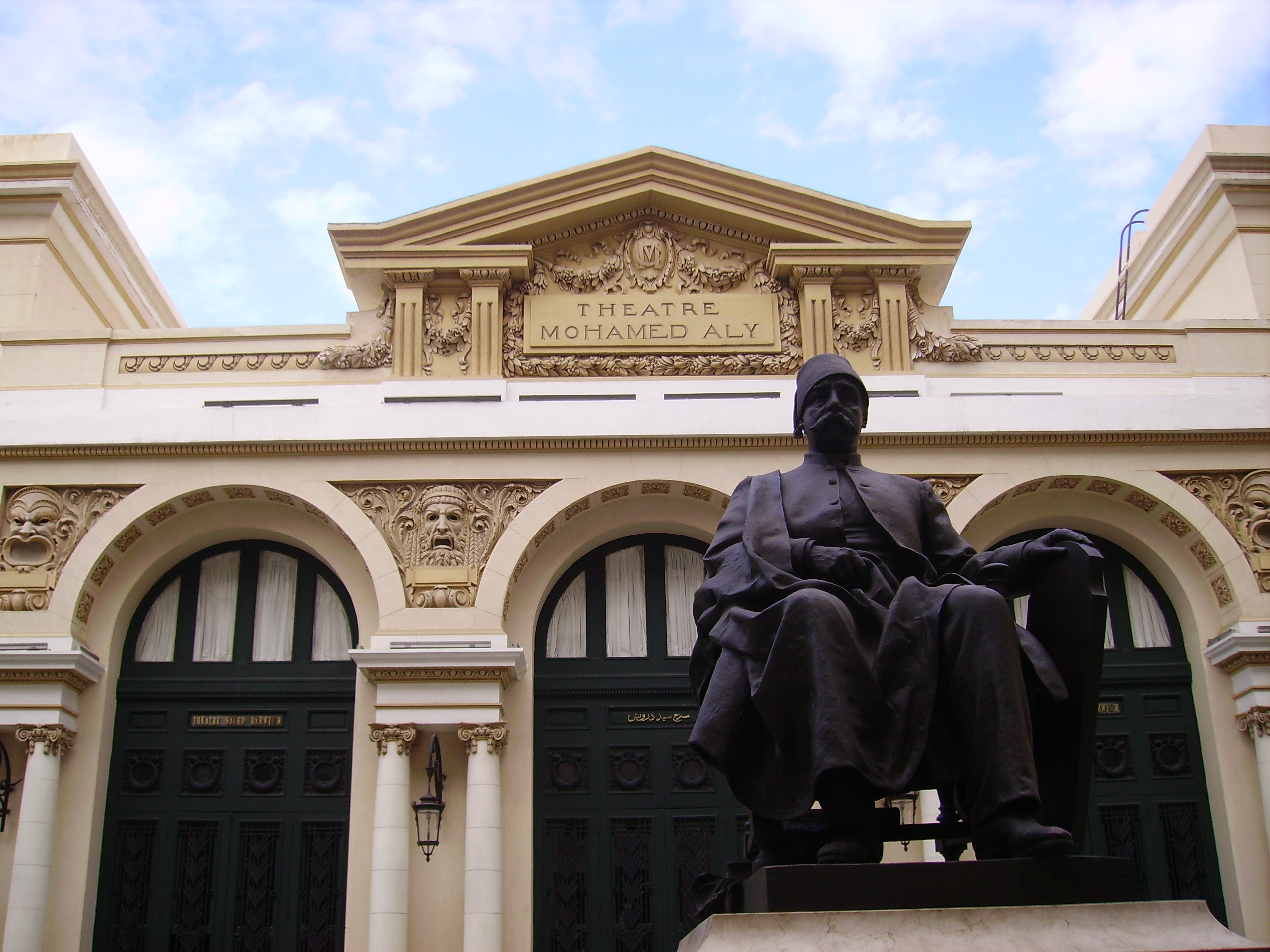
- Statue of Sayed Darwish at the entrance
- Interactive map of Alexandria Opera House
- Former names: Teatro Mohamed Ali
- Location: Alexandria, Egypt
- Owner: National Cultural Center
- Capacity: 1,200 people
- Type: Opera house

Construction
- Built: 1918
- Opened: 1921
- Architect: Georges Parcq

Alexandria Opera House, also known as Sayed Darwish Theatre, is a historic opera house in the city of Alexandria, Egypt. The 1,200-seat Renaissance Revival venue was built from 1918 to 1921, designed by Georges Parcq. The opera house was inaugurated as the Teatro Mohamed Ali in the presence of King Fouad I. It became known by its current name after the 1952 Revolution.

== History ==
The Alexandria Opera House is the main performance venue in Alexandria, Egypt, on the Mediterranean coast. It was built in 1918 and opened in 1921. Originally called the Muhammad Ali Theatre, the name is still inscribed on the main facade. Since 1962, the Alexandria Opera House has been named after the music writer, composer and Alexandrian icon, Sayed Darwish (1892–1923), in recognition of his contributions to modernizing music in Egypt.

The Alexandria Opera House is the second oldest opera house in Egypt, after the old Egyptian Royal Opera House (which burned down in a fire in 1971 after serving as a cultural landmark for 102 years; it was rebuilt and reopened in 1988 at a different location) as the Cairo Opera House. The building was registered as a historical monument in 1999. The redevelopment and restoration of the theater, in accordance with its distinctive architectural style, took approximately a year and a half, by order of the former Egyptian Egyptian Minister of Culture, Farouk Hosny. It was reopened in the presence of former Egyptian President Hosni Mubarak on 27 January 2004.

== Venues and facilities ==
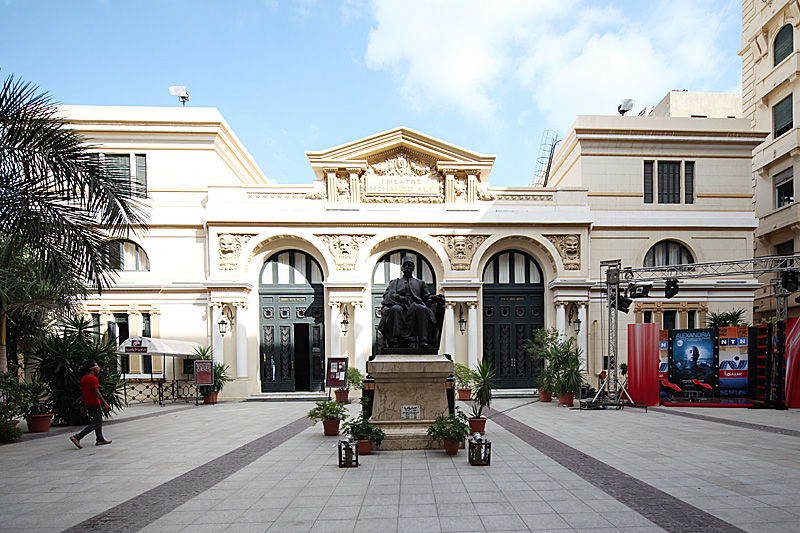
Alexandria Opera House facade

The building was designed in the Ionic architectural style by the renowned French architect Georges Parcq for the Qardahi family in the city. Parcq drew inspiration from the Vienna State Opera in Vienna, Austria and the Odéon Theatre in Paris, France, and decorated it with classical European motifs, as was prevalent in Egypt at the beginning of the 20th century. Numerous Egyptian and European theatrical and musical performances were presented there. The first theatrical performance was Scheherazade on June 30, 1921. Its large theater seats 1,000 people, and its total area is 4,200 square meters. The theater is located on El-Hurriya Road (Fouad Street) in the Raml Station area.

The Alexandria Opera House hosts several Egyptian and international ensembles, including the Cairo Symphony Orchestra, the Alexandria Opera Chamber Orchestra, the Alexandria Opera Company for Arabic Music and Singing, and the National Arab Music Ensemble. It also features performances by the Abdel Halim Nouira Ensemble, religious chanting groups, ballet companies, orchestras, modern dance companies, and folk groups, in addition to leading stars from Egypt and the Arab world. As with all opera houses worldwide, formal attire is required for entry to the opera house.

== See also ==
- Cairo Opera House
- Port Said Cultural Entertainment Center

== Sources ==
- Alexandria Opera House "Sayed Darwish Theatre" on cairoopera.org
- Alexandria Opera House "Sayed Darwish Theatre" on Facebook
