= Josephine Schefsky =

German opera singer

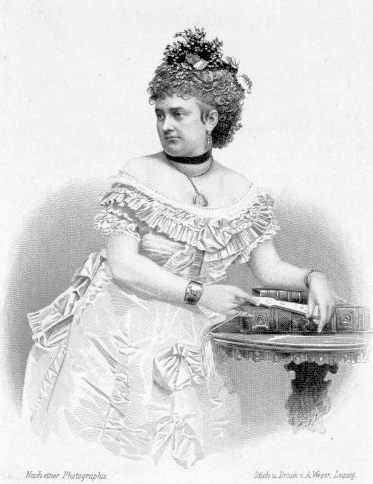
Josephine Schefsky

Josephine Schefsky (sometimes spelled Schefzky) (1843 – 11 November 1912) was a German opera singer who had an active career during the latter half of the 19th century. Possessing a powerful voice with a wide vocal range, she tackled roles from both the soprano and mezzo-soprano repertoires. She is best remembered today for portraying several roles in the first complete presentation of Richard Wagner's The Ring Cycle at the very first Bayreuth Festival in 1876.

== Biography ==
Schefsky made her professional opera debut in 1868 at the Bavarian State Opera as Orfeo in Christoph Willibald Gluck's Orfeo ed Euridice. She was one of the leading artists at that house up through 1883 and was the favorite performer of King Ludwig II of Bavaria. While there she notably sang the role of Amneris in the Munich premiere of Giuseppe Verdi's Aida in 1877.

Wagner heard Schefsky perform in Munich and was very impressed by her vocal and dramatic abilities. He invited her to take part in the first presentation of the complete Ring Cycle at the Bayreuth Festival in 1876. At the festival she premiered the role of the second Norn in Wagner's Götterdämmerung on 17 August 1876 and sang the role of Sieglinde in Wagner's Die Walküre on 14 August 14, 1876.

In 1882 Schefsky portrayed Magdalena in the United Kingdom premiere of Wagner's Die Meistersinger von Nürnberg at the Theatre Royal, Drury Lane in London under the direction of Hans Richter. After leaving the employ of the Bavarian State Opera in 1883, she sang at the Opéra national du Rhin and the Vienna State Opera in 1883/84. She spent her last few years on the stage performing at the Berlin State Opera and the Oper Frankfurt. Among the many roles she sang on stage were Azucena in Verdi's Il trovatore, Fidès in Giacomo Meyerbeer's Le prophète, Frau Reich in The Merry Wives of Windsor, Gertrude in Ambroise Thomas's Hamlet, Maddalena in Verdi's Rigoletto, and Sieglinde in The Ring Cycle.

After retiring from the stage in the early 1890s, Schefsky taught singing in Munich. She died there in 1912 at the age of 69.
