= Giuseppe Capponi =

Italian opera singer (1832–1889)

Giuseppe Capponi (second from left) in the first performance of the Verdi Requiem at La Scala on 25 May 1874

Giuseppe Capponi (14 September 1832 – 6 August 1889) was an Italian operatic tenor who sang leading roles both in Italy and Europe. He is most remembered today as the tenor soloist in the world premiere of the Verdi Requiem.

Capponi was born in Cantiano near Pesaro and studied music there with the composer and Cantiano's maestro di cappella, Natale Pellicci. From 1857 he was the primo tenore in the choir of the Basilica della Santa Casa in Loreto, a post he held to the end of his life. He made his stage debut in 1858 at the Teatro Valle in Rome where he sang comprimario roles. His debut in a leading tenor role came in 1860, when he sang Pollione in Norma at Pesaro. He was heard in Paris at the Théâtre-Italien in 1863 in the relatively minor role of Barbarino in Alessandro Stradella. However, by the 1865–1866 season, he was singing major roles at the Teatro Regio in Parma, including Vasco da Gama in Meyerbeer's L'Africaine, Lamberto in the world premiere of Giovanni Rossi's Niccolò de' Lapi, and the Duke of Mantova in Rigoletto.

== Sources ==
- Casaglia, Gherardo (2005)."Giuseppe Capponi". L'Almanacco di Gherardo Casaglia (in Italian).
- Resigno, Eduardo (2001). "Capponi, Giuseppe" Dizionario Verdiano. Biblioteca Universale Rizzoli, pp. 126–127. ISBN 88-17-86628-8 (in Italian)
- Busch, Hans (1978). Verdi's Aida: the history of an opera in letters and documents. University of Minnesota Press. ISBN 0-8166-0800-8
