= Zizinia =

Zizinia زيزينيا
- Zizinia
- Location in Egypt
- Coordinates: 31.235408°N 29.968243°E
- Country: Egypt
- Governorate: Alexandria
- City: Alexandria
- Time zone: UTC+2 (EET)
  - Summer (DST): UTC+3 (EEST)

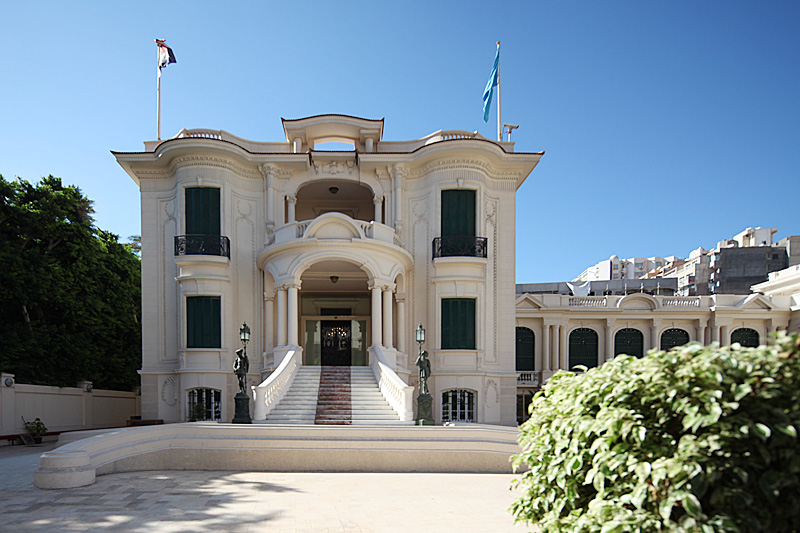
The Royal Jewelry Museum in Zizinia, Alexandria

Zizinia (Arabic: زيزينيا) is a neighborhood in Alexandria, Egypt. It is home to the Royal Jewelry Museum and residence of the Governor of Alexandria. It is regarded as an affluent neighborhood where many lawyers, doctors, and business executives live.

== History ==
The name of the neighborhood goes back to Greek merchant Stephan Zizinia (1784–1868), consul-general of Belgium in Egypt. He sold part of the land he owned in Alexandria to the government for the extension of the tram line.

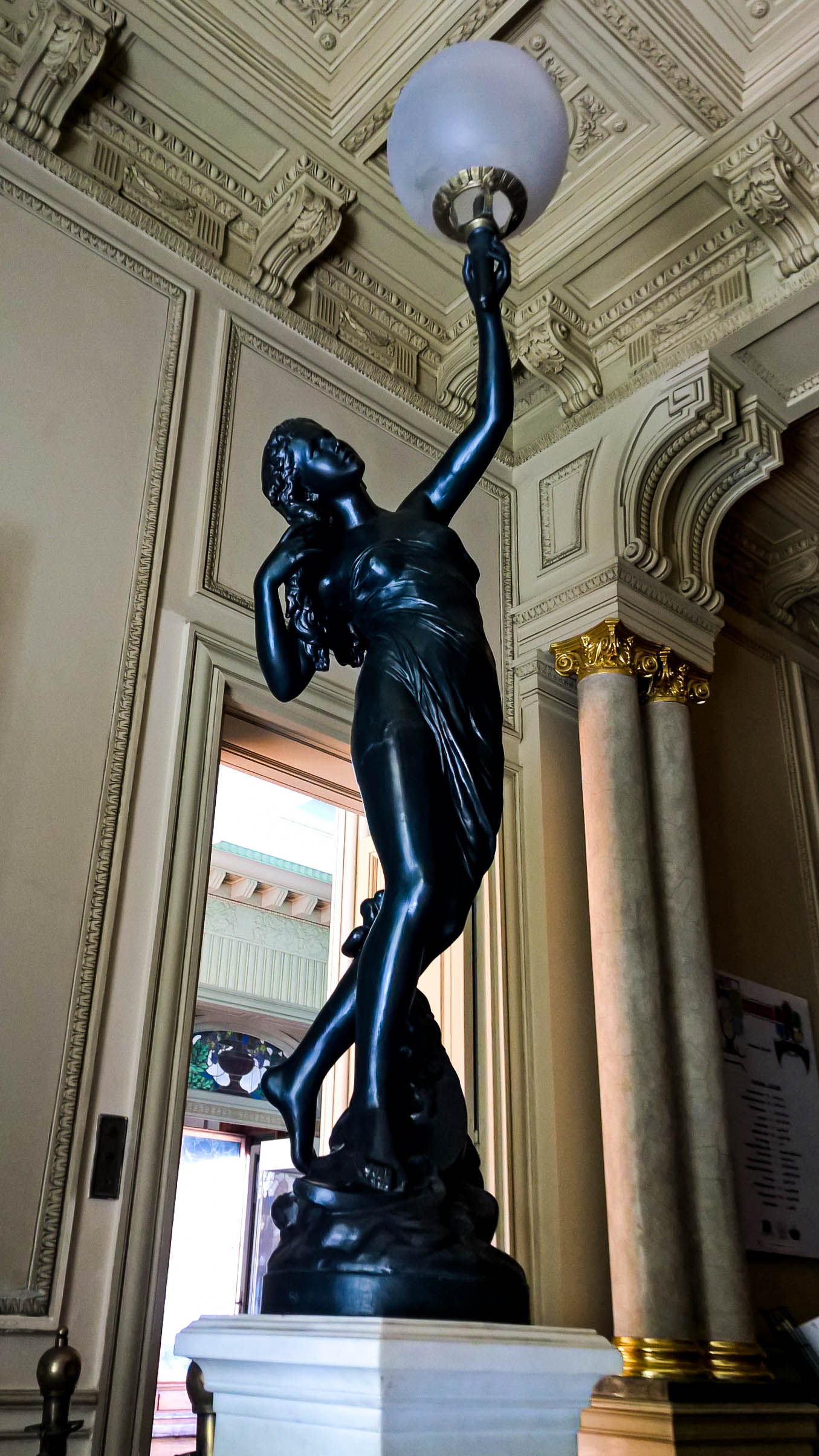
Statue at the entrance of the Royal Jewelry Museum

== Places of interest ==
- Royal Jewelry Museum
- Palace of Princess Aziza Fahmy
- El Safa Palace (Presidential Palace)
- Faculty of Fine Arts of Alexandria University
- Egyptian American Book Center (EABC)
- Ahmed Yahya Pasha Mosque
- Specialized Hospital for Gastroenterology & Hepatology
- Banks:
  1. National Bank of Egypt
  2. QNB Alahli (Qatar Bank)
  3. National Bank of Kuwait
  4. Commercial International Bank (CIB)
  5. The United Bank of Egypt
  6. Housing & Development Bank (HDB)
- Tolip Beach
- West Delta Electricity Production Company (WDEPC)
- Radio and Television Building
- Starbucks - Gleem Bay
- Costa Coffee - Gleem Bay
- Cilantro Café
- Angelina Kyria Pâtisserie
- Zahran Market (Zizinia)
- Metro Market (Zizinia)
