= Maria Waldmann =

Austrian mezzo-soprano

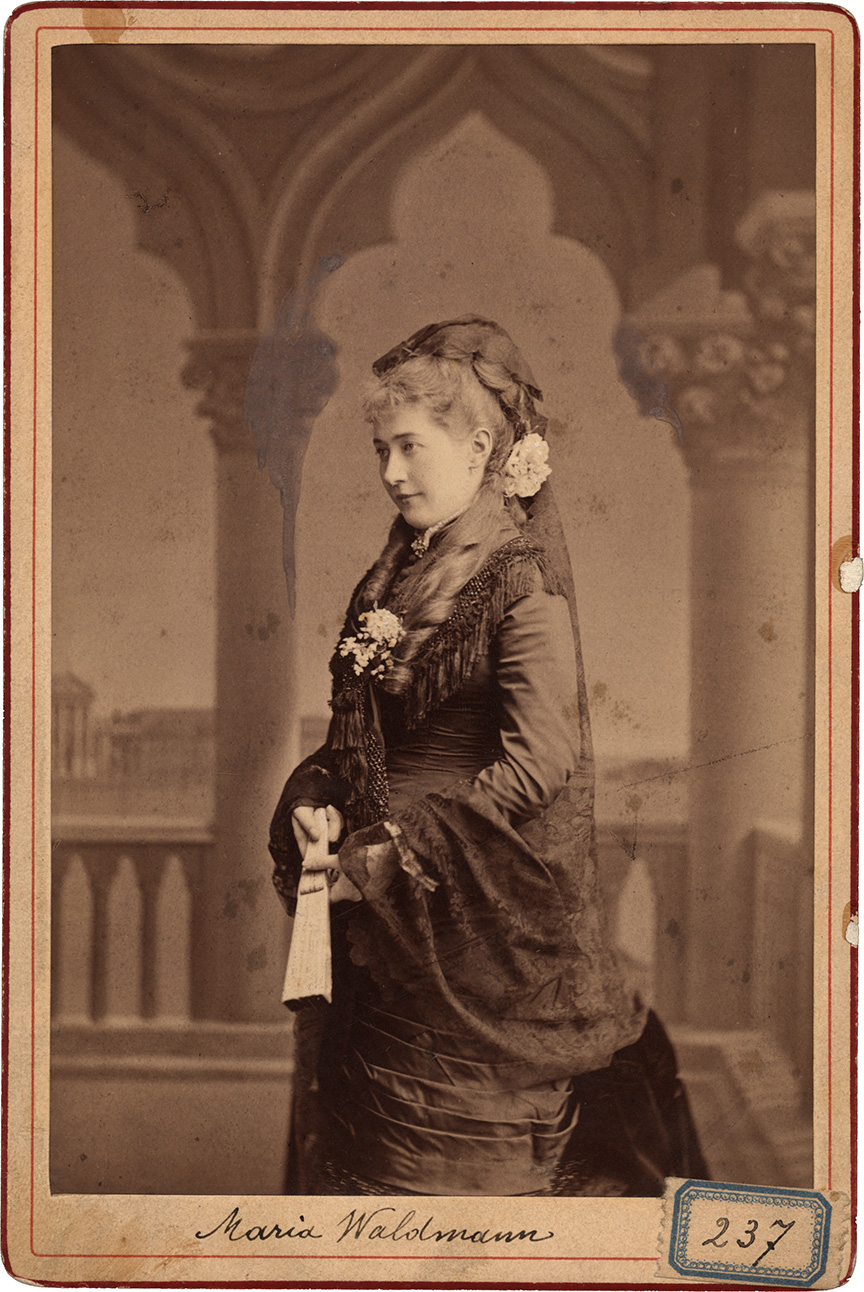
Maria Waldmann in Venice, 1876

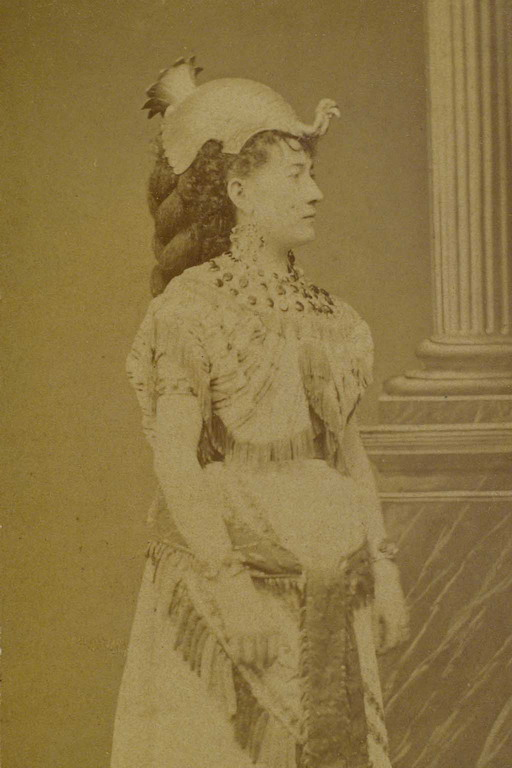
Maria Waldmann as Amneris in Aida, Parma, 1872

Maria Waldmann (19 November 1845 – 6 November 1920) was an Austrian mezzo-soprano who had a noted association with Giuseppe Verdi.

She was born in Vienna, then part of the Austrian Empire in 1845 and studied with Francesco Lamperti. She dedicated herself to the Italian mezzo-soprano repertoire. She was heard with Teresa Stolz in September 1869 in a production of Don Carlo in Trieste. Thereafter she sang in Moscow and at La Scala, Milan where, in 1871-2, she appeared in both La forza del destino and as Amneris in the European premiere of Aida (8 February 1872). Despite Verdi's initial reluctance to engage Waldmann for that premiere, she became his favorite Amneris.

In 1874, he again used her for the mezzo-soprano role in his Requiem, for which he wrote the Liber scriptus with her voice in mind. Verdi particularly valued her for the rich, dark color of her lower, contralto register. Verdi exploits that to great effect in the Liber scriptus, which focusses on the mid- and low-registers of the mezzo-soprano range.

Waldmann retired from the stage at age 31 after marrying Duke Galeazzo Massari. She lived with him at Palazzo Massari on Corso Parto Mare in Ferrara. After her retirement, she enjoyed Verdi's and his wife's affection for many years thereafter and she maintained a long correspondence with Verdi, almost until his death.

Her husband died in 1902, and she died in 1920, in Ferrara.

== Sources ==
- Eric Blom, Grove's Dictionary of Music and Musicians, 5th ed. 1954
- Parish register
