= Requiem (Verdi) =

1874 musical setting of the funeral mass

Messa da Requiem
- Requiem by Giuseppe Verdi
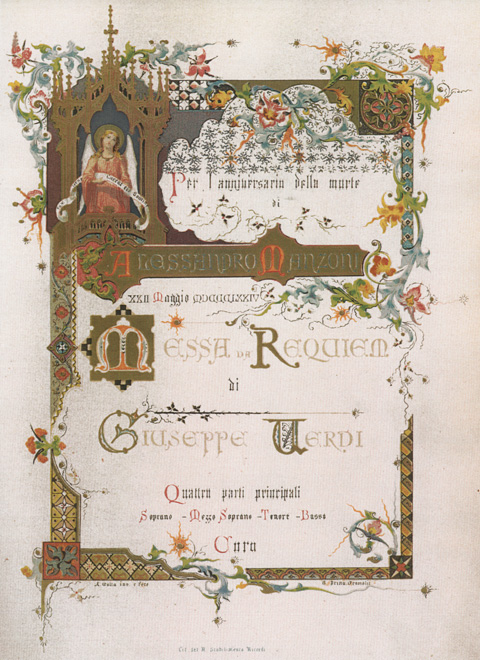
- First edition title page, Ricordi, 1874
- Related: Messa per Rossini
- Occasion: In memory of Alessandro Manzoni
- Text: Requiem
- Language: Latin
- Performed: 22 May 1874
- Scoring: four soloists; double choir; orchestra

The Messa da Requiem is a musical setting of the Catholic funeral mass (Requiem) for four soloists, double choir and orchestra by Giuseppe Verdi. It was composed in memory of Alessandro Manzoni, whom Verdi admired, and is therefore also referred to as the Manzoni Requiem. The first performance, at the San Marco church in Milan on 22 May 1874, conducted by the composer, marked the first anniversary of Manzoni's death. It was followed three days later by the same performers at La Scala. Verdi conducted his work at major venues in Europe.

Verdi composed the music for the last part of the text, Libera me, first, as his contribution to the Messa per Rossini, which he had begun after Gioachino Rossini had died.

Considered too operatic to be performed in a liturgical setting, the Requiem is usually given in concert form; a performance lasts around 90 minutes. Musicologist David Rosen calls it "probably the most frequently performed major choral work composed after Mozart's Requiem".

== Composition history ==
After Gioachino Rossini's death in 1868, Verdi suggested to his publisher Ricordi that a number of Italian composers collaborate on a Requiem in Rossini's honour. He began the effort by submitting the concluding movement, the Libera me. During the next year a Messa per Rossini was compiled by Verdi and twelve other famous Italian composers of the time. The premiere was scheduled for 13 November 1869, the first anniversary of Rossini's death, but on 4 November, nine days before the premiere, the organising committee abandoned it. Verdi blamed this on the scheduled conductor, Angelo Mariani. He pointed to Mariani's lack of enthusiasm for the project, although in fact the conductor had been a part of the organising committee and did his best to support Verdi, this episode marked the beginning of the end of their friendship. The composition remained unperformed until 1988, when Helmuth Rilling premiered the complete Messa per Rossini in Stuttgart, Germany, presented at festivals and recorded.

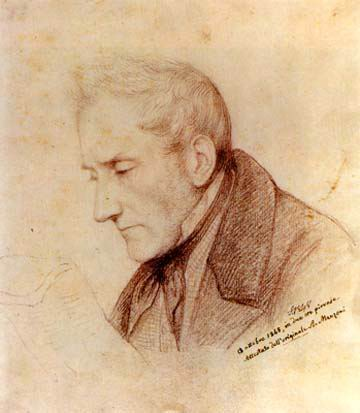
Alessandro Manzoni, in whose honour Verdi wrote the Requiem

On 22 May 1873, the Italian writer and humanist Alessandro Manzoni, whom Verdi had admired all his adult life and met in 1868, died. Upon hearing of his death, Verdi resolved to complete a Requiem—this time entirely of his own writing—for Manzoni. Verdi traveled to Paris in June, where he commenced work on the Requiem, giving it the form we know today. It included a revised version of the Libera me originally composed for Rossini.

== Performance history ==
=== 19th century ===
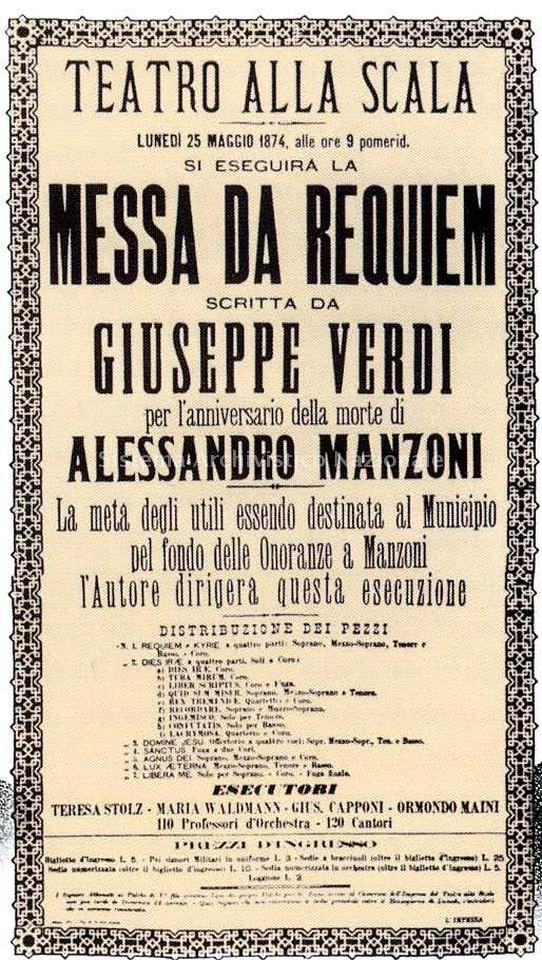
Requiem poster for La Scala premiere, 1874

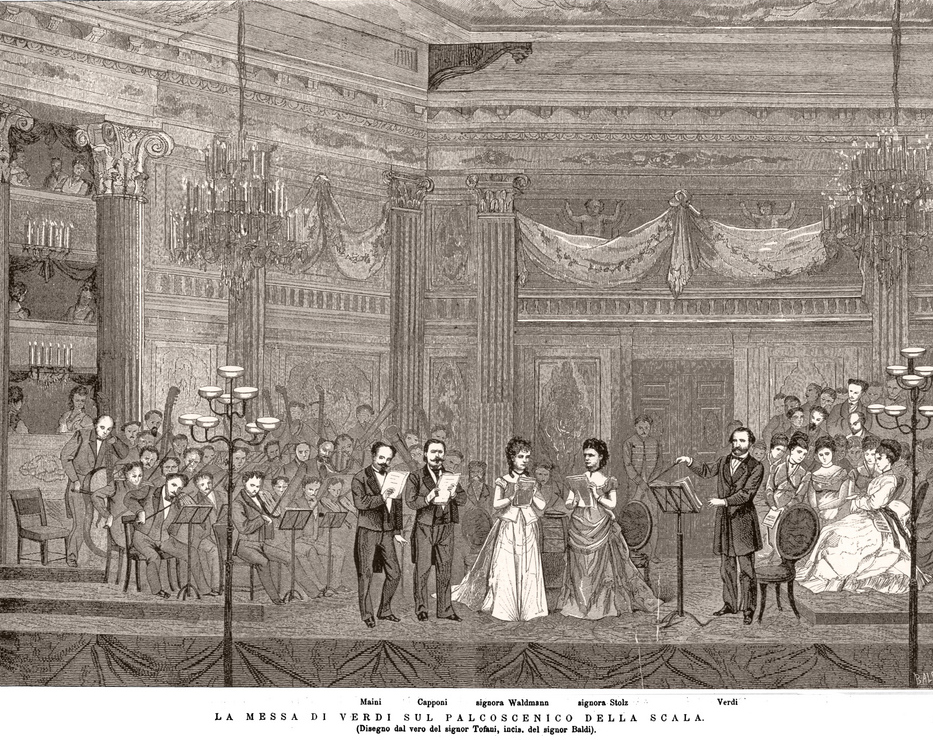
Second performance, at La Scala on 25 May 1874, with Verdi conducting. The soloists depicted are (left to right) Ormondo Maini, Giuseppe Capponi, Maria Waldmann, and Teresa Stolz

The Requiem was first performed in the church of San Marco in Milan on 22 May 1874, the first anniversary of Manzoni's death, as part of a church liturgy. Verdi himself conducted, and the four soloists were Teresa Stolz (soprano), Maria Waldmann (mezzo-soprano), Giuseppe Capponi (tenor) and Ormondo Maini (bass).

As Aida, Amneris and Ramfis respectively, Stolz, Waldmann, and Maini had all sung in the European premiere of Aida in 1872, and Capponi was also intended to sing the role of Radames at that premiere but was replaced due to illness. Teresa Stolz went on to a brilliant career, Waldmann retired very young in 1875, but the male singers appear to have faded into obscurity. Also, Teresa Stolz was engaged to Angelo Mariani in 1869, but she later left him.

The Requiem was repeated at La Scala three days later on 25 May with the same soloists and Verdi again conducting. It won immediate contemporary success, although not everywhere. It received seven performances at the Opéra-Comique in Paris, but the new Royal Albert Hall in London could not be filled for such a Catholic occasion. In Venice, impressive Byzantine ecclesiastical decor was designed for the occasion of the performance.

Its first performance in the United States was in Boston in 1878, by the Handel and Haydn Society.

It later disappeared from the standard choral repertoire, but made a reappearance in the 1930s and is now regularly performed and a staple of many choral societies.

=== 20th century and beyond ===
The Requiem was reportedly performed approximately 16 times between 1943 and 1944 by prisoners in the concentration camp of Theresienstadt (also known as Terezín) under the direction of Rafael Schächter. The performances were presented under the auspices of the Freizeitgestaltung, a cultural organization in the Ghetto.

Since the 1990s, commemorations in the US and Europe have included memorial performances of the Requiem in honor of the Terezín performances. On the heels of previous performances held at the Terezín Memorial, Murry Sidlin performed the Requiem in Terezin in 2006 and rehearsed the choir in the same basement where the original inmates reportedly rehearsed. Part of the Prague Spring Festival, two children of survivors sang in the choir with their parents sitting in the audience.

The Requiem has been staged in a variety of ways several times. Achim Freyer created a production for the Deutsche Oper Berlin in 2006 that was revived in 2007, 2011 and 2013. In Freyer's staging, the four sung roles, "Der Weiße Engel" (The White Angel), "Der Tod-ist-die-Frau" (Death is the Woman), "Einsam" (Solitude), and "Der Beladene" (The Load Bearer) are complemented by choreographed allegorical characters.

In 2011, Oper Köln premiered a full staging by Clemens Bechtel where the four main characters were shown in different life and death situations: the Fukushima nuclear disaster, a Turkish writer in prison, a young woman with bulimia, and an aid worker in Africa.

In 2021, the New York Metropolitan Opera performed the Requiem for the 20th anniversary of the September 11 attacks.

In 2025, the Dallas Symphony Orchestra and the Dallas Symphony Chorus, under the baton of JoAnn Falletta, performed the Requiem as part of the 2025 American Choral Directors Association National Conference.

=== Versions and arrangements ===
For a Paris performance, Verdi revised the "Liber scriptus" to allow Maria Waldmann a further solo for future performances. Previously, the movement had been set as a choral fugue in a classical Baroque style. With its premiere at the Royal Albert Hall performance in May 1875, this revision became the definitive edition that has been most performed since, although the original version is included in critical editions of the work published by Bärenreiter and University of Chicago Press.

Franz Liszt transcribed the Agnus Dei for solo piano (S. 437). It has been recorded by Leslie Howard.

Carus-Verlag published a version in 2013 for a small ensemble of horn, double bass, gran cassa, timpani, marimba and piano, edited by Michael Betzner-Brandt, in order to make the music accessible for more choirs.

== Structure ==
Verdi structured the liturgical text in movements as follows; Differently from traditional settings of the Requiem mass, he assigned several parts to one soloist. He also wrote duets such as Recordare, Lacrymosa and Agnus Dei, and a quartet of solo voices in the Domine Jesu Christe in the offertory.

- 1. Requiem
  - Introit (chorus)
  - Kyrie (soloists, chorus)
- 2. Dies irae
  - Dies irae (chorus)
  - Tuba mirum (chorus)
  - Mors stupebit (bass)
  - Liber scriptus (mezzo-soprano, chorus – chorus only in original version)
  - Quid sum miser (soprano, mezzo-soprano, tenor)
  - Rex tremendae (soloists, chorus)
  - Recordare (soprano, mezzo-soprano)
  - Ingemisco (tenor)
  - Confutatis maledictis (bass, chorus)
  - Lacrymosa (soloists, chorus)
- 3. Offertory (soloists)
- 4. Sanctus (double chorus)
- 5. Agnus Dei (soprano, mezzo-soprano, chorus)
- 6. Lux aeterna (mezzo-soprano, tenor, bass)
- 7. Libera me (soprano, chorus)

== Music ==
Throughout the work, Verdi used vigorous rhythms, sublime melodies, and dramatic contrasts—much as he did in his operas—to express the powerful emotions engendered by the text.

=== Movements ===
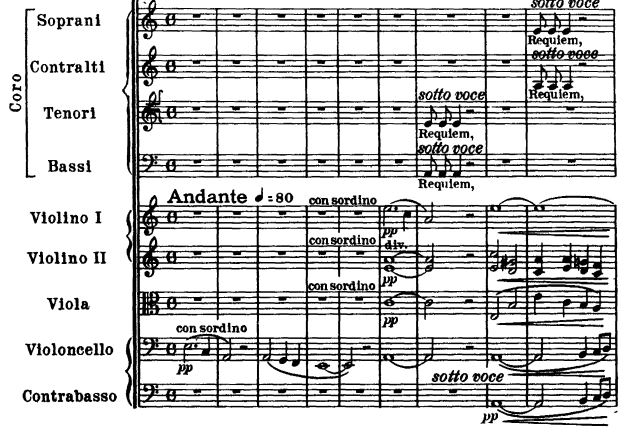
Beginning of the Introit

The work begins with the introit, with muted cellos and later all strings playing a slow descending motif in A minor, into which the choir mutters in low register the prayer for eternal rest. The soloists enter in turn for the Kyrie, with an "exalted theme which soars up over a chromatically descending bass".

The Dies irae begins, evoking Last Judgment in "thunderous chords, a jagged rising phrase, a wailing chant lurching backwards and forwards, giant bass-drum blows on the offbeat, precipitous woodwind scales, strings tremolando, uprushes of violins, and rapid rhythmic figures splayed out by the trumpets". The terrifying and recognizable passage is repeated several times, within the section and in the final Libera me. The four orchestral trumpets are augmented by an offstage quartet to produce a call to judgement in the "Tuba mirum". "Liber scriptus" is a passionate mezzo-soprano solo. "Rex tremendae" alternates a "majestic dotted theme" - somewhat reminiscent of Mozart's own setting - for the lower voices with a "wide-spanned phrase" "Salva Me", building to a climax. "Ingemisco" is a lyrical tenor solo "with a moment of profound peace". "Confutatis", a bass solo of "dignity and resignation", pleads for God's mercy. After a return of Dies irae, "Lacrymosa" closes the sequence with a "desolate theme", repeated and each time orchestrated more densely, leading to a muted melancholic end. The final Amen, however, is sung as a G major chord, "like a revelation".

The Offertory is sung by the quartet of soloists.

The Sanctus, a complex eight-part fugue scored for double chorus, begins with a brassy fanfare to announce him "who comes in the name of the Lord". The orchestra plays animated accompaniment throughout the fugue. "Pleni sunt coeli" is a "serene version of the fugue subject", still to vivid strings.

For the Agnus Dei, soprano and mezzo-soprano sing a long theme unison in octaves without accompaniment. The movement consists of variations of this theme, harmonised in soft colours, with a calm counterpoint of three flutes, alternating between the soloists and the choir.

In "Lux aeterna", mezzo-soprano, tenor and bass sing alone, the mezzo-soprano beginning in B♭ major to a tremolo of divided violins, shimmering as a depiction of eternal light. It is answered by the bass in B♭ minor, with bassoons, trombones and tuba. The movement ends in a serene and hopeful mood.

In the "Libera me", the oldest music by Verdi in the Requiem, the soprano soloist interacts with the choir for the prayer "Deliver me, Lord, from eternal death ... when you will come to judge the world by fire". The soprano first recites the prayer invoking a mood of "terrible urgency". The choir murmurs, praying for salvation from everlasting death. The soprano interrupts, with accompaniment recalling the music of the Dies irae. In the following "Tremens factus", the soprano gasps breathless phrases above a dense texture of muted strings and low flutes. The "crashing chords" of the Dies irae break in, with the passage repeated completely. Then the choir repeats the very beginning, "Requiem aeternam", with the solo soprano joining softly. The soprano repeats the first "Libera me", calling the choir to an agitated four-part fugue that illustrates the shattering of the world by fire, with a "devastating climax". The soprano finally mutters a two-fold "Libera me" on a single low note, ever softer, interpreted as "a prayer as much for the living as for the dead".

=== Female voices ===
When the Requiem was composed, female singers were not permitted to perform in Catholic Church rituals (such as a requiem mass). However, from the beginning Verdi intended to use female singers in the work. In his open letter proposing the Requiem project (when it was still conceived as a multi-author Requiem for Rossini), Verdi wrote: "If I were in the good graces of the Holy Father—Pope Pius IX—I would beg him to permit—if only for this one time—that women take part in the performance of this music; but since I am not, it will fall to someone else better suited to obtain this decree." In Verdi's Requiem, two of the four soloists were women, and the chorus included female voices. This may have slowed the work's acceptance in Italy.

=== Reception ===
At the time of its premiere, the Requiem was criticized by some as being too operatic in style for the religious subject matter. According to Gundula Kreuzer, "Most critics did perceive a schism between the religious text (with all its musical implications) and Verdi's setting". Some viewed it negatively as "an opera in ecclesiastical robes", or alternatively, as a religious work, but one in "dubious musical costume". While the majority of critics agreed that the music was "dramatic", some felt that such treatment of the text was appropriate, or at least permissible. As to the quality of the music, the critical consensus agreed that the work displayed "fluent invention, beautiful sound effects and charming vocal writing". Critics were divided between praise and condemnation with respect to Verdi's willingness to break standard compositional rules for musical effect, such as his use of consecutive fifths.

== Instrumentation ==
The work is scored for four vocal soloists and a large orchestra comprising the following:

woodwind: 3 flutes (3rd doubling piccolo), 2 oboes, 2 clarinets, 4 bassoons
brass: 4 horns, 8 trumpets (4 offstage), 3 trombones, ophicleide (an obsolete instrument usually replaced by a tuba or cimbasso in modern performances)
percussion: timpani, bass drum (in addition to the standard orchestral bass drum, some performances, at the conductor's discretion, will utilise a so-called 'Verdi' bass drum, substantially larger than the standard orchestral variant, often reaching around 60 inches (150 centimetres) in diameter; this larger drum is used for the extremely soft rolls to give an especially spooky rumbling effect, whilst the regular bass drum is used for the louder passages, particularly in the 'Dies Irae' sections)
strings: violins I, II, violas, violoncellos, double basses.
