= Georges Parcq =

French architect

- Born: 1874; Pontlevoy, France
- Died: 1939 (aged 64–65); Cairo, Egypt
- Education: École des Beaux-Arts
- Occupation: Architect
- Years active: 1910 – 1939

Georges Parcq (1874–1939) was a French architect who worked in Cairo, Egypt from 1910 to 1939. Among his famous works are the Sednaoui Emporium department store in Cairo, the Alexandria Opera House, the Cairo Stock Exchange and the Villa Minost from 1931 in Cairo.

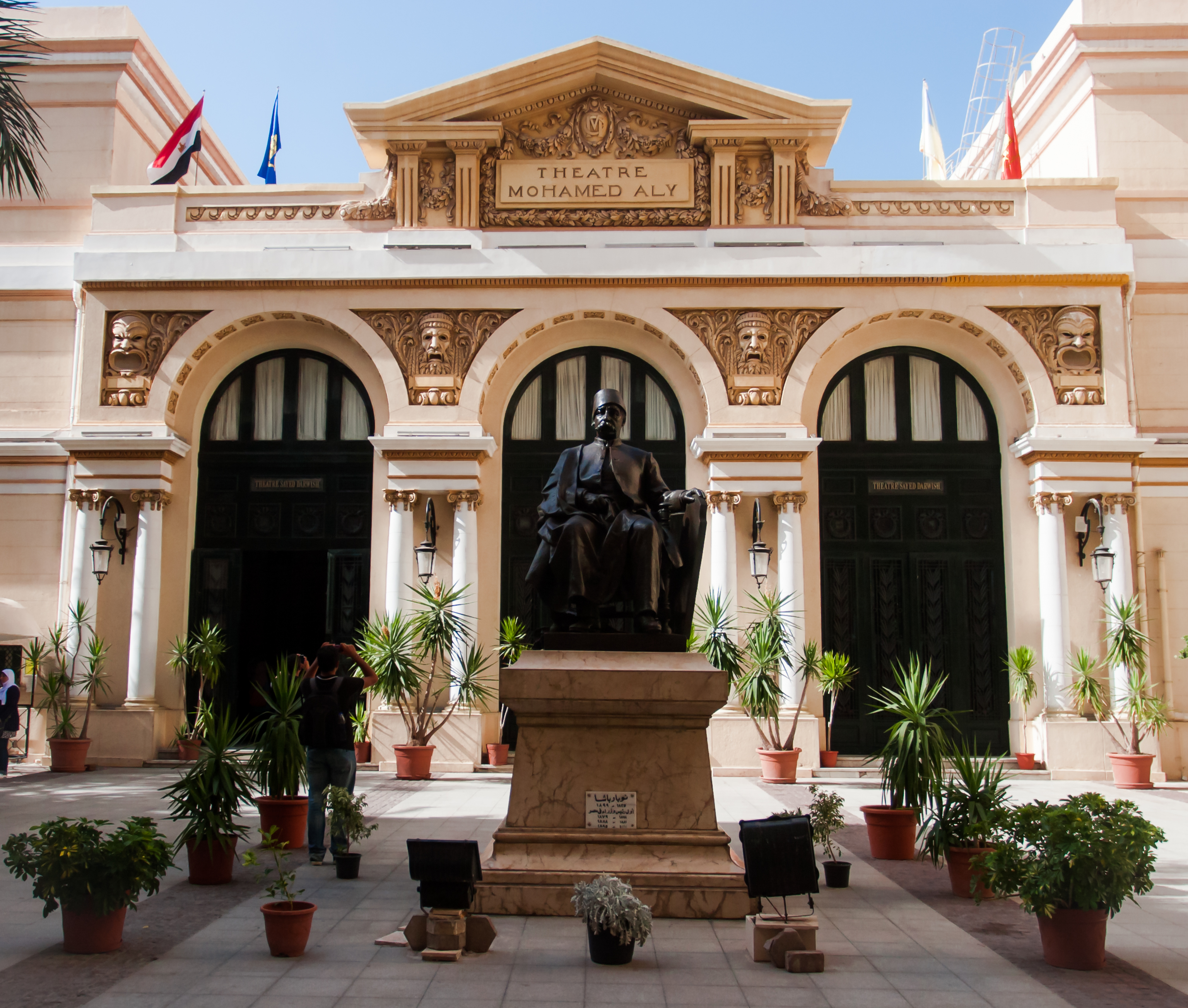
The Alexandria Opera House
