= Stephan Zizinia =

Belgian Consul General in Egypt

- Στέφανος Τσιντσίνιας
- Born: 1784; Chios
- Died: 1868 (aged 83–84); Alexandria
- Occupations: merchant; Consul General of Belgium in Egypt

Stephan or Stephanos Zizinia (Chios, 1784 – Alexandria, 1868) (French: Étienne Zizinia, Greek: Στέφανος Μενάνδρου Τσι(ν)τσίνια(ς), Stefanos Menander Tsintsinias or Tsitsinia) was a Greek merchant based in Alexandria, active throughout the Mediterranean region. He served as Consul General of Belgium in Egypt, and his name is associated with a number of Egyptian antiquities found in European collections.

== Life and work ==
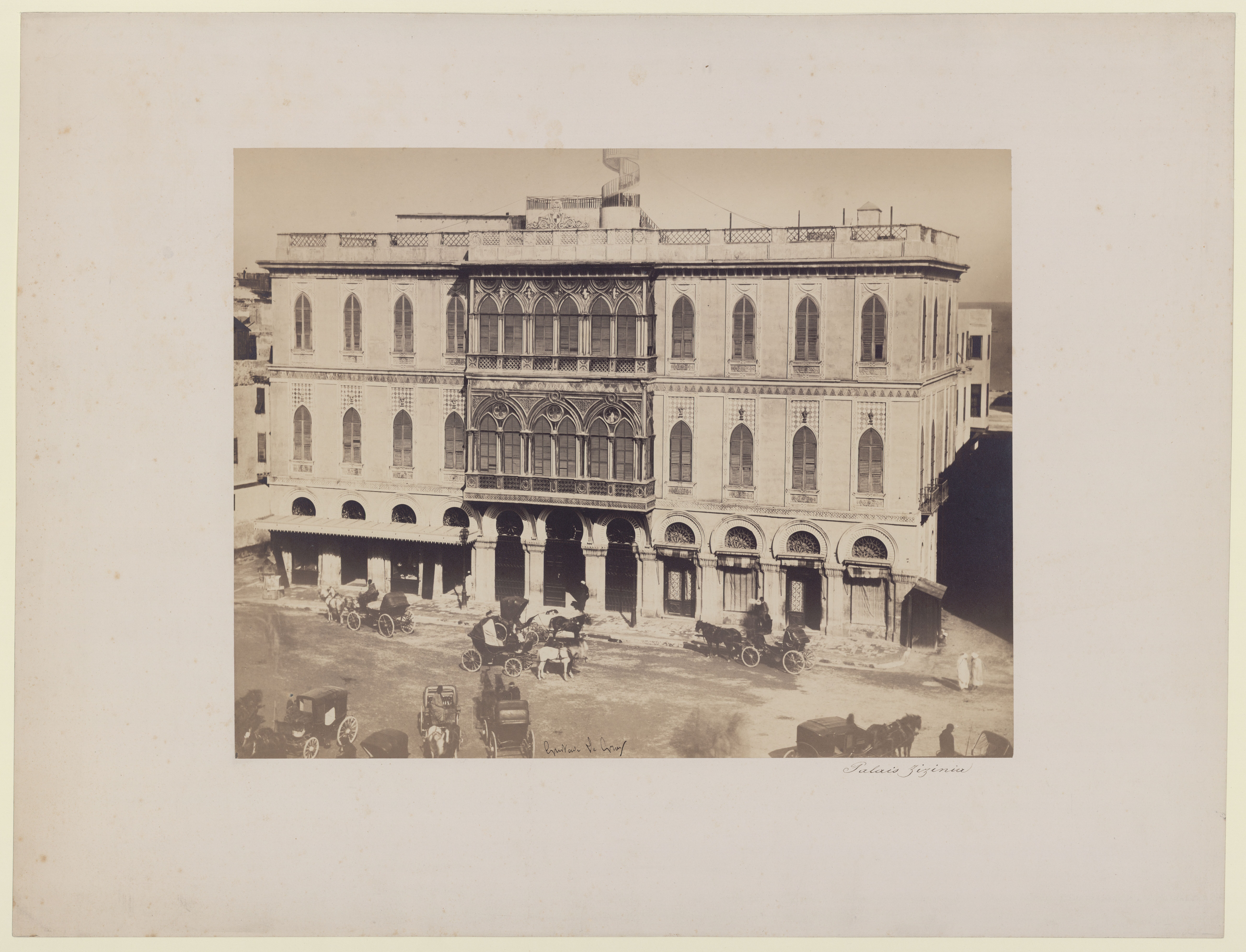
Okelle Zizinia, 1862 (photograph by Gustave Le Gray).

In 1816, the brothers Stephan and Pandia Zizinia settled in Marseille, where they founded a trading company. In 1820, their brother George joined the enterprise, which became known from 1822 as Société Zizinia Frères. In 1831, Zizinia took French nationality.

The company operated branches in several other Mediterranean port cities, Alexandria being the most important. Zizinia settled there at the invitation of Muhammad Ali Pasha, and built an okelle (semi-public building serving as city mansion, warehouse, and guest house) on the Place des Consuls.

Here, he assembled an extensive art collection that included Egyptian, Greek, Roman, and Etruscan antiquities; Chinese, Japanese, and Arab art, and paintings – including a Rembrandt, a Rubens, and a Van Dyck. The Okelle Zizinia became known as a meeting place for Alexandria's beau monde. He also commissioned the first theatre in Alexandria, the Zizinia Theatre, built by the Italian architect Pietro Avoscani.

In 1839, he was appointed Consul of Belgium in Egypt, and in 1847, Consul General. During two visits by the future king Leopold II of Belgium to Egypt, in 1855 and 1862–1863, Zizinia and his son Menander accompanied the prince and hosted him in their residences in Alexandria and Cairo. In 1866, he obtained Belgian nationality.

Zizinia was a leading figure of the Greek community in Alexandria. He occasionally traded in Egyptian and Greek antiquities and sometimes gifted items from his collection to associates. Between roughly 1880 and 1900, his son Menander sold off most of the collection, which is now dispersed – some important pieces are in museums, others in private hands.

== Honours ==
In 1847, Zizinia received the hereditary title of Count from Charles II, Duke of Parma. In 1849, he was awarded the hereditary title of Baron by King Leopold I of Belgium.

== Family and legacy ==
The Tsintsinias or Tsitsinia family of Chios was likely of Italian origin. The earliest mention of the family name on Chios dates from 1622; the lineage can be traced back to 1730.

Stephan Zizinia was the son of Menander "Meni" Zizinia (Μενής Στεφάνου Τσιτσίνιας; 1768–1822), who was hanged by Ottoman troops during the Chios massacre, and Angerou Ralli. His brother Giorgios served as Consul General of Greece in Marseille from 1833 until his death in 1868.

In 1825, Stephan married Katarina Skambali (1808–1891), from the Anastasi family of Thessaloniki. Their two eldest children, daughter Cléanthe (1828–1862) and son Menander (1832–1907), were born in Marseille; the two youngest, daughter Mariette (1835–1842) and son Jean (1838–?), in Alexandria. Son Menander succeeded his father in the family business and as Belgian consul.

The trading house Zizinia & Compagnie closed in 1876 following the bankruptcy of Egypt. The Okelle Zizinia was destroyed in the Bombardment of Alexandria in 1882. The Zizinia Theatre passed into other hands; it operated with 2,000 seats until its demolition in 1908. On the same site, the Teatro Muhammad Ali opened in 1918, renamed Sayed Darwish Theatre in 1962, and Alexandria Opera House in 2004.

The Zizinia district in Alexandria was built on land owned by Stephan Zizinia, which he sold for a tramline expansion.

Musical instruments acquired with his assistance are held in the collections of the Royal Museums of Art and History in Brussels.

== Sources ==
- Βασίλης Αγιαννίδης (Vasílis Agiannídis) (2019-10-19). "Η οικογένεια Τσιτσίνια ("The Tsitsinias family")". Απλωταριά. Η διαφορετική φωνή της Χίου ("Aplotaria. Chios' other voice") (in Greek).
- Bierbrier, Morris L. (2019). "ZIZINIA, (Count) Stephan (1794-1868)". Who Was Who in Egyptology (5 ed.). Londen: The Egypt Exploration Society. p. 508.
- Paris, Erato (2001). "Les Grecs de Marseille dans la deuxième moitié du XIXe siècle : une perspective nationale et transnationale" (pdf). Revue Européenne des Migrations Internationales (in French). 17 (3): 23–42.
- Petrocelli, Paolo (2020-06-06). "The origins of opera houses in Egypt". Medium.com.
- Warmenbol, Eugène (2018). "Étienne Zizinia (1784-1868), consul général de Belgique. Un grand collectionneur et mécène à Alexandrie d'Égypte". In Doyen, Florence; Preys, René; Quertinmont, Arnaud (eds.). Sur le chemin du Mouseion d'Alexandrie. Études offertes à Marie-Cécile Bruwier (CENiM 19) (in French). Montpellier: De Gruyter. pp. 327–348.
- Willaert, Saskia (2023). "Oud". mim.be (in French). Musée des instruments de musique.

== See also ==
- Greeks in Egypt
- Muhammad Ali dynasty
