= Aida =

1871 tragic opera by Giuseppe Verdi

- Opera by Giuseppe Verdi
- Cover of a very early vocal score, c. 1872
- Librettist: Antonio Ghislanzoni
- Language: Italian
- Premiere: 24 December 1871; Khedivial Opera House in Cairo

Aida (or Aïda, Italian: [aˈiːda]) is a tragic opera in four acts by Giuseppe Verdi to an Italian libretto by Antonio Ghislanzoni. Set in the Old Kingdom of Egypt, it was commissioned by Cairo's Khedivial Opera House and had its première there on 24 December 1871, in a performance conducted by Giovanni Bottesini. Today the work holds a central place in the operatic canon, receiving performances every year around the world. At New York's Metropolitan Opera alone, Aida has been sung more than 1,100 times since 1886. Ghislanzoni's scheme follows a scenario often attributed to the French Egyptologist Auguste Mariette, but Verdi biographer Mary Jane Phillips-Matz argues that the source is actually Temistocle Solera.

== Elements of the opera's genesis and sources ==
Isma'il Pasha, Khedive of Egypt, commissioned Verdi to write an opera to celebrate the opening of the Suez Canal, but Verdi declined. However, Auguste Mariette, a French Egyptologist, proposed to Khedive Pasha a plot for a celebratory opera set in ancient Egypt. Khedive Pasha referred Mariette to theatre manager Camille du Locle, who sent Mariette's story idea to Verdi. Eventually, Verdi agreed to compose an opera based on that story, for 150,000 francs.

Because the scenery and costumes were stuck in the French capital during the Siege of Paris (1870–71) of the ongoing Franco-Prussian War, the premiere was delayed and Verdi's Rigoletto was performed instead. The first opera performed at the Khedivial Opera House, Aida eventually premiered in Cairo on 24 December 1871.

== Performance history ==
=== Cairo premiere and initial success in Italy ===
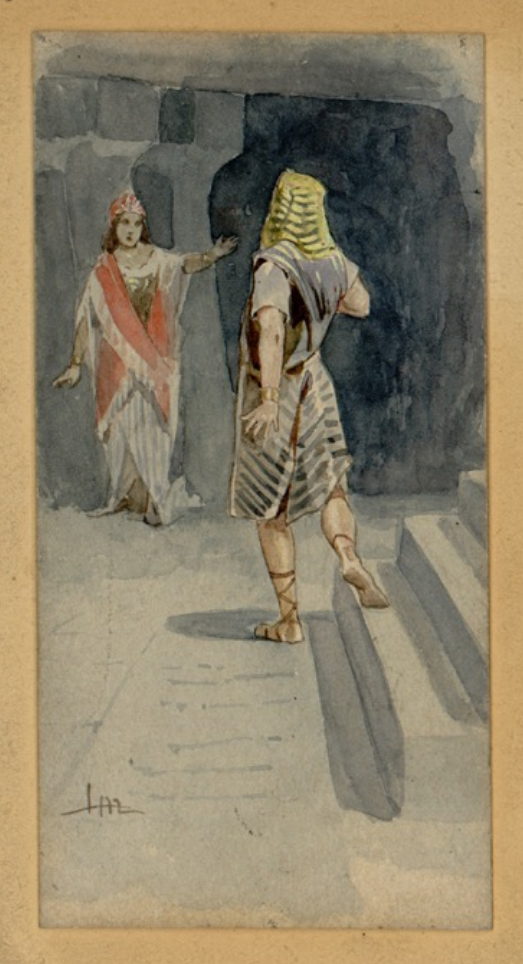
Radamès (Giuseppe Fancelli) and Aida (Teresa Stolz) in act 4, scene 2 of the 1872 La Scala European première (drawing by Leopoldo Metlicovitz)

Verdi originally chose to write a brief orchestral prelude instead of a full overture for the opera. He then composed an overture of the "potpourri" variety to replace the original prelude. However, in the end he decided not to have the overture performed because of its—his own words—"pretentious silliness". This overture, never used today, was given a rare broadcast performance by Arturo Toscanini and the NBC Symphony Orchestra on 30 March 1940, but was never commercially issued.

Aida met with great acclaim when it finally opened in Cairo on 24 December 1871. The costumes and accessories for the première were designed by Auguste Mariette, who also oversaw the design and construction of the sets, which were made in Paris by the Opéra's scene painters Auguste-Alfred Rubé and Philippe Chaperon (acts 1 and 4) and Édouard Desplechin and Jean-Baptiste Lavastre (acts 2 and 3), and shipped to Cairo. Although Verdi did not attend the premiere in Cairo, he was most dissatisfied with the fact that the audience consisted of invited dignitaries, politicians and critics, but no members of the general public. He therefore considered the Italian (and European) première, held at La Scala, Milan on 8 February 1872, and a performance in which he was heavily involved at every stage, to be its real première.

Verdi had also written the role of Aida for the voice of Teresa Stolz, who sang it for the first time at the Milan première. Verdi had asked her fiancé, Angelo Mariani, to conduct the Cairo première, but he declined, so Giovanni Bottesini filled the gap. The Milan Amneris, Maria Waldmann, was his favourite in the role and she repeated it a number of times at his request.

Aida was received with great enthusiasm at its Milan première. The opera was soon mounted at major opera houses throughout Italy, including the Teatro Regio di Parma (20 April 1872), the Teatro di San Carlo (30 March 1873), La Fenice (11 June 1873), the Teatro Regio di Torino (26 December 1874), the Teatro Comunale di Bologna (30 September 1877, with Giuseppina Pasqua as Amneris and Franco Novara as the King), and the Teatro Costanzi (8 October 1881, with Theresia Singer as Aida and Giulia Novelli as Amneris) among others.

Despite this acclaim, by the early 1870s Aida had also drawn charges of being simultaneously old-fashioned and imitative of newer trends, criticism that contributed to Verdi's growing disillusionment with the Italian operatic establishment during this period.

=== Other 19th-century performances ===
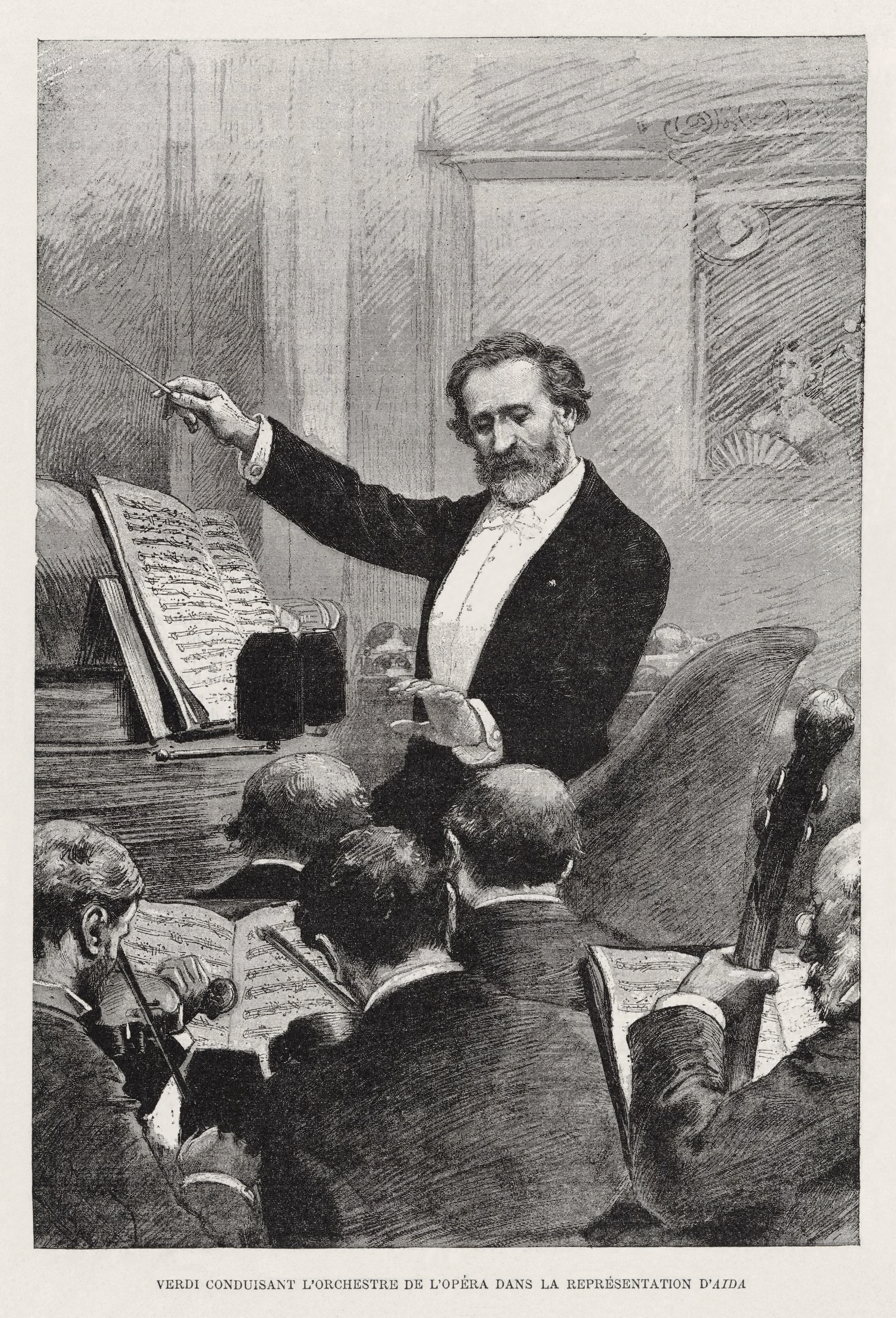
Verdi conducting the 1880 Paris Opera premiere

Details of important national and other premières of Aida follow:

- Argentina: 4 October 1873, at the original Teatro Colón, Buenos Aires, located at Rivadavia and Reconquista, then replaced by the headquarters of the Bank of the Argentine Nation.
- United States: 26 November 1873, Academy of Music in New York City, with Ostava Torriani in the title role, Annie Louise Cary as Amneris, Italo Campanini as Radamès, Victor Maurel as Amonasro, and Evasio Scolara as the King; the conductor was Verdi's friend and student Emanuele Muzio.
- Germany: 20 April 1874, Berlin State Opera, with Mathilde Mallinger as Aida, Albert Niemann as Radamès, and Franz Betz as Amonasro
- Austria: 29 April 1874, Vienna State Opera, with Amalie Materna as Amneris
- Hungary: 10 April 1875, Hungarian State Opera House, Budapest
- France: 22 April 1876, Théâtre-Lyrique Italien, Salle Ventadour, Paris, with almost the same cast as the Milan premiere, but with Édouard de Reszke making his debut as the King. The elaborate production was mounted by Verdi's French music publisher, Léon Escudier, and the performance was conducted by Verdi.
- United Kingdom: 22 June 1876, Royal Opera House, Covent Garden, with Adelina Patti as Aida, Ernesto Nicolini as Radamès, and Francesco Graziani as Amonasro
- Australia: 6 September 1877, Royal Theatre, Melbourne
- Munich: 1877, Bavarian State Opera, with Josephine Schefsky as Amneris
- Mexico: September 1877, Gran Teatro Nacional, with Angela Peralta as Aida, Giuseppe Frapolli as Radamès,Fanny Natali as Amneris and Giuseppe Villani as Amonasro (La Voz de Mexico)
- Stockholm: 16 February 1880, Royal Swedish Opera in Swedish, with Selma Ek in the title role
- Palais Garnier, Paris: 22 March 1880, sung in French, with Gabrielle Krauss as Aida, Rosine Bloch as Amnéris, Henri Sellier as Radamès, Victor Maurel as Amonasro, Georges-François Menu as the King, and Auguste Boudouresque as Ramphis.
- Metropolitan Opera, New York: 12 November 1886, conducted by Anton Seidl, with Therese Herbert-Förster (the wife of Victor Herbert) in the title role, Carl Zobel as Radamès, Marianne Brandt as Amneris, Adolf Robinson as Amonasro, Emil Fischer as Ramfis, and Georg Sieglitz as the King.
- Rio de Janeiro: 30 June 1886, Theatro D. Pedro II. During rehearsals, the performers of the Italian touring opera company had disagreements with the local conductor Leopoldo Miguez, described as "inept". After the failure of two replacement conductors, Arturo Toscanini, at the time a 19-year-old cellist who was assistant chorus master, was persuaded to conduct the performance. He conducted the opera from memory with great success.

=== 20th century and beyond ===
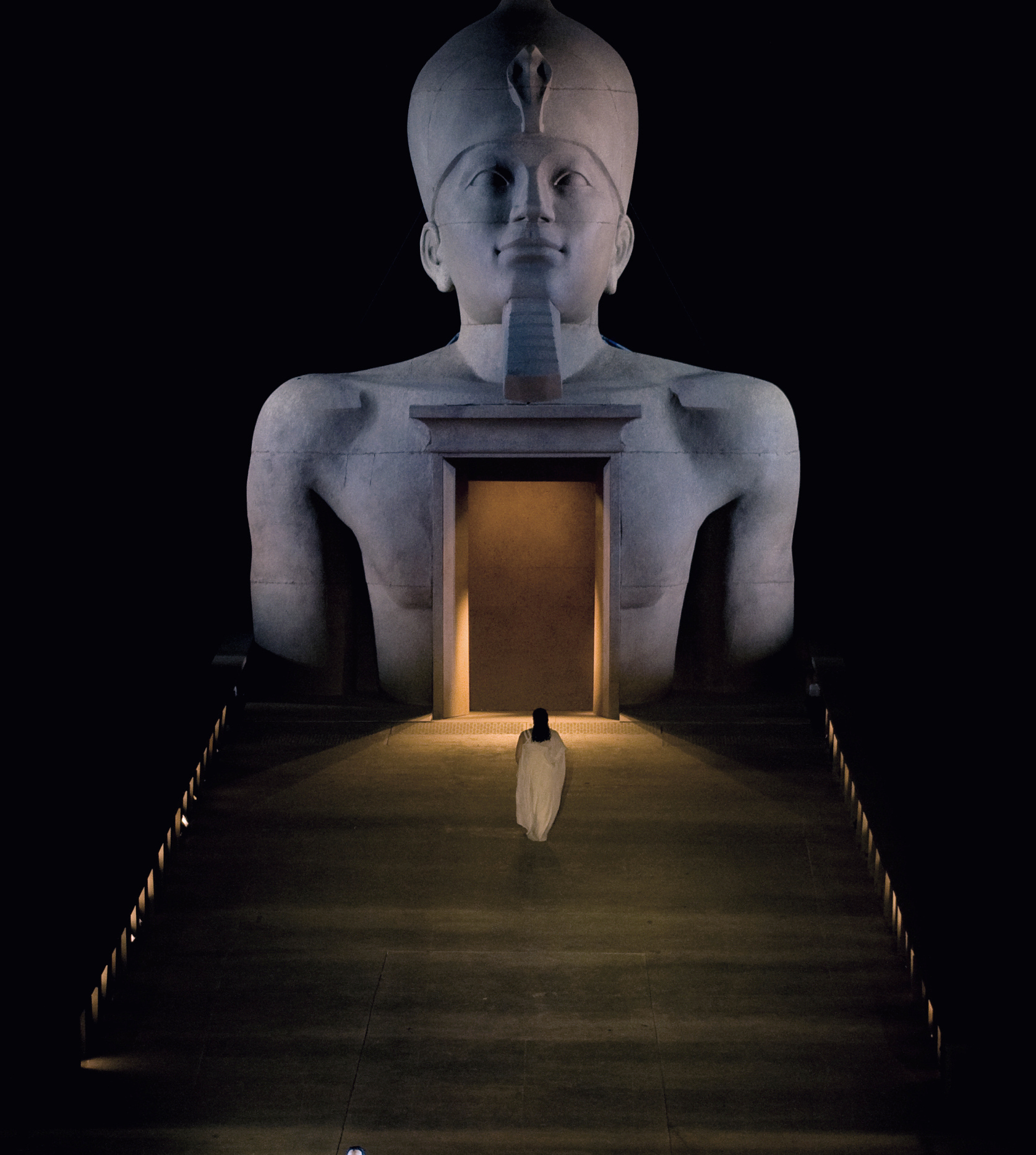
A scene from the Israeli Opera production performed at Masada in 2011

A complete concert version of the opera was given in New York City in 1949. Conducted by Toscanini with Herva Nelli as Aida and Richard Tucker as Radamès, it was televised on the NBC television network. Due to the length of the opera, it was divided into two telecasts, preserved on kinescopes, and later released on video by RCA and Testament. The audio portion of the broadcast, including some remakes in June 1954, was released on LP and CD by RCA Victor. Other notable performances from this period include a 1955 performance conducted by Tullio Serafin with Maria Callas as Aida and Richard Tucker as Radamès and a 1959 performance conducted by Herbert von Karajan with Renata Tebaldi as Aida and Carlo Bergonzi as Radamès.

La Scala mounted a lavish new production of Aida designed by Franco Zeffirelli for the opening night of its 2006/2007 season. The production starred Violeta Urmana in the title role and Roberto Alagna as Radamès. Alagna subsequently made the headlines when he was booed for his rendition of "Celeste Aida" during the second performance, walked off the stage, and was dismissed from the remainder of the run. The production continued to cause controversy in 2014 when Zeffirelli protested at La Scala's rental of the production to the Astana Opera House in Kazakhstan without his permission. According to Zeffirelli, the move had doomed his production to an "infamous and brutal" fate. Aida continues to be a staple of the standard operatic repertoire. It is frequently performed in the Verona Arena, and is a staple of its renowned opera festival.

== Roles ==
Roles, voice types, premier cast
Role	Voice type	Premiere cast, 24 December 1871 Cairo Conductor: Giovanni Bottesini	European premiere 8 February 1872 La Scala, Milan Conductor: Franco Faccio
Aida, an Ethiopian princess	soprano	Antonietta Anastasi-Pozzoni	Teresa Stolz
The King of Egypt	bass	Tommaso Costa	Paride Pavoleri
Amneris, daughter of the Pharaoh	mezzo-soprano	Eleonora Grossi	Maria Waldmann
Radamès, Captain of the Guard	tenor	Pietro Mongini	Giuseppe Fancelli
Amonasro, King of Ethiopia	baritone	Francesco Steller	Francesco Pandolfini
Ramfis, High Priest	bass	Paolo Medini	Ormоndo Maini
A messenger	tenor	Luigi Stecchi-Bottardi	Luigi Vistarini
Voice of the High Priestess	soprano	Marietta Allievi	
Priests, priestesses, ministers, captains, soldiers, officials, Ethiopians, slaves and prisoners, Egyptians, animals and chorus

== Instrumentation ==
3 flutes, 3 flûtes d'amour, (3rd also piccolo), 2 oboes, English horn, 2 clarinets, bass clarinet, 2 bassoons, 4 horns, 2 trumpets, 3 trombones, cimbasso, timpani, triangle, bass drum, cymbals, tam-tam, harp, strings; on-stage banda: 6 Egyptian trumpets, military band, harp

== Setting ==
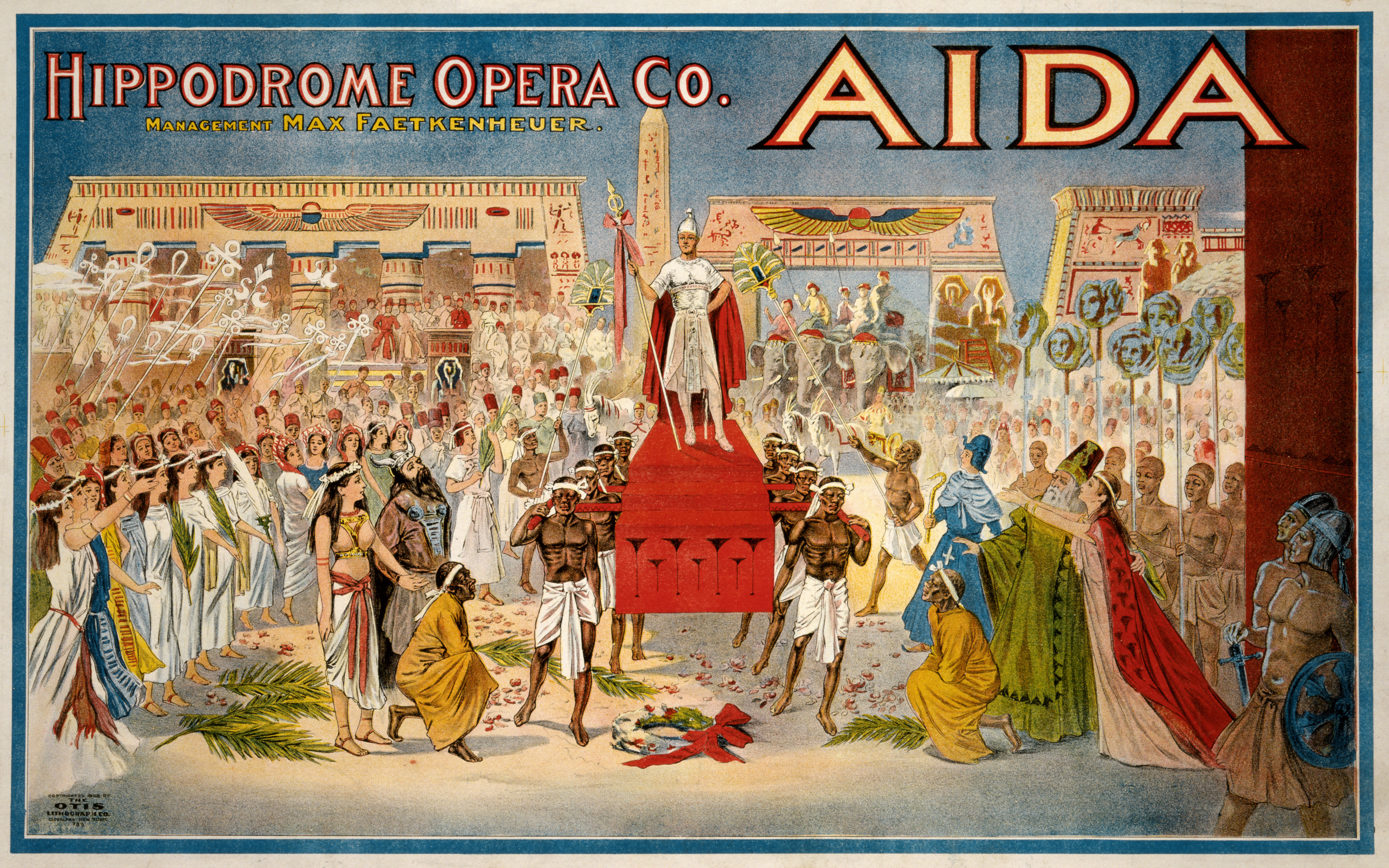
Poster for a 1908 production in Cleveland, showing the triumphal scene in act 2, scene 2

The libretto does not specify a precise time period, so it is difficult to place the opera more specifically than the Old Kingdom. For the first production, Mariette went to great efforts to make the sets and costumes authentic. Considering the consistent artistic styles throughout the 3000-year history of ancient Egypt, a given production does not particularly need to choose a specific time period within the larger frame of ancient Egyptian history.

== Synopsis ==
Backstory: The Egyptians have captured and enslaved Aida, an Ethiopian princess. An Egyptian military commander, Radamès, struggles to choose between his love for her and his loyalty to the King of Egypt. To complicate the story further, the King's daughter Amneris is in love with Radamès, although he does not return her feelings.

=== Act 1 ===
Scene 1: A hall in the King's palace

Ramfis, the high priest of Egypt, tells Radamès, the young warrior, that war with the Ethiopians seems inevitable, and Radamès hopes that he will be chosen as the Egyptian commander by the Gods (Ramfis, Radamès: "Sì, corre voce l'Etiope ardisca" / Yes, it is rumoured that Ethiopia dares once again to threaten our power).

Radamès dreams both of gaining victory on the battlefield and of Aida, an Ethiopian slave, with whom he is secretly in love (Radamès: "Se quel guerrier io fossi! ... Celeste Aida" / Heavenly Aida). Aida, who is also secretly in love with Radamès, is the captured daughter of the Ethiopian King Amonasro, but her Egyptian captors are unaware of her true identity. Her father has invaded Egypt to deliver her from servitude.

Amneris, the daughter of the Egyptian King, enters the hall. She too loves Radamès, but fears that his heart belongs to someone else (Radamès, Amneris: "Quale insolita gioia nel tuo sguardo" / What an unusual joy is in your gaze!).

Aida appears and, when Radamès sees her, Amneris notices that he looks disturbed. She suspects that Aida could be her rival, but is able to hide her jealousy and approach Aida (Amneris, Aida, Radamès: "Vieni, o diletta, appressati" / Come, O delight, come closer).

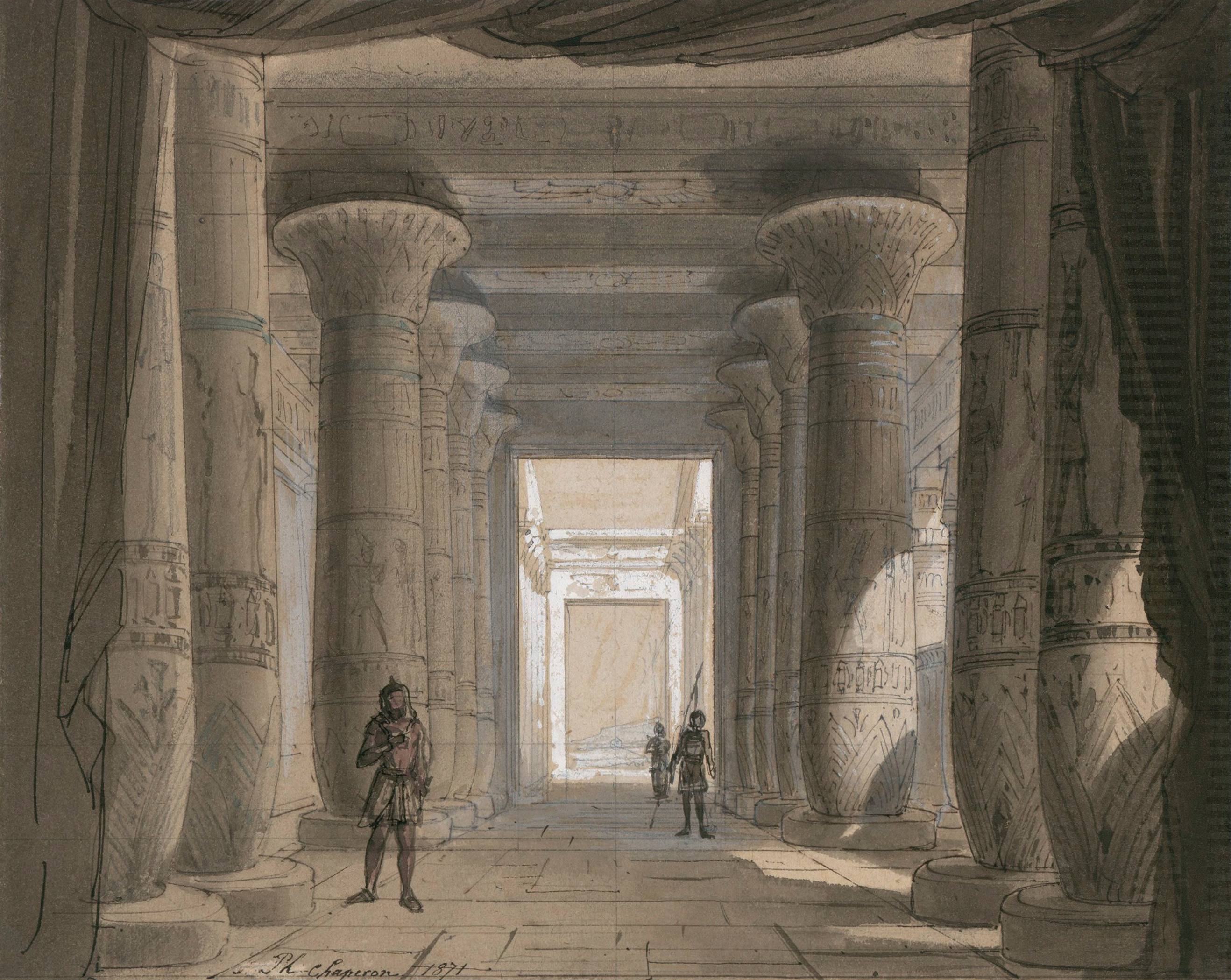
Set design by Philippe Chaperon for act 1, scene 2 at the Cairo première

The King enters, along with the High Priest, Ramfis, and the whole palace court. A messenger announces that the Ethiopians, led by King Amonasro, are marching towards Thebes. The King declares war and proclaims that Radamès is the man chosen by the goddess Isis to be the leader of the army (The King, Messenger, Radamès, Aida, Amneris, Ramfis, chorus: "Alta cagion v'aduna .. Guerra, guerra, guerra!" / Oh fate o'er Egypt looming .. War, war, war!). Upon receiving this mandate from the King, Radamès proceeds to the temple of Vulcan to take up the sacred arms (The King, Radamès, Aida, Amneris, chorus: "Su! del Nilo al sacro lido" .. (reprise) "Guerra, guerra, guerra!" / On! to the sacred shores of the Nile.. (reprise) War, war, war!).

Alone in the hall, Aida feels torn between her love for her father, her country, and Radamès (Aida: "Ritorna vincitor!" / Return a conqueror!).

Scene 2: Inside the Temple of Ptah

Solemn ceremonies and dances by the priestesses take place (High Priestess, chorus, Radamès: "Possente Ptah ... Tu che dal nulla" / O mighty Ptah). This is followed by the installation of Radamès to the office of commander-in-chief (High Priestess, chorus, Ramfis, Radamès: "Immenso Ptah.. Mortal, diletto ai Numi" / O mighty one, guard and protect!). All present in the temple pray fervently for the victory of Egypt and protection for their warriors ("Nume, custode e vindice"/ Hear us, O guardian deity).

=== Act 2 ===
Scene 1: The chamber of Amneris

Dances and music to celebrate Radamès' victory take place (Chorus, Amneris: "Chi mai fra gli inni e i plausi" / Our songs his glory praising). However, Amneris is still in doubt about Radamès' love and wonders whether Aida is in love with him. She tries to forget her doubt, entertaining her worried heart with the dance of Moorish slaves (Chorus, Amneris: "Vieni: sul crin ti piovano" / Come bind your flowing tresses).

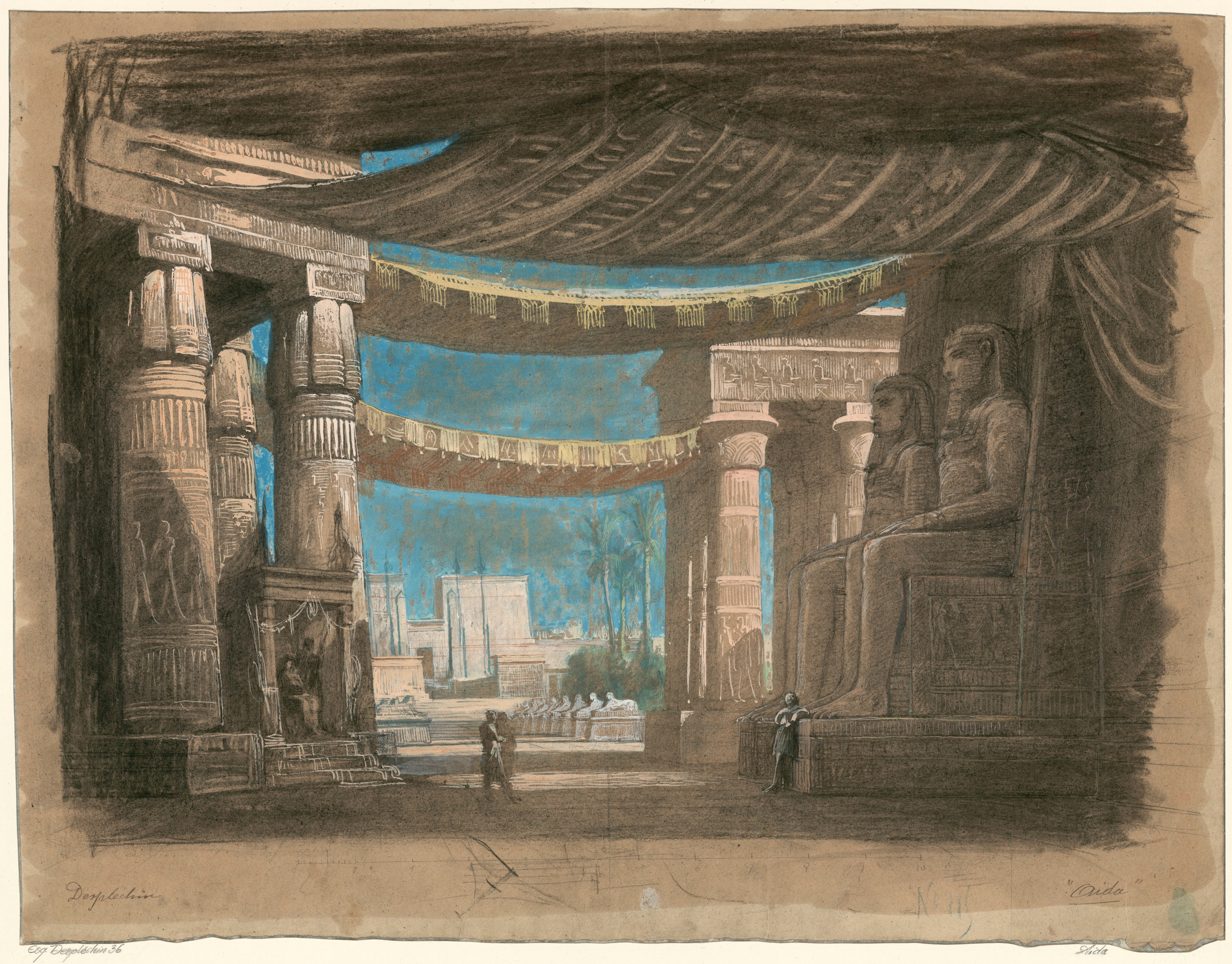
Act 2, scene 2, set design for the Cairo premiere by Édouard Desplechin

When Aida enters the chamber, Amneris asks everyone to leave. By falsely telling Aida that Radamès has died in the battle, she tricks her into professing her love for him. In grief, and shocked by the news, Aida confesses that her heart belongs to Radamès eternally (Amneris, Aida: "Fu la sorte dell'armi a' tuoi funesta" / The battle's outcome was cruel for your people).

Grand March from act 2, scene 2
Recorded in 2002 by the U.S. Marine Band (5:08) (The ballet music (≈ 5 mins) has been cut out, and the ending has been extended with the act 2 finale.)

This confession fires Amneris with rage, and she plans on taking revenge on Aida. Ignoring Aida's pleadings (Amneris, Aida, chorus: "Su! del Nilo al sacro lido" / On! to the sacred shores of the Nile), Amneris leaves her alone in the chamber.

Scene 2: The grand gate of the city of Thebes

Radamès returns victorious and the troops march into the city (Chorus, Ramfis: "Gloria all'Egitto, ad Iside" / Glory to Egypt, [and] to Isis!).

The Egyptian king decrees that on this day the triumphant Radamès may have anything he wishes. The Ethiopian captives are led onstage in chains, Amonasro among them. Aida immediately rushes to her father, who whispers to her to conceal his true identity as King of Ethiopia from the Egyptians. Amonasro deceptively proclaims to the Egyptians that the Ethiopian king (referring to himself) has been slain in battle. Aida, Amonasro, and the captured Ethiopians plead with the Egyptian King for mercy, but Ramfis and the Egyptian priests call for their death (Aida, Amneris, Radamès, The King, Amonasro, chorus: "Che veggo! .. Egli? .. Mio padre! .. Anch'io pugnai .. Struggi, o Re, queste ciurme feroci" / What do I see?.. Is it he? My father? .. Destroy, O King, these ferocious creatures).

Claiming the reward promised by the King of Egypt, Radamès pleads with him to spare the lives of the prisoners and to set them free. The King grants Radamès' wish, and declares that he (Radamès) will be his (the King's) successor and will marry the King's daughter (Amneris). (Aida, Amneris, Radamès, Ramfis, The King, Amonasro, chorus: "O Re: pei sacri Numi! .. Gloria all'Egitto" / O King, by the sacred gods ... Glory to Egypt!). At Ramfis' suggestion to the King, Aida and Amonasro remain as hostages to ensure that the Ethiopians do not avenge their defeat.

=== Act 3 ===
"O patria mia"
Sung by Marie Rappold, 1916

On the banks of the Nile, near the Temple of Isis

Prayers are said (Chorus, High Priestess, Ramfis, Amneris: "O tu che sei d'Osiride" / O thou who to Osiris art) on the eve of Amneris and Radamès' wedding in the Temple of Isis. Outside, Aida waits to meet with Radamès as they had planned (Aida: "Qui Radamès verra .. O patria mia" / Oh, my dear country!).

Amonasro appears and orders Aida to find out the location of the Egyptian army from Radamès. Aida, torn between her love for Radamès and her loyalty to her native land and to her father, reluctantly agrees. (Aida, Amonasro: "Ciel, mio padre! .. Rivedrai le foreste imbalsamate" / Once again shalt thou gaze). When Radamès arrives, Amonasro hides behind a rock and listens to their conversation.

Radamès affirms that he will marry Aida ("Pur ti riveggo, mia dolce Aida .. Nel fiero anelito"; "Fuggiam gli ardori inospiti .. Là, tra foreste vergini" / I see you again, my sweet Aida!), and Aida convinces him to flee to the desert with her.

To facilitate their escape, Radamès suggests using a secure route free from the risk of discovery and discloses the location his army plans to attack. Upon hearing this, Amonasro emerges from hiding and reveals his true identity. Radamès, horrified, realises he has inadvertently divulged a critical military secret to the enemy. Meanwhile, Amneris and Ramfis leave the temple, spot Radamès in conference with the enemy, and summon the imperial guards. Amonasro, armed with a dagger, intends to kill Amneris and Ramfis before they can alert the guards, but Radamès disarms him. He swiftly instructs Amonasro to flee with Aida and surrenders himself to the guards, who arrest him as a traitor.

=== Act 4 ===
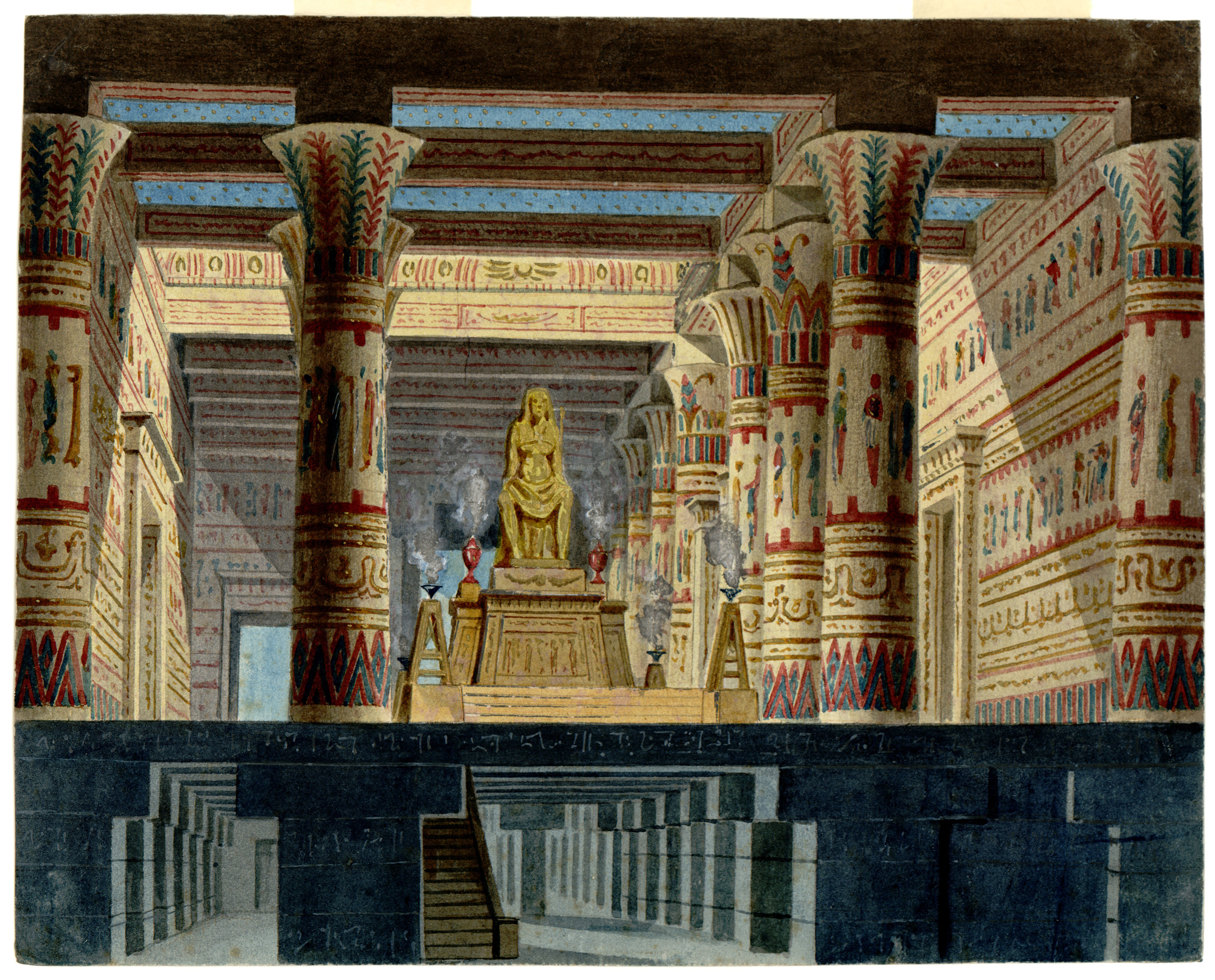
Set design for act 4 scene 2 (1872)

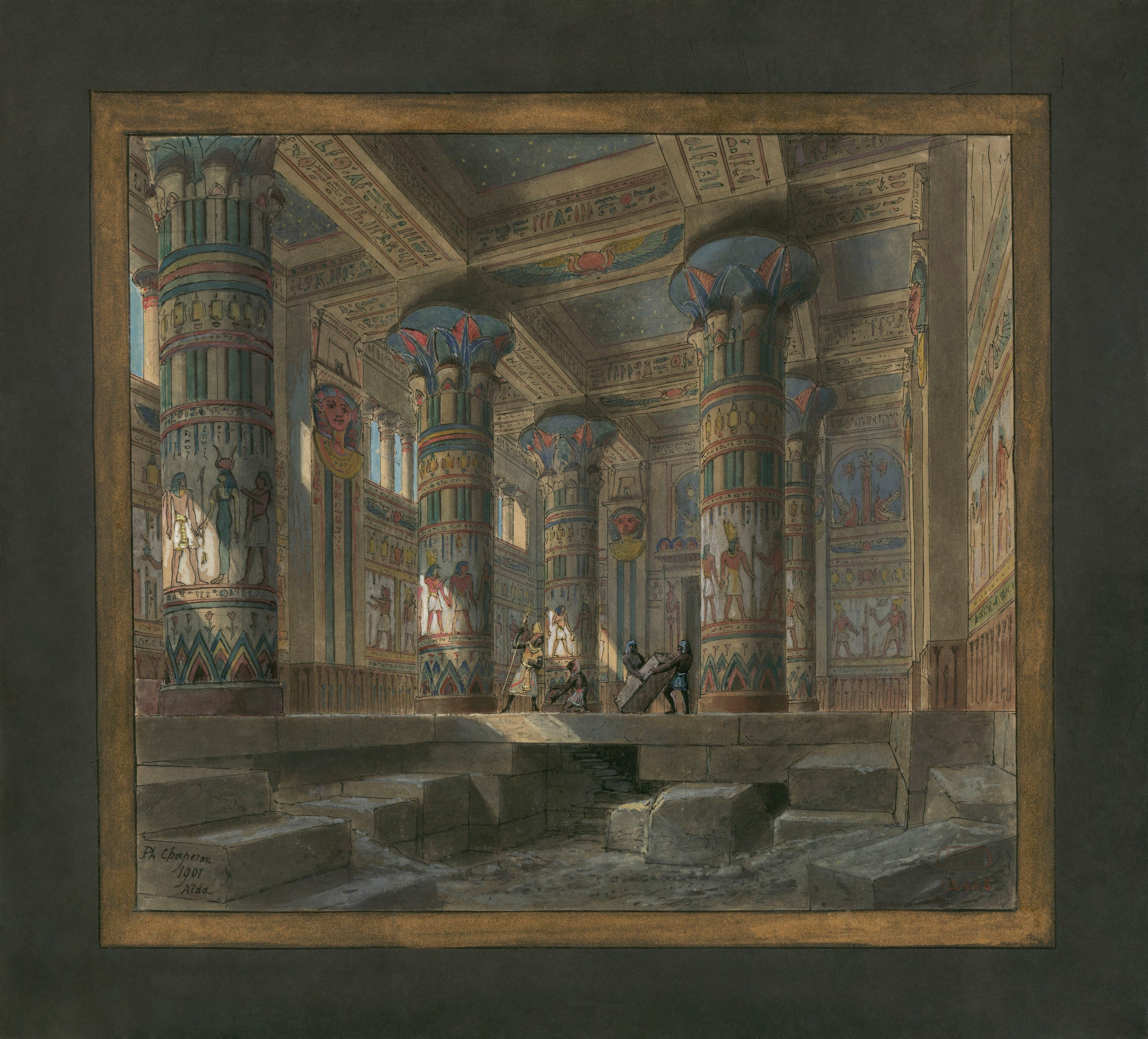
Philippe Chaperon's act 4, scene 2 set design for the 1880 Palais Garnier performance in Paris

Scene 1: A hall in the Temple of Justice. To one side is the door leading to Radamès' prison cell

Amneris wishes to save Radamès ("L'aborrita rivale a me sfuggia" / My hated rival has escaped me). She calls for the guard to bring him to her.

She asks Radamès to deny the accusations, but Radamès, who does not wish to live without Aida, refuses. He is relieved to know Aida is still alive and hopes she has reached her own country (Amneris, Radamès: "Già i Sacerdoti adunansi" / Already the priests are assembling).

Offstage, Ramfis recites the charges against Radamès and calls on him to defend himself, but he stands mute, and is condemned to death as a traitor. Amneris, who remains onstage, protests that Radamès is innocent, and pleads with the priests to show mercy. The priests sentence him to be buried alive; Amneris weeps and curses the priests as he is taken away (Judgment scene, Amneris, Ramfis, and chorus: "Ahimè! .. morir mi sento .. Radamès, è deciso il tuo fato" / Alas .. I feel death .. Radamès, your fate is decided).

"La fatal pietra"
Opening and close of act 4, scene 2, "La fatal pietra" and "Morir! Sì pura e bella", with some cuts in the middle, sung by Nicola Zerola in 1909

Scene 2: The lower portion of the stage shows the vault in the Temple of Ptah; the upper portion represents the temple itself

Radamès has been taken into the lower floor of the temple and sealed up in a dark vault, where he thinks that he is alone. As he hopes that Aida is in a safer place, he hears a sigh and then sees Aida. She has hidden herself in the vault in order to die with Radamès (Radamès: "La fatal pietra sovra me si chiuse" / The fatal stone now closes over me). They accept their terrible fate (Radamès: "Morir! Sì pura e bella" / To die! So pure and lovely!) and bid farewell to Earth and its sorrows (duet "Invan! Tutto è finito ... O terra addio" / Futile! All is finished ... O earth adieu). Above the vault in the temple of Ptah, Amneris weeps and prays to the goddess Isis. In the vault below, Aida dies in Radamès' arms as the priests, offstage, pray to the god Ptah. (Chorus, Aida, Radamès, Amneris: "Immenso Ftha" / Almighty Ptah).

== Adaptations ==
The 1942 Egyptian music film Aydah, stars Umm Kulthum in the title role. It incorporates the opera into a contemporary Egyptian context.

The 1952 Broadway musical My Darlin' Aida, set on a plantation in Tennessee in the first year of the American Civil War, is based on the opera and uses Verdi's music.

The opera has been adapted for motion pictures on several occasions, most notably in a 1953 production which starred Lois Maxwell as Amneris and Sophia Loren as Aida, and a 1987 Swedish production. In both cases, the lead actors lip-synched to recordings by actual opera singers. In the case of the 1953 film, Ebe Stignani sang as Amneris, while Renata Tebaldi sang as Aida.

The opera's story, but not its music, was used as the basis for a 1998 musical of the same name written by Elton John and Tim Rice.

The opera has been portrayed in the 2001 Italian animated film Aida of the Trees (Aida degli alberi). The characters are seen as anthropomorphic creatures between the fictional kingdoms of Alborea and Petra as the star-crossed lovers must find a way to unify their worlds while facing off against the evil high priest Ramfis.

The 2022 version choreographed by the Royal Opera House (directed by Robert Carsen) set the opera in a modern, Soviet-style, totalitarian state.

== Sources ==
- Budden, Julian (1984). The Operas of Verdi, Volume 3: From Don Carlos to Falstaff. London: Cassell. ISBN 0-304-30740-8.
- Busch, Hans (1978). Verdi's Aida. The History of an Opera in Letters and Documents. Minneapolis: University of Minnesota Press. ISBN 978-0-8166-0798-3
- Frank, Morton H. (2002). Arturo Toscanini: The NBC Years. Portland, Oregon: Amadeus Press. ISBN 1-57467-069-7.
- Greene, David Mason (1985). Greene's Biographical Encyclopedia of Composers. Reproducing Piano Roll Fnd. ISBN 0-385-14278-1.
- Irvin, Eric (1985). Dictionary of the Australian Theatre, 1788–1914. Sydney: Hale & Iremonger. ISBN 0-86806-127-1.
- Kimbell, David (2001). Holden, Amanda (ed.). The New Penguin Opera Guide. New York: Penguin Putnam. ISBN 0-14-029312-4.
- Loewenberg, Alfred (1978). Annals of Opera 1597–1940 (3rd, revised ed.). Totowa, New Jersey: Rowman and Littlefield. ISBN 978-0-87471-851-5.
- Phillips-Matz, Mary Jane (1993). Verdi: A Biography. London & New York: Oxford University Press. ISBN 0-19-313204-4.
- Pitt, Charles; Hassan, Tarek H. A. (1992). "Cairo". In Sadie, Stanley (ed.). The New Grove Dictionary of Opera. Vol. 1. London: Macmillan.
- Sadie, Stanley; Macy, Laura, eds. (2006). The Grove Book of Operas (2nd ed.). New York: Oxford University Press. ISBN 978-0-19-538711-7.
- Tarozzi, Giuseppe (1977). Non muore la musica – La vita e l'opera di Arturo Toscanini (in Italian). Sugarco Edizioni.
- Toscanini, Arturo (2002). Harvey Sachs (ed.). The Letters of Arturo Toscanini. Knopf. ISBN 9780375404054.
- Weisgall, Deborah (14 November 1999). "Looking at Ancient Egypt, Seeing Modern America". The New York Times.
- Wolff, Stéphane (1962). L'Opéra au Palais Garnier (1875–1962). Paris: L'Entr'acte. OCLC 460748195.
