= Port Said Cultural Entertainment Center =

Opera house in Port Said, Egypt

Coordinates: 31.27034772774735°N 32.304781853703815°E

- Interactive map of Port Said Cultural Entertainment Center
- Full name: Port Said Opera House
- Location: Port Said, Egypt
- Owner: National Cultural Center
- Type: Opera house, Theatre, Cultural center

Construction
- Opened: December 2016

The Port Said Cultural Entertainment Center, also known as the Port Said Opera House, is an opera house, theatre, and cinema in Port Said, Egypt. It opened in December 2016 and was inaugurated by Egyptian president Abdel Fattah el-Sisi. The main theatre, named for the Egyptian actor Mahmoud Yassin, has a capacity of 1,200 people. It also contains two movie theatres, meeting and conference rooms, a cafeteria, and a library.

Ground was broken on the four-story complex in 2006. The building's construction was a part of an initiative by the Ministry of Culture to bring cultural centers and buildings of the arts to Egyptian cities.
