= List of Copts =

This list of Copts includes notable Copts figures who are notable in their areas of expertise. For saints, please refer to List of Coptic saints.

== Performing arts ==
- Ash Atalla, British television producer
- Henry Barakat, director
- Khairy Beshara, director
- Youssef Dawoud, actor
- Nabila Erian, Opera singer
- Sanaa Gamil, actress
- Maged El Kedwany, actor
- Asaad Kelada, Hollywood director
- Rami Malek, actor
- Mena Massoud, actor
- Sandra Nashaat, director
- Yousry Nasrallah, director
- Hany Ramzy, actor
- Daoud Abdel Sayed, film director
- Hala Sedki, actress
- George Sidhom, actor

== Businessmen ==
- Nader Anise, founder of Coptic American Chamber of Commerce (Coptic Chamber) and attorney
- Tharwat Bassily
- Michael Ebeid
- Monir Fakhri Abdel Nour, banker and businessman
- Fayez Sarofim, billionaire, Houston financier
- Naguib Sawiris, one of the wealthiest 100 people worldwide
- Nassef Sawiris, Orascom Construction & Industrial. The richest man in Egypt
- Onsi Sawiris, founder of Orascom Group, Patrick of Sawiris Family
- Samih Sawiris, Orascom Tourism
- Farid Stino
- Ayad B. Saad, Businessman and Morgan Stanley Senior Vice President.

== Clergy and theologians ==
- Bishop Angaelos
- Anthony the Great, founder and pioneer of Christian monasticism
- Athanasius the Apostolic, 20th Pope of Alexandria
- Metropolitan Athanasius of Beni Suef
- Father Bishoy Kamel
- Cyril I, 24th Pope of Alexandria
- Pope Cyril VI, 116th Pope of Alexandria
- Dioscorus the Great, 25th Pope of Alexandria
- George Habib Bebawi, Patrologist and Biblical scholar
- Mother Irini
- Father Makary Younan
- Father Matta El Meskeen
- Metropolitan Mikhail of Asyut
- Bishop Missael
- Origen, Christian scholar
- Bishop Serapion
- Pope Shenouda III of Alexandria, 117th Pope of Alexandria
- Pope Tawadros II

== Lawyers and judges ==
- Sami Farag
- Sherrie Mikhail Miday

== Social activists ==
- Ester Fanous
- Akram Habib
- Alber Saber

== Engineers ==
- Hani Azer
- Michel Bakhoum
- William Selim Hanna
- Adel Sedra
- Nabih Youssef

== Scientists ==
- Azer Bestavros
- Reda R. Mankbadi
- Rushdi Said

== Architects ==
- Michel Bakhoum
- Ramses Wissa Wassef

== Historians and coptologists ==
- Aziz Suryal Atiya
- Iris Habib Elmasry
- Gawdat Gabra
- Habib Girgis
- Labib Habachi
- Severus Ibn al-Muqaffa
- Pahor Labib
- Younan Labib Rizk
- Marcus Simaika
- Father Menassa Youhanna

== Journalists and writers ==
- Anouar Abdel-Malek
- Louis Awad
- Kamal el-Mallakh
- Alfred Farag
- Mofeed Fawzy
- Waguih Ghali
- Adel Iskandar
- Magdi Khalil
- Raouf Salama Moussa
- Salama Moussa
- Ra'ouf Mus'ad
- Younan Labib Rizk
- Matthew Shenoda
- Youssef Sidhom
- Said Sonbol
- Magdi Wahba

== Musicians ==
- Wagih Aziz
- Mikhail Girgis El Batanouny
- Halim El-Dabh
- Aziz El-Shawan
- Youssef Elsisi
- Nabila Erian
- Yusef Greiss
- Adel Kamel
- Ragheb Moftah
- Osama Mounir
- Lara Scandar
- Joseph Tawadros
- Ramzi Yassa

== Painters and artists ==
- Kamal Amin
- Hany Armanious
- Evelyn Ashamallah
- George Bahgoury
- Chafik Charobim
- Isaac Fanous
- Adam Henein
- Kiko
- Margaret Nakhla
- Adel Nassief

== Politicians ==
- Jirjis al-Jawhari
- Stephan Bassily
- Boutros Boutros Ghali
- Makram Ebeid
- Ibrahim El-Gohary
- Mounir Fakhri Abdel Nour
- Akhnoukh Fanous
- Ester Fanous
- Boutros Ghali
- Youssef Boutros Ghali
- Rafik Habib
- George Helmy
- Wassef Hinein
- George Isaac
- Georgette Kellini
- Peter Khalil
- Raja Nicola
- Dina Powell
- Hala Shukrallah
- Kamel Sidky
- Kamal Stino
- Moheb Stino
- Mourad Wahba
- Youssef Wahba

== Physicians ==
- Moawad GadElrab
- Paul Ghalioungui
- Nagy Habib
- Magdy Ishak
- Naguib Pasha Mahfouz
- Marty Makary
- Hilana Sedarous
- Gorgi Sobhi
- Sir Magdi Yacoub

== Athletes ==
- Nagui Asaad
- Hisham Greiss
- Mark Kheirallah
- Youssef Makkar
- Hany Ramzy, football player (Egypt national football team)
- Mark Seif (Poker)
- Farid Simaika
- Sam Soliman
- Ashraf Youssef

== Chefs ==
- Karine Bakhoum
- Christopher Maher
- Michael Mina

== Others ==
- Lara Debbane, Miss Egypt 2014
- Thutmose Kamel Gabrial, Egyptian military pilot
- Meriam George, Miss Egypt 2005
- Nick Kaldas, retired Deputy Commissioner
- Fathia Nkrumah, wife of Kwame Nkrumah, Ghana's first president, born Fathia Rizk
- Charlotte Wassef, Miss Egypt 1934 and Miss Universe 1935

== See also ==
- Coptic diaspora
- List of Coptic saints
- Coptic Orthodox Church
- Pope of the Coptic Orthodox Church
- List of Coptic Orthodox popes
- Coptic language
- Coptic people
- Christianity in Egypt
- Copts in Sudan
- Copts in Libya
