= Fanous (surname) =

Fanous is a surname. Notable people with the surname include:

- Akhnoukh Fanous (1856–1946), Egyptian politician
- Ester Fanous (1895–1990), Egyptian feminist
- Isaac Fanous (1919–2007), Egyptian artist and scholar
- Lawrence Fanous (born 1985), Jordanian triathlete
- Wagih Fanous (born 1948), Lebanese critic, academic, and researcher
