= Mikhail Girgis El Batanouny =

Expert in Coptic music (1875–1957)

Mikhail Girgis El Batanouny (Coptic: ⲙⲓⲭⲁⲏⲗ ⲅⲉⲱⲣⲅⲓⲟⲥ ⲫⲣⲉⲙⲡⲁⲑⲁⲛⲟⲛ Mikhail Georgios Phrembatanon; also titled Mu'allim, which is Arabic for "teacher"; 14 September 1873 – 18 April 1957) was an Egyptian expert in Coptic music, and knowledgeable in church rites, in addition to being skilled in the languages of Coptic and Arabic.

He was also the distinguished leader of cantors in the Great Cathedral, and was appointed to be the first instructor of hymns in the Coptic Orthodox Clerical College by Archdeacon Habib Girgis. When the Institute of Coptic Studies was established, Cantor Mikhail was appointed to be its first teacher of hymns. The hymns from Cantor Mikhail were the source of the vocal notes recorded by Ernest Newlandsmith, a musician and composer from England, with the help of Ragheb Moftah. In addition, Cantor Mikhail conducted the first audio recording of Coptic music. In light of this great achievement, Moftah commented, "He was the only way of passing down Coptic hymns in its original form to us." And for all of these reasons, and many others, Cantor Mikhail el-Batanouni is considered to be the master of Coptic hymnology throughout Egypt. Hence, he is frequently referred to as "Cantor Mikhail the Great".

At the end of his journey, on 18 April 1957, Cantor Mikhail the Great departed, at the age of 83, after serving the Coptic Orthodox Church for approximately 70 years. His musical studies were preserved by Moftah in the United States Library of Congress, and cantors still chant them in their churches to this day.

== See also ==
- Institute of Coptic Studies
- Coptic Orthodox Church
- List of Copts
