= Ragheb Moftah =

Egyptian musicologist

- Born: 21 December 1898; Al-Faggala Cairo, Egypt
- Died: 16 June 2001 (aged 102); Cairo, Egypt
- Occupations: Dean of the Department of Music and Hymns at the Institute of Coptic Studies
- Writing career
- Notable works: The Preserver of the hymns and rites of the Coptic Orthodox Church

Ragheb Moftah (1898–2001) was an Egyptian musicologist and scholar of the Coptic music heritage. He co-authored the article on "Coptic Music" for the Coptic Encyclopedia. He spent much of his life studying the recording and notation of Coptic liturgical texts. The son of Habashi Moftah and Labiba Shalaby, Moftah was one of nine children.

== Education ==
He studied in Germany at the Faculty of Agriculture of the University of Bonn in the Rhineland and obtained a B.Sc. in agriculture. His great passion was music. He obtained degrees in Music from the University of Bonn and in Catholic Southern Germany at the Ludwig-Maximilians-Universität München. He made a studio at St. Mary Coptic Orthodox Church Kasriet El-Rihan in Old Cairo. In 1927, he invited Prof. Ernest Newlandsmith from London, who transcribed all the Coptic Heritage 1928-1936.

== Institute of Coptic Studies ==
In 1955, he was responsible for the Music & Hymn Department at the Institute of Coptic Studies and moved the primary studio he had already made in St. Mary Church. He began recording the hymns and all the Church services with Mlm. Mikhail's voice and then published in more talented voices on cassette tapes, for a total of 54 tapes.

== St. Basil's mass ==
In 1970, he invited the scientist Margit Toth to collaborate in producing a transcription of St. Basil's Mass, building on a partial edition by Professor Ernest Newlandsmith, who had prepared responses and the first part in each priest's (solo) part. He and Margit Toth later worked closely as well with Martha Roy, an ethnomusicologist and lifelong resident of Egypt, who came from a family of American Presbyterian missionaries. With these colleagues, Moftah prepared an edition of the mass, accompanied by musical notations and with Coptic, English and Arabic text. In 1998 The American University in Cairo published this annotated edition as The Coptic Orthodox Liturgy of St. Basil.

In 1992, he offered his works to the Library of Congress in Washington, D.C. to be kept over generations using the latest technology.

== Personal life ==
In 1963, Moftah married Mary Gabriel Rizq. He is the father of Micah Moftah, Architect.

== See also ==
- List of Copts
- Coptic music
- Ernest Newlandsmith
