= Coptic music =

Liturgical music among Coptic Christians

Coptic music is the music sung and played in the Coptic Orthodox Church and the Coptic Catholic Church. It has some roots in ancient Egyptian music and many elements of ancient Egyptian music continue to survive in Coptic liturgical music, with additional Byzantine and Hebrew influences. It consists mainly of chanted hymns in rhythm with instruments such as cymbals (hand and large size) and the triangle. The percussion instruments used in the Coptic Church are unusual among Christian liturgies. Since similar instruments appear in ancient Egyptian frescoes and reliefs, some believe that they may represent a survival from a very old tradition. Coptic music is purely religious.

Coptic chant is an ancient tradition that has been linked to the musical practices of ancient Egypt. One example is a hymn called Golgotha sung on Good Friday, which may be derived from melodies used by ancient Egyptian priests during royal funerary rites.

Coptic music has been transmitted orally over thousands of years, and only recently have manuscripts, musical notes and books been used to record the Coptic music.

The most famous modern Coptic cantor is the late Cantor Mikhail Girgis El Batanouny, whose recordings have helped preserve and unify many ancient chants that otherwise would have been lost. They were recorded in Bohairic Pronunciation.

== Contemporary personalities contributing to Coptic music ==
- Mikhail Girgis El Batanouny
- Adel Kamel
- Ragheb Moftah
- Ernest Newlandsmith
- Nabila Erian
- Emmanuel Saad
- Abanob Ghobrial

== See also ==
- Music of Egypt
- Coptic Orthodox Church
- Institute of Coptic Studies
- Agpeya
