= Zuzana Skálová =

Czech art historian and icon restorer

Zuzana Skálová (born 30 March 1945 in Prague) is a Czech historian of medieval art, restorer and teacher of restoring of Coptic icons, who was settled and active from 1989 till 1996 in Egypt. She restored and taught restoring of Coptic icons in Cairo and restored Coptic icons in the Monastery of St. Catherine in Sinai, and others.

== Studies ==
- 1969–1975 History of Art and Archaeology, The University of Amsterdam, Diss. 1976
- Centro Instituto per il restauro in Rome
- Byzantin Museum in Athens, Studio of restoration (Stavros Baltoianis)
- 1983, 1985, 1987 The Soviet all nations' Institute of restoration in Moscow

== Practice ==
- 1988 – restoration of icons from collections of the Saint Catherine's Monastery on Sinai
- 1989–1996 living in Egypt, restoration of Coptic icons and teaching of restorers in Egypt; Leader of The Foundation for the Conservation of Icons in the Middle East; in collaboration with Institute of Coptic Studies in Cairo.

== Works ==
- Icons of the Nile Valley. (co-author Gawdat Gabra). Egyptian International Publishing Company – Longman, (1st edition 2003, 2nd edition 2006); ISBN 977-16-0588-7
- The 17th century Icon Mother of God Of Smolensk ‚Rediscovered‘, in: Preprints of the 8th Triennial Conference, ICOM Conservation Committee, Marina del Rey 1987, III, pp. 1127–1131.
- St. Mark the Evangelist with Severed Head: Unique Iconography in Egypt. In: Byzantinoslavica, Revue internationale des études Byzantines 56, Num. 3 (1995), pp. 721–734.
- Zuzana Skálová and Stephen Davis, A Medieval Icon with Scenes from the Life of Christ and the Virgin in the Church of Abu Seifein, Cairo : An Interdisciplinary Approach', Bulletin de la Société d'Archéologie Copte 39 (2000), p. 227
- A Holy Map to Christian Tradition: Preliminary Notes on Painted Proskynetaria of Jerusalem in the Ottoman Era. In: Rýžoviště zlata a doly drahokamů. Sborník pro Václava Huňáčka. Červený Kostelec: Pavel Mervart, 2006 pp. 99–119.
- St. John the Baptist in Dayr al-Suryan, in the Wadi Natrun: A Crusader era Deesis icon from the Byzantine periphery: Re-vivified using the "Mobile Icon Restoration Unit" 2000–2010. In: Byzantinoslavica, Revue internationale des études Byzantines 72, Num. 1–2 (2014), pp. 350–369
- Zuzana Skálová, Magdi Mansour and Youhanna Nesim Youssef: Three Medieval Beam – Icons on Coptic Patriarchal Churches in Cairo, in: Actes du Symposium de Fouilles Copte 1995. Cairo 1998.

== See also ==
- Coptic Museum
- Coptic Encyclopedia
