= Gorgi Sobhi =

Egyptian professor

Gorgi Sobhi (1884–1964) was an Egyptian Professor of General Medicine, Professor of the History of Medicine and Professor of Egyptology.

== Life ==
Sobhi was born in Mimon of Beni Suef, Egypt to a Coptic family. His mother died one week after he was born. Sobhi lived with his father, who was a manager in an arsenal factory. Dr. Harper, the British manager of Harmal Hospital in Cairo, fostered Sobhi and the family brought him up as a twin brother to their own son who was almost of the same age. Sobhi lived with the Harpers till the age of 9. Being brought up in an English family, he spoke fluent English.

Sobhi was fluent in seven languages: English, French, Italian, Arabic, Greek, Latin and Coptic. He could also read hieroglyphics. He learned Italian while looking after the Italian prisoners of war during the First World War.

== Academic career in Medicine ==
Sobhi achieved first place in the 11+ exam in Egypt. He obtained his primary school certificate from Al-Nasseriya School, then studied at Al-Tawfikiya Secondary School in Shubra, where he earned his baccalaureate degree. He was initially found to be too young to enroll in the Faculty of Medicine, but the faculty administration finally agreed to accept him. He enrolled and earned his medical diploma from Qasr El Eyni Hospital in 1904. Sobhi was appointed director of the Fever Hospital in Abbassia for one year. He was subsequently appointed as Anatomist at the Faculty of Medicine, where he worked with Professor Sir Grafton Elliot Smith, with whom he conducted research on Egyptian mummies and approximately 3,000 bodies from various historical periods. He wrote several papers in this field.

In 1909, Sobhi traveled to London on a study mission, where he met Professor Makram Ebeid, who was studying law at Oxford University. However, he returned to Cairo two years later to look after his family following the sudden death of his father. Upon his return, he was appointed assistant professor to Dr. Phillips, a professor of internal medicine, who involved him in research related to parasitic diseases and fevers. In 1940, he assumed the position of Professor and head of the Department of Internal Medicine in Qasr El Eyni, a position he held until 1952. During this time, he obtained a fellowship from the Royal College of Physicians in London (FRCP), in addition to holding a position as a private physician specializing in internal medicine.

He was particularly interested in public health in Egypt at the turn of the century. Sobhi pioneered asthma treatment treating it with gold salt injections, a breakthrough during that time. In an article published in 1904, Sobhi admonished Egyptian women for seeking treatment from a scientifically trained physician only when their life was in danger. The article presented a study of the customs and superstitions of childbirth and pregnancy in Egypt during that period. His detailed description of the traditional birthing method highlighted the importance medical reformers in Egypt put in the context of indigenous beliefs. He wrote numerous books and publications in the field of medicine and public health, including a five-volume book on medicines and their uses, which was published in 1925. He also wrote a book on dysentery, its origin and treatment. In 1949, the university published his lectures on the history of medicine in English.

Sobhi loved the history of medicine and wrote extensively on the subject. He was the first to introduce the history of medicine to the Faculty of Medicine, and the first to receive the title of "Professor of the History of Medicine and Internal Medicine" in Egypt.

== Academic career in Egyptology & Coptology ==
Sobhi was also Professor of Egyptology at the faculty of art at Fouad Ist university. The Faculty of Arts appointed him to teach the Demotic Egyptian language at the school of Egyptian Antiquities. He also taught Pharaonic and Coptic languages at the Clerical College in Cairo and at the Institute of Coptic Studies.

He learned the Coptic language almost by accident. The Mahdist War in Sudan forced the Coptic Bishop there, Bishop Macarius of Khartoum, to flee to Egypt, where he met Sobhi and taught him Coptic. Bishop Macarius encouraged Sobhi to pay attention to the language of his ancestors and adhere to it. Sobhi became a scholar in the language and so fluent in Coptic that, when he came across a rare old Coptic text on proverbs, he was able to transcribe it in one night and return it to its owner. He later published his translation of the transcript in a book.

In 1908, Sobhi assisted Marcus Simaika in establishing the Coptic Museum. He was also elected a member of the board of directors of the Coptic Antiquities Society in Cairo at its inception in 1934.

Sobhi was so renowned in the fields of Egyptology and Coptology, that Saad Zaghloul, the national Egyptian leader, commissioned him to compile a major scholarly reference on the Egyptian and Coptic language. The book was printed in Arabic and in English in 1925 by the Ministry of Public Education at the government's expense under the title "The Book of the Grammar of the Egyptian Coptic Language". The book, which was written specifically for the School of Archaeology that was inaugurated during the reign of King Fuad I, was large in size and consisted of 254 pages.

Sobhi was a prolific writer in the field of Coptology and Coptic studies. In 1915, he wrote the book "The Pronunciation of the Coptic Language in the Egyptian Church," published in the Egyptian Antiquities Society. He contributed to publishing the Book of Proverbs in Coptic, which was published by the Egyptian University in 1927. He also wrote an article entitled "The Coptic Calendar and the Coptic Calculation", which was published in the Coptic Antiquities Society's journal in 1942–1943, and an article entitled "Education in Egypt during the Christian Era, and among the Copts" that was also published in the Egyptian Antiquities Society journal in 1943. In addition, he wrote the only book of its kind entitled "Arabic colloquial words of Coptic and Greek origin", a 24-page book printed by the Coptic Antiquities Society.

On March 4, 1924, at the YMCA Club in Cairo, Sobhi gave a lecture entitled "The Relationship of the Ancient Egyptians to Modern Egypt." In this lecture, he stated that "The Egyptian living today in this land is no different from the Egyptian who lived there seven thousand years ago in appearance, customs, and morals [...] The Egyptians have preserved all the customs, morals, and other things that their ancestors possessed. There is no difference in this between Christians and Muslims, as they are one and the same." That transcript of the lecture was published in the magazine Al-Karma.

In 1935, in an article entitled "Notes on the ethnology of the Copts considered from the point of view of their descendance from the Ancient Egyptians", published in the Bulletin de l’Association des Amis des églises et de l’art Copte, Sobhi asserted that the Copts were the direct and actual representatives of the Ancient Egyptians based on ethnological, philological and anthropological criteria.

== See also ==
- List of Copts
- Lists of Egyptians
- Egyptology
- Coptology
