= J. Willard Marriott Library =

Library at the University of Utah

Coordinates: 40.7625°N 111.8461°W

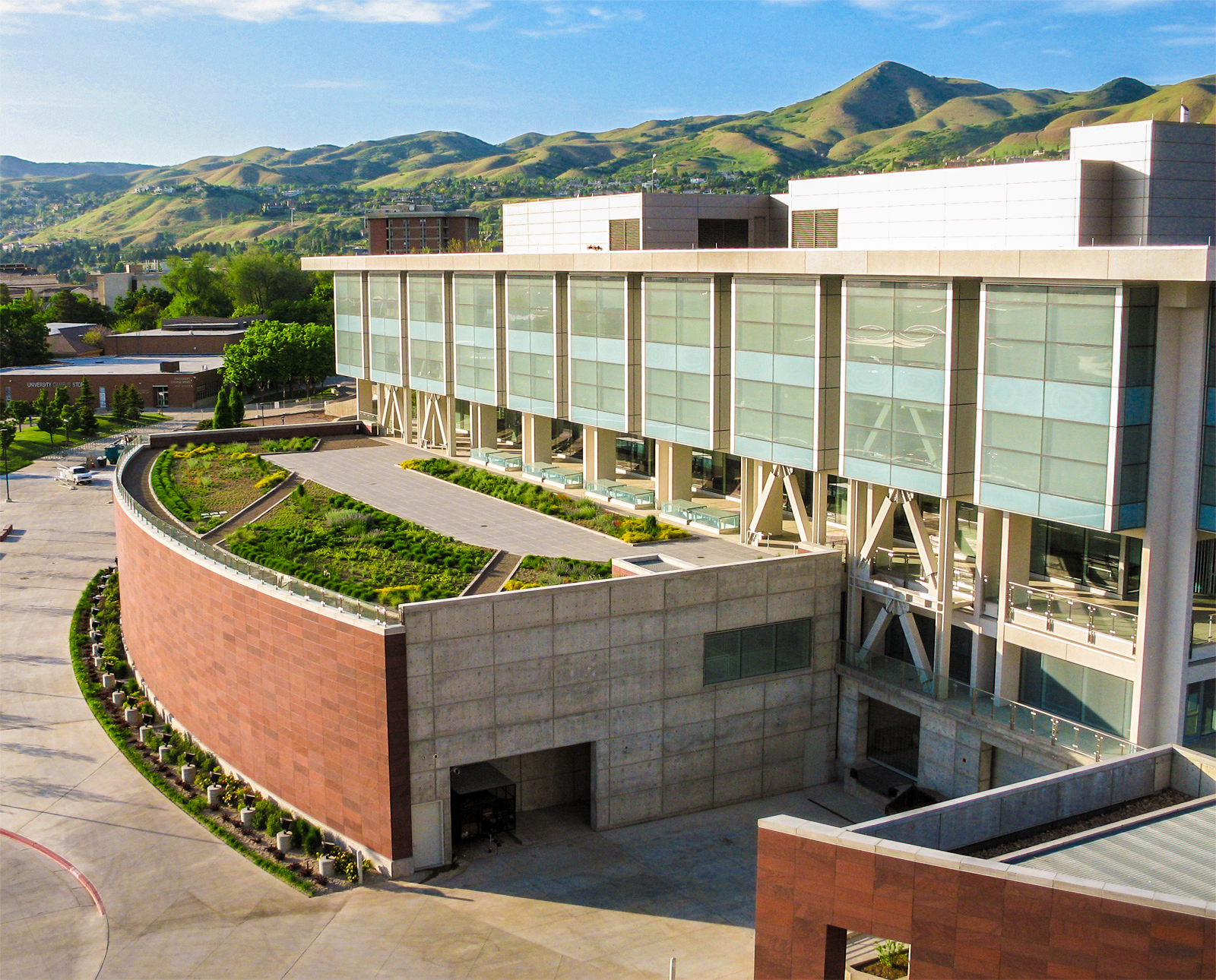
- Location: University of Utah; Salt Lake City, Utah, United States
- Type: Academic
- Established: 1968

Collection
- Size: 4.54 million volumes (2021)

Access and use
- Circulation: 35,555 (2021–2022)

Other information
- Director: Sarah Shreeves
- Employees: 252
- Website: https://lib.utah.edu/

The J. Willard Marriott Library is the main academic library of the University of Utah in Salt Lake City, Utah. The university library has had multiple homes since the first University of Utah librarian was appointed in 1850. The current building was opened in 1968 and named for J. Willard Marriott, founder of Marriott International, in 1969. After two major renovations, the building is more than 500,000 square feet (46,000 m^{2}) and houses more than 4.5 million volumes. The University of Utah Press and Red Butte Press are divisions of the Marriott Library.

== History ==
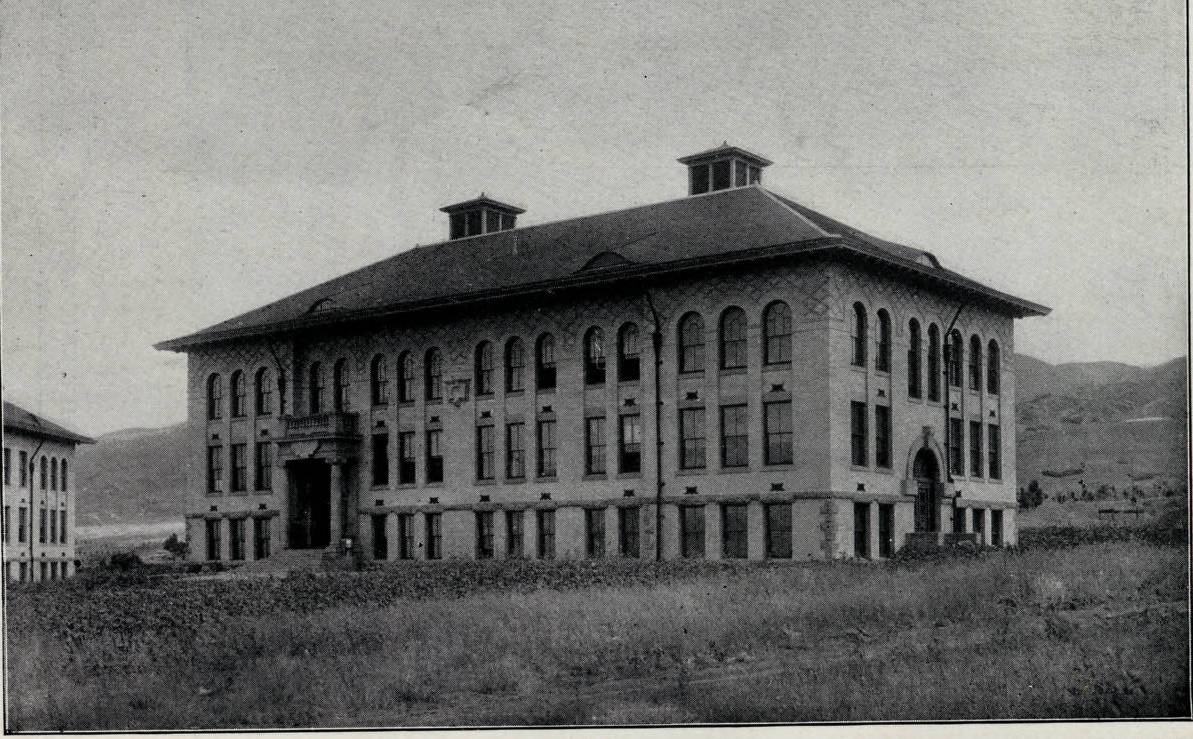
The 1900 library as it appeared in the 1905 University of Utah Yearbook

The first University of Utah librarian was appointed in 1850, the same year the school was founded. University president John R. Park opened a library and reading room stocked with his personal collection of books on loan to the university in 1874. The library moved to the LeRoy Cowles Building in 1900 and the George Thomas Library Building in 1935, both on Presidents Circle. The current five-story building was opened in 1968 and was named for J. Willard Marriott in 1969 when he contributed $1 million for library collections, the largest single contribution ever received by the university at that time.

The library was expanded 210,000 square feet (20,000 m^{2}) in 1996, which almost doubled the library's size, and was expanded again during a major renovation between 2005 and 2009. The purpose of this renovation was to improve the seismic stability of the building, provide clearer pathways through the building, improve environmental controls, and allow for more natural light. Several additions were also made to the building including an automated storage and retrieval system that can store up to 2 million items, a larger computer lab, additional classrooms and teaching labs, a new indoor café, a rooftop garden, and additional study areas including the George S. Eccles Grand Reading Room.

== Collections ==
The library's Special Collections department collects, preserves, and makes available books, periodicals, documents, photographs, films, and original materials, particularly those documenting the history of Utah, the Mormons, the West, the Middle East, and the University of Utah. These collections include the papers of Marriner Stoddard Eccles, Chairman of the Federal Reserve from 1934 to 1938; David O. McKay, ninth President of the Church of Jesus Christ of Latter-day Saints; Leonidas Ralph Mecham, Director of the Administrative Office of the United States Courts from 1985 to 2006; and Wallace Stegner, winner of the Pulitzer Prize for Fiction in 1972. Materials are accessible to all patrons, regardless of their status.

The library hosts over 100 unique digital collections, many of which include items from Special Collections. Digital collections include USpace, Utah Digital Newspapers, the Western Soundscape Archive, and the Western Waters Digital Library. The library also hosts the Mountain West Digital Library, a digital collaborative program of the Utah Academic Library Consortium. The library provides access to print on demand books via an Espresso Book Machine.

The Aziz S. Atiya Middle East Library, which is located in the Marriott Library, is named after the founder of the University of Utah Middle East Center, Aziz Suryal Atiya, and is the fifth largest library for Middle East studies in North America.

The Katherine W. Dumke Fine Arts & Architecture Library collection includes artist's books, catalogue raisonnés, graphic novels, sheet music, and other arts books and periodicals.

Artwork in the library's collection includes pieces by Anna Campbell Bliss, a Salt Lake City-based artist.

== Services ==
Book Arts Studio, seeks to combine traditional bookmaking techniques with modern aestethics and technology, and "champions wide-ranging explorations of the book." The Book Arts Studio's allows patrons to utilize letterpress, type, photo engravings, and bookbinding equipment and also promotes various community outreach programs and events.

Family Reading Room is reserved for the University of Utah's students, staff and faculty, to bring children they may have under 12 and allow those patrons to get work done while their children present. The room provides desktop computers, a printer, family study rooms, as well as a lactation room that can hold up to four people. Children must be present in order for a parent and/or guardian to utilize the room, and are responsible for the safety and behavior of their child.

Knowledge Commons, located on the second floor of the Marriott Library, and acts as the main service desk for research and technology assistance. The Knowledge Commons provides: printing, scanning, and software support, devices and/or equipment available to be checked out, mobile phone and laptop configuration, and classroom support.

Protospace provides staff and faculty of the University of Utah with access to a wide variety of prototyping tools, digital media technology, staff assistance, and resources. It is located on level 1, suite 1705 of the Marriott Library and offers weekly lectures and events, as well as creation/fabrication activities such as: 3d printing scanning, podcast & video production, vinyl cutter, virtual reality, sewing machines, and more.

Room and Spaces allows students to find and schedule study spaces, and to find information on rooms and services available in the library.

Writing Center, allows students to make appointments for one-on-one tutoring for those that wish to become a more confident writer. The goal of the Writing Center is to: "empower students to express themselves clearly and confidently, transforming ideas into impactful writing across all disciplines." The tutors help to develop ideas, improve writing, discuss the dangers of plagiarism, assist with papers, theses, articles, and other various writing tasks.
