= Otto Friedrich August Meinardus =

German Coptologist and pastor (1925-2005)

- Born: September 29, 1925; Hamburg, Germany
- Died: September 18, 2005 (aged 79); Ellerau, Germany

Academic background
- Education: Harvard University

Academic work
- Sub-discipline: Coptology
- Institutions: American University in Cairo; University of Hamburg

Otto Friedrich August Meinardus (September 25, 1925 – September 18, 2005) was a German Coptologist, professor, and pastor who wrote numerous books and articles about Coptic Christianity in Egypt.

== Early life ==
Meinardus was born in Hamburg in 1925, where he received his secondary schooling. He studied theology and sociology in Hamburg, London, St Louis, Chicago, and at Harvard University, Boston, where he obtained his PhD. Dr.

== Career ==
Meinardus was a professor at the American University in Cairo (AUC) from 1956 till 1968, and pastor of the Maadi Community Church (MCC) in Cairo, Egypt.

Meinardus befriended the Coptic monk Father Antonius, who later on became Pope Shenouda III (1971-2012), the head of the Coptic Orthodox Church. Dr. Meinardus became an active member of several research institutions for Coptic studies in Cairo.

== Expulsion from Egypt ==
Meinardus, together with other non-Egyptian faculty at the American University in Cairo, was expelled from Egypt shortly before the Six-Day War of 1967. He served as pastor in several other countries and returned to Germany in 1975 where he became pastor and later professor in Middle Eastern Religions at the University of Hamburg.

== Publications ==
Dr. Meinardus was a prolific writer; his books and articles became a main source of reference on the Coptic Orthodox Church. From 2000 to 2005, Dr. Meinardus served on the board of advisers of Arab-West Report, an Egyptian electronic magazine.

Dr. Meinardus was the author of the first book published by the AUC Press, "Monks and Monasteries of the Egyptian Deserts,” in 1961. A revised edition of the book was still in print 45 years later.

He was also the author of the following AUC Press books:

- "Christian Egypt Ancient and Modern,” (1965)
- "Christian Egypt Faith and Life,” (1970)
- "The Holy Family in Egypt,” (1986, a reprint of a book he wrote around 1960)
- "Die Heilige Familie in Agypten,” (1988)
- "Monks and Monasteries of the Egyptian deserts,” Revised Edition (1988)
- "Two Thousand Years of Coptic Christianity,” (2000)
- "Coptic Saints and Pilgrimages,' (2002)

He also wrote a chapter in “Christian Egypt: Coptic Art through Two Millennia,” edited by Massimo Capuani (2002).

His books published by Lycabettus Press of Greece are:

- "St. Paul in Greece,” (1973)
- "St. John of Patmos and the Seven Churches of the Apocalypse,” (1974)
- "St. Paul in Ephesus and the Cities of Galatia and Cyprus,” (1973)

He published articles in Kemet – Das schwarze Land; Ägypten. Eine Zeitschrift für Ägyptenfreunde (Kemet), Coptic Church Review, Coptologist and other theological and literary publications.

His last book “Christians in Egypt: Orthodox, Catholic, and Protestant Communities Past and Present,” was published posthumously in 2006.

== Style ==
Otto Meinardus had his own style of studying the church. He not only looked into relevant manuscripts in Western libraries, but also met with Desert Fathers, grasped their spirituality, and documented mostly oral traditions in an academic style.

In his books for the American University in Cairo Press, Meinardus was careful not to offend his Coptic readers. However, in Kemet, he was more open and questioned certain Coptic traditions and beliefs.

== Recognition ==
He is generally recognized as the most important contemporary Western authority on the Church in Egypt.

One year prior to his death the Otto Meinardus Stiftung (foundation) was established with the purpose of preserving his intellectual heritage. A list of articles published in Kemet can be found on the web site of the Otto Meinardus Stiftung.

== Death ==
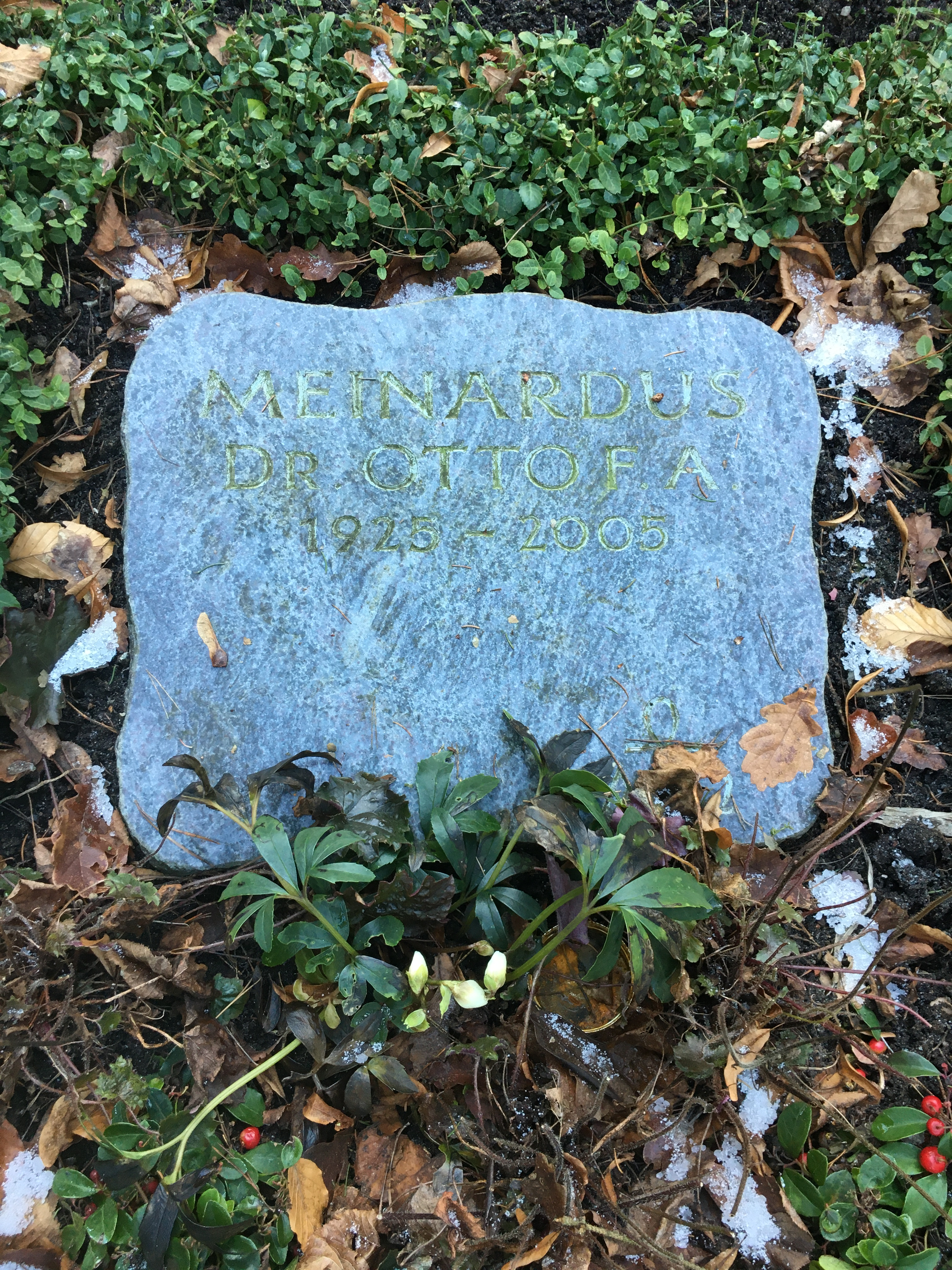
Gravestone

Meinardus died in September 2005 in Ellerau, Germany.
