= Coptic Orthodox Healing Among Egyptians =

This article is about Coptic Orthodox healing among Egyptians.

Observant Coptic Orthodox Christians (Copts) practice and accept the “Seven Sacraments,”. These are explain as channels in which believers receive the sanctifications of the Holy Spirit. The Seven Sacraments are: baptism, confirmation, repentance and confession, communion, matrimony, anointing of the sick, and priesthood.

The sixth Sacrament, ‘anointing of the sick’, is the basis of Coptic Orthodox healing.

== Background ==
The Coptic Church in Egypt is not only a spiritual temple but also a central foundation for all resources. Amongst these resources, Jill Kamil explains in her book; Coptic Egypt: History and Guide, that there are over 150 Coptic organizations in Cairo alone, institutions including but not limited to: schools, orphanages, retirement homes, hospitals and social service centers, all run on Church grounds. With these exterior sources, Copts (along with Muslims) are permitted the opportunity to go to school and most importantly be a healthy enabled person.

However, instead of thanking the Church for these services, Copts are more inclined to thank the grace of God for His work within the Church. Kamil further explains that for Egyptians a sense of the supernatural was, and remains, strong. Copts believe in miracles: miracles like visitations of Saint Mary or healing of the sick or the efficacy of the Seven Sacraments. With the belief in miracles, Egyptians believe that their most unfortunate circumstance could be solved by God, as well as the patron of Saints that could intercede on the supplicant's behalf. In between the miracles and heavenly mysteries, Copts have an interesting perception on sickness and its execution as well as spiritual remedies.

== The role of the Spiritual Fathers ==
The performance of a sacrament is considered a mystery because while it is believed that God performs it, He does it through the action of a Priest. The sacrament of Priesthood is considered to be an important and crucial duty. When elected, it is believed that the Father receives the Holy Spirit after an intense period of fasting, prayers and education. After ordination, the Priest is sent to a needed congregation and is given the authority to officiate the Sacraments of the Church. Kamil explains that Copts depend on Priests to pray over certain situations in their lives.

Situations vary but the frequent calling for priests are usually due to sickness or disease of a member.

== Healing of the sick ==
Healing of the sick, which is also referred to as the “Unction”, is one of the divine mysteries belonging to the Orthodox belief, where the sick who are faithful become healed from psychological and/or physical illnesses. Carl S. Tyneh writes in Orthodox Christianity: Overview and Bibliography, that there are visible and invisible elements to thus sacrament.

The visible elements are the oil, the prayer of the Church, the congregation and the actual performance of the anointing. The invisible element is that where the Holy Spirit works to cure the sick. Tyneh explains however, that only if God permits will, will the sick be granted healing. The Orthodox Confession of Peter Mogila clarifies this point by noting; “it is not always good that the healing of the body should occur; nonetheless, the forgiveness of the soul’s sins always takes place with him who repents.”

Although some branches of Christianity only perform this unction to those who are fatally ill, Orthodoxy celebrates this mystery at any time even for minor illnesses. This sacrament is optional and not mandatory. Tyneh clarifies that participation are for those who desire and feel the need. However, it is strongly urged that the anointing of the sick is performed for the dying so that their soul be strengthened during their final struggle against death. The importance of this sacrament was stated by Saint James when he wrote in the Bible; “Is any sick among you? Let him call for the elders of the church; and let them pray over him, anointing him with oil in the name of the Lord: and the prayer of faith shall save the sick…”

With specific orders, this sacrament is commonly referred to as the sacrament of Kendeel, in Arabic that literally translates to the ‘Sacrament of Lamps’. This name was adopted because the early Christians used to place oil in a lamp, from which hung seven other lamps. Each lamp was then lit and followed with a specific prayer. This ritual still exists, however, the seven lamps are now replaced by seven wicks made out of cotton wool and sits in a plate of oil. It is then believed that the Holy Spirit sanctifies the oil in order to heal those anointed by it. However, before this sacrament could take place Bishop Mettaous explains that the sick must partake in confessions. After a private confession, both the priest and their family members are gathered to attend the Sacrament of Unction to witness the diseased be anointed and prayed on. A full recovery is not usually expected immediately after service, the patient has to continue being devout and believe in God's miracles.

In the Orthodox Church, this sacrament can be administered to any baptized person; the Church does not have a special unction for larger cases. It's important to note that throughout the Orthodox history, monasteries were among the first hospitals in Egypt and monks tended to treat the sick by providing the appropriate medication, as well as administering the Sacrament by praying for the diseased. This demonstrates that Orthodoxy does not condone Western medicine but suggests the balance of both human and spiritual healing. For example, St. Pachomious in his Koinonia II, 40, wrote: "If some sickness is alleged, the housemaster shall proceed to the minister of the sick and receive from them whatever medicine is necessary." A- Malek explains that although the Church does not discourage any believer from seeking proper medical attention, it is important to have God in their hearts as their only true Provider and Healer. In other words, medical alternatives are considered as tools but God is the one who fills and completes the medicine ministered by human.

== The Motivation ==
Daniel B. Clendenin affirms in his book, Eastern Orthodox Theology: A Contemporary Reader, that this Unction is not limited to the number of times one receives it; he goes in so far to say, “It should be used as medicine, whenever there is need.”

There are many explanations and reasons as to why Copts seek spiritual healing instead or in addition to medical practices. A-Malek explains that while the sixth sacrament is certainly practiced and healing may come from it, it should not replace the practices of Western medicine. It is argued that Copts seek spiritual healing from the Church for three main motives: First, as previously explained above, Egyptian Christians are devout, religious people and truly believe in God's grace and miracles. Second, Egyptians are very traditional people and do not appreciate Western influence so many resort to using spiritual folk remedies. And finally, many Coptic Egyptians live in remote areas where doctors are inconvenient and are not affordable.

From the beginning of time, Egyptian medicine contained a strong element of religious magic. From ancient civilization, Egypt acquired the first physician, Imhotep, as well as the first medical textbook Ebers Papyrus. While offering prayers and sacrifices to religious deities, they also took preventive measures such as storing grain against future need. Researchers have also founded a school offering education to Egyptian physicians that dated as early as 1100 b.c. Here, a number of practical therapeutic remedies of care for the sick were developed and still exercised.

Since medicine has a long history in Egypt, Egyptians feel that there is no specific need to Western medicine. With this in mind, Egyptians still partake in traditional remedies and believe that religious powers are beyond the most influential. Other than tradition, most Egyptians view public health as a burden. The Oxford Business Group provides essential information in The Report: Egypt 2010, and further identifies the overburden of the health system in Egypt. For example, making an appointment at a public clinic requires the patients to fill out a substantial amount of paperwork. This is problematic for two main reasons: First lower-class citizens may be illiterate and not able to fill forms and most importantly, many Egyptians don't have sufficient documentation or money to see a physician.

Another key information that is presented is that the public health facilities are centered in urban areas – around two-thirds of facilities are located in Cairo and Alexandria. Of course, this benefits the wealthy patients since it is readily available to them and some may even receive private care more regularly than the less affluent. “The population is very price-sensitive,” said Hazen Adlan, the medical director of Dar El Mona Hospital, “oftentimes if they can't afford care, they just don’t go to the doctor’s office,” he added.

These conditions along with many others push and motivate most Copts to rely on the Church for its consistent therapeutical and medical support. However, the most significant factor of Church reliance is the passing of folklores. Since there have been many stories of healings, Egyptians pass certain traditions and stories among their friends and families.

In recent times, a well-known Priest named Father Makary Younan (1934-2022) performed many spiritual healings at his primary church, Saint Mark's Coptic Orthodox Cathedral in Azbakeya, Cairo. Although he was widely recognized for his exorcisms, Father Makary had also provided instant healing among Christians and Muslims alike. His meetings started with a small crowd, and by word of mouth and many success stories later, the Church was surrounded by thousands people looking for support. Fr. Makary held a general meeting every Friday, consisting of hymns, a general sermon, question-and-answer session, and general prayer whereby exorcisms would take place. Countless individuals would fill the cathedral each week and many more watched the televised meeting worldwide, as he performed the Sacrament of healing to hundreds of people visiting from neighboring Egyptian municipalities and internationally.
