= Mountain West Digital Library =

Library consortium

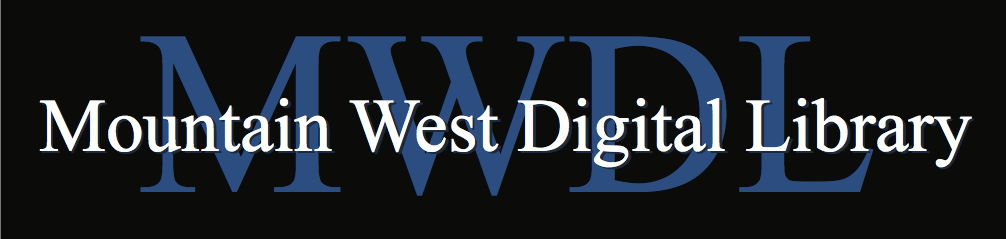
- Location: Salt Lake City, Utah, United States
- Type: Digital library
- Established: 2001

Other information
- Director: Teresa Hebron
- Employees: 4
- Website: http://mwdl.org

The Mountain West Digital Library (MWDL) is a centralized discovery portal for digital resources from libraries, archives, museums, government agencies, and historical societies in the Mountain West region of the United States. MWDL aggregates metadata from these memory institutions and provides online access to their cultural heritage and scholarly resources at http://mwdl.org. The MWDL provides services to a widespread digital library community and serves as the regional service hub to the Digital Public Library of America for Utah, Nevada, Idaho, Arizona, Montana, and Hawaii.

== History ==
The Mountain West Digital Library was formed in 2001 as a program of the Utah Academic Library Consortium (UALC). Members of UALC created the Mountain West Digital Library to provide one-stop searching for users to access the digital collections of UALC institutions, including the University of Utah, Brigham Young University, Utah State University, Southern Utah University, and others. The MWDL has grown from its original Utah roots to offer services to memory institutions in Nevada, Arizona, Idaho, Montana, and Hawaii as well. (Hawaii is included because of Brigham Young University-Hawaii’s affiliation with the Provo, Utah-based Brigham Young University.)

Founding goals also include developing standards and best practices for interoperability, sharing professional expertise and equipment, and assisting new partners beginning to digitize their archives and special collections. By leveraging the distributed MWDL network of hosting hubs and digitization centers, smaller memory institutions are able to work with larger ones to upload digital resources online, increasing the visibility of their collections and reducing wear and tear on fragile items.

In 2013, the Mountain West Digital Library was selected as one of the six inaugural service hubs of the Digital Public Library of America, the national digital library of the United States. MWDL participates in the DPLA's Digital Hubs Pilot Project (2012-2015) and the Public Library Partnerships Project (2013-2015).

== Organizational structure ==
The Mountain West Digital Library is a program of the Utah Academic Library Consortium and is governed by the UALC Council of Directors. Funding for the program is provided by the Utah Academic Library Consortium, the Digital Public Library of America, and member organizations.

The MWDL program and staff are hosted at the J. Willard Marriott Library at the University of Utah in Salt Lake City, Utah, which provides in-kind support such as office space, equipment, meeting space, financial management services, human resources services, and use of Marriott Library’s license for Primo by Ex Libris, the integrated discovery system that accomplishes metadata harvesting and provides the search portal.

The Mountain West Digital Library operates as a hub-and-spoke distributed networked organization, with three tiers. Thirty regional “hosting hubs” manage digital asset management system repositories and host 699 digital collections from 164 collection partners, including libraries, archives, museums, government agencies, and historical societies. Larger MWDL hosting hubs include the Utah State Archives, University of Utah J. Willard Marriott Library, Brigham Young University Harold B. Lee Library, the Utah State Library, the Arizona Memory Project, University of Nevada Reno Libraries, and the Montana Memory Project. At the center of the organizational structure is the database and portal of the Mountain West Digital Library, which aggregates metadata from the hosting hubs on a regular basis. The responsibilities of collection partners, hosting hubs, and MWDL staff are described in the Mountain West Digital Library Partnership Agreement.

Since 2013, MWDL has received funding from the Digital Public Library of America, under awards to the DPLA from the Bill & Melinda Gates Foundation, the John S. and James L. Knight Foundation, the Institute for Museum and Library Services, and the National Endowment for the Humanities. MWDL staff work closely with DPLA staff to help build out the national network of hubs and to promote the adoption of common practices and standards.

== Collections ==
The Mountain West Digital Library includes digital collections on regional and national topics such as Westward migration, mining, and World War II. The portal is of particular interest to users researching the American West, pioneer history, and Mormon history.

Materials in the Mountain West Digital Library include historical photographs, books, maps, scholarly documents, birth and death records, videos, and sound recordings. The MWDL uses an application profile of the Dublin Core metadata schema so that items in MWDL collections can be searched by author, title, date, subject, geography, and resource type.
