= Emmanuel Saad =

Egyptian composer

Emmanuel Saad is an Egyptian Coptic composer, Music Arranger and one of the most famous composers of the Coptic orthodox music in the current era.

== Biography ==
Emmanuel Saad was born on May 15, 1971. Despite not having a degree in music, he works in audio engineering and music composition, composing soundtracks and music arrangements. He earned a Bachelor's degree in Agriculture in 1993 but his love and passion of music made him study music and delve deeper into the study of Eastern Music scales and Harmony. He excelled at playing the keyboard and Piano from age six and learned to play the accordion in primary school.

== Artistic Journey ==
He served with many singers such as Ibrahim Ayad, Deacon Boulus Malak, Deacon Gergis Feltaous, Sater Mekhael, Sanaa Assad, Emil Girgis, Vivian Alsodaneya, Maher Fayez, Zakaria Hana, Monir Habib, and Fadia Bazy. He served with a lot of teams and choirs such as Little Flock Choir, Saint Rowaise Youth, Virgin of the sky, Youbal Team, David Cords, Coptic David Harp, saint Marina Team, Jesus team, Saint Demiana team, San Nicola Team, Ava Barsoum team, Saint Rowaise young girls team, David "the psalmist" choir, and others.

He served with many churches and Christian assemblies: He served in the church of Virgin Mary Alabasery, until he became secretary service of the choir and praise family for nearly 18 years and the responsible servant for Ava Barsoum choir for youth, at the church of Virgin Mary AL Maadie, for nearly 16 years plus many of the churches and assemblies.

=== His artistic works ===
==== He has composed a very large number of operettas and hymns ====
- The best known operettas are (blood descending from the wood "khashaba sayelmenha dam", before there is a time" ablmaykon el zaman", O` Time come back" 3od yazaman" and hymns such as it is not with words could the heart speak to heaven" Mshbelkalam el alb yetla3 lelsama" from -Silent Monk Film-, Hermit in the journey of life from Hermit Film, in the darkness of sad night, in the sea of evils, my only son, this story started, my memories, in front of your picture I stand to talk to you, and I love you virgin Mary and your spectrum is in my house, which was the first hymn that he composed in 1987 at the age of 16.
- Also Under the cross, Under the tribulations i bent, Cry with tears from the heart, My little heart, Mother's bosom, Oh my mother virgin Mary, No it is not just a picture, The tape of memories, My wounded heart, Yes he is loving, You are the secure, Yes I stabbed Jesus with my hand, The prince of miracles, The journey of tortures and Life took me, All these hymns are for Vivian Alsudaneya and many other hymns works that have been composed by him.

==== He composed a very big number of hymns, operettas and sound tracks of movies ====
- Pope kyrillos VI the hermit movie in March 2000 which was the beginning of a new view of Christian movies soundtracks.
- Father Abdul Meseh Almanahry The Hermit movie in July 2000.
- He won an award of the best soundtracks in the first dramatic festival in Alexandria for Christian movies which was held in Alexandria Library.
- Saint Arbsema movie .
- Documentary Film of Pope ShenoudaIII on the occasion of Silver Jubilee of Holiness Pope Shenouda's enthronement on the seat of St. Mark the Evangelist.
- The martyr saint Abo Fam the oseem soldier.
- The Silent Monk movie which caused a great sensation in the Christian community, its soundtrack was one of the most important success factor, and he got very large number of awards in the Christian festivals.
- TheEthiopian the latest production of Bavly Phone company where he provided a very beautiful music with a very high professionalism which proves that this person can always surprise us with his music in every movie which evolve and change in a very high professionalism.
- The wilderness eagle movie of Abona faltaous el Souriany

==== The most famous musical arrangement works ====
- The series of "Dabdoby" tapes for kids
- Tapes of San Nicola team
- "I relief you" tapes
- "Don’t Fear" for Little Flock Choir
- Tapes of Pope kyrillos VI such as "Within the mill", "Pope is inside the mill", "Aid in the mill" and "lighthouse in the cave". Deacon Michael pastor Ezkiel tapes such as "we miss your appearance, gowanaayshen, his hand's work tape for Deacon GirgisFeltaous, Miracles of Pope kyrillos, Poems of Pope Shenouda III, such as Release of the spirit, Lost in Alienation, of the psalmist David choir.
- Music tapes of Movies which were issues by Bavly Phone company such as the movies of (Pope KYRILLOS VI, Silent Monk, and also the music of Praise God).

==== He wrote words of some hymns ====
- I love you Virgin Mary hymn
- In front of your picture hymn
- From my heart, O Lord hymn

== His works with Christian drama stars ==
- He worked with a large number of Christian drama stars and provided about 70 tapes of (Biography of the saints). He composed hymns with their soundtracks, recording and audio engineering, which were prepared and directed by the great artist Samir Fahmy, where the greatest artists participated in the heroism such as Youssef Dawod, Terez Demian, Maged Al Kedwany, Hani Ramzy, Gamil Bar Som, Nagi Saad, Almontaser Bellah, Ibrahim Nasr, Sanaa Gamil, Farid Al nokrashy, Ehab Sobhy, Shahira Foad and other Christian drama stars.

== Awards and honors ==
- He won first place in playing the organ and accordion at the level of Cairo Governorate and the Republic over three years during his secondary school, and best composer and music arranger in many Youth Bishopric festivals, Heliopolis district festivals and Ain Shams District festivals.
- Musician "Emanuel Saad" won the title of the best soundtrack of "The Hermit" movie in the first orthodox Christian movie festival which was held by call bells assembly in Alexandria.
