= Coptology =

Scientific study of the Coptic people

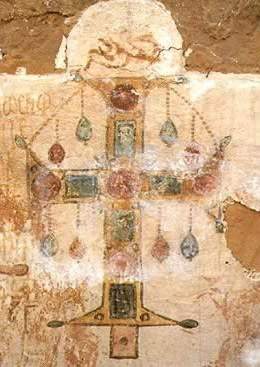
A painting of a cross from Kellia, late 6th century.

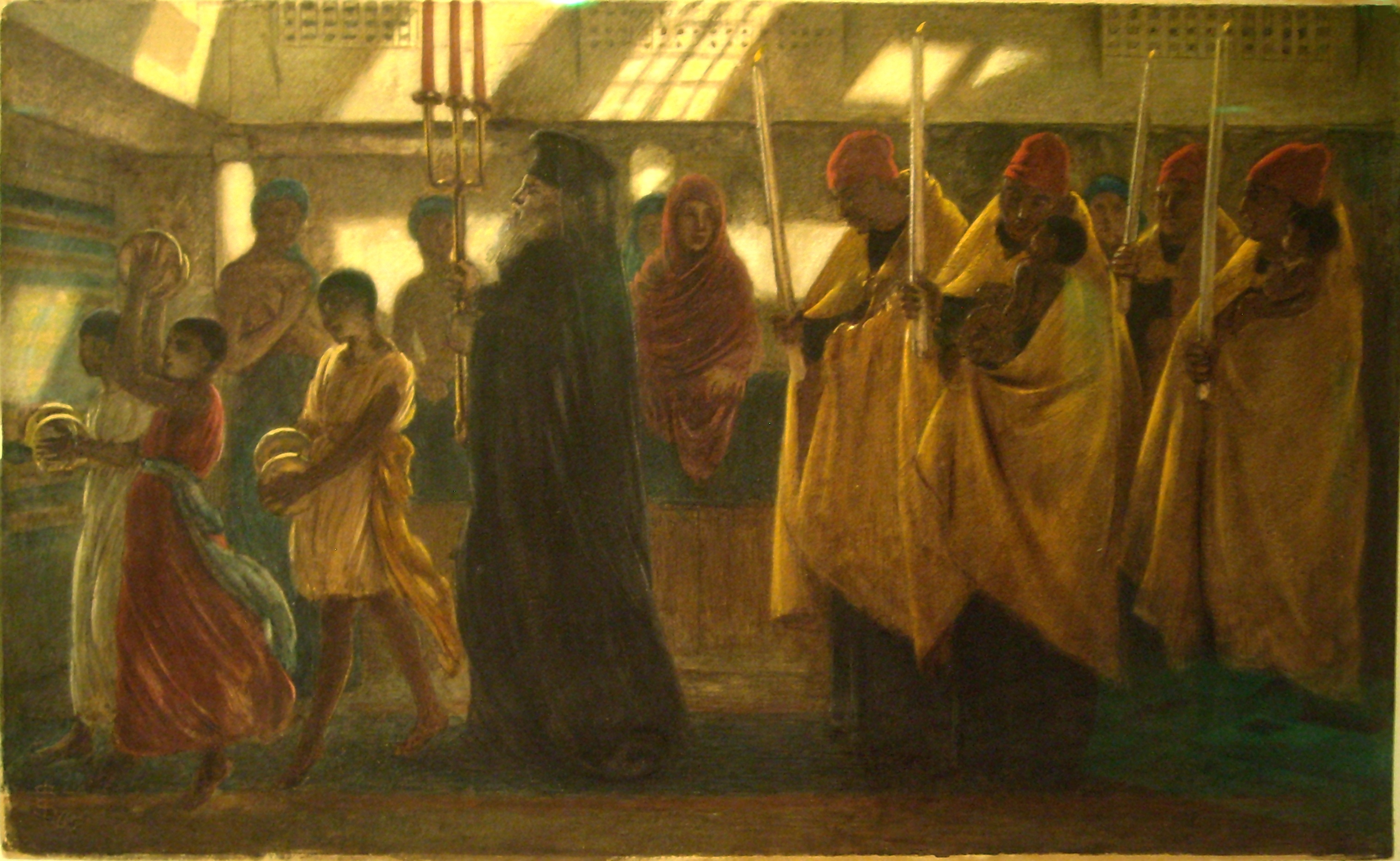
‘Coptic Baptismal Procession’ by English Pre-Raphaelite painter Simeon Solomon, 1865.

Coptology is the scientific study of the Coptic people.

== Origin ==
The European interest in Coptology may have started as early as the 15th century AD. The term was used in 1976 when the First International Congress of Coptology was held in Cairo under the title "Colloquium on the Future of Coptic Studies" (11–17 December). This was followed by the establishment of the "International Association for Coptic Studies". One of the founders of the colloquium and the association was Pahor Labib, director of the Coptic Museum in Cairo during 1951–1965. The words 'Coptology' and 'Coptologist' were introduced into the English language by Aziz Suryal Atiya.

== Worldwide institutions ==
There are now institutions that give more or less regular courses of Coptology in 47 countries around the world, including Australia, Great Britain, Canada, Germany, Israel, Spain, Switzerland, and the United States. A rotating chair of Coptic studies was opened at the American University in Cairo in 2002.

== Divisions ==
- Art and textiles
- Language
- History
- Architecture
- Literature
- Music

== Journals ==
- Coptologia publications - Journal of Coptic Thought and Spirituality
- Journal of Coptic Studies
- Göttinger Miszellen

== Prominent Coptologists ==
- Aziz Suryal Atiya
- O. H. E. Burmester
- Christian Cannuyer
- Walter Ewing Crum
- Iris Habib Elmasry
- Stephen Emmel
- Nabila Erian
- Gawdat Gabra
- Rodolphe Kasser
- Pahor Labib
- Otto Friedrich August Meinardus
- Gorgi Sobhi
- Jozef Vergote
- Hilde Zaloscer

== See also ==
- Christian studies
- Egyptology
- Coptic Egypt: The Christians of the Nile
- Institute of Coptic Studies
