= Chafik Charobim =

Egyptian artist (1894–1975)

- Born: November 4, 1894; Cairo
- Died: 1975 (aged 80–81)
- Citizenship: Egypt
- Education: Academy of Fine Arts in Rome
- Occupations: Painter, visual artist

Chafik Charobim (November 4, 1894 in Cairo – 1975), is a well known impressionist and naturalist Egyptian artist who painted the "Peaceful and Tranquil Egypt of the last Century". He loved nature in any form and his paintings show a great love for the sea, the desert and the people of Egypt. He has left a legacy of over 186 paintings.

== Life ==
Chafik Charobim studied painting at the Academy of Fine Arts in Rome. He lived in Paris and Rome for a few years where he painted and exhibited his art. He dedicated his life to painting.

Charobim's love of freedom and artistic passion led him to paint scenes of everyday life in Egypt. He painted fishermen, villagers, animals and many of his subjects share with him the love of nature and freedom. His paintings show the Nile, the farms, children, animals and all the scenery that one finds in rural life. Charobim loved to paint the sea and had a real love of the Mediterranean, its boats, its tourists and its fishermen. His paintings are intended to show a beautiful, romantic and tranquil Egypt where life was simple and people were carefree.

Charobim loved Lebanon and lived there for a few months each year. Charobim loved to paint its villages and cafés, its valleys and its people.

Charobim advised young artists to always keep busy because he believed a busy artist is a happy one. He also advised them to work hard, paint every day and to keep to a schedule. He used to wake up at 5 a.m. and paint until noon every day.

== Paintings ==
Charobim excelled in small paintings, of moderate dimension, warm colors and exquisite proportions and design. Some of his better-known paintings were:

=== Egypt ===
- Fisherman Resting, 1966
- Swimming in Gerba, 1946
- Houseboat on the Nile, 1956
- Small Nile Branch in Zamalek, 1954

=== Lebanon ===
- Cafe des Sources Hag Elias Lebanon, 1950
- Beit Mary Valley Lebanon, 1950
- Douhour El Chouer Lebanon, 1950

== See also ==
- Egyptians
- List of Egyptians
- Copts
- List of prominent Copts

== Sources ==
- CHAFIK CHAROBIM, PEINTRE EGYPTIEN by Dominique Roussel, 2001. ISBN 2-912964-31-8
- charobim.com, a site dedicated to the work of Chafik Charobim
