= Gawdat Gabra =

Egyptian Coptologist

- جودت جبرا
- Born: 1947 (age 78–79)
- Education: Cairo University; University of Münster
- Occupation: Coptologist
- Employers: Coptic Museum; Claremont Graduate University

Gawdat Gabra (born 1947) (Arabic: جودت جبرا, Coptic: Ⲅⲁⲩⲇⲁⲧ Ⲅⲁⲃⲣⲁ) is an Egyptian Coptologist.

== Education ==
Gabra received his bachelor's degree in Egyptian antiquities from Cairo University in 1967 and his PhD in Coptic antiquities from the University of Münster in Germany in 1978. He also studied at the Institute of Egyptology of Charles University in Prague.

== Career ==
Gabra is the former director of the Coptic Museum in Cairo, a post he held from 1985. He is a visiting professor in Coptic studies at Claremont Graduate University.

== Selected works ==
Gabra is the author or co-author of, among other titles:

- Christianity and Monasticism in Upper Egypt: Akhmim and Sohag (Gabra and Takla 2008)
- The Churches of Egypt: From the Journey of the Holy Family to the Present Day (Gabra, Van Loon, and Sonbol 2007)
- The Treasures of Coptic Art in the Coptic Museum and Churches of Old Cairo (Alcock and Gabra 2007)
- Coptic Monasteries: Egypt's Monastic Art and Architecture (Gabra and Vivian 2002)
- Christian Egypt: Coptic Art and Monuments Through Two Millennia (Capuani, Meinardus, Rutschowscaya and Gabra 2002)
- Icons of the Nile Valley (main author Zuzana Skálová; Egyptian International Publishing Company – Longman, 1st Edition 2003, 2nd Edition 2006; ISBN 978-977-16-0588-1)
- Be Thou There: The Holy Family's Journey in Egypt (Gabra 2001)

Gabra also contributed the following articles to the Coptic Encyclopedia:

- "Saint Pisentius" (co-authored with C. Detlef G. Muller)
- "Nabis"
- "Patape" (co-authored with Rene-Georges Coquin)
- "Hajir Idfu"

== See also ==
- List of Copts
- Coptic Museum
