= Utah Academic Library Consortium =

American academic organization for improving research availability

The Utah Academic Library Consortium (UALC) is an organization of Utah libraries of not-for-profit educational and research universities and institutions. UALC was established in 1971 to improve the availability and delivery of information services to the higher education community and the State of Utah. It was formed to maximize state resources, foster research, and advocate for excellent library resources.

In 2001, members of the Utah Academic Library Consortium founded the Mountain West Digital Library, a digital library aggregator for memory institutions in the Mountain West. Since 2013, the Mountain West Digital Library has been the regional service hub for the Digital Public Library of America for the Mountain West, sending over 900,000 items to the national digital library.

== Member Libraries ==
- Brigham Young University, Harold B. Lee Library
- Brigham Young University, Howard W. Hunter Law Library
- The Church of Jesus Christ of Latter-day Saints, Church History Library
- Dixie State University Library
- Salt Lake Community College Libraries
- Snow College, Karen H. Huntsman Library
- Southern Utah University, Gerald R. Sherratt Library
- University of Utah, J. Willard Marriott Library
- University of Utah, Spencer S. Eccles Health Sciences Library
- University of Utah, S.J. Quinney Law Library
- Utah State Library
- Utah State University, Merrill-Cazier Library
- Utah Valley University Library
- Weber State University, Stewart Library
- Westminster College, Giovale Library
