= Hilana Sedarous =

Egyptian physician

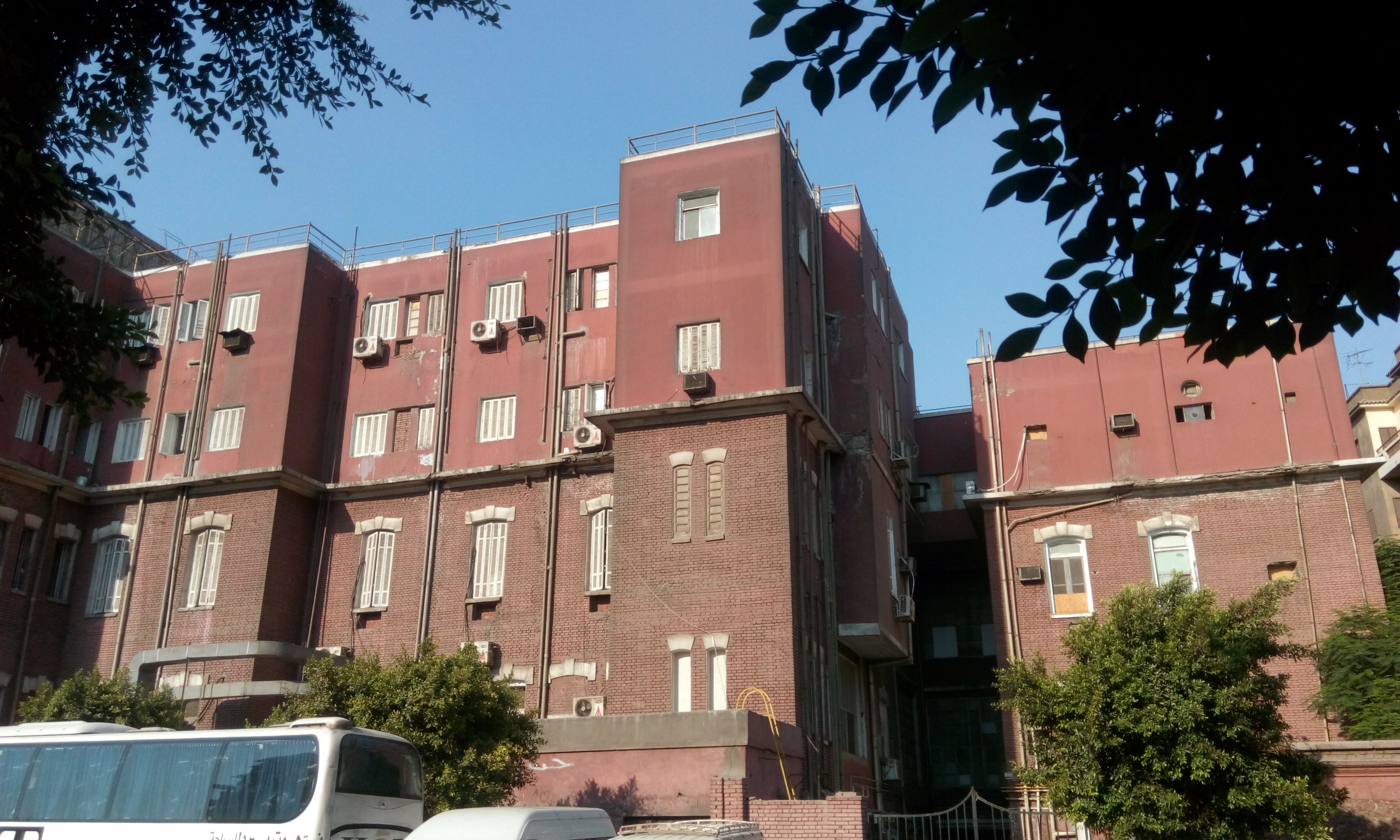
Coptic Hospital in Cairo

Dr. Hilana Sedarous (1904-1998) was a Coptic Egyptian physician. She was the first woman to become a doctor in Egypt.

== Education ==
After finishing her primary education, Hilana Sedarous enrolled at "Madraset Al Saneyah" (a girls' boarding school in Cairo). She later went to a teacher training university, where after 2 years (in 1922), she received a scholarship and was sent with 5 other female Egyptian students to London to study mathematics. She, along with Zainab Kamel, were considered to be the first female Egyptian students to be sent to study in England. She also enrolled at London School of Medicine, where she became a certified physician and finished her doctorate in 1930.

== Career ==
Dr. Sedarous returned to Egypt becoming the first female doctor in Egypt. She worked in Kitchener Hospital (Shoubra General Hospital), Cairo, carrying out her surgical procedures at the Coptic Hospital. She also opened a private clinic. She specialized in obstetrics and gynaecology.

== Retirement ==
Dr. Sedarous retired in her seventies. After retiring, she dedicated herself to translating stories and books for children. Dr. Sedarous was well known for her selflessness and generosity, and she had a soft spot for orphans and orphanages. She donated most of her massive wealth throughout her lifetime to all sorts of charitable causes.

== Death ==
Dr. Sedarous died in 1998

== See also ==
- List of notable Egyptians
- List of notable Copts
