= University of Utah Middle East Center =

- Type: Public
- Established: 1960
- Location: Salt Lake City, Utah, USA
- Campus: Map
- Website: www.mec.utah.edu

The University of Utah Middle East Center is located on the campus of the University of Utah in Salt Lake City, Utah. The center was officially established in 1960 and offers both undergraduate and graduate degrees. The Center was established under the influence of scholar Dr. Aziz Atiya. The Center has established graduate and undergraduate programs in Persian, Arabic, Hebrew, and Turkish, as well as cultural and historical studies of the region. The Center has administered degree programs at all levels (B.A., M.A., and Ph.D.) and offers, both to students and to the larger community, a variety of opportunities for the advancement of understanding of the Middle East. Such opportunities have included conferences, lecture series, workshops, continuing education courses, and outreach activities. Distinguished scholars of the Middle East from all over the world are invited to participate in many of these events, and conference papers normally result in published volumes. In addition, the MEC is able to arrange opportunities for intensive language study, fieldwork and research in a number of countries of the Middle East.

== Aziz Atiya Library ==
The Aziz Atiya Library, which is named after the founder of the Middle East Center Aziz Suryal Atiya, is the fifth largest library for Middle East studies in North America. It contains over 160,000 books, monographs, and periodicals, including works written in Arabic, Hebrew, Persian, Ottoman Turkish, and modern Turkish. The collection is housed in the J. Willard Marriott Library.
