= Magdy Ishak =

Egyptian surgeon

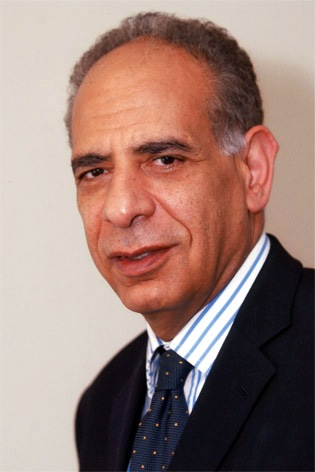
- Born: 1947 (age 78–79); Suez, Egypt
- Occupations: Physician, Businessman

Magdy A Ishak MD, FRCS, CCIM (born 1947 in Suez, Egypt), is an orthopedic surgeon and the President of the Egyptian Medical Society UK. He is also Chairman of the Scottish-Egyptian Association and Vice Chairman of the British Egyptian Society. he is also Chairman of M I Holdings. He is honorary Companion Chartered Institute of Management.

Magdy is married to Rita GadelRab, a consultant anesthetist, and has one daughter, Lorraine, a maxillofacial surgeon.

== See also ==
- List of Copts
- Lists of Egyptians
