= William Collier Smithers =

William Collier Smithers (29 July 1795 – 19 February 1861) was an English author and classicist.

Rev. Smithers D.D. was born in Greenwich, England, the eldest son of Joseph Peach Smithers, Drawing Master, and his wife Elizabeth Harding while they were living at Maze Hill.

Smithers matriculated from Queen’s College, Oxford on 23 June 1813 aged 17. He subsequently became a Deacon and Curate on 28 September 1818, and a Priest in Holy Orders in January 1821. He was Curate at Charlton, Woolwich in 1818 and he served the cure of St Alfege Church, Greenwich for 18 years

In 1826 he published the first edition of ‘The Classical Students Manual’ “containing an index on every page, section, and note in Matthiae's Greek grammar, Hermann's annotations to Viger on idioms, Bos on Ellipses, Hoogeveen in the particles, and Kuster on the middle verb; in which Thucydides, Herodotus, Aeschylus, Sophocles, Pindar, Homer's Iliad, Xenophon's Anabasis, and the four plays of Euripides edited by Porson, are illustrated; with philological and explanatory observations; intended for students in the universities, and the higher classes in schools”.

William Collier Smithers established a school at Park Place, Greenwich, of which he was Principal and whose pupils included the poet William Cox Bennett until the age of nine.

He married Amelia Oldershaw, with whom he had 11 children.

William Collier Smithers was the grandfather of Collier Twentyman Smithers, the rustic artist; Sir Alfred Waldron Smithers MP, and Ernest Newlandsmith; and great grandfather of the film editor Adam Alexander Dawson, Sir Peter Smithers, and Sir Waldron Smithers MP.

== Works ==
- The Classical Student's Manual, William Collier Smithers, First edition, London, 1826.
- The Classical Student's Manual, William Collier Smithers, Second edition. London, 1827.
- The Classical Student's Manual, William Collier Smithers, Third edition. London, 1844.
