= Jozef Vergote =

Belgian egyptologist (1910–1992)

Jozef Antoon Leo Maria Vergote (16 March 1910 – 8 January 1992) was a Flemish Egyptologist and Coptologist.

He was born on 16 March 1910 in Gent, Belgium. He received his doctorate degree in classical philology and oriental languages in 1932 from the Catholic University of Leuven. He continued his studies in Paris, and in Berlin (1934–1937), where he worked under Kurt Heinrich Sethe, Hermann Grapow, and Rudolph Anthes. He taught Coptic and ancient Egyptian at the Catholic University of Leuven from 1938 until his retirement in 1978.

He was the editor of Orientalia Lovaniensia Periodica. His publications include Joseph en Égypte (1959), Toutankhamon dans les archives hittites (1961), and Grammaire copte (1973–1983).

He died in Heverlee, Belgium on 8 January 1992.

== Bibliography ==
- Obsomer, Claude (2021). "L'Égyptologie à l'Université de Louvain (1891-2019)" [Egyptology at the University of Louvain (1891-2019)]. In: Courtois, Luc (ed.). Les études orientales à l'Université de Louvain depuis 1834. Hommes et réalisations. Brussels: Éditions Safran, ISBN 978-2-87457-124-4, pp. 159-174, esp. pp. 167-168.
