= Alfred Farag =

Egyptian playwright

Alfred Morcos Farag
- Born: 14 June 1929; Kafr Al-Sayyadin, Zagazig, Egypt
- Died: 4 December 2005 (aged 76); London, UK
- Occupation: Playwright
- Writing career
- Notable works: Al-Zeir Salim; Baghdad Barber; Suleiman Al-Halabi; Genah el-Tabreezilabi

Alfred Farag (14 June 1929 – 4 December 2005 ) was an Egyptian playwright. He was one of the eminent Egyptian playwrights of Nasser-era Egypt . He obtained his BA in English Literature from the Faculty of Arts, Alexandria University in 1949. He then began a teaching career that lasted until 1955, when he abandoned it for a post in the press as a literary critic. He worked at several press institutions, including: “Rose El Youssef”, “El Tahrir” and “Al Gomhouriyya”.

Farag took part in the establishment of the public management for Althaqafa al-Gamahyria “ culture for the masses” project and in the foundation of artistic groups in Egypt. The project cultural centres known as "cultural palaces" in many towns, . Theatre groups, and book clubs were main activities but was controlled by the regime. The project enabled Farag to play an important role in the introduction of theatre in Egypt's provinces especially in remote countryside areas. He, with many great writers like Noaman Ashour, Saad Eddin Wahba, Michael Roman, Rashad Roushdy and Yousef Edrees, contributed in the “nothing like” renaissance of theatre in the sixties.

Alfred Farag wrote his first play “Fall of Pharaoh” (1957) at the age of 26. He then proceeded with his career as a writer. He wrote approximately 52 plays, including: “The Barber of Baghdad” (1964), “Sulayman Al-Halabi” (1965), “Al-Zayr Salim” (1967) and “Atwa with the Jack-Knife” (1993), in addition to some one-act plays such as “Voice of Egypt” (1956) and “The Trap” (1965). In his plays, he discusses serious issues like the problem of national independence in “The Epistles of the Judge of Seville” (1987), and the Palestinian issue in “Fire and Olives” (1970). Some of his works were translated into German and English such as “Ali Janah Al - Tabrizi and his Servant Quffa” (1969) or into English only such as “Marriage By Decree Nisi ” (1973), and " The Trap" in 1977. In addition to being a playwright, he also wrote novels such as “The Story of the Lost Time” (1977) and “The Days and Nights of Sindbad” (1988), and short stories. In his writings, he eloquently mixed the Egyptian Colloquial Arabic with the Standard Arabic which made his works unique and easy for people to understand. Critics became interested in Farag's dramatic language as it was vivid and far from the formal style used by his predecessors. He believed that the language should contribute in giving a “visual” illustration of the text What made him different from others is that he revived the old heritage on stage as if it was real, and that he used heritage without getting superficial.

Having suffered in the hands of the authoritarian regime of Colonel Gamal Abdel Nasser when the latter rounded up Marxist groups and intellectuals in 1950s and 1960s (and some stayed in jail until late 1960s which explains a gap of four years of publishing works by Farag between 1957 and 1963), Farag used stories from Egyptian folklore or from early Abbasid empire period (750-1258 AD), to avoid displeasing the regime, while trying to convey a subtle message. Farag plays especially in the latter period in the late 1960s used events from history, or names to symbolise what he tried to express. “There was an unwritten understanding, or call it a conspiracy, between playwrights, producers, actors and theatre goers to bypass the censor,” Farag told Journalist Adel Darwish in 1978. Darwish directed two of Farag Plays. Gawaz Ala Warqet Talaq (Marriage by Decree Nisi) about a marriage between an aristocrat and a poor girl highlighting social injustices. The two-act play was translated in 1975 by Arabist Ken Whittingham and performed in London in 1975 at SOAS School of Oriental and African Studies theatre and 1976 at London University Theatre and other venues. But with the personae and references the production dropped strong hints that social injustice in Egypt increased under the republican regime despite the, largely untrue, claims that the 1952 coup by the army officers was to end the alleged class privileges and create a more egalitarian society. Farag's second play, Alfakh ( The trap) a one act two handers play, was mostly a conversation between a corrupt mayor in upper Egypt and his head of guards on how to trap an outlaw highwayman who has been in cahoots with the mayor. But when the mayor thinks that the authorities suspect his dealing with the outlaw, he decided to sacrifice the outlaw and gets the reward for his arrest. The Trap was performed as part of a two bill show with another Egyptian one act play by Mahmoud Diab ( 1932–1983) called “ Strangers Don’t Drink Coffee “ ( Alghorba’a la yashrboon al-Qahwa ) in 1977- The Trap was translated by Whittingham and Diab's play was translated by Darwish and Whittingham. The performances were held in different London fringe venues and a long season at the Africa Centre (then in Covent Garden) in 1977 financed by GLAA (Greater London Arts Association) and the Africa Centre with contribution from the Egyptian Cultural Centre in UK. Farag, after Colonel Nasser's death became supporter of Nasser's socialist agenda, pan-Arabism and hostility to Israel and the west. He joined the left wing and marxists groups' opposition to the late President Anwar Sadat's policy especially his liberalisation of the economy and moving to make peace with Israel. Farag went into a voluntary exile, first to Algeria, then Paris, and then moved to London in 1978. He became the culture and arts editor of the london based Egyptian weekly Twenty Third of July. Named after 23d July 1952, the date of the military coup that propelled Colonel Nasser to power, it became a platform for Egyptian writers and intellectuals and was bitterly opposed to the Egyptian Israeli Peace accords and the subsequent peace treaty.He remained in London until his death in 2005.

Farag was granted several international, Arab and Egyptian awards and medals. The best known award was “Jerusalem” given by the General Union for Arab Writers as he was the first Egyptian intellectual to receive such an award. He also received the National Award for Playwriting in 1965, and the Science and Arts Medal of the first order in 1967. Farag died on 4 December 2005 at the age of 76 in the St Mary's Hospital, London after a long term of illness. He was buried in Cairo.

== Bibliography ==
- The Fall of the Pharaoh ( Soqote phroan) 1956.
- Egypt's Voice ( Sout Masr) 1957.
- Baghdad Barber (Hallaa' Baghdad), 1964.
- Suleiman Al-Halabi, 1965.
- Policemen and burglars (a'askar wa haramiah) 1966.
- Al-Zeir Salim, 1966.
- The Trap ( Alfakh) 1966.
- Lazy Boq Boq ( Boq Boq al-kaslan) 1967.
- Ala Genah el-Tabreezi wa tabiu'ahu quffa, 1969.
- Directory of the smart spectator to theater- study- 1969.
- The lost Time in an Egyptian Village ( hkayat al-zaman - aldae'h fi Qaeyah masriyah) a novel 1977.

== See also ==
- List of Copts
- Lists of Egyptians
