= Adel Kamel =

Coptic composer

- Born: January 1, 1942
- Died: January 1, 2003 (aged 61)
- Citizenship: Egypt
- Occupations: Musicologist; Composer; Music critic

Adel Kamel (1942–2003) عادل كامل was a music critic, musicologist and composer.

He was one of the writers in Watani newspaper, the founder of “Panorama” section, a lecturer in Universities in Egypt and abroad, a member of the jury in international choir competitions, a member of many international organizations, and also had several publications.

He felt that there is something deep in the Coptic music and he was fascinated by many Coptic hymns, besides his studies and appreciation of the classical music. In 1991 he was thinking very strongly in both classical and Coptic music.

== Works ==
- In 1993 he started thinking about his project, which was dealing with Coptic themes arranged in Classical Music forms with 20th-century compositional techniques.
- In 1996 he composed “Fugue on a Coptic theme” followed by “Agios”; these two were not only music compositions but they were also a research, in which he had earned a PhD in from the Zoltan Kodaly Pedagogical Institute of Music (Kesckemet, Hungary), and Coptic institute in Cairo.
- "Fugue on a Coptic theme" is dealing with the Coptic theme "Golgotha" presented in a 17th-century baroque three-voice polyphonic texture with 20th-century compositional techniques.
- “Agios” presents the Coptic theme "Agios the prolonged" in "18th-century" Classical Period style, melody with accompaniment and harmonic three voice texture with 20th-century compositional techniques.

These two works were written originally for trio, but in 2001 a piano transcription was made by Dr. Adel Kamel and Nabil K. Agaiby.

- In 2002 he composed “Al el Orbana”, as a prelude to the Fugue, and its dealing with the theme “Al El Orbana" arranged in 20th-century composition style, was written for Piano solo.
- In October 2002 he wrote his last composition “Melodie Copte", a monophonic theme in a Dorian mode.
- Dr. Adel by his works connected two periods which are 2000 years apart, and presented features of several civilizations in just one piece of music; also these works could be the first classical compositions dealing with materials related to the first centuries AD.

== See also ==
- List of Copts
- Coptic music
