= Anna Campbell Bliss =

American painter and architect

- Born: July 10, 1925; Morristown, New Jersey, U.S.
- Died: October 12, 2015 (aged 90); Salt Lake City, Utah, U.S.
- Occupations: Visual artist, architect
- Spouse: Robert Bliss (1947–2015)

Anna Campbell Bliss (July 10, 1925 – October 12, 2015) was an American visual artist and architect. Her trademark artwork blends color, lights, mathematics, movement, science and technology. A modernist artist, Bliss, who was a pioneer of early computer generated art during the 1960s, was one of the first artists to utilize computer technology in her artwork. Examples of her work are included in the collections of the Art Institute of Chicago, the Cliff Lodge in Alta, the J. Willard Marriott Library, the Metropolitan Museum of Art, the Utah Museum of Contemporary Art, Southern Utah Museum of Art, and the Utah Museum of Fine Arts. She also designed houses with her husband, architect and professor Robert Bliss, through their architectural practice, Bliss & Campbell Architects.

Bliss was based in Salt Lake City for much of her career. Some of her largest and best known work can be found throughout Salt Lake City and the surrounding region, including her first public commission, "Windows", a 30-foot mural composed of squares which was installed from 1989 to 1990 at the former date processing center at the Utah State Capitol; "Light of Grace", a stained glass wall of windows installed at Saint Thomas More Catholic Church in Sandy, Utah, in 1993; and "Extended Vision", installed from 2001 to 2003, a series of screenprinted and etched plates which are on display in the lobby of the Cowles Mathematics Building at the University of Utah. One of Bliss' major art commissions included "Discoverers," a mural recalling the topography of Salt Lake City, which was officially unveiled in Concourse E of Salt Lake City International Airport in 1996. During the creation of "Discoverers," tested the attitudes of socially conservative Utah by including nudes in the mural. However, as she later explained in a 2012 interview, ""I included nudes in a minor way, just to establish a relationship between the ideas and people...Because of local attitudes, I couldn't have the nudes." Instead, she added computer generated figures to the airport's mural at the suggestion of one of her assistants.

== Biography ==
Bliss was born Anna Campbell in Morristown, New Jersey, on July 10, 1925. She attended Wellesley College, where she received her bachelor's degree in art history and mathematics in 1946. In 1950, Campbell completed a master's degree in architecture from Harvard University. She, who was influenced by Bauhaus, also studied art theory under György Kepes at M.I.T. and later became a student of Josef Albers through a workshop in Minnesota. She also studied engineering at New York University.

Campbell, who was 22-years old at the time, met her future husband, Robert Bliss, who was 26, at a dinner party in 1947. They married after just three months together and remained together 68 years. They traveled throughout Europe after their wedding. Robert Bliss was hired as an architecture teacher in Minnesota in 1954. The couple soon established their own architectural firm, Bliss & Campbell Architects. Together, Anna Campbell Bliss and her husband designed residential homes which incorporated their natural surroundings.

Robert Bliss applied, and was hired, as the dean of the Department of Architecture at the University of Utah, now called the College of Architecture + Planning, in 1963. He served as dean from 1963 until 1986, which necessitated a move from Minnesota to Utah. Anna Campbell Bliss initially disliked her relocation to Utah, telling the Salt Lake Tribune in 2012, "I was very involved with the Walker [Art Center] and Minneapolis' art scene. I didn't find that degree of stimulation in the art world here." To combat this, Bliss enrolled in screen printing and computer programming courses and studied movement and dance at the Utah Repertory Dance Theatre to find inspiration. She incorporated these influences into her work.

Bliss began to lose her eyesight to macular degeneration during the 2000s. She regained her sight through a series of eye injections administered every six weeks for a six-month period at the Moran Eye Center at the University of Utah.

Filmmaker Cid Collins Walker, a Utah-based near Washington D.C., produced and directed a 2010 documentary focusing on Bliss' life and career called "Arc of Light: A Portrait of Anna Campbell Bliss."

Anna Campbell Bliss died at her home in Salt Lake City on October 12, 2015, at the age of 90. She was survived by her husband of 68 years, Robert Bliss. Her funeral was held at the Cathedral of the Madeleine.
