= Leonidas Ralph Mecham =

American government official (1928–2019)

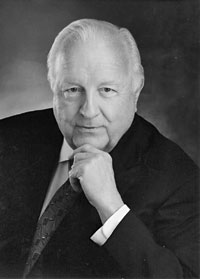

Director of the Administrative Office of the United States Courts
- In office July 15, 1985 – May 2006
- Appointed by: Warren Burger
- Succeeded by: James C. Duff

Personal details
- Born: April 23, 1928 Murray, Utah, U.S.
- Died: March 9, 2019 (aged 90)
- Education: University of Utah (BS); George Washington University (JD); Harvard University (MPA)

Leonidas Ralph Mecham (April 23, 1928 – March 9, 2019) was the former Director of the Administrative Office of the United States Courts, having served in that position from 1985 to 2006. He was appointed to the position by United States Chief Justice Warren Burger in July 1985.

== Biography ==
Ralph Mecham was born April 23, 1928, in Murray, Utah. He obtained his B.S. degree in political science from the University of Utah (1951); a Juris Doctor degree from George Washington University (1963), and a master's degree (in public administration) from Harvard University.

His initial government position was as a legislative assistant and administrative assistant to U.S. Senator Wallace F. Bennett, eventually becoming the Senator's chief of staff. After that, he served as vice president of, and taught constitutional law at, the University of Utah. He returned to Washington, resuming government service as a special assistant to the United States Secretary of Commerce. He was named head of the Administrative Office on July 15, 1985.

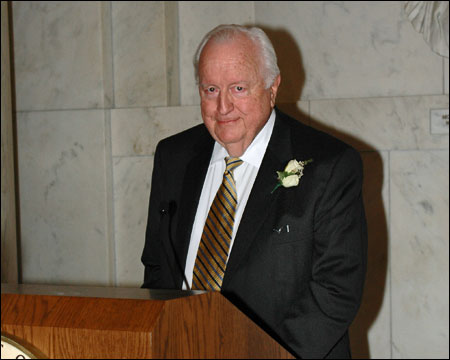
Mecham accepting an honor at the 2006 Judicial Conference.

Mecham was the longest-serving Director of the Administrative Office, retiring after more than 20 years in April 2006. One of the principles that Mecham spearheaded during his lengthy tenure was court budget and management decentralization, permitting individual courts to set their own local policies and spending priorities within broad national guidelines.

Mecham's official papers are now housed at the University of Utah Marriott Library.

He died March 9, 2019.

== Personal life ==
Mecham was married (wife Barbara) and as of 2006 had 5 children and 14 grandchildren. He was a member of the Church of Jesus Christ of Latter-day Saints.

== Controversies ==
In 2001, during his tenure as Director of the Administrative Office, the AO began monitoring the Internet communications of the judicial branch. Led by Ninth Circuit Judge Alex Kozinski, the Federal Judges Association, which represents about 85% of U.S. federal judges, adopted a resolution opposing the monitoring. Mecham accused Kozinski of having a "great interest in keeping pornography available to judges," saying that Kozinski was "advocating his passionate views that judges are free, undetected, to download pornography and Napster music on government computers in federal court buildings on government time even though some of the downloading may constitute felonies."

Seven years later, on November 24, 2008, Mecham filed a formal ethics complaint in the Court of Appeals for the Third Circuit in Philadelphia against then-Chief Judge Kozinski and two other judges, for their acts disabling the monitor.
