= Wajih Fanous =

Lebanese literary critic, academic and researcher (1948–2022)

- وجيه فانوس
- Born: Mohammed Wajih Sobhi Fanous; 21 April 1948; Beirut, Lebanon
- Died: 13 July 2022 (aged 74); Beirut, Lebanon
- Education: Lebanese University; St. Anthony's College (PhD)
- Occupations: Author, researcher, academic, literary critic

Mohammed Wajih Sobhi Fanous (known as Wajih Fanous, Arabic: وجيه فانوس, romanized: Wjyh Fanws; 1948 – 13 July 2022) was a Lebanese literary critic, academic, and researcher. He wrote about twenty books, including literary criticism, cultural heritage, Islamic civilization, and contemporary themes. Some of his works have been translated into French. He held a number of cultural, intellectual, and academic positions, and was honored on several occasions.

== Early life ==
Muhammad Wajih Subhi Fanous was born in Burj Abi Haidar, a neighborhood of Beirut, in 1948, and his father, Sobhi, was one of the Qabban money dealers. He received his first studies in the schools of the Al-Maqasid Islamic Charitable Association (Othman Dhi Al-Nurin Elementary and Ali Bin Abi Talib High School), and graduated from high school in 1967 from Raml Al-Zarif Official High School in Beirut. He completed his higher education at the Lebanese University in the specialization of Arabic language and literature, and educational sciences from the College of Education, and obtained a degree of proficiency (masters) in the specialization of Arabic language and literature in 1973. His thesis was titled "Omar Zaani and His Poetry."

He was elected at that stage as a member of the Student Branch Council in the College of Education from 1969 to 1971. He also continued to study history and archeology in the College of Arts and Humanities at the Lebanese University. As a result of his excellence, he obtained a scholarship to pursue his graduate studies at the University of Oxford in England. He was the first student from the Lebanese University to be accepted into this university. He graduated with a PhD in Literary Criticism, obtaining a PhD in Comparative Literary Criticism from St. Anthony's College, Oxford in 1980. His doctoral thesis was titled "Aspects of the Lebanese Contribution to Modern Arabic Literary Criticism." During his studies in England, he was elected the first secretary of the Lebanese Students' Union in Britain and Northern Ireland from 1975 to 1979. Upon his return to Lebanon, he was appointed a lecturer at the Lebanese University until his retirement.

== Career ==
In addition to academic teaching at the Faculty of Arts and Human Sciences at the Lebanese University, Fanous assumed many tasks, including his election as a representative of professors, and director of the first branch for two consecutive sessions from 1986 to 1992, and he also took over the presidency of the Arabic Language and Literature Department in the faculty for six years.

He attained the rank of professorship at the Lebanese University in 1990, and held the positions of visiting professor, lecturer, academic advisor, member of arbitration committees, and debating member in several Lebanese and Arab universities. He also lectured at the American University of Beirut, Beirut Arab University, and the Military School, and was appointed the Academic Adviser to the President of the Islamic University of Lebanon, and Head of the Graduate Studies Department at the Faculty of Arts at the university.

Fanous held many positions, including presiding over the Cultural Dialogue Panel and the Lebanese Writers Union, and was member of the Economic and Social Council, representing Lebanese writers after being chosen by the President of Lebanon in 2018. He also chaired the Islamic Cultural Center، the National Action Symposium، and Mahmoud Darwish's chair at the Modern University for Business and Science.

He has written dozens of articles and studies in both Arabic and English, published in specialized Arab and Western periodicals, in addition to literary, cultural, educational and social seminars and lectures in a large number of specialized and public forums in Lebanon and the Arab world.

Fanous, by virtue of his academic specialization in literary criticism, and comparative literary criticism in particular, and the worlds of what is called "beyond criticism", was interested in his academic research, in the narrow sense of specialization, and was interested in the academic dimension of literary criticism; however, he has always addressed the general public by pursuing the fields of cultural criticism in his writings and other works in the general cultural spheres. This does not mean, at all, as he said in an interview with him:

"Cultural criticism is not included in the domain of academia, but this time it is the academic fold that does not view literary material as merely rigid linguistic, rhetorical or synthetic entities, but rather as a complex product that arises from the interaction of many cognitive and cultural matters of culture as elements of human living of thought, expression and beauty, in between."

== Lebanese Writers Union ==
Fanous was elected Secretary General of the Lebanese Writers Union in 2015, and Vice President of the Arab Writers Union, and in 2019 he was elected General Adviser to the General Secretariat of the General Union of Arab Writers for the next four years. During his tenure in the secretariat of the Lebanese Writers Union, he sought to secure financial support that would serve as a continuous source of revenue for the Union, but he resigned from the Union on 2 April 2019, announcing his resignation in a brief statement, stating:

'I announce my resignation from the position of Secretary General of the Lebanese Writers Union and from the membership of its administrative body, wishing the Union every success and progress."

== Death ==
Fanous died on 13 July 2022, at the age of 74 in Beirut.

== Works ==
Fanous has several writings, studies and research papers, and books published in both Arabic and English, including:

- 1988: Arabic: الأدب المقارن وحكايتا حب, romanized: aladb almqarn whkayta hb, lit. 'Comparative Literature and Two Love Stories'
- 1991: Arabic: دراسات في حركية الفكر الأدبيّ, romanized: drasat fy hrkyh alfkr aladby, lit. 'Studies in the Kinetics of Literary Thought'
- 1992: Adventures In Literary Criticism
- 1993: Arabic: الرَّيحاني والمعرّي, romanized: alryhany walm'ery, lit. 'Al-Rihani and Al-Maarri'
- 1995: Arabic: محاولات في الشِّعري والجمالي, romanized: mhawlat fy alsh'ery waljmaly, lit. 'Attempts at Poetry and Aesthetics'
- 1996: Arabic: أحداث من السِّيرة النَّبويَّة في مرايا مُعاصرة, romanized: ahdath mn alsyrh alnbwyh fy mraya mu'easrh, lit. 'Events from the Prophet's Biography in Contemporary Mirrors'
- 1998: Arabic: الأدب العربي, romanized: aladb al'erby, lit. 'Arabic Literature' (three parts, secondary education; co-author)
- 1998: A Collection Of Literary Studies
- 2001: Arabic: مخاطبات من الضفَّة الأخرى للنَّقد الأدبي, romanized: mkhatbat mn aldfh alakhra llnqd aladby, lit. 'Correspondence from the Other Side of Literary Criticism'
- 2003: Arabic: العلاقات العامَّة في المؤسَّسات الأهليَّة, romanized: al'elaqat al'eamh fy alm'essat alahlyh, lit. 'Public Relations in NGOs'
- 2004: Arabic: إشارات من التَّثاقف العربيّ مع التَّغريب في القرن العشرين, romanized: esharat mn altthaqf al'erby m'e altghryb fy alqrn al'eshryn, lit. 'Signs of Arab Acculturation with Westernization in the Twentieth Century'
- 2012: Arabic: لمحات من النَّقد الأدبي الجديد, romanized: lmhat mn alnqd aladby aljdyd, lit. 'Glimpses of New Literary Criticism'
- 2012: Ameen Rihani’s Arab American Legacy: From Romanticism To Postmodernism (co-author)
- 2014: شفيق جدايل حكاية صوت, shfyq jdayl hkayh swt, 'Shafiq Jadayel Audio Story'

=== Radio works ===
He also wrote several radio and drama programs, including:

- Arabic: حكاية عمر, romanized: hkayh 'emr, lit. 'Omar's Story'
- Arabic: موزيكا يا دنيا, romanized: mwzyka ya dnya, lit. 'Music, My World'
- Arabic: قضايا وآراء ومن حكايات العرب والبثّ المباشر, romanized: qdaya wara' wmn hkayat al'erb walbth almbashr, lit. 'Issues, Opinions, Stories from the Arabs, and Live Broadcasts'
