= Youssef Sidhom =

Egyptian newspaper editor

Youssef Sidhom is the editor-in-chief of the Egyptian weekly newspaper Watany, the only Christian newspaper in Egypt. He is the son of Watani's founder, Anton Sidhom.

Youssef Sidhom is a prominent advocate of Coptic Christian rights in Egypt.
