= Raouf Salama Moussa =

Egyptian bacteriologist and editor

Dr Raouf Salama Moussa (1929–2006, Arabic: رؤوف سلامة موسى) was a notable Egyptian bacteriologist and editor.

He was the first and eldest son of Salama Moussa, a famous Coptic Egyptian journalist and reformer in the 1920s.

After his school days he studied Veterinary Medicine and Bacteriology in Leeds, England. Until 1979 he taught Bacteriology at the University of Alexandria/Egypt and worked as a Salmonella specialist for an international aliment company in Vevey, Switzerland.

From 1978 Dr Moussa returned to Egypt and founded a publishing and printing house, Al-Mustaqbal (The Future), which became one of the best known readers in the Arabic World in a very short time.

Besides his various articles in newspapers and magazines Al-Mustaqbal offers works about his father Salama Moussa, by the famous Islam-Critic Farag Fouda, who was murdered in 1992, the Egyptian Psychiatrist Nawâl El Saadâwi, various scientific books, dictionaries and literature about Egyptian Geography, History and Culture in Arabic, English, German and French.
