= Kamal Stino =

Kamal Ramzi Stino (ar: كمال رمزي استينو) (July 10, 1910 – 1987) was born in Mansoura, Egypt. His father, Ramzi Beik Stino Hanna was the first Egyptian irrigation engineer to take over supervision duties for the entire Egyptian irrigation system under the British. At that time, Egypt was under British rule. His mother, Afefa Michael Gad, was the daughter of one of the most prominent Coptic landowners in the country. Kamal was the eldest of his five siblings.

Stino earned a Bachelor of Science degree in agriculture from the University of California, Davis, and a Ph.D. from the University of California at Berkeley. His field of study was plant cytogenetics. He worked for the USDA in Bethesda, Maryland, for one year as a post-doctorate internship. When he returned to Egypt, he joined the College of Agriculture, Cairo University, Department of Agronomy. He taught thousands of students that received their bachelor's degree from the College of Agriculture. He also developed a large graduate congregation of his students. More than 120 graduate students received their Master's degree and more than 80 graduate students received their Ph.D.’s under his supervision. He published more than 160 scientific papers in reputable scientific journals. He also wrote 4 textbooks on vegetables. He developed more than 12 new varieties of sweet potato, yams, squash, watermelon, melon and eggplants.

In 1956 Gamal Abdel Nasser, the president of Egypt at the time, chose him to be the only Coptic Christian Minister (Secretary) of supply and trade in the Egyptian cabinet. He held over the course of 14 years. He was also the Deputy Prime Minister for the last 6 years of his appointment. During his career, he developed several systems to help the Egyptian poor. He launched a program to sell food staples to the public at subsidized prices through government-owned stores. These stores are still in operation as of 2020. He also developed a system to offer food ration cards to the poor to ensure that they had enough sustenance.

== National Poultry Company ==
Stino also initiated the development of the National Poultry Company that introduced broilers for the first time in Egypt; the National Meat Company which tried to produce a larger buffalo veal in Egypt and the National Fishery Company that introduced raising fish commercially and that had the first high sea commercial fishing fleet in Egypt. In 1970 he was chosen to head the Center of Agriculture Research. In 1972, he was elected as the first Director General of the Arab Organization of Agriculture Development.

== Family ==
He was married to Lady Farida (Hanem) Shawki Shenouda and had his firstborn son, Farid, with her. When she died due to complications during delivery, he married her sister, Lady Madeline, and had a son, Sherif, and a daughter, Maisie. In addition to being a prominent figure in Egyptian politics himself, Dr Stino's brother Moheb was also appointed as minister of tourism and aviation under President Sadat. His other brother, Charles was vice-minister of industry and trade under Nasser.
