= Roger Camille =

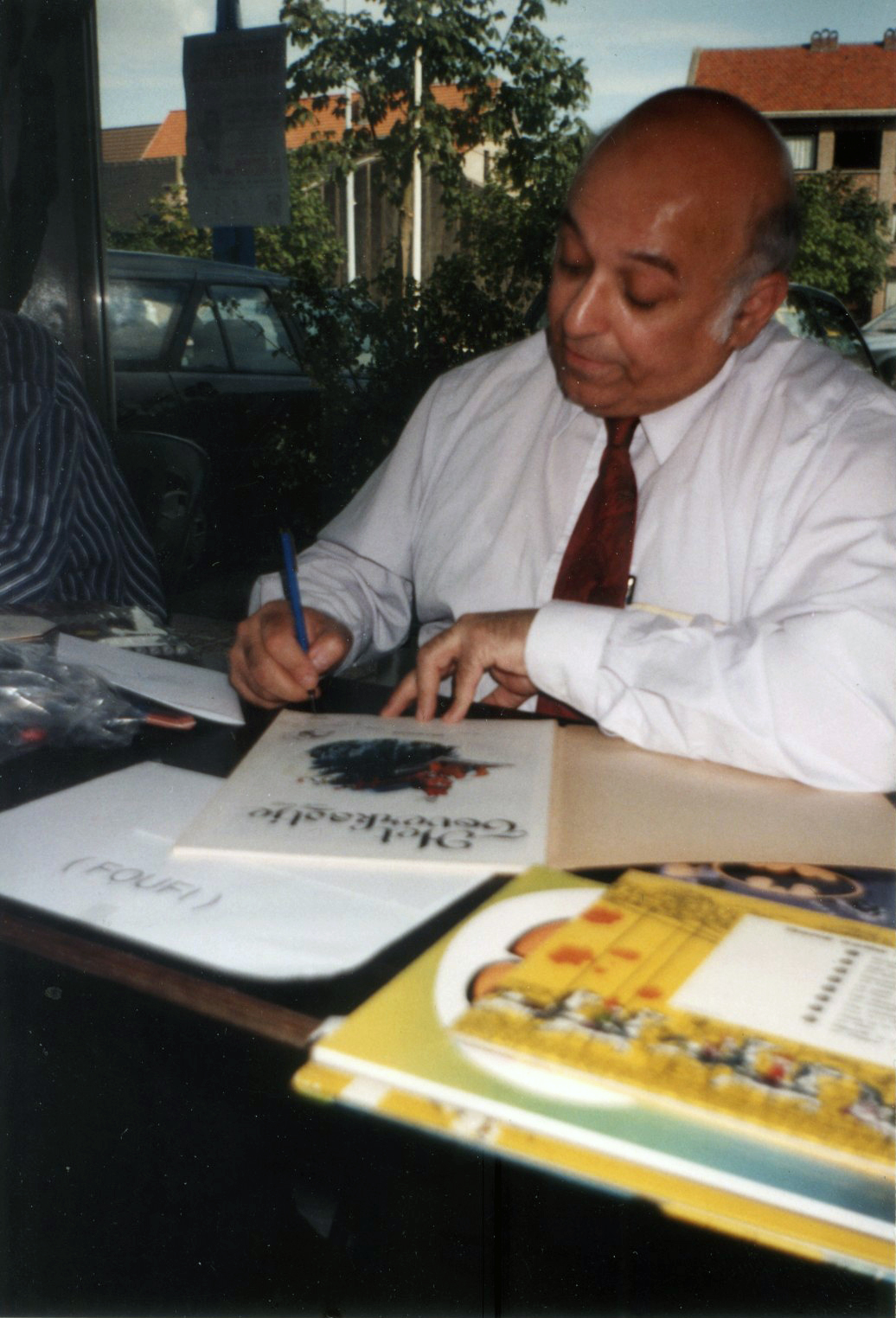
- Camille in 1995
- Born: May 24, 1936 Cairo, Egypt
- Died: May 23, 2006 (aged 69) Brussels
- Area: Cartoonist
- Pseudonym: KiKo
- Notable works: Foufi

Roger Camille alias Kiko (Heliopolis, 24 May 1936 – Brussels, 23 May 2006), was a Belgian cartoonist.

== Biography ==
He was born in Egypt as Roger Kamil and began his career as a cartoonist for Samir, a children's magazine in Egypt, in the late 1950s. He later left that country in the early 1960s after the Nasser regime began suppressing dissidents, living first in Canada (1962–63) and then Belgium, where he started working for Spirou magazine; his first comics for Spirou were Djinn (1964–66), written by Jacques Devos, and Ali-Bibi Le Petit Fakir (1965), written by Lucien de Gieter.

His most famous comic, Foufi, originally was created as a supplemental feature for the weekly Arabic edition of Superman. Foufi chronicles the adventures of the eponymous boy, a Robin Hood figure who wears a red fez and rides his magic carpet to dispense justice; it first was published in Lebanon in 1964, then moved to Spirou starting from 1965. The strip was retired in 1983; three albums of Foufi were published by Dupuis in French and Dutch between 1967 and 1968.

He shifted his focus to commercial art starting in the 1980s, developing several notable advertising campaigns, including the lion mascot Max for the Italian ice cream company Motta.

He lived in Schaerbeek and died on the eve of his 70th birthday.
