= Moheb Stino =

Egyptian politician

Dr. Moheb Ramzi Stino was the Minister of Tourism and Aviation for Egypt under Anwar Sadat. His brother, Dr. Kamal Stino, was Vice-Prime Minister under Nasser. His other brother, Charles Stino, was the vice Minister of Industry, under Nasser.
