= Wassef Hinein =

Wassef Hinein was the only Coptic Christian member of the Egyptian Free Officers group which took power in a military coup against the Egyptian monarchy in 1952. In the period leading up to the coup, Copts were heavily involved in Egypt's nationalist movement, but were underrepresented in the officer corps of the Egyptian military at the time, due to Christians' traditional dhimmi status in Egypt, which meant they could never aspire to high rank. It is for this reason that, other than Hinein, who was recruited very late in the movement, the Free Officers were entirely Muslim.
