= Coptic Church Review =

Religious Quarterly Magazine

Coptic Church Review is a Coptic Orthodox publication; published in the United States and founded in 1980 by Doctor Rodolph Yanney, president of the Society of Coptic Church Studies, in the US. It was originally based in East Brunswick, New Jersey. The magazine is published quarterly and is based in Lebanon, Pennsylvania.
