= Georgette Kellini =

Egyptian politician

Dr. Georgette Sobhi Kellini is an Egyptian politician and human rights activist.

Born in Cairo to a Coptic Christian family, Georgette Kellini holds a doctorate in international trade law. She has served as a Member of the Parliament of Egypt, and is a member of the National Council for Human Rights.

== External references ==
- Bikya Masr
- Arab Parliamentary Conference on The UN Convention Against Corruption
- Annual Report of The National Council for Human Rights
