= Osama Mounir =

Egyptian radio personality and singer

- أسامة منير
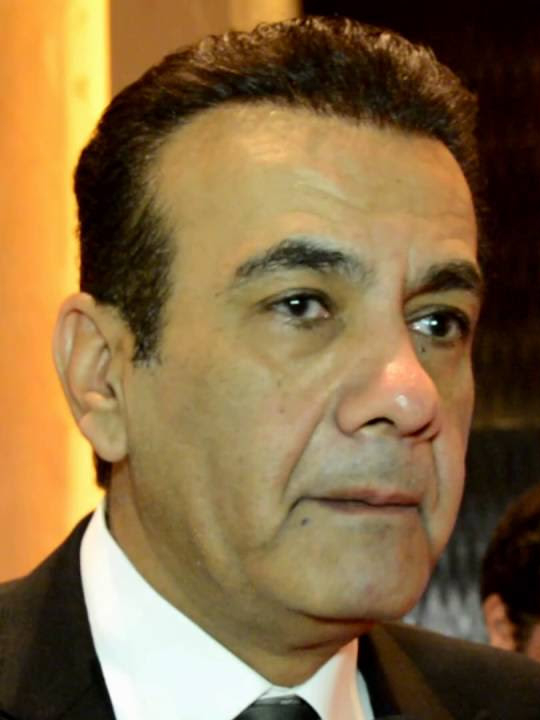
- Mounir in 2016
- Born: February 25, 1970 (age 56)
- Occupation: Radio host
- Website: osamamounir.com

Osama Mounir (Arabic: أسامة منير pronounced [ʔoˈsæːmæ mʊˈniːɾ]; born 25 February 1970) is an Egyptian radio personality and singer, he is current CEO of Express Media groups.

He hosts a radio program on Nogoum FM radio channel called "I, the stars and your love" (Arabic:أنا والنجوم وهواك), which is a program about love problems which has been running for 22 years. Mounir also presented a short-lived TV talk show at NILE LIFE called Kol Lela (every night).

== Early life ==
He graduated from the Faculty of Arts at Ain Shams University, Department of Sociology, and began as a singer and has been singing since he was studying in high school, then he studied Arabic music and traveled to Australia, and after returning to Egypt, he worked for a long time in the field of advertising, then he worked for Nogoom FM radio channel in 2002.

== Discography ==
- Haghanialek
- 3esh 7yatak
- Ana
