= Aziz Suryal Atiya =

Egyptian Coptologist

- عزيز سوريال عطية Ⲁⲍⲓⲍ Ⲥⲟⲩⲣⲓⲁⲗ Ⲁϯⲁ
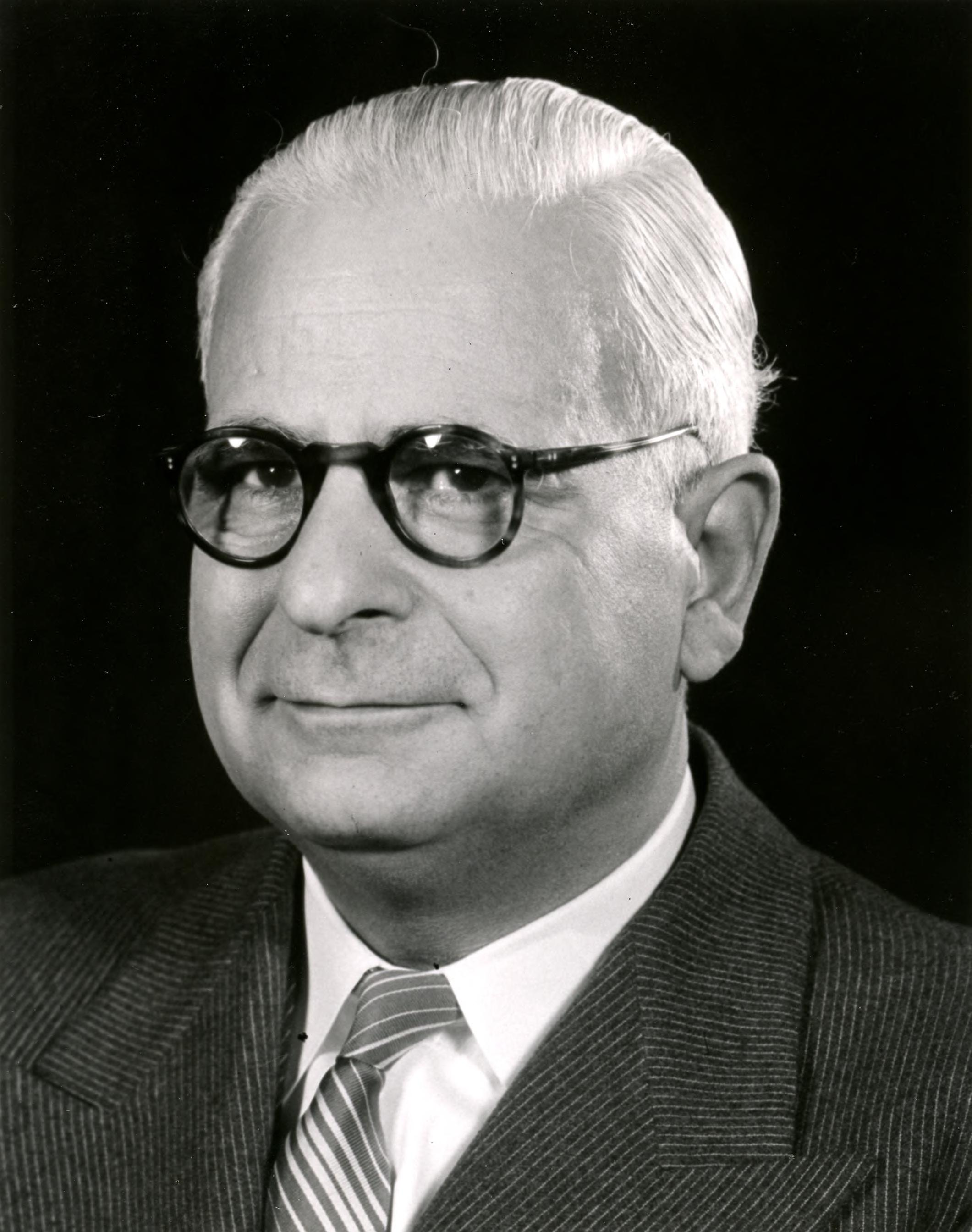
- University of Michigan faculty portrait of Atiya
- Born: July 4, 1898; Zefta, Egypt
- Died: September 24, 1988 (aged 90); Salt Lake City, Utah, U.S.
- Education: University of Liverpool (BA); University of London (PhD)
- Awards: University of Liverpool (DLitt, 1938); Brigham Young University (LLD, 1967)
- Scientific career
- Fields: Coptology
- Workplaces: Cairo University; Alexandria University; Institute of Coptic Studies; Princeton University; University of Utah

Aziz Suryal Atiya (Arabic: عزيز سوريال عطية, Coptic: Ⲁⲍⲓⲍ Ⲥⲟⲩⲣⲓⲁⲗ Ⲁϯⲁ; July 5, 1898 – September 24, 1988) was an Egyptian Coptologist who was a Coptic historian and scholar and an expert in Islamic and Crusades studies.

Atiya was the founder of the Institute of Coptic Studies in Cairo in the 1950s, and was also the founder of the Middle East Center, University of Utah.

His library, the Aziz Atiya Library for Middle East Studies at University of Utah, is considered the fifth largest of such collection in North America.

While at the University of Utah, Professor Atiya rediscovered ten lost papyri fragments related to the Mormon scripture, Book of Abraham, in the archives of the New York Metropolitan Museum of Art.

== Early life and education ==
Atiya was born in Egypt on July 4, 1898, and was a Coptic Christian. He matriculated at the University of Liverpool, where he earned a bachelor's degree with first-class honors in medieval and modern history, and obtained a PhD in Arabic and Islamic studies from the University of London. He was also Egypt's first Fulbright scholar.

== Work ==
Atiya published a large study entitled The Crusades in the Later Middle Ages in 1938, and was also the first author of The Coptic Encyclopedia, published in 1991.

The chapters on the Copts in his book The History of Eastern Christianity (1968, 1980) have become landmarks, not only for specialists but also for the general public.

It was Atiya who had the words Coptology and Coptologist introduced into the English language.

He could speak English, Arabic, French, German, Italian, Latin, and to a lesser extent, Spanish, Greek, Coptic, Turkish, Welsh, and Dutch.

== Academic career ==
- Honorary Professor of Medieval (including Oriental) History for Kahle's Orientalisches Seminar in Bonn, Germany 1935–1939
- Professor of Medieval History at Cairo University 1939–1942.
- Vice-Dean of the Faculty of Arts (1949–1950) and Chairman of the History Department at Alexandria University 1952–1954.
- Medieval Academy Visiting Professor of Arabic Studies at University of Michigan.
- Positions at the Union Theological Seminary and Columbia University.
- Patten Visiting Professor and Lecturer at Indiana University 1957
- Professor of Arabic and Islamic History at Princeton University (1957–1958).
- Professor of Languages and History at University of Utah 1959.

== Awards ==
- Awarded a Doctor of Letters from the University of Liverpool 1938.
- Granted the honorary degree of Doctor of Humane Letters and honorary Doctor of Laws (LL.D.), Brigham Young University United States 1967.

== Publications ==
- The Arabic Manuscripts of Mount Sinai: A Hand-list of the Arabic Manuscripts and Scrolls Microfilmed at the Library of the Monastery of St. Catherine (1955). ASIN B0006AU4NM.
- The Coptic Encyclopedia, vol. 1 (1991).
- The Copts and Christian Civilization (1979). ISBN 978-0-87480-145-3.
- Crusade, Commerce and Culture (1962). ISBN ASIN B0000CLOTM.
- The Crusade (1977). ISBN 978-0-8371-8364-0.
- The Crusade: Historiography and Bibliography (1962). ASIN B0000CLOU1.
- The Crusade in the Later Middle Ages (1938).
- The Crusade of Nicopolis (1934).
- The Crusade (1962). ISBN 978-0-19-690008-7.
- Egypt and Aragon: Embassies and Diplomatic Correspondence Between 1300 and 1330 A.D. (1966). ASIN B0007J1LYI.
- A Fourteenth Century Encyclopedist from Alexandria (1977). ASIN B0006XYA4I. About Muḥammad ibn al-Ḳāsim al-Nuwayrī al-Iskandarānī, whose three-volume history of Alexandria Atiya edited and published in six volumes.
- A History of Eastern Christianity (1980). ISBN 978-0-527-03703-1. This is an expanded edition of the first edition published in 1968. ASIN B000IOZ7AG.
- The Monastery of St Catherine and the Mount Sinai Expedition (1952). ASIN B0007EBOK4.
- Atiya published approximately twenty books, many of which are multi-volume projects also journal articles, book chapters, and encyclopedia articles, including authoring or co-authoring dozens in the monumental Coptic Encyclopedia.

== See also ==
- Coptic history
- Coptic Orthodox Church of Alexandria
- List of Copts
- Lists of Egyptians
- Institute of Coptic Studies
- Coptology
