= Nader Anise =

American lawyer and marketer

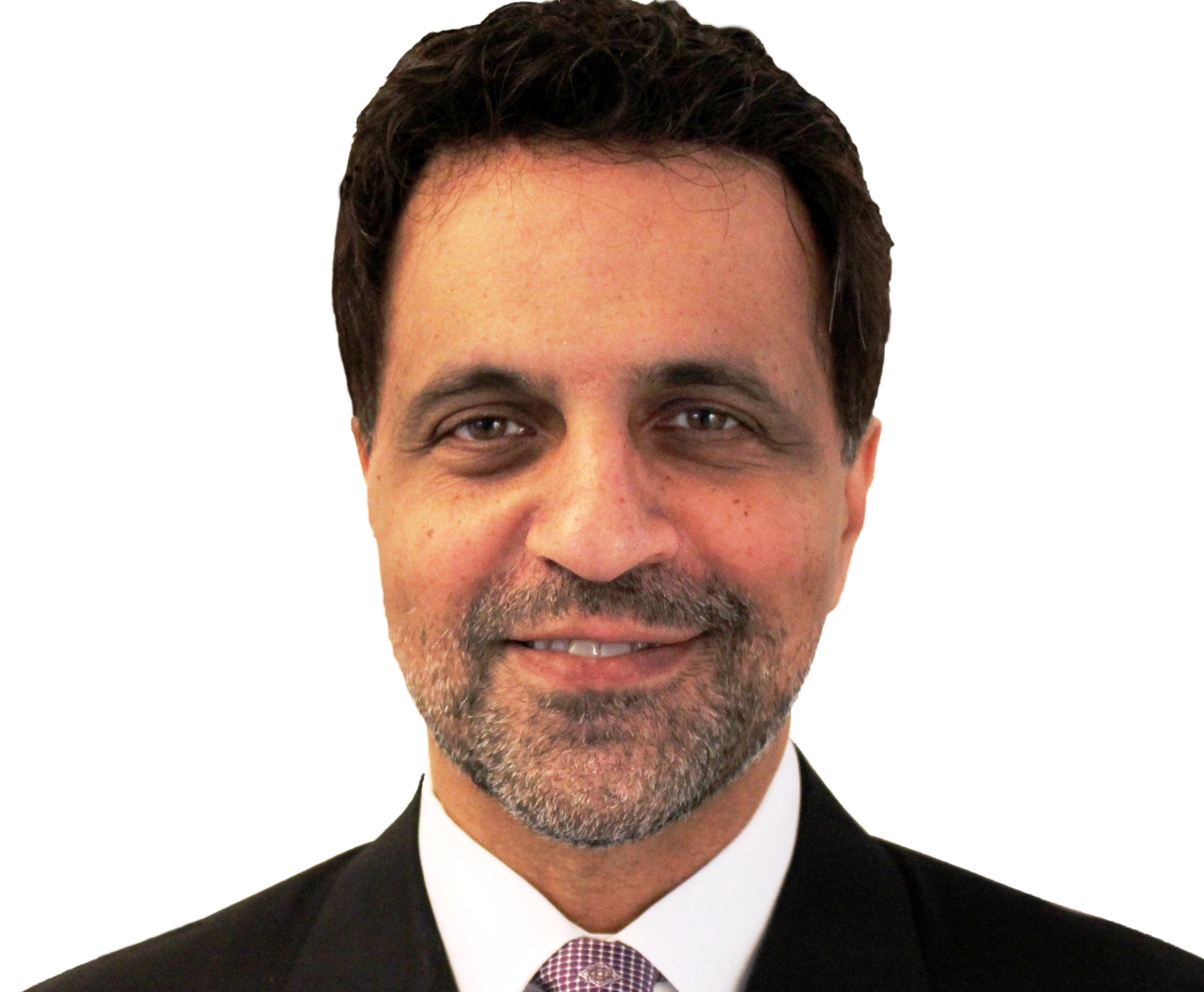
- Education: Shepard Broad Law Center at Nova Southeastern University
- Occupations: Lawyer, Marketer
- Years active: 1995-present
- Website: www.copticchamber.com

Nader Anise is an American lawyer and marketer based in Florida, known best as the founder and CEO of Nader Anise Lawyer Marketing. He is the founder of the American Lawyers Public Image Association where he currently serves as national director. Anise is a former adjunct professor at Nova Southeastern University where he taught law and marketing. Anise is the founder of Love Your Lawyer Day, an unofficial holiday promoting "no lawyer bashing."

== Early life and education ==
Anise was born in Cairo, Egypt and came to the United States when he was two and a half, growing up in New Jersey. He grew up in New Jersey and attended Monmouth University prior to going into law. Anise pursued a career in law, despite having a background in sales, marketing, and real estate. He attended Shepard Broad Law Center at Nova Southeastern University in Florida, graduating and passing the Florida Bar exam in 1995.

== Career ==
Anise began his career in law in 1995 when he started the Anise Law Firm, focusing on business law and international business transactions. Four and a half years later, he moved into marketing and consulting. He focused on solo practitioners, small firms and medium firms who do not have their own marketing departments. He began Nader Anise Lawyer Marketing in 1999. He has since been a marketing strategist to law firms and businesses, giving presentations to large groups throughout the United States.

Anise is the founder of the American Lawyers Public Image Association (ALPIA), an organization with a goal of promoting a positive image for lawyers. He serves as the organization's national director. Anise and the Association made news in 2001 after they publicly denounced NBC-TV's First Years, a television show that documented the life of first-year lawyers. The show was later cancelled after the first season. Anise founded I Love My Lawyer Day, a day of "no lawyer bashing" and lawyer appreciation that takes place on the 1st Friday of November each year. He established the day after hearing too many negative comments about lawyers.

In addition to his marketing business, Anise is a former adjunct professor of both law and marketing, teaching at Nova Southeastern University's H. Wayne Huizenga School of Business and Entrepreneurship. He is also credited with coining the term lawyerpreneur.
