= Makary Younan =

Coptic Orthodox priest (1934–2022)

Father Makary Younan
- أبونا القس مكاري يونان
- Born: Sabry Younan Abd El-Malek; 1 March 1934; El Maragha, Sohag Governorate, Egypt
- Died: 11 January 2022 (aged 87)
- Years active: 1976–2022
- Website: https://www.fathermakary.net/

Father Makary Younan (Arabic: أبونا مكاري يونان) born Sabry Younan Abd El-Malek (Arabic: صبري يونان عبد الملك); 1 March 1934 – 11 January 2022) was a prominent Coptic Orthodox priest. Known for his exorcisms, powerful preaching, prayer and geniality, he was widely venerated among Christians, attracting a wide population to his Friday meetings, held at the Saint Mark's Coptic Orthodox Cathedral in Azbakeya, Cairo, the Seat of the Coptic Orthodox Pope until 1971.

== Early life ==
Sabry Younan Abd El-Malek was born in Sohag, Egypt, on 1 March 1934. After earning a Bachelor of Science in 1957, Sabry went on to earn a second bachelor's degree from the Coptic Orthodox Theological Seminary (colloquially known as the "Clerical College" in Egypt) in 1974. Sabry was ordained a presbyter by the late Metropolitan Mikhail of Assiut on July 18, 1976, and given the name "Makary", which he kept until his death. Up until his ordination, he had worked for the Egyptian government for 19 years, where he resigned his position in 1976 in order to fully take on the duties of becoming a priest. Younan had only served a few weeks in Assiut after his ordination, and was later relocated to the Saint Mark's Coptic Orthodox Cathedral in Azbakeya, Cairo, which became the primary church that he served in for 44 years.

== Evangelism and service ==
Father Makary was widely known for his weekly televised meetings, which was unique in its attraction of both Christians and Muslims. In Egypt, most church meetings are offered and advertised solely to those members of the host church, with Muslims rarely in attendance. Meetings consisted of hymns chanted by the church's choir, followed by a sermon and short Bible study, question-and-answer session, proclamations of miracles and other works of healing done through the blessing of the meeting, then general prayer. The focal point of many, if not all of Father Makary's weekly meetings was repentance, interspersed with love and a life of holiness through a close relationship with Jesus Christ.

The general prayer phase of the meetings garnered the most attention, as Younan had gifts for healing and exorcism by means of Holy Water. Parishioners and other attendees were likewise encouraged to bring their own water bottles to the meetings for them to be prayed over, and at-home audiences would commonly leave water bottles in front of or near their televisions for prayer. Younan worked diligently to dispel attention away from himself and redirect it towards Christ, as many would naturally try to give him credit as a miracle-worker.

Father Makary was not a stranger to criticism and disdain, both from inside the Coptic Church and from the general population. He faced charges of religious disdain in 2017 after making remarks on Islam on live TV. The remarks were misconstrued and the charges were later dropped.

== Death ==
During the COVID-19 pandemic in Egypt, Father Makary and his wife had both contracted COVID-19 in late December 2021, and were subsequently hospitalized. Younan's wife preceded him in death on 7 January 2022, and Younan passed shortly thereafter on 11 January 2022, at the age of 87.

His funeral was presided over by Bishop Raphael, General Bishop of Cairo, and held the day after he died in the same church he had served in for many years.
