= Akhnoukh Fanous =

Egyptian politician

- أخنخ فانوس
- Born: 1856
- Died: 1946 (aged 89–90)
- Education: Honorary PhD in Law, American University of Beirut (1901)
- Occupations: Political activist; founder
- Known for: Founding the Egyptian Party (1908); organizing the Coptic Conference (1911) in Assiut
- Children: Ester Fanous

Akhnoukh Fanous (Arabic: اخنوخ فانوس; 1856–1946) was a prominent Egyptian political figure of the early twentieth century. Fanous is best known for founding the Egyptian Party in 1908, which consisted mainly of wealthy Copts, who were "Egyptians of Christian faith". He also funded and organized the Coptic Conference in 1911, held in Assiut, which advocated Coptic rights.

== Life and career ==
Fanous was the leader of the Coptic-led Independent Egyptian Party, and played an important role in the "Coptic Congress," which was held 6–8 March 1911. This Congress convened under enormous controversy, and in assuming his role as the leader, Akhnoukh Fanous came under much scrutiny from the public and the government.

The declared purpose of this meeting was the "forging of stronger ties among all Egyptians through the safeguarding of the legitimate rights of Copts." This was following a recent rise in Muslim-Christian tensions, made worse by the assassination of the Coptic Prime Minister of Egypt, Butros Ghali, in 1910. The lack of unity within the Coptic community following these events caused leaders of the Coptic community to call a congress.

Leadership was worried about having Fanous, a known extremist who had written inflammatory articles in the "Misr" and "al-Watan" newspapers, speak at this event during such a pivotal time in Egyptian Muslim-Christian relations. However, he showed "remarkable restraint" in his speech.

In 1901, Akhnoukh Fanous received an honorary PhD in law from the American University of Beirut. He was also one of the founders of the Egyptian University in 1908. Akhnoukh Fanous is the father of the famous political activist Ester Fanous.
