= Ernest Newlandsmith =

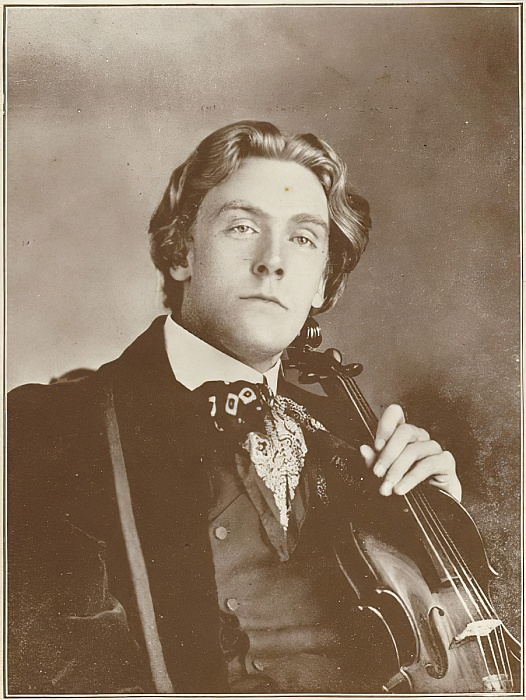
Ernest Newlandsmith

George Ernest Newlandsmith (born Newland Smith; 1875–1958), was a British musicologist with strong Christian belief who formed the Laresol Society to promote artistic vocation of a religious nature. Together with Dr. Ragheb Muftah he was instrumental in noting down and audio recording traditional Coptic church music in the years 1927 to 1936.

Newlandsmith was born in Greenwich, Kent, the son of Rev. James Newland Smith and Emma Errington Smithers. William Collier Smithers was his grandfather.

== The Laresol Society ==
Ernest Newlandsmith founded the society in 1906 "to promote the higher realisation of the artistic vocation, looking at the matter from the standpoint of the religious life, and the definitely directed love and service of God and humanity". In 1908, financed by some two hundred followers he rented a farm near Kirdford in West Sussex called Brownings, but renamed "Kirdford Priory", where a chapel had recently been constructed for use by another fringe Christian sect. This was used for quiet religious retreats. In 1910 Brownings was no longer available and a mission hall was established in north Devon, attracting considerable crowds. By 1911 however Newlandsmith had moved on to Felpham near Bognor Regis, putting on concerts, a mystery play and lectures, with the stress of work leading to ill health in 1912. In 1914 another base was established at Seaford Priory near Newhaven in East Sussex. The beginning of the First World War caused 30,000 soldiers to be camped nearby, spoiling the tranquility and causing Newlandsmith to abandon Seaford. In 1917 he was working in conjunction with the Anglican National Mission in the Portsmouth area where he formed a ladies' Angelus Choir. After the war he preached in London and the Midlands, including Birmingham Cathedral. He expressed astonishment when his concerts and orations failed to spark a national religious revival.

== Friar ==
In 1908 Newlandsmith took vows as a friar and henceforth dressed in a friar's cassock

== The Holy Land ==
In 1926, Brother Ernest, as he was known, took a new course when he travelled to the Middle East. On his way back from Palestine he visited Egypt where he soon became interested in the music of the Coptic Orthodox Church. He met Dr Raghib Muftah, a young agricultural engineer who shared his musical interest and wished to learn western musical notation to record the oral Coptic tradition. Living on Muftah's houseboat on the River Nile in front of El-Dobara palace, Newlandsmith, sitting crosslegged on the floor, notated the music performed by singers while Muftah recording them using paper tape recording equipment brought by Newlandsmith from England. They soon decided to work exclusively with the blind cantor Mualim Mikhail Girgis El Batanouny, and through nine winters until 1936 they compiled sixteen volumes of music which are now in the United States Library of Congress. In 1931 Newlandsmith gave a series of lectures at Oxford and Cambridge universities and in London. He claimed that when what he called the "appalling debris of Arabic ornamentation" was stripped away the music was not Turkish, Arab or Greek, but ancient Egyptian music handed down by oral tradition from the temples of pharaonic Egypt.

He died in 1958. He was paralyzed the last eight years of his life. He was survived by his wife, Maria Romero, whom he married in 1940.

== Literary works ==
Published works include;

- The Temple of Love. London The Laresol Society 1906 (very rare).
- Art Ideals. 1906.
- The Temple of Life. 1910.
- The Vision of the Holy Grail, one in a series of "Pastoral Mystery Plays". ca. 1910-1912
- In Light and Shade. Poems. With a portrait. by Helen Coulthard and Ernest Newlandsmith 1913.
- England's Greatest Need. 1916.
- Religion and the Arts. 1918.
- The Temple of Art. A Plea for the Higher Realisation of the Artistic Vocation. London: Longmans, Green & Co, 1919.
- The New Humanity- a Study of the World, the Church, the Gospel and the Mysteries. 1925.
- Interior Prayer (Little Books on Religion. no. 35.) 1925.
- The Ministry of Music. 1925.
- The World, the Flesh and the Devil. With particular reference to the stage. 1926.
- Three Blessed Beasts. A book for babes, etc. 1926.
- The Man of God. A study in Christology and the mysteries of the spiritual life. 1926.
- A Minstrel Friar: The Story of My Life and Work. 1927.
- The New Life. 1928.
- The Ancient Music of the Coptic Church. A lecture, etc. 1931.
- Christ or Chaos? message from Mount Carmel. 1931.
- A musician's pilgrimage: The story of my life, work and philosophy. 1932.
- My Message. (SI) The New Life Movement 1941.
- Art, Love and Life. London: Longmans, Green 1944.
- The New Reformation. 1946.
- The Awakening of Christendom. 1948.
- Modern Babylon and the way out. New Life Publishing House (1952)
- The Temple of Life: An Outline of the True Mission of Art Re-published 2007 ISBN 0-548-21607-X ISBN 978-0548216071

== Published music ==
- Ballade. Romance in D for Violin and Piano. Houghton & Co (1898)
- Nocturne pour Instruments aÌ. Schott & Co (1900)
- Polonaise-Caprice in G for Violin and Piano. Schott & Co.
- Rêverie for Violin and Piano. Schott & Co.
- Idylle for Violin and Piano. Schott & Co.
- Oriental Suite for violin and piano (1931)
- Carmelite Rhapsody (1931)
- Bibliography of his early music compositions, see: Universal Handbuch der Musikliteratur aller Zeiten und Völker. (Vienna, n.d.) Vol.1, Pt. 1, P.124.
