= Ester Fanous =

Egyptian feminist (1895–1990)

Ester Akhnoukh Fanous
- إستر فانوس
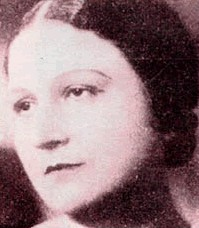
- Ester Fanous
- Born: February 19, 1895; Assiut, Egypt
- Died: August 1990 possibly Alexandria, Egypt
- Other names: Ester Wissa
- Occupations: Feminist; political activist
- Known for: Founding member of the New Woman Society; Women's Wafd Central Committee (1920); Egyptian Feminist Union (1923)
- Spouse: Fahmy Bey Wissa (m. 24 July 1913)
- Children: Gamil, Adli, Firdous ("Doussa")
- Parent(s): Akhnoukh Fanous (father); Balsam Wissa (mother)

Ester Akhnoukh Fanous or Esther Fanous (Arabic: إستر فانوس), also known as Ester Wissa (February 19, 1895, Assiut, Egypt – August 1990) was an Egyptian feminist. She was a founding member of the New Woman Society and helped found the Women's Wafd Central Committee in 1920. Her son Hanna Fahmy Wissa has written about her in his family memoir Assiout.

== Life ==
Esther Fahmy Wissa was the daughter of doctor Akhnoukh Fanous and Balsam Wissa, from a prominent Coptic Christian family. The national and religious atmosphere dominating her parents' house had a great influence on her personality; she accordingly knew the freedom through the ideas and opinions raised within her family and through the valuable books existing in her father's library. When the famous lawyer, Makram Ebeid, a friend of their family visited her house, Ester Fanous learned that Saad Zaghloul Pasha intended with some friends to travel to England demanding to lift British mandate on Egypt. She then decided to revolt against British colonialism in early 1919.

Feeling grief when the demonstrations overwhelmed Egypt and the British shot the demonstrators, Ester wrote to President Wilson of the United States, saying: "Four persons were sent to fight in this battle" (she means Saad Zaghloul and his friends), "if it is urgent we will send 4 hundreds may be 4 thousands or 4 millions to liberate the 4 precedents. Triple of this number insists to establish justice in our homeland. Elders regain their strength, men are valiant and women are virile".

Ester traveled to Cairo to meet with Safia Zaghloul who proposed the signature of three women on the message dedicated to President Wilson. Hundred women were gathered to sign this message and submit their objections; then they went in a feminist demonstration raising their flags and chanting slogans.

Together with Hoda Shaarawi, Ester Fanous decided to establish a committee representing the women of Egypt acting jointly with the delegation. In St Mark Church, the women held a meeting where Hoda Shaarawi was nominated chair and Fekria Hosny, Ehsan Al-Qoussy and Ester Fanous were nominated as secretaries. They subsequently held a political meeting in a mosque where they delivered their speeches for the first time with men.

In March 1923, Ester Fanous established with other women the Egyptian Feminist Union to improve women's level in literature and social aspect and to promote them to be treated on equal footing with men in rights and obligations. She was involved in other associations such as the Young Women's Christian Association and the Labour Association of Egypt as well as other charitable associations.

Ester Fanous died in August 1990, leaving a significant influence of national unity and the endeavour to emancipate Egyptian Women.
