= Institute of Coptic Studies =

Research centre of the Coptic Orthodox Church of Alexandria

The Institute of Coptic Studies is a postgraduate academic institute affiliated with the Coptic Orthodox Church of Alexandria. It was founded in Cairo, Egypt, in 1954, and its Grand President is Pope Tawadros II, the Pope of Alexandria and Patriarch of the See of St. Mark.

== History ==
The idea of founding the Institute was initiated by historian and scholar Professor Aziz Suryal Atiya, who also founded the Middle East Center at the University of Utah. Several other prominent Coptic and Egyptology scholars participated in its foundation, including Professor Pahor Labib, who was Director of the Coptic Museum in Old Cairo from 1951 to 1965.

Since its establishment, the Institute has played a key role in developing and preserving Coptic heritage, and has been involved in both academic and cultural efforts related to Coptic theology, history, art, architecture, music, language, archaeology, literature, and African studies. It collaborates with local and international academic institutions, and organizes symposia and conferences on Coptic-related topics.

== Description ==
The Institute is regarded as the Coptic Orthodox Church’s primary research center in the field of Coptology. It offers postgraduate programs and is active in research, restoration, translation, documentation, and publication of materials related to Coptic heritage.

Among the notable artists who studied at the Institute are Isaac Fanous, a pioneer of modern Coptic iconography, and Adel Nassief. Iris Habib Elmasry lectured in Coptic history there from 1955 to 1985. Another renowned instructor was Mikhail Girgis El Batanouny, an expert in Coptic music.

== Departments ==
The Institute is composed of specialized departments, each focusing on a particular aspect of Coptic studies:

- Department of Theology – Former Head: Bishop Bishoy
- Department of Coptic Language – Head: Metropolitan Demetrios of Mallawi, Ansena, and Ashmounin
- Department of African Studies – Head: Prof. Anton Yacoub
- Department of Media Studies – Head: Dr. Rami Atta
- Department of Coptic Architecture – Head: Prof. Sami Sabry
- Department of Archaeology and Restoration – Head: Prof. Adel Fakhry
- Department of Sociology and Education – Head: Prof. Tharwat Isaac
- Department of History – Head: Prof. Anthony Soryal
- Department of Coptic Hymns and Music – Supervised by: Prof. Michel Badi’ Abdel Malek
- Department of Coptic Art – Supervised by: Prof. Sami Sabry
- Department of Eastern Christian Heritage – Supervised by: Prof. Naglaa Hamdy Boutros

== See also ==
- Coptology
- Coptic art
- Coptic Orthodox Church
- List of Coptic saints
- Coptic language
