= Hassan (given name) =

Arabic masculine given name

- Pronunciation: Arabic: [ˈħas saan, ˈħæsæn, ˈħɑsɐn, ˈħɛsæn, ħsæn]
- Gender: Male
- Language: Arabic

Origin
- Meaning: handsome, good, benefactor
- Region of origin: Arabia

Other names
- Variant form: al-Ḥasan
- Related names: Ḥassān; Hussein; Alassane; Lassana; Mohsen

Hassan or Hasan (Ḥasan) is an Arabic masculine given name in the Muslim world.

As a surname, Hassan may be Arabic, Irish, Scottish, or Jewish (Sephardic and Mizrahic) (see Hassan as a surname).

== Etymology and spelling ==
The name Hassan in Arabic means 'handsome' or 'good', or 'benefactor'.

There are two different Arabic names that are both romanized with the spelling "Hassan". However, they are pronounced differently, and in Arabic script spelled differently.

- The more common name حَسَن Ḥasan (as in the name of the Islamic prophet Muhammad's grandson Hasan ibn Ali), coming from the Arabic language triconsonantal root Ḥ-S-N, has two short vowels and a single /s/. Its meaning is 'the good' or 'the handsome'. Its usual form in Classical Arabic is الحسن al-Ḥasan, incorporating the definite article al-, which may be omitted in modern Arabic names.
- The name حَسَّان Ḥassān, which comes from the same Arabic root, has a long vowel and a doubled /sː/. Its meaning is 'doer of good' or 'benefactor'. It is not used with the definite article in Classical Arabic.

In the romanized spelling Hassan, it is not possible to distinguish which of the two names is intended. The ambiguity can be removed by romanizing the former name as Hasan with a single s, and reserving the spelling Hassan with doubled s for the latter name.

King al-Ḥasan of Morocco (officially romanized as Hassan, with a double ss, due to the influence of French orthography) is an example of the former. The early Islamic poet Ḥassān ibn Thābit is an example of the latter. In the original Arabic, the two different names are easily distinguished.

Depending on language and region, spelling variations

Hassan or Hasan is an Arabic given name and through the influence of Arabic, languages spoken by Muslims such as Persian, Kazakh, Kurdish, Urdu, Indonesian, Malay, Turkish, Uyghur, Turkmen, Somali, Swahili, Berber, Azerbaijani, Crimean Tatar, Tatar, Bosnian, Albanian, Bengali, etc. created their own spelling variations.

Therefore, depending on language and region, spelling variations include Hasan, Hassen, Hasson, Hassin, Hassine, Hacen, Hasen, Hesen, Hasin, Hassa, Hess, Cassin, Chazan, Chasson, Chason, Khassan, Khasan, Chessar, Casan, Casen, Hasso, Lassana, Alassane, Lacen, Lasanah, Assan, Asan, or Haasan (Haasaan, Hasaan, Hassaan).

List of variant spellings

- In Arabic transcription: حسن (Hasan), حسان (Hassan)
- In Turkish: Hasan
- In Ottoman Turkish: حسن (Hasan)
- In Tatar: Хәсән (Xäsän / Xəsən)
- In Persian: حسن (Hasan), حسان (Hassan)
- In Bosnian: Hasan or Haso
- In Albanian: Hasan
- In Azerbaijan: Həsən,
- In Kurdish: حەسەن (Hesen), حەسان (Hessan)
- In Kazakh: Қасен (Qasen), Хасен (Hasen or Khassen), Asan or Äsem
- In Somali: Xasan
- In Bengali: হাসান (Hāsān)
- In Sub-Saharan Africa: Lassana, Alassane and Lacen, derived from al-Hassan.
- In French: Hassan, Hassen or Hacen
- In Spanish: Hassan, Hassán, Hacen, Hacén, Jassan, Jassán, Jasan or Jasán
- In Italian: Hassan
- In Russian transcription: Хасан (Hasan), Хассан (Hassan), Хассен (Hassen), Хэссан (Hessan), Гасан (Gasan)
- In Croatian or Serbian or Montenegrin: Aсан (Asan) or Хасан (Hasan)
- In Finnish: Hasan
- In Chinese: 哈桑/哈山 (Hā Sāng/Hā Shān)
- In Korean: 하산 (Hasan)
- In Somali: Hassan (Hassan)

== People ==
=== Hacine ===
- Hacine Cherifi (born 1967), former French boxer

=== Hasan ===
- Hasan I (disambiguation), number of people with the mononym
- Hasan II (disambiguation), number of people with the mononym
- Hasan ibn Ali (625–670), the first grandson of Muhammad, son of Ali ibn Abi Talib, and the second Imam of Shia Islam.
- Hasan al-Mustadi Ibn al-Mustanjid (1142–1180), famously known as al-Mustadi, was the Caliph of the later Abbasid Caliphate from 18 December 1170 to 27 March 1180.
- Abu l-Hasan Ali, Sultan of Granada (died 1485), also known as Muley Hacén in Spanish
- Hasan al-Askari (846–874), eleventh Imam of Twelver Shi‘ism
- al-Ḥasan al-Baṣrī (642–728), early Islamic scholar
- Hasan Çelebi (1937–2025), Turkish calligrapher
- Hasan Čengić (1957–2021), Bosnian former Deputy Prime Minister and Defense Minister
- Hasan Çetinkaya (born 1977), Swedish footballer
- Hasan Corso (died 1556), Italian who was part of the army of janissaries in the Turkish army
- Hasan Doğan (1956–2008), Turkish 37th president of the TFF
- Hasan Gemici (1927–2001), Turkish sports wrestler
- Hasan Farhat (footballer) (born 2004), Lebanese footballer
- Hasan Fehmi Güneş (1934–2021), Turkish politician
- Hasan Güngör (1934–2011), Turkish sports wrestler
- Hasan Hamdan, Lebanese actor and voice actor
- Hasan Irlu (1959–2021), Iranian diplomat
- Hasan Izzet (1871–1931), Ottoman general
- Hasan Kabze (born 1982), Turkish footballer
- Hasan Mahmud (politician) (born 1963), Bangladeshi former Minister of Foreign Affairs who is wanted for crimes
- Hasan Mahmud (cricketer) (born 1999), Bangladeshi cricketer
- Hasan Minhaj (born 1985), American comedian
- Hasan Muratović (1940–2020), former Bosniak rector of the University of Sarajevo and former prime minister
- Hasan Nasbi (born 1979), Indonesian political consultant and Chief of Presidential Communication Office
- Hasan Nazih (1921–2012), Iranian lawyer and politician
- Hasan Piker (born 1991), Turkish-American Twitch streamer and political commentator
- Hasan Polatkan (1915–1961), executed Turkish politician
- Hasan Salihamidžić (born 1977), Bosnian football midfielder
- Hasan Sönmez (born 1976), Turkish footballer
- Hasan Şaş (born 1976), Turkish footballer
- Hasan Şerefli, Turkish filmmaker
- Hasan Ali Yücel (1897–1961), Turkish minister of education
- Mosab Hassan Yousef (nicknamed "The Green Prince"; born 1978), Palestinian who worked undercover for Israel's Shin Bet

=== Hasson ===
- Hasson Arbubakrr (born 1960), a former NFL and CFL player

=== Hassan ===
- Prince Hassan (born 1947), served as Crown Prince of Jordan under King Hussein's reign
- Hassan Engamo (died 1889), leader of Hadiya
- Hassan I of Morocco (1836–1894), alaouite sultan of Morocco
- Hassan II of Morocco (1929–1999), the father of the current King of Morocco
- Hassan Mohammed Abdirahman, real name of Somali singer-songwriter Aar Maanta
- Hassan Adams (born 1984), NBA player
- Hassan Abdillahi, Somali journalist and activist
- Hassan Akhavi (1908–1997), Iranian army general and politician
- Hassan Al Alfi (1936–2021), Egyptian politician
- Hassan Assad (born 1973), converted name of professional wrestler Montel Vontavious Porter
- Hassan Bahara (born 1978), Moroccan-Dutch writer
- Hassan al-Banna (1906–1949), founder of the Muslim Brotherhood
- Hassan Abu Basha (1922–2005), Egyptian army general and politician
- Hassan Bey Shukri (1876–1940), mayor of Haifa
- Hassan Bitar (born 1985), Lebanese footballer
- Hassan Booker (born 1975), American basketball player and coach
- Hassan Brijany (1961–2020), Swedish actor
- Hassan "Moni" Chaito (born 1989), Lebanese footballer
- Hassan "Shibriko" Chaito (born 1991), Lebanese footballer
- Hassan Abshir Farah (1945–2020), former Prime Minister of Somalia
- Hassan Hall (born 2000), American football player
- Hassan Haskins (born 1999), American football player
- Hassan Heshmat (1920–2006), Egyptian sculptor
- Hassan Ibrahim (1917–1990), Egyptian military officer and politician
- Hassan Izz-Al-Din (born 1963) Lebanese terrorist
- Hassan Johnson, American actor
- Hassan Jones (born 1964), former professional American football player
- Hassan Khan (politician) (1936–2024), Indian politician
- Hassan Chande Kigwalilo, Tanzanian politician
- Hassan Maatouk (born 1987), Lebanese footballer
- Hassan Mezher (born 1981), Lebanese footballer
- Hassan Mohamed (born 1991), Qatari basketball player
- Hassan Nader (born 1965), retired Moroccan footballer
- Hassan Nasrallah (1960–2024), leader of Hezbollah (1970–2024)
- Hassan Oumari (born 1986), Lebanese footballer
- Hassan Al-Qazwini (born 1964), Islamic Center Imam
- Hassan Rajab Khatib (born 1946), Tanzanian politician
- Hassan Roshdieh (1851–1944), Iranian teacher, politician, and journalist
- Hassan Rowshan (born 1955), Iranian coach, manager, and former player
- Hassan-i Sabbah (1050–1124), founder of the Hashshashin, "Assassins"
- Hassan Shamsid-Deen (born 1976), American football player
- Hassan Sheikh Mohamud (born 1955), President of Somalia
- Hassan Ali Saad (born 1992), simply known as Soony Saad, Lebanese-American footballer
- Hassan Kamel Al-Sabbah (1894–1935), a Lebanese electrical and electronics research engineer
- Hassan Tuhami (1924–2009), Egyptian politician
- Hassan Whiteside (born 1989), American basketball player, NBA player
- Hassan Younes (born 1943), Egyptian engineer and politician
- Hassan Kabande Laija (born 1999), known as Peso Pluma, Mexican singer

=== Middle name ===
- Muse Hassan Sheikh Sayid Abdulle (born 1940), Somali politician and former army General
- Salah-Hassan Hanifes (1913–2002), a Druze Israeli politician who served as a member of the Knesset

=== Hassane ===
- Hassane Alla (born 1980), Moroccan footballer
- Hassane Azzoun (born 1979), Algerian judoka
- Hassane Brahim (born 1989), Chadian footballer
- Hassane Dicko, Burkina Faso politician
- Hassane Hamadi (born 1961), Comorian politician
- Hassane Kamara (born 1994), Gambian footballer

=== Middle name ===
- Ibrahim Hassane Mayaki (born 1951), Niger politician and Prime Minister
- Said Hassane Said Hachim (1932–2020), Comorian politician

=== Hasaan ===
- Hasaan Ibn Ali (1931–1980), American jazz pianist and composer, born William Henry Langford Jr.

=== Hassanal ===
- Hassanal Bolkiah (born 1946), the 29th Sultan and Yang Di-Pertuan of Brunei

=== Hassen ===
- Hassen Bejaoui (born 1975), Tunisian soccer player
- Hassen Gabsi (born 1974), a Tunisian soccer player

=== Khasan ===
- Khasan Bakayev (1959–2025), Russian historian
- Khasan Baroyev (born 1982), Russian wrestler of Ossetian origin
- Khasan Dzhunidov (born 1991), Russian footballer
- Khasan Isaev (born 1952), Bulgarian freestyle wrestler
- Khasan Israilov (1910–1944), Soviet Chechen journalist and poet
- Khasan Mamtov (born 1984), Russian footballer
- Khasan Yandiyev (1948–2008), Russian judge

=== Khassan ===
- Khassan Baiev (born 1963), Chechen-American trauma surgeon

== Fictional characters ==
- Ĥassan, character in the film A Girl Named Maĥmood
- Hassan, from Warner Bros. Merrie Melodies short featuring Bugs Bunny and Daffy Duck, Ali Baba Bunny
- Hassan (C&C), General Hassan in the Command and Conquer continuity
- Hassan, a character from the Pakistani drama serial Dastaan
- Hassan, son of the fictional Indian R&AW agent Tiger in the YRF Spy Universe, portrayed by Jineet Rath and Vishal Jethwa
- Hassan Mostafa, referee at the Quidditch World Cup in Harry Potter and the Goblet of Fire
- Hasan-i Sabbah, a character in the Fate universe

== See also ==
- Abulhasan
- Alassane
- Hassan (surname)
- Hasanuddin
- Hasanuzzaman (disambiguation)
- Hussein
- Lassana
