= Bakayev =

Bakayev or Bakaev is a surname. Notable people with the surname include:

- Albert Bakaev (1964–2009), Russian paralympic swimmer
- Eduard Bakayev (born 1978), Russian football player
- Khasan Bakayev (1959–2025), Chechen historian
- Mikhail Bakayev (born 1987), Russian football player
- Ulugbek Bakayev (born 1978), Uzbekistan football player
- Zelimkhan Bakayev (born 1996), Russian football player
- Zelim Bakaev (born 1992), Russian singer of Chechen origin. Disappeared in 2017.
