= Lassana =

Lassana is a given name or surname that is an alternative transliteration of Al-Hassan, and may refer to:

- Lassana Bathily (born 1990), hero of the Porte de Vincennes hostage crisis
- Lassana Camará (born 1991), Bissau-Guinean footballer
- Lassana Cassamá, Bissau-Guinean football manager
- Lassana Cisse (died 2019), murder victim
- Lassana Coulibaly (born 1996), Malian footballer
- Lassana Coulibaly (criminal), French serial rapist
- Lassana Diakhaby (born 1996), Mauritanian footballer
- Lassana Diallo (born 1984), Malian footballer
- Lassana Diarra (born 1985), French footballer
- Lassana Diarra (Malian footballer) (born 1989)
- Lassana Dias (born 1979), Sri Lankan cricketer
- Lassana Doucouré (born 1988), French footballer
- Lassana Fané (born 1987), Malian footballer
- Lassana Faye (born 1998), Dutch footballer
- Lassana N'Diaye (born 2000), Malian footballer
- Lassana Palenfo (born 1941), Ivorian military general and sports administrator
- Lassana Perera (born 1984), Sri Lankan cricketer
- Lassana Samaké (born 1992), Malian footballer
- Lassana Touré (born 1980), French basketball player
- Lassana Traoré (born 1945), Malian politician and diplomat

== See also ==
- Alassane
