= Hasanuddin =

Hasan Uddin (Arabic: حسن الدين) is an Arabic phrase meaning "Benefactor of the religion". it may refer to:

== People ==
- Maulana Hasanuddin (1478–1570), Sultan of Banten
- Hasanuddin Tumenanga Ri Balla Pangkana (1630–1670), Sultan of Gowa
- Hasan Uddin Sarkar (born 1947), Bangladeshi politician
- Hasanuddin Murad (1957–2023), Indonesian politician
- Hasanuddin Mohd Yunus (born 1964), Malaysian politician

== Other ==
- Hasanuddin University, Indonesia
- Sultan Hasanuddin International Airport, Indonesia
