= Lassana Coulibaly (criminal) =

French serial rapist

Lassana Coulibaly, also known as The Sock Rapist, is a French serial rapist, active between 2002 and 2005 in the areas of Paris, Aulnay-sous-Bois, Clermont-Ferrand, Vichy and Montpellier.

== Crimes and investigation ==
Lassana Coulibaly, a delinquent from Aubervilliers, kidnapped and raped (or sexually assaulted) twelve women between the ages of 19 and 57, entering their homes mainly through an open window, sometimes through a roof, balcony or scaffolding. He got his nickname from the fact that he usually gagged his victims with a sock, also using cables and cord extensions found on site. The absence of fingerprints in the first cases suggested to the investigators that he always wore gloves when he attacked the women; it would eventually turn out that he used a pair of socks to cover his hands.

== Trial and imprisonment ==
On May 23, 2008, Lassana Coulibaly was sentenced to 20 years imprisonment for rape, attempted rape and sexual assault, as the court did not uphold torture and barbarity. After release, he would be put under socio-judicial services at least until he reaches the age of 60.

== Press articles ==
- "Sock rapist tried for sexually assaulting nine women" Article published on May 13, 2008 in La Dépêche du Midi.
- "The 'Sock Rapist' had sexually assaulted twelve victims" Article by Geneviève Colonna d'Istria published on May 15, 2008 in Le Parisien.
- "The trial of the 'Sock Rapist' is held in Riom" Article published on May 15, 2008 in Le Nouvel observateur.

== Documentaries ==
- "The rapist of Clermont-Ferrand" (third report) in "...Clermont-Ferrand", published on May 3, 2014 on NRJ 12.
- "Lassana Coulibaly, the Sock Rapist", March 12, 2017 in "Enter the Accused", presented by Frédérique Lantieri on France 2.

== See also ==
- Patrick Trémeau
