= Hassan Heshmat =

Egyptian sculptor (1920–2006)

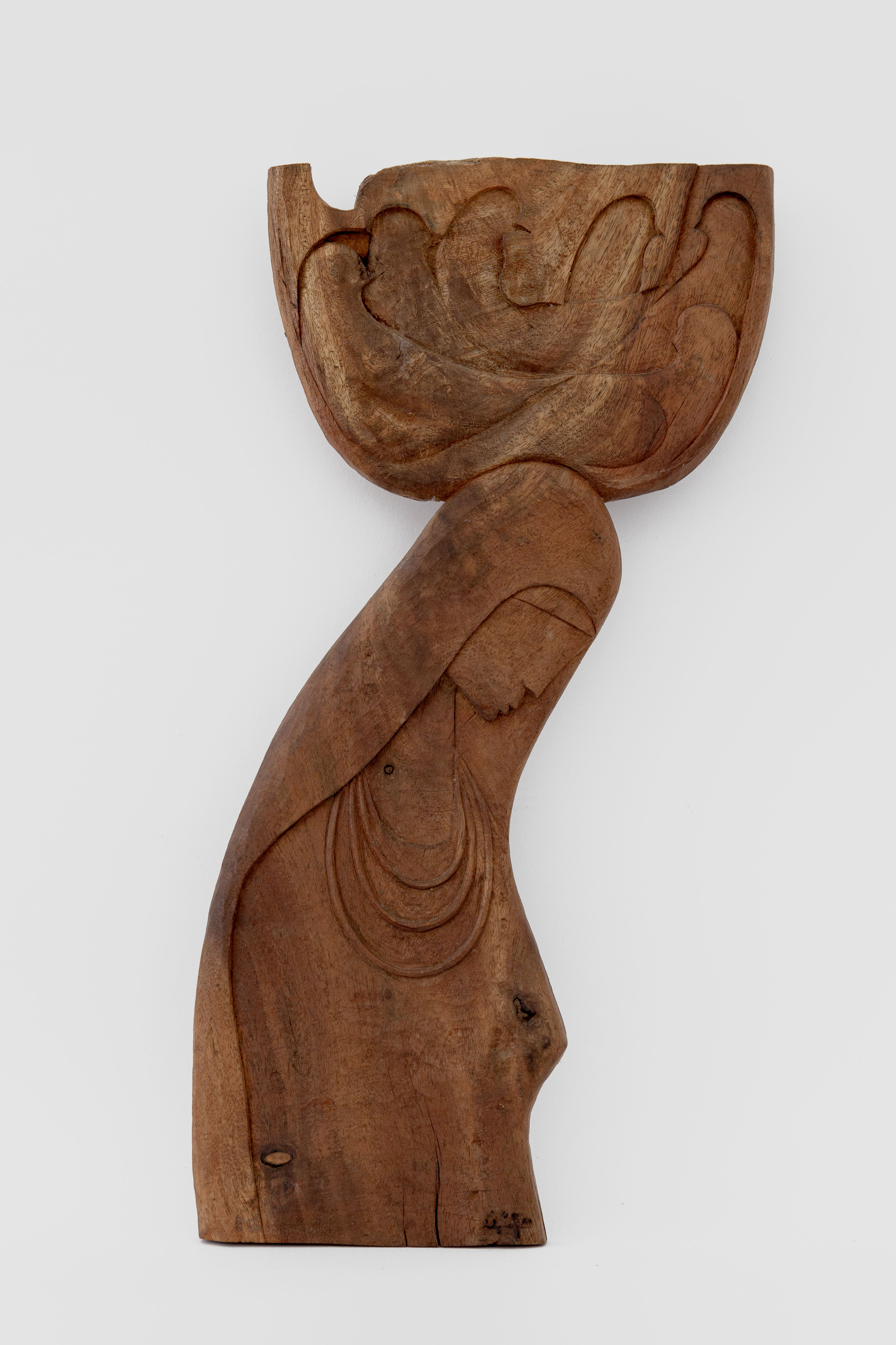
Wood Carving by Hassan Heshmat. Hegasy Collection. Foto ©CDimitriadis

Hassan Heshmat (January 20, 1920 – July 2006) was a celebrated Egyptian sculptor, and is considered a pioneer of modern Egyptian art. Born January 20, 1920, in Menoufia, Egypt, Heshmat earned his diploma in Applied Arts, specialising in ceramics (1938), followed by a diploma from the Higher Institute of Technical Education for Teachers (1954). In 1957, he was granted a scholarship to study Porcelain Design in Selb, Bavaria, graduating in 1958. Hassan Heshmat is considered the first Egyptian artist to create works in porcelain, his sculptures reflect traditional, patriotic and emotional themes. His work has been exhibited widely, and is held in a number of collections and institutions all around the world. Heshmat has been awarded prestigious local and international prizes, winning silver and gold medals at the International Ceramics Competition in Italy in 1964 and 1965 as well as winning first prize in a competition to build a memorial monument for a church in Belgium in 1970. Heshmat was awarded a Certificate of Merit by the Egyptian Fine Arts Academy in 1980, as well as a Certificate of Appreciation from the Ministry of Culture in 1995, and was later awarded the Egyptian state's Appreciation Award.

== Life ==
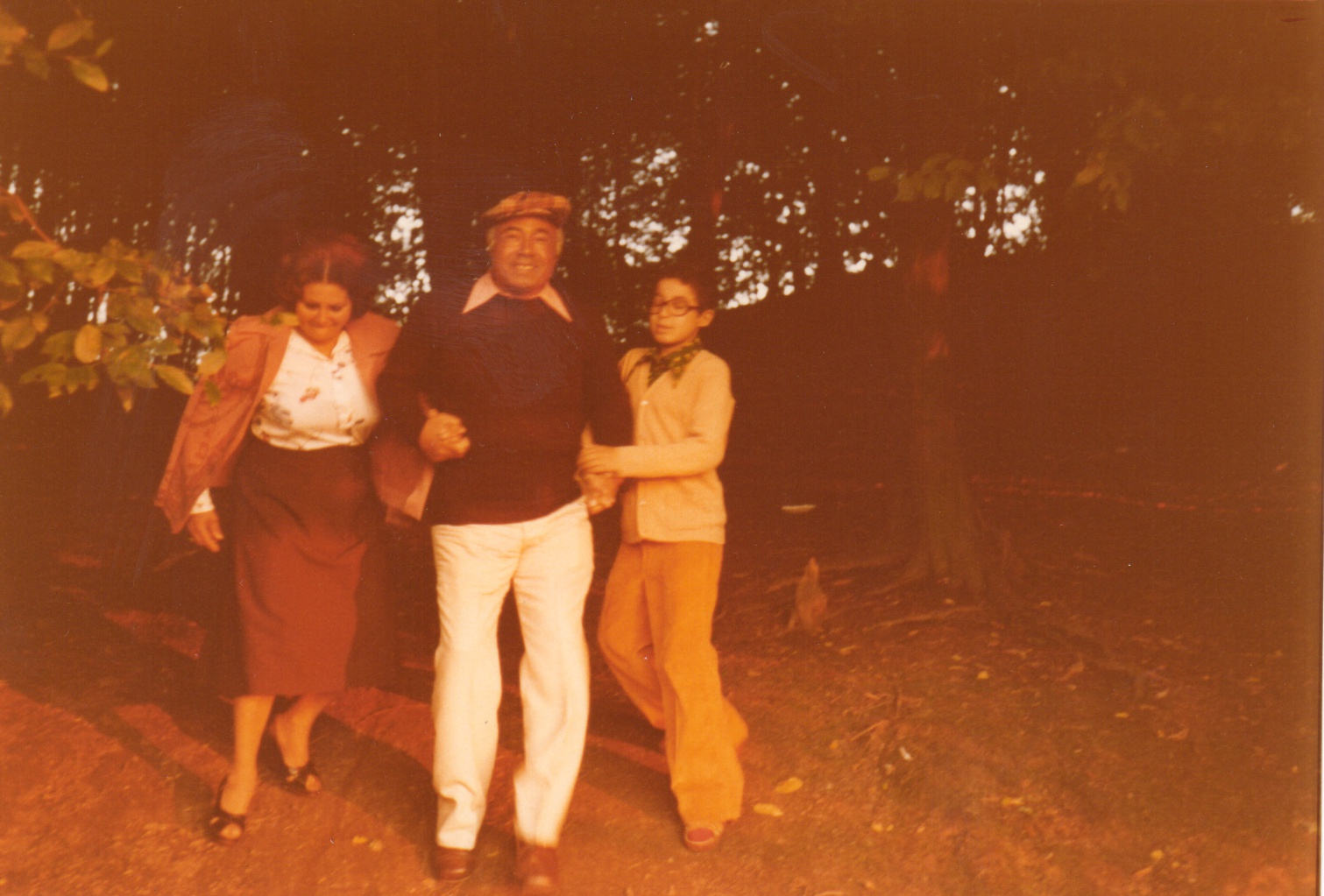
Hassan Heshmat with his wife Madiha and his son Bassam

Hassan Heshmat was married to Zeinab Hegazy, with whom he had three daughters, Sohair, Magda and Sonia, and one son, Alaa. After his wife Zeinab died, Heshmat married Madiha. Their son Bassam died in his early twenties after suffering from kidney failure (1965-1990). Hassan and Madiha Heshmat founded the Bassam Hospital next to their house in memory of their son. Madiha Heshmat died in their house and museum in February 2020.

== Education ==
Heshmat earned his diploma in Applied Arts, specialising in ceramics (1938), followed by a diploma from the Higher Institute of Technical Education for Teachers (1954). In 1957, he was granted a scholarship to study Porcelain Design in Selb, Bavaria, graduating in 1958. Selb is the hometown of several internationally renowned porcelain manufacturers like Rosenthal and Hutschenreuther (founder of the porcelain factory in 1856).

Heshmat attended elementary school in El Ayyat, where he recalls going out into the schoolyard during recess and drawing pieces of stone or gravel. He preferred to spend his time observing nature instead of playing games with his friends. In pursuing his Fine Arts education, he trained with Egyptian artist Saeed El-Sadr (1909-1986). Heshmat recalls El-Sadr accompanying his students on excursions once a week, to the Egyptian Museum, the Islamic and Coptic Museums, and spending time in nature, where he 'sowed within them a love of drawing nature and life'. Heshmat continued to visit the Egyptian Museum, and described having 'lived' there, performing a 'pilgrimage' where he would discover new artefacts at each visit, exploring what he called the 'treasures of the Egyptian civilisation' and the arts of his ancestors.

== Works ==
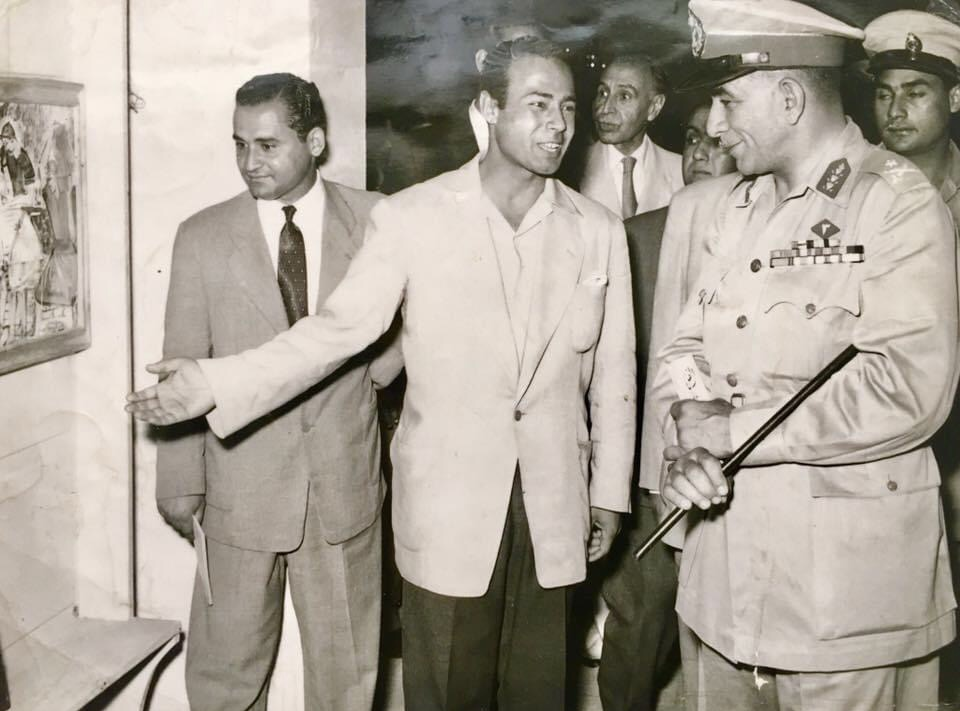
Hassan Heshmat at his first exhibition inaugurated by former Egyptian President Mohamed Naguib, 1953

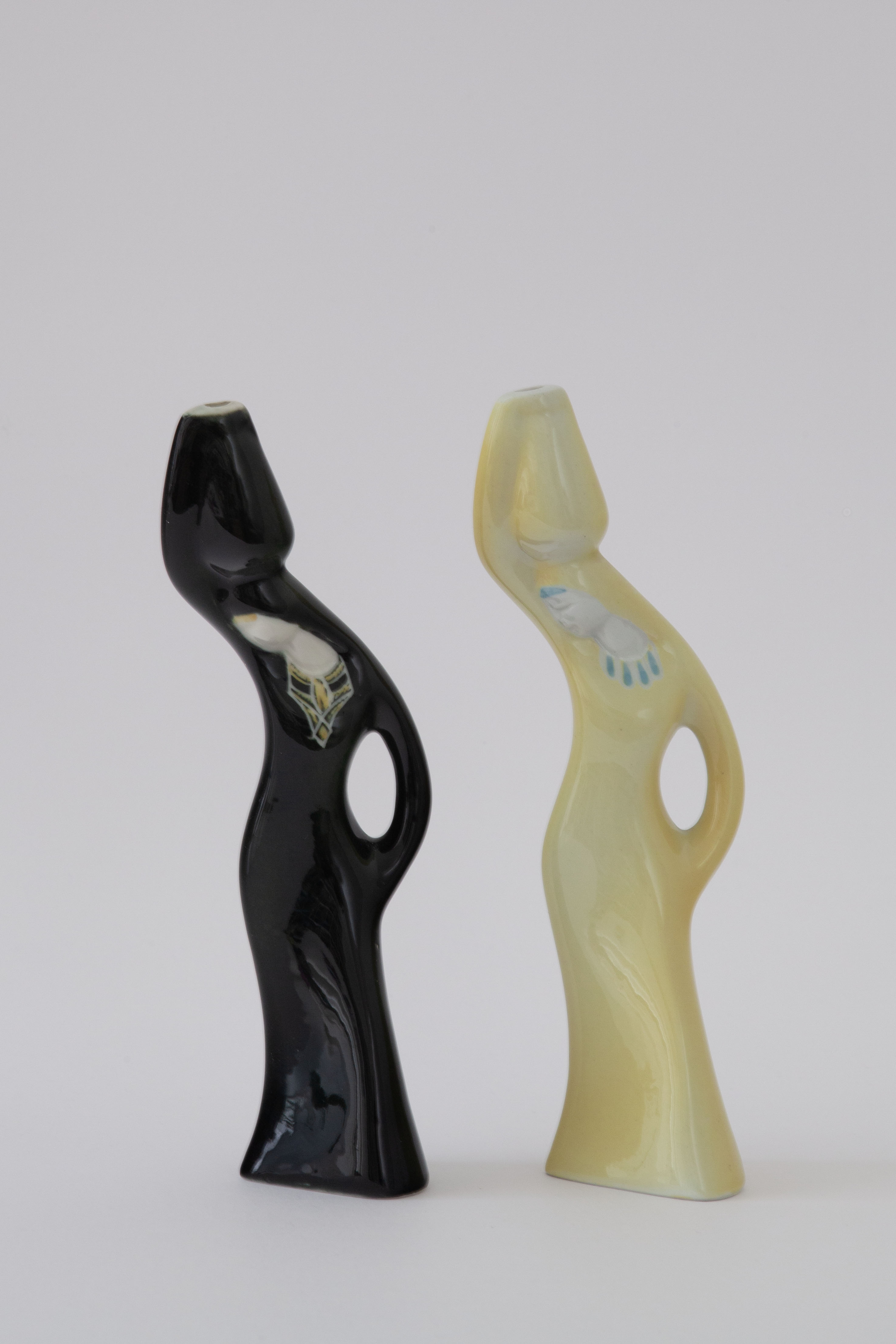
Porcelain sculptures by Hassan Heshmat, 20 cm. Hegasy Collection. Foto: ©CDimitriadis

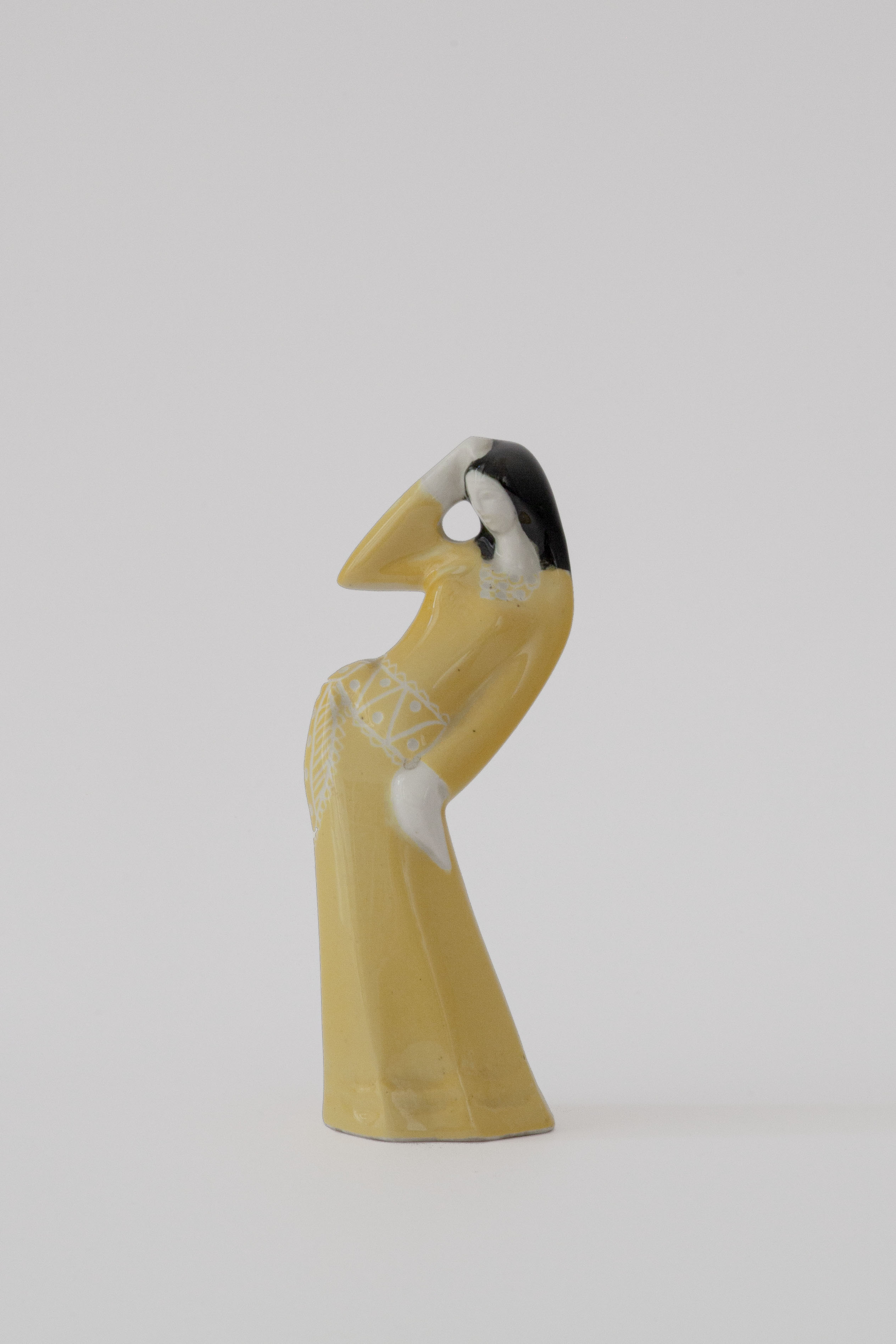
Small porcelain sculpture by Hassan Heshmat, 17 cm. Hegasy Collection. Foto ©CDimitriadis.

Hassan Heshmat worked primarily in sculpture, combining social realism with rural Egyptian subjects and Pharaonic elements. His works reflect emotional, patriotic, and poignant themes, including family, motherhood, love, depictions of peasants and the man of his country (Ibn Al-Balad). A prolific artist, he designed and produced works with accessibility in mind, creating intricate scalable works in both large-scale and smaller scale sizes. He was the first Egyptian sculptor to cast mini porcelain sculptures, which were popularly collected and admired. Heshmat created a number of large-scale sculptures, several of which were commissions for public installations in Egypt and abroad. He designed the Bride of the Red Sea, an iconic sculpture of eight meters that became the emblem of the Red Sea Governorate. In addition to sculptures and installations, Heshmat created drawings, paintings, and reliefs in his own distinctive visual language.

The artist rose to fame during the era of Gamal Abdel Nasser. Throughout his career, Heshmat exhibited widely, in group and solo exhibitions, in both local and international contexts. He held notable solo exhibitions in London (1956), Paris (1957), West Germany (1958), Syria (1960), Rome (1967), Geneva and Frankfurt (1968), Holland and Stockholm (1969), Belgium (1970), Norway (1971) and Lausanne (1976). His works are in the collections of the Museum of Modern Art in Cairo, the Museum of Applied Arts, Budapest, the Museum of Mankind (Musée de l'Homme), Paris, the National Museum of Warsaw, and the Peking Museum in China, among others.

In June 2006, Heshmat's work garnered different attention when an attack on his figurative sculptures made headlines. The attack was religiously motivated, a veiled woman who claimed to be carrying out orders sought to destroy works at the Hassan Heshmat Museum in the middle of the night, screaming 'Infidels, Infidels!'. According to an article in the Daily Telegraph, the damaged works included a Motherhood sculpture, 'featuring three delicately carved heads, all of which had been snapped off'. Also damaged was Heshmat's The Victory Leap, the artist's 'tribute to Egyptian troops in the 1973 Yom Kippur war' at the 6th of October Panorama. In 2023, a presentation of his works took place in January at the ArtTalks Gallery in Cairo.

== The Hassan Heshmat Museum ==
Located in Ain Shams, the Hassan Heshmat Museum is the artist's former residence and studio, where he lived and worked. The artist's 1,200-metre villa was turned into a museum of his work, gifted to the Ministry of Culture, with an annexed workshop to serve young artists from the surrounding area. The museum's collection includes over 200 of the pioneering artist's sculptures and ceramics. The museum features a sculpture garden populated with large-scale editions of some of Heshmat's most notable works.
