= Allassani =

Allassani is a surname. Notable people with the surname include:

- Reise Allassani (born 1996), English footballer
- J. H. Allassani (1906–?), Ghanaian teacher and politician

== Other ==
- Allasani Peddana, famous Telugu poet

== See also ==
- Alassane
