= Alassane =

Alassane is a given name or surname that is an alternative transliteration of Al-Hassan. Notable people with the name include:

- Abdou Alassane Dji Bo (born 1979), Nigerien judoka
- Alassane Diatta (born 2005), Senegalese footballer
- Alassane N'Dour (born 1981), Senegalese football player
- Alassane Ouattara (born 1942), current President of Côte d'Ivoire
- Ismaël Alassane (born 1984), Nigerien football defender

== See also ==
- Allassani
- Lassana
