= Egyptian National Military Museum =

Coordinates: 30°01′46″N 31°15′41″E

Egyptian National Military Museum المتحف الحربي
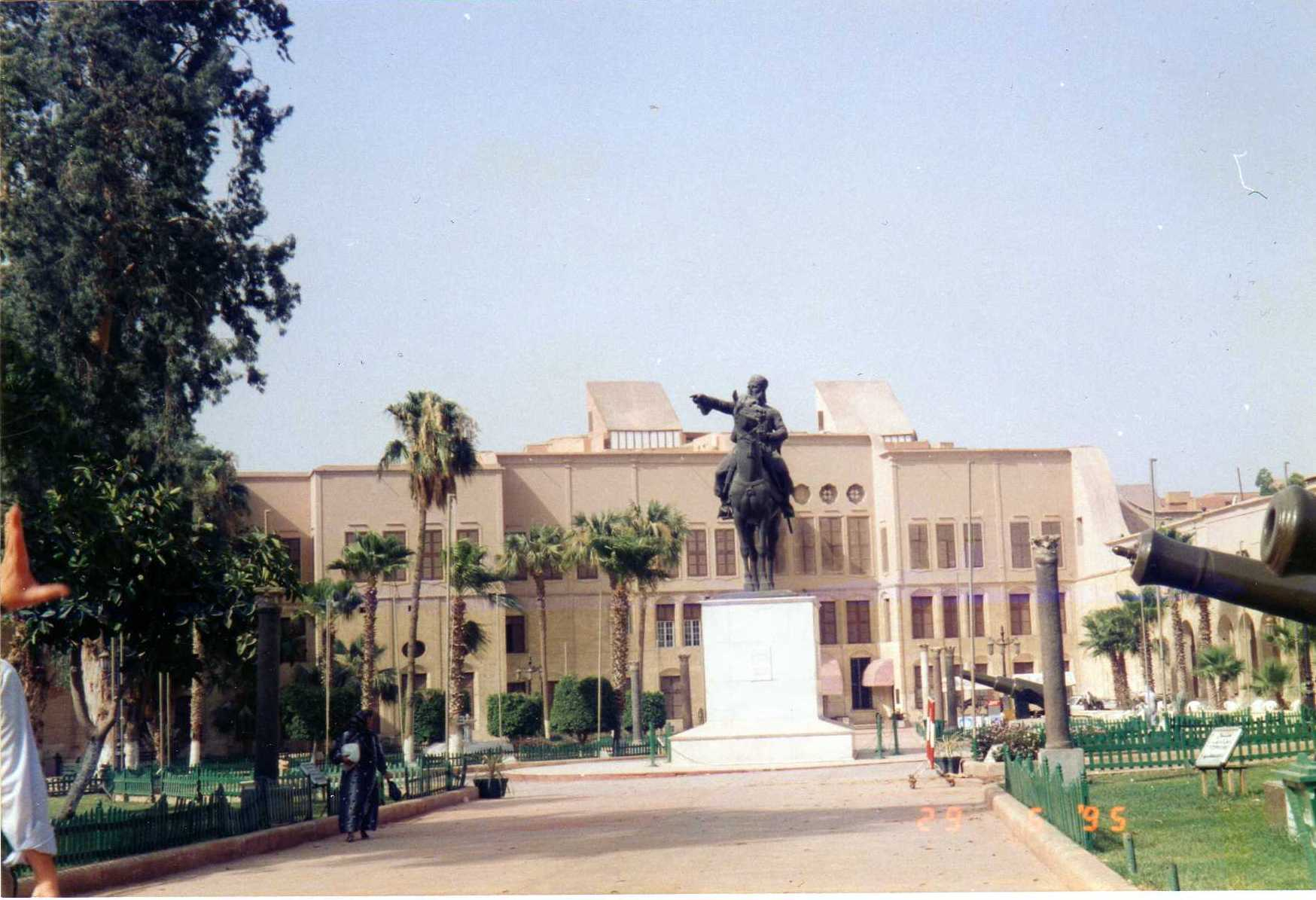
- Statue of Ibrahim Pasha at the entrance to the Egyptian National Military museum
- Established: 1938; 88 years ago
- Location: Cairo Citadel, Cairo, Egypt
- Type: Military museum
- Collection size: Historical armament of Egyptian Army
- Visitors: Public

The Egyptian National Military Museum is the official museum of the Egyptian Army, Egyptian Armed Forces. It is located in the Cairo Citadel in Cairo, Egypt.

== Overview ==
The Egyptian National Military Museum is located at the north western area of the three Haram Palaces, inside the Cairo Citadel that was built by Saladin. It overlooks the Mokattam Hills and the entrance to the Citadel. The Haram Palaces were constructed by Mohamed Ali Pasha in 1812.

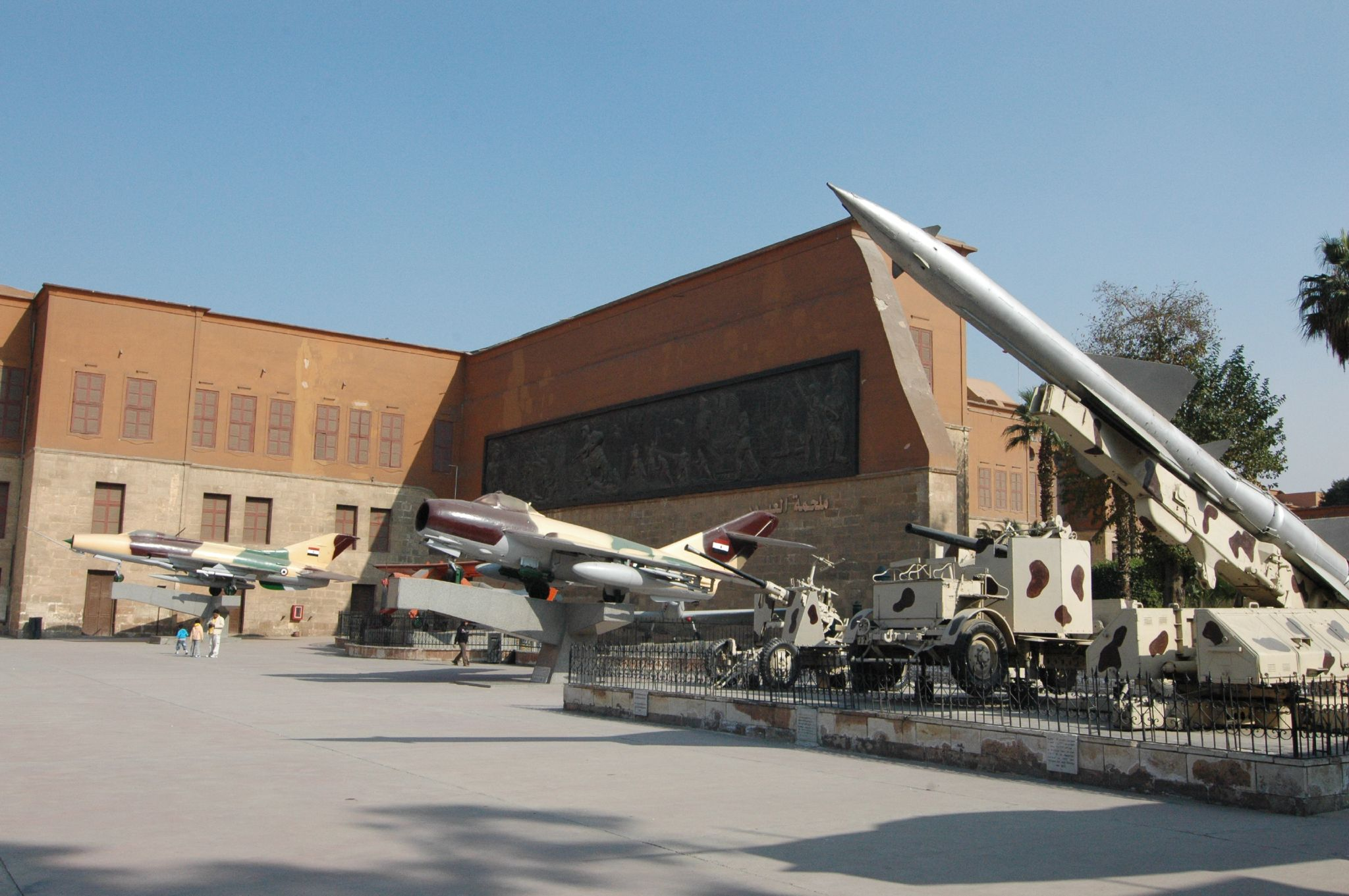
Museum facade

The museum was established in 1937 at the old building of the Egyptian Ministry of War in downtown Cairo. It was later moved to a temporary location in the Garden City district of Cairo. In November 1949 the museum was moved to the Haram Palace at the Cairo citadel. It has been renovated several times since, in 1982, 1993 and 2011.

== Notable halls ==
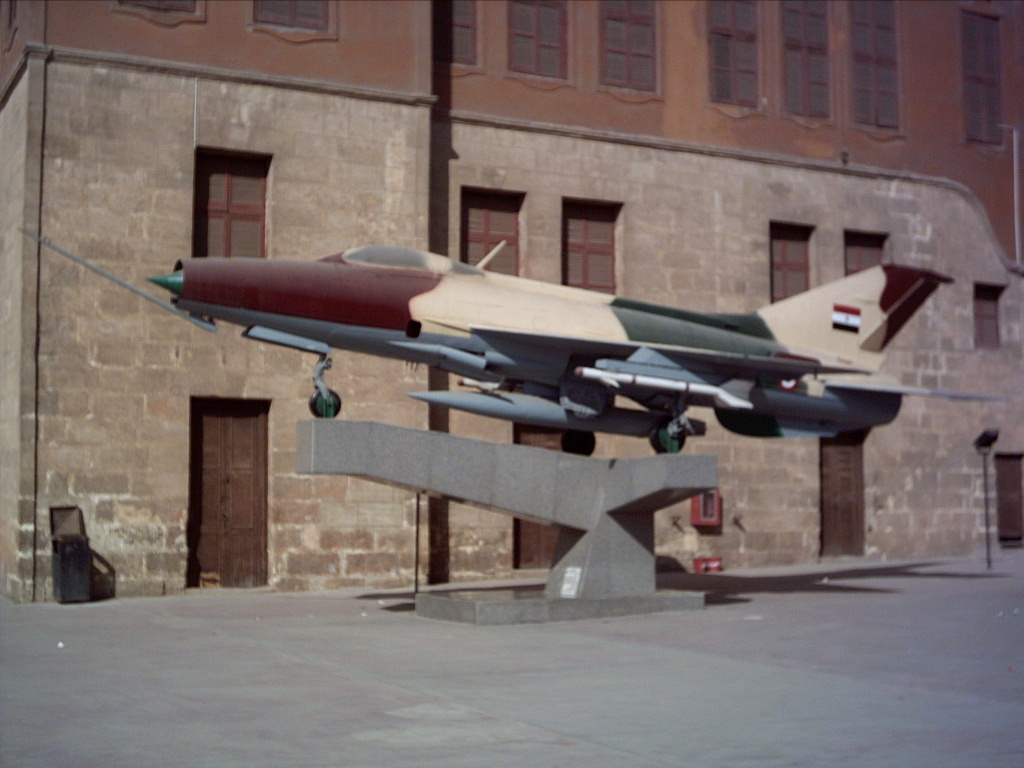
MiG-21F at the National Military Museum of Egypt

- Ottoman and Mohamed Ali Pasha Militaria Hall
- 1948 Arab–Israeli War Hall
- 1952 Revolution Hall
- 1956 Suez War Hall
- 1967 War Hall
- 1973 War Hall (not detailed due to dedication of 6th of October Panorama as a museum to 1973 war)

== See also ==
- 6th of October Panorama
- List of museums in Egypt

== Gallery ==
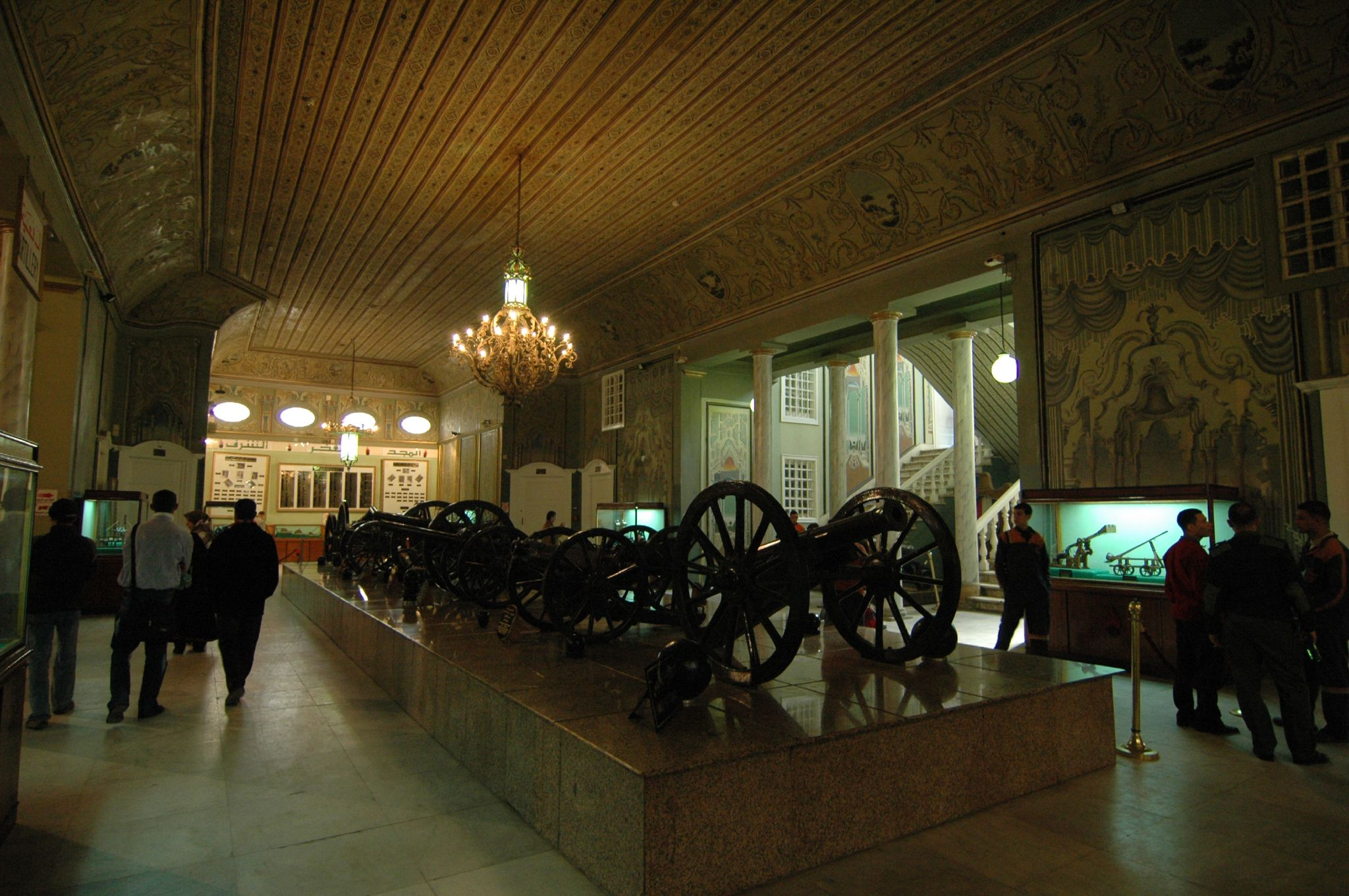

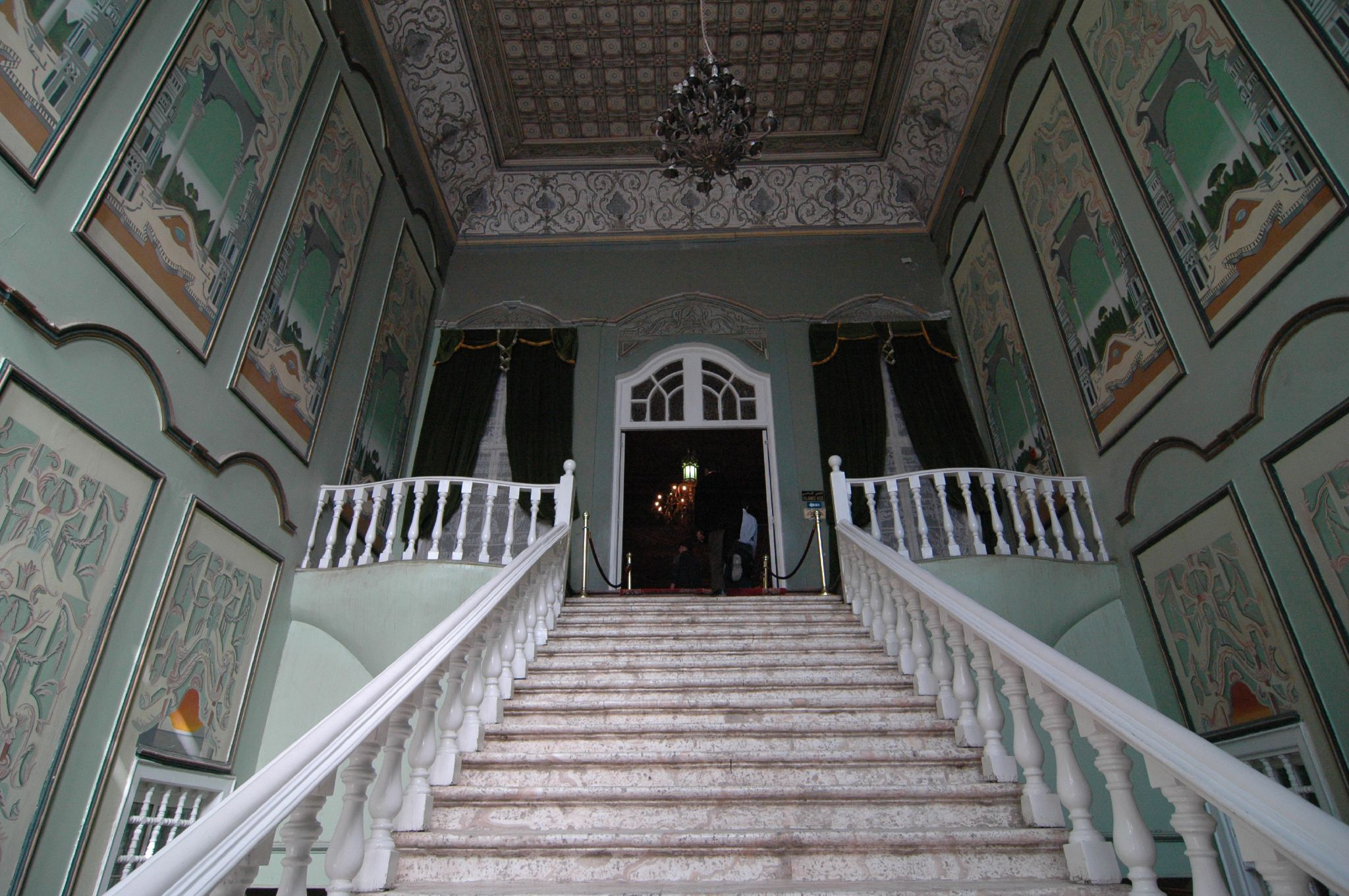

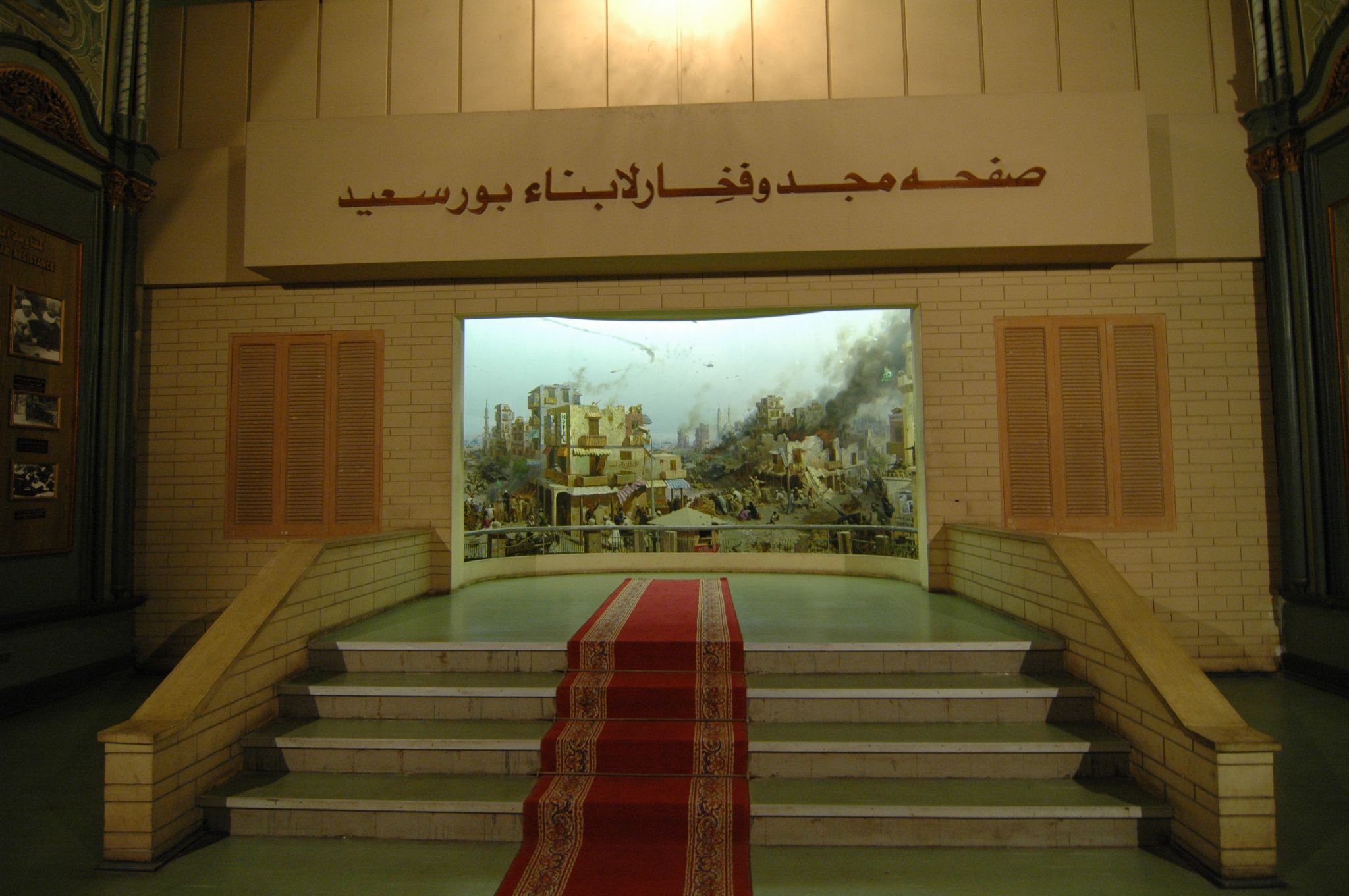

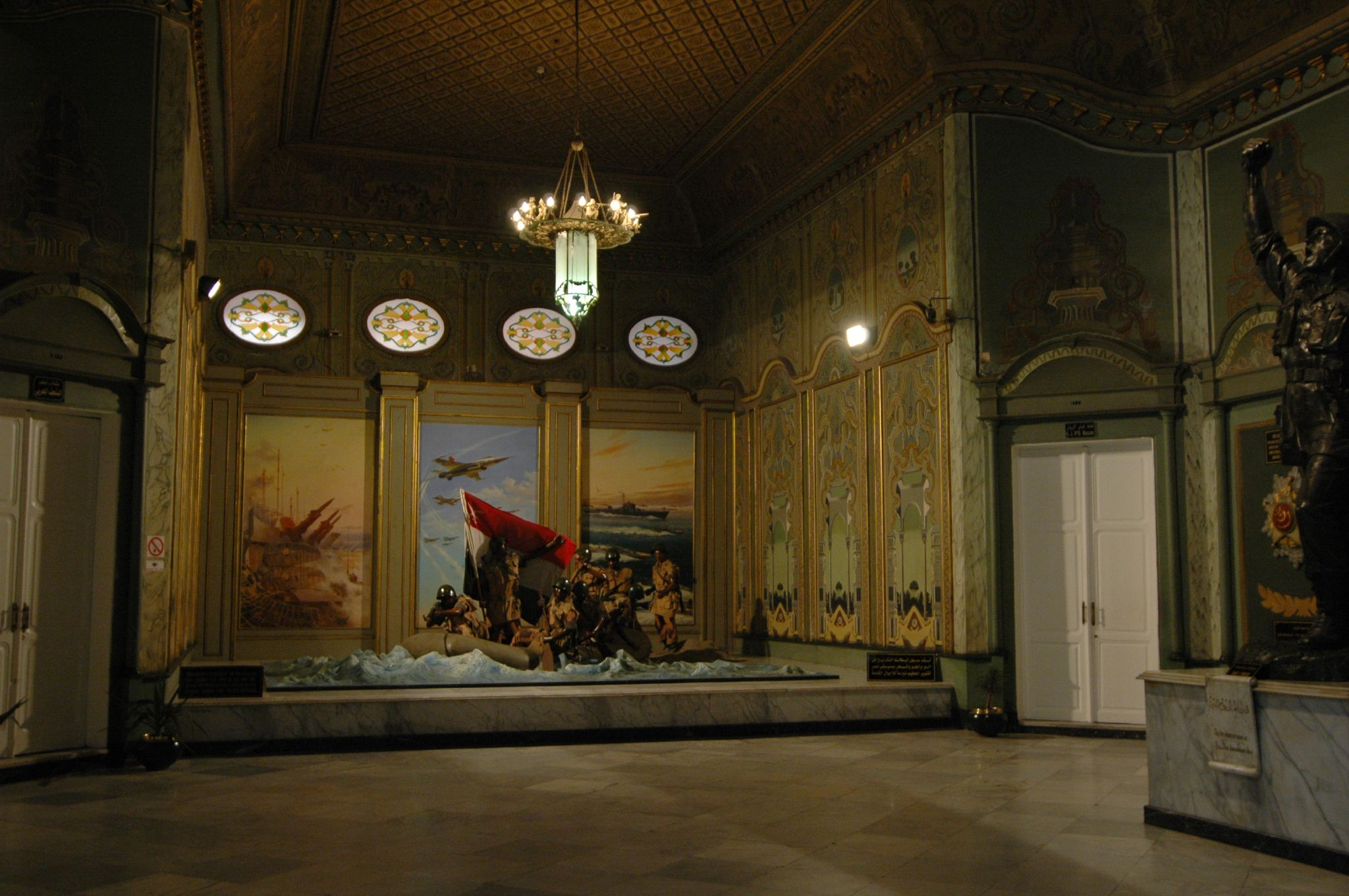

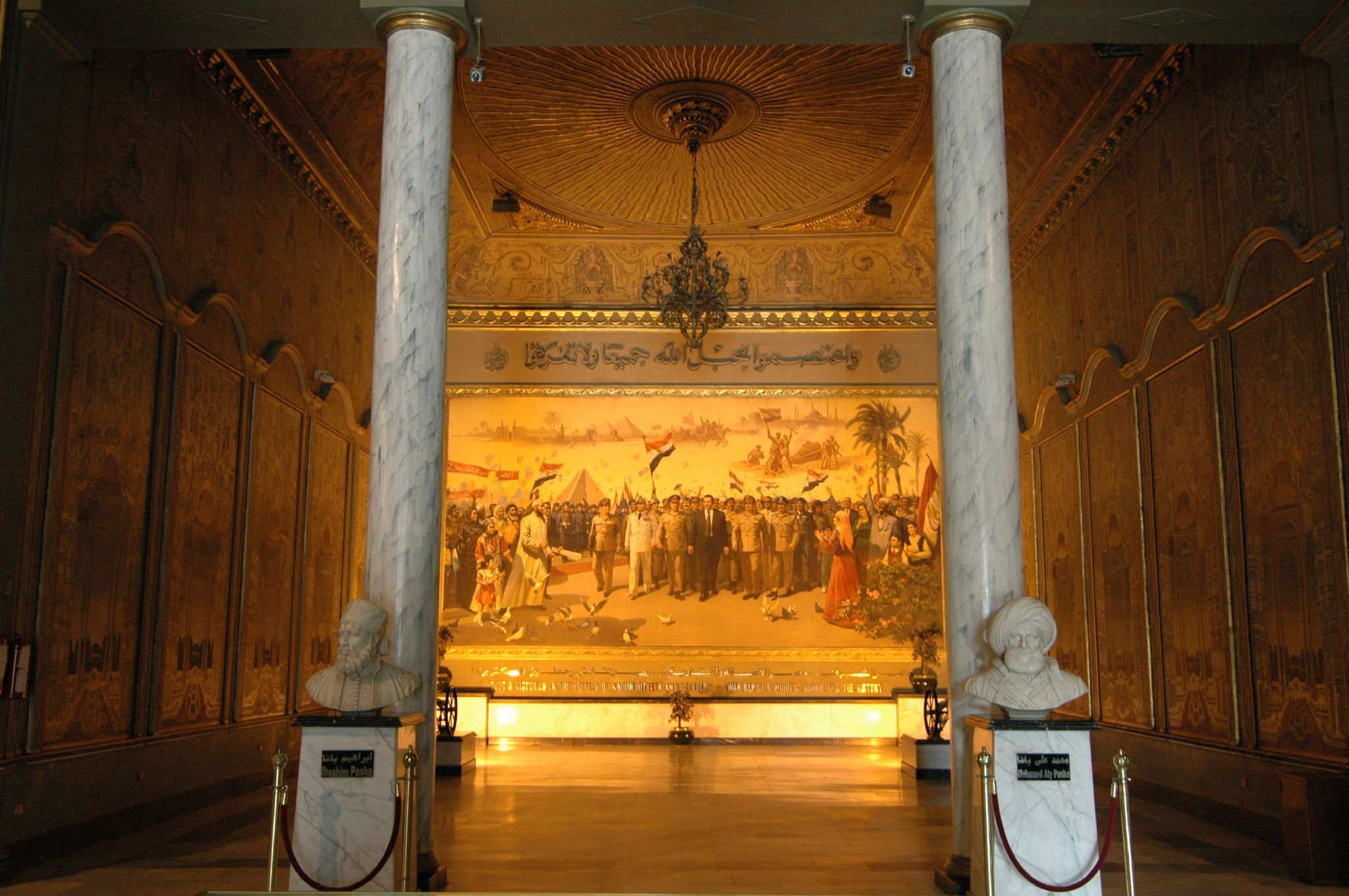

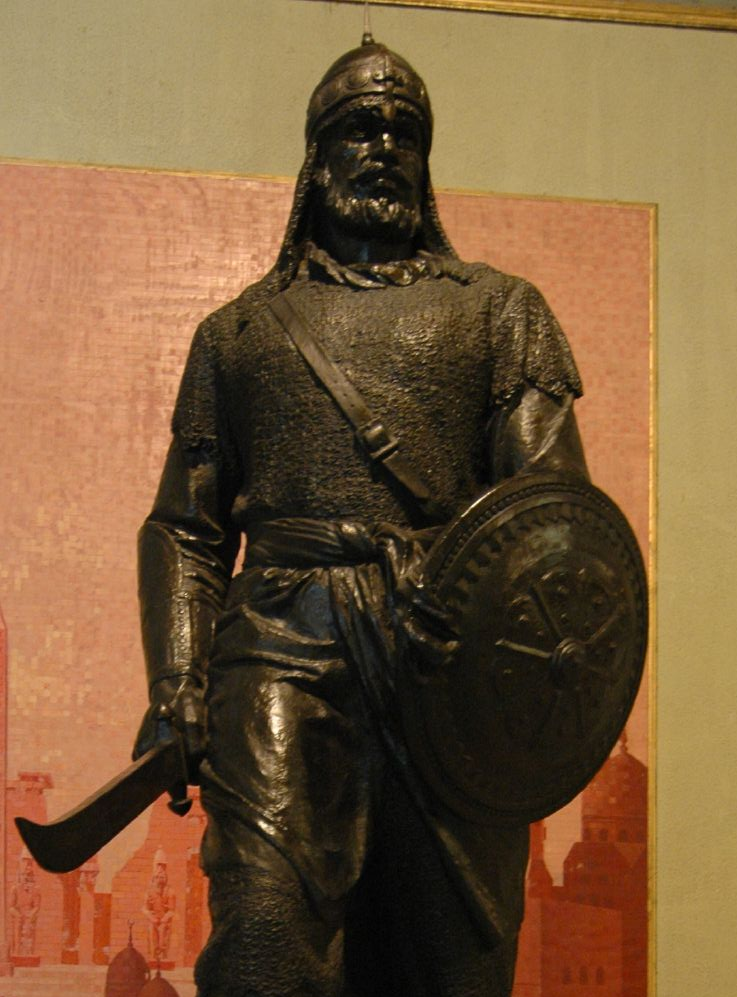

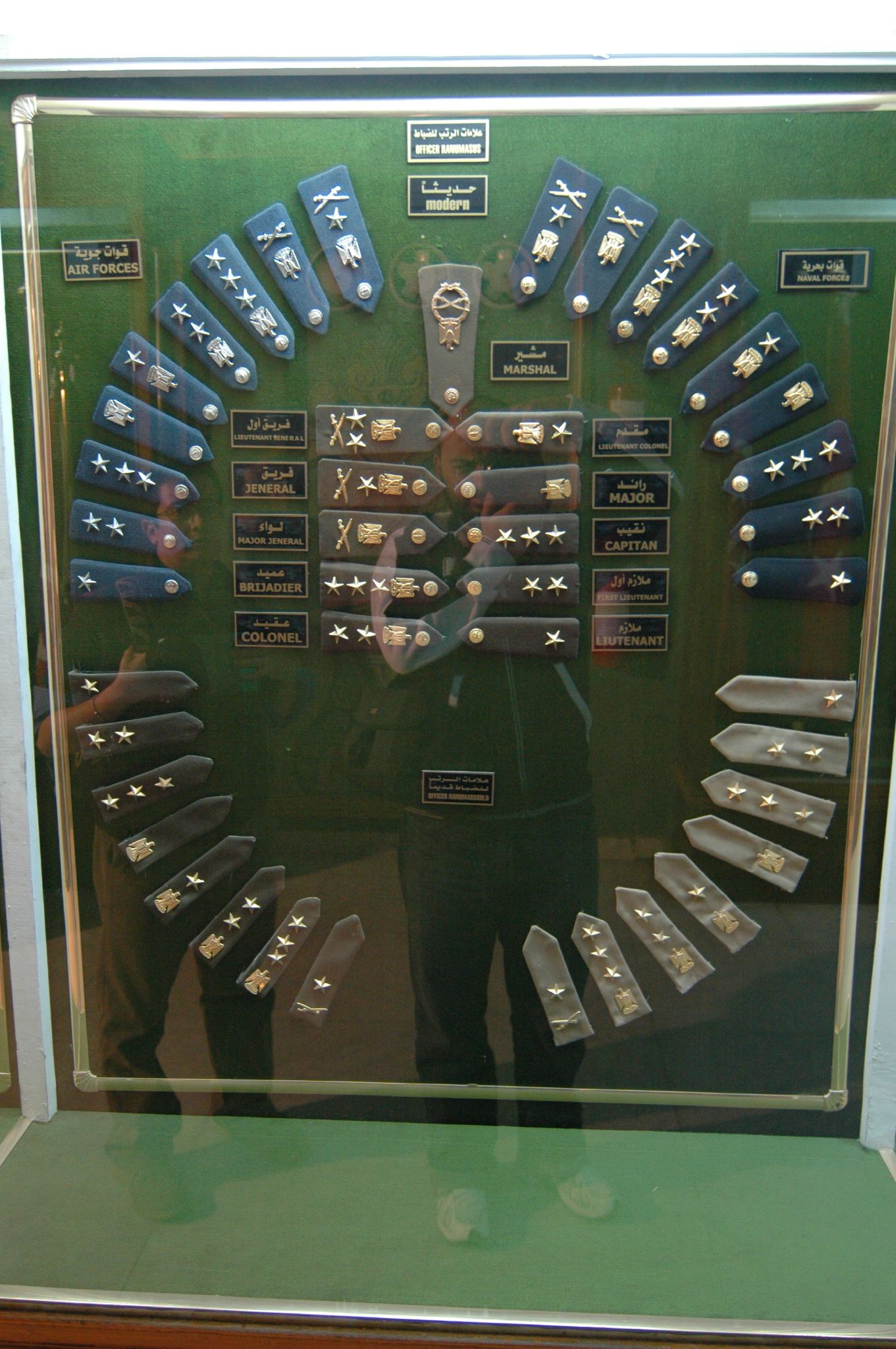
