= October War Panorama =

- بانوراما حرب تشرين
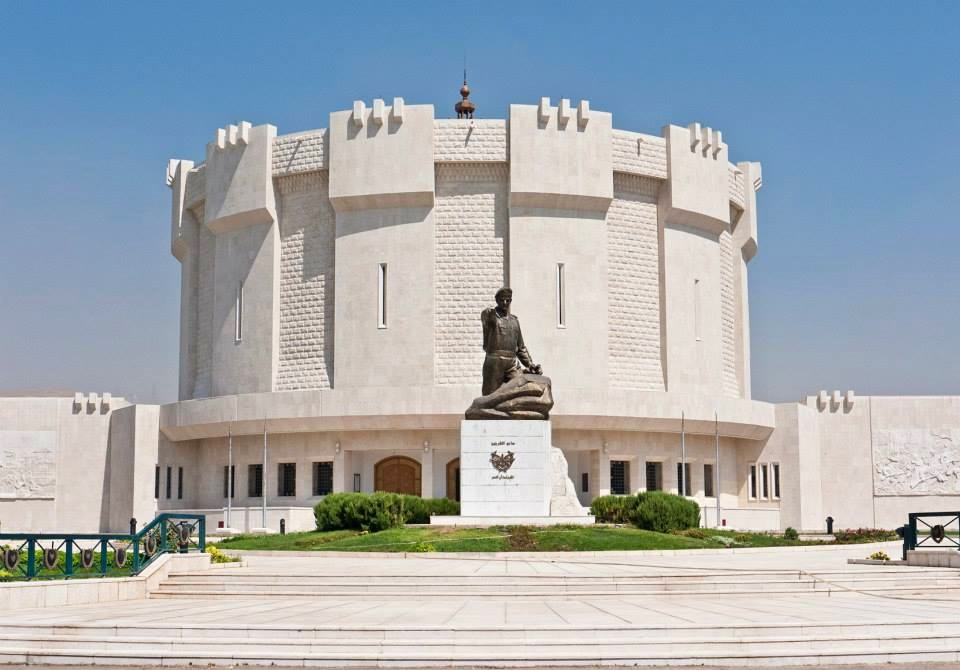
- The exterior of the building

- Location in Damascus October War Panorama (Syria)
- Established: 1998
- Location: Damascus, Syria
- Coordinates: 33.5354°N 36.3207°E
- Type: National museum

The October War Panorama (Arabic: بانوراما حرب تشرين, romanized: Bānūrāmā Ḥarb Tishrīn) is a National museum located in Damascus, Syria which commemorates the memory of the 1973 October War between Egypt and Syria against Israel from a Syrian perspective, and the 1982 Lebanon War battles that were fought against Israel.

== History ==
The museum, like Egypt's 6th of October Panorama, was built with the assistance of North Korea, as evident by the socialist-realist reliefs in the museum and a large mural showcasing Assad hand-in-hand with Kim il-Sung.

The museum was inaugurated in 1998 by president Hafez al-Assad.

After the fall of the Assad regime, people ransacked and destroyed parts of the building.

== Exhibits ==
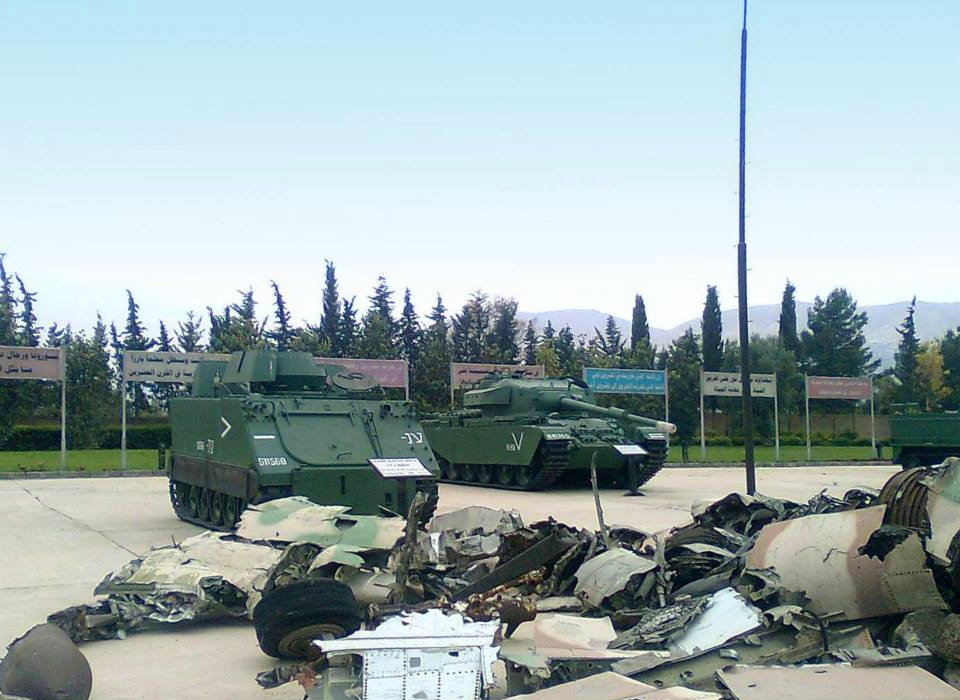
Remains of Israeli jets downed by the Syrian air defense systems and captured Israeli tank and APC

The museum displays the tanks, jets and weaponry used by Syria during the war, most of them Soviet-made, captured Israeli weaponry, such as Israeli tanks, most of them captured during the 1973 war, with an exception of a tank captured from Israel in the Battle of Sultan Yacoub which occurred during the 1982 Lebanon War, as well as the wreckage and remains of Israeli jets downed by the Syrian Air Defense Force.

The museum also contains many large gallery halls featuring large commemorative paintings and murals depicting former Syrian president Hafez al-Assad, most notably a 238 m2 painting of the president flanked by the Syrian people.

Also in the panorama are large paintings depicting the battles of the war and Syrian soldiers. The painters of the murals featured in the galleries are said to have used real soldiers and veterans as models for their work and had spent extended periods of time in the locations depicted in the paintings.

Various paintings depict the history of Syria, which are a mix of Arab and Syrian nationalism. These include a commemoration of the third millennium BC Syrian kingdom of Ebla, Queen Zenobia of Palmyra consulting her senate, Al-Walid I flanked by Musa bin Nusayr and Tariq Ibn Ziyad, and the last painting showcasing Saladin in Jerusalem flanked by vanquished crusaders.

== 3D panorama ==
The main part of the museum is the 3D panorama. The viewer is seated on a rotating platform, submerged in a depiction of the battle for Quneitra in the Golan Heights, while pre-recorded narrations of the war and the battle play through speakers.

== See also ==
- 6th of October Panorama
