= Hassan II (disambiguation) =

Hassan II was King of Morocco from 1961 until his death in 1999.

Hassan II or Hasan II may also refer to:

- Hassan II of Alamut, or Ḥasan ʿAlā Zikrihi's-Salām, Nizari imam (leader) of the Assassins from 1162 until 1166
- Hassan II of the Maldives, fifth Sultan to ascend the throne of Maldives from the Hilaaly Dynasty
- Hasan II (Bavandid ruler), or Fakhr el Dawlah Hasan, ruler of the Bavand dynasty from 1334 to 1349
- Hasan II or Hasan-Jalal Dawla, Armenian feudal prince and namesake of the House of Hasan-Jalalyan
