= Patrick Trémeau =

French serial rapist

Patrick Trémeau (born September 27, 1963) is a French serial rapist, active in the 11th and 20th arrondissements of Paris during the 1990s. Nicknamed The Parking Rapist, he prowled mainly at night, attacking women in underground car parks under the threat of a knife, before raping them.

Trémeau was sentenced to 16 years' imprisonment in 1998. He was released in May 2005 after 10 years of detention, whereupon he reoffended and was arrested in September of that same year. At the same time, a law was passed concerning recidivism, and Trémeau was given 20 years' imprisonment with a 10-year imprisonment term in February 2009.

== Biography ==
Trémeau came from a poor family, with two other children. He lived with his mother Janine, a housekeeper, in the city of Hautes-Mardelles in Brunoy, Essonne. He did not know his father, and later claimed that his father-in-law hit and abused him. Patrick was handed over to various different homes from a very young age, with his mother describing him as "the devil's envoy". Despite being unstable, suffering from nervous disorders and failing academically, Trémeau was nevertheless considered friendly and talented with manual labor. In the early 1980s, he earned a plumbing certificate, finding work easily, and doing in a manner considered satisfactory by his employers.

== Early crimes ==
In 1984, Trémeau was arrested for masturbating in front of a hitchhiker. He was handed a 18-month sentence in prison, 10 of which were suspended for indecent assault. He was released after serving the sentence.

In 1987, he raped a woman in Créteil. For this crime, he was given a 7-year sentence by the Assize Court of Val-de-Marne, for rape under the threat of a weapon.

In 1990, Trémeau was released from prison, and was hired as a storekeeper at a hardware store. His behavior towards his female colleagues was not abnormal, with Patrick successfully seducing several of them, but they quickly left him, which greatly affected Trémeau, who couldn't stand break-ups. Everything went well until 1992, where he made several suicide attempts because of break-ups, before abruptly quitting his job.

=== Rapes from 1993 to 1995 ===
Between April 1993 and March 1995, Trémeau raped 8 women and tried to violate 5 others, always in the same manner. His victims were all women, from 20 to 35 years, with long hair (primarily brunettes), always with a job that made them return late at night. When he spotted a victim, Trémeau followed them to the building and usually waited for them to come back and park their car in the parking lot. Afterwards, he threatened them with a knife and raped them in the dark, where he couldn't be seen. His assaults always took place between midnight and 4 a.m., in the underground car parks of the 11th and 20th arrondissements of Paris. At the beginning of the aggressions, he would always be menacing, but once the victim subjected, his behavior changed radically and his words became soft, with him embracing and even complimenting the victim. When he raped, he always used a condom, and would sometimes throw the wrapper on the crime scene, without leaving fingerprints. In March 1995, he raped a woman almost every week.

The police investigation was very difficult, because there was no exploitable index, and the composite sketches were imprecise. At the same time, in the eastern sector of Paris, there was another active serial killer, Guy Georges. Some of Georges' crimes also took place in underground car parks. For a while, the police believed that this was the work of a single individual, but only after arresting Guy did they realise that there were two different predators, operating in the same geographical area.

Trémeau was arrested in March 1995, for breaking cars in a parking lot. At the police station, during his interrogation, a policeman noticed that he was trying to get rid of an empty condom wrapper. At the same time during the interview, Trémeau's last victim, Gladys, was filing a rape complaint. She mentioned that she very well saw that her rapist wore yellow shoes, a detail which caught the attention of Commandant Bertrand, who noticed that Trémeau also wore yellow shoes. Officers then made him take off his shoes and brought them to the office, where Gladys was, and she immediately recognized them. The police conducted a lineup, and among the group of men, through a beam splitter, Gladys immediately identified Trémeau. Subsequently, the other victims of Trémeau also identified him, some managing to do it only by hearing his voice.

Trémeau almost instantly confessed to all the rapes he committed while in custody, but denied having threatened the women with a knife.

=== Trial and sentence ===
The trial began in October 1998, to almost total indifference: no journalist was present to cover the event, despite the high number of victims (13). The last of the said victims was not informed about the holding of the trial and, thus, could be a civil party. After the trial, Trémeau was sentenced to 16 years' imprisonment, together with a minimum sentence of 8 years.

=== Detention and release ===
In the years following his conviction, Trémeau repeatedly asked for early release, to no avail. On May 7, 2005, after spending 10 years in prison, he was released from the prison in Melun, near the end of the sentence. He was put on parole, but without any obligation to report his situation to a social worker.

=== Recidivism and arrest ===
On June 5, 2005, a 24-year-old woman named Cecilia was attacked and raped in the garbage room of her apartment building, in the 16th arrondissement of Paris. On June 20, another young woman was attacked in her building on Thionville Street, in the 19th arrondissement (the circumstances of this attack remain unclear), and finally, a third victim was assaulted on September 17, 2005. The Judicial Police of Paris, who were in charge of these rape cases, came to the certainty that these women had been attacked by the same rapist that plagued the city 10 years earlier: Patrick Trémeau. Two inspectors went to his mother's home, finding him there. Arrested, Patrick made a tearful confession, but denied raping Cecilia, the first victim.

=== Second trial ===
Trémeau's second trial began on February 3, 2009. Almost all of the affected victims, except two, were present. During the trial, it appeared that Trémeau seemed regretful about what he did to the victims. Henri Leclerc, his attorney, emphasized on that fact, as well as his client's difficult childhood (the alleged violence at the hands of his father-in-law and by staff members at the different homes). The verdict condemned Trémeau to 20 years' imprisonment (as advocated by advocate general Philippe Bilger, a staunch believer of redemption and of Patrick's truthful remorse), with a 10-year sentence of medical care after his release.

== The victims' fight ==
Marie-Ange Le Boulaire, Anne Bordier and others from Trémeau's victims denounced his release, warning that he had no socio-judicial control and would likely reoffend.

== Bibliography ==
- The Rape by Marie-Ange Le Boulaire, 190 pages, published on December 2, 2004, by J'ai lu ISBN 2-2903-3199-6

== Documentaries ==
Documentaries used as sources for writing this article:

- "Patrick Trémeau, the Parking Rapist" in October 2009 and March 2011 in "Enter the Accused", presented by Christophe Hondelatte on France 2.
- "Trémeau case: the Parking Rapist" (first report) on February 20, 2016, in "Chroniques criminelles" on NT1.

== Radio ==
- "Patrick Trémeau, the Parking Rapist" on December 27, 2013, and February 19, 2016, in "L'Heure du crime", presented by Jacques Pradel on RTL.

== See also ==
=== External links ===
- Archives of the INA
