= Hasan I (disambiguation) =

Hassan I of Morocco or Hassan ben Mohammed (1836-1894) was the Alaouite sultan of Morocco from 1873 to 1894.

Hasan I may also refer to:

- Hasan I or Al-Hajjam al-Hasan ibn Muhammad ibn al-Qasim
- Hasan I or Hasan the Great, ruler of the Melikdom of Khachen in Karabakh, the forerunner of the House of Hasan-Jalalyan
- Hassan I of the Maldives, Sultan of the Maldives 1388 to 1398
