= 6th of October Panorama =

Museum and war memorial in Cairo, Egypt

Coordinates: 30°04′27″N 31°18′24″E

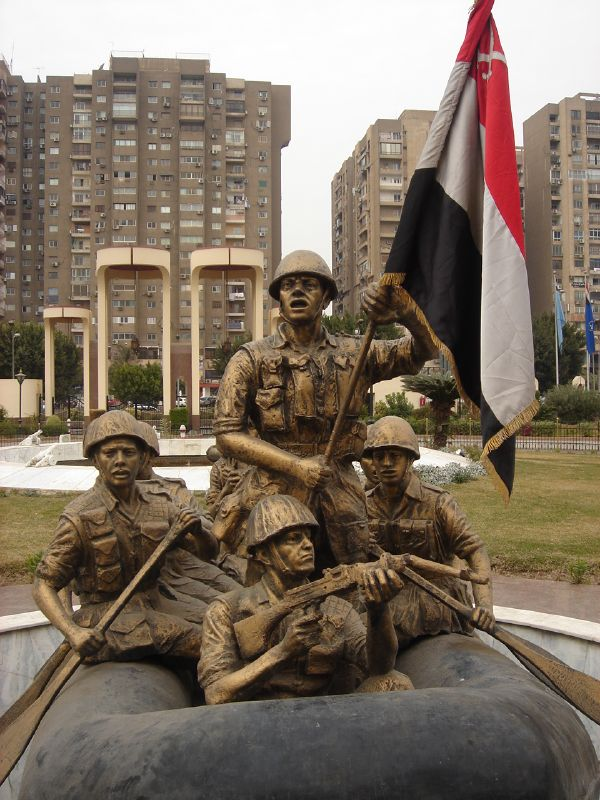
Statue of Egyptian soldiers crossing the Suez canal

The 6th of October War Panorama is a museum and memorial to the 1973 October war, located in Heliopolis, Cairo. Constructed over an area of 7.5 feddans (around 32,000 square metres), it was inaugurated on 5 October 1989 by former Egyptian president Hosni Mubarak. It was built as a cylindrical fort-like building molded in Islamic architectural style with partial assistance from a group of North Korean architects and is run by the Egyptian National Military Museums Department.

== The Panorama ==
The panorama, 1973.

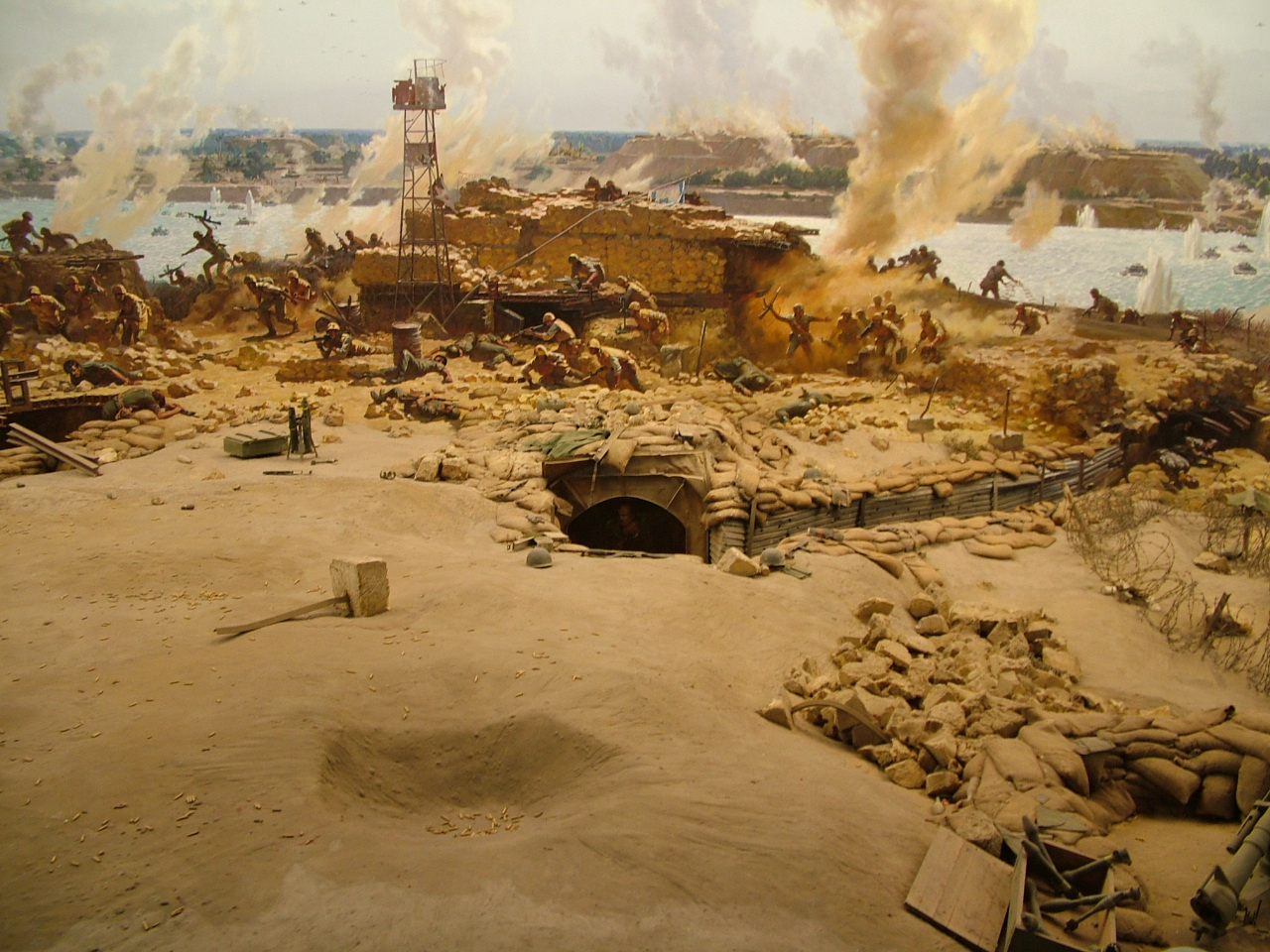

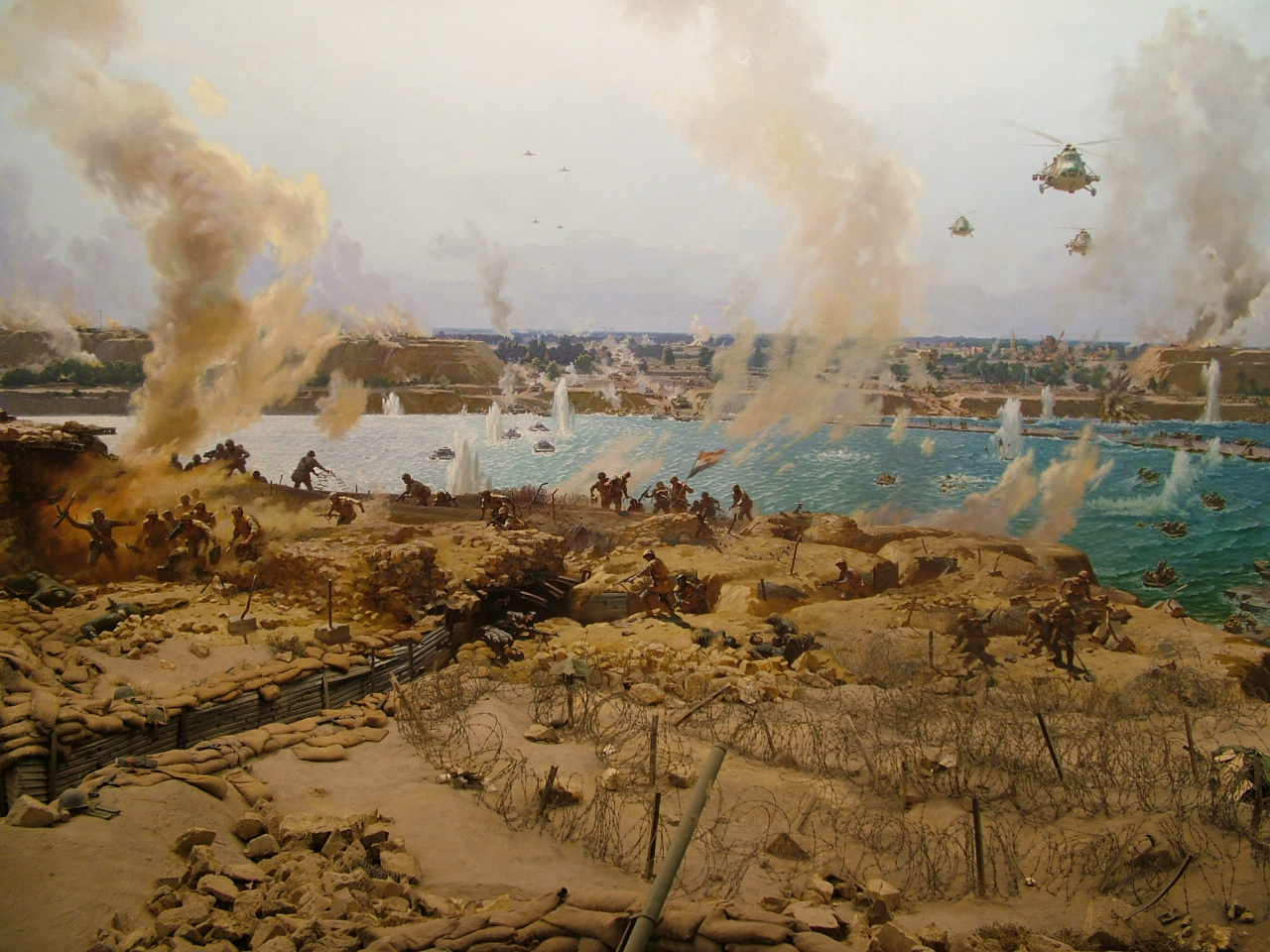

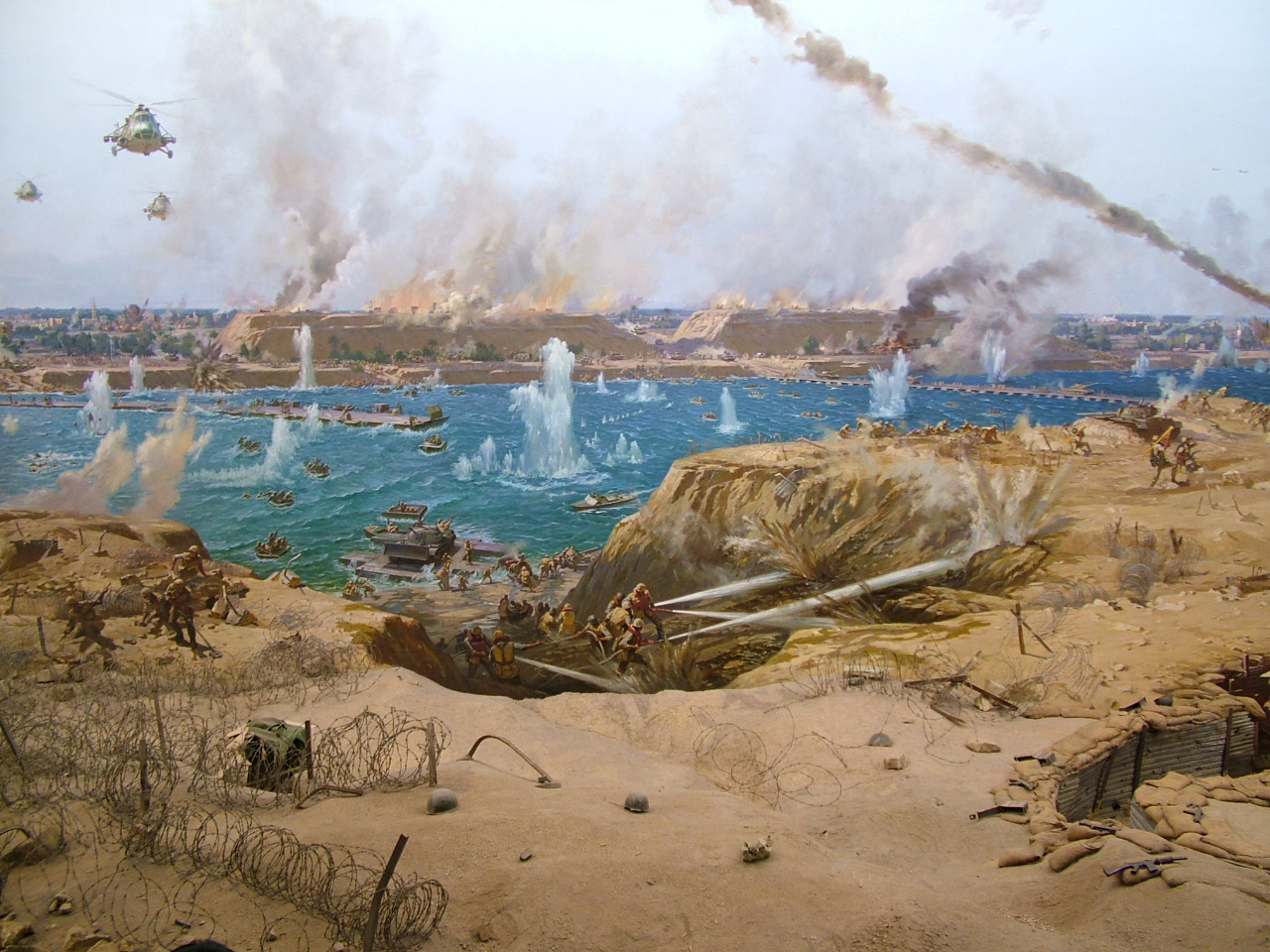

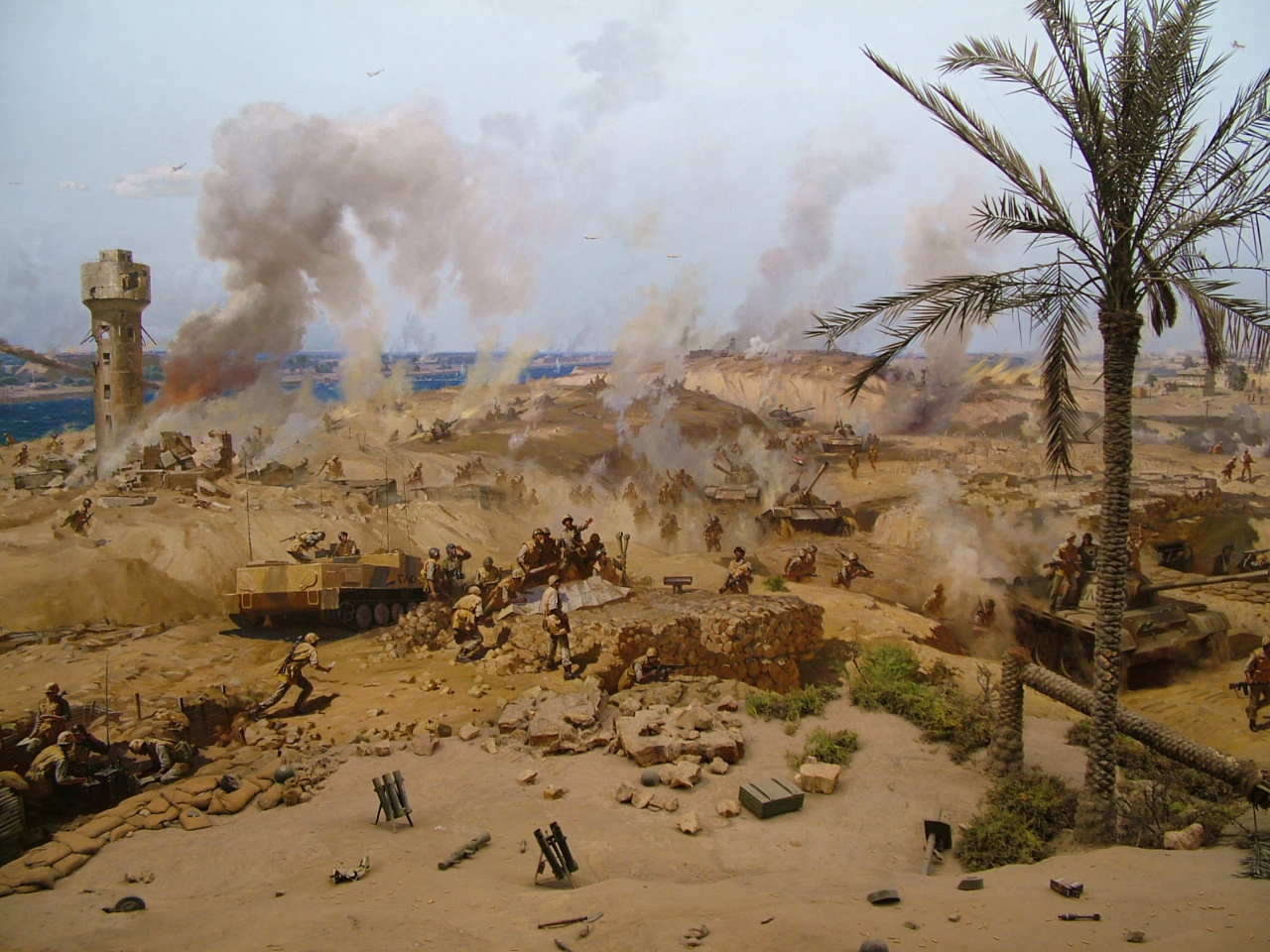

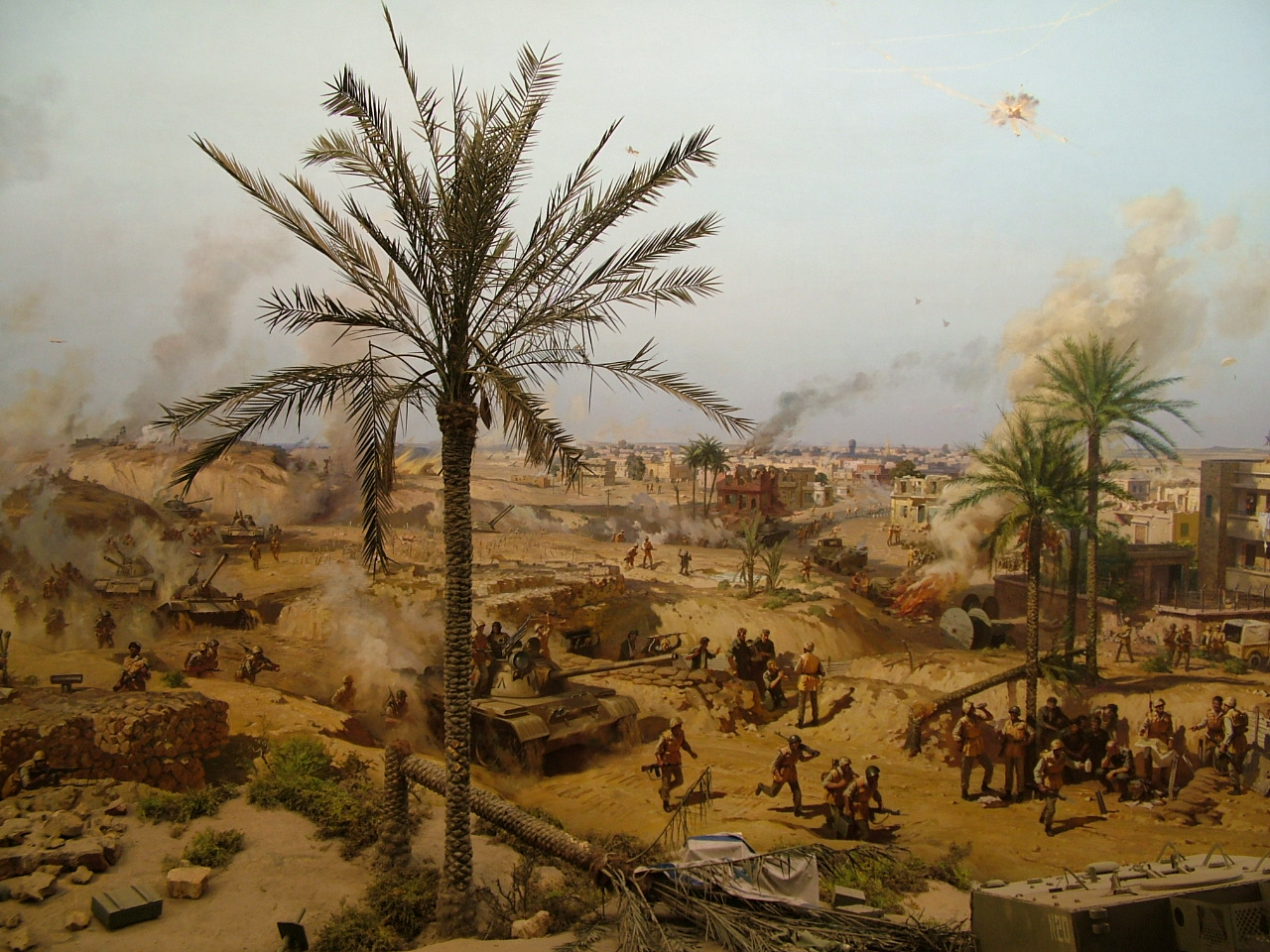

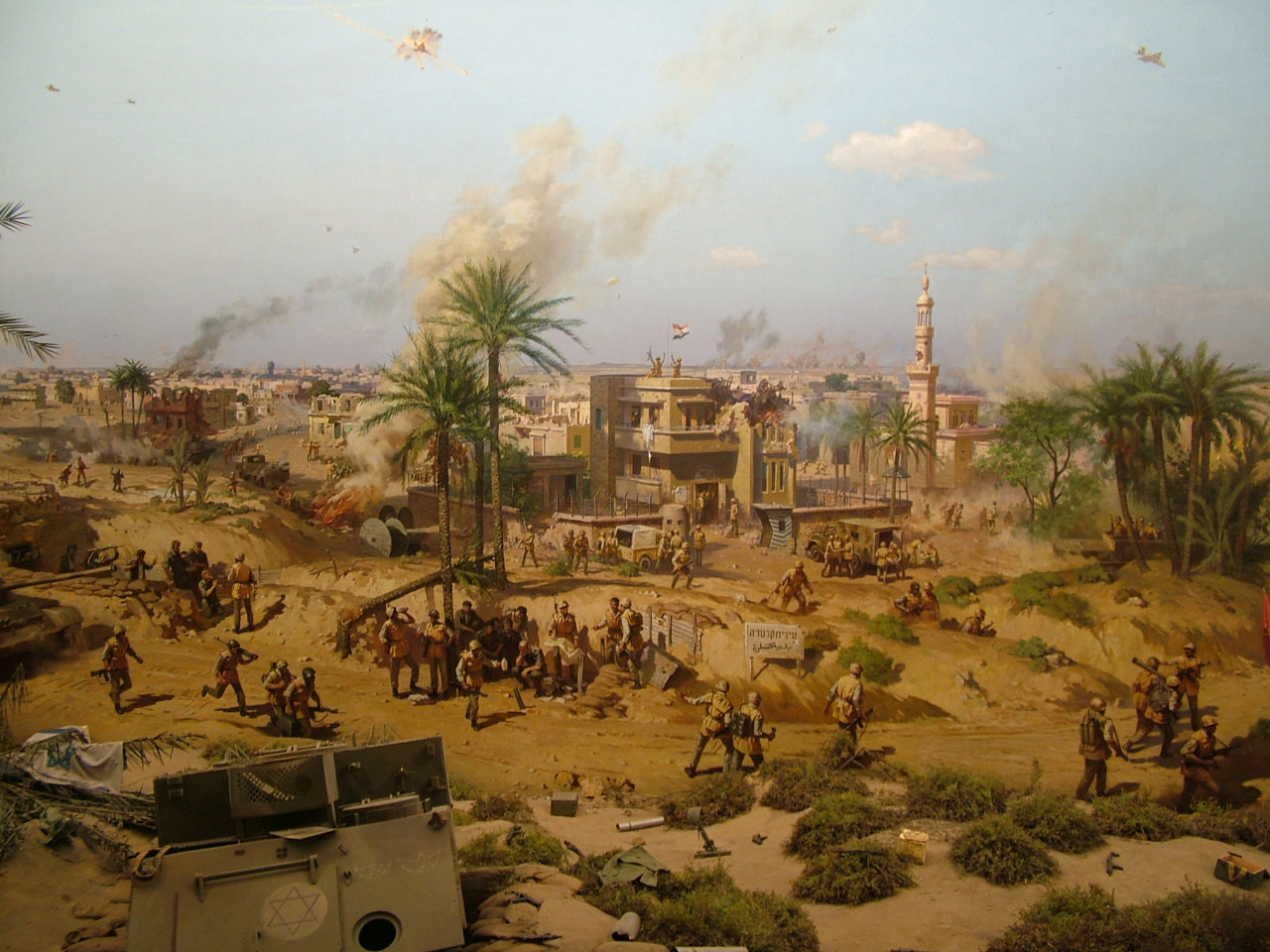

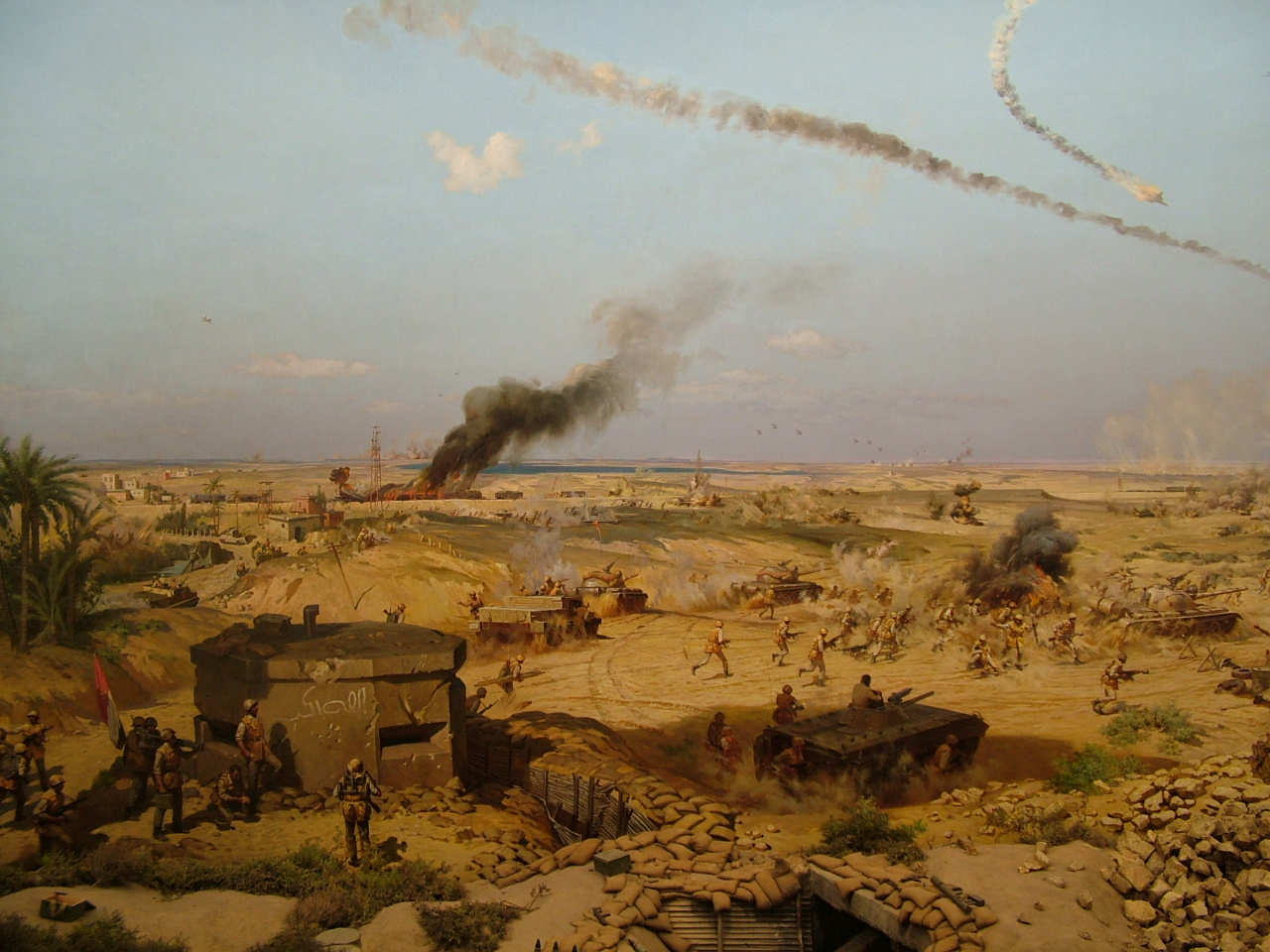

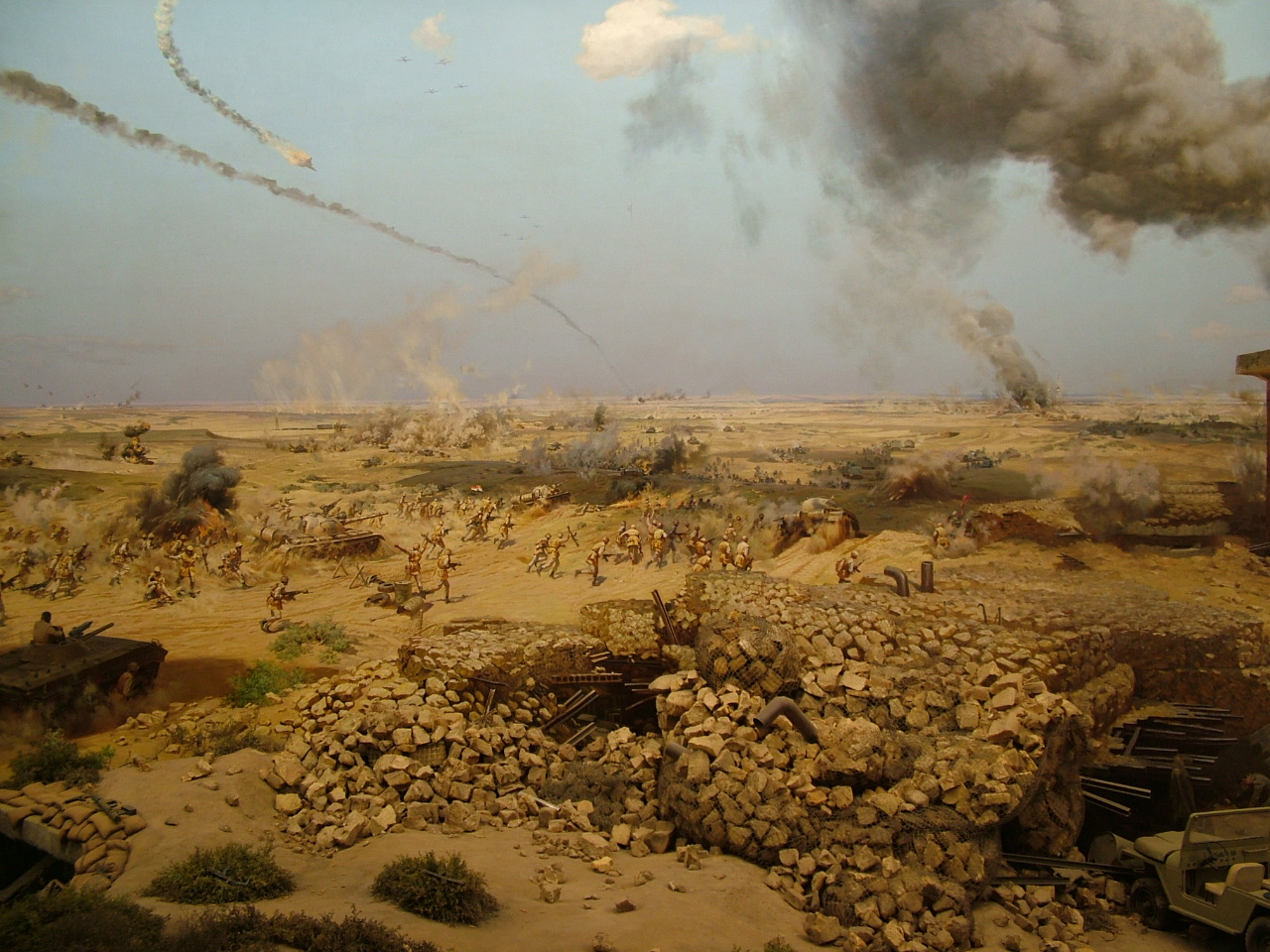

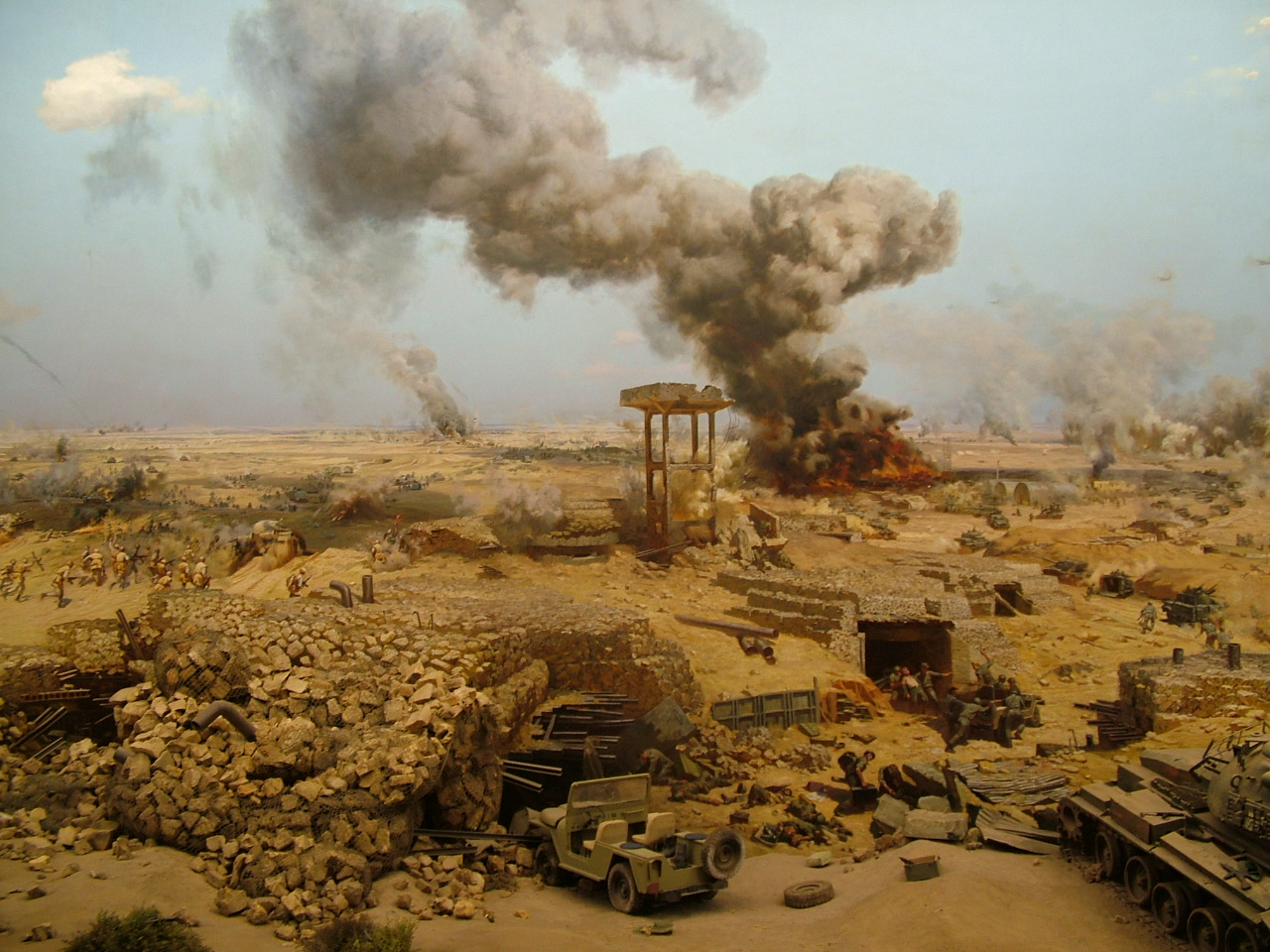

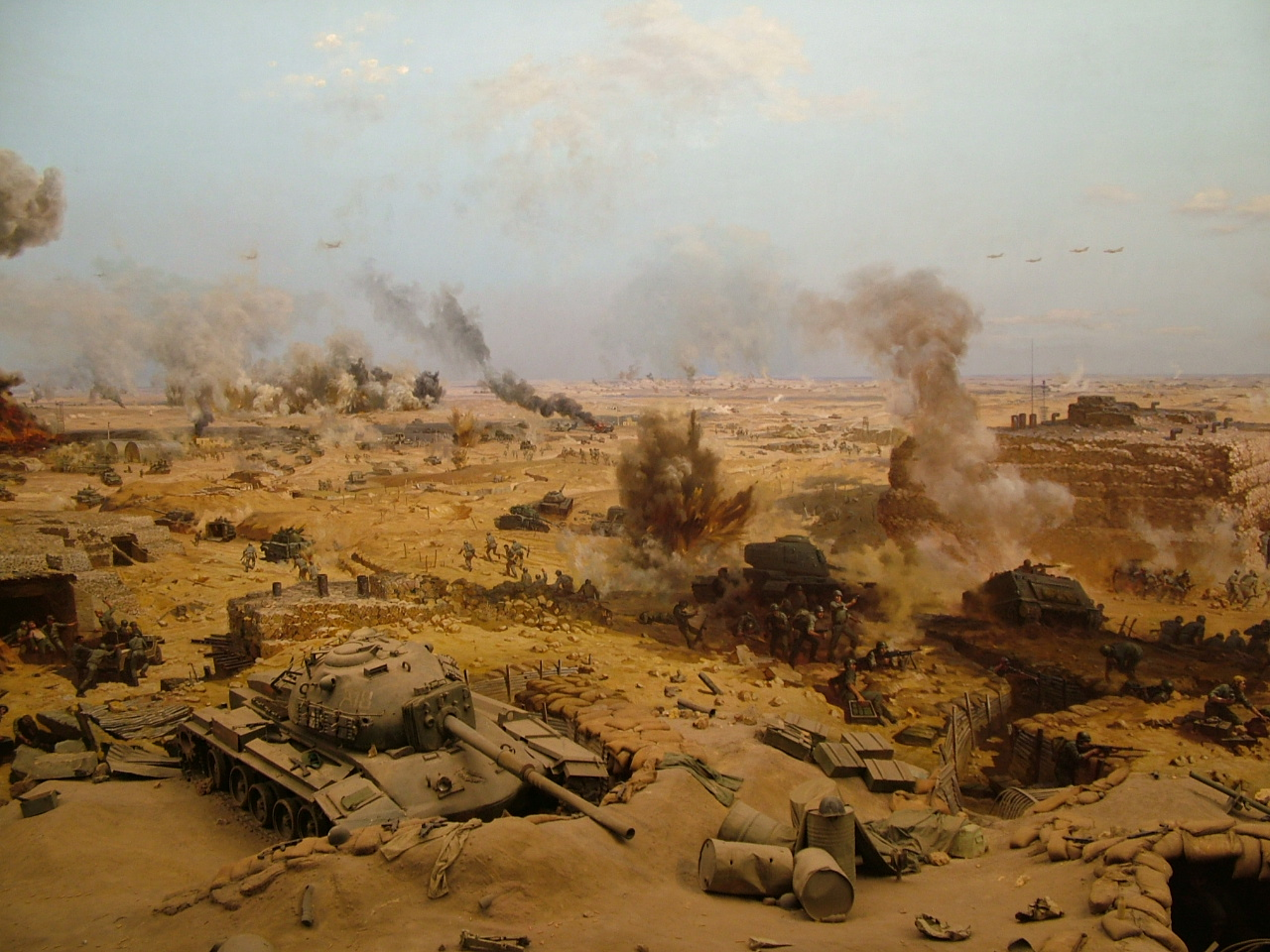

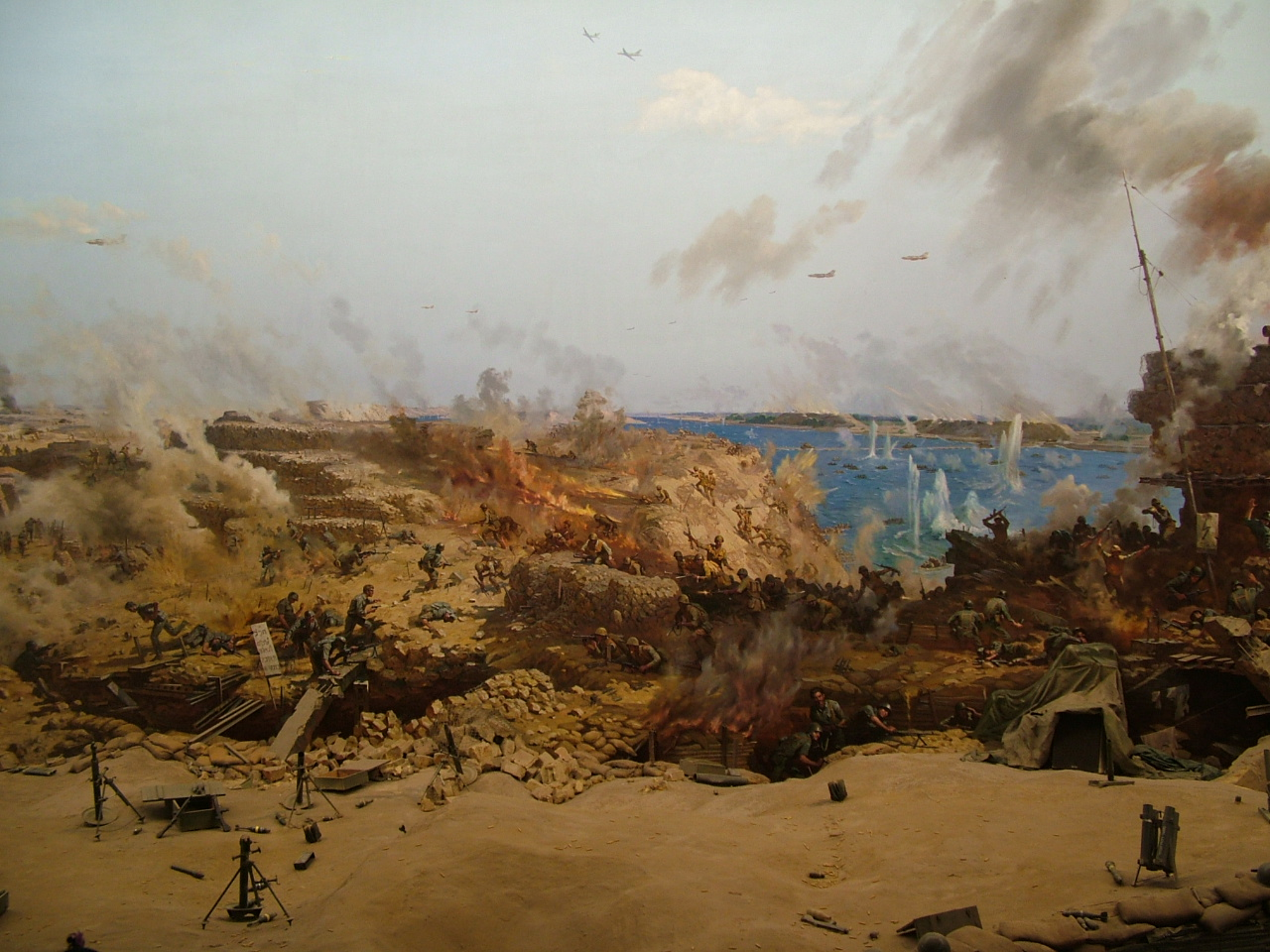

=== Waiting area ===
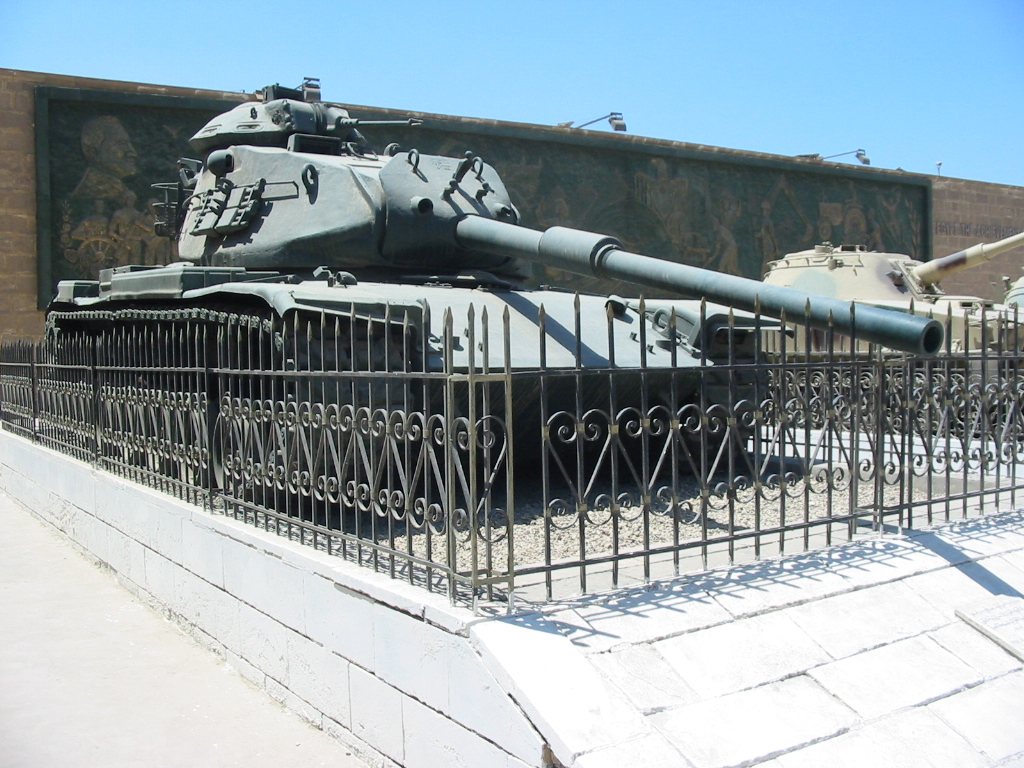
Israeli M60 tank captured by the Egyptian army

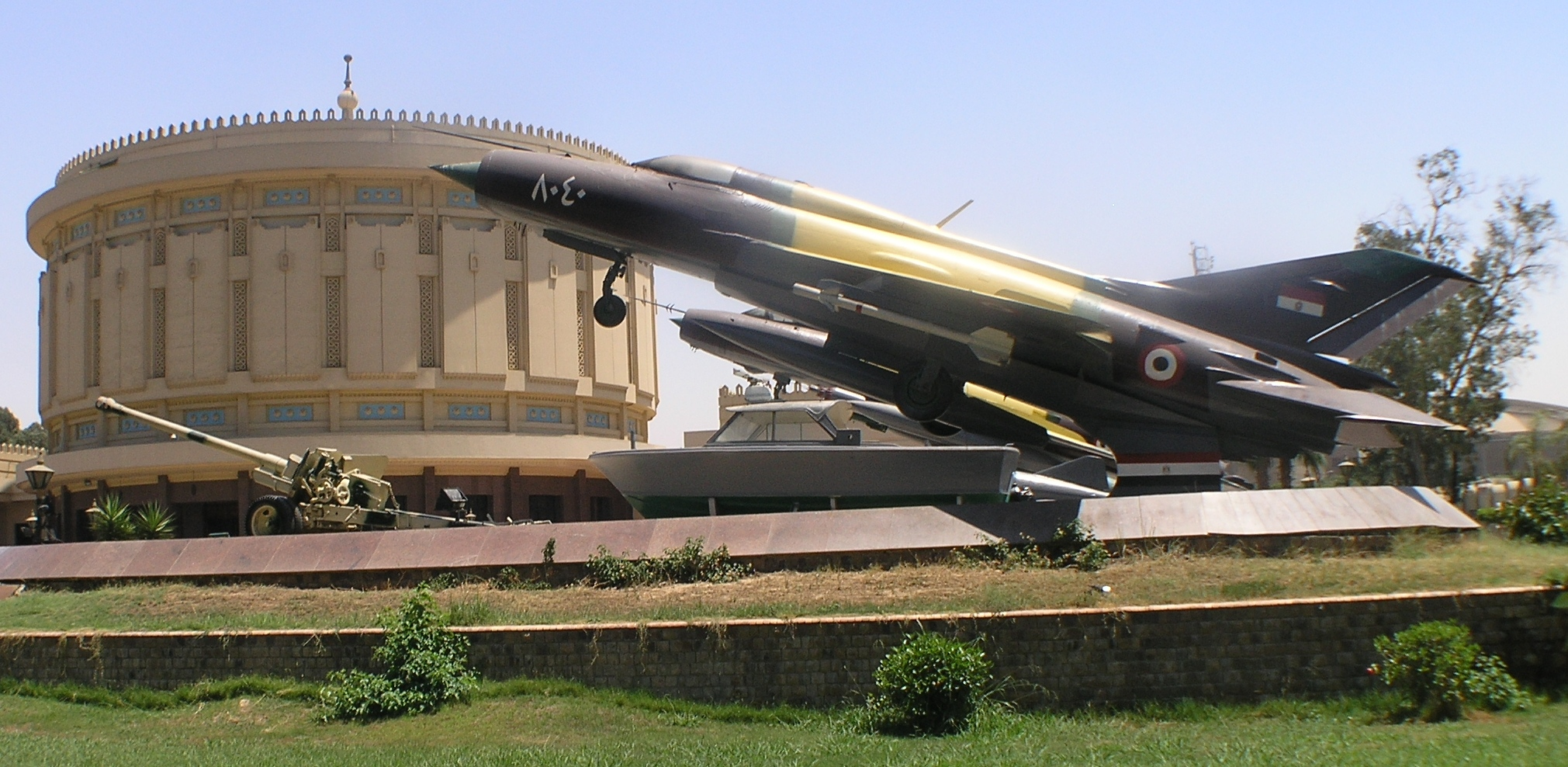
Egyptian Air Force MiG-21

The visitors are directed to a waiting area until the Panorama is open. The waiting area is an outdoor area with food kiosks and vendors which sell souvenirs.

=== Outdoors display ===
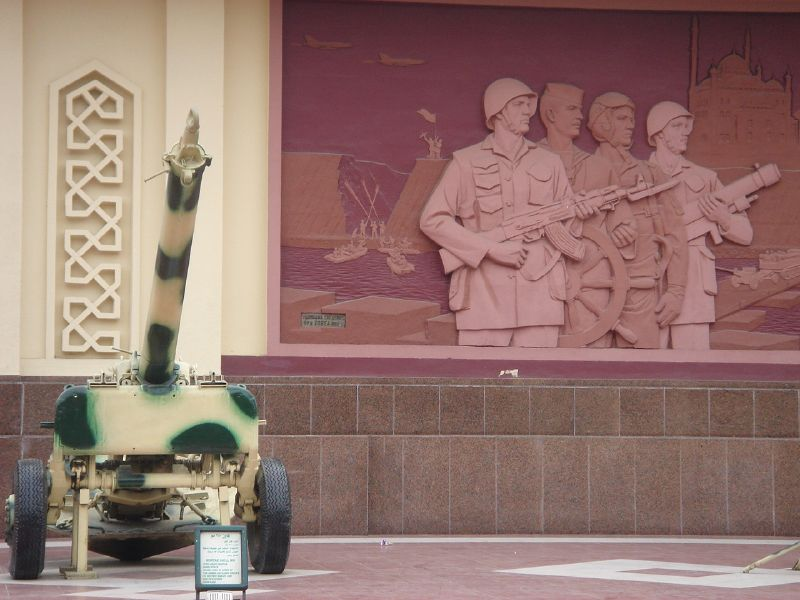
Mural of Egyptian army and cannon at the Panorama

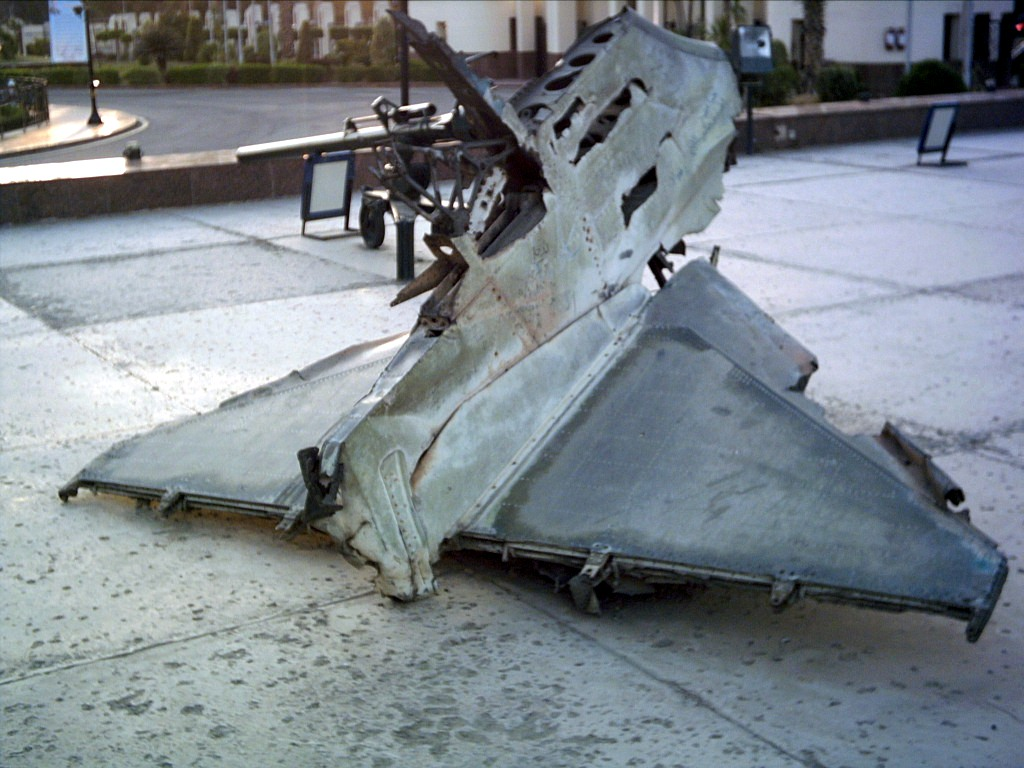
Wreckage of Israeli A-4 Skyhawk

The spacious outdoors display area lies across from the Panorama building. In it are shown military vehicles that were used in the war. These include tanks, aircraft and weaponry that belonged to both Egypt and Israel. The panorama itself also contains many weapons, models and reliefs showing the course of war.

=== First hall ===
The show, a 15-minute documentary on the war starts in the first hall. The film was made in the 1990s. Narration is in 11 languages.

=== Second hall ===
Visitors sit on a rotating platform to view a 360 degree war film featuring Egyptian soldiers storming the Bar-Lev Line on the Suez Canal, which is documented on a huge mural. There are also 3D figures on the wall while a narrator describes the war. The narration is in Arabic only.

== See also ==
- Egyptian Military museum
- October War Panorama (Damascus, Syria)
