= Hasan Şerefli =

Hasan Şerefli, a native of Turkey, won a national Emmy in 2003. This award, won with eight other researchers, was given in the category of "Outstanding Individual Achievement in a Craft: Research" for work on the "Kids Behind Bars" documentary.

On September 16, Şerefli explained that:

The film, which was shot in the US, Mongolia, Georgia, India, the Philippines and Turkey, shows the conditions of reformatories in all of these countries. It relates the reactions of children and how the world is seen from a child's point of view, the conditions they live in, how the state helps and the difficulties they are faced with in adapting to social life after coming out of the reformatory.

He detailed that the reason for his absence at the awards was because he did not think that his movie was going to win an Emmy.
