= Khasan Bakayev =

Russian historian (1959–2025)

- Хьасан Бакаев
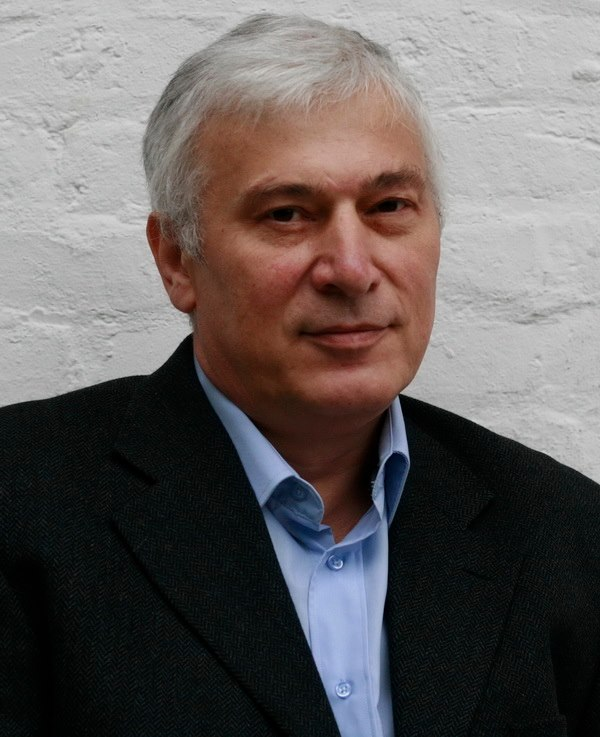
- Born: 8 February 1959; Gehi, Urus-Martan District, Chechen-Ingush ASSR, Russian SFSR, USSR
- Died: 7 March 2025 (aged 66); Belgium
- Occupations: Historian, writer, poet and essayist

Khasan Zayndinovich Bakayev (Chechen: Зайндин кӀант Бакаев Хьасан; 8 February 1959 – 7 March 2025) was a Russian historian of the Chechen Republic. The Chechen–Russian conflict in 1994–2001 contributed to his inability to obtain his doctoral degree at a Russian university in St. Petersburg. Bakayev transitioned from a scholar to a dissident. Nevertheless, Bakayev managed to publish hundreds of articles in newspapers and magazines. His books were widely known in Chechnya and recognized by the scientific community.

== Life and career ==
In 1976, Khasan Bakayev graduated from the High School No 1 in Gekhi, Chechen Republic. From 1977 to 1979, he served in the Soviet army, which was a mandatory duty for youngsters. From 1983 to 1988, he studied history at the Chechen-Ingush State University and received his master's degree. In the last two years of his university studies, Bakayev began to specialize in studying the History of the Ancient East. As a student, he published around 40 scientific articles related to Vainakh (Chechen and Ingush) ethnogenesis. In the same period of time, Kh. Bakayev was actively involved in archaeological excavations in the former Chechen-Ingush Republic.

In 1987, Kh. Bakayev was recognized as the best scientifically oriented student for his achievements in the regional archaeological conferences and, as a result, he was sent to Moscow to participate in the XXII All-Union student archeological conference, where Khasan was awarded a diploma of the winner of the first degree. And in the same year, Bakayev was invited to participate at the top level All-Union Scientific Conference titled "Caucasus and civilizations of the Ancient East", in Vladikavkaz, Russia. This opportunity allowed him to contact and even debate with many scientists like I.M. Dyakonov, G.A. Melikishvili, Viacheslav Vsev. Ivanov, O.M. Japaridze, S.A. Starostin, A.Y. Militarёv, etc.

From 1988 to 1990, after completing his studies at the university, Bakayev was engaged in archaeology at the professional level. During these years, he published a number of scientific papers and essays that identified the ethnic and cultural ties of the Vainakh peoples with the Ancient East.

In 1990, Bakayev received an opportunity to study at the graduate school of Oriental Studies of St. Petersburg University under the leadership of famous Oriental scientists such as I.M. Dyakonov and B.B. Piotrowski. His topic of doctoral degree was the ancient Hurro-Urartian civilization, which existed from 2300 BC until 590 BC, and its ethno-cultural ties with the origin of the Chechens. At the same time, along with Dr. Rostunov, H. Bakaev was developing a theory of the Indo-European nature of the Kura–Araxes archeological culture (3400 BC - 2000 BC). During this period of time (1990–1992), Bakayev managed to publish a number of scientific reports in Moscow and St. Petersburg based academic magazines.

In 1992, Kh. Bakayev's scientific career was interrupted due to the complicated political circumstances related to the Chechen–Russian conflict. Instead of continuing his academic career, he became a journalist specializing in human rights and ethnic identity.

For this purpose, Bakayev published articles in the "Ichkeria" (“Ичкерия”) newspaper, the official daily gazette of the Chechen Republic of Ichkeria. In 1995, he became the Chief Editor of this newspaper. In November 1996, when the First Russo-Chechen war was over, Kh. Bakayev founded another private newspaper named “The Chechen” (“Чеченец”) to focus on the historical roots of the origin of the Chechens and their historical ties with other ancient and presently existing peoples.

Meanwhile, Chechen-Russian conflict increased. Bakayev made make several trips to Baku, Azerbaijan, to prepare an alternative newspaper office there. The second Russo-Chechen war found Bakayev in Baku. He stayed in Azerbaijan for a time. However, in a few years, Bakayev immigrated to Western Europe, where he lived until his death. Bakayev resumed his scientific work and journalism. In his last several years he published a few books related to Chechen (Vainakh) ethnic history.

On 6–7 March 2015, the Chechen Government in exile invited Bakayev to participate in the International Conference in Brussels, Belgium. Immediately prior to the conference, Bakayev published a book titled "The Forever War: Chechens through eyes of friends and enemies.” On behalf of the government and the Chechen people, Ahmed Zakaev, the Prime-Minister of the Chechen Government, awarded Khasan Bakayev "Qoman Si" (Honor of the Nation), the highest National Order of Merit, with the wording:

"For The Selfless Service For The Motherland. For The Selfless Work On The Information Front. And For The Long And Fruitful Scientific Work For The Chechen People.”

Bakayev died in Belgium on 7 March 2025, at the age of 66.(confirmed by his family)
