= Hassan (surname) =

Origin
- Origin: Arabic, Irish, Scottish, Jewish
- Meaning: Arabic: "handsome", "good", "manly", "strong", "benefactor"; Irish and Scottish: "descendant of Osáin"; Jewish: used as a spelling variant of Hazzan "cantor"
- Region of origin: Arabic, Irish, Scottish, Jewish

Hassan or Hasan is an Arabic, Irish, Scottish, or Jewish (Sephardic and Mizrahic) surname.

== Etymology and spelling ==
There are several unrelated origins for this surname:

- In Arabic, Hassan is a transliteration of two names that both derive from the Arabic language triconsonantal root Ḥ-S-N (ح-س-ن): Ḥasan (حَسَن), which means "good", "handsome", "excellent", or "favorable"; and Ḥassān (حَسَّان), which means "benefactor".
- In Ireland/Scotland, the surname Hassan is one of the anglicized forms of the Gaelic (Irish/Scottish) form of Ó hOsáin. It is to be distinguished from Ó hOisín and Ó hOiseáin (Hession and Hishon). In County Londonderry, where it is numerous, it is spelt Hassan, Hassen, Hasson, Hassin and Hessin. In the Monaghan Hearth Money Rolls of 1663, it appears as O'Hassan. There was a Hasson of Wexford among the "principal gentlemen" of that county in 1598, but that family was no doubt of non-Gaelic stock, and a John Hassan was an influential merchant in Wexford fifty years earlier. Another derivation is from "Hal's son".
- In Israel and among Sephardi and Mizrahi Jews, the surname Hassan (חסן) is derived as a spelling variant of Hazzan ("cantor") and therefore most likely represents an alteration of this term through Judaeo-Spanish or Judeo-Arabic. Hassan is normally an Arab first or last name; but, in the Jewish Sephardic – Mizrahi traditions, it is a Jewish surname. The Jewish surname Hassan or Hasson (see also Hassoun), appear to have most likely originated from Spain, from where the Jewish family has initially settled in Morocco and in Livorno, Italy, following 1492 expulsion of the Jews from Spain, and afterwards following the 16th century has spread throughout the Ottoman Empire (notably to Thessaloniki, Greece; Istanbul, Turkey; in 1592 in Sidon, Lebanon; Damascus, Syria; Constantine, Algeria and Tunis, Tunisia).

Depending on language and region, spelling variations

Hassan is a surname of many independent linguistic and regional origins, including Arabic (and through the influence of Arabic, languages spoken by Muslims such as Persian, Kurdish, Urdu, Indonesian, Malaysian, Turkish, Uyghur, Turkmen, Somali, Swahili, Berber, Azerbaijani, Crimean Tatar, Tatar, Bosnian, Albanian, Bengali, etc.), as well as Irish, Scottish, and Jewish.

Therefore, depending on language and region, spelling variations include Hasan, Hassen, Hasson, Hassin, Hassine, Hacen, Hasen, Hasin, Hassa, Hasa, Cassin, Chasan, Chasson, Chason, Khasshan, Khasan, Casan, Case, Hasso, Hassanein, Hasnen, Hess, Hasani, Alhassan (Alhassani), Al-Hassan (Al-Hassani), Lassana, Alassane, Lacen, Lasanah, Assan, Asan, Asanov/Asanova, Hasanov/Hasanova, Klassen, Khasanova, Hasanoff, Jasanoff, Hasanović, Hasanovic, Asanović, Hasanovich, Hasanovski/Hasanovska, Asanovski/Asanovska, O'Hassan, or Haasan (Haasaan, Hasaan).

List of variant spellings

- In Arabic transcription: حسن (Ḥasan), حسان (Ḥassān),
- In Urdu: حسن (Hasan)
- In Hebrew transcription: חסן (Hasan or Hassan)
- In Turkish: Hasan, Asan, Hasanoglu, Asanoglu
- In Bosnian: Hasanović, Asanović, Hasović
- In Albanian: Hasani or Hasan
- In Armenian: Hassanian or Hasanian
- In Azerbaijan: Həsən
- In Kurdish: Hesan
- In Kazakh: Asan or Äsem
- In Bengali transcription: হাসান (Hāsān)
- In Somali: Xasan
- In West Africa: Lassana, Alassane and Lacen, derived from al-Hassan.
- In Finland: Hasanen for Hassan, derived from the Arabic Hassan and the Finnish suffix for surnames -en.
- In French: Hassan, Hassen, Hasson or Hacen
- In Spanish: Hassan, Hassán, Hacen, Hacén, Jassan, Jassán, Jasan, Jasán, Hasson or Jasanoff
- In Russian transcription: Хасан, Хассан, Хассен, Хэссан, Гасан, Асан, Асанов/Хасанов (masculine), Асанова/Хасанова (feminine)
- In Croatian/Serbian/Montenegrin: Asanović, Hasanović, Hasović
- In China, some Muslims believe that their surname Ha (哈) is abbreviated from Arabic Hassan.

Popularity of the surname

- The popularity of the name Hassan or its variants Hasson, Hassen, Hassin is not only in the Arab world (including Arab Christians) but also in the Muslim world.
- The Irish last name Hassan or its variants Hasson, Hassen, Hassin is frequently found especially in the area of Derry in Northern Ireland and also everywhere where there is a sizable Irish diaspora like in the United States, Canada, Scotland, England, Australia and New Zealand.
- The frequency of the Jewish last name Hassan – or its variants Hasson, Hassen, Hassin – is mostly among Sephardic and Mizrahi Jews, used as a spelling variant of Hazzan.

== People ==
=== A ===
- Abbas Hassan (born 1985), Lebanese-born Swedish footballer
- Abd Al Naser Hasan (born 1990), Syrian footballer
- 'Abd al-Razzaq al-Hasani (1903–1997), Iraqi historian and politician
- Abdelhamid Hassan (born 1972), Egyptian footballer
- Abdelilah Mohammed Hassan (1934–2022), Iraqi football coach
- Abdelkarim Hassan (born 1993), Qatari footballer
- Abdi Yusuf Hassan (born 1953), Somali politician
- Abdi Shakur Sheikh Hassan (died 2011), Somali politician
- Abdiqasim Salad Hassan (born 1941), Somali politician – president of Somalia (2001–2004)
- Abdirahman Ali Hassan, Kenyan politician
- Abdirahman Mohamud Haji Hassan, Somali politician
- Abdul Hassan (lawyer) (born 1974), Guyanese-American lawyer
- Abdul Majid Hassan (1380–1408), Sultan of Brunei
- Abdul Naza Alhassan (born 1990), Ghanaian football player
- Abdullahi Mohammad Ahmad Hassan (1928–2022), Sudanese politician
- Abdulmumini M. Hassan, Nigerian politician
- Abdulqadir Hassan (born 1962), Emirati football figure, grandson of Ali
- Abdusalom Khasanov, Tajikistani boxer
- Abid Hasan (diplomat) (1911–1984), Indian military officer and diplomat
- Abrar Hasan (born 1935), Pakistani lawyer and constitutional expert
- Abu'l-Hasan (artist) (1589 – c. 1630), Indian painter
- Abu Hashim al-Hasan (before 1031–1040), Yemeni imam
- Abul Hasan (cricketer) (born 1992), Bangladeshi cricketer
- Abul Hasan (poet) (1947–1975), Bangladeshi poet and journalist
- Adlan Khasanov (1970–2004), Russian journalist and photographer
- Adnan Abu Hassan (composer) (1959–2016), Malaysian composer and musician
- Adnan Badr Hassan, Syrian security officer
- Aftab Hasan, Pakistani educationist and linguist
- Ahmad Ali Hasan (1916–2010), Syrian poet
- Ahmad Y. al-Hassan (1925–2012), historian of Arabic and Islamic science and technology
- Ahmed Hassan (footballer, born 1975), Egyptian footballer
- Ahmad Hassan (Syrian politician)
- Ahmed Hassanein (1889–1946), Egyptian courtier, diplomat and fencer
- Ahmed Issack Hassan (born 1970), Kenyan lawyer
- Ahmed M. Hassan, Somali politician
- Ahmed Mohamed Hassan (born 1945), Djiboutian politician
- Aitzaz Hasan (1998/1999–2014), Pakistani student who intercepted a suicide bomber at his school
- Aishath Himna Hassan (born 2002), Maldivian athlete
- Akram Hasson (born 1959), Druze Israeli politician
- Al-Mansur al-Hasan (1199–1271), Yemeni imam
- Al-Muntakhab al-Hasan (died 936), Yemeni imam
- Alberto Hassan (born c. 1942), Argentinian singer
- Ali Hasan (born 1965), Kuwaiti fencer
- Ali Hasan, Bahraini boy arrested for politically protesting at age 11, see Arrest of Ali Hasan
- Ali Hassan (actor) (born 1972), Indian television actor
- Ali Hassan (born 1996), known online as SypherPK, American Twitch streamer and YouTuber
- Ali Hasanov (born 1976), Azerbaijani artist, musician and filmmaker
- Ali M. Hasanov (born 1960), Azerbaijani professor and politician
- Ali S. Hasanov, Azerbaijani politician
- Ali Said Hassan, Somali filmmaker
- Aliagha Hasanov (1871–1933), Azerbaijani statesman
- Aljoša Asanović (born 1965), Croatian footballer
- Aly Hassan (born 1989), American soccer player
- Amadou Alassane (born 1983), French born Mauritanian football player
- Amir Hasan (14th century), Chupanid prince of the Ilkhanate
- Amir Alexander Hasson, entrepreneur
- Amira Hass (born 1956), Israeli journalist and author
- Amira Hess, Israeli poet and artist
- Ammar Hassan (born 1976), Palestinian singer – placed second in Super Star 2
- An-Nasir al-Hasan (1457–1523), Yemeni imam
- Anjum Hasan, Indian poet and novelist
- Anna Hassan, British educator
- Anne Cassin, Irish journalist and news presenter
- Anthony Lacen (1950–2004), American jazz tubaist and band leader
- Antonio Asanović (1991), Croatian footballer
- Anu Hasan (born 1970), Indian actress and TV anchor in the Tamil language
- Arif Hasan, Pakistani architect, planner, teacher, social researcher and writer
- Arshad Hasan (born 1980), American political organizer
- Asher Hassin (1918–1995), Israeli politician
- Asim Hassan (born 1986), Indian football player
- Asma Gull Hasan, Pakistani-American writer and attorney
- Awang Hassan (1910–1998), Malaysian politician

=== B ===
- Barbara Cassin (born 1947), French philologist and philosopher
- Baruch Hassan (born 1959), Israeli footballer and manager
- Basher Hassan (born 1944), Kenyan cricketer
- Basma Hassan (born 1976), Egyptian actress
- Bilal Hassani (born 1999), French singer
- Bob Hasan (1931–2020), Indonesian businessman and politician

=== C ===
- Callum Hassan (born 1993), English footballer
- Che Hisamuddin Hassan (born 1972), Malaysian football player
- Chiara Cassin (born 1978), Italian synchronized swimmer

=== D ===
- Daisy Hasan, Indian-English author and teacher
- David Ben Hassin (1727–1792), Moroccan Jewish poet
- David Hassan (born 1972), Northern Irish academic, writer, and current Professor of Sport Policy and Management at the University of Ulster
- Dinara Asanova (1942–1985), a Soviet film director

=== E ===
- Edon Hasani (born 1992), Albanian footballer
- Emilio Hassan (born 1977), Mexican soccer player
- Enver Hasani, Kosovar Albanian academic, university rector and judge
- Eric Hass (1905–1980), American politician
- Esther Hasson (1867–1942), American military nurse

=== F ===
- Faeq Hassan (1914–1992), Iraqi painter
- Faiq Hasanov (born 1938), Azerbaijani chess arbiter, coach and television presenter
- Fairoz Hasan (born 1988), Singaporean footballer
- Faisal Ali Hassan (born 1981), Emarati footballer
- Faizul Hasan, Bangladeshi politician
- Falah Hassan (born 1951), Iraqi football player
- Farkhonda Hassan (1930–2020), Egyptian professor of geology
- Farris Hassan (born 1989), American student journalist who, at age 16, went to Iraq without parental consent
- Fathi Hassan (born 1957), Egyptian-Italian artist
- Fatimah bint al-Hasan (7th century), Islamic historical figure, daughter of Hasan ibn Ali
- Fekri Hassan, geoarchaeologist
- Ferhan Hasani (born 1990), Macedonian footballer
- Fleur Hassan-Nahoum (born September 27, 1973), Israeli politician and policy maker
- Frank T. Hassa (1873 – after 1902), American politician from Wisconsin
- Fred Hassan (born 1946), Pakistani-American business executive
- Frederick Hassan (1859–1940), Egyptian-born English cricketer
- Fuad Hassan (1929–2007), Indonesian politician

=== G ===
- Galit Hasan-Rokem (born 1945), Israeli professor of folklore
- Gayratjon Hasanov (born 1983), Uzbek footballer
- Gemma Hasson, Northern Irish folk singer
- Gene Hasson (1915–2003), American baseball player
- Gerry Hassan (born 1964), Scottish writer and academic
- George Alhassan or Jair (born c. 1954), Ghanaian footballer
- George Alhassan (footballer, born 1941) (1941–2013), Ghanaian football player
- Ghada Hassine (born 1993), Tunisian weightlifter
- Ghanem Ibrahim al-Hassan (died 2011), Syrian military officer
- Gholamreza Hassani (1927–2018), Iranian imam
- Gotfrid Hasanov (1900–1965), Russian composer
- Guillermo Martínez Casañ (born 1955), Spanish politician
- Guy Hasson, Israeli playwright, film maker and science fiction writer

=== H ===
- Hajim al-Hassani (born 1954), Iraqi politician
- Hamedah Hasan, American subject of a documentary
- Hameed Hassan (born 1987), Afghan cricketer
- Hamdi Hassan (1956–2021), Egyptian politician
- Hanan Qassab Hassan (born 1952), Syrian writer and academic
- Hani al-Hassan (1939–2012), Palestinian politician
- Hans Hass (1919–2013), Austrian underwater diver
- Harry Hasso (1904–1984), German filmmaker
- Hasan Hasanov (born 1940), Azerbaijani politician and diplomat
- Haseeb-ul-Hasan (1964–1990), Pakistani cricketer and murder victim
- Hashim Khamis Hassan, Iraqi football player
- Hassan Abdallah Hassan, Somali politician
- Hassan Aziz Hassan (1924–2000), Egyptian prince of the Muhammad Ali dynasty
- Hassan Mohamed Hassan (1906–1990), Egyptian artist
- Hassan Hassanein (1916–1957), Egyptian golfer
- Hayder Hassan, UFC Fighter
- Hieronymus Albrecht Hass (1689–1752), German harpsichord and clavichord maker
- Hossam Hassan (born 1966), Egyptian footballer and coach
- Hossam Hassan (footballer, born 1989), Egyptian footballer
- Hossam Hassan (footballer, born 1993), Egyptian footballer
- Houssein Omar Hassan (born 1977), Djiboutian athlete
- Hussein Hasan, Somali poet and warrior
- Hussein Hajj Hassan (born 1960), Lebanese politician

=== I ===
- Ibragim Khasanov (1937–2010), Soviet sprint canoer
- Ibrahem Al-Hasan (born 1986), Kuwaiti table tennis player
- Ibrahim Hassan (born 1966), Egyptian footballer
- Ibrahim Hassan (athlete) (born 1971), Ghanaian runner
- Ibrahim Al Hasan, Syrian football player
- Ihab Hassan (1925–2015), American literary theorist
- Iliass Bel Hassani (born 1992), Dutch footballer
- Irwin Hasen (1918–2015), American cartoonist
- Isaac Cleto Hassan, South Sudanese physician and politician
- Ismaël Alassane (born 1984), Nigerien footballer
- Ismail Ahmed Kadar Hassan (born 1987), Djiboutian-French footballer

=== J ===
- JP Hasson (born 1977), American musician, comedian and writer
- Jabrayil Hasanov (born 1990), Azerbaijani freestyle wrestler
- Jack Cassin (1915–1994), Australian Australian rules footballer
- Jacob Hassan (1936–2006), Spanish academic, writer, and university Professor in Universidad Complutense de Madrid of Jewish descent
- Jakob Meyer zum Hasen (1482–1531), bürgermeister of the city of Basel and patron
- Jalal Hassan (born 1991), Iraqi football player
- Jalaluddin Hasan, 25th Nizāri Ismā‘ilī Imām
- Jalaluddin Hassan (born 1954), Malaysian actor and television host
- James Hasson (born 1992), Australian professional rugby league player
- Jamil Hassan (died 2012), Syrian military officer
- Jan Alam Hassani (born 1956), Afghan volleyball player
- Jared Hassin (born 1989), American football player
- Jasur Hasanov (footballer, born 1983), Uzbek football player
- Jasur Hasanov (footballer, born 1989), Uzbek football player
- Jay Jasanoff (born 1942), American linguist and Indo-Europeans
- John Cassin (1813–1869), American ornithologist
- John Cassin (footballer) (born 1951), Australian Australian rules footballer
- Joshua Hassan (1915–1997), Gibraltarian politician of Jewish descent – chief minister for 17 years

=== K ===
- Kalif Alhassan (born 1990), Ghanaian footballer
- Kamal Haasan (born 1954), Indian actor, screenwriter, producer and director
- Kamarulzaman Hassan (born 1979), Malaysian footballer
- Karam Hasanov (born 1969), Azerbaijani politician
- Karen Hassan (born 1981), Northern Irish actress
- Karim Alhassan (born 1991), Ghanaian footballer
- Kazem Hasan (born 1961), Kuwaiti fencer
- Kevin Hasson, American attorney focused on religious liberty issues
- Khaled al-Hassan (1928–1994), Palestinian politician and founder of Fatah
- Khalid Hasan (c. 1935–2009), Pakistani journalist and writer
- Khalid Hasan (cricketer) (1937–2013), Pakistani cricketer
- Khalid Hassan (died 2007), Iraqi interpreter and reporter
- Kobi Hassan (born 1978), Israeli football player
- Krste Asanović, computer engineer
- Kumaran Asan (1873–1924), Indian poet in the Malayalam language

=== L ===
- Lama Hasan, British journalist
- Leila Hassan (born 1948), British editor and activist
- Lina Hawyani al-Hasan (born 1975), Syrian novelist, journalist and writer

=== M ===
- M. M. Hassan (born 1947), Indian politician
- M. M. S. Abul Hassan, Indian politician
- Maddie Hasson (born 1995), American actress
- Maggie Hassan (born 1958), American politician and Senator from New Hampshire
- Maha Hassan, Syrian-Kurdish journalist and novelist
- Mahmoud Hassan (wrestler) (1918–1998), Egyptian Greco-Roman wrestler
- Mahmud al-Hasan (1851–1920), Indian religious scholar
- Mahmudul Hasan (general) (1936–2025), Bangladeshi major general and politician
- Mahmudul Hasan (cricketer, born 1990), Bangladeshi cricketer
- Mahmudul Hasan (cricketer, born 1994), Bangladeshi cricketer
- Malik Dohan al-Hassan (1919–2021), Iraqi politician
- Mamoun Hassan, Saudi Arabian-British screenwriter, director, editor, producer and teacher
- Manor Hassan (born 1979), Israeli football player
- Mansour Hassan (1937–2012), Egyptian politician
- Margaret Hassan (1945–2004), Irish aid worker murdered in Iraq
- Maria Hassan (born 1952), Swedish politician
- Mariam Hasan (born 1985), Pakistani cricketer
- Mariem Hassan (1958–2015), Sahrawi singer and lyricist
- Mark Chasan, entrepreneur, investment banker, lawyer and digital media pioneer
- Marlene Hassan-Nahon (born 1976), Gibraltarian historian and journalist
- Masahudu Alhassan (born 1992), Ghanaian footballer
- Masuma Hasan, Pakistani scholar and politician
- Maurice Hasson (born 1934), French-Venezuelan violinist
- Maxine Cassin (1927–2010), American poet, editor and publisher
- Mehdi Lacen (born 1984), Algerian footballer
- Mehdi Hasan, British journalist
- Mehdi Hassan (1927–2012), Pakistani ghazal and playback singer
- Mehr Hassan, Asian-American actress, model and classical dancer
- Mekaal Hasan (born 1972), Pakistani musician and record producer
- Melissa Hasin (born 1954), American cellist
- Mirza Hasanović (born 1990), Bosnian footballer
- Mian Ijaz ul Hassan, Pakistani painter
- Michael Hasani (1913–1975), Israeli politician
- Mike Hass (born 1983), American football player
- Mir Emad Hassani (1554–1615), Persian calligrapher
- Mohamad Hasan (politician) (born 1956), Malaysian politician
- Mohamad Al Hasan (born 1988), Syrian football player
- Mohamed Hassani, Egyptian discus thrower
- Mohamed Alhousseini Alhassan (born 1978), Nigerien swimmer
- Mohamed H.A. Hassan (born 1947), Sudanese scientist
- Mohammad Hasan Rahmani (died 2016), Afghan politician
- Mohammad Al Hajj Hassan (born 1976), Lebanese cleric
- Mohammad Ali Tabatabaei Hassani (1945–2017), Iraqi marja'
- Mohammed Abdullah Hassan (1856–1920), emir of Dervish state
- Mohammed Ali al-Hasani (died 2007), Iraqi politician
- Mohammed Alhassan (born 1984), Ghanaian footballer
- Mohammed Hassan Helmy (1912–1986), Egyptian footballer
- Mohammed Mohammed Hassen, Yemeni Guantanamo detainee
- Mohd Fareed Shah Hassan (born 1979), Malaysian footballer
- Mohd Hasmarul Fadzir Hassan (born 1986), Malaysian footballer
- Mohd Hasmawi Hassan (born 1980), Malaysian footballer
- Mohd Shoaib Hassan (born 1990), Pakistani squash player
- Mohd Sidek Hassan (born 1951), Malaysian politician
- Moinul Hassan, Indian politician
- Mona Hassanein (born 1985), Egyptian fencer
- Monazir Hassan (born 1957), Indian politician
- Moria Casán (born 1946), Argentine actress, television host and producer
- Mosaab Mahmoud Al Hassan (born 1983), Sudanese-Qatari footballer
- Mouad Hassan (born 1999), Djiboutian footballer
- Mouez Hassen (born 1995), French-Tunisian footballer
- Moulay Hassan, Crown Prince of Morocco (born 2003), Moroccan heir apparent to the throne
- Moulay Rachid ben al Hassan (born 1970), Moroccan prince and diplomat
- Moustapha Alassane (1942–2015), Nigerien filmmaker
- Mubashir Hassan (1922–2020), Pakistani civil engineer and science administrator
- Abu Uways Muhammad Abu Khubza al-Hassani (1932–2020), Moroccan cleric
- Muhammad Hasan (1902–unknown), Afghan prince
- Muhammad Hassan (Brunei) (reign 1582–1598 or 1601–1610), ninth Sultan of Brunei
- Muhammad Hassan (wrestler) (born 1981), American professional wrestler born Mark Copani
- Muhammad Hassanein, Egyptian government administrator
- Muhammad Sa'id Ali Hasan, person once on the FBI Seeking Information – War on Terrorism list
- Muhammad Nurridzuan Abu Hassan (born 1992), Malaysian footballer
- Muley Hacén or Abu l-Hasan Ali, Sultan of Granada (before 1464–1485), Iberian Peninsula ruler
- Munawwar Hasan (1964–2008), Indian politician
- Murat Khasanov (born 1970), Russian judoka
- Murtaza Hassan or Mastana (c. 1940/1941–2011), Pakistani comedian
- Musa Hassan (born 1952), Malaysian inspector-general of police
- Musa Bin Jaafar Bin Hassan, Omani diplomat and academic
- Mushirul Hasan (1949–2018), Indian historian, author and academic
- Mustafa Hassan (born 1990), Iraqi-Danish footballer
- Muzaffar Hassan (1920–2012), Pakistani naval officer
- Muzzammil Hassan (born 1964), Pakistani-American business executive and convicted murderer

=== N ===
- Naeem U. Hasan, Pakistani diplomat
- Najmul Hasan (born 1984), Bangladeshi qari (Qur'an reciter)
- Nataša Lačen (born 1971), Slovenian cross country skier
- Nazia Hassan (born 1965), Pakistani pop singer
- Nidal Hasan (born 1970), American mass murderer and terrorist who perpetrated the 2009 Fort Hood shooting
- Nihad Hasanović (born 1974), Bosnian writer and translator
- Norizam Ali Hassan (born 1976), Malaysian footballer
- Norman Hassan (born 1958), English musician of Yemeni and Welsh descent
- Numon Khasanov (born 1971), Uzbekistani football player
- Nurullah Hasan (1867 or 1870–1912), Turkish wrestler

=== O ===
- Olivier Cassan (born 1984), French football player
- Omar Hasan (born 1971), Argentine rugby union footballer
- Omar Hassan (skateboarder), American skateboarder
- Omar Said Al-Hassan, chairman of the Gulf Centre for Strategic Studies, London
- Ömer Asan (born 1961), Turkish folklorist, photographer and writer
- Osama Hassan (born 1979), Egyptian footballer

=== P ===
- Phil Hassan (born 1974), English rugby league and rugby union footballer

=== Q ===
- Qasim ibn Hasan (c. 666–680), Islamic historical figure, son of Hasan ibn Ali
- Qiwam al-Din Muhammad al-Hasani (17th century), Persian physician
- Quamrul Hassan (1921–1988), Bangladeshi artist
- Quazi Nurul Hasan Sohan (born 1993), Bangladeshi cricketer

=== R ===
- Radwan Al-Sheikh Hassan, Syrian football player
- Rahma Hassan (born 1988), Egyptian actress and model
- Rahma bint El Hassan (born 1969), Jordanian princess
- Raja Hasan (born 1979), Indian playback singer
- Ramiz Hasanov (born 1961), Azerbaijani politician
- Rana Naved-ul-Hasan (born 1978), Pakistani cricketer
- Raqibul Hasan (cricketer, born 1953), Bangladeshi cricketer
- Raqibul Hasan (cricketer, born 1987), Bangladeshi cricketer
- Rashid bin El-Hassan (born 1979), Jordanian prince
- Rauf Hassan (born 1945), Kurdish writer
- Ray Hass (born 1977), Australian swimmer
- Raya Haffar Al Hassan (born 1967), Lebanese finance minister
- Raza Hasan (born 1992), Pakistani cricketer
- René Cassin (1887–1976), French jurist, law professor and judge
- Rezal Hassan (born 1974), Singaporean football player
- Riaz Hassan, Australian sociologist and academic
- Ric Hassani, Nigerian singer songwriter
- Riccardo Cassin (1909–2009), Italian mountaineer, inventor and author
- Richard L. Hasen, American professor of Law
- Richard S. Hassan, American Air Force officer of Irish descent
- Ridzuan Fatah Hasan (born 1981), Singaporean soccer player
- Riffat Hassan (born 1943), Pakistani-American theologian
- Rilwan Olanrewaju Hassan (born 1991), Nigerian football player
- Rizik Zackaria Hassan, South Sudanese politician
- Rizwana Hasan (born 1968), Bangladeshi attorney and environmentalist
- Robert Hass (born 1941), American poet
- Robert Bernard Hass, American poet, literary critic and professor
- Rosa Yaseen Hasan (born 1974), Syrian writer
- Roy Hasson, Australian rugby league footballer
- Rudolph Hass (1892–1952), American developer of the Hass avocado
- Ruqaiya Hasan, Indian professor of linguistics
- Rushan Khasanov (born 1956), Russian football player

=== S ===
- S. Azmat Hassan, Pakistani ambassador
- Sahib Abbas Hassan, Iraqi football player
- Said Hasan, Fiji-Indian politician
- Saiyid Nurul Hasan, Indian historian and politician
- Sajid Hasan (born 1958), Pakistani actor
- Sajjadul Hasan (1978–2007), Bangladeshi cricketer
- Salim Al-Hassani, Iraqi-United Kingdom engineer and professor
- Samir Kadhim Hassan (born 1969), Iraqi football player
- Sardar Hasanov (born 1985), Azerbaijani weightlifter
- Sarvat Hasin (born 1991), British-Pakistani writer
- Sarvath El Hassan (born 1947), Pakistani princess – wife of the Prince of Jordan
- Seidu Al-Hassan, Ghanaian agricultural economist and university vice-chancellor
- Selim Hassan (1887–1961), Egyptian Egyptologist
- Selma Hassan, Eritrean politician
- Shahzaib Hasan (born 1989), Pakistani cricketer
- Shakib Al Hasan (born 1987), Bangladeshi cricketer
- Shada Hassoun (born 1981), Iraqi–Moroccan singer
- Sharaf ad-Din ibn al-Hasan (13th century), religious leader
- Sheila Jasanoff, American academic in the field of science and technology studies
- Shemsu Hassan (born 1968), Ethiopian racewalker
- Shpëtim Hasani (born 1982), Kosovar footballer
- Shruti Haasan (born 1986), Indian actress
- Sibte Hassan (1916–1986), Pakistani scholar, journalist and activist
- Sifan Hassan (born 1993), Ethiopian-Dutch runner
- Signe Hasso (1915–2002), Swedish-born American actress, writer and composer
- Sinan Hasani (1922–2010), Yugoslavian novelist and statesman – president of Yugoslavia
- Sreten Asanović (1931–2016), Yugoslav and Montenegrin author
- Steven Hassan (born 1954), American mental health counselor of Jewish descent
- Suhardi Hassan (born 1982), Malaysian racing cyclist
- Sulayman bin Hassan (16th century), Da'i-ul-Mutlaq of the Sulaymanis
- Sumaya bint El Hassan (born 1971), Jordanian princess
- Susanna Al-Hassan, Ghanaian politician
- Syed Ali Hasan (before 1902–1962), Indian cricketer and police official
- Syed Hamidul Hasan, Indian ayatullah
- Syed Mir Hassan (1844–1929), Indian scholar of the Qur'an, Hadith, Sufism and Arabic
- Syed Munawar Hasan (1941–2020), Pakistani politician
- Syed Shamsul Hasan (1885–1981), Pakistani politician
- Syed Wazir Hasan (1874–1947), Indian jurist and politician
- Syed Zafarul Hasan (1885–1949), Pakistani philosopher

=== T ===
- T. J. Hassan (born 1981), American actor and musician of North African descent
- Tabriz Hasanov, Azerbaijani footballer
- Taim Hasan (born 1976), Syrian actor
- Taj al-Din al-Hasani (1885–1943), Syrian leader and politician
- Talha ibn Hasan (7th century), imam
- Tamer Hassan (born 1968), British actor of Turkish Cypriot descent
- Tammam Hassan (1918–2011), Egyptian expert in Arabic linguistics
- Tarek Ali Hassan (born 1937), Egyptian professor, physician, composer, musician, painter and philosopher
- Tariq Hassan (born 1983), Emirati footballer
- Tengku Hazman Raja Hassan (born 1977), Malaysian footballer
- Teuku Muhammad Hasan (1906–1997), Indonesian politician – governor of Sumatra
- Thomas Hassan, American educational administrator of Irish descent
- Toni Hassan (born 1972), Australian writer and journalist

=== U ===
- Ulubatlı Hasan (1428–1453), Ottoman soldier
- Umar Hassan, Eritrean military officer
- Umar Bin Hassan (born 1948), American poet
- Usama Hasan, British scientist and cleric
- Uzun Hassan (1423–1478), sultan of the Aq Qoyunlu dynasty, or White Sheep Turkmen

=== V ===
- Victor Hassan, Israeli football player
- Victor Hassine (1956–2008), American prisoner and author
- Victor Hasson (1957–2005), Burundian entrepreneur
- Victorian of Asan (died c. 560), Spanish saint

=== W ===
- Wajid Shamsul Hasan, Pakistani diplomat
- Walid Hassan (comedian) (c. 1959–2006), Iraqi comedian
- Walter Hass (c. 1911–1987), American football coach and athletic director
- Walter Hassan (1905–1996), British automobile engineer of Irish descent
- Wan Jamak Wan Hassan (born 1957), Malaysian footballer and coach
- Waqar Hasan (1932–2020), Pakistani cricketer
- Wissam al-Hassan (1965–2012), Lebanese military officer

=== X ===
- Xhem Hasa (1908–1945), Albanian soldier

=== Y ===
- Yaël Hassan (born 1952), French-Israeli author
- Yarin Hassan (born 1994), Israeli footballer
- Yaron Hasson, Israeli guitar player
- Yisrael Hasson (born 1955), Israeli politician
- Yoel Hasson (born 1972), Israeli politician
- Yousif Hassan, Emirati footballer

=== Z ===
- Zahid Hasan (actor), Bangladeshi actor
- Zahid Hasan (scholar), Indian Islamic scholar
- Zainal Abidin Hassan (born 1963), Malaysian footballer and manager
- Zakir Hasan (cricketer, born 1972), Bangladeshi cricketer
- Zohaib Hassan (born 1966), Pakistani pop icon
- Zoya Hasan, Indian academic and political scientist
- Zulkifli Hasan (born 1962), Indonesian politician

== Fictional characters ==
- Dr. Lily Hassan, character in the British soap opera Doctors
- Hassani (Sleeper Cell character), character in the American television series Sleeper Cell
- Omar Hassan (24 character), character in the American television series 24
- Badyah Hassan, character in the American animated television series Dead End: Paranormal Park
- Kara Hassan, protagonist of the video game Rollerdrome

== See also ==
- Hazan (disambiguation)
- Hassan (given name)
- Hession (surname)
- Hassoun
- Hasson Heights, Pennsylvania, a census-designated place
- Irish name
- Osáin
- Hass (surname)
- Lists of most common surnames
