= Hassani =

Hassani may refer to:

== People ==
Hassani and al-Hassani is a given name and a surname, derived from the Arabic surname Hassan.

=== Given name ===
- Hassani Alwan (born 1955), Iraqi footballer
- Hassani Dotson Stephenson (born 1997), American soccer player
- Hassani Gravett (born 1996), American basketball player
- Hassani Shapi (1973–2024), Kenyan actor, particularly active in Italian cinema

=== Middle name ===
- Ahmad Hassani Baghdadi (born 1945), Iraqi Twelver Shi'a Marja
- Ali Hassani Sefat, Iranian football player
- Hossein Hassani Sa'di, Iranian regular military (Artesh) officer
- Shirin Hassani Ramazan (born 1980), Iraqi Kurdish politician

=== Surname ===
- Ali El-Hassani (1897-????), Egyptian footballer
- Bilal Hassani (born 1999), French singer, songwriter and YouTuber
- Fahardine Hassani (born 1993), Comorian footballer
- Farzad Hassani (born 1977), Iranian television presenter, actor and poet
- Gholamreza Hassani (1927–2018), ayatollah in Iran
- Hajim al-Hassani (born 1954), Iraqi politician and speaker of the Iraqi National Assembly under the Iraqi Transitional Government
- Hassan El-Hassani (1916–1987), Algerian comedian
- Ilias Hassani (born 1995), Algerian footballer
- Iliass Bel Hassani (born 1992), Moroccan footballer
- Jan Alam Hassani (born 1956), Afghan volleyball player
- Marwa Hassani (born 2002), French-born Moroccan footballer
- Maryam Hassani (born 1993), Bahraini sports shooter
- Mir Emad Hassani (1554–1615), Persian calligrapher
- Mohamed Hassani, Egyptian paralympic athlete
- Mohammad Ali Tabatabaei Hassani (1945–2017), Iraqi Twelver Shia Muslim cleric (ayatollah)
- Neda Hassani (1977–2003), Iranian protester who committed suicide by self-immolation
- Ric Hassani (born 1989), Nigerian singer, songwriter and musician
- Salih al-Hassani (politician), Iraqi independent politician and government minister
- Salim Al-Hassani, Iraqi mechanical engineer and academic
- Samya Hassani (born 2000), Dutch-born Moroccan footballer
- Shamsia Hassani (born 1988), Afghani artist and academic

== Other uses ==
- Hay El Hassani, a quartier of Casablanca, Morocco
- Hassani, Bannu, a town and union council in Bannu District of Khyber-Pakhtunkhwa, Pakistan
- Hassani Abdelkrim, a town and commune in Debila District, El Oued Province, Algeria
- Hassani Airport, former name of Hellenikon Air Base, Athens, Greece
- Hassaniya Arabic or Hassani, spoken in northern and northwestern Africa
- Seyyed Hassani, in Shia Islam, a Sayyid whose rising is predicted to be among the signs of the reappearance of al-Mahdi

== See also ==
- Hassan (disambiguation)
  - Hassan (surname)
- Hassania (disambiguation)
