= Omar Hassan =

Omar Hassan or Hasan may refer to:

- Omar Hassan Ahmad al-Bashir (born 1944), Sudanese politician - president of Sudan
- Omar Hasan (born 1971), Argentine rugby union player
- Omar Hassan (skateboarder), American skateboarder
- Omar Said Al-Hassan, chairman of the Gulf Centre for Strategic Studies, London
- Omar Hassan (24 character), a character in the American television series 24
- Omar Hassan (artist) (born 1987), Italian artist
- Omar Hassan (volleyball) (born 1991), Egyptian volleyball player
