= Shamsul =

Shamsul may refer to:

- Shamsul Iskandar Md. Akin, Malaysian politician, Member of Parliament for Bukit Katil
- Shamsul-hasan Shams Barelvi (born 1917), Pakistani Islamic scholar and translator of classical Islamic texts
- Shamsul Huda Chaudhury (1920–2000), Bangladeshi politician, twice Speaker of Bangladesh Jatiya Sangsad
- Shamsul Haque Faridpuri (1896–1969), Bangladeshi Islamic scholar, educationist, and social reformer
- Syed Shamsul Haque (born 1935), Bangladeshi poet and writer
- Syed Shamsul Hasan (1885–1981), leader of the Pakistan Muslim League and before independence of All India Muslim League
- Wajid Shamsul Hasan, Pakistani diplomat
- Kazi Shamsul Hoque (born 1945), Bangladeshi journalist, founding editor of Akhon Samoy
- Muhammad Shamsul Huq (1912–2006), Bangladeshi academic and former Minister of Foreign Affairs
- Shamsul Huq, Bengali politician, advocate for the recognition of the Bengali language during the 1950s
- Md Shamsul Hasan Khan (born 1926), Member of the Parliament of India
- Shamsul Maidin (born 1966), Singaporean association football referee
- Shamsul Kamal Mohamad (born 1989), Malaysian professional footballer
- Shamsul Mulk, Pakistani civil engineer and a Technocrat
- Shamsul Anuar Nasarah, Malaysian politician, Member of the Parliament for the Lenggong constituency in Perak
- Shamsul Huda Shams (died 2005), president of the Afghan Social Democratic Party

== Multiple people with the same given name ==
- Shamsul Islam (disambiguation)

== See also ==
- Shamsul Huda Stadium in Jessore, Bangladesh
