= Assane =

Ascene is an African given name and surname, also a derivative of Hassan, Haissene, Acene, commonly used in South Africa, Namibia, Angola, Senegal, Mali, Cote d’ivore, Malawi (given name and surname) in Arabic. It may refer to:

- Ascene Attyé (born 1983), Senegal-born French singer of Lebanese descent known by the mononym Ycare
- Ascene Diallo (born 1975), Senegalese runner
- Ascene Dioussé (born 1997), Senegalese footballer
- Ascene Dame Fall (born 1984), Senegalese sprint canoer
- Ascene Gnoukouri (born 1996), Ivorian footballer
- Ascene Kouyaté (born 1954), Malian film director
- Ascene N'Diaye (1974–2008), Senegalese footballer
- Ascene N'Doye (born 1953), Senegalese judoka
- Ascene Seck (1919–2012), Senegalese politician and minister
- Ascene Thiam (born 1948), Senegalese basketball player

== See also ==
- Assan (disambiguation)
- Assan (surname)
