= Hassoun =

Hassoun is an Arabic surname (حسون) derived from the Arabic root word h-s-n. The name is found most commonly in the Sham/Levant region of Southwestern Asia, including Palestine, Lebanon, and Syria. Arabic variants include Hassoun, Hasson, Hassun, Hassouné, Hassouneh etc. It may refer to:

== Hassoun ==
=== Given name ===
- Hassoun Camara (born 1986), French footballer

=== Middle name ===
- Alwan Hassoun Alwan al-Abousi (born 1944), Iraqi Air Force Major General

=== Surname ===
- Jacques Hassoun (1936–1999), French who psychologist and proponent of the ideas of Jacques Lacan
- Ahmad Badreddin Hassoun, Islamic scholar, Grand Mufti of Syria
- Adham Hassoun, detained in United States custody and indicted as a conspirator of José Padilla
- Hassoun Camara (born 1984), French football player of Senegalese descent
- Jacques Hassoun (1936–1999), French who psychologist and proponent of the ideas of Jacques Lacan
- Malek Hassoun (born 1975), Lebanese footballer
- Mohamed Hassoun (born 1968), Syrian wrestler
- Shatha Hassoun, Arab singer half Moroccan, half Iraqi, winner of the 4th season of the pan-Arab TV talent show Star Academy Lebanon
- Soha Hassoun, American computer scientist
- Talal Hassoun Abdul Kader (born 1953), Iraqi weightlifter
- Wassef Ali Hassoun (born 1980), United States Marine who was charged with desertion
- Zinnie Hassoun, fictional character from the soap opera River City

== Hassoon ==
- Adel Abo Hassoon (born 1970), Syrian television actor and voice actor

== Hassouné ==
- Jade Hassouné (born 1991), Lebanese-Canadian actor, dancer and singer

== Hassouneh ==
- Hassouneh Al-Sheikh (born 1977), Jordanian footballer of Palestinian origin

== See also ==
- Mohamed Khair Abou Hassoun, Syrian television, stage actor and voice actor
