= Hassania (disambiguation) =

Hasania tribe also known as Hassania tribe, are members of a Muslim tribe of Arab origin.

Hassania or al-Hassania may also refer to:

== Places ==
- El Hassania, a town in northern Algeria
- Hassania School of Public Works, Casablanca, Morocco, one of Morocco's oldest engineering schools

== Sports ==
- Hassania Agadir or Hassania Union Sport Agadir, a Moroccan sports club based in Agadir, Morocco
- Hassania Athletic Sidi Slimane, Moroccan football club
- Hassania Sportive Ben Slimane, also called HSB Slimane, Moroccan football club

== Persons ==
- El-Hassania Darami (born 1953), Moroccan long-distance runner

== See also ==
- Hassan (disambiguation)
- Hassani (disambiguation)
