= Cleto =

Cleto may refer to:

== People ==
- Albino Mamede Cleto (1935–2012), Portuguese Roman Catholic bishop
- Cleto Bellucci (1921–2013), Italian Prelate of Roman Catholic Church
- Cleto Escobedo III (1966–2025), American musician and bandleader
- Cleto González Víquez (1858–1937), Costa Rican president
- Cleto Maule (1931–2013), Italian racing cyclist
- Cleto Rodríguez, American soldier
- Isaac Cleto Hassan, South Sudanese physician and politician
- Maikel Cleto (born 1989), Dominican baseball pitcher

== Places ==
- Cleto, Calabria, town in the province of Cosenza in southern Italy
- José Cleto Airport, also known as União da Vitória Airport, Brazil
