= Assan =

Assan may refer to:

- Asan Barrage, India
- Asan (people), an extinct ethnic group of Russia
- Assan language, an extinct language once spoken by those people
- Assan (surname), a family name

== See also ==
- Assam, where Assan may be a misspelling or a mispronunciation of Assam
- Assane
