= Husseinat people =

Ethnic group in Sudan

Husseinat are the members of an ethnic group of Sudan. They live around the White Nile. Husseinat are a subgroup of the Kawahla people They are Muslims and speak Sudanese Arabic.
