= Iqbal Mohammad Ali =

Pakistani politician

Iqbal Mohammad Ali is a Pakistani politician who is a member of the National Assembly of Pakistan. He is the chairman of the National Assembly Standing Committee on Sports. Over the 2010 Pakistan cricket spot-fixing controversy, Ali condemned the involved players and called for their removal from the Pakistan cricket team.
