= Ahmed Ali Salaad =

Ahmed Ali Salaad أحمد علي صلاد

Mayor of Galkayo
- Incumbent
- Assumed office February 6, 2013
- Preceded by: Saeed Abdi Farah

Col. Ahmed Ali Salaad (Somali: Axmed Cali Salaat, Arabic: أحمد علي صلاد) was a Somali politician. He became Mayor of Galkayo (the capital of the Mudug region in north-central Somalia) on February 6, 2013, succeeding Saeed Abdi Farah in office.
