= Assan (surname) =

Assan (Arabic: آسان, Hebrew: אסן), also confused or used as Hassan, is an Arabian, Anglo-Saxon and Ghanaian surname, and Kazakh and African given name. It is very common among Ghanaians and some parts of Europe. The surname may be found also among Lebanese refugees of South America who changed their surnames because of the war, as well as in Romanians.

== Given name ==
- Assan Bazayev (born 1981), Kazakh bicycler
- Assan Musa Camara (1923–2013), Gambian politician
- Assan Ceesay (born 1994), Gambian footballer
- Assan Jatta (born 1984), Gambian footballer
- Assan John (born 1978), Gambian sprinter
- Assan Ouédraogo (born 2006), German footballer
- Assan Seck (born 2004), Senegalese footballer
- Assan Takhtakhunov (born 1986), Kazakh Nordic combined skier

== Surname ==
- Amissah Assan (born 1993), Ghanaian footballer
- Bazil Assan (1860–1918), Romanian engineer and explorer
- Vitor Assan (born 1996), Brazilian musician

== See also ==
- Hassan
- Assane
