= Kawahla people =

Kawahla or Banu Kahil is an Arab tribe inhabiting Eastern Sudan. They speak Sudanese Arabic and are Sunni Muslim.

The tribe is a branch of Banu Udhra tribe a part of the larger Quda'a confederation, although the tribe claims to be from Zubayr ibn al-Awwam but it's believed to be in order to increase its prestige, sub branches of the tribe include Hasania tribe.

Most of the Kawahla are farmers, the main crops they grow are sorghum, wheat, cotton, beans (luba) and fruits such as La loba and Nabag. The Kawahla in Kurdufan migrate away from the wet season pasture to grazing land near permanent wells to wait for the dry season. In the 19th century, Hedley Vicars encountered the Kawahla, whom asked him to settle their dispute with other tribes. Lord Edward Gleichen also wrote about the Kawahla.

== See also ==
- Zubayrids
