= Tammam Hassan =

Expert in the field of Arabic linguistics

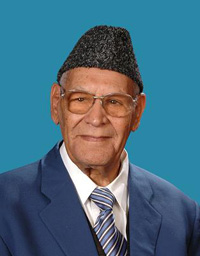
Tamman Hassan

Tammam Hassan (Arabic: تمام حسان) (1918-2011) was an academic in the field of Arabic linguistics.

== Education and career ==
Hassan was born in 1918 in the Upper Egyptian village of ElKarank.

In 1929 Hassan completed memorizing the Qur’an. The following year he moved to Cairo to attend Al-Azhar primary-school institute. He graduated from Al-Azhar high-school institute in 1939. He attended Dar Al-Ulom College, where he majored in Arabic Language and graduated in 1943 with an associate degree. He then continued to study education and psychology at Dar Al-Ulom College, graduating in 1945 (first honor award) with his teaching license. The following year he moved to London to learn English and finish his graduate studies. Hassan graduated from the University College London (UCL) in 1949 with his master in phonetics. His graduate thesis topic was The Phonetics of "ElKarank" Dialect (Upper Egypt). Hassan graduated in 1952 from the University College of London with his PhD in phonetics. His dissertation was titled, The Phonetics and Phonology of Aden Arabic (South Arabia).

Following the completion of his studies, he traveled to Aden for six months to record the local dialect. The phonological model which he followed was prosodic analysis associated with the British linguists J.R.Firth.

Hassan began his career as a teacher of Arabic at a high school in Cairo in 1945. The following year he became a teaching assistant in Arabic, at Dar Al-Ulom College in Cairo. He maintained this position until traveling to London to continue his studies.

In 1952 Hassan became an associate professor of Oriental and Semitic Linguistic Studies. He published his first major work in 1955, Language Research Methods, an introductory work which established the use of descriptive method to analyze Fusha, classical Arabic. In 1956 Hassan became a volunteer officer in the Egyptian army during the British, French, and Israeli attack against Egypt. After the war in 1957, Hassan received a delegation for two months at the University of Michigan as part of the Fulbright Program. While in Michigan, he was trained to use modern devices for phonetics labs. He brought equipment with him to Egypt where he established the phonetics lab at the University of Cairo (Alarif, 2002).

Hassan became a cultural attaché at the Egyptian Embassy to Lagos, Nigeria for five years where he linked the educational relations between the private Islamic educational organizations and Egypt. As a result of his connections to the Embassy, Hassan brought many Egyptian teachers to teach in Nigeria. While still in Nigeria in 1964, Hassan was promoted to full professor. The following year he returned to Egypt where he was appointed as the Chair of Arabic Syntax and morphology department and also as the Vice Dean of Dar Al-Ulom College. In 1967 Hassan became a professor at the University of Khartoum for three years, where he established the department of Linguistic Studies. In 1972 he became the Dean of Dar Al-Ulom College where he was the general secretary of the Arabic language committee which is part of the highest council for the Egyptian universities. In the same year Hassan founded the Egyptian Linguistics Assembly.

In 1973 he became a professor at Mohammed V University in Morocco where he lived for six years. During the 1880s he became a professor at the Arabic for Non Native Speakers Institute, Umm al-Qura University in Mecca, Saudi Arabia for 16 years. There he founded the Educational Linguistics Department that teaches students to work as Arabic teachers for non-native speakers. In 1996 Hassan returned to Egypt to be an emeritus professor at Dar Al-Ulom College where he was active in the linguistic field in many ways until his death.

He died on 11 October 2011 in Cairo.

== Major contributions to Arabic linguistics ==
After studying under Firth as part of the London School, Hassan became the first linguist to study the phonetics and the phonology systems of Arabic based on modern linguistic methods. This work resulted in his influential text, Language Research Methods. Hassan was also the first Arab linguist to study the root morphology of Arabic words based on the main sounds of a given word rather than the gerund or the past tense form which had been the tradition of his predecessors. Hassan also established a theory on the Arabic dictionary based on vocabulary correlations. He was the first to categorize the Arabic parts of speech into seven parts rather than three which is the common traditional system of Arabic. Basically he used the function of the entities within the context to establish this system in his book, Arabic: its Meaning and Syntax. Hassan was also the first linguist who decided to analyze the Arabic verb tense in two dimensions: syntactic tense and contextual tense, evidence of Firth's influence on Hassan's work.

== Scholarship ==
In 1973 Hassan published Arabic: its Meaning and Syntax.

== Translations ==
Hassan translated the following works into Arabic:
1975 How Greek science passed to the Arabs by De Lacy O’Leary
1958 The Scientific Effect on Society by Bertrand Arthur William Russell
1959 Language and Society by Morris Lewis
1997 Arabic Thought and its place in History by De Lacy O’Leary
1998 Text, Discourse, and Function by Robert de Beaugrande

== Awards ==
His awards include:

- Al Basir Family International Prize, Saudi Arabia 1984
- Saddam Hussein Arabic Prize, Iraq 1987
- King Faisal International Prize, Saudi Arabia 2006
- The International Conference of Arabic and Humanity, Morocco 2008
