= Ross Gittins =

Australian economist (born 1948)

Ross Gittins AM FASSA FRSN
- Born: 13 February 1948 (age 78); Newcastle, New South Wales

Academic background
- Education: University of Newcastle, Australia
- Awards: Member of the Order of Australia (AM)

Ross Gittins (born 1948 in Newcastle, Australia) is an Australian political and economic journalist and author, known for "his ability to make dry, hard-to-understand economics and economic policy relevant".

== Early life and education ==
Ross Roderick Gittins was born 13 February 1948 in Newcastle, New South Wales where his family were living at New Lambton. His parents, Salvation Army officers moved to Sydney and Ross started schooling at Fort Street High School. The family then moved to Bathurst before moving back to New Lambton. Ross completed his secondary schooling at Newcastle Boys High School (1962 – 64).

Ross then matriculated to the University of Newcastle where he studied in the Faculty of Economics and Commerce being graduated in 1970 as a Bachelor of Commerce. He had studied part-time for 2 years whilst working with a Newcastle chartered accountant before gaining a Commonwealth Scholarship which enabled him to finish his studies on a full-time basis.

Upon completion of his degree, he moved to Sydney, where he worked for a large firm of chartered accountants.

== Finance journalist ==
Gittins regularly writes for The Sydney Morning Herald, The Age and previously wrote for The Canberra Times, commentating on underlying economic issues and political economic policies. In 1993 he won the Citibank Pan Asia award for excellence in finance journalism.

In 2003 Gittins wrote that prime minister John Howard had been "a tricky chap" on immigration, by appearing "tough" on illegal immigration to win support from the working class, while simultaneously winning support from employers with high legal immigration.

He celebrated his 30th year as the Herald's economics editor in 2008, having assumed the position during the Fraser government in 1978.

Gittins published the first edition of the Gittins' Guide to Economics for secondary students in 1988.

On 7 February 2024, The Sydney Morning Herald and The Age published an opinion piece by Gittins celebrating 50 years since he began at the paper in 1974.

== Health ==
In October 2025, Gittins was diagnosed with an infection that spread to his heart following a holiday, necessitating a surgery. He was reported to return to The Sydney Morning Herald and The Age soon in February 2026.

== Awards and recognition ==
Gittins was awarded a Centenary Medal in 2001 for service to economic journalism in Australia and made a Member of the Order of Australia on 26 January 2008 for service to journalism as a commentator on economic theory, policy and behavioural economics, and to the accountancy profession.

In 2011, Gittins was awarded an honorary Doctor of Letters from Macquarie University and in 2012 an honorary Doctor of Science in economics from the University of Sydney. In 2015 he was appointed an eminent fellow in the practice of economics at the Research School of Economics, Australian National University.

In 2017 he was elected a Fellow of the Royal Society of New South Wales and a Fellow of the Academy of the Social Sciences in Australia. In December 2018 the Australian National University awarded Gittins a Doctor of Letters honoris causa for his "exceptional contribution to journalism and economics in Australia".

Gittins is a Fellow of Chartered Accountants Australia & New Zealand.

== Bibliography ==
- Gittins, Ross: Gittinomics: living the good life without money stress, overwork and joyless consumption, Allen & Unwin, Crows Nest NSW, c2007, ISBN 978-1-74175-092-8
- Gittins, Ross: Gittins' guide to economics, Allen & Unwin, Crows Nest NSW, 2006. Edition: [4th edition], ISBN 1-74114-799-9
- Tiffen, Rod and Gittins, Ross: How Australia compares, Cambridge University Press, Cambridge, England, 2nd edition, 2009, ISBN 978-0-521-71245-3
- Gittins, Ross, Martin, P., Irvine, J., Denniss, R., Forsyth, A: The Australian economy : a student's guide to current economic conditions, Warringal Publications, Coburg, VIC, 2009, ISBN 978-1-921128-21-9
- Gittins, Ross: The Happy Economist : Happiness for the hard-headed, Allen and Unwin, Crows Nest NSW, 2010 ISBN 978-1-74175-673-9
- Gittins, Ross (February 2013), Gittins' gospel : the economics of just about everything, Allen & Unwin, ISBN 978-1-74331-355-8
- Gittins, Ross (June 2015), Gittins : a life among budgets, bulldust and bastardry, Allen & Unwin, ISBN 978-1-76011-287-5
