= Saeed Abdi Farah =

Saeed Abdi Farah سعيد عبدي فرح

Mayor of Galkayo
- In office August 24, 2011 – February 6, 2013
- Preceded by: Abdirahman Mohamdu Haji
- Succeeded by: Ahmed Ali Salaad

Col. Saeed Abdi Farah (Somali: Saciid Cabdi Farax, Arabic: سعيد عبدي فرح) is a Somali politician. He previously served as Mayor of Galkayo, the capital of the Mudug region in north-central Somalia.

== Career ==
Farah was appointed Mayor of Galkayo on August 24, 2011 by the autonomous Puntland administration.

In 2012, he launched seven new major development projects in the city. The latter include the construction of several schools and businesses in the Garsoor and Israa neighborhoods. Mayor Farah and the Mudug region Governor Mohamed Yusuf Jama (Tigey) also oversaw the opening of a new construction firm in addition to another water filtration company, Duuh.

On February 6, 2013, Ahmed Ali Salaad succeeded Farah as Mayor of Galkayo. During his time leading the municipal authority, Farah is credited with having considerably strengthened local security and promoted various social programs in the city in conjunction with the Mudug regional office. He is reportedly next slated to assume a leadership position with the Puntland Dervish Force (Puntland Daraawiish).
