= Peter Martin (economist) =

Australian economist

Peter Martin AM (born 1958) is an Australian economist, journalist and commentator.

== Career ==
Raised in Adelaide, Martin studied economics at Flinders University, where he earned a BEc(Hons). Martin spent a period of time employed by the Commonwealth Treasury Department.

=== TV and Radio ===
Martin makes regular appearances on Australian media outlets as a reporter, presenter and commentator including ABC TV show The Drum and Local ABC radio. He was the Economics Correspondent for ABC 7.30 Report, ABC Radio National programs AM and PM, and The World Today as a reporter and occasional presenter 1985–2002. From 1990, Martin was co-presenter of "Economics Report" with Phillip Lasker, Kristen Barry, Beverley O'Connor and Guy Houston. From 1993 to 2003, he contributed to the "Home Economics" segment of "Life Matters" program on Radio National with Geraldine Doogue and as co-presenter with Dr Gigi Foster for The Economists.

During 1996, he was Journalist in Residence in the Melbourne University Economics Department. From 2000 to 2001, he was the ABC's Tokyo correspondent.

From 23 January 2025 he was presenter of the Radio National program The Economy, Stupid, discussing economic implications of current events. Martin promised to introduce two notable economists each week. Podcasts of all programs are available for download from the ABC, also Spotify and Apple podcasts. The title was taken from the much-quoted line by James Carville, "It's the economy, stupid".

=== Print ===
Martin has been both an editor and contributor in print media. In 2014, he was appointed economics correspondent and then economics editor of The Age, ultimately leaving in 2018.

He then became economics editor of the Canberra Times and Sydney Morning Herald. While still working for Fairfax Media (now Nine Entertainment Co) he became Business and Economy editor and columnist for The Conversation.

== Achievements ==
- Distinguished Alumni of Flinders University for his contribution to popular understanding of economics (2016).
- Member of the Order of Australia (2019).

== Publications ==
- Peter Martin, Ross Gittins, Jessica Irvine, Richard Denniss and Anita Forsyth (2006) The Australian Economy: A Student's Guide to Current Economic Conditions (2006), Warringal Publications, Fitzroy, Vic.

== Personal life ==
Martin has four children and is married to Toni Hassan, a Walkley Award winning journalist, writer and emerging artist.
