= Interfaith Drug Policy Initiative =

The Interfaith Drug Policy Initiative, or IDPI, is a Washington, DC, area based non-profit organization that works to organize religious leaders around drug policy reform based on principles of compassion, morality, and community involvement.

== History ==
IDPI was founded in November 2003.

== Issues ==
IDPI focuses its federal work on three main issues:

- Changing federal law to allow for the use of medical marijuana.
- Repealing mandatory minimum drug sentencing and publicizing cases like Hamedah Hasan’s.
- Restoring financial aid to college students who have lost it because of a drug conviction. (Higher Education Act of 1965)

IDPI also advocates for drug policy reform at the state level, including support for state legislative initiatives and public education on drug policy issues.

== Mission statement ==
“The purpose for which this non-profit corporation is formed is to organize people of faith to promote drug policy reform; i.e., moving from prohibition laws toward reasonable and compassionate drug regulation, education and treatment.”
