= Ḥ-S-N =

Triconsonantal root of many Arabic words, meaning good, beautiful

Ḥ-S-N (Arabic: ح-س-ن) is the triconsonantal root of many Arabic words. Many of those words are used as names. The basic meaning expressed by the root is "good", "handsome" or "beautiful". This root occurs 194 times in the Qur'an, in 12 derived forms. The root is also used in the Hebrew word חסון meaning strong sturdy or handsome.

== Names ==
- Hassan, given name
- Hassan, surname
- Hussein, given name and surname
- Muhsin, given name
