= Pakistan cricket spot-fixing scandal =

Pakistan cricket scandal

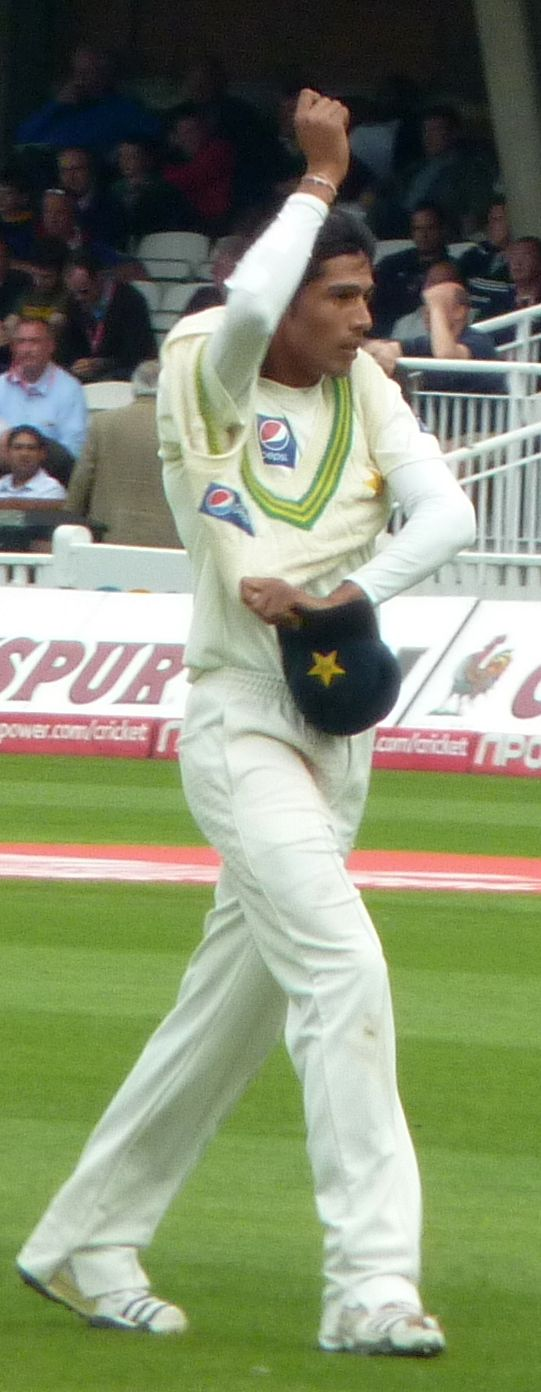
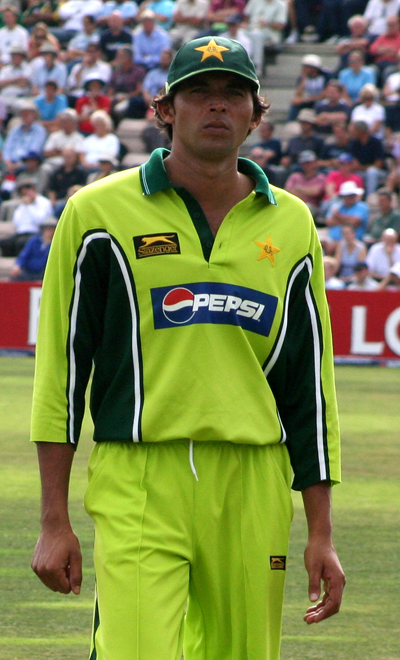
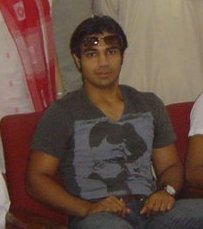
Mohammad Amir (left), Mohammad Asif (centre) and Salman Butt (right) were banned by International Cricket Council for 5 years from international and domestic cricket.

The Pakistan cricket spot-fixing scandal was a sports scandal that occurred during a Test match between England and Pakistan at Lord's, London, in August 2010. The scandal centers on three members of Pakistan's national cricket team, who were convicted of taking bribes from a bookmaker, to deliberately bowl no-balls at certain pre-arranged moments during the Test.

Undercover reporters from News of the World secretly videotaped the bookmaker for accepting money and informing the reporters that Pakistani fast bowlers Asif and Amir would deliberately bowl no-balls at specific points during the game. This information could be used by gamblers to place bets with inside information (i.e. spot-fixing).

In response to these allegations, Scotland Yard arrested the bookmaker on a charge of match fixing. The International Cricket Council (ICC) banned three Pakistan players – team captain Salman Butt, and the fast bowlers Mohammad Asif and Mohammad Amir — for terms of between 5 and 10 years. In November 2011, Butt and Asif were also found guilty by a London court on criminal charges relating to spot-fixing. Amir and the bookmaker had entered guilty pleas on the same charges. All four were given prison sentences, ranging from six months to 32 months.

== Context and history ==
In May 2010, Shahid Afridi was appointed captain of Pakistan for the series against Australia. After Pakistan lost the first Test against Australia, Afridi announced his resignation as captain. This led to Butt being appointed as Test captain.

While in July 2010, the ICC Anti Corruption and Security Unit served notices to two unnamed players seeking information into allegations of spot and match fixing. These notices were sent out to the players following England's first 2010 Test Match against Pakistan, at Nottingham. The notices informed the players that the ACSU was seeking certain information and gave the pair 14 days to respond.

== Sting operation ==
In August 2010, reporters from News of the World established contact with a sports agent who was suspected of involvement in match-fixing. In the video posted by News of the World, counting out the bribe money, predicted that Amir would be bowling the third over in the fourth test at Lord's, and that the first ball of the over would be a no-ball delivery. Amir did bowl the third over, and on his first delivery from the over, bowled a no-ball delivery. Commentary described the delivery as an "enormous no-ball, good half a metre over the line". Majeed also predicted that the sixth delivery of the tenth over would be a no-ball, and that ball, delivered by Asif, was also a no-ball delivery.

Yawar Saeed, the Pakistan team manager, declined to call for the resignation of team captain Salman Butt, implicated in the scandal. PCB president Ijaz Butt maintained that the players were innocent. At the same time, former Pakistan captain Rashid Latif suggested that the spot-fixing controversy might be a set-up and that the leaked video contained a certain number of ambiguities. Iqbal Mohammad Ali, a member of the National Assembly of Pakistan and chairman of the standing committee on sports, called for the removal of the players in question from the team.

== Professional bans ==
Salman Butt, Mohammad Asif and Mohammad Amir were each named in the News of the World investigation. All three players maintained their innocence of the charges levelled against them, but were suspended from playing pending an investigation by the International Cricket Council, which determined that they "had an arguable case to answer", on 4 September 2010.

Wajid Shamsul Hasan, the Pakistani High Commissioner to the United Kingdom, claimed that the players had been "set up" and were innocent of the charges. He condemned the ICC decision.

Butt subsequently filed an appeal to have his suspension lifted. Asif and Amir followed suit and the ICC announced that a hearing would be held in Qatar on 30 and 31 October. The interior ministry announced that the passports of the three cricketers had been given back to them so that they could travel to Qatar. Seven days before the appeal began Mohammad Asif announced that he had withdrawn his appeal because he wanted to understand the charges against him. Butt and Amir announced that their appeals were to continue. The ICC moved the hearing to the UAE. Salman Butt announced that he hoped the appeals would be completed quickly so that he could make a swift return to international cricket and participate in the series against South Africa in October 2010. Their initial appeal against the suspension was rejected on 31 October 2010. Butt and Amir hit out at the ICC saying that, although the ruling went against them, they weren't informed of the reasons for the decision.

A tribunal to decide the fates of the players was held in January 2011 The panel comprised Michael Beloff, Albie Sachs and Sharad Rao – all with previous experience in sporting trials. Butt and Amir objected to the selection of Beloff, contending that, as the head of the ICC disciplinary committee, he had a conflict of interest in favour of the ICC over the three cricketers. This was shown, they claimed, when he voted against lifting their suspensions. Butt's lawyer, Aftab Gul, withdrew from the case because he doubted his client would receive justice. The ICC also said that because the story was broken by News of the World, its reporters would feature in the case. A decision was deferred to 5 February 2011.

On 5 February 2011, it was announced that the ICC had banned all three players—Butt for ten years, of which five were suspended, Asif for seven years, of which two were suspended, and Amir for five years. The suspension of sentences for Butt and Asif were conditional on each "[committing] no further breach of the code and...[participating] under the auspices of the Pakistan Cricket Board in a programme of anti-corruption education". All three players were allowed to file an appeal with the Court of Arbitration for Sport.

In response to the announcement, The Independent said that "the game was at last standing up to its responsibilities," while The Guardian claimed that "the urgency to deliver a fierce deterrent to players everywhere has outweighed the need to make the punishment fit the crime."

== Criminal investigation ==
As a result of the newspaper report, Scotland Yard announced the same day that they had arrested the bookmaker on suspicion of conspiracy to defraud bookmakers. Two days later, after the Test match had been completed, three more arrests were made (two unidentified men and an unidentified woman) on suspicion of money laundering in connection with the allegations. Police also seized the cell phones of Asif, Amir, and Salman Butt as part of their investigations. Scotland Yard announced on 17 September 2010 that the initial file of the investigation had been passed on to the Crown Prosecution Service for them to decide whether to charge the players or not. On 5 November 2010 Scotland Yard announced that they had passed on the second file of fixing evidence to the Crown Prosecution Service. This moved the case one step closer to the courts.

On 1 November 2011, at Southwark Crown Court, Asif, Amir and Butt were found guilty of conspiracy to cheat at gambling and conspiracy to accept corrupt payments. Majeed and Amir were convicted following guilty pleas. The judge, Jeremy Cooke, rejected a plea in mitigation from Amir that he had been involved in spot-fixing on only one occasion, on the grounds that the contents of text messages submitted as evidence suggested otherwise.

The convictions were broadly accepted and welcomed within the world of cricket. Former Pakistan captain Aamer Sohail spoke of a "shameful" day for Pakistani cricket, adding "this is what happens when you don't react quickly enough to fight corruption". Former Pakistan Cricket Board chair Khalid Mehmood described the case as "an example for cricket in the future".

On 3 November 2011, jail terms were handed down of 2 years 6 months for Butt, 1 year for Asif, 6 months for Amir and 2 years 8 months for Majeed.

== Reactions ==
Then-Australia captain Ricky Ponting expressed concern over the addition of an Australian victory against Pakistan to a list of more than 80 previous matches under investigation. The match was scrutinized but was soon cleared due to lack of evidence. Australia won the match, despite a large first-innings deficit.

=== Football ===
==== Croydon Athletic F.C. ====
Croydon Athletic F.C. was bought in 2008 by Mazhar Majeed. The football club was investigated by HM Revenues and Customs due to allegations that he had been using the club for money-laundering purposes. The bookmaker had been recorded by an undercover journalist stating that was the only reason he had bought the club. This led to the manager and his assistant leaving the club after a match on 4 September 2010. Less than a month later on 2 October, the club's chairman David Le Cluse was found dead in a garage in Sutton with a bullet wound to his head. In February 2011, a verdict of suicide was recorded at Croydon Coroner's Court.

== Other investigations ==
After the spot-fixing scandal emerged Pakistan registered a victory against England in the third ODI and the ICC announced the match was under investigation due to suspicious behaviour. The ICC carried out a thorough investigation and the Pakistani team and players were given the all-clear to continue playing. Speculation about fixing in the third-ODI ended as the investigation closed.

=== 2010 ICC World Twenty20 ===
The ICC announced that a match between South Africa and Pakistan on 10 May 2010 was under investigation for spot-fixing. The ICC anti-corruption unit stated that two players had been questioned and that more details would be given in the next 24 hours. Pakistan won the toss and elected to Bat. In the end, Pakistan won the match by beating South Africa comfortably.

== Further allegations (Hameed and Haider) ==
Pakistani cricketer, Yasir Hameed denied the allegations published in News of the World that he had turned down a bookmaker's offer of £100,000 to help fix a Test. Hameed had allegedly told the newspaper that "almost every match" was fixed and criticised the players involved. Yasir Hameed denied the allegations, saying that he thought he was talking to a potential sponsor, and only stated what he read on the news. In November 2010, wicketkeeper Zulqarnain Haider left the Pakistani cricket team before their fifth and decisive one-day game against South Africa, and flew from Dubai (where the series was being held) to London's Heathrow Airport. Haider asked for asylum and claimed that he had been threatened to throw the game. Haider's Pakistani stipend was suspended by the Pakistani Cricket Board. The board expressed disappointment that Haider had left the team and flown to London instead of reporting the threats to the PCB and the ICC's anti-corruption unit.

== See also ==
- Betting controversies in cricket
- Pakistani cricket team in England in 2010
