= Abdirahman Mohamud Haji Hassan =

Abdirahman Mohamud Haji Hassan عبد الرحمن محمود الحاج حسن

Mayor of Galkacyo
- In office August 2009 – August 24, 2011
- Preceded by: Ahmed Ali Salad
- Succeeded by: Saeed Abdi Farah

Abdirahman Mohamud Haji Hassan (Somali: Cabdiraxman Maxamaduu Xaaji Xasan, Arabic: عبد الرحمن محمود الحاج حسن) is a Somali politician. He was the Mayor of Galkacyo, the capital of the Mudug region in north-central Somalia. A local businessman, Haji was appointed to the position in a 2009 election overseen by the autonomous Puntland administration. He was succeeded in office on August 24, 2011 by Saeed Abdi Farah.
