= De Lacy O'Leary =

De Lacy Evans O'Leary
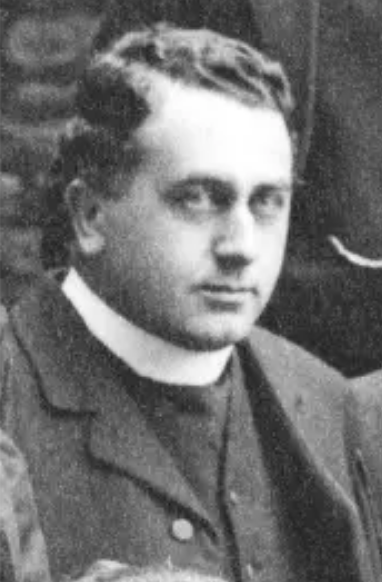
- Born: October 3, 1872; Cullompton, Devon
- Died: 22 July 1957 (aged 84); Bristol
- Occupation: Orientalist

De Lacy Evans O'Leary (1872–1957) was a British Orientalist who lectured at the University of Bristol and wrote a number of books on the early history of Arabs and Copts.

== Personal life ==
De Lacy Evans O'Leary was born in Devon in 1872, the eldest child of Henry O'Leary (1831–1908), a Mauritius-born Anglo-Irish former captain in the New Zealand militia, and Julia Hornsey (1841–1884). On his father's side, O'Leary was descended from Irish Catholics of Limerick, and included one of the generals in Wellington's Peninsular Campaign. (Note: Sir (George) De Lacy Evans (1787–1870) was a British Army general who served in four wars in which the United Kingdom's troops took part in the 19th century. He was later a long-serving Member of Parliament.) Brought up as a Protestant and educated at Bristol Grammar School, O'Leary converted to Roman Catholicism in about 1888 and began to train for the priesthood at Prior Park College near Bath, before returning to the Church of England in 1890.

He never married, and was an active freemason.

== Career ==
O'Leary studied at the University of London (1891–95) before becoming a minister in the Church of England, and later undertook further studies towards a Master of Arts at Trinity College Dublin (1905). He was awarded second prize in Trinity College's Elrington Theological Prize (1903) for an essay on the Epistle of St James, and the following year the Elrington Theological Prize itself for the essay "An Examination of the Apostolical Constitutions and of the cognate documents, with special view to those which have recently been made accessible".

O'Leary was special lecturer at the University of Bristol from 1908 until 1957, teaching Aramaic, Syriac, and Hellenistic Greek. He was the first chairman of the Bristol University Convocation, which represents graduates of the university, between 1910 and 1928. During World War I he was Captain-Chaplain of the university's Officer Training Corps and in 1916 served as a chaplain to the British Expeditionary force in Egypt.

O'Leary was made Inspector of Schools in religious knowledge for the Diocese of Bristol and vicar of Christ Church in the poor Barton Hill district of Bristol from 1909 until his retirement in 1946. Despite the large population of his parish, church attendance was poor and declined during his tenure. There was controversy about his curacy of the parish, which led to questions in the House of Lords in 1952 and an appeal to the Privy council. After World War II he retired from his parish and went to live in Weston-super-Mare with his sister, although he continued to visit the university occasionally. The church was later closed and torn down.

== Works ==
O'Leary published several Coptic liturgical manuscripts. These included:

- O'Leary, De Lacy (1923). Islam at the Cross Roads. London: Kegan Paul, Trench, Trubner & Co.
- —— (1923). The Coptic Theotokia. London.
- —— (1924). Fragmentary Coptic Hymns from the Wadi n'Natrun. London.
- —— (1926–1928). The Difnar (Antiphonarium) of the Coptic Church (2 vols). London.
- —— (1930). The Arabic Life of St. Pisentius.
- —— (1936). The Ethiopian Church: Historical Notes on the Church of Abyssinia. Society for Promoting Christian Knowledge.

He wrote books about Christian and Coptic literature. These included:

- —— (2002) [1909]. The Syriac Church and Fathers. Piscataway, New Jersey: Gorgias Press. ISBN 978-1-931956-05-5.
- —— (1912). Studies in the Apocryphal Gospels of Christ's Infancy. London.
- —— (1923). Comparative Grammar of the Semitic Languages. Routledge, Trench, Trubner.
- —— (1926). Colloquial Arabic: with notes on the vernacular speech of Egypt, Syria, and Mesopotamia, and an appendix on the local characteristics of Algerian dialect. K. Paul, Trench, Trubner.
- —— (1937). The Saints of Egypt. London.

He also wrote a number of books about Arabic history, including:

- —— (1922). Arabic Thought and Its Place in History. London: Kegan Paul, Trench, Trubner & Co.
- —— (2001) [1923]. Arabic History and Culture. Routledge. ISBN 978-0-415-24285-1.
- —— (1923). Short History of the Fatimid Khalifate. London: Kegan Paul, Trench, Trubner & Co.
- —— (1927). Arabia Before Muhammad. London: Kegan Paul, Trench, Trubner & Co.
- —— (1949). How Greek Science Passed to the Arabs. London.

== Notes and references ==
Notes

Citations

Sources

- Dodson, Aidan; Crossley Evans, Martin J. (2014), "De Lacy O'Leary: historian of the ancient Eastern Church and flawed cleric of the Anglican Church", in Dodson, Aidan; Johnston, John; Monkhouse, Wendy (eds.), A Good Scribe and an Exceedingly Wise Man: studies in honour of W.J. Tait, London: Golden House Publications, pp. 67–88, ISBN 978-1-906137-33-5
- Evans, Evan Herber (1911). "Evans, Sir George de Lacy" . In Chisholm, Hugh (ed.). Encyclopædia Britannica. Vol. 10 (11th ed.). Cambridge University Press. p. 2.
- "First Chairman of Convocation" (PDF), Biographies of the Former Chairmen of Convocation, Bristol University Alumni, archived from the original (PDF) on 1 May 2014
- Krause, Martin (1991). "O'Leary, De Lacy Evans (1872–1957)". Claremont College Digital Library. The Gale Group.
- McLoughlin, Leslie J. (2002). "De Lacy Evans O'Leary (1872–1957". In a Sea of Knowledge: The British Arabists in the Twentieth Century. Garnet & Ithaca Press. ISBN 978-0-86372-288-2.
