= Hay El Hassani =

Coordinates: 31°33′N 8°44′W

Hay El Hassani is a quartier of Casablanca, Morocco.
