= Hanan Qassab Hassan =

Hanan Qassab Hassan حنان قصاب حسن
- Born: January 1, 1952 (age 74) Damascus, Syria.
- Occupation: Writer, theatre director, academic

Hanan Qassab Hassan (Arabic: حنان قصاب حسن) (b. Damascus, January 1, 1952) is a prominent Syrian writer, theatre director and academic.

== Biography ==
Hanan's father was the prominent lawyer and writer Najat Qassab Hassan. She holds a PhD in French literature from the University of Paris III. She is currently the dean of the Higher Institute of Dramatic Arts in Damascus and a professor of Art history at the University of Damascus. She also served as the general secretary of the 2008 Arab Capital of Culture festivity.

Hassan has conducted many studies on drama, performing arts, plastic arts and culture and published in academic reviews and periodicals. She works as a consultant and co-ordinator for cultural activities for the Delegation of the European Commission in Syria and the French Cultural Center in Damascus. She is a member of the redaction committee for 2 reviews of drama and plastic arts, published by the Ministry of Culture in Syria. She is also a correspondent and writer for babelMed, a cultural website financed by the European Commission.

== Bibliography ==
- Dictionary of Theater, Terms and Concepts of Drama and Performing Arts, Librairie du Liban Publishers, Beirut, Lebanon, 1997 (in collaboration with Marie Elias).
- Exercises about Improvisation and Text Analysis in Theater, Higher Institute of Dramatic Arts Publications, Ministry of Culture, Damascus, Syria, 1988 (in collaboration with Marie Elias).
- The portrait in the Arab culture, BAHITHAT, vol X, 2004–2005, Beirut, Lebanon.
