= Ahmad Hassani Baghdadi =

Iraqi Twelver Shi'a Marja (born 1945)

Grand Ayatollah Sayyid Sayyid Ahmad Hassani Baghdadi

Personal life
- Born: 1945 (age 80–81) Iraq
- Website: www.alsaed-albaghdadi.com

Religious life
- Religion: Islam
- Sect: Shi'a; Twelver

Grand Ayatollah Sayyid Ahmad Hassani Baghdadi (Arabic: السيد أحمد الحسني البغدادي) (born 1945) is an Iraqi Twelver Shi'a Marja.

He currently lives in Najaf, Iraq. He is the author of numerous Islamic books.

End of the year 2012 he issued a fatwa that Christianity not be tolerated in Iraq. In 2015, he stated regarding Christians and Jews living in Muslim lands: "If they are people of the book (Jews and Christians) we demand of them the jizya and if they refuse, then we fight them. That is if he is Christian. He has three choices: either convert to Islam, or, if he refuses and wishes to remain Christian, then pay the jizya....But if they still refuse, then we fight them, and we abduct their women, and destroy their churches this is Islam!" In regard to non-Islamic religions (Hindus, Buddhists, etc.), he stated "As for the polytheists, We allow them to choose between Islam and war! This is not the opinion of Ahmad al-Husseini al-Baghdadi, but the opinion of all five schools of jurisprudence" (four Sunni: Hanbali, Shafi'i, Maliki, Hanafi; and one Shia: Ja'fari).

== Works ==
Ahmad Hosni Baghdadi's works include various topics such as Islamic jurisprudence and ijtihad, Quranic interpretation, Shi'a religious authority, and Iraqi politics. His works include Buhuth fi al-Ijtihad, Al-Sulta wa al-Mu'assasa al-Diniyya al-Shi'iyya fi al-Iraq, and Al-Quran wa al-Ra'y al-Akhar.

== See also ==
- List of Maraji
