= Asher Hassin =

Israeli politician (1918–1995)

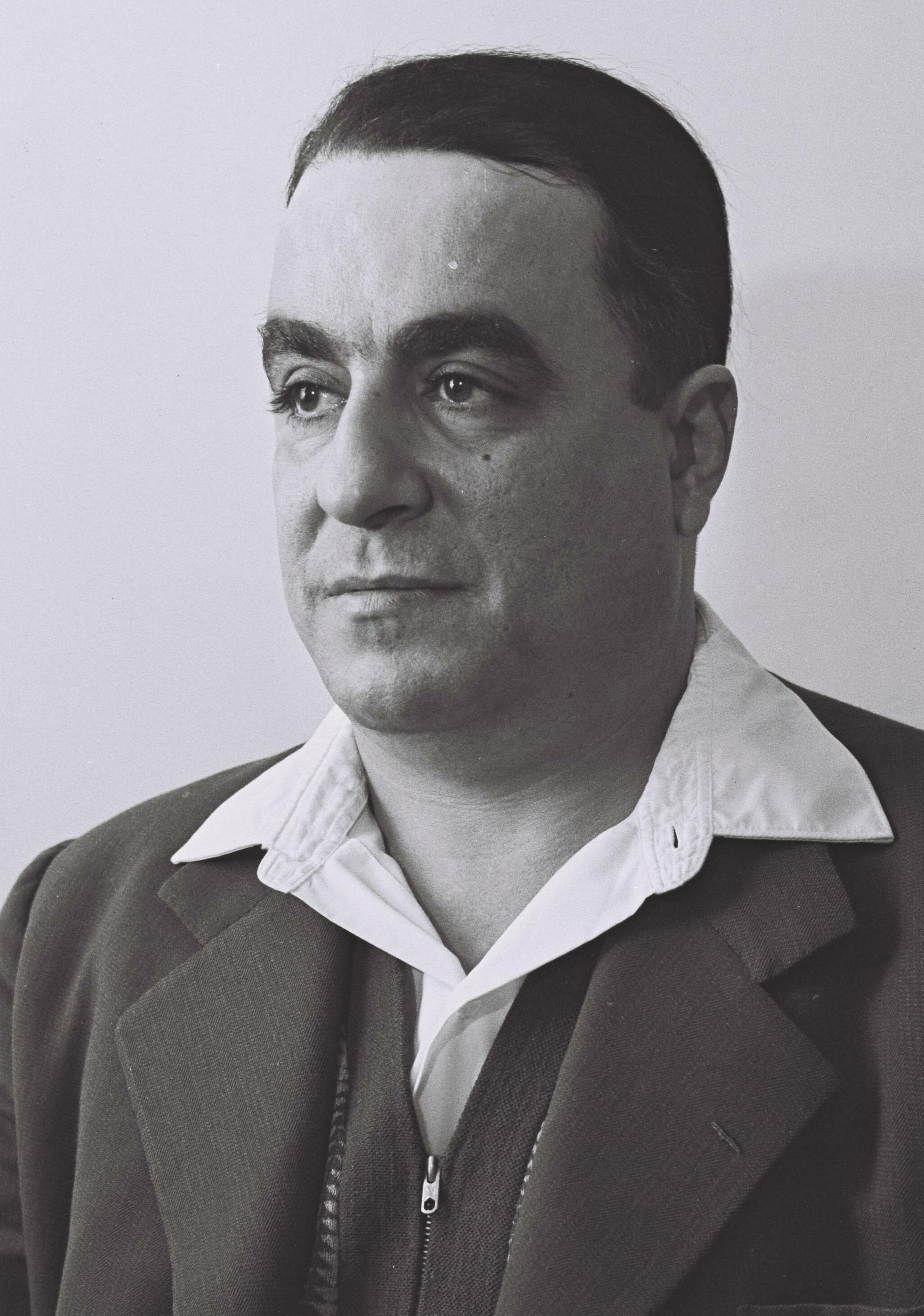
- Hassin in 1959

Faction represented in the Knesset
- 1959–1965: Mapai
- 1965–1968: Alignment
- 1968–1969: Labor Party
- 1969: Alignment

Personal details
- Born: 7 July 1918; Casablanca, Morocco
- Died: 27 March 1995 (aged 76)

Asher Hassin (Hebrew: אשר חסין; 7 July 1918 – 27 March 1995) was an Israeli politician who served as a member of the Knesset for Mapai and its successors between 1959 and 1969.

== Biography ==
Born in Casablanca in Morocco, Hassin attended a teachers seminary and worked as a Hebrew teacher, chairing the country's Hebrew Teachers Association and the Casablanca Hebrew Club. He was also amongst the leadership of the Zionist Federation of Morocco and edited the HaAviv newspaper.

In 1948 he emigrated to Israel. He joined Mapai and was elected to the Knesset on the party's list in 1959, and was re-elected in 1961 and 1965. He lost his seat in the 1969 elections.

He died in 1995 at the age of 76.
