= Hassani, Bannu =

Hassani
- Town and union council
- Country: Pakistan
- Region: Khyber-Pakhtunkhwa
- District: Bannu District
- Time zone: UTC+5 (PST)

Hassani is a town and union council in Bannu District of Khyber-Pakhtunkhwa, Pakistan.
