= Ahmad Ali Hasan =

Ahmad Ali Hassan
- Born: 1916; Almlaja, Tartous, Beirut Vilayet, Ottoman Empire
- Died: 5 July 2010 (aged 93–94)

Ahmad Ali Hassan (Arabic: أحمد علي حسن; 1916 – 5 July 2010) was a Syrian classical poet. He was born in 1916 in Almlaja village in Tartous and died on 5 July 2010.

== Work ==
Hassan wrote his first article and sent it to the Egyptian magazine called "The guidance of Islam," and it was published in 1935. In 1938, he published his first collection of poetry called "Alzfrat”. He also wrote under the heading "social literary collection of poems".

In 1938, he joined the Institute of Islamic Religious in Damascus (now the College of Sharia) but did not complete the study. He worked in 1939 as chief editor of the newspaper "Voice of Truth" which was published in Lattakia. He settled starting from 1948 in his job of Justice until his retirement in 1974, turning on the job between Safita, Banias, and Tartous. During that period, his name merged in the field of literature and culture, and devotes himself as one of the important poets of Syrian classical and was well known in that period, participating in major poetry festivals such as “Abu Firas al-Hamdani festival" in Aleppo, and "Sharif Razi festival" in Lattakia also contributed in the founding of Al Zahra charitable society of and Okaz literary forum in Banias. He participated in the founding conference of the Arab Writers Union in Damascus and contributed in several conferences. Union also sent him as a part of its cultural delegation to Germany in the early 1970s. He published several collections of poetry, including: Alzfrat, River of Beam, Dampness and Shades, Luminous Poems, on the Graves of Loved ones, Sababat.

He entered at his early age, and his early cultural and literary life in the dialogue on the pages of some magazines, literary and intellectual with Suhail Idris and also with Albert Doumit. He also rebutted later in separate books on books by other writers such as Abu Musa Al-Hariri and Abdul Hussein Al-Askari.

== Other topics of interest ==
He was interested in history and thought was of his research and books in this area: "Sufism dialectic and affiliation" which is considered as one of the important researches in this field, as he chronicled to the village of Hmmein, and he searched in an analytical and historical reading, and anthropological approach to the life and travels of poet mystic "Almkazhon Alsnjari" quoted through them, as hypotheses of the research, on whereabouts of the tomb of this poet, where it is a place of disagreement. In addition to several books included articles in literary criticism, including: Spotlight, Attitudes and Emotions.
