= Sarvat Hasin =

- Born: 1991 (age 34–35)
- Education: Royal Holloway, University of London; University of Oxford
- Years active: 2016–present

Sarvat Hasin (born 1991) is a British-Pakistani writer. She began her career with the novels This Wide Night (2016) and You Can't Go Home Again (2018), published in India. Her third novel The Giant Dark (2021) won the inaugural Mo Siewcharran Prize and was shortlisted for the Encore Award.

== Early life ==
Hasin was born in West London and grew up in Karachi. She returned to England for university, graduating with a degree in Politics from Royal Holloway, University of London. She completed a Masters (MSt) in Creative Writing at Oxford.

== Career ==
Via Penguin India, Hasin's debut novel This Wide Night was published in 2016. Set in 1970s Karachi and London and centred around the four Malik sisters, the novel is based on Louisa May Alcott's Little Women. This Wide Night was longlisted for the DSC Prize for South Asian Literature.

This was followed by Hasin's second novel You Can't Go Home Again in 2018. Told through seven vignettes, the urban legend-inspired novel deals with the aftermath of a high school production's cast member going missing. You Can't Go Home Again was named one of the best books of 2018 by Vogue India. Hasin's writing drew comparisons to that of Mohsin Hamid and Kamila Shamsie.

In 2019, Hasin's next novel The Giant Dark won the inaugural Mo Siewcharran Prize. She consequently secured a book deal with Dialogue Books, through which The Giant Dark was published in 2021. The novel is a loose contemporary reimagining of the Greek myth of Orpheus and Eurydice set in the music industry. The Giant Dark was shortlisted for the Royal Society of Literature's 2022 Encore Award and the inaugural Bad Form Book the Year.

On the side, Hasin works at the Almeida Theatre as a dramaturg. She also contributed an essay to Desi Delicacies, edited by University of York's Claire Chambers.

== Bibliography ==
=== Novels ===
- This Wide Night (2016)
- You Can't Go Home Again (2018)
- The Giant Dark (2021)
- Strange Girls (2026)

=== Essays ===
- "Stone Soup" in Desi Delicacies (2020; also known as Dastarkhwan), edited by Claire Chambers
