= Yaron Hasson =

Israeli guitar player

- Origin: Israel
- Genres: Classical
- Occupation: Guitarist
- Instrument: Guitar
- Education: ARCM, Royal College of Music (1988)
- Awards: First prize in Israel's national guitar contest (1988); America Israel Cultural Foundation’s scholarship (10 consecutive years)

Yaron Hasson (Hebrew: ירון חסון) is an Israeli guitar player.

== Life and works ==
Yaron Hasson is a graduate of the Performance Department (Guitar) at the Royal College of Music in London (1988) with an ARCM qualification. In the same year he won first prize in Israel's national guitar contest.

Yaron has performed in festivals including the Israeli-Spanish Cultural Week, to which he was invited along with the Israeli Philharmonic Orchestra and Bat-Dor Dance Company, as a representative of Israeli musical life. He has also performed in festivals in Belgium, Spain, France, Italy, Russia, the Czech Republic, Romania and Israel.

Yaron has given numerous concerts in Europe, including performances with a variety of musical groups. He has performed as a soloist with Israeli orchestras including the Jerusalem Symphony Orchestra, the Rishon LeZion Symphonic Orchestra, the Israel Sinfonietta Beer Sheva, the Haifa Symphony Orchestra, the Israeli Chamber Orchestra and the Kibbutz Chamber Orchestra. In 2007, he also performed as a soloist with the George Enescu Philharmonic Orchestra, conducted by Shlomo Mintz.

In October 2010, Yaron performed his first concerto for guitar and orchestra: "On Thy Walls Jerusalem" with two symphonic orchestras (Marosvasarhely/Tirgu-Mures, Szatmar /Satu-Mare) conducted by maestro Shinya Ozaki. Yaron has been giving several master classes in Europe and Israel.

His recordings include recitals for the Italian, Russian, Spanish, Czech, Belgium, Romanian and the Israeli Broadcasting Service (radio and television) Hasson has recorded six CDs, which were praised by the critics of the British Classical Guitar magazine.

Yaron has been invited several times to judge in international guitar competitions.

He has also won the America Israel Cultural Foundation’s scholarship for 10 consecutive years.

Yaron Hasson plays a guitar made by Dr. Ezra Levy.

== Discography ==
- "Yaron Hasson", Jerusalem Music Centre in 2000
