= Syed Shamsul Hasan =

Syed Shamsul Hassan
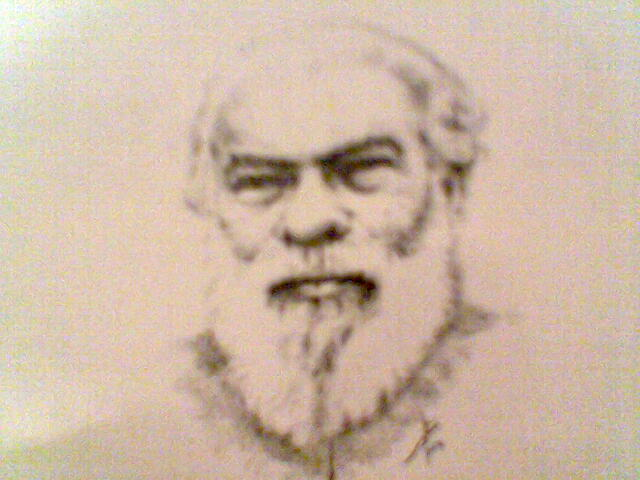
- Born: 1882; Bareilly, Bareilly district, United Provinces of British India, now Uttar Pradesh, India
- Died: 7 November 1981 (aged 99); Karachi, Sindh, Pakistan
- Resting place: Sakhi Hassan Graveyard, Karachi, Sindh, Pakistan
- Children: Khalid Shamsul Hasan (son); Rashid Shamsul Hasanl (son); Noor ul Hasan Sajid (son); Syed Siraj ul Hasan Zahid (son); Majid Shamsul Hasan (son); Wajid Shamsul Hasan (son)

Syed Shamsul Hasan (1882 – 7 November 1981) was a leader of the Pakistan Muslim League and before independence of All India Muslim League.

== Life ==
Syed Shamsul Hasan joined the staff of the All India Muslim League (AIML) in July 1914 as Assistant Secretary, and after a short while he took over charge of party’s central office as Secretary. He held this position until independence South Asia into India and Pakistan. The importance of his role in Pakistan’s independence was realized after his death. He was not only responsible for running day to day league operations and financial management, but also keeping in touch with all the league leaders including Liaquat Ali Khan and Allama Iqbal and keeping Quaid informed.

He was known to protect Quaid and Liaquat Ali Khan's back and equipped them with tools that are needed to continue the struggle for an independent state. He was the only one who was entrusted by Quaid himself to safeguard and responsible to transfer the AIML records safely from Delhi to Pakistan. Syed Shamsul Hasan accomplished this task without any concern of putting his or his entire family's life in danger. After the bifurcation of the All India Muslim League in 1948 into the Indian Union Muslim League and Pakistan Muslim League, Syed Shamsul Hasan served Pakistan Muslim League in the same capacity until October 1958.

When President of Pakistan Iskandar Mirza declared martial law on 7 October 1958, all political parties were banned; their offices and records were taken over and sealed by this regime. Twenty days later Ayub Khan over thrown Iskandar Mirza and became the first military president of Pakistan. He took charge of all AIML records, put this real history of Pakistan in Hessian bags, removed from the site and left to decay on open rooftop of the Muslim league house. Part of it was destroyed until National Archive Researchers managed to retrieve the remnants in later years. The papers which Quaid-i-Azam had entrusted to Syed Sahib, known as Shamsul Hasan Collection, were entirely protected even after his death. His eldest son Syed Khalid Shamsul Hasan took over his father's responsibility and created Shamsul Hasan foundation for research. In 2006, this historical treasure was donated to National Documentation Center of Cabinet Division, Government of Pakistan.

== Awards ==
Syed Shamsul Hasan was awarded posthumously Sitara-e-Imtiaz (Star of Excellence) award on 23 March 2007 by the Government of Pakistan. He was also awarded Pakistan Freedom Movement Workers Gold Medal. This Gold medal was also awarded to his son Khalid Shamsul Hasan, for his work initially as Joint Secretary of All India Muslim Student Federation and later on for his meticulous research and analysis on Shamsul Hasan Collection Papers.

== List of Books written on Shamsul Hasan Collection ==
1. Plain Mr. Jinnah; Author : Syed Shamsul Hasan
2. Quaid-i-Azam's Unrealized Dream; Author: Khalid Shamsul Hasan
3. Sindh's fight for Pakistan; Author: Khalid Shamsul Hasan
4. Punjab and the Unionists; Author: Khalid Shamsul Hasan
5. Syed Shamsul Hasan; Author: Khawaja Razi Haider
6. Jinnah and Punjab- Shamsul Hasan Collections and Other Documents 1944 -1947; Author: Amarjit Singh
