= Jared Hassin =

American football player (born 1989)

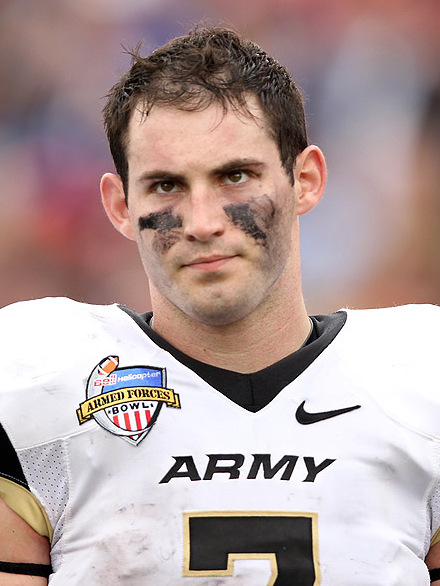
- Hassin playing for Army in the 2010 Armed Forces Bowl

No. 7 – Army Black Knights
- Position: Running back
- Class: Senior

Personal information
- Born: December 17, 1989; Delafield, Wisconsin, U.S.
- Died: October 24, 2023 (aged 33)
- Listed height: 6 ft 3 in (1.91 m)
- Listed weight: 235 lb (107 kg)

Career information
- College: Army Black Knights (2009-2012)

Jared Hassin (December 17, 1989 - October 24, 2023) was an American football running back who played for the Army Black Knights

Hassin was born and grew up in the state of Wisconsin. He played football at Kettle Moraine High School, where he played both running back and linebacker.

Hassin briefly attended the United States Air Force Academy, but quickly decided he wanted to transfer to the United States Military Academy. After transferring from the Air Force Academy to the Military Academy, Hassin sat out the 2009 season due to NCAA rules regarding transfers. Hassin rushed for 1,013 yards and scored nine touchdowns as a sophomore in 2010. He tied the Army school record in 2010 with four consecutive 100-yard rushing games. His output dropped in his junior and senior seasons, and he left the team with five games remaining in his senior year. Hassin graduated from the academy in 2013. Hassin was a third-generation member of the U.S. Army, as both his father and grandfather had served in it. His father had also graduated from the U.S. Military Academy.

Hassin deployed to Afghanistan.

Hassin had an affinity for dogs. He erected a memorial in Afghanistan to a war dog that had protected his unit's tactical outpost. Upon returning to civilian life, he volunteered with humane societies, ultimately adopting two dogs from them.

Hassin died on October 24, 2023.

== College statistics ==
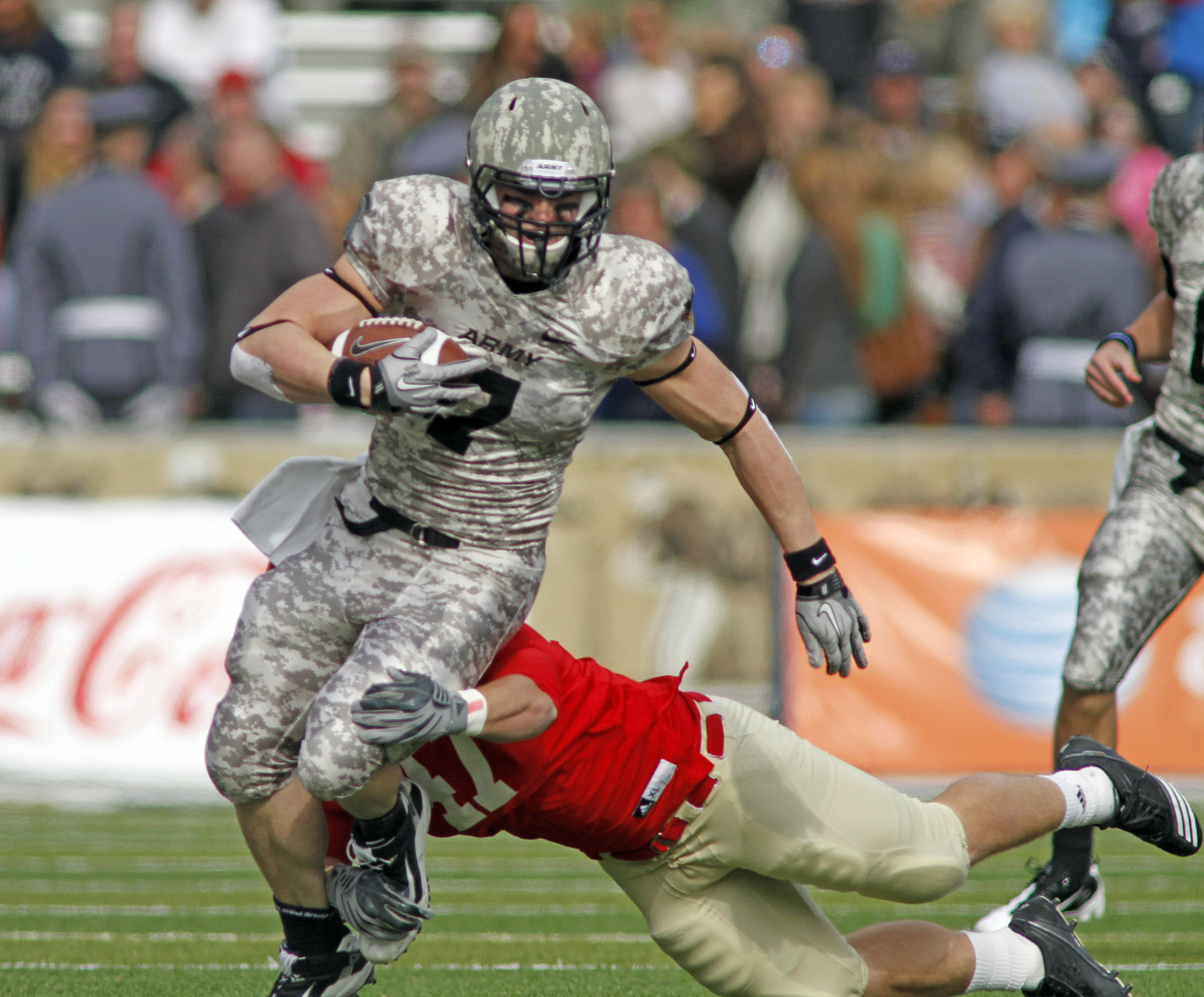
Hassin playing for Army in 2010

Year	Team	Att	Yards	Average	Long	TDs
2010	Black Knights	191	1,003	6.7	54	9
2011	Black Knights	67	316	4.7	21	1
College totals		236	1,510	6.4	66	18
