= Mohamed Khair Abou Hassoun =

Syrian actor (born 1960)

- محمد خير أبو حسون
- Born: 1960 (age 65–66); Syria
- Occupations: Actor, voice actor
- Years active: 1984–present

Mohamed Khair Abou Hassoun (Arabic: محمد خير أبو حسون; born in Syria) is a Syrian television, stage actor and voice actor. He received a Bachelor of Arts in Theater. He currently works in TV and theatre and is known for voicing characters in many anime.

== Business ==
=== TV series ===
- Last man my mom
- Ruby (2012 TV series)

=== Plays ===
- Sour grapes
- Goya
- Before the snow melts

=== Anime ===
- Monster Rancher
- One Piece as Buggy, Captain Kuro, Arlong, Smoker, Mr. 3, Dalton, Johnny, Eric
- Naruto as Tazuna, Black Zetsu (ep 134), Fujin
- Bakugan Battle Brawlers as Drago, Preyas (Predator), Gorem (Golem)
  - Bakugan Battle Brawlers: New Vestroia as Drago, Volt Luster, Zenoheld
  - Bakugan: Gundalian Invaders as Barodius
- Hunter x Hunter
- Inuyasha as Naraku
- Gad Guard as Jacque Bruno
- Dragon Ball as General White, Bacterian, Giran
- Dragon Ball Z as Vegeta, Freeza, Cui, Recoome
- Peacemaker Kurogane as Susumu Yamazaki
- Flame of Recca as Kashamaru, Noroi
- Gankutsuou: The Count of Monte Cristo as Baron Jullian Danglars
- Fist of the North Star as Jackal
- Solty Rei as Grey Walker
- Hakugei: Legend of the Moby Dick as Giant
- Yo-kai Watch
- Ranma 1/2
- Detective Conan
- Battle B-Daman
- Monster Hunter Stories: Ride On as Doctor Manelger, Riddlemaster, Rasu
- Mobile Suit Gundam Wing as Mueller
- Kuroko's Basketball as Genta Takeuchi
- Fushigi Yugi
- Samurai 7 as Rikichi
