= Richard S. Hassan =

United States Air Force general

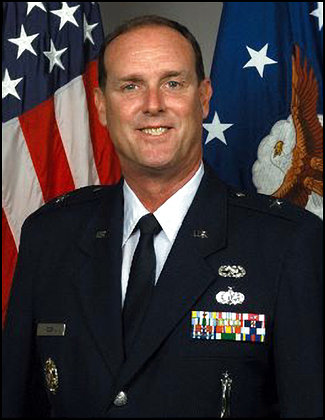
Hassan

Richard S. Hassan is a retired officer of the United States Air Force. He served as director of the Air Force Senior Leader Management Office in Crystal City, Virginia, overseeing career development for senior leaders in the Air Force. He is of Irish background.

Though Hassan was a brigadier general, the Secretary of the Air Force retired him in the lower grade of colonel shortly after he was found to have sexually harassed female subordinates, engaged in unprofessional relationships and created a hostile work environment. The revelations about Hassan surfaced shortly after a similar scandal involving former top Air Force Major General Thomas J. Fiscus and shortly before a scandal involving another high-ranking Air Force officer, Colonel Michael D. Murphy.
