= Aftab Hasan =

Pakistani writer

Aftab Hassan
- Born: 9 September 1909; Bazidpur, Bihar, British India (present Punjab, Pakistan)
- Died: 26 February 1993 (aged 83); Karachi, Pakistan
- Known for: Science education in Pakistan, advancement of Urdu
- Scientific career
- Fields: Science, education, linguist

Aftab Hasan (Urdu: آفتاب حسن) commonly known as Major Aftab (ميجر آفتاب), was an educationist, and linguist, who was instrumental in introducing science education in the Pakistani public school system.

Hasan helped compile a new dictionary of Urdu language, adding technical terms. Hasan also translated an American science textbook, Understanding Science, by William H. Crouse, into Urdu, with a grant from United States Department of State.

== See also ==
- National Language Authority
