= Rushan Khasanov =

Russian footballer

Personal information
- Full name: Rushan Abdulkhakovich Khasanov
- Date of birth: March 27, 1956 (age 70)
- Height: 1.76 m (5 ft 9 in)
- Positions: Defender; midfielder; forward

Senior career*
Years	Team	Apps	(Gls)
1976	SKA Odesa	20	(1)
1977–1979	FC Torpedo Vladimir	?	(37)
1980–1983	FC Kuban Krasnodar	104	(18)
1984	Neftchi Baku PFC	29	(0)
1985–1989	FC Zorkiy Krasnogorsk	83	(5)
1989	IFK Luleå	1	(1)
- * Club domestic league appearances and goals

Rushan Abdulkhakovich Khasanov (Russian: Рушан Абдулхакович Хасанов; born March 27, 1956) is a retired Russian professional footballer.

Khasanov played in the Soviet Top League with FC Kuban Krasnodar and Neftchi Baku PFC.
