= Abrar Hasan =

- Born: July 1935 (age 91); Kanpur, British India
- Occupations: Lawyer and Constitutional Expert

Abrar Hasan (Urdu: ابرار حسن) is a lawyer and constitutional law expert based in Karachi, Pakistan. He is known for his arrest following a state of Emergency imposed by Pervez Musharraf, during which 1,500 opposition leaders, lawyers and journalists were arrested.

== Biography ==
He was born in July 1935 in Kanpur, British India. He migrated to Karachi, Pakistan after the Partition of India. Abrar Hasan got his bachelor's degree in law from University of Karachi. He later got a Juris Doctor degree from Georgia State University. He was appointed as an arbitrator by the International Court of Settlement in Belgium. Abrar Hasan has taught law at Pakistani law colleges and was Principal of Islamia Law College, Karachi, 1997-1998. His law firm, Abrar Hasan and Company, has been in business since 1962. Abrar Hasan has written books on constitutional matters, and intent and interpretation of law. A few of his books are part of law curriculum in Pakistan. Pakistan Academy of Jurists, a non-profit organization he founded arranges meetings and seminars to educate people on Pakistani law and the international charter of human rights. Abrar Hasan has been part of Pakistani delegations to attend human rights conferences held in SAARC countries.

Abrar Hasan has been active in the politics of local and national bar associations. He was elected vice president of Karachi Bar Association (1973–1974), president Karachi Bar Association (1979–1980), vice chairman of Sindh Bar Council (1984), member executive committee of Supreme Court Bar Association (1993–1995), and president of Sindh High Court Bar Association (2006–2007).

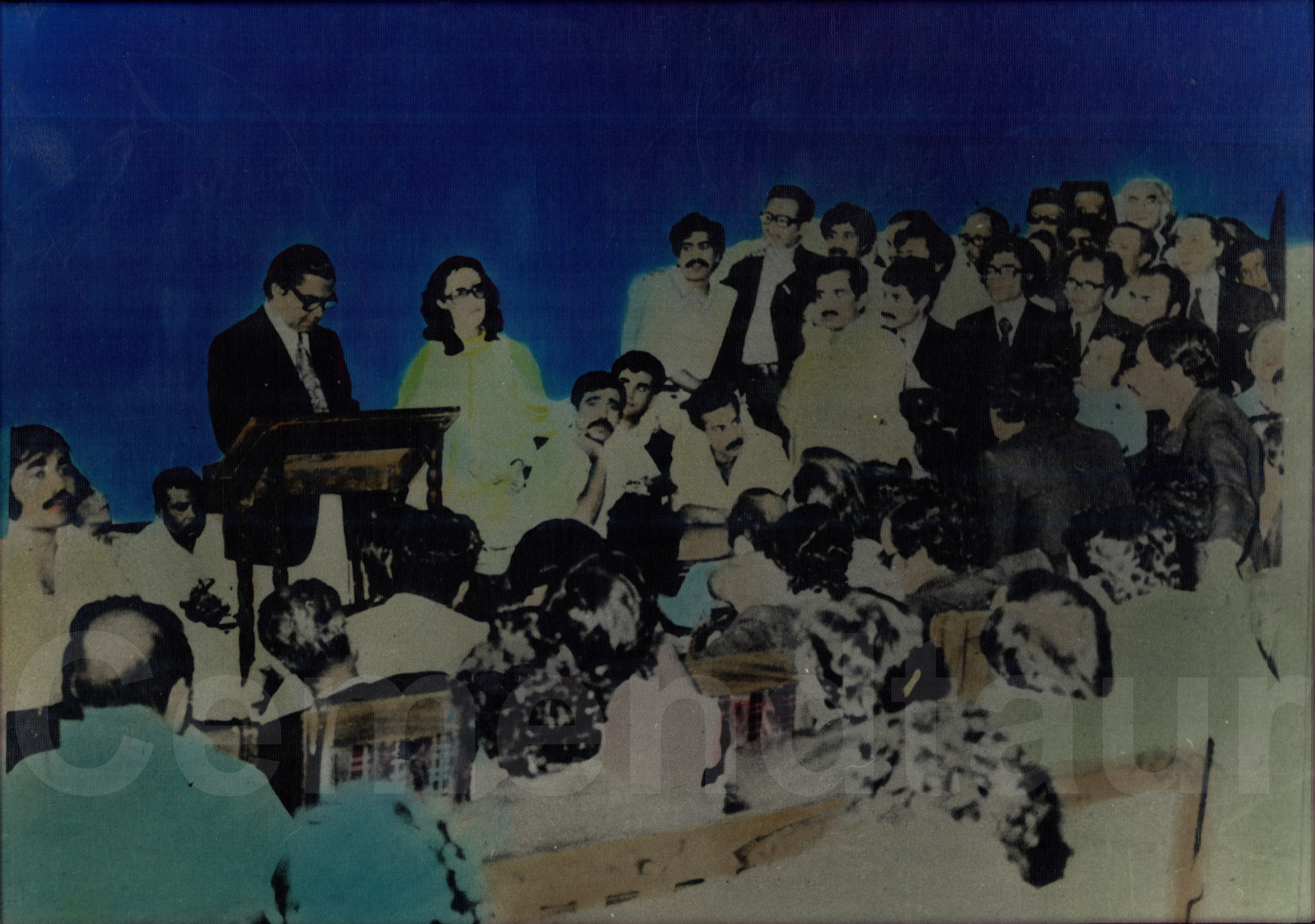
Benazir Bhutto visiting the Karachi Bar Association, circa 1979. Abrar Hasan welcoming her.

== Arrest following State of Emergency ==
In the wake of the state of Emergency imposed by Pervez Musharraf, Abrar Hasan was arrested on 4 November along with 1,500 opposition leaders including lawyers and journalists, whilst in custody he was denied meeting with his family. He was released from Karachi Central Jail on 19 November 2007.

On 12 May 2007 riots erupted in Karachi before the suspended chief justice Iftikhar Muhammad Chaudhry was able to make a speech to the Sindh High Court. In the aftermath of the riots Abrar Hasan, who was also the Sindh High Court Bar Association President, held meetings with Governor Dr Ishratul Ibad Khan.
