= Hamedah Hasan =

Hamedah Hasan is a notable example of one of the many individuals who have been incarcerated due to mandatory sentencing. Hasan describes receiving a longer sentence for a peripheral involvement in a drug ring, than the ring leaders because her peripheral involvement meant she had no information to trade for a lighter sentence. A perceived injustice in her case has attracted the attention of the Interfaith Drug Policy Initiative.

== Story ==
A mother of two, with one on the way, she moved from Portland, Oregon to her cousins' house in Nebraska to escape an abusive boyfriend. At the time, she was aware that her cousins were selling drugs but she did not take part, except on a few occasions when they asked her to wire money. The house was busted and all adults were arrested. Because Hamedah was not really involved in the drug smuggling, she had no information to trade for a reduced sentence and was given a longer sentence than the conspiracy leaders, a natural life sentence of 27 years. After 10 years Hamedah was able to get her sentence reduced to 12 years, but the ruling was overturned because her judge did not follow the federal sentencing guidelines. With the help of her attorney, Korey Reiman, Hamedah submitted an application for a presidential commutation. Her request was denied in 2008.

The sentencing judge, Richard G. Kopf, commented on the sentencing --

I sentenced Hamedah Hasan to her initial life sentence after writing a long opinion explaining why but also suggesting that the sentence was wrong. I then reduced her sentence when the Guidelines were first changed retroactively. In so doing, I reduced her sentence even more than allowed for by the change, but the Court of Appeals reversed, and in an en banc opinion, held that the additional reduction for post-offense rehabilitation was not permissible under the statute. Due to later retroactive amendments under the crack Guidelines, Ms. Hasan was eventually released from prison on Feb. 7, 2012 after serving about 18 years.

I felt horrible about the sentence I had imposed. As a result, I participated in activities to convince the President to commute her sentence. I wrote a letter to the DOJ pardon attorney and the President. I participated in Rev. Melissa Mummert’s film entitled A Perversion of Justice featuring Ms. Hasan. I asked a lawyer friend from a big firm that was politically connected to help with the commutation application. In short, and as I have remarked in other contexts, Ms. Hasan’s case caused me to seriously consider either resigning or simply refusing to sentence her according to the law.

Now, to be objective, Ms. Hasan was offered a plea that would have allowed me to sentence her to as little as 10 years in prison. She was represented by a good lawyer, known for her strong feminist views, who urged Ms. Hasan to take the deal. But Ms. Hasan was a very angry young woman. Ms. Hasan refused and elected to stand trial with relatives. Ms. Hasan was guilty as hell. She was not a victim and she was not innocent. She was involved in a boatload of crack (multiple kilos) while serving as the money handler for the small group that came from the west coast to Omaha to distribute their poison to the poor. In my opinion, and even though she had no criminal history and was a mother with children, she should have spent about 12 years in prison for her crime. But a life sentence, or even the “reduced” 324 month sentence (that was later reduced even further by retroactive amendments), was nuts.

== In popular culture ==
Hasan is the subject of a documentary by Melissa Mummert called Perversion of Justice which can be ordered via the website.
