= Mohd Fareed Shah Hassan =

Malaysian footballer

Fareed Shah
Personal information
- Full name: Mohd Fareed Shah Hassan
- Date of birth: 18 August 1979 (age 47)
- Place of birth: Selangor, Malaysia
- Height: 1.72 m (5 ft 7 1/2 in)
- Position: Forward

Senior career*
Years	Team	Apps	(Gls)
1999	Selangor FA		(1)
2000	Sabah FA		(2)
2001	Penang FA		(1)
2002–2003	Selangor FA		(6)
2004–2005	Selangor Public Bank		(6)
2006–2007	PKNS FC		(5)
2007–2009	Proton FC		(0)
- * Club domestic league appearances and goals

Mohd Fareed Shah Hassan (born 18 August 1979) is a Malaysian professional footballer.

He began his professional career with Selangor in Sukan Malaysia 1998 which saw Selangor won the gold medal. After one season playing for Selangor, he decided to sign with Sabah. He joined Penang in 2001 and won the 2001 Malaysia Premier One League.

He made a return to Selangor and help the team to beat his former team Sabah in 2002 Malaysia Cup final. In 2004, he move clubside Selangor Public Bank but move to PKNS FC after Public Bank withdrawal from the league in 2005/06 season. After 2006/07 ended, he sign with Proton FC.
