= Hassan Mohamed Hassan =

Egyptian artist (1906–1990)

Hassan Mohamed Hassan (1906–1990) (full name is Hassan Mohamed Hassan el-Feky, Arabic: حسن محمد حسن الفقى) was one of the pioneers of Egyptian modern art from the second-wave such as Saeed elSadr (1909–1986) and Ahmed Osman. Hassan has been called Painter of the Epics and Philosophies by critics and has been recognized by his colleagues for his strong adherence to Classical forms in Egyptian modern art. He has produced over 100 paintings some of which are on the large scale and most of which remain 'stored' with the family in his—now closed—residence near the Pyramids in Cairo. He had authored 4 books in arts, history of art, philosophy of art, and arts and society.

Born in Cairo in 1906 to a middle-class family with a Sufi Sheikh father, Hassan saw the early days of Egypt's semi-independence from Ottomans under British occupation. Typical of the vogue of the day at Cairo, he has been noted for his patriotism through the seeking of a modern identity of the nation embedded in both heritage and modernity. He died in Cairo on 30 March 1990, leaving three daughters and a son. His son Mohamed Hassan El-Feky followed his path and made a notable contribution to Egyptian contemporary art too.

== Education ==
He graduated on 1926, from the Egyptian School of Arts and Decoration (مدرسة الفنون والزخارف المصرية).

In 1929, he was sent by the Ministry of Knowledge (وزارة المعارف) to Czechoslovakia, then to Germany and Italy to what seems to have been a shift in his career perhaps as potential teacher in the Applied Arts. He studied techniques for the decoration of glass vessels. Always fascinated by fine arts, he has added learning of classical painting and anatomy to this by attending the nightly courses in the Accademia di Belle Arti di Venezia. It seems that this was in the hands of a professor DiStefani who was highly praised by the painter at the time. His career was back to painting as a specialist in oil painting, human body anatomy, and classical structures and arts.

Hassan could read, write and speak in English, Italian, French, and German in addition to Arabic his mother tongue. His library included books of literature, physical and social sciences, philosophy in different languages.

He has been curious throughout his life and even at the age of 80 was investigating things such as the nature of black holes in this universe.

== Career ==
Hassan started his career after graduation on 1926, as illustrator for the American Schools of Oriental Research in Palestine where William F. Albright was working.

He actively investigated the nature of his native country Egypt and its larger nation (the Arab world), the world, and the universe.

Some of his early works illustrate folklore and dramatic scenes from Cairo streets.

He participated in many expos in Egypt and abroad, but three exhibitions dedicated for his paintings stand out as important life landmarks:

1. In 1934 at the beginnings: Egypt Europe Exhibition
2. In 1954 at the height of his career: The Revolution Exhibition
3. In 1982 near the end: Hassan Mohamed Hassan Exhibition

His curiosity to understand extended to cover many political causes including the independence of his own country, pan-Arabism, and specially the conflict in Palestine which he experienced himself during his assignment on 1926.

=== Teaching positions ===
In 1931, he came back from Italy to teach in High School of Applied Arts (المدرسة العليا للفنون التطبيقية) which he – with efforts of his colleagues – transformed into a high Education College.

This stage is one of his more profound stages of his paintings.

In 1949, he was demoted from the College and transferred to a job as Inspector in Ministry of Education in which he spent 3 years. In 1952, he was re-instated by the Revolution committees and held his previous position in the College of Applied Arts (now affiliated with Helwan University) in which he continued teaching until he retired in 1966. After which he taught in the College for many years as Professor Emeritus.

He reached the position of Professor and Chair of Art History, Aesthetics, and Painting Department for Higher Studies (أستاذ ورئيس قسم تاريخ وفلسفة الفن للدراسات العليا ومواد التصوير بكلية الفنون التطبيقة).

=== Human universality and local causes ===
The subjects of Hassan's paintings reflect a deep concern of social and patriotic issues on a specific level as well as philosophically abstract ones. Emotions which could have been reflected through famous events, were rather drawn in ways which could be by any nation or any place in many of his works. He stripped the players and the place of any specific nation and still could convey the emotions of the situation. Other works have been still more abstract in subject and even theatrical in nature by showing very simple experiential situations which reflects appropriately the more intellectual riddles of this world.

For instance, his large-scale painting Struggle of Life depicting a few humans around a fallen boulder summarizes humans positions around a crisis put in the form of boulder, and how the humans are dealing with it. Their dress or lack of it, reflect a universal form which could happen in any society. Another painting titled Nuclear Beast showing a blood-thirsty creature of the like of Alghol of the Arabian Nights put to gigantic levels and walking over ruins of civilization is another one.

In his works, he focused on the impact of heroes rather than any specific one of them. Those who could be pioneers and impact their people and who could be belonging to any nation around the world.

His heritage-based work, however, has come a long way by recognizing the ancient Egyptian, Islamic and modern folkloric symbols and sides to the culture. He used many such symbols specially in his later works.

While philosophically his work may have reached and brought him recognition by the elite in Egypt and among his colleagues (and even recognition however limited in the little exposure he has had in Europe), it seemed always to address local concerns with much patriotism and solidarity with the weak. The conflict in Palestine was among the paramount issues, but also ones related to independence from the British as in one of his masterpieces with an unusually long title of Egypt Breaking Chains and Seeking Its Idol (مصر تحطم الأغلال وتنشد المثل الأعلى).

With all the attention which he gave to the subject, Hassan always introduced his actors in the painting in a dramatic context with dynamism with embodiment to human emotion (see his Scheherazade and Shahryar painting).

He also gave attention to architecture in the backgrounds as one of the Classical Art teaching he received in Europe.

His palette is persistently brown in most works, although had some occasionally blue in some of his early works (as in his Adam and Eve painting).
