= Toni Hassan =

Australian journalist, writer and emerging artist

- Born: 1972 (age 53–54)
- Education: Charles Sturt University
- Alma mater: Mackellar Girls High
- Occupation: Journalist

Toni Hassan (born 1972) is an Australian journalist, a writer with an interest in contemporary social issues, and emerging artist who works predominantly in painting.

== Biography ==
Hassan was born in South Africa, settling in Australia with her parents in the late 1970s. She attended Mackellar Girls High and completed a Bachelor of Arts, Communication at Charles Sturt University, before pursuing a career as a journalist with the Australian Broadcasting Corporation, The Canberra Times, Fairfax Media and Nine Newspapers.

In 2001, she was awarded a Walkley Award for her radio documentary "The Health of Asylum Seekers in Detention". Broadcast as part of the ABC's Health Report, Hassan explored the services available to asylum seekers and the implications of long-term detention. Hassan was also awarded a Human Rights Media Award by the Australian Human Rights Commission for excellence in journalism.

Hassan is an Adjunct Research Fellow with the Australian Centre for Christianity and Culture, Charles Sturt University. She is well-known for her ongoing interest in community development, government policy and human rights and contributes to the online public policy journal Pearls and Irritations.

Hassan is an emerging artist: her work has been influenced by her early years living in South Africa during the Soweto Riots, as well as ongoing issues of human trafficking and social justice. Hassan's social art practice can be seen as "an intersection of the secular and the sacred".

In 2018, she was awarded the ACT Legislative Assembly's Speaker's Emerging Artists Support Scheme Award (EASS). Her painting "Shifting ground and King Billy" is now in the collection of the Legislative Assembly of the ACT. The acrylic paintings depicts a "Wiradjuri man, Jimmy Clements, who walked for nearly a week to attend the opening of Australia's Federal Parliament in 1923" and the image is described as "being immediately recognisable as a reflection on race and power".

Her book, Families in the digital age, was highly commended in the Nonfiction section of the 2020 ACT Writing and Publishing Awards.

== Education ==
- 1990–1993, Bachelor of Arts, Communication, Charles Sturt University
- 2015–2018, Bachelor of Visual Arts, The Australian National University

== Publications ==
- Hassan, Toni (2019), Families in the digital age : every parent's guide, Hybrid Publishers, ISBN 978-1-925736-23-6

== Exhibitions ==
- 2021 "Together alone", Canberra Contemporary Art Space, Manuka
- 2020 "Stations of the Cross", Northmead Creative and Performing Arts High School, Northmead, NSW
- 2020 Fisher's Ghost Art Award, Campbelltown Arts Centre, Campbelltown, NSW
- 2018 "Alone together", ACT Legislative Assembly, Canberra

== Personal life ==
Hassan is married to economist, journalist and commentator Peter Martin.
