= Victor Hassine =

Victor Hassine (1956–2008) was a prisoner for over 20 years in the Pennsylvania state prison system who became a writer on crime and punishment. Born in Egypt and raised in Trenton, NJ, he was the author of Life without Parole: Living in Prison Today which includes stories of prison life, interviews with other prisoners and short essays about his personal views of the prison and criminal justice system in the United States.

His book, renamed Life without Parole: Living and Dying in Prison Today after his death, is used by many sociology, criminal justice, and social work professors to help teach American justice and social control; its fifth edition was released in 2010. Hassine, an intellectual who graduated from Dickinson College and New York Law School, offers a rare and intelligent insider's look at life in an American prison, including achievements and failures in the criminal justice system. Hassine's writings have been favorably reviewed by the New York Times and have garnered many awards, including two PEN America Literary Awards in 1991 and 1992 for non-fiction writing. He also wrote poetry about prison life, included in his collection The Crying Wall, published by WilloTrees Press in 2005.

== Arrest ==
Hassine was arrested for involvement in a conspiracy with George Gregory Orlowski and William Eric Decker which culminated in the August 22, 1980, murder of James Puerale and the shootings of Albert "Skip" Kellet and Lois Kellet.

The evidence at trial showed that Hassine first met Orlowski in 1979, and that shortly thereafter they decided to open a store in Morrisville, Pennsylvania, called Greg's Quality Meat Market ("the Market"). The store was financed by Hassine's family, overseen and supervised by Hassine himself, and operated on a daily basis by Orlowski. However, the Market soon experienced financial problems, and, with Hassine's knowledge, Orlowski began selling marijuana and methamphetamine from a back room in the store.

In June 1980, Albert Kellet, a close friend of Orlowski, purchased $150 of methamphetamine at the Market. Upon returning home, Kellet discovered that the drugs were of inferior quality and he became enraged. He called Orlowski and invited him to his apartment under the false pretense of wishing to buy more methamphetamine. When Orlowski arrived, Kellet threatened him with a club, stole all of his money and drugs, and threw him out of the apartment.

Several days later, Orlowski, Hassine, and Decker, among others, met at the Market to discuss Kellet's actions. The State's witnesses testified that at this meeting, Hassine announced that he wanted Kellet "wasted" and that if Lois Kellet, Albert's wife, was present, she "was to go also, because any witnesses had to go." As a result, Hassine, Decker, and Orlowski made several attempts over the next month to obtain a gun with which to kill Kellet, and they investigated the possibility of paying two other individuals to have Kellet murdered. A number of confrontations between Hassine and Kellet also erupted during this time, and, on at least one occasion, Hassine instructed Decker to shoot Kellet and to kill him. Because it was daylight and a witness was present, Decker declined. Nevertheless, on August 22, 1980, Decker had his own encounter with Kellet, and he returned to the Market to tell Hassine that "[t]onight's the night—the cat's got to go. We'll use your gun."

According to the State's witnesses, Hassine picked Decker up later that evening and drove him to Hassine's parents' house in Trenton, New Jersey. While Decker waited in the car, Hassine entered the house and obtained his father's .380 caliber Llama handgun. Hassine then drove Decker to Kellet's apartment building and gave him the gun and a New York Yankees batting helmet to cover his hair. As Decker approached the building, he saw Kellet in a first-floor apartment watching television with his wife Lois, along with James Puerale and George Sofield. Decker entered the apartment, surveyed the room, and opened fire, killing Puerale instantly and injuring Skip and Lois Kellet with shots to the head.

The police arrested Decker the next day, and arrested Hassine three months later, charging Hassine with first degree murder, attempted murder, conspiracy, and solicitation.

== Trial ==
The State presented thirty-four witnesses at Hassine's trial, including Decker, who had negotiated a plea bargain with the District Attorney to avoid the death penalty. Decker and the other witnesses testified as to the details of the murder conspiracy and described Hassine's extensive involvement in the plot to murder Kellet.

Hassine then took the stand in his own defense and, for the first time since his arrest, offered an innocent explanation for his role in the conspiracy. He testified that he had obtained his father's gun and stored it in the Market after Orlowski had asked him for protection from Kellet. He then claimed that Decker entered the Market on the day of the murder, and, without Hassine's knowledge, took the gun and left the store "ranting and raving, saying he was going to get Skip Kellet." Hassine thus maintained that he never told Decker to kill Kellet, that he never gave Decker a gun with which to carry out the crime, and that he was never part of the murder conspiracy.

Attempting to discredit these claims, the prosecutor asked Hassine a series of questions on cross-examination regarding Hassine's post-arrest silence. In particular, he inquired three times as to why Hassine had not offered the same exculpatory story to the authorities following his arrest. Hassine's attorney objected each time, believing that the questions violated Hassine's rights under Doyle v. Ohio, which provides that the government cannot use a defendant's post-arrest, post-Miranda silence for impeachment purposes at trial. The trial judge agreed, sustaining the objections and preventing Hassine from answering the prosecutor's questions. The prosecutor also made two general references to Hassine's silence in his closing argument. Nevertheless, the court did not provide curative instructions during Hassine's testimony or in the jury charge.

The case was sent to the jury at the close of all evidence, and on June 11, 1981, the jury found Hassine guilty and recommended that he be sentenced to life in prison on the charge of first degree murder. After denying Hassine's motions for a new trial and arrest of judgment, the court adopted the jury's recommendation and sentenced Hassine to life imprisonment, in addition to several consecutive prison terms extending from two to twenty years.

== Death ==
On April 27, 2008, Victor Hassine died while in prison in Pennsylvania under unusual circumstances. According to a memo prepared by the Pennsylvania Department of Corrections April 28, 2008, it appeared that he had hung himself.
