= Frederick Hassan =

Egyptian-born English cricketer

Personal information
- Born: 1859; Cairo, Egypt
- Died: 15 April 19940; Tooting Bec, England

Domestic team information
- Years: Team
- 1878: Erith
- 1879: Kent County Cricket Club

Frederick Hassan (1859 – 15 April 1940) was an Egyptian-born English cricketer who played in one first-class cricket match for Kent County Cricket Club in 1879.

Hassan was born at Cairo in 1859. (Note: The Wisden website gives a birth date of 30 November 1858, although this is not confirmed by any other source.) By 1876 he was living in the Dartford area of Kent and is known to have played for Dartford Albion Cricket Club in that year. He played as a bowler and produced some "impressive bowling performances".

In 1878 Hassan played for Erith against the touring United South of England Eleven, taking two wickets. The following year he took five wickets for Kent Colts against The Mote and, three weeks later, played his only first-class match, appearing for Kent against Marylebone Cricket Club (MCC) at Lord's in mid-June. He took one wicket in the match, but did not score a run in either Kent innings in a low scoring match that Kent lost. (Note: MCC scored 64 and 66 runs in their innings; Kent scored 55 and 25 in a match that lasted only two day.)

Although he did not play any further first-class cricket, Hassan, by this time living in East Ham, appeared in matches for South Essex in 1883 and for the Players of Essex in 1884. (Note: East Ham was part of Essex until 1965.) From 1886 he played regularly for Beckton Cricket Club, one of the strongest clubs in East London.

Hassan worked as an engineer and fitter and later as a sampler in the chemical industry. During the early years of the 20th century he ran a newsagents and tobacconists shop, first at North Woolwich before moving to Stoke Newington. The shop operated under his name until at least 1938, although he is believed to have retired to live with his daughter in Plumstead before this date. He died at Tooting Bec hospital in 1940 of myocardial degeneration. He was aged 81.

== Bibliography ==
- Carlaw, Derek (2020). Kent County Cricketers, A to Z: Part One (1806–1914) (PDF). Cardiff: ACS.
