= Amir Alexander Hasson =

- Born: Amir Alexander
- Occupation: social entrepreneur

Amir Alexander Hasson is a social entrepreneur and the founder of United Villages, an organization specializing in the deployment and usage of wireless networks, including cell phone networks, to rural areas of India through local shop owners. These networks have been used to provide supply management and general e-commerce to areas previously isolated. He was honored with the MIT Technology Review's TR35 award in 2010.

In 1998 Hasson graduated with honors from the College of Social Studies at Wesleyan University and in 2002 received his master's degree from the Sloan School of Management at MIT. "During his studies at MIT, Amir co-conceived and patented DakNet, a novel low-cost wireless networking technology for rural connectivity."
