= Jacques Hassoun =

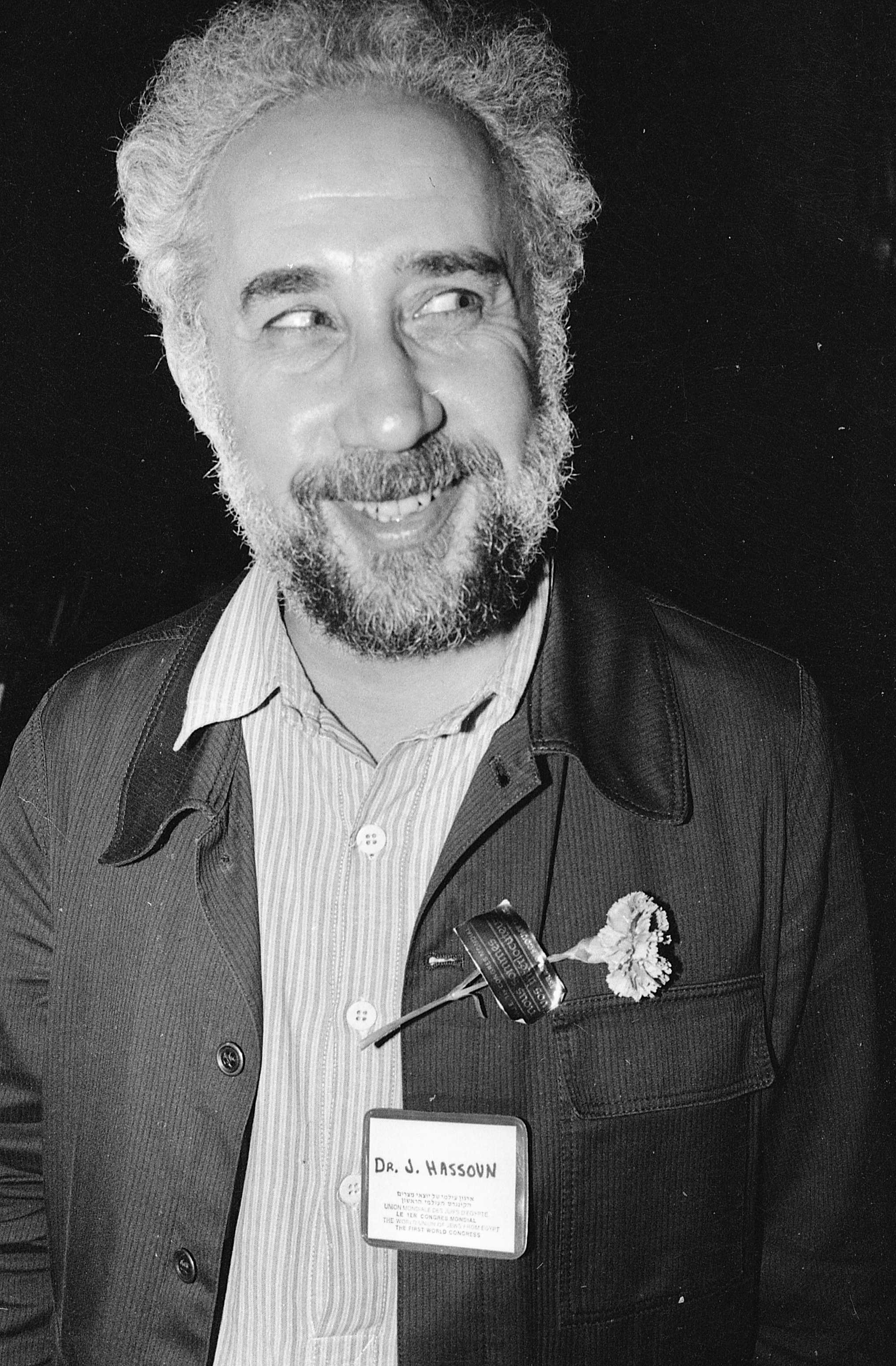
Jacques Hassoun, 1983

Jacques Hassoun (20 October 1936 – 24 April 1999) was a French psychoanalyst and proponent of the ideas of Jacques Lacan.

Hassoun developed a theory of depression and a reparative theory of transmission. He wrote about certain pathologies in children of immigrants. Hassoun examined the special problems they face in processing and transmitting what is mostly communicated to them through their parents' narratives of displacement, loss and exile. He was one of the first to evoke the heritage of the Jews of Egypt in modern times. He wrote about their history, customs, religious observance, and languages. He showed particular interest in the Karaite community.

Hassoun traveled to Egypt with groups of compatriots when Egyptian president Anwar Sadat made it possible for Jews to visit Egypt. Hassoun wrote several works on the history of the modern Jews of Egypt, among them Histoire des Juifs du Nil (Minerve, 1990), Alexandies et autres récits and Alexandries (a novel). He wrote eloquently of the culture of the Jews of Egypt and of their disappearance in the wake of Egyptian nationalism.

== Life ==
Hassoun was born in Alexandria, Egypt in 1936 to an observant, Arabic-speaking Egyptian Jewish family, although Hassoun himself was non-religious. He studied at the Lycee De L'Union Juive and joined Democratic Movement for National Liberation (HADETU), the largest of the illegal communist organizations in Egypt. He settled in France in 1954 at the age of 18, where he had been exiled after being accused and imprisoned by Egyptian authorities for communist activity. He remained in France for the rest of his life. Hassoun spoke French, Arabic, and Hebrew fluently.

Hassoun died from a brain tumor at age 63, in Paris.

== Theory of melancholy ==
For Hassoun, melancholy (or depression) stems from an individual's desire for some undesignated other.

In Hassoun's model, the mother's attentiveness at the moment of weaning is crucial to the infant's sense of self. The mother must be seen by the infant to mourn, disapprove, begrudge, hesitate in the process of weaning. If she does not, the infant will recognize the mother's gesture as indifference. Melancholy is the result of the infant's sensing the mother's indifference at the moment of separation. Henceforth, he will be unable to mourn, having been unable to recognize loss in the mother's eyes. Weaning is a mirroring that leaves the subject both unable to mourn and unable to care—leaves the child in the state of melancholy. Melancholy for Hassoun is the result of a gesture that leaves the infant to suffer interminably for having spied the mother's indifference at the moment of weaning.

== About memory and retelling ==
Hassoun said that the need to tell the past comes up when there's a crisis: when the individual grows up; when there's the urge to preserve a culture, etc. New facts means psychological effort to adapt, this can cause a person to reject that new things/ situation. People go back to the past when there's the need to adapt, because they consider experiences from the past a tool to survive.

Telling the past does not mean telling somebody to follow traditions. Traditions subject the individual to follow patterns which may cause more damage than good. Retelling the past is another thing. It is never pure repetition but interpretation. Transmission takes the present into consideration when turning one's attention to the past. Without transmission all we have is nostalgia.
