= Umar Hassan =

Eritrean military commander

Umar Hassan or Omar Hassan is current Commander of Operation Zone 3 for the African nation Eritrea. The country has five operation zones, each headed by a high-ranking military official. These zones overlap the six administrative regions. The power of the Operation Zone commanders supersedes that of the administrators who head the six regions.
