= Yaël Hassan =

French-Israeli writer (born 1952)

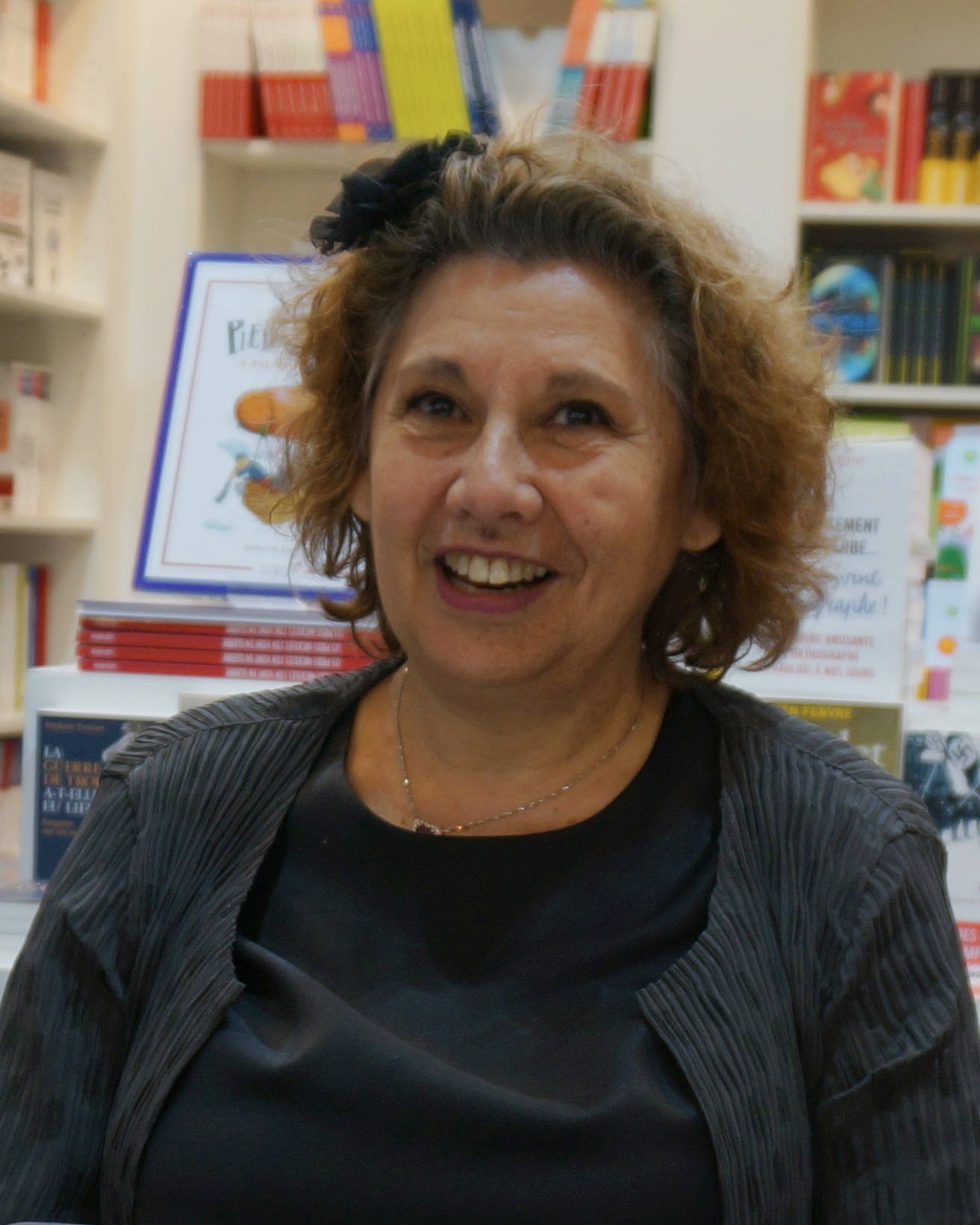
2015

Yaël Hassan is a French-Israeli writer born in Paris in 1952. She spent her childhood in Belgium, her adolescence in France, and her youth in Israel. She returned to France in 1984 with her family. Making the most of the time of a very long immobilization, she writes her first novel, A Grandfather Fallen from the Sky (in French Un grand-père tombé du ciel), which won the Youth Novel Prize (Prix du Roman Jeunesse) in 1996 from the Ministry of Youth and Sports, the Young Readers Grand Prize from PEEP in 1998 and the Sorceress Prize in 1998.

== Works ==
The works of Yaël Hassan, the most part edited by Casterman, deal in general with simplicity of the subjects of actuality (the list below is not exhaustive).

- La chataîgneraie
- Petit Roman Portable
- Etre Juif aujourd'hui (illustré par Olivier Ranson)
- Ni D'Eve ni d'avant
- Quand Anne riait
- Le Professeur de musique
- Alex
- De Sacha @ Macha (aussi écrit par Rachel Hausfater)
