= Isaac Cleto Hassan =

South Sudanese physician and politician, Minister of Health of Western Bahr el Ghazal

Isaac Cleto Hassan is a South Sudanese physician and politician. He has served as Minister of Health of Western Bahr el Ghazal since 18 May 2010.
