= Omar Said Al-Hassan =

Omar Said Al-Hassan is the Chairman of the Gulf Centre for Strategic Studies, a London-based think tank which gathers, and publishes information about the Persian Gulf states, and Arab issues in general.

== See also ==
- International relations
