= Jan Alam Hassani =

Afghan volleyball player (born 1956)

Jan Alam Hssani (born 8 August 1956) is an Afghan former volleyball player who was a member of the national team for more than ten years. Currently he is the Secretary General of the Afghanistan National Olympic Committee; and has served as the President of Afghanistan Athletic Federation for more than 25 years. He is a former president of the Afghanistan Sports Federation, serving during the 2007 and 2008 seasons.

== Early life ==
He was born on 8 August 1956 in Nangarhar Province. From his childhood he showed Interest in playing and taking part in Sports activities.

== Education ==
He finished his school in Afghanistan. He received degree in Physical Education from Punjabi University. He have an International Volleyball Coach degree from Germany. He also studied Sports division in Germany.
