= Hasania tribe =

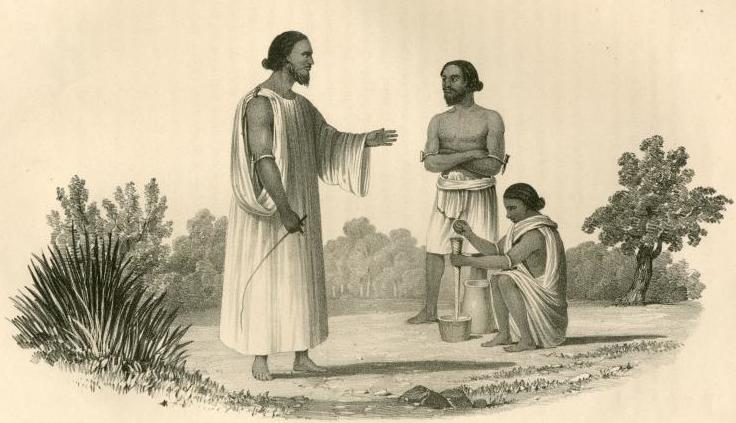
Hassania tribe in 19th century

Hasania (or Hassania) are members of a Muslim tribe of Arab origin. As of 1911, they were inhabitants of the desert between Merowe and the Nile at the 6th Cataract, and the left bank of the Blue Nile immediately south of Khartoum.
