= Omar Hassan (skateboarder) =

American skateboarder

Omar Hassan is a professional skateboarder from Costa Mesa, California. He has competed in numerous competitions, including the X Games.

He is sponsored by PRO-TEC, Black Label, Independent Trucks, Vans, Quiksilver, Ford, and Black Flys. He has been a professional skateboarder for 30 years.
