= Wajid Shamsul Hasan =

Pakistani diplomat (died 2021)

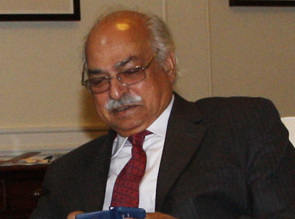
Hasan in 2010

Wajid Shamsul Hasan (died 28 September 2021) was a Pakistani diplomat since June 2008. He served as the High Commissioner of Pakistan to the United Kingdom.

== Family ==
Hasan belonged to Effendi family of Hyderabad also known as Akhund. He was married to Zarina Hasan.

== Cricket controversy ==
In response to the 2010 Pakistan cricket spot-fixing controversy, Hasan condemned the International Cricket Council for banning the three Pakistani players charged with spot-fixing.
