= Sayyid =

Nobility title in the Islamic world

Sayyid سَيِّد
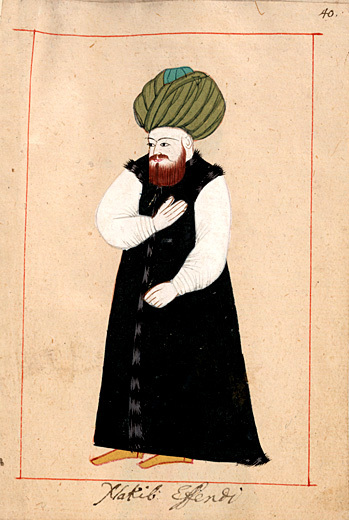
- In the Ottoman Empire, the Sayyids had the privilege of wearing a green turban

Total population
- Tens of millions

Regions with significant populations
- Muslim world

Religions
- Islam

Languages
- Arabic, Persian, Urdu, Bengali and others

Sayyid (Note: UK: /saɪɪd, ˈseɪjɪd/, US: /ˈsɑːjɪd/; Arabic: سيد [ˈsæjjɪd]; Persian: [sejˈjed]; meaning 'sir', 'Lord', 'Master'; Arabic plural: سادة sādah; feminine: سيدة sayyidah; Persian: [sejˈjede]) is an honorific title of Hasanid and Husaynid lineage, recognized as descendants of the Islamic prophet Muhammad through his daughter Fatima and Ali's sons Hasan and Husayn. The title may also refer to the descendants of the family of the Bani Hashim through Muhammad's great-grandfather Hashim, and others including Hamza, Abbas, Abu Talib, and Asad ibn Hashim.

See also Sharif, which has a good description of three types of identification for that term and co-relates to this term. In its narrowest sense, a sayyid is a descendant of Husayn ibn Ali, but the term is also more generally used for descendants of Muhammad.

== Etymology ==
The title Syed (Sayyid/Sayed) gains special significance in Islam through the hadith in which Muhammad said: "Al-Hasan and Al-Husayn are the two masters (Syeds) of the youth of Paradise" (الحسنُ والحسينُ سيِّدا شبابِ أهلِ الجنَّةِ). This hadith is recorded in Sahih al-Tirmidhi and other collections. Muhammad's use of the term "Syed" for his grandsons elevated the honorific, which later became widely used for the descendants of Muhammad through his daughter Fatima and her son Husayn ibn Ali, particularly through Ali al-Sajjad, symbolizing noble lineage and honored status.

A few Arabic language experts state that "Sayyid" has its roots in the word al-asad الأسد, meaning "lion", probably because of the qualities of valor and leadership. The word is derived from the verb sāda, meaning to rule. The title seyyed/sayyid/syed/sayyad/saeed/said existed before Islam, however not in light of a specific descent, but as a meritocratic sign of respect.

Hans Wehr's Dictionary of Modern Written Arabic defines seyyid as a translation for master, chief, sovereign, or lord. It also denotes someone respected and of high status.

In the Arab world, sayyid is the equivalent of the English word "liege lord" or "master".

== Origin of the title ==
The title Syed (Sayyid/Sayed) is a genealogical honorific for Muhammad's descendants whose formal use emerged in the early Islamic period shortly after Muhammad's death in 632 CE, becoming established during the 7th century through the descendants of Husayn ibn Ali, particularly through Ali al-Sajjad. A later title, Sharif, often linked to the genealogy of Hasan ibn Ali, developed stronger political connotations from around the 10th century onward under the Fatimid Caliphate, particularly in the context of the Sharifate of Mecca.

The foundation of the title Sayyid is unclear. In fact the title Sayyid as a unified reference for descendants of Muhammad did not exist, according to Morimoto Kazuo, until the Mongol conquests. This can be substantiated by historic records about Abdul Qadir Gilani and Baha' al-Din Naqshband, who did not refer to themselves with any title, despite their lineages to Muhammad. Sometimes the ruling community of a nation took this title to portray themselves as respected and honored, though they are not actually the descendants of Muhammad. This gives reasons to think that this title is founded later on. Morimoto refers to Mominov, who describes that the emergence of a community leader during the Mongol era (Ilkhanate) gave rise to the prominence of the title Sayyid. This leader is most probably the Sunni Shafi'ite scholar Mir Sayyid Ali Hamadani, who lived in this time, being known as a saint credited with the honorific titles "Amir-e-Kabir" (English: "Grand Prince") and "Ali-e-Sani" (English: "Second Ali"). Hamadani's religious legacy in Kashmir as well as his headquarter (Persian: Khanqah) the Khanqa-e-Mola became under the control of the Grand Sayyid Hazrat Ishaan. Hazrat Ishaan's descendants are buried in Hamadani's headquarters, on which occasion it is known as the Ziyarat Naqshband Sahab today.

However, in Sunni Islam as practiced in the Ottoman and Mughal Empire, a person descending from Muhammad (either maternally or paternally) can only claim the title of Sayyid meritocratically by passing audits, whereupon exclusive rights, like paying lesser taxes, will be granted. These are mostly based on the claimant's demonstrated knowledge of the Quran and piousness (Arabic: Taqwa) under the assessment of a Naqib al-Ashraf, also known as a Mir in Persian-speaking countries. Notable examples of such a Naqib (plural: "Nuqaba") or Mirs (plural: "Miran"), were Hazrat Ishaan in the Mughal Empire and his descendant Sayyid Mir Fazlullah Agha in Royal Afghanistan.

== West Asia ==
Men belonging to the Sayyid families or tribes in the Arab world used to wear white or ivory-coloured daggers like jambiyas, khanjars or shibriyas to demarcate their nobility amongst other Arab men, although this custom has been restricted due to the local laws of the variously divided Arab countries.

=== Iraq ===
The Sayyid families in Iraq are so numerous that there are books written especially to list the families and connect their trees. These families include: the Al-Talqani, Al-Habbobi, Al-Yassiri, Al-Aqiqi, Al-Nasrullah, Al-Wahab, Al-Hashimi, Al-Quraishi, Al-Mar'ashi, Al-Witri, Al-Zaidi, Al-A'araji, Al-Baka, Al-Hasani, Al-Hussaini, Al-Shahristani, Al-Qazwini Al-Qadri, Tabatabaei, Al-Alawi, Al-Ghawalib (Al-Ghalibi), Al-Musawi, Al-Awadi (not to be confused with the Al-Awadhi Huwala family), and many others.

=== Iran ===
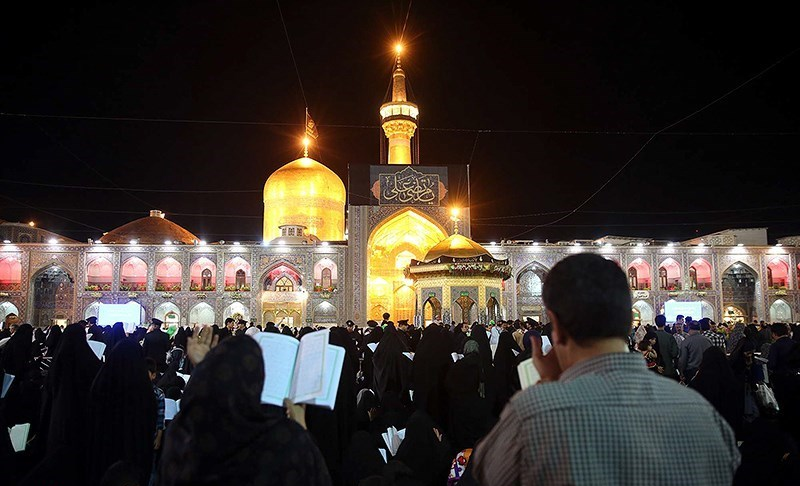
Mausoleum of Imam Ali al-Rida

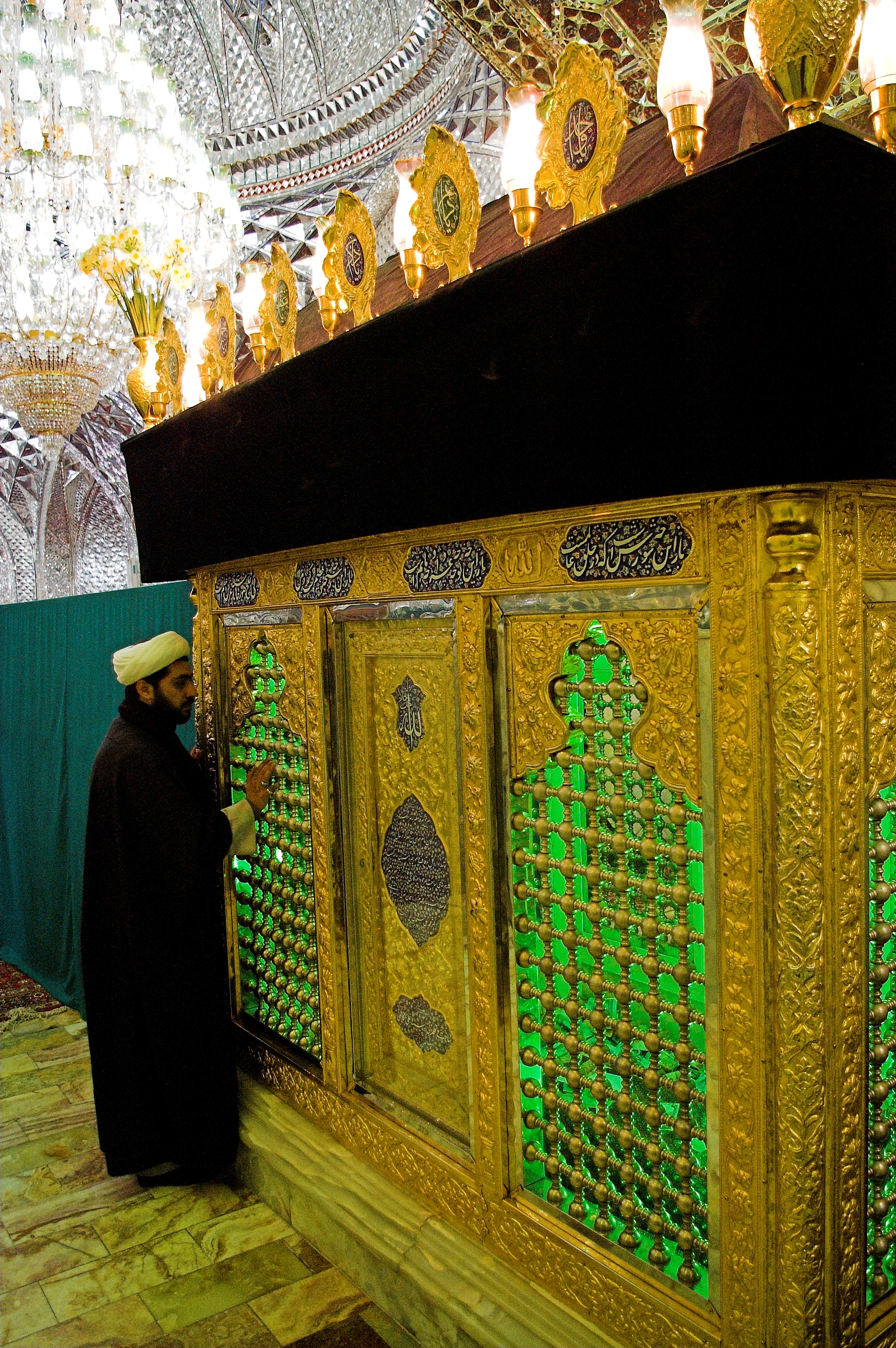
Mausoleum of Imamzadeh Sayyid Hamza bin Musa al Kazim

Sayyids (Persian: سید, romanized: Seyyed) are found in vast numbers in Iran. The Chief of "National Organization for Civil Registration" of Iran declared that more than 6 millions of Iranians are Sayyid. The majority of Sayyids migrated to Iran from Arab lands predominantly in the 15th to 17th centuries during the Safavid era. The Safavids transformed the religious landscape of Iran by imposing Twelver Shi'ism on the populace. Since most of the population embraced Sunni Islam, and an educated version of Shiism was scarce in Iran at the time, Ismail imported a new group of Shia Ulama who predominantly were Sayyids from traditional Shiite centers of the Arabic-speaking lands, such as Jabal Amil (of southern Lebanon), Syria, Bahrain, and southern Iraq in order to create a state clergy. The Safavids offered them land and money in return for loyalty. These scholars taught Twelver Shi'ism, made it accessible to the population, and energetically encouraged conversion to Shi'ism.

During the reign of Shah Abbas the Great, the Safavids also imported to Iran more Arab Shias, predominantly Sayyids, built religious institutions for them, including many Madrasas (religious schools), and successfully persuaded them to participate in the government, which they had shunned in the past (following the Hidden imam doctrine).

Common Sayyid family surnames in Iran are Husseini, Mousavi, Kazemi, Razavi, Eshtehardian, Tabatabaei, Hashemi, Hassani, al-Ja'fari, Emami, Arabi, Ahmadi, Zaidi, Imamzadeh, Sherazi, Kirmani, Shahidi, and Mahdavi.

=== Oman ===
In Oman, Sayyid is used solely as a royal title and not as a means of indicating descent from Muhammad. It is used by members of the ruling Al Bu Said family who are not descended from Muhammad but instead from the Azd, a Qahtanite tribe. All male line descendants of Sultan Ahmad bin Said, the first ruler of Oman from the Al Bu Said dynasty, are able to use the title of Sayyid or Sayyida. Male line descendants of Sultan Turki bin Said are also able to use the style of His/Her Highness. The Sayyid title in Oman is some times translated as Prince.

=== Yemen ===
In Yemen the Sayyids are more generally known as sadah; they are also referred to as Hashemites. In terms of religious practice they are Sunni, Shia, and Sufi. Sayyid families in Yemen include the Rassids, the Qasimids, the Mutawakkilites, the Hamideddins, some Al-Zaidi of Marib, Sanaa, and Saada, the Ba 'Alawi sadah families in Hadhramaut, Mufadhal of Sanaa, Al-Shammam of Saada, the Sufyan of Juban, and the Al-Jaylani of Juban.

== Central/South Asia ==
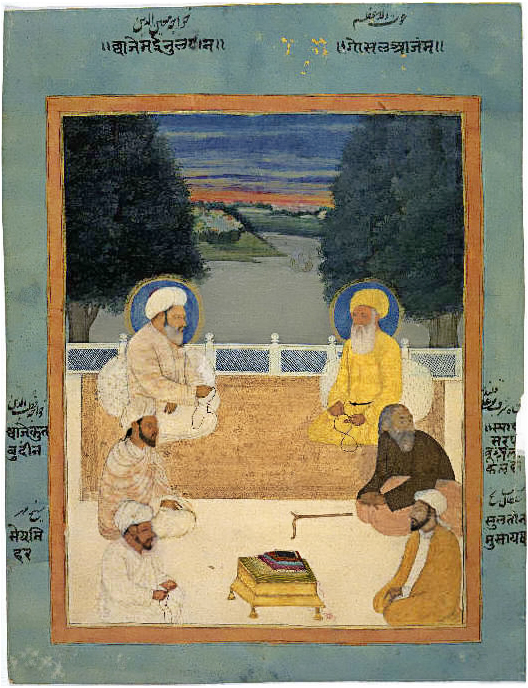
Portrait of leading Sayyids who promoted Islam in The Indian subcontinent

In South Asia, Sayyids are mostly credited for preaching and consolidating the religion of Islam. They are predominantly descendants of leading saints of Sunni Islam that migrated from Persia to preach Islam in Islamic Theology.

=== Afghanistan ===
In the Islamic Republic of Afghanistan, the Sayyid have been recognized as an ethnic group. On March 15, 2019, President Ashraf Ghani decreed the inclusion of the Sadat tribe in the electronically registered national identity documents (Tadhkira). The majority of Sayyids live in Balkh and Kunduz in the north, as well as in Nangarhar in the east. They are predominantly Sunni Muslims^{[citation needed]}, although there are some, including in Bamyan Province, who belong to Shia Islam. These individuals are often referred to as Sadat (from Arabic: سادات, the plural of Sayyid), a term traditionally used to denote the descendants of Hasan and Hussein, the first Shia martyrs and sons of Ali, who are grandsons of Muhammad, particularly in the northern Hejaz region and British India.

=== North India ===
The earliest migration of Sayyids from Afghanistan to North India took place in 1032 when Ghazi Saiyyad Salar Sahu (general and brother-in-law of Sultan Mahmud of Ghazni) and his son Ghazi Saiyyad Salar Masud established their military headquarters at Satrikh (16 km (9.9 mi) from Zaidpur) in the Barabanki district of Uttar Pradesh. They are considered to be the first Muslim settlers in North India. In 1033 Ghazi Saiyyad Salar Masud was killed at the battle of Bahraich, the location of his mazar. Ghazi Saiyyad Salar Masud had no children. His parental uncle Sayyid Ma'ruf al-Din Ghazi and his family lived in Tijara until 1857 before they migrated to Bhopal in Madhya Pradesh. Syed Ahmed Rizvi Kashmiri and Khan Bahadur Aga Syed Hussain were both Rizvi Sayyids through Aqa Mir Sayyid Hussain Qumi Rizvi, whose sacred shrine is in the Zainagir Village of Sopore, Jammu and Kashmir. Iraqi Sayyids or Iraqi Biradri in Purvanchal are descendants of Sayyid Masud Al Hussaini who was the direct descendant of Muhammad's grandson Husayn ibn Ali and came to India from Iraq during the reign of Sultan Muhammad bin Tughlaq in 1330 CE. He settled with his seven sons and forty champions in Ghazipur as some of them (i.e., Syed Abu Bakr in Nonahra, Ghazipur) converted to Sunni Islam in the reign of Sultan Ibrahim Lodhi around 1517 CE. His Shia descendants are now known as Sayyids of Ghazipur.

Sayyids of Syed Nagli, or the Baquari Syeds had migrated from Termez (Present day Uzbekistan) during the Sultanate era. Sikandar Khan Lodi was the ruler of Delhi when Mir Syed Muhammad al-Hussain al-Hussaini al-Termezi Haji al-Haramain came to India and settled at Syed Nagli. He was a Baquari Syed who drew his lineage from Muhammad al-Baqir.

Perhaps the most important figure in the history of the Sayyid in Uttar Pradesh was Sayyid Basrullah Shustari, who moved from Mashhad in Iran in 1549 and joined the court of the Mughal Emperor Akbar. Akbar appointed Shustari as his chief justice, who used his position to strengthen the status of the various Sayyid families. They were preferred in administrative posts and formed a privileged elite. When the Mughal Empire disintegrated, the Sayyid played an important role in the turbulent politics of the time. The new British colonial authorities that replaced the Mughals after the Battle of Buxar made a pragmatic decision to work with the various Sayyid jagirdars. Several Sayyid taluqdars in Awadh were substantial landowners under the British colonial regime, and many other Sayyid contributed to state administration. After the abolition of the zamindari system, many Sayyid zamindars (e.g. that of Ghazipur) had to leave their homes.

==== Uttar Pradesh ====
The ancestor of the Bārha Sayyids, Sayyid Abu Al-Farah Al-Hussaini Al-Wasti, left his original home in Wasit, Iraq, with his twelve sons at the end of the 13th century and migrated to India, where he obtained four villages in Sirhind-Fategarh. By the 16th century Abu'l Farah's descendants had taken over Bārha villages in Muzaffarnagar.

The Sayyids of Abdullapur, Meerut are descendants of great saint Jalaluddin Surkh-Posh Bukhari. They had a large Jagirdara consisting of 52 villages. Abdullapur named after Syed Mir Abdulla Naqvi Al-Bukhari, he built Kot Fort of this place in the 16th century, it was his main residence. Bukhari of Abdullapur are fractionate into Kannauji Bukhari and Jalal Bukhari. Kannauji's are descendants of Jalaludin Haider through Syed Mehboob Alam Naqvi-ul Bukhari Al-Maroof Shah Jeewna or Shah Jeewna son of warrior and chief advisor of Sikandar Khan Lodi. Famous writer Syed Qudrat Naqvi Al-Bukhari was born here later migrated to Pakistan after partition, his famous books are Ghālib Kaun Hai, Asās-e-Urdu, Ghālib-e-Sad Rang, Sīrat an-Nabi, Hindi-Urdu Lughat, Mutal'a-e-Abd al-Haq, Lisānī Maqalāt.

The Sayyids of Safipur are Hussaini Sayyids. They are descendants of great saint Makhdoom Shah Ala Jajmawi Zanjani (He Was born in Zanjan in 1175). His father was first migrated from Zanjan, Iran to India his name was Qazi Siraj al-Din Hasan Zanjani. He was the chief qazi of Zanjan, Iran.

The Sayyids of Bilgram are Hussaini Sayyids, who first migrated from Wasit, Iraq, in the 13th century. Their ancestor, Syed Mohammad Sughra, a Zaidi Sayyid of Iraq, arrived in India during the rule of Sultan Iltutmish. In 1217–18 the family conquered and settled in Bilgram.

A notable Sufi that belonged to a Sayyid family was Syed Salar Masud, from whom many of the Sayyid families of Awadh claim their lineage. Sayyids of Salon (Raebareli), Jarwal (Bahraich), Kintoor (Barabanki), and Zaidpur (Barabanki) were well-known Taluqadars (feudal lords) of Awadh.

Sadaat also found in Kannauj trace their lineage from Husayn through Ali al-Hadi, a branch of Naqvi Bukhari. Famous Pir Syed Mehboob Alam Naqvi-ul Bukhari Al-Maroof Shah Jewna son of great warrior Syed Sadaruddin Shah Kabeer Naqvi (saint and also chief advisor) of Sikandar Lodi was also born in Kannauj and spent 66 years of his life in kannauj later moved to Shah Jeewna. Makhdoom Jahaniya Mosque is still present in Shikana, Kannauj. Nawab Siddiq Hasan Khan was also from Kannauj, he is a Bukhari Naqvi Sayyid converted from Shi'a Islam to Sunni Islam in the early 1800s.

==== Bihar ====
There are different families of Syeds in Bihar who belong to direct descendants of Imam Hasan and Imam Hussain. Mostly there are Hussaini (Rizvi, Zaidi, Baqri) along with Hasani (Malik, Quadri or Geelani). Sadaat are settled in different part of Bihar including Shi'a and Sunni sects. They are mostly migrated to bihar from Iraq and Iran.

Syed Yaqub Halabi also known as Syed Yaqub Baghdadi, a Hanafi Qazi from the Nizamiyya of Baghdad, originally from Halab (Aleppo) who travelled to India with Muhammad of Ghor after the Second Battle of Tarain. He was an eleventh generational descendant of Ali ibn Husayn Zayn al-Abidin through his son Abd Allah Al Bahr Al Ilm.

Sharafuddin Yahya Maneri belongs to Banu Hashim family of Imam Taj Faqih. In Bihar, Sayyids were landlords, judges, barristers, intellectuals, civil servant, clerics, teachers, businessmen and farmers. Sufi Saint and a warrior Malik Ibrahim Bayu who conquered Bihar during the time of Tughlaqs is one the most famous personality in Bihar. Bihar's first prime minister Mohammad Yunus Nobel Prize nominee and Padma Shri winner Syed Hassan, Political Scientist Abu Bakr Ahmad Haleem was the Pro-Vice Chancellor of Aligarh Muslim University and University of Karachi, The great Abdul Bari, Zaid Hamid Syed Zaid Zaman Hamid is a Pakistani far-right, Islamist political commentator and was included in 500 most influential Muslims in world and Brigadier Malik Mokhtar Karim are few names from Malik Sada'at of Bihar.

Zaidi Sada'at of Bihar are the descendants of Sufi saint Syed Ahmad Jajneri and Syed Mohammed Jajneri. Syed Ahmad Jajneri migrated to India from Baghdad during the reign of Muhammad of Ghor and later migrated to Bihar. He was the direct descendant of Zayd ibn Ali who was the grandson of Husayn ibn Ali and therefore his descendants are called Husseini (Zaidi) Sada'at. His descendants are mostly settled in Bihar Sharif, Munger, Sheikhpura and Jamui region of Bihar.

Most prominent personalities of Sadaat of Bihar were from Desna, Bihar. For Example Syed Mohammed Saeed Raza, Abdul Qavi Desnavi and Sulaiman Nadvi. Desna's library, established in 1892, had thousands of old Persian and Urdu manuscripts. After the partition of India, during uncertain times of mass emigration to Pakistan, the books were donated to Khuda Bakhsh Khan Library in Patna, where a Desna section was established to house these treasures. Other famous personalities of Bihari Syed were Syed Sultan Ahmed, Syed Hasan Imam and his brother Syed Ali Imam.

==== Kerala ====
In Kerala, a number of Sayyid families (Qabila) are found. Most of them migrated from Arabian peninsula (Yemen's Hadharamout) and Central Asian region in the Middle Ages and settled under the patronage of Zamorins. Famous among are Jifris, Bukharis and Ba-Alawis.

Sayyids occupy various positions as jurists (qazi), scholars (ulama') and leaders (umara'). The state leaders of Indian Union Muslim League and Samastha are mostly chosen from Panakkad Thangal Family. A religious educational institute named 'Sadath Academy' was established in Kerala exclusively for Sayyid students by Ma'din Academy led by Sayyid Khaleelul Bukhari Thanghal.

=== Genetic studies and controversy of self-proclaimed Indian Sayyids ===
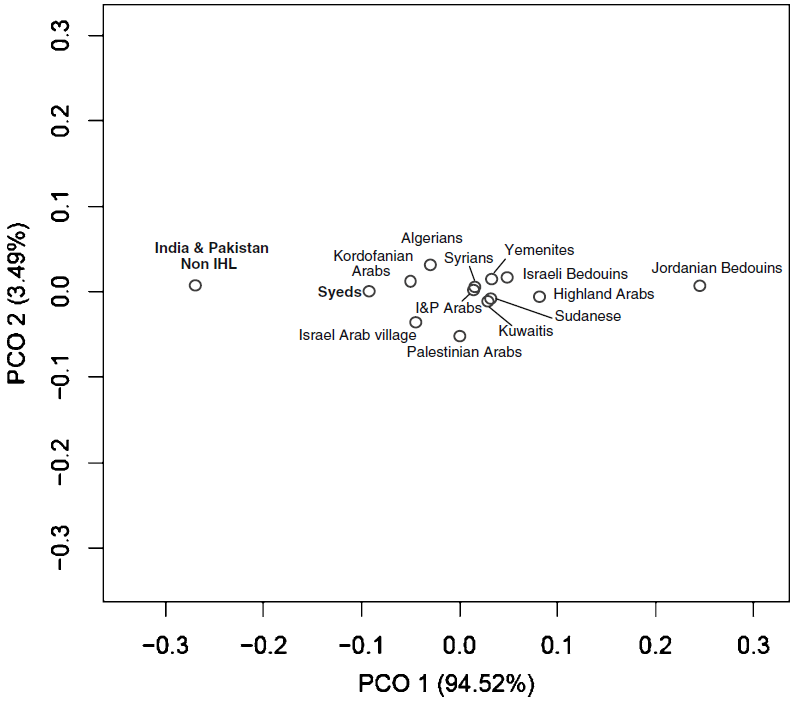
Classical multidimensional scaling based on R_{ST} genetic distances showing the genetic affinities of the Syeds with their non-IHL (Islamic honorific lineages) neighbours from India and Pakistan (both in bold characters) and with various other Arab populations

The authors of the study, the Y chromosomes of self-identified Syeds from the Indian sub-continent are no less diverse than those non-Syeds from the same regions, suggested that Syed status showed evidence of elevated Arab ancestry but not of a recent common patrilineal origin.

In Northern India, Uttar Pradesh & Bihar 0.2 per cent of the Sunni Muslim belong to haplogroup J1, which, given its absence in Indian non-Muslims is likely of exogenous Middle Eastern origin. There are 18 per cent belonging mainly to haplogroup J2 and another 11 per cent belong to haplogroup J1, which both represent Middle Eastern lineages, but may not hint exact descent from Muhammad. J1 is exclusively Near Eastern. The results for Sayyids showed minor but still detectable levels of gene flow primarily from Iran, rather than directly from the Arabian peninsula.

The paper, "Y chromosomes of self-identified Syeds from the Indian subcontinent", by Elise M. S. Belle, Saima Shah, Tudor Parfitt, and Mark G. Thomas showed that "self-identified Syeds had no less genetic diversity than those non-Syeds from the same regions, suggesting that there is no biological basis to the belief that self-identified Syeds in this part of the world share a recent common ancestry. However, self-identified men belonging to the IHL (Syeds, Hashemites, Quraysh and Ansari) show greater genetic affinity to Arab populations—despite the geographic distance, than other Indian populations.

== Southeast Asia ==
Most of the Alawi Sayyids who moved to Southeast Asia were descendants of Ali ibn Husayn Zayn al-Abidin, especially of Ba 'Alawi sada, many of which were descendants of migrants from Hadhramaut. Even though they are only "alleged" descendants of Husayn, it is uncommon for the female Sayyids to be called Sayyidah; they are more commonly called Sharifah. Most of them live in Brunei, Indonesia, Malaysia, Singapore, Bangsamoro Autonomous Region in Philippines, Pattani in Thailand, and Cambodia. Many of the royal families of this region such as the previous royal families of the Philippines (Sultanate of Sulu, Sultanate of Maguindanao, Confederation of Sultanates of Ranao), Country of Singapore (Sultanate of Singapore House of Bendahara), Country of Malaysia (Sultanates of Johor House of Temenggong, Sultanates of Pahang and Sultanates of Terengganu House of Bendahara, Kingdom of Perlis House of Jamalullail (Perlis), Country of Indonesia (Sultanates of Siak, Sultanates of Pontianak, Sultanates of Gowa, some Javanese Sultanates), Country of Brunei (Sultanates of Brunei House of Bolkiah) are also Sayyids, especially of Ba'Alawi.

Some common surnames of these Sayyids are Alsaqqaf (or Assaqqaf, Assegaf, Assegaff, Alsagoff), Shihab (or Shahab), Alaidarous (or Alaydrus, Alaidrus, House of Bendahara, House of Temenggong), Alhabsyi (or Alhabshi), Alkaff, Alaththos (or Alattas, Alattos), Alhadad Alhaddad, Aljufri (or Aljifri), Almuhdhar, Alshaikh Abubakar, Alqadri, Almunawwar, (Alakbar Alhasani, Al-Bolkiah, House of Bolkiah), Jamalullail or Aljamalullail, Djamalullail, (House of Jamalullail (Perlis) and House of Jamalullail (Perak)).

== Teseyyüd ==
In the Ottoman Empire, tax breaks for the People of the House encouraged many people to buy certificates of descent or forge genealogies; the phenomenon of teseyyüd – falsely claiming noble ancestry – spread across ethnic, class, and religious boundaries. In the 17th century, an Ottoman bureaucrat estimated that there were 300,000 impostors. In 18th-century Anatolia, nearly all upper-class urban people claimed descent from Muhammad.

== Royal descendants of Muhammad ==
Descendants of Muhammad are present in many royal families today and are predominantly of Sunni faith.

=== Libyan royal family ===
The Sayyids in Libya are Sunni, including the former royal family, which is originally Zaidi-Moroccan (also known as the Senussi family). The El-Barassa Family are Ashraf as claimed by the sons of Abdulsalam ben Meshish, a descendant of Hassan ibn Ali ibn Abi Talib.

=== Sharifs of Mecca ===
==== Jordan ====
The Hashemite royal family of Jordan also claims descent from Muhammad in the line of the Sharifs of Mecca, vassals that were set by the Fatimids and recognized by the Ottomans, tracing their lineage back to Imam Hasan ibn Ali. The Hashemite Royal Family under Sharif Hussein ibn Ali was crucial in ending Ottoman rule in the Arabian Peninsula, on the occasion of the spread of Pan-Turkism in the Arabian Peninsula.

==== Brunei ====
The House of Bolkiah claims descent from Imam Hasan ibn Ali through Sharif Ali, the 3rd Sultan of Brunei, who succeeded his father in law as Sultan in virtue of his descent from Muhammad. Sharif Ali formerly served as Emir of Makkah and belonged to the Sherifians, migrating to Brunei for missionary purposes.

=== Moroccan royal family ===
The Alaouite Royal family of Morocco also claims descent from Muhammad in the line of Hasan ibn Ali. Their patriarch was Sharif ibn Ali, who founded the dynasty.

=== Sulu, Lanao, and Maguindanao royal family ===
The Sultanates of Sulu, Lanao, and Maguindanao hold a significant place in Philippine history, rooted deeply in both cultural heritage and religious identity. It is claimed that these Sultanates trace their lineage to Muhammad, upholding the tenets of Sunni Ash'ari in 'Aqida (theological creed) and adhering to the Shafi'i school of thought in Fiqh (jurisprudence). Central to their spiritual and intellectual tradition are the teachings of Sufi missionaries from the Ba 'Alawi sada, whose influence has played a pivotal role in shaping the religious landscape of the region.

The majority of Muslims in the Philippines adhere to the Sunni Ash'ari creed and follow the Shafi'i school of jurisprudence, reflecting the enduring influence of these traditions within the Sultanates and beyond. Furthermore, there exists a profound respect for, and in many cases, the practice of Sufism among Filipino Muslims. Sufism, with its emphasis on spiritual purification and the pursuit of inner knowledge, resonates deeply with the cultural and religious fabric of the Filipino Muslim community.

== Other indication of descent ==
In addition to the sayyid title, descendants of Muhammad through the Twelve Imams in Arabic, Persian and Urdu may obtain the following surnames:

Ancestor	Arabic style	Arabic last name	Persian last name	Urdu last name
Ali ibn Abi Talib	al-Alawi العلوی او الهاشمی	al-Alawi العلوی or al-Hashimi الهاشمي	Alawi or Alavi	Alvi or Awan or Hashemi
Hasan ibn Ali	al-Hasani الحسني او الهاشمي	al-Hasani الحسني or al-Bolkiah البلقية or al-Alawi العلوی or al-Hashimi الهاشمي	Hashemi هاشمی or Hassani حسنى	Hashmi ہاشمی or Hassani حسنی or Noshahi نوشاہی
Husayn ibn Ali	al-Hussaini^{1} الحُسيني	al-Hussaini الحسيني or Ba 'Alawi ال باعلوي	Hussaini حسيني	Hussaini حسيني Hashemi or Shah
Ali ibn Husayn Zayn al-Abidin	al-Abidi العابدي	al-Abidi العابدي	Abedi عابدى	Abidi or Abdi عابدی
Muhammad al-Baqir	al-Baqiri الباقري	al-Baqiri الباقري	Baqiri/Bagheri باقری	Baqri باقری
Ja'far al-Sadiq	al-Ja'fari الجعفري	al-Ja'fari الصدق او الجعفري	Jafari جعفرى or Dibaji دیباجی	Jafri or Jafry جعفری or Jaffery Shamsi جعفری‌شمسی
Zayd ibn Ali	az-Zaidi الزيدي	al-Zaydi الزيدي	Zaydi زیدی	Zaidi زیدی
Musa al-Kadhim	al-Moussawi الموسوي او الكاظمي	al-Moussawi or al-Kadhimi الموسوي او الكاظمي	Moosavi or Kazemi موسوى / کاظمى	Kazmi کاظمی
Ali al-Ridha	ar-Radawi الرضوي	al-Ridawi or al-Radawi الرضوي	Rizvi or Rezvi رضوى	Rizvi or Rizavi رضوی
Muhammad at-Taqi	at-Taqawi التقوي	al-Taqawi التقوي	Taqavi تقوى	Taqvi تقوی
Ali al-Hadi	an-Naqawi النقوي	al-Naqawi النقوي or al-Bukhari البخاري or al-Qasimi القاسمی	Naqavi/Naghavi نقوى	Naqvi نقوی or Bhaakri/Bukhari بھاکری/بخاری
Hasan al-Askari	al-Askari العسکري	al-Askari العسکري	Sadat سادات Dakik دقيق or Hazrat Ishaan حضرت ایشان	Daqiq دقيق or Hazrat Ishaan حضرت ایشان
Note: (For non-Arabic speakers) When transliterating Arabic words into English there are two approaches.: 1. The user may transliterate the word letter for letter (e.g., "الزيدي" becomes "a-l-z-ai-d-i").; 2. The user may transcribe the pronunciation of the word (e.g., "الزيدي" becomes "a-zz-ai-d-i"); in Arabic grammar, some consonants (n, r, s, sh, t and z) cancel the l (ل) from the word "the" al (ال) (see sun and moon letters). When the user sees the prefixes an, ar, as, ash, at, az, etc... this means the word is the transcription of the pronunciation.; An i, wi (Arabic), or i, vi (Persian) ending could perhaps be translated by the English suffixes -ite or -ian. The suffix transforms a personal name or place name into the name of a group of people connected by lineage or place of birth. Hence Ahmad al-Hassani could be translated as Ahmad, the descendant of Hassan, and Ahmad al-Manami as Ahmad from the city of Manama. For further explanation, see Arabic names.^{1}Also, El-Husseini, Al-Husseini, Husseini, and Hussaini.^{2}Those who use the term Sayyid for all descendants of Ali ibn Abi Talib regard Allawis or Alavis as Sayyids. However, Allawis are not descendants of Muhammad, as they are descended from the children of Ali and the women he married after the death of Fatima, such as Umm ul-Banin (Fatima bint Hizam). Those who limit the term Sayyid to descendants of Muhammad through Fatima, Alawites are the same how Sayyids.

== See also ==
- Family tree of Muhammad
- Sharif
- Siddiqui
- Malik
- Mir
- Naqib
- Mirza (title)
- Ba'Alawi Sada
- Taqbil
- Ngwenyama (a title from Africa also meaning "lion" but in a honorific sense)

== Sources ==
- Van Arendonk, C.; Graham, W.A. (1960–2007). "Sharīf". In Bearman, P. J.; Bianquis, Th.; Bosworth, C. E.; van Donzel, E.; Heinrichs, W. P. (eds.). Encyclopaedia of Islam, Second Edition.
- whyislam.org content
