= Al-Awadi =

Al-Awadi, Al-Awadhi or Al-Awady (العوضي) is an Arabic surname. Notable people with the surname include:

- Abdul Rahman Al-Awadi (1936–2019), Kuwaiti doctor, politician, and government minister
- Abdulwahab Al-Awadi (born 2002), Kuwaiti footballer
- Abdulwahed Al-Awadhi (born 1955), Kuwaiti politician
- Ali Hussain Al-Awadhi (born 1974), Kuwaiti journalist and politician
- Amal Al-Awadhi (born 1989), Kuwaiti actress and TV presenter
- Aseel al-Awadhi (born 1969), Kuwaiti politician
- Diaa Al-Awady (1979–2026), Egyptian physician and influencer
- Fawaz Al-Awadhi (born 1985), Kuwaiti lawyer and businessman
- Hessa Al-Awadi (born 1956), Qatari poet and short story writer
- Hussein Al-Awadi (born 1944), Iraqi politician
- Khaled Al-Awadhi (born 1964), Kuwaiti fencer
- Lulwa Al Awadhi (fl. from the 1970s), Bahraini women's rights advocate
- Mousa Al-Awadi (born 1985), Jordanian basketball player
- Nabil Al Awadi (born 1970), Kuwaiti writer, humanitarian, and television presenter
- Najla Faisal Al Awadhi (fl. early 21st century), Emirati politician
- Omar Al-Awadhi (born 1982), Emirati tennis player
- Salman Al-Awadhi (born 2001), Kuwaiti soccer player
- Yasser Al-Awadi (1978–2021), Yemeni politician

== See also ==
- Awadi
- Awadis
