= Mohammad Alavi =

Mohammad Alavi is the name of:

- Mohammad Alavi (nuclear engineer), Iranian nuclear engineer
- Mohammad Alavi (footballer) (born 1982), Iranian footballer
- Mohammad Alavi (game developer), Iranian video game developer
- Mohammad Alavi Gorgani (1940–2022), Iranian Twelver shi'a marja

== See also ==
- Alavi (surname)
