= Alawi =

Alawi (Arabic: علوي), also transliterated as Alevi, Alevi, Alavi, Alvi, Alawid, or Alawite (French: Alaouite), is an adjective denoting "of or related to Ali", the Prophet Muhammad's cousin. As a proper noun it is used by individuals, dynasties, places, and religious sects and organizations who identify as being either descendants or followers of Ali. It may refer to:

== Places ==
- Alawi (sheikhdom), a historic principality in Yemen
- Alawi Sultanate, the pre-colonial state in Morocco ruled by the Alawi dynasty
- Alawite State, a French mandate territory in the coastal area of present-day Syria
- Alavi, Iran (disambiguation), places in Iran

== Groups ==
=== Dynasties ===
- Alawids, the descendants of Ali ibn Abi Talib, through his wives whom he married after the death of Fatima, the daughter of the Islamic prophet Muhammad
- Alawi dynasty, the current royal family of Morocco since the 17th century
- Alawiyya dynasty, the former royal family of Egypt and Sudan
- Alavids, the Zaydi Alid dynasty of Tabaristan in northern Iran during the 9th and 10th centuries
- Ba 'Alawi sada, a family and social group in Yemen and descendants of Imam Ahmad al-Muhajir through Alawi bin Ubaydillah

=== Religion ===
- Alawites, a minority sect in Syria, also known as Nusayris
- Aleviler in Turkey
- Alevis, a Shia minority sect in Turkey
  - Bektashiyyah, a related school or sect in Turkey and the Balkans
  - Kızılbaşlar, a sub-sect of the Alevis
- Alavi Bohra, an Tayyibi-Isma'ili Shia minority sect in India and Pakistan
- Ba 'Alawiyya, a Sunni Sufi order in Yemen, also known as Tariqa Alawiyya

== Other uses ==
- Alawi (name), a surname and given name
- Alavi (surname), a surname
- Hawaiʻi creeper, also known as ʻalawī

== See also ==
- Alvi (disambiguation)
