= Alvi (disambiguation) =

Alvi (Arabic: علوی) is a name and surname. It may refer to:

== People ==
- Abdul Qadeer Alvi, Pakistani politician
- Abrar Alvi (1927–2009), Indian film writer, director and actor
- Alvi Ahmetaj (born 1998), Albanian football player
- Alvi Fokou Fopa (born 1990), Cameroonian-American football player
- Alvi Haque Haque (born 2002), Bangladeshi cricketer
- Arif Alvi (born 1949), former president of Pakistan
- Farrukh S. Alvi, mechanical engineer
- Hamza Alvi (1921–2003), Marxist academic sociologist and activist
- Junaid Alvi (born 1965), Pakistani cricketer
- Khalid Alvi, Indian professor
- Khalid Alvi (cricketer), Pakistani cricketer
- Moniza Alvi (born 1954), Pakistani-British poet and writer
- Raashid Alvi, Indian politician
- Sajida Alvi (born 1941), Pakistani academic
- Samroj Ajmi Alvi, Bangladeshi actress and model
- Sattar Alvi, Pakistani fighter pilot
- Shahood Alvi, Pakistani actor, director and producer
- Suroosh Alvi (born 1969), Pakistani-Canadian journalist and filmmaker
- Wajihuddin Alvi, Indian scholar
- Zahid Qurban Alvi, Pakistani politician

== Places ==
- Alvi, Crognaleto, frazione in the Province of Teramo in the Abruzzo region of Italy

== See also ==
- Alawi (disambiguation)
- Alavi (surname)
