= Alvi =

Muslim community in South Asia

علوی
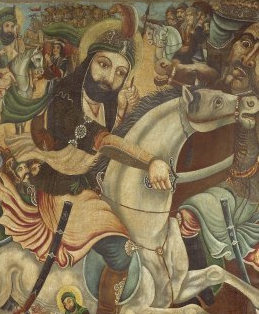
- Portrait of Abbas ibn Ali in the Battle of Karbala

Languages
- Urdu; Hindi; Punjabi; English

Religion
- Islam

Related ethnic groups
- Alids; Sayyids

Alvi (Urdu: علوی, lit. 'of Ali') are an Alid Muslim community in South Asia. They are the descendants of the 4th Rashidun caliph Ali ibn Abi Talib, who was the cousin, companion, and son-in-law of the Islamic prophet Muhammad, through his wives whom he married after the death of Fatima, the prophet's daughter. While, Syeds are the descendants of Ali, through Fatima.

The Alvis include, the descendants of Muhammad ibn al-Hanafiya, Abbas ibn Ali, and Umar al-Atraf. Respectively, they were born to Khawla al-Hanafiyya, Umm al-Banin, and Umm Habib bint Rabi'a (al-Sahba).

== See also ==
- Alvi (disambiguation)

== Bibliography ==
- Lewis, B. (2012). "ʿAlids". In Bearman, P.; Bianquis, Th.; Bosworth, C.E.; van Donzel, E.; Heinrichs, W.P. (eds.). Encyclopaedia of Islam (Second ed.). doi:10.1163/1573-3912_islam_SIM_0543. ISBN 9789004161214.
