= Iranian clergy protests against interest-based banking =

Statements of Shia clergy in Iran

After the Islamic Revolution in Iran, the interest-based banking system was supposed to be replaced with an Islamic banking. Just as Iran's education, health, military and administration have entirely remained westernized, so has its economic system. The rulings of the Shia clergy have been swept under the rug by introduction of the idea of Absolute Guardianship of the Islamic Jurist (In Persian Velâyat-e Faqih) which gives the leader the power to go against the religious rulings if he finds them in conflict with the interest of the holy System. However, since Quran (2:275-280) is very clear on the issue of interest-based banking, all of the major Shia Marja's of Iran have asked the establishment to ban interest based banking.

== The Statements ==
=== Grand Ayatollah Javadi Amoli ===
In April 2018, Ayatollah Javadi Amoli said:

"The Qur'an calls Satan arrogant, but as far as I recall he has not been addressed as warrior against God in the Qur'an. Interest system of our banks is a war against Allah and His Messenger (PBUH). You may name a year as a year of production and prosperity (the Iranian leader named the previous year the Year of Resistant Economy: Production and Employment), as long as there is interest on loan in banking system, nothing will improve."

=== Grand Ayatollah Makarem Shirazi ===
In February 2019, Ayatollah Nasir Makarem Sherazi said:

"Banks have created conditions that have made people's lives miserable. Instead of charging people a fixed fine of 4% on loan, they add 4% more to the fine each year, to the point that, at the end of the fifth year of repayment, the fine reaches the peak of 20%. Usury is being done in the name of interest-free-loan."

=== Grand Ayatollah Noori Hamadani ===
In September 2018, Ayatollah Noori Hamdani said:

"It has been said many times that the money that our banks charge in the name of fines on the loans is interest and is impermissible. But the rulers either do not hear our voice, or they hear but do not bother to act."

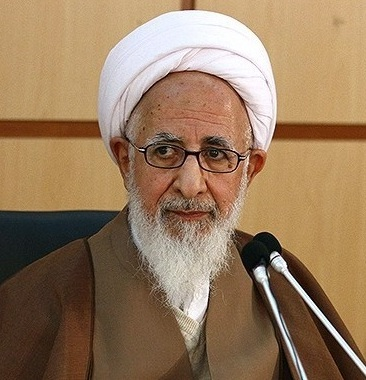
Ayatollah Javadi Amoli

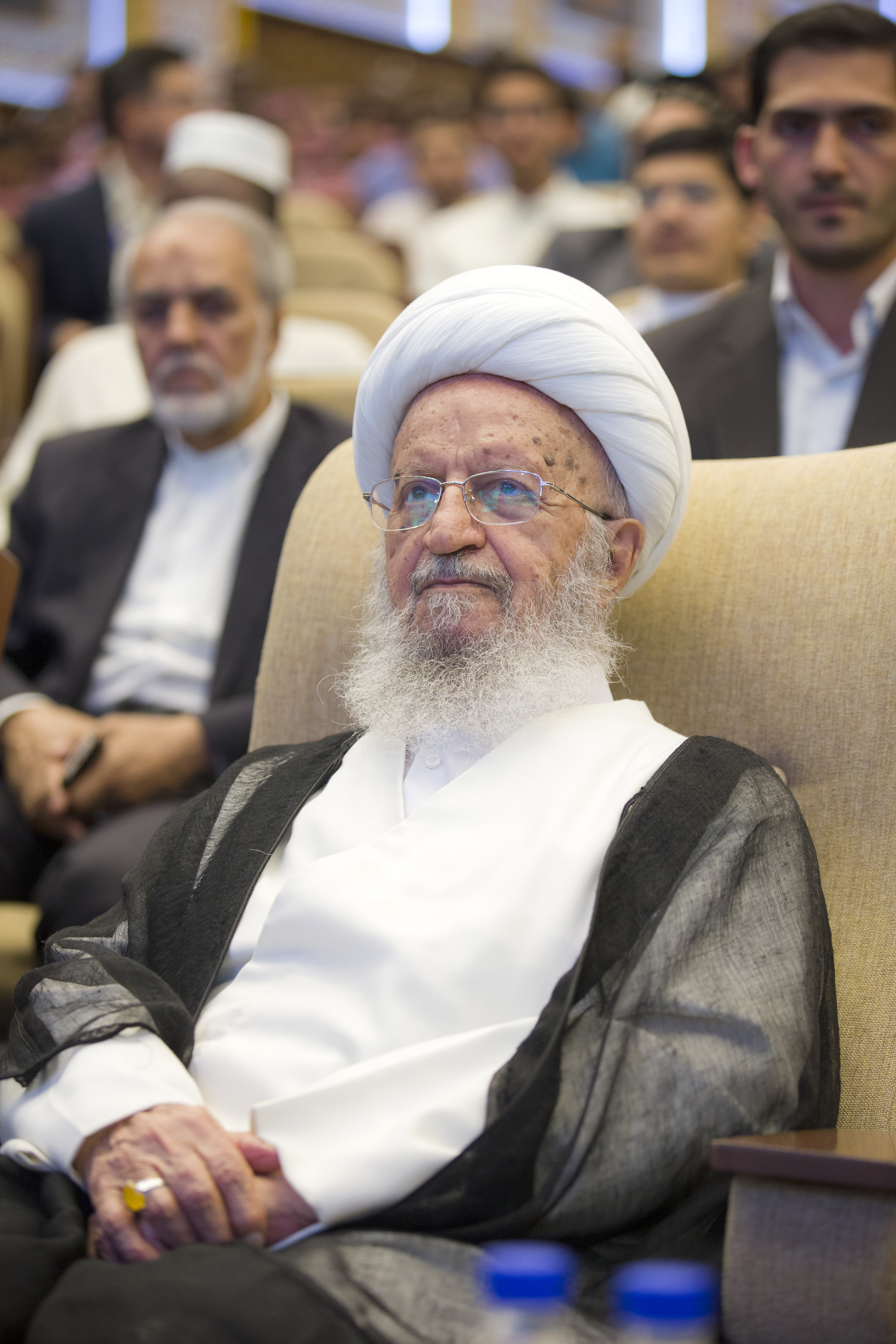
Ayatollah Nasir Makarem Shirazi

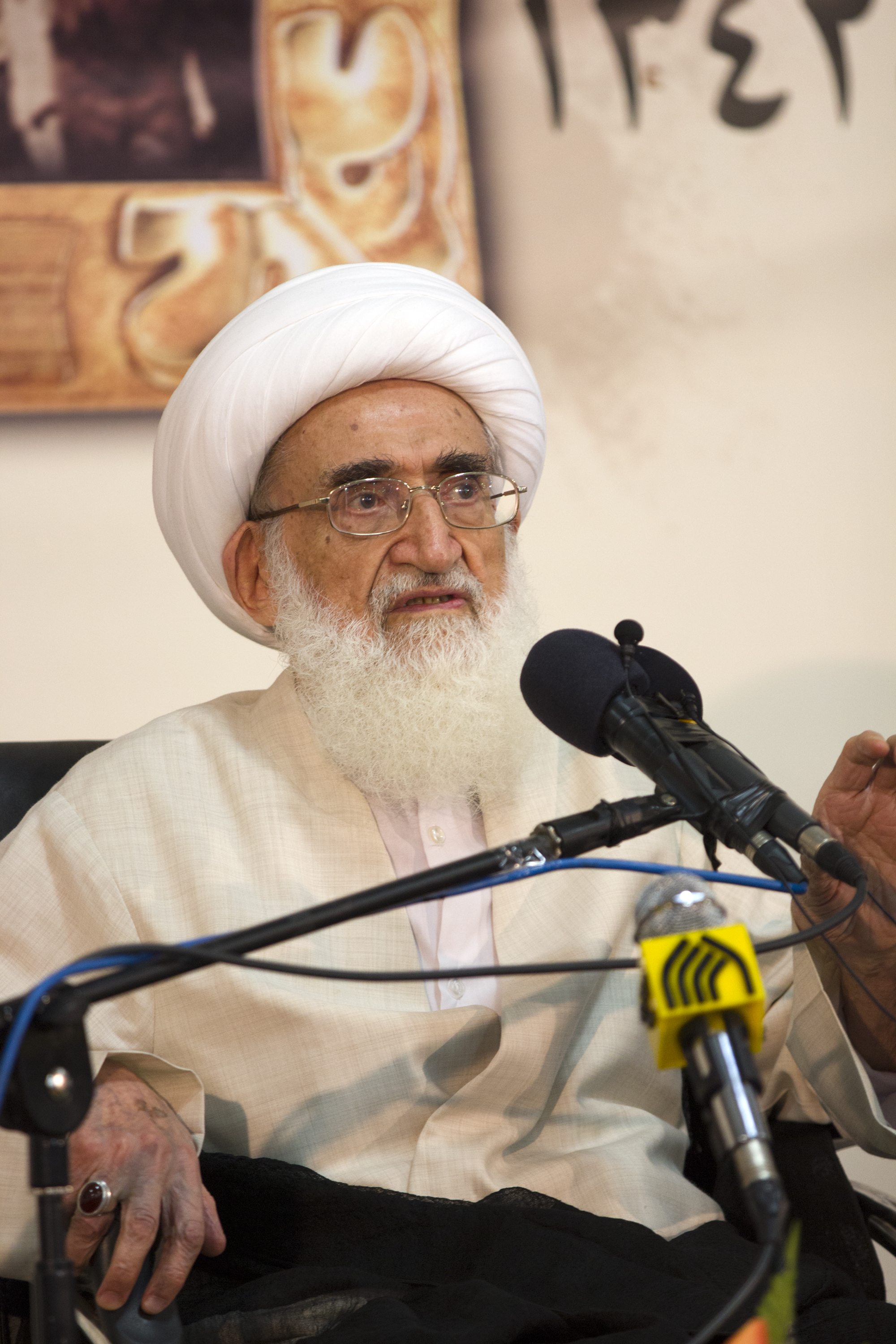
Ayatollah Noori Hamedani

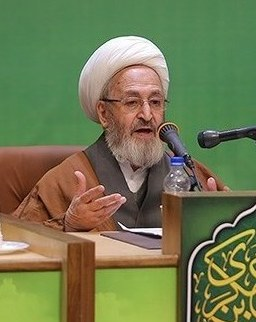
Ayatollah Ja'far Sobhani

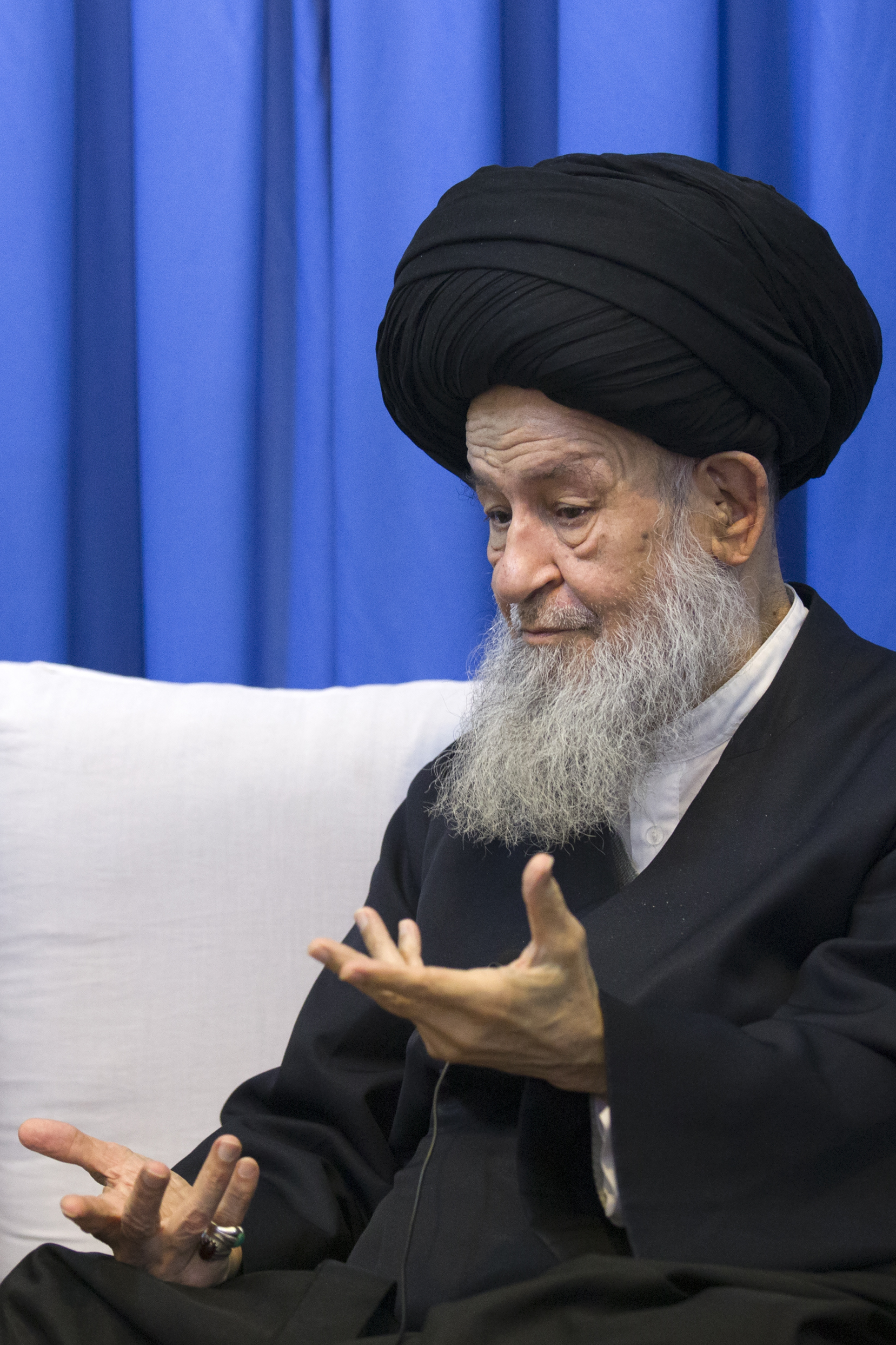
Ayatollah Alavi Gorgani

=== Ayatollah Ja'far Subhani ===
In February 2019, Ayatollah Ja'far Subhani said:

"People take loans from banks and banks charge them interest. Along with this interest, banks also penalize people for delaying repayment. All religious scholars have declared it impermissible. Follow the rulings of the scholars."

=== Ayatollah Alavi Gorgani ===
In February 2019, Ayatollah Muhammad Alavi Gorgani said:

"Economic conditions are worse these days. In such circumstances, people are not able to even perform their religious duties. In this situation (banks) should not be in a rush to collect interest from them. We want banks in the Islamic system to be assistant, helpers and servers of the people. Please lower your interest rate a little to reduce the pressure on people. Or at least take interest according to the conditions, for example, when the economic conditions are better, there is no problem in collecting interest money, but when the wheel of the economy slows down, have mercy on the people and charge them less."

=== Ayatollah Husayn Mazaheri ===
In January 2019, Ayatollah Husayn Mazaheri said:

"Unfortunately, taking and giving interest has become a habit. Some people use such excuses under the pretext of Shari'ah. Its like bathing a rat with clean water and then declaring it halal (permissible to eat). Similarly, taking and giving bribes has become an intrinsic part of our system of governance. Usually nothing works out without a bribe. No knot can be untied without a bribe, no file moves without money."
