= Basic Education College =

The Basic Education College is a degree-awarding tertiary institute in Kuwait. It is one of the four colleges operated by the government's The Public Authority for Applied Education and Training (PAAET) and is part of the nation's applied education sector.

The college is affiliated with the E-TQM College, the world's first online Total Quality Management (TQM) school.

The college provides teachers to the Ministry of Education as part of their drive to improve standards.
