= Abdullapur, Meerut =

Abdullapur
- Nickname: Abdullapur Sadaat
- Interactive map of Abdullapur
- Coordinates: 28°59′24″N 77°45′57″E
- Country: India
- State: Uttar Pradesh
- District: Meerut District
- Established: 16th Century
- Founder: Syed Mir Abdullah Naqvi Al Bukhari

Government
  - Type: Parshad
  - Body: Abdullapur (Meerut)
- Elevation: 192 m (630 ft)

Population (2011)
  - Total: 32,750
- Demonym: metric

Languages
- Time zone: UTC+5:30 (IST)
- PIN: 250001

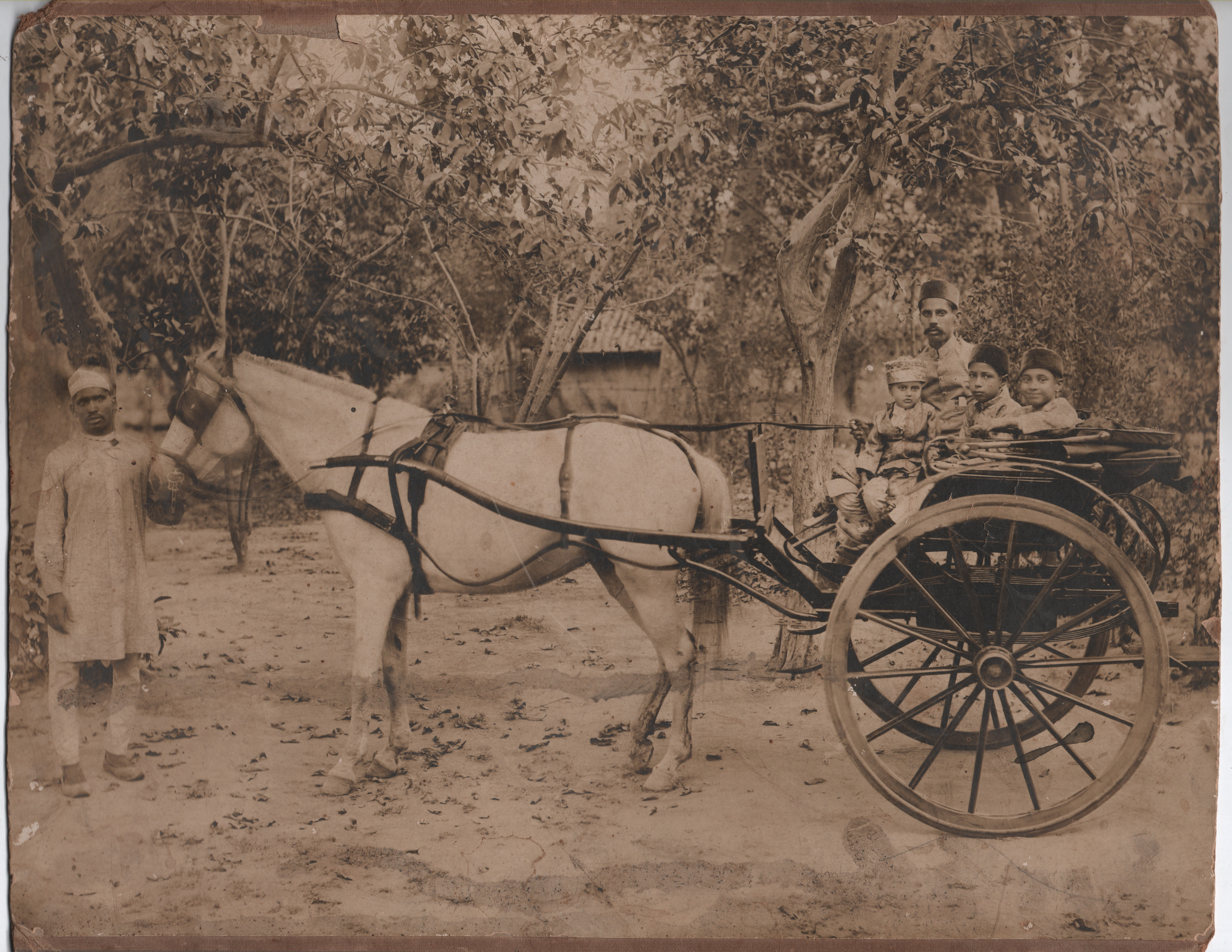
Zamindar Syed Sayyed Hussain Ahmed Naqvi with his sons(Syed Ali Abbas Naqvi and Syed Mirsahib Badshah Ali Naqvi) at Nasarpur, Haveli

Abdullapur is situated in the eastern outskirts of Meerut, just to the south of Ganga Nagar, Meerut district, Uttar Pradesh, India.

It is also known as Abdullapur Sadaat. It was founded by Syed Mir Abdullah Naqvi Al Bukhari. Kot Kila or Kot Fort of Abdullapur was built in the early 16th century, it was his main residence. Abdullapur is the seat of the Jalal Bukhari and Kannauji Bukhari branch of Naqvi.

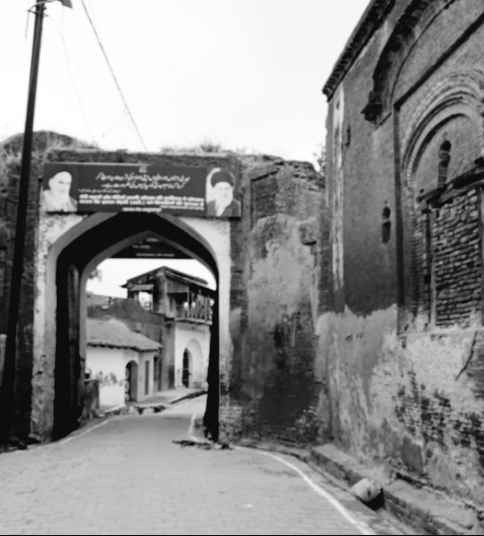
Bada Darwaza, main entrance of Kot Fort, Abdullapur Meerut

Both are descendants of Jalaluddin Surkh-Posh Bukhari through Syed Ali Naqvi, Syed Sadarudin Shah Kabir Naqvi Al Bukhari the chief advisor of Sikandar Lodi and father of Syed Mehboob Alam Naqvi-ul Bukhari Al-Maroof Shah Jewna.

9th Moharram of this village is quite famous. Notable sites include Bada Darwaza (main entrance of Kot Fort), Syed Asgar Hussain's Imambara, Shakir Mahal, 52 Dari, Kot Masjid, Azmat Manzil, Sayyed Tomb, Syed Barkat Ali Naqvi's 300 years old Pakki Baithak, Prachin Shiv Mandir.

Sayyeds of this place are popularly known as "Mirsahibs". They had a large Jagirdara consisting of 52 villages. The lavish lifestyle of Syed Bunyad Ali Naqvi and Syed Badshah Ali Naqvi was noteworthy. There are numerous wafq frauds cases going on including Vijay Mallya's liquor factory on waqf land.

The Meerut district jail is located at Abdullapur. This jail has an illustrious history attached to it as its establishment dates back to as early as 1857, It is also called Shri Chaudhry Charan Singh Jail, named after the 5th Prime Minister of India.

The Pakistani writer, linguist and critic Syed Qudrat Naqvi was a denizen of Abdullapur, his famous books are Ghalib kaun hai, Asaas-i-Urdu, Ghalib-i-sad rang, Seerat-un-Nabi, Hindi-Urdu lughat, Mutal'a-i-Abdul Haq, Lisani maqalaat. He migrated to Pakistan after the partition of India.

== Gallery ==
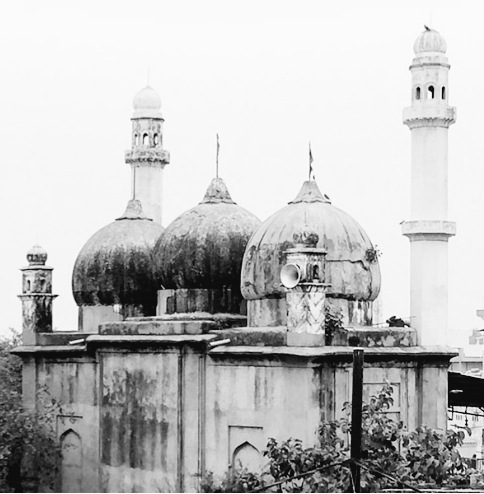
400 years old Kot Masjid, Abdullapur Meerut
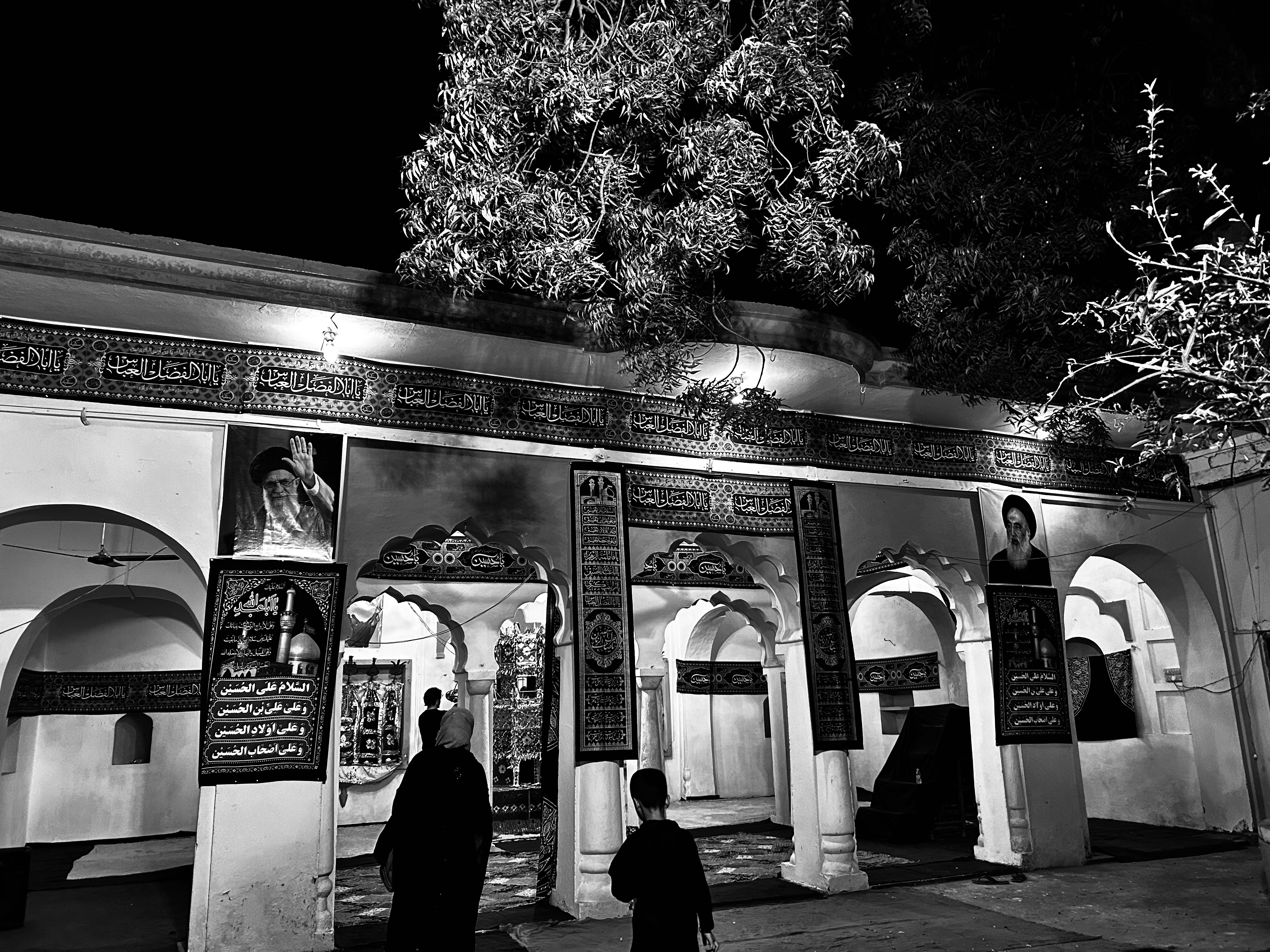
Zamindar Sayyed Asgar Hussain’s Imambara, Abdullapur

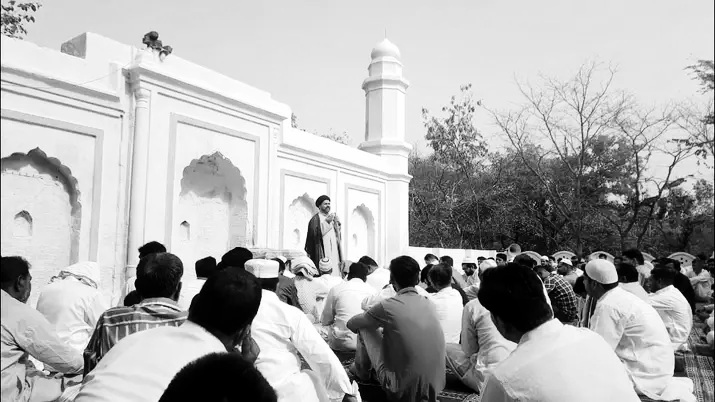
Eidgah Abdullapur

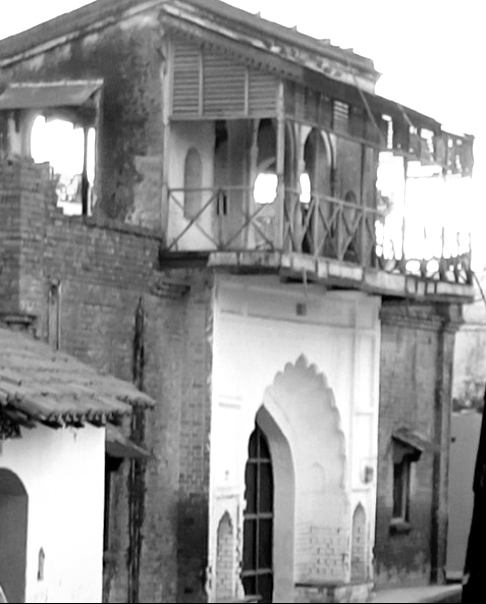
Azmat Manzil was built by Zamindar Syed Azmat Ali Naqvi, Abdullapur Meerut

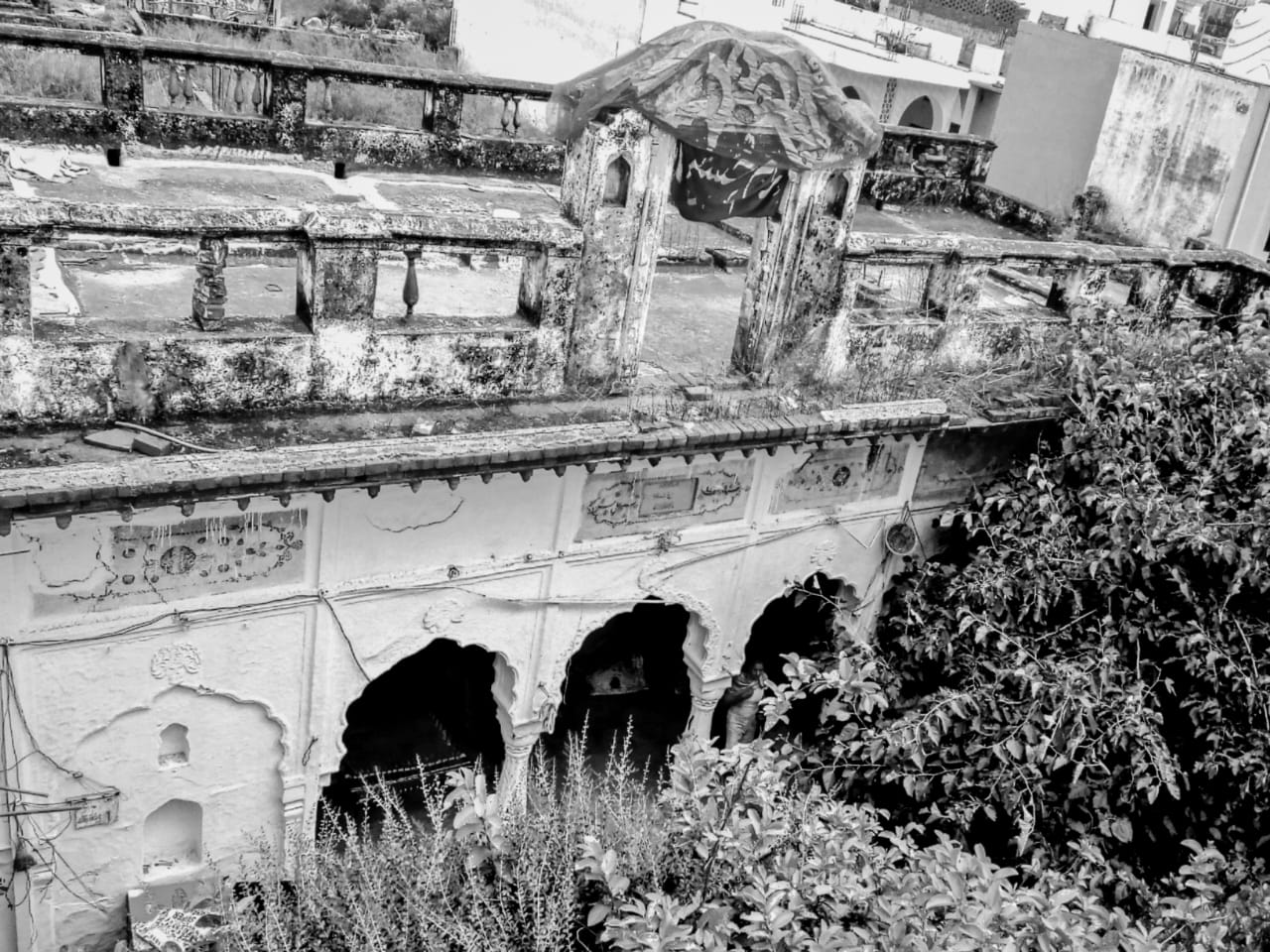
Shakir Mahal of Zamindar Syed Shakir Ali Naqvi, Abdullapur Meerut

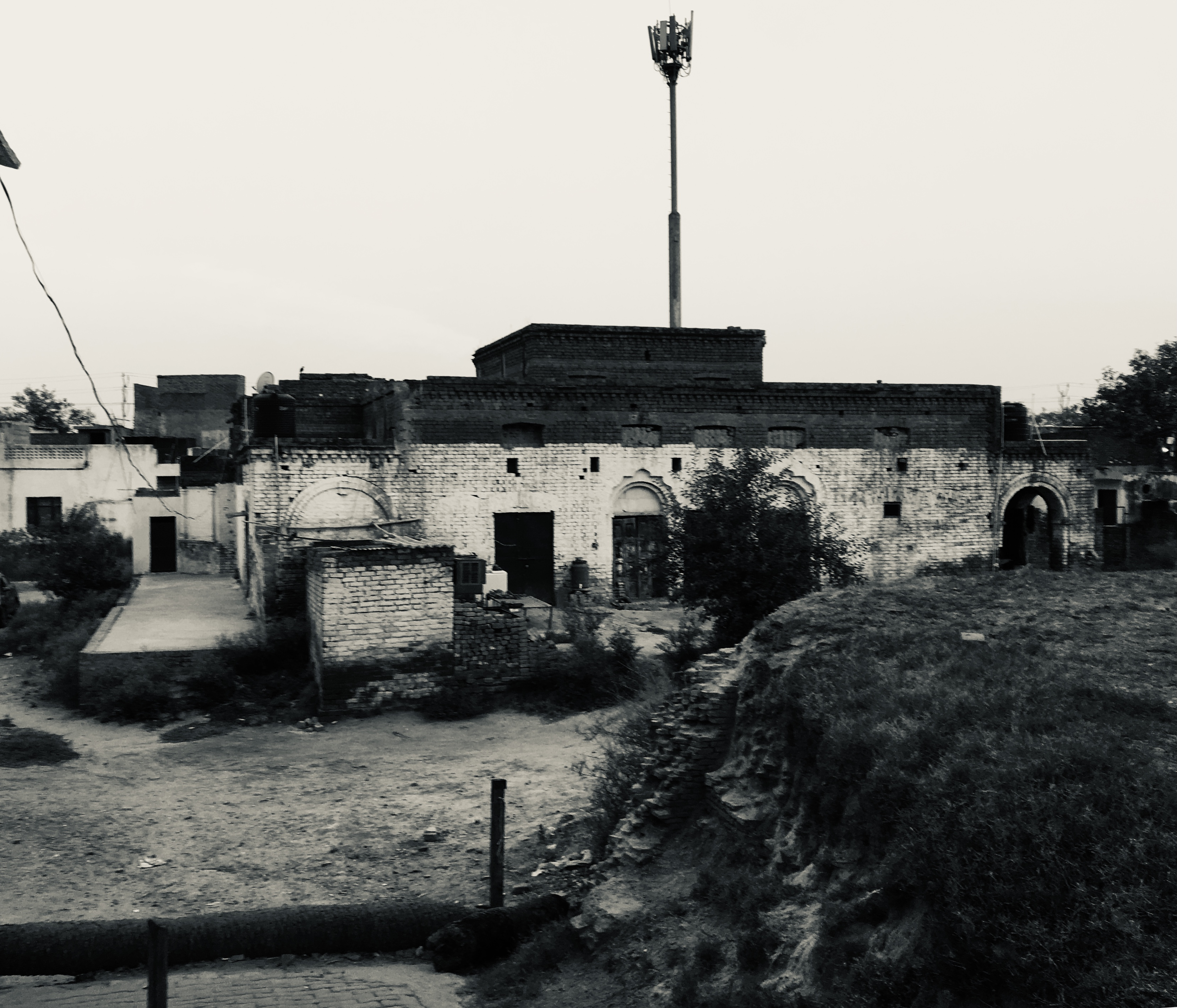
52 dari was built by Zamindar Syed Shamsher Ali Naqvi, Abdullapur Meerut

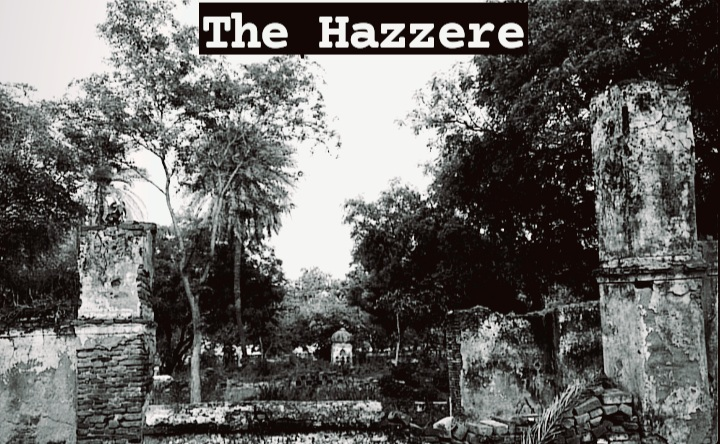
The ruined Mosque inside Syed Shakir Ali Naqvi's Graveyard Hazzere, Abdullapur Meerut

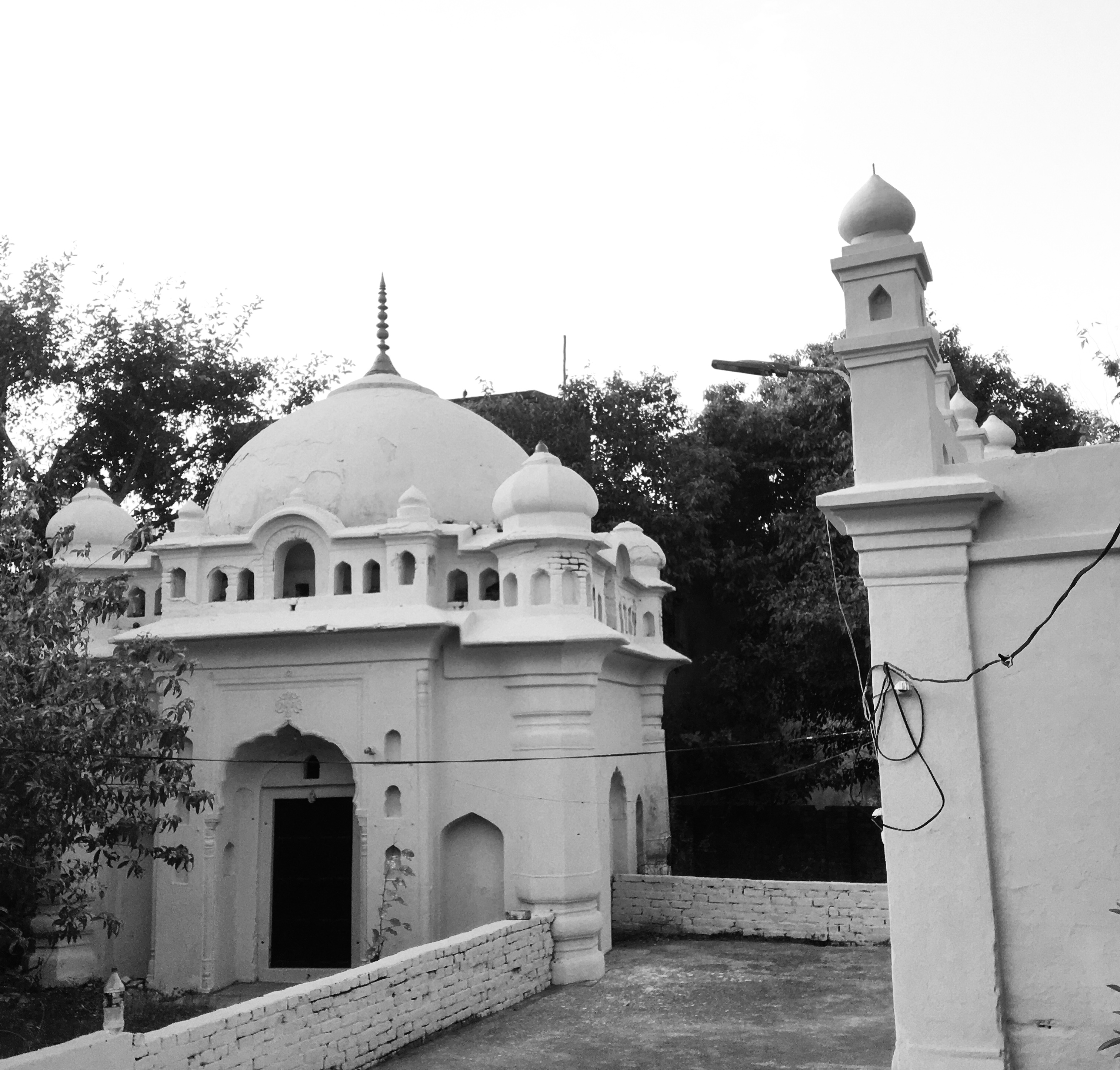
The Tomb and Mosque of Zamindar Syed Sayyed Mohammad Naqvi, Abdullapur Meerut

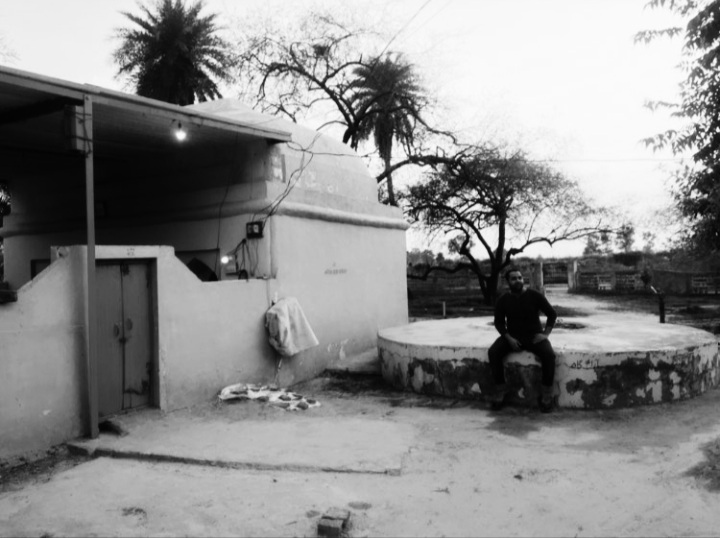
Pir Syed Sher Ali Naqvi's Mosque, Tomb and Well, Abdullapur Meerut

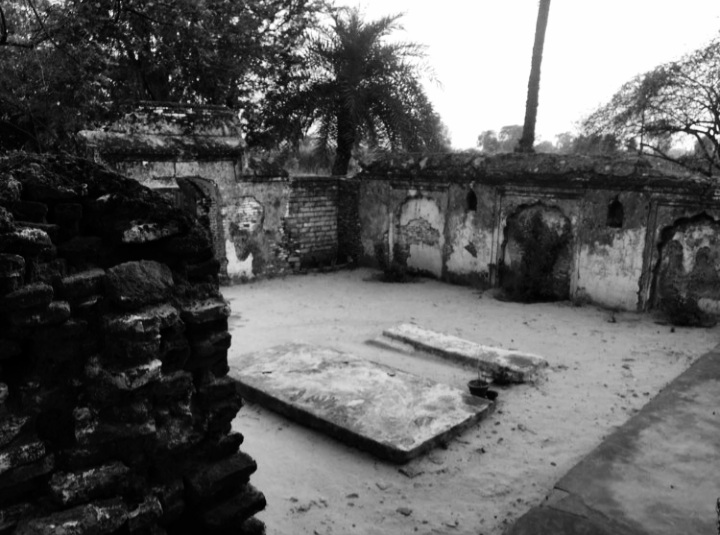

== Further sources ==
- Delimitation of Parliamentary and Assembly Constituencies Order, 1976, p. 561. Election Commission, India, 1976
- Directory of Cities and Towns in India (ed. Om Parkash Sharma, Dy. Dir. of Census Operations). Kar Kripa Publishers, 1989
- Uttar Pradesh District Gazetteers: Meerut (text & suppl.), p. 469. Government of Uttar Pradesh, 1965
