= E-TQM College =

Online school in Dubai, United Arab Emirates

Hamdan Bin Mohammad e-University formerly e-TQM College. in Dubai is the world's first online school for the field of Total Quality Management (TQM), and the first "virtual" university in the Middle East. The college was founded in 2002 by the Dubai Police, and by 2004 had 50,000 students.

The university comprises three schools:

The School of Business and Quality Management
The School of Environmental Studies
The School of e-Education

They are affiliated with the Dubai Autism Center and the Basic Education College in Kuwait, University of Bradford in UK, University of Wisconsin as well as with the University of California Berkeley.
