= Diaa al-Awady =

Egyptian physician and social media personality

- Born: 1979
- Died: 2026 (aged 46–47); Dubai
- Education: Ain Shams University Faculty of Medicine
- Medical career
- Profession: Physician
- Field: Anesthesia
- Notable works: Tayyibat diet

Diaa al-Awady (Arabic: ضياء العوضي; died 19 April 2026) was an Egyptian physician, anesthetist and medical influencer known for promoting the "Tayyibat" (الطيبات) a pseudoscientific dietary system. He attracted millions of followers across social media by offering dietary advice. His recommendations were widely criticized by medical authorities for lacking scientific evidence, leading to the revocation of his medical license and expulsion from the Egyptian Medical Syndicate.

== Early life and career ==
Diaa al-Awady was born in 1979 in Egypt to an academically oriented family. His origins trace back to Sharqia Governorate in Egypt. He showed academic excellence from an early age, graduating from the Faculty of Medicine at Ain Shams University with honors (Excellent with Distinction) and ranking among the top of his class. He later earned both a master's degree and a Ph.D. in Anesthesiology and Intensive Care from the same university. After graduating, al-Awady specialized in anesthesiology, intensive care, and pain management. He worked as a consultant at Ain Shams University Hospitals as well as several private hospitals. He progressed through the academic ranks until becoming an Assistant Professor in the Department of Intensive Care at Ain Shams University, a position he held until 2023. During the same period, media reports stated that Ain Shams University had terminated his appointment as a faculty member. Between 2017 and 2018, He shifted from working in an ICU to working in preventive healthcare, immunology, and as a dietitian. According to El Watan News, that is when he began sharing controversial medical advice online.

Al-Awady trained as an anesthetist and intensive care physician before becoming a full-time medical influencer. Through YouTube, Facebook and other social media platforms, he promoted what he called the "Tayyibat" diet, which divided foods into "wholesome" (طيبات) and "harmful" (خبيثات) categories. He argued that many chronic diseases could be treated through dietary changes and frequently criticized modern medicine and the pharmaceutical industry.

Besides being a physician, Al-Awadi became a faculty member in Ain Shams university.

By May 2026, his YouTube channel had over 340,000 subscribers and his Facebook page had approximately two million followers, with additional Facebook groups attracting hundreds of thousands of members.

=== Tayyibat dietary system ===
The dietary system known as the Tayyibat (Arabic: نظام الطيبات, lit. 'wholesome foods') diet, classified foods into tayyibat (Arabic: طيبات, lit. 'wholesome') and khabithat (Arabic: خبيثات, lit. 'harmful') categories, drawing on terminology found in the Quran. He argued that modern chronic diseases resulted primarily from consuming foods in the latter category and that many conditions could be prevented or reversed by returning to foods he considered tayyibat.

The diet encouraged the consumption of meats like beef or lamb, rice, dates, refined sugar, cheeses, and some fruits like bananas and grapes, while discouraging or prohibiting foods including white flour, many seafoods or fish, some legumes like lentils, poultry, eggs, leaf vegetables, dairy products.

The system was promoted as a comprehensive lifestyle rather than solely a weight-loss diet. He also maintained that many prescription medications could be reduced or discontinued once dietary changes had restored health, a claim that was rejected by medical authorities.

=== Controversy ===
Al-Awady's dietary advice drew widespread criticism from physicians, nutritionists and Egyptian health authorities. His recommendations excluded numerous foods generally regarded as part of a healthy diet while encouraging followers to reduce or discontinue prescribed medications in favor of dietary treatment.

According to the Egyptian news paper Youm7, a source from Ain Shams University announced in April 2026 that al-Awadi had been expelled from the university 2 years ago and that he is no longer among the teaching staff.

Despite these actions, his dietary movement continued to attract followers online and inspired restaurants, online communities and social media groups dedicated to the Tayyibat system. Some followers of the diet reported improved wellbeing after adopting the diet, although some nutritionists have attributed this to the placebo effect. On several occasions, he claimed that smoking was harmless. In July 2026, the Guardian reported that a lupus patient passed away months after stopping taking medications in compliance with al-Awadi's advice.

==== Criticism on social media ====
In December 2025, a pediatrician at Mansoura Health Insurance Hospital alleged that the family of a seven-year-old child with type 1 diabetes had stopped administering insulin after following al-Awady's advice, resulting in the child developing diabetic ketoacidosis. The allegation received widespread attention as al-Awady was already under investigation by the Egyptian Medical Syndicate over his medical content.

==== Feud with the family of Abdel Halim Hafez ====
On March 28, 2026, the family of Egyptian singer Abdel Halim Hafez announced legal action against al-Awady over a video in which he discussed the singer's medical treatment and claimed there may have been errors in his care. The family described the video as offensive and stated that it sought to generate controversy at the expense of Hafez's legacy, saying it would pursue the matter through legal channels.

==== Clinic closure & lisence loss ====
In 2026, the Egyptian Medical Syndicate removed him from its register after determining that he had promoted medical information lacking scientific evidence. The Ministry of Health subsequently closed his clinic and revoked his license to practice medicine. Following his death, Egypt's Supreme Council for Media Regulation prohibited the publication and circulation of his recorded medical content, citing risks to public health.

His clinic, located in Nasr City, Cairo, was shut down on March 10, 2026.

==== Governmental warnings ====
The Saudi Ministry of Health issued a warning against the Tayyibat diet in 2026 after it reported cases of hospitalisations linked to the diet. Similar warnings were also issued by the Egyptian ministry of health. The Egyptian ministry of health also issued warnings regarding a number of restaurants reportedly promoting the diet.

The Tunisian ministry of health warned against abstaining from or altering the dosage of prescription drugs in compliance with the Tayyibat diet without consulting a medical professional.

Warnings were also issued by both the Palestinian and Israeli ministries of health.

== Death ==
Al-Awady died on 19 April 2026 in Dubai at the age of 47 after reportedly suffering a heart attack. His death prompted widespread discussion among supporters and critics. The UAE Foreign Ministry denied any suspicions of criminal wrongdoing regarding his death, the ministry said that al-Awadi died of natural causes. His body was transported to the Egyptian consulate in the UAE, then transported to Cairo, Egypt for burial. Some political commentators warned against the spread of conspiracy theories about al-Awadi's death on social media.

A video clip circulating on social media showed al-Awadi saying "if I die, I was murdered", which aroused suspicions among those close to him, prompting the family to request a second autopsy in May 2026. Following requests from his family, Egyptian authorities exhumed his body and ordered a second autopsy while investigations into the circumstances of his death continued.

== Legacy ==
In September 2026, a show based on Al-Awady's life was announced, and was met with controversy over the subject matter. It is planned to be directed by Baher Dowidar, and to star Fathy Abdel-Wahab.

== See also ==
- List of forms of alternative medicine
- Fad diet
