= Fawaz Al-Awadhi =

- Born: Fawaz Mohammed Al-Awadhi; October 11, 1985 (age 40); Kuwait
- Education: Washington University in St. Louis; University of California, Berkeley; University of London; Kuwait University
- Occupation: Businessperson

Fawaz Mohammed Al-Awadhi (Arabic: فواز محمد العوضي) (born October 11, 1985) Businessman and Kuwaiti law, Secretary General of the Kuwaiti Association for the Defense of Public Funds, Chief Legal Officer and Chief Audit and Compliance Officer at Alghanim Industries Company and board member of Gulf Bank, and Professor of Law at The Public Authority for Applied Education and Training.

== Early life and education ==
Dr. Fawaz Al-Awadhi first joined Alghanim Industries in 2008 as a legal advisor, and during his career at the company,He has assumed increasingly senior positions and currently serves as Acting Chief Legal Officer and Chief Audit and Compliance Officer, playing a pivotal role in building a high-performing legal team that has garnered numerous awards and accolades.His legal expertise and strategic leadership have contributed to supporting the growth of the company's business and strengthening its partnerships with leading global companies, in addition to his work at Alghanim Industries. In August 2023, he was appointed Director of Legal Affairs and Professor of Law at the College of Business Studies at The Public Authority for Applied Education and Training.

== Career ==
Dr. Fawaz Al-Awadhi holds a J.S.D. in Civil Law from Washington University School of Law, a LL.M. from UC Berkeley School of Law, an MBA from London Business School and a LL.B. degree in Civil Law from Kuwait University.

== Awards ==
- The Arab Best in Law Award was presented at the 7th Global Awards ceremony in Paris.
- The Arab Professional Excellence Award in Law was also presented at the 7th Global Awards ceremony.
