= Semnani =

Semnani (Persian: سمنانی) may refer to:

- Semnani language, one of the local languages of the Semnan Province of Iran
- Semnani languages, a group of Northwestern Iranian languages, spoken in Semnan province of Iran
- Semnani people, an Iranian people who primarily live in northern Iran and speak the Semnani language
- Ashraf Jahangir Semnani (1287–1386), a Sufi saint

In biology

- Elachista semnani, a moth in the family Elachistidae
- Scrobipalpa semnani, a moth in the family Gelechiidae

== See also ==
- Semnan (disambiguation)
