= Minhajul Abedin Afridi =

Bangladeshi cricketer

Personal information
- Full name: Minhajul Abedin Afridi
- Born: 5 February 1999 (age 27); Chittagong, Bangladesh
- Batting: Right-handed
- Bowling: Legbreak googly
Medal record
Men's Cricket
Representing Bangladesh
South Asian Games
Gold medal – first place	2019 Kathmandu/Pokhara	Team
- Source: Cricinfo, 2 February 2019

Minhajul Abedin Afridi (born 5 February 1999) is a Bangladeshi cricketer. He made his Twenty20 debut for the Rangpur Riders in the 2018–19 Bangladesh Premier League on 2 February 2019. He made his List A debut for Sheikh Jamal Dhanmondi Club in the 2018–19 Dhaka Premier Division Cricket League on 8 March 2019. He made his first-class debut on 10 October 2019, for Chittagong Division in the 2019–20 National Cricket League.

In November 2019, he was named to Bangladesh's squad for the 2019 ACC Emerging Teams Asia Cup in Bangladesh. Later the same month, he was selected to play for the Rajshahi Royals in the 2019–20 Bangladesh Premier League, and he was named to Bangladesh's squad for the men's cricket tournament at the 2019 South Asian Games. The Bangladesh team won the gold medal, after they beat Sri Lanka by seven wickets in the final.

Afridi learnt cricket due to his father's love for the game; his father was a passionate fan of the Pakistani cricket team and named him "Afridi".
