= Shams Ur Rehman Alavi =

Indian journalist

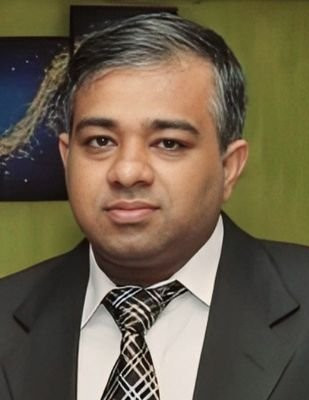
- Born: 22 October 1975 (age 50)
- Occupations: Journalist, Blogger
- Years active: 1998-Present

Shams Ur Rehman Alavi is an Indian journalist from Madhya Pradesh, India. He works with Hindustan Times and also writes for various publications like Firstpost, The Wire, and Huffington Post. Alavi has specially written about the challenges facing the Muslim community, including social exclusion and political marginalization. His reporting has also highlighted the contributions of Muslims to Indian society, which has helped counter negative stereotypes and prejudices. His writings have drawn attention towards the need for greater representation of marginalized groups in politics and media.

== Early life and education ==
Alavi was born in Bhopal, Madhya Pradesh. He did his early studies from Bhopal. Later he completed Bachelor of Engineering from Samrat Ashoka Technological Institute, Vidisha.
