= The Public Authority for Applied Education and Training =

- Motto: To Build Kuwait in National Hands
- Type: Public Authority
- Established: 1982
- President: Dr Hassan Alfajjam
- Location: Adailiyah, Kuwait
- Website: http://www.paaet.edu.kw

The Public Authority for Applied Education and Training (PAAET) (Arabic: الهيئة العامة للتعليم التطبيقي والتدريب) is an academic institute in Kuwait. It is considered one of the largest institutes offering associate degrees in the Middle East in terms of the number of enrolled students. The PAAET offers a wide variety of vocational programs across its different colleges and training institutes.

== Historical Overview ==
It was established on December 28, 1982, by law number (63) with the objective of developing and upgrading manpower to meet the shortfall in technical manpower created by industrial and economic development of the country.

The foundation of applied education and training was laid along with the initiation of oil exploration, production and export in Kuwait. In the 1950s, the State began to establish training centres and organised programmes to prepare the manpower needed for the oil industry. After building the fundamental structure of the educational system, the Ministry of Education established a number of specialised institutions to meet the increasing demand for skilled manpower. The other ministries established their own training centres and institutes as well. The State found it essential to establish a central body to supervise and coordinate the activities of these numerous institutes.

The Technical and Vocational Education Department was established in 1972 to supervise technical and vocational education. The Central Training Department was established to supervise training centres and institutes set up by to State Ministries.

The Technical and Vocational Education Department continued to function until 1982 when the Public Authority for Applied Education and Training (PAAET) was established as an autonomous body to supervise technical and vocational training and envision and implement an overall plan for the sector.

== Objectives ==
The goal of PAAET is to develop the national technical manpower and to meet human resource needs of the country through its two sectors: Education and Training.

== Colleges & Institutes ==
- The applied education sector includes four colleges, which offer the following specialisations:
1. College of Basic Education
2. College of Business Studies
3. College of Technological Studies
4. College of Health Sciences.
- Besides the four colleges, there are number of training institutes such as:
1. The Higher Institute of Energy ( Formerly Electricity and Water Institute )
2. The Higher Institute of Telecommunication and Navigation ( Formerly Telecommunication and Navigation Institute )
3. Industrial Training Institute (Sabah Al-Salem & Shuwaikh)
4. Nursing Institute
5. Constructional Training Institute
6. Vocational Training Institute

== Special Training Courses ==
The Authority’s Training Coordination Department offers programs predicated on the requested needs of the various Kuwaiti ministries, state institutions and the private sector. These differ from the regular programs offered by the colleges and institutes of the Authority in that they are implemented in response to special requests only, and in almost all cases the students are already in the employed or guaranteed employment after graduation, by the government or private sector.

- Departmental Objectives :

The objectives of this department are to prepare a well skilled cadre to meet the various and particular needs for manpower as requested by the public and/or the private sector.

- Specializations :

The very nature of this department is such that the programs offered will depend almost entirely upon the requested needs of the government and private sectors. Listed below are some of the most often requested programs:-

1. Under Technical (Engineering and Technology)
2. Under Para-Medical
3. Under Administrative Secretary ship and Office Work
4. Services
5. Agriculture
- Study System :

The programs offered by this department are of varying duration, a matter of weeks or months, while others are of the usual two year institutional span. If they are of two year duration or longer the successful graduate will be granted the normal PAAET diploma, if less than the minimum required for a diploma, they will be granted a certificate of attendance and/or a certificate of participation.

- Opportunities :

As the Kuwaiti citizens in these programs are already guaranteed employed by the Kuwaiti government or the private sector, the question of employment does not arise. However successful completion of one of these programs almost inevitably leads to promotion.

== See also ==
- List of universities in Kuwait
