= Farrukh S. Alvi =

Dr. Farrukh S. Alvi
- Education: Florida State University
- Occupations: Professor of mechanical engineering, Florida State University

Farrukh S. Alvi is a Professor of Mechanical Engineering at Florida State University who works in the development and implementation of actuators, especially micro-fluidic actuators for flow and noise control applications in the aerospace industry. According to the American Society of Mechanical Engineers, "Alvi’s Boeing-FSU team developed the actuators implemented in a fullscale supersonic store release sled test for the Holloman Air Force Base DARPA program—the first sled test of its kind and the first supersonic store release."

== Career ==
Alvi's research provides insights regarding methods of addressing shock boundary layer interactions, the aeroacoustics of high speed jets, including supersonic impinging jets, and the associated problems of compressible mixing and jet noise. Alvi also directs the Florida Center for Advanced Aeropropulsion, a statewide partnership between universities and industry in Tallahassee, Florida that has been selected by the FAA as a national Center of Excellence, where he is building a new generation wind tunnel funded by the National Science Foundation and also heads the Advanced Aero-Propulsion Laboratory. Dr. Alvi is an elected fellow of the American Society of Mechanical Engineers, serves on the editorial board of the American Institute of Aeronautics and Astronautics Journal, and holds a Ph.D. in mechanical engineering from Pennsylvania State University.
