= Alawi (name) =

Alawi (Arabic: علوي) means "follower of Ali" or "descendant of Ali", and is a common surname (and sometimes as a given name) in the Muslim world. In Arab countries occupied by the British Empire, the name is transliterated as "Alawi". In Arab countries that were occupied by the French Third Republic, the name is transliterated as "Alaoui". In South Asia it is usually transliterated as "Alavi" or "Alvi" (see Alavi).

== Alawi ==
- Ahmad al-Alawi
- Alawi bin Husain
- Abdallah bin Alawi
- Faisal Alawi
- Majeed Al Alawi
- Alawi Shukri
- Abdulaziz Fayez Al Alawi
- Badar Juma Subait Al Alawi
- Moath Hamza Ahmed al Alwi
- Muhammad Alawi al-Maliki
- Ivana Alawi
- Alawi Mohammed Alsakkaf

== Allawi ==
Allawi (Arabic: علاوي) is a family name mostly prevalent in Iraq. Notable people with the surname include:

- Ayad Allawi (born 1945), former Prime Minister of the Iraqi Interim Government
- Mohammed Tawfiq Allawi (born 1954), former Iraqi Minister of Communications and Member of the Council of Representatives
- Ali Allawi (born 1947), former Iraqi Defence and Finance minister

In addition, Alawi and Ali names take Allawi as a nickname.

== Alaoui ==
- Mariem Alaoui Selsouli
- Zakaria Alaoui
- Suleiman al-Alaoui

== See also ==
- Alavi (surname)
