= Alvi Haque =

Bangladeshi cricketer (born 2002)

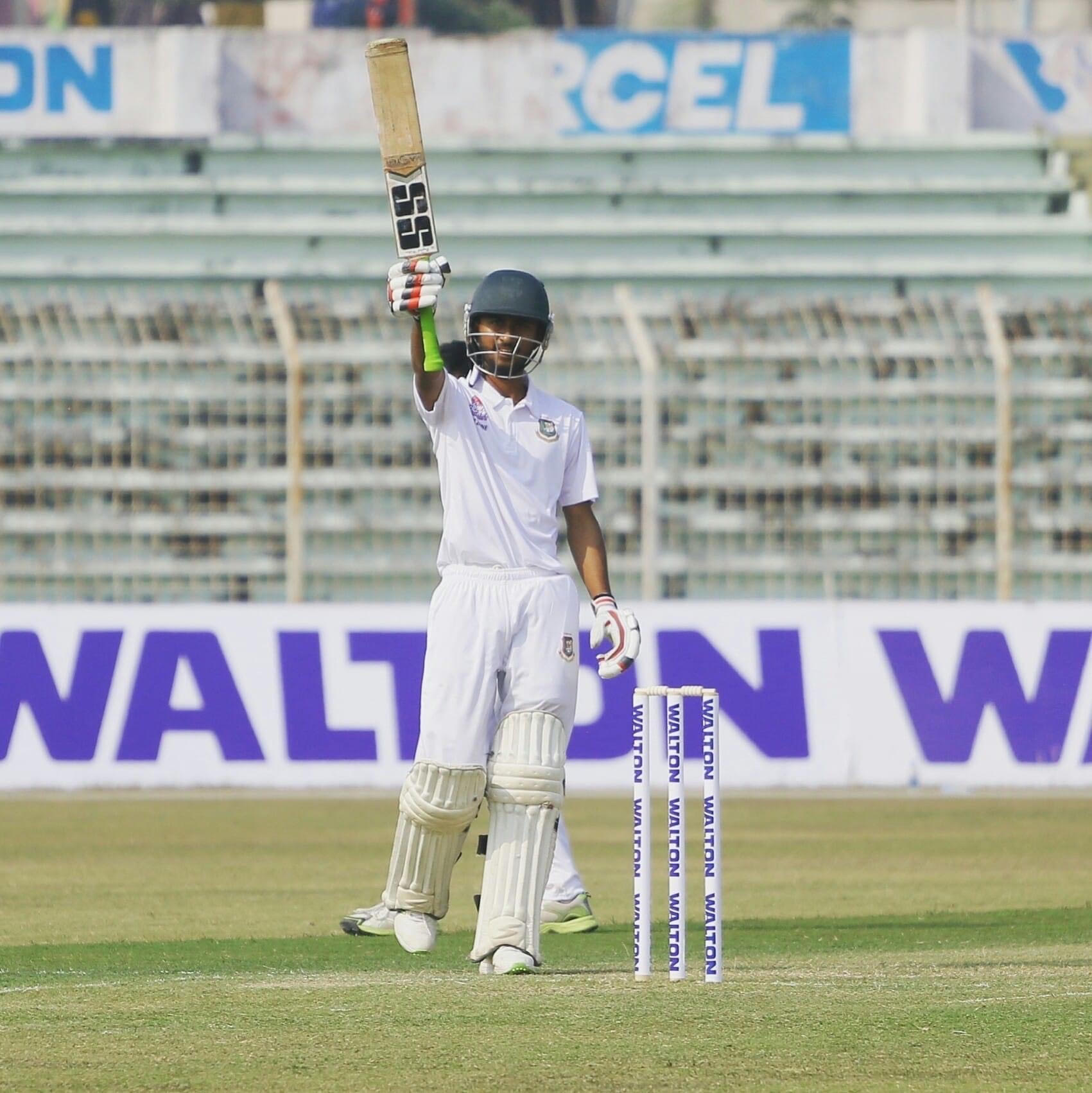

Personal information
- Born: 10 June 2002 (age 24)
- Source: Cricinfo, 12 November 2019

Alvi Haque (born 10 June 2002) is a Bangladeshi cricketer. He made his first-class debut on 9 November 2019, for Chittagong Division in the 2019–20 National Cricket League.
