= Mohammad Alavi Gorgani =

Iranian Twelver Shi'a marja (1940–2022)

Sayyid Grand Ayatollah Mohammad Alavi Gorgani
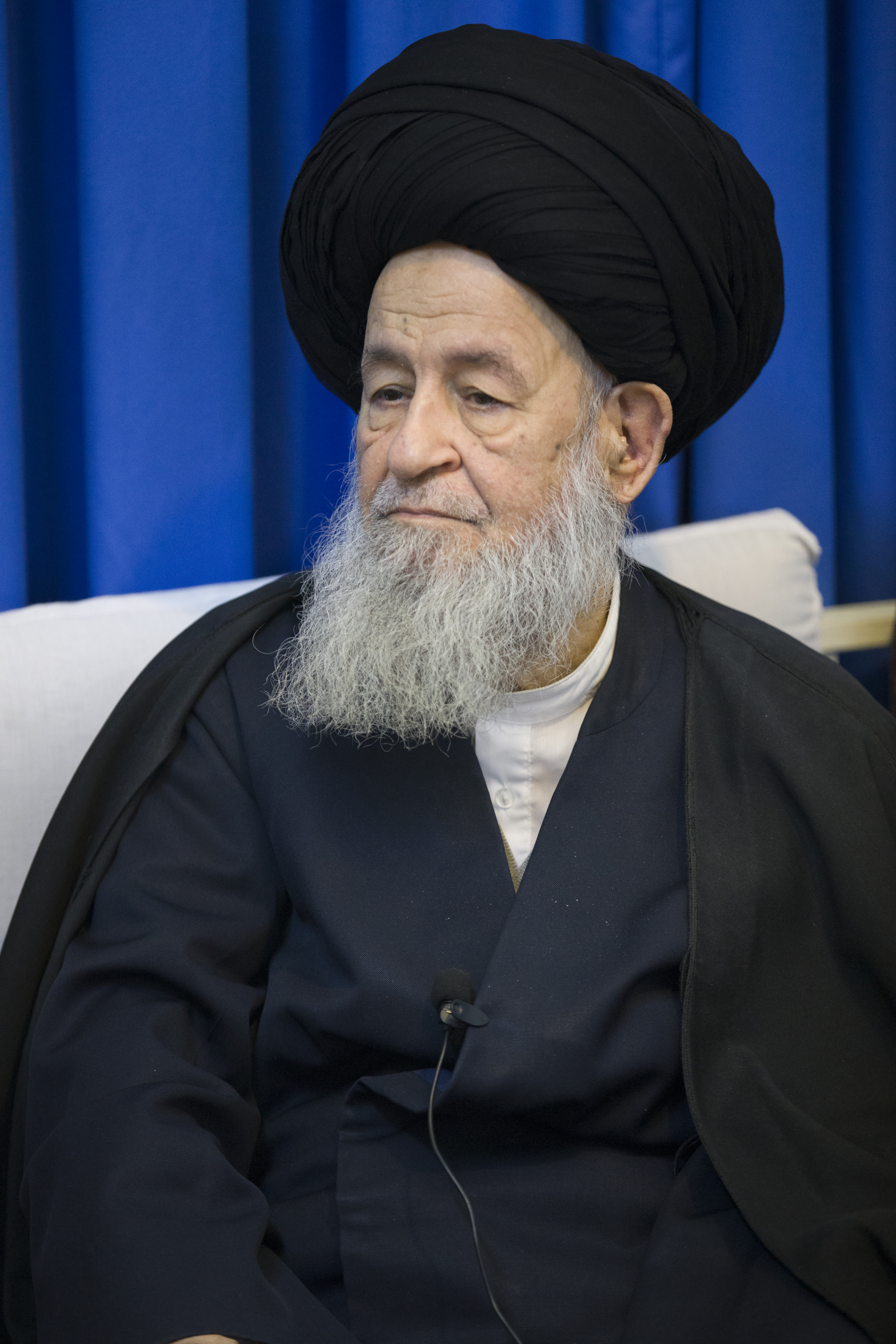
- Gorgani in 2016
- Born: March 1940; Najaf, Iraq
- Died: 15 March 2022 (aged 81–82); Qom, Iran
- Website: www.gorgani.ir

Grand Ayatollah Sayyid Mohammad Ali Hosseini Alavi Gorgani (Persian: سيد محمد على حسينى علوى گرگانى; March 1940 – 15 March 2022) was an Iranian Twelver Shi'a marja'.

== Early life and education ==
He was born in a religious family in Najaf, Iraq. He rose to a leading scholar in Najaf, and moved to Qom after the fall of Pahlavi Iran in 1979. Ayatollah Alavi Gorgani studied under the late Ayatollah Bourujerdi, Ayatollah Khomeni, Ayatollah Mohammad Ali Araki, and Ayatollah Golpaygani.

== Political and social activities ==
Before the revolution, Ayatollah Alavi Gorgani supported the Islamic Republic and took part in rallies against the Pahlavi regime. He also supported the Islamic Republic after the revolution.

At the same time, he was appointed to the Qom High Court by Ayatollah Khomeini. During the Iran-Iraq War, he went to the war front with his students. After the death of Imam Khomeini, he continued to support the Islamic Republic and its leader. He was also active in the construction of charitable and public buildings, including: repair part of the Jameh Mosque in Gorgan and build and repair several mosques in Gorgan. He also built the A'zam Mosque and Ayatollah Haj Seyyed Sajjad Alavi Clinic in Alang village, the Seyyed al-Shuhada Hussainiya in Mehdi Shahr, Semnan, and a qard al-hasanah fund and the "Vahdat-e Fatemiyeh" religious group on South 17 Shahrivar Street in Tehran.

Gorgani had voiced support for Palestine, stating that:

Muslim countries must stand united and help other nations, but unfortunately, we see that some countries are under the impression of colonial powers and they do not support the oppressed nations.

== Religious views ==
Furthermore, he had ruled that Baháʼís are infidels and that "associating with them is reprehensible and disgusting." Gorgani had also stated that publishing photographs of unveiled women is equivalent to prostitution.

Reportedly, he had claimed that apartment buildings were a British plot designed to spread moral corruption by encouraging women to leave the home, in addition to obscuring the view of shrines in the cities of Mashhad and Qom.

== Death ==
Alavi Gorgani died on 15 March 2022, in Qom. He was buried in the Masjed-e Bala Sar (مسجد بالاسر), which is part of the greater Fatima Masumeh Shrine.

== Works ==
Ayatollah Gorgani had authored several books and treatises on various topics in Islamic science, including: Al-Manāẓir al-Nāẓirah fī Aḥkām al-ʿItrat al-Ṭāhirah, Laʾālī li-l-Uṣūl, Nūr al-Hudā fī al-Taʿlīq ʿalā al-ʿUrwat al-Wuthqā, Al-Taʿlīqah ʿalā Taḥrīr al-Wasīlah, Ajwibat al-Masāʾil – Answers to religious questions, from purification to diyah, Anwār Akhlāqī or Rāh-e Tūshah-ye Pārsāyān, Tawḍīḥ al-Masāʾil, Manāsik al-Ḥajj, Isteftāʾāt va Manāsik va Adʿiyah-ye Ḥajj, Aḥkām-e Javānān, Aḥkām-e Bānuvān, Golčīnī az Dars-hā-ye Akhlāq (A Selection of Ethics Lessons) and a collection of messages and statements issued on various occasions, such as the days of Fatimiyya, the days of iʿtikāf, Ramadan, and Muharram.

== See also ==
- Reza Ostadi
- List of maraji
- Hashemi Rafsanjani
