= Semnan =

Semnan may refer to:

- Semnan province, a province in Iran
- Semnan County, a county in the Semnan Province of Iran
- Semnan, Iran, a city in the Semnan County of Iran

== See also ==
- Semnani (disambiguation)
