= Egyptian Medical Syndicate =

Medical Association

The Egyptian Medical Syndicate is a medical association with more than 230,000 registered members. About 65% of the members work outside Egypt. It was founded in 1940 and is a semi-governmental organization existing primarily to help the Ministry of Health in conferring licenses to physicians. The 24-seat council is elected at the national level. The Doctors Without Rights Movement, founded in 2007, gained a majority on the council. Many of its members had an important role in the establishment of the field hospital in Tahrir Square during the early days of the 2011 protests in Egypt and it was the main opponent of the Muslim Brotherhood within the syndicate.

Ehab el-Taher is the secretary-general.
