= Yasser Al-Awadi =

Yemeni politician (1978–2021)

Member of the House of Representatives of Yemen
- In office 27 April 2003 – 15 November 2021

Personal details
- Born: 1 March 1978 Radman Al Awad District, Yemen Arab Republic
- Died: 15 November 2021 (aged 43) Cairo, Egypt
- Party: GPC

Yasser Ahmed Salem Al-Awadi (Arabic: ياسر أحمد سالم أحمد عبد الله العواضي; 1 March 1978 – 15 November 2021) was a Yemeni politician. A member of the General People's Congress, he served in the House of Representatives from 2003 until his death in 2021.
