= Emami (disambiguation) =

Emami Islamic Iranian Surname referring to twelver 'Imamah Shia Doctrine

== Persons ==
- Mohammad Hosayni Emami (fl. 1860s–1870s), Iranian lacquer painter
- Hassan Emami (1903–1981), Iranian Shia cleric and royalist politician
- Jafar Sharif-Emami (1912–1998), Iranian politician
- Karim Emami (1930–2005), Iranian translator
- Mohammed Emami-Kashani (born 1931), Iranian ayatollah
- Mohammad Reza Emami (17th century), Persian calligrapher
- Saeed Emami (1958–1999), Iranian deputy minister of intelligence under Ali Fallahian
- Younes Emami (born 1997), Iranian wrestler

Non-Iranians:

- Ayiri Emami (born 1975), Nigerian businessman, billionaire

== Others ==
- Emami Limited, an Indian company
