= Amal Al-Awadhi =

Kuwaiti actor

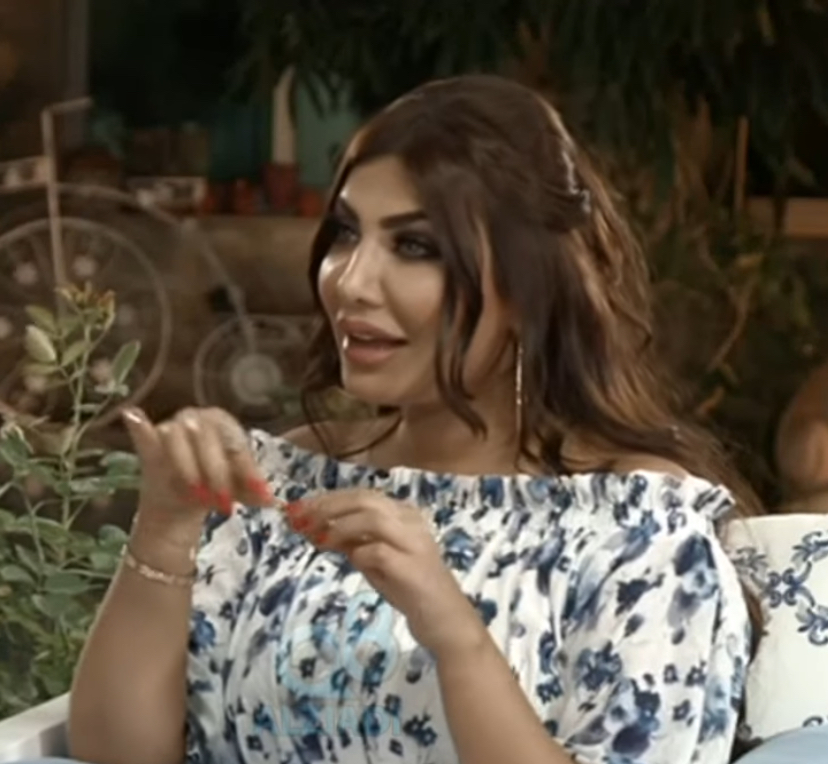
- Born: March 30, 1989 (age 37); Kuwait, Kuwait
- Occupations: Actress, TV Presenter
- Years active: 2004–present
- Children: 2

Amal Al-Awadhi is a Kuwaiti actress and TV presenter.

== Early life ==
َAmal Al-Awadhi was born on 30 March 1989. She started her career at the age of seventeen, when she presented a program for kids named Tilfizyun al atfal (lit. '"TV for kids"'). She graduated from the University of Kuwait with a Bachelor in Political Science and Business Administration in 2010.

== Personal life ==
In 2008, she married the Kuwaiti businessman Abdullah Al-Awadhi, stopped acting, and concentrated on her family. When she gave birth to her only daughter Munira, she returned to acting.

Amal is often criticized in Kuwait for her lifestyle as too western, getting comments from her followers on social media criticizing her for personal matters such as plastic surgeries or short dresses.

== Work ==
=== TV Programs ===
- "A'inak al watan" (2005)
- "Suhubat mahrajan hala febraier" (2007)
- "Qadha walla" (2007)
- "Jad wa la'ab" (2007)
- "Jad wa la'ab 2" (2008)
- "Ammoula" (2012)
- "Black and white" (2013)
- "Houwa w hi w heya" (2014)
- "Lamset fawz" (2018)

=== TV Series ===
Year	Series name	Character played
2006	"Sahibat al emtiyaz"	Sahar
2007	"Hams al harayer"	Huda
2008	"Al fateen"	Ruha
2008	"Shar al nufus"	Abir
2011	"Banat sukkar nabat"	Farah
2012	"Ayyam al u'mur"	Hayat
2013	"Abu al malayeen"	Ghada
2013	"Mutalaqat saghirat"	Sarah
2013	"Ay dame'et huzn la"	Layal
2014	"Thuraya"	Madhawi
2014	"Ya min kunt habibi"	Rayan
2016	"Nawaya"	Basma
2016	"Hekayat ahlam wardiyya"	Fajr
2016	"Khams banat"	Nadia
2017	"Dhikrayat la tamut"	Reem
2018,	"Ham nawaya"	Basma

=== Plays ===
- "Al qarasina" (2013)

=== Music Videos ===
She acted in two music videos with Iraqi singer and musician Majid Al Mohandis:

- "Ana hannet" (2013)
- "Yalli bahebak mut" (2020)
