= Mohammad Alavi (nuclear engineer) =

Iranian nuclear engineer

Mohammad Alavi is an Iranian nuclear engineer and a former employee at Palo Verde, the largest nuclear power plant of the United States. He was held in jail for 54 days by US court.

He was arrested April 8, 2007 as he stepped off a plane in Los Angeles. He had returned to the United States with his wife for the birth of their first child.

Iran's foreign minister sent a letter to U.S. officials demanding Alavi's immediate release.

He was released in June 2007 after it was cleared that he had not taken any designs or blueprints of the Palo Verde power plant.

As conditions of release, Alavi was forced to surrender his passport, wear a GPS monitoring device, and forfeit a $200,000 retirement account if he failed to appear in court. Alavi's friends in Huntington Beach, California, also agreed to put up their home as surety of his appearance in court.

== See also ==
- Haleh Esfandiari
