= Shah Jeewna =

- Town
- Location within Pakistan
- Coordinates: 31°25′01″N 72°15′45″E
- Country: Pakistan
- Province: Punjab
- District: Jhang
- Time zone: UTC+5 (PST)

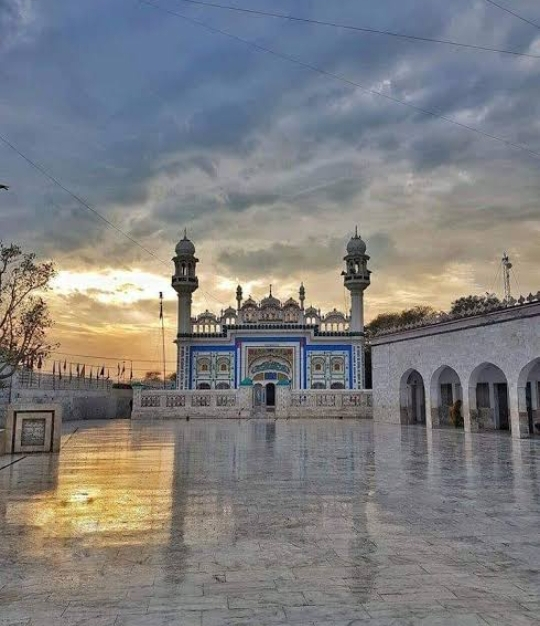
Shah Jewna Shrine, Jhang District

Shah Jeewna (or Jewna, Jiwana, Jewana) is a town of Jhang District in the Punjab, Pakistan. It is located on the Jhang-Lalian road at 31°31'13N 72°20'21E some 34 km from Jhang.

Shah Jeewna was named after Syed Mehboob Alam Naqvi-ul Bukhari Al-Maroof Shah Jewna, a famous Muslim spiritual leader, missionary and descendant of Jalaluddin Surkh-Posh Bukhari. His father Syed Sadaruddin Shah Kabeer Naqvi was advisor of King Sikandar Lodi. Shah Jewna migrated from Kannauj to Shah Jeewna (a town named after him), which was deserted until he settled there. Jewna's descendants are still present in various places of India and Pakistan.
