= Alavi (surname) =

Notable people with the surname Alavi include:

- Ali Alavi, Theoretical chemist
- Patrick Alavi, a German Musician
- Abass Alavi, is Professor of Radiology and Neurology
- Abrar Alvi, was an Indian film writer, director and actor
- Ameer Faisal Alvi Awan, was the first General Officer Commanding of the elite Special Service Group of Pakistan Army
- Arif Alvi, is president of Pakistan
- Bozorg Alavi, was an influential Iranian writer, novelist, and political intellectual
- Hakim ‘Alavi, was a royal Persian physician of the 18th century
- Hasan Jamil Alvi, is a former Pakistani cricketer
- Moniza Alvi, is a Pakistani-British poet and writer
- Rashid Alvi, a politician from Indian National Congress party is presently a Member of the Parliament of India
- Samroj Ajmi Alvi, is a Bangladeshi actress and model.
- Sajida Alvi, is a female academic of Pakistani origin in Canada
- Sattar Alvi, is a Pakistan Air Force's veteran fighter pilot and retired Air Commodore of Pakistan Air Force .
- Shamsur Rehman Alvi, is a journalist with Hindustan Times
- Suroosh Alvi, is a Pakistani Canadian journalist and film-maker
- Shahood Alvi, is a television actor, Pakistan
- Mahmoud Alavi, is the Minister of Intelligence of Iran
- Mohammad Alavi (nuclear engineer), is an Iranian nuclear engineer
- Mohammad Alavi Gorgani, is a scholar in Najaf, Iraq
- Mohammad Alvi, is an Iranian footballer
- Yousef Alavi, is a mathematician who specializes in combinatorics and graph theory
