= List of Syrian poets =

This is a list of poets either born in Syria or holding Syrian citizenship.

== A ==
- Omar Abu Risha
- Adunis
- Mamdouh Adwan
- Darin Ahmad
- Ninos Aho
- Khalaf Ali Alkhalaf
- Sulaiman al-Issa
- Osama Alomar
- Nasib Arida
- Assad Ali
- Krayem Awad
- Maram al-Masri

== B ==
- Muhammad Salim Barakat
- Salim Barakat

== C ==
- Cyrillona

== H ==
- Ahmad Ali Hasan
- Qustaki al-Himsi
- Khalil al-Hindawi
- Amira Abul Husn

== J ==
- Nouzad Ja'adan
- Badawi al-Jabal
- Nouri al-Jarrah

== K ==
- Mohja Kahf
- Yusuf al-Khal
- Khaled Khalifa
- Hasan al-Khayer
- Colette Khoury

== M ==
- Muhammad al-Maghut
- Nabil Maleh
- Abd al-Mu'in Mallouhi
- Khalil Mardam Bey
- Francis Marrash
- Maryana Marrash
- Adwar Mousa

== N ==
- Hamida Nana
- Ahlam al-Nasr
- Nazih Abu Afach
- Salwa Al Neimi

== Q ==
- Nizar Qabbani

== S ==
- Hassan Ibrahim Samoun
- Abd al-Rahman al-Shaghouri
- Maqbula al-Shalak

== W ==
- Raed Wahesh
- Genan Wakil

== Y ==
- Muhammad al-Yaqoubi
