= Pakistani involvement in the Arab–Israeli conflict =

Involvement of Pakistan during the Arab-Israeli Wars

Throughout the Arab–Israeli conflict, Pakistan has been a key supporter of both the Arab nations and the Palestinian cause. Pakistan has often provided military support through volunteers, weapons, and special training. Pakistani pilots such as Saiful Azam and Sattar Alvi have fought in both the Six-Day War and Yom Kippur War.

== Background ==
Ever since the independence of both Israel and Pakistan, relations were tense. Muhammad Ali Jinnah, the founder of Pakistan, was very vocal in his support of the Arabs and a Palestinian state. In 1945, Jinnah stated,

"Every man and woman of the Muslim world will die before Jewry seizes Jerusalem. I hope the Jews will not succeed in their nefarious designs and I wish Britain and America should keep their hand off and then I will see how the Jews conquer Jerusalem. The Jews, over half a million, have already been accommodated in Jerusalem against the wishes of the people. May I know which other country has accommodated them? If domination and exploitation are carried now, there will be no peace and end of wars”

Just a few days after the Partition of India, Jinnah sent a delegation to Cairo under Abdur Rehman Siddiqui to participate in the Inter-Parliamentary World Congress on Palestine. Alongside this, Muhammad Zafarullah Khan, Pakistan's first foreign minister, called the Balfour Declaration illegitimate, and rejected the United Nations Partition Plan for Palestine.

=== Attempt to establish ties ===
In May 1948 upon the independence of the State of Israel, David Ben-Gurion contacted Jinnah in an attempt to establish diplomatic ties between Israel and Pakistan; however, he received no response.

=== Beginning of Pakistani support to the Arab states ===
In 1952, Muhammad Zafarullah Khan began to promote state policies against Israel and an approach of friendliness and aid to the Arab states. Khan advocated for Pakistan's continued support to the Palestinians, and this laid the groundwork for Pakistan's foreign policy to the Arab world.

== Military support ==
=== 1948 Arab-Israeli War ===
Although the Pakistani government did not directly intervene in the 1948 Arab-Israeli War or send any volunteers, it was rumored that Pakistan was planning to send military units to Palestine. The Israeli embassy in Washington D.C. received information that Pakistan had purchased 250,000 rifles from Czechoslovakia that were to be sent to the Arabs, and that Pakistan had purchased three military aircraft in Italy for Egypt.

=== Six-Day War ===
In 1967, Pakistan sent volunteer pilots to the Arab states amidst the Six-Day War, with the most notable of these being Flight Lieutenant Saiful Azam, a Pakistani (later Bangladeshi) pilot who was sent to Jordan in November 1966 as an advisor to the Royal Jordanian Air Force. Azam holds the highest shooting record of Israeli Air Force aircraft until today. Nur Khan, commander-in-chief of the Pakistan Air Force from 1965 to 1969 also participated in the Six-Day War, witnessing dogfights and being remembered by Israeli pilots for his adept aerial skills.

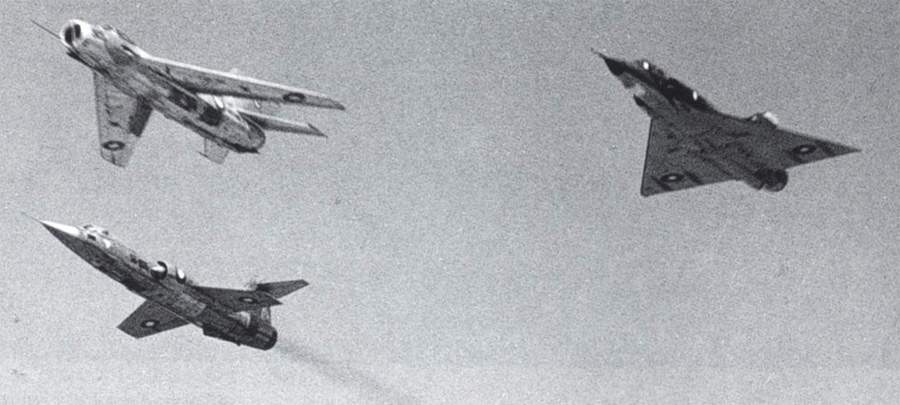
3-ship formation of the PAF consisting of a Shenyang F-6, Lockheed F-104 & Dassault Mirage-III.

Ezer Weizman, Commander of the Israeli Air Force and former President of Israel once remarked about Nur Khan in his autobiography that, "He was a formidable fellow and I was glad that he was Pakistani and not an Egyptian".

==== Saiful Azam's engagements ====
At the outbreak of the Six-Day War, Azam was stationed in Jordan as an advisor to the Royal Jordanian Air Force. Azam scored a victory against one Dassault Mystère IV while flying a Hawker Hunter, as part of the No. 1 Squadron of the RJAF, which was defending the Mafraq airbase. Azam shot another Dassault Mystère IV however it aborted, trailing with smoke. A day later, Azam was shifted to H-3 Iraqi Air Force base in western Iraq that was struck by the Israelis, and where he shot down an Israeli Vautour IIA and Dassault Mirage III. Azam is credited for saving both Iraqi and Jordanian air bases from destruction and suffering the same fate as the Egyptian Air Force. In 2000, Azam would be recognized by the United States Government as one of the top 20 greatest flying aces.

=== Yom Kippur War ===
During the Yom Kippur War, Zulfikar Ali Bhutto, the Prime Minister of Pakistan sought to maintain close and friendly relations with the Arab world, and so sent Pakistani volunteers to Egypt and Syria. Bhutto remarked to Syrian President Hafez al-Assad that a Pakistani air brigade would be ready to defend Damascus in the event of an Israeli invasion. Furthermore, Flight Lieutenant Arif Manzoor was squadron leader of the Pakistani pilots that were volunteers for the Syrian Air Force. Manzoor adopted the call-sign "Shahbaz" for the Pakistani pilots' formation.

==== Sattar Alvi's engagements ====
Sattar Alvi was a Pakistani flight lieutenant who volunteered for the Syrian Air Force alongside Manzoor in 1973. On April 26, 1974, Alvi was flying a SAF MiG-21F-13 (Serial No. 1863) on deputation to the No. 67A Squadron of the SAF out of Dumayr Air Base, Syria, in an eight-ship formation with a fellow PAF pilot and the flight leader, Squadron Leader Arif Manzoor. Manzoor was apprised of the presence of two Israeli Phantom aircraft while patrolling the Israeli border at the Golan Heights, and believed these to be decoys while two others from the opposite direction could be the real threat. These Phantom aircraft were allegedly operating out of Ramat David Airbase and were on a reconnaissance mission. Alvi was last in his formation and so was the most open target. Heavy radio jamming by Israeli ground stations made communication difficult, which meant that Alvi was unable to communicate with his squadron. Captain Lutz, the apparent Israeli wingman that was engaging Alvi was downed by Alvi, and as another Phantom approached Alvi, it disengaged and flew back across the Israeli border. Captain Lutz was supposedly killed in the dogfight, although he is not listed as a casualty of war by the Israeli Ministry of Defense.

In an interview with The Centrum Media in 2022, Alvi recalled,

"It was 26th April 1974, and the time was about 3:30 in the afternoon. Hooter blew, siren blew. It was a hot scramble. We all ran to the aeroplanes. We didn't know that there was going to be a situation. While we were on our way back to the base, our radar controller said that 4 aircraft are approaching from there, 4 from there, 4 from there and 4 from there. The total number of aircraft in the air around us was 56. We were 8 and they were 56. We wanted to return to the base because we were running out of fuel. But if they approached fast, they could shoot you. You had to take evasive action to fight them."

In August 2023, the Syrian embassy in Islamabad awarded Alvi with the Medal of Bravery alongside a Certificate of Commemoration.

=== 1982 Lebanon War ===
During the 1982 Lebanon War, 50 Pakistani volunteers for the PLO were captured by the Israel Defense Forces and taken as prisoners.

== Gallantry ==
=== Gallantry awards received by Sattar Alvi ===
Foreign Awards
Syria	Order of Bravery (Wisam al Shujaa)
Syria	Order of Merit (Wisam al Istehqaq)

=== Gallantry awards received by Saiful Azam ===
Foreign Awards
Jordan	Order of Independence (Wisam al-Istiqal)
Iraq	Iraq Campaign Medal (Nawt as-Shaja'ah)

== See also ==
- Israel-Pakistan relations
- Foreign relations of Pakistan
- List of wars involving Pakistan
