= Khayr al-Din al-Asadi =

Syrian historian (1900-1971)

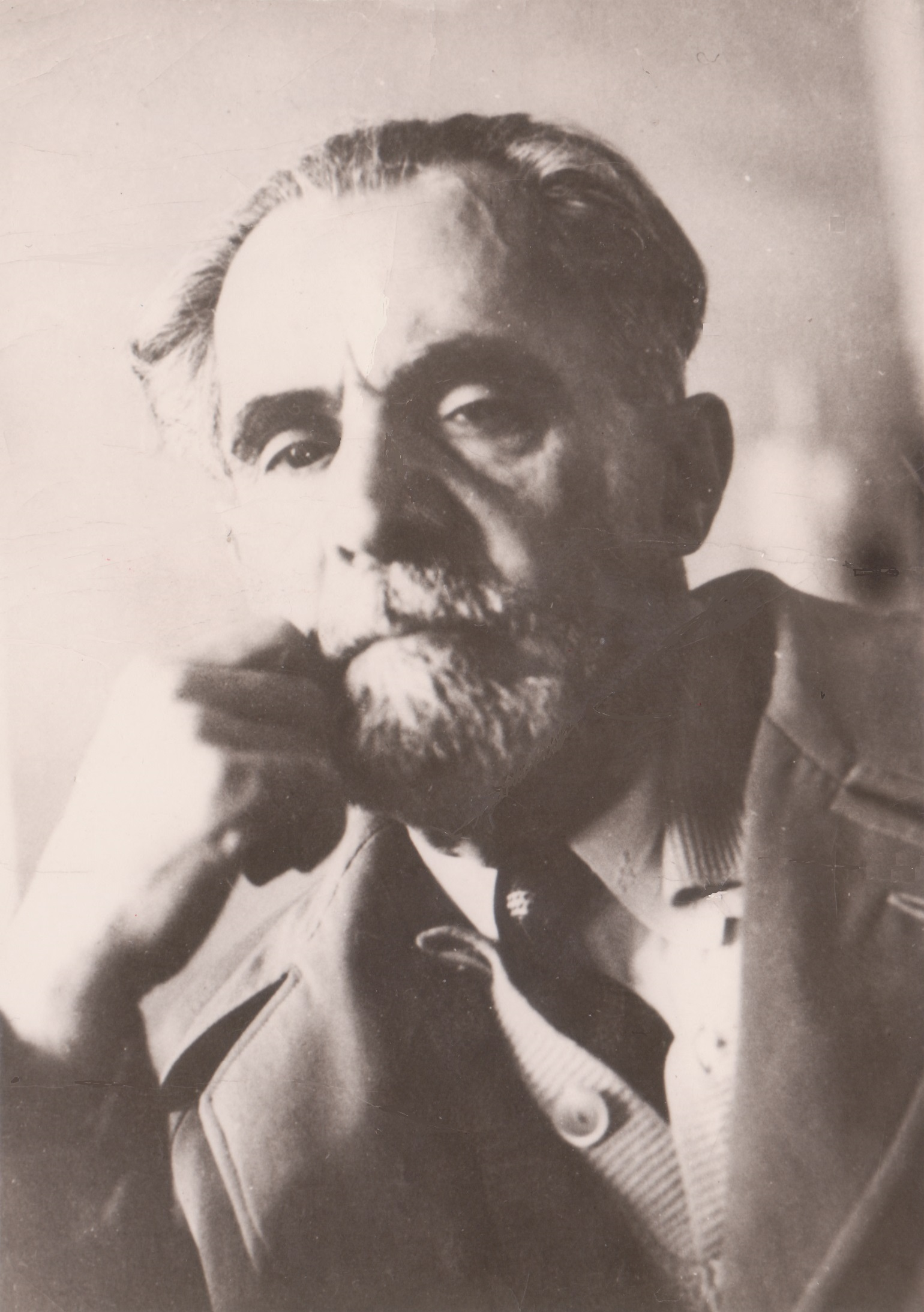
- Khayr al-Din in 1969
- Born: 1900; Aleppo, Ottoman Empire
- Died: December 29, 1971 (aged 70–71); Aleppo, Syria
- Occupation: Historian
- Notable work: Comparative Encyclopedia of Aleppo
- Honours: Order of Civil Merit (Syria)

Khayr al-Din al-Asadi (Arabic: خير الدين الأسدي) was a Syrian historian and a recipient of the Order of Civil Merit of the Syrian Arab Republic; First Class. He was born in 1900 in Aleppo, Syria, and died there in 1971. His father, Sheikh Omar “Assad” Ruslan, was a professor of morphology and Arabic at the Ottoman school located at Bab al-Nasr and Khusruwiyah school located near the entrance of the Citadel of Aleppo.

He was first educated at Shams al-Ma'arif school, where he learned some of the languages taught there such as Turkish, Persian, French and English, as well as Arabic. He is one of the founders of Al Adeyat Archaeological Society.

== Education ==
In 1907, he received his education at Shams al-Ma'arif school, which was then under the then Ottoman government, he then continued his education at Al-Ridhaiya and Al-Rashidiya school. Later, his father enrolled him in the Ottoman school. He continued his learning by reading, connecting with leading scholars and intellectuals of his time and working in the field of education. He was a teacher of Arabic at Farukia School and Haigazian School and he was always on the move. In 1946, he visited Palestine, Egypt, Turkey, Iraq, and Iran.

== Life ==
After the defeat of the Ottoman occupation of Syria, he was one of the first to teach Arabic at Farukia School. In 1923, he directed the play Independence (original: al-istiqlāl) to cultivate patriotism among students and form a resistance against French colonialism. During the play, a piece of gunpowder exploded in his hand, and that led to the amputation of his hand. He later quit Farukia School to teach Arabic at Haigazian School.

His father, Sheikh Omar Al Asadi, died in 1940. This impacted his life and made him turn to Sufi books such as, Abu al-Najib Suhrawardi, Abu Ishaq al-Shirazi, Ibn Arabi and Al-Hallaj. In 1945, Khayr al-Din al-Asadi became ill and decided to give his huge library away to a charity. He was persuaded by the then Governor of Aleppo Ihsan al-Sharif, mayor Majd al-Din al-Jabiri and the director of the National Library of Aleppo Omar Abu Risha to entrust his books to the National Library for a sum of money.

In 1950, he was elected Secretary of Al Adeyat Archaeological Society and remained in that position until his death.

In 1956, he quit his position as a teacher at the Arab-French Institute during the Suez Crisis against Egypt.

In 1961, poet Sulaiman al-Issa recommended that Al-Asadi be nominated for the State Recognition Award, but he never received the award during his lifetime.

In 1971, he moved to a nursing home in Aleppo and died there on 29 December 1971.

Al-Asadi was a member of the Arab Writers Union and Al Adeyat Archaeological Society. As he was interested in collecting antiquities, artifacts, pictures and music recordings, in 1951, he began working on his encyclopedia and finished it in 1956, when he continued his scientific expeditions visiting Yugoslavia, Hungary, Bulgaria and Austria. He also visited the North African region traveling to Libya, Tunisia, Morocco, and Spain.

== Works ==
He left many antiquities, but mostly manuscripts. In addition to what was previously mentioned, his works include: The Rules of Arabic Writing (original: Mawsūʻat Ḥalab al-muqāranah) and a poetry book he called Songs of the Sufi Dome.

His biggest achievement is said to be Comparative Encyclopedia of Aleppo; an encyclopedia of linguistics that took him 30 years to make. al-Asadi compiled Aleppo's intangible heritage of sayings, proverbs, customs, and news, and examined Aleppo Dialect in depth. The first edition of the encyclopedia was published by the University of Aleppo in 1981, nearly a decade after his death.

His works also include a manuscript, Aleppo's Neighborhoods and Markets, which was edited by Abd al-Fattah Qal'aji, and published by the Syrian Ministry of Culture in 1984.

- The Rules of Arabic Writing. The Scientific Press, Aleppo: 1923.
- Sky (article). Al Nahda Printing Press, Aleppo: 1940.
- Aleppo's Neighborhoods and Markets (study). Dar Kotaiba, Damascus: 1942.
  - An edition by Abdul-Fattah Qal'aji was released in 2011.
- Aleppo: The Linguistic Aspect of the Word. Al Dhad Press, Aleppo: 1951.
- The Dome Songs. Al Dhad Press, Aleppo: 1951.
- Oh Night (study). Al Dhad Press, Aleppo: 1957.

This is in addition to the many linguistic and literary articles published in some magazines, and the talks broadcast by Radio Aleppo.

== Awards ==
On January 11, 1983, Hafez al-Assad, President of the Syrian Arab Republic, awarded Khayr al-Din al-Asadi the Order of Civil Merit of the Syrian Arab Republic; First Class, posthumously.
