= Nazih =

Nazih is both a masculine given name and a surname. It is an Arabic origin word, (Arabic: نزيه). Notable people with the name include:

== Given name ==
- Nazih Abu Afach (born 1946), Syrian poet and painter
- Nazih Ayubi (1943–1995), Egyptian writer
- Nazih Deif (1923–1992), Egyptian economist
- Nazih Elasmar (born 1953), Australian politician
- Nazih Kawakibi (1946–2009), Syrian architect

== Surname ==
- Amjhad Nazih (born 2002), French football player
- Hasan Nazih (1921–2012), Iranian jurist and politician
- Hesham Nazih (born 1972), Egyptian composer
- Imran Nazih (born 2006), Dutch football player of Moroccan origin
