= Jekar Khourchid =

Syrian children's author

- Education: Al-Baath University in Homs
- Occupation: Children's writer
- Writing career
- Language: Arabic

Jekar Khourchid is a Syrian children's author. He studied Arabic literature at Al-Baath University in Homs. His first story collection "The Jackal and The Lion" won the 2006 Sharjah Award for Arab Creativity in children's literature. Khourchid stopped writing for a while due to his father's illness and death, and then returned to writing in 2012. He has published more than 120 books and nearly 100 books in print. In 2015, Khourchid left Syria and immigrated to the Netherlands.

== Biography ==
Jekar Khourchid lived his childhood in Aleppo and studied Arabic literature at Al-Baath University in Homs. His journey in writing began with vertical poetry, poetry in prose, political articles and stories that were published in Arabic and Syrian newspapers and magazines. When he wrote his first children's story collection, "The Jackal and The Lion", it won the 2006 Sharjah Award for Arab Creativity in children's literature. Khourchid stopped writing for a while due to his father's illness and death, he then returned to writing in 2012. He has more than 120 books and nearly 100 books in print.

In 2015, Khourchid left Syria due to the events at the time. He traveled first to Turkey, then decided to immigrate to the Netherlands. He wrote his story "The Immigrant Cat" based on what he saw in his immigration, which is available in the Bavarian State Library. Khourchid wrote about the suffering of children in the camps he passed through in Turkey and Greece, tens of thousands of those stories were distributed to the children of the camps.

Khourchid wrote "Nizar is the Referee", a children's story with a disabled protagonist, which has been translated to Georgian. His book "Beit Bayut" illustrated by Faris Karah's was shortlisted for the 2019 Etisalat Award for Arabic Children's Literature for the category of best illustrations. His story "I Am Not You" was shortlisted for the Sheikh Zayed Book Award for the Children's literature category for the year 2019. In 2020, his book Al-himar w al-bulbul (The Donkey and the Nightingale) illustrated by Ghazaleh Bigdelou was recommended for the International Youth Library’s White Ravens list.

== Works ==
Some of his works include:

- What do I say to my mother, Asala Publishers, 2015.
- The Mask, Asala Publishers, 2015.
- I am a bird I am a fish I am a cat, Asala Publishers, 2016.
- A Race in the Kingdom of Dreams, Dar Al Banan, 2016.
- House of Houses, Rabie Publishing House, 2016.
- Nizar is the Referee, Rabie Publishing House, 2016.
- Don't Leave Me Alone, Asala Publishers, 2017.
- I Am Not You, Al-Hadaek Group, 2018.
- The Seller of Joy, Asala Publishers, 2018.
- I see, Kalimat Group, 2019.

== See also ==
- Maqbula al-Shalak
- Osama Alomar
