= Alaa al-Qatrawi =

Dr. Alaa al-Qatrawi
- آلاء القطراوي
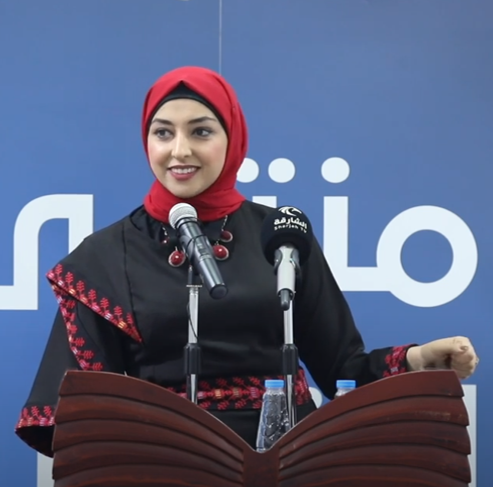
- Alaa in the Emirate of Sharjah in 2022.
- Born: November 3, 1990 (age 35); Gaza Strip, Palestine
- Education: Islamic University of Gaza (PhD in Arabic literature)
- Occupations: poet; essayist; educator
- Children: 4
- Relatives: Naïm Ali al-Qatrawi (Father)
- Writing career
- Pen name: Khansāʾ Filasṭīn ("خنساء فلسطين")
- Language: Arabic
- Website: alaaalqatrawi.com

Alaa al-Qatrawi reads an excerpt from Kashf al-ḥubb (The Unveiling of Love).

Alaa al-Qatrawi (Arabic: آلاء القطراوي, romanized: Ālāʾ al-Qaṭrāwī; born November 3, 1990) is a Palestinian poet and writer. In 2022, she won the Foundation of Abdulaziz Saud Al-Babtain's Prize for Poetic Creativity for her Diwan (collection) of poetry titled "A Waterwheel Trying to Sing", romanized: (Sāqiya tuḥāwilu al-ghinā’). Her literary career received wider attention after the death of her four children in December 2023, when their house in Khan Younis was bombed during the Gaza war.

== Early life and education ==
Alaa al-Qatrawi was born in the Gaza Strip on November 3, 1990. She is the daughter of Naim Ali al-Qatrawi, who was originally from Qatra, a Palestinian village depopulated in 1948. She completed her elementary and secondary education in Gaza before joining the Institute of Arabic Studies at the Islamic University of Gaza in 2008, where she continued her university studies. She earned her bachelor's, master's and doctoral degree in Arabic literature, graduating with a PhD in 2022.

== Career ==
In addition to being a poet and writer, Alaa al-Qatrawi worked as an Arabic language teacher in UNRWA schools. There, she developed various educational materials. She also served as a language editor for educational texts and adapted them into animated stories for the UNRWA channel.

al-Qatrawi has also worked in journalism and radio, hosting the poetry program "On the Euphrates of the poetry" on the Palestinian Ministry of Education's Educational Radio, and "Conversation of the soul" on the Islamic University of Gaza's radio.

=== Festival participation ===
Among her various festival participations, al-Qatrawi took part in the 7th season of the "Prince of Poets" competition in 2017. al-Qatrawi began by qualifying among the top 150 poets with her submitted poem, then progressed through improvisation rounds to reach the select group of the top twenty poets. She has appeared on television and represented Palestine on one of the major cultural stages in the Arab world.

=== Distinctions and honors ===
In 2022, al-Qatrawi was awarded Best Youth Poetry Collection Prize by Abdulaziz Saud al-Babtain Cultural Foundation for her collection "A Waterwheel Trying to Sing" (Sāqiyatun Tuḥāwilu al-Ghinā’). The prize carried a monetary value of US$10,000.

The competition drew participants from across the Arab world. in the 2021 edition, the "Best Youth Poetry Collection" category, in which al-Qatrawi was awarded, received 98 submissions out of a total of 826 entries across all prize categories.

al-Qatrawi received the Palestinian Creativity Award, established by the Kuwaiti poet and patron Souad al-Sabah, as part of " The Souad al-Sabah Prize for Literary Creativity 2023–2024 ", for her poetry collection titled "A Tent in the Sky" (Khayma fī al-Samāʾ). Al-Sabah stated that al-Qatrawi's poetry was selected for its profound themes, artistic mastery, and stylistic maturity. The poems depict the enduring tragedy faced by the people of Gaza and are inspired by al-Qatrawi's personal loss of her four children (Yamen, Kinan, Orchid, and Carmel) during an airstrike in Khan Yunis in December 2023.

In prose, al-Qatrawi also won first place in the Short Story category in the "Those Stories for Creativity" (Tilka al-Qiṣaṣ lil-Ibdāʿ) competition organized in cooperation between the Jordanian publishing house (Dār Faḍāʾāt li-l-Nashr wa-l-Tawzīʿ al-Urdunī) and China Intercontinental Press. Her story was subsequently translated into Chinese.

==== Other awards ====
- The Palestine Youth Creativity Award, 2011.
- Gold Medal for Best Poetry Collection, 2011.
- Best Poem in Palestine Award for "Desert's Lovers" (Āshiqat al-Ṣaḥrā), 2017.
- Outstanding Palestinian Women in the Field of Poetry, Ministry of Women's Affairs, 2018.
- Foundation of Abdulaziz Saud Al-Babtain's Prize for Poetic Creativity, for "A Waterwheel Trying to Sing" (Sāqiyatun Tuḥāwilu al-Ghinā’), 2022.
- Fadwa Tuqan Poetry Award - For the poetry collection "The Birds Steal My Bread" (Al-‘Aṣāfīru Tasriqu Khabzī), 2024.
- Antoun Saadeh Literary Prize - First prize in the theater category for the play "Orchid" (Urkīda), 2025.
- Khalifa Award "The Palm through poets's voices" - Third prize for the poem "The Exodus of The Palms" (Nuzūḥ al-Nakhīl), 2025.
- Souad al-Sabah Prize for Palestinian Creativity - For the poetry collection "A Tent in The Sky" (Khaymatun fī al-Samā’), 2025.

== Personal life ==
=== Killing of her four children during the Gaza war ===
On December 1, 2023, during military operations in Khan Yunis in southern Gaza Strip, Israeli forces surrounded the family home of Alaa al-Qatrawi's four children, who were living there with their father, grandmother, uncle, and uncle's wife. After several days of siege, al-Qatrawi was able to phone her children. Her 8-year-old son Yamen made intermittent phone calls to his mother, during which he reported that the occupying forces had blown up the water and gas facilities in their home, destroyed its contents, and that military vehicles had begun demolishing parts of the building and its surrounding wall, with tanks and snipers surrounding the area and preventing them from leaving.

These phone calls between al-Qatrawi and her children remained the only source of informations about their situation. Her older children, Yamen, Kinan and Orchid, expressed fear, while her youngest child, Carmel, kept calling for her mother. Carmel's calls were the last words al-Qatrawi heard from her children before communication was permanently cut off on December 13, 2023.

On February 21, 2024, it was confirmed that the home was completely destroyed by shelling, and all the children and family members inside were killed. There were later recovered from under the rubble.

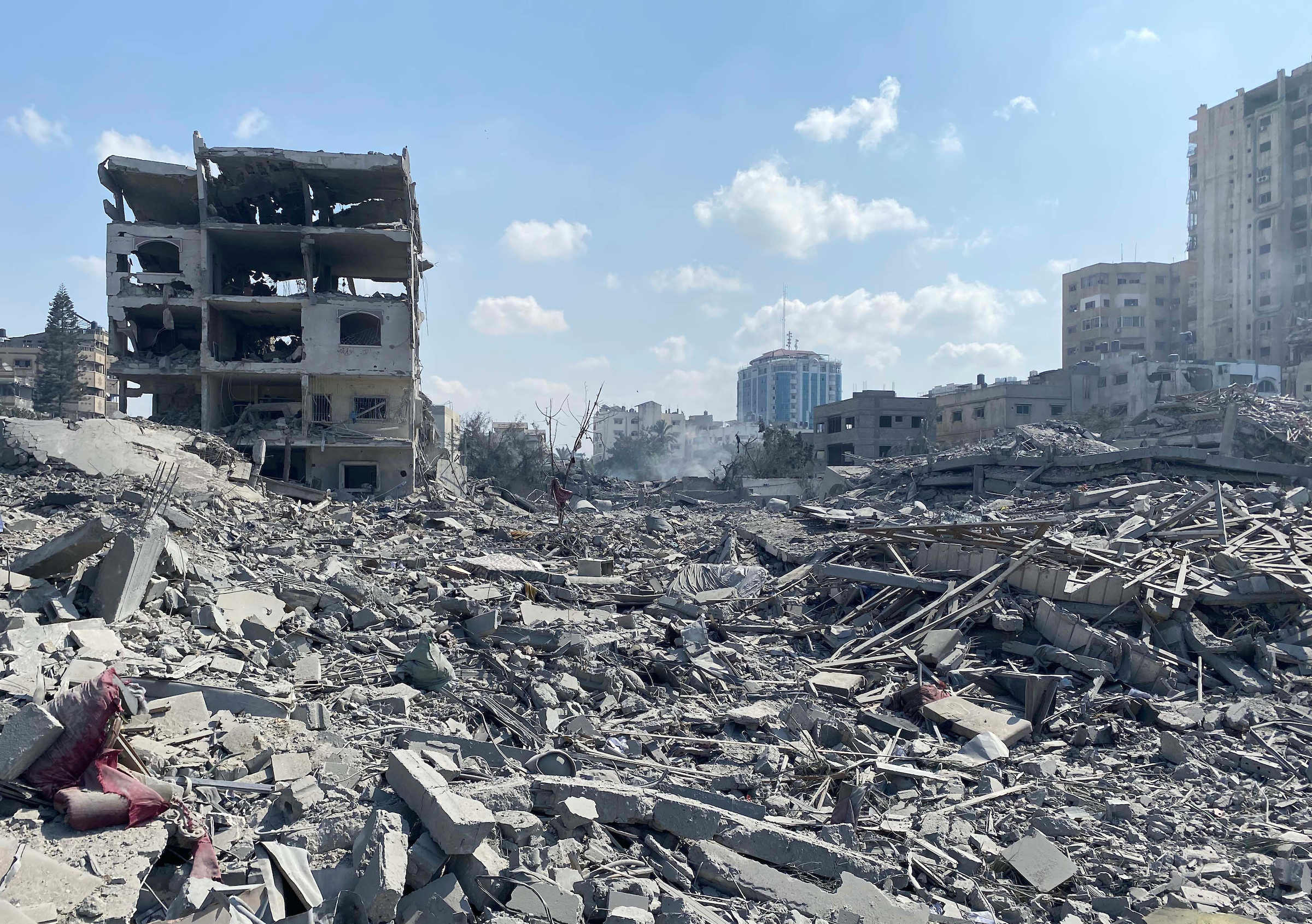
Damage in Gaza Strip during the October 2023 war.

== Recognition abroad ==
=== Media attention in Colombia ===
In September 2025, al-Qatrawi gained attention in Colombia after her open letter to President Gustavo Petro, published on the Sotour platform, and translated into English on Substack. The letter was read by President Petro, who wrote on September 28, 2025 at 7:26 PM, on his X account (formerly twitter): "Una carta me llega de Palestina.." (A letter reaches me from Palestine). A letter was read live on air by several journalists. Her letter expressed her appreciation for Petro's speech at the 80th session of the United Nations General Assembly (September 2025), in which he condemned what he described as "the genocide taking place in Gaza" and called on nations worldwide to act to liberate the Palestinian people from Israeli occupation.

=== Mother's March for the Children of Palestine ===
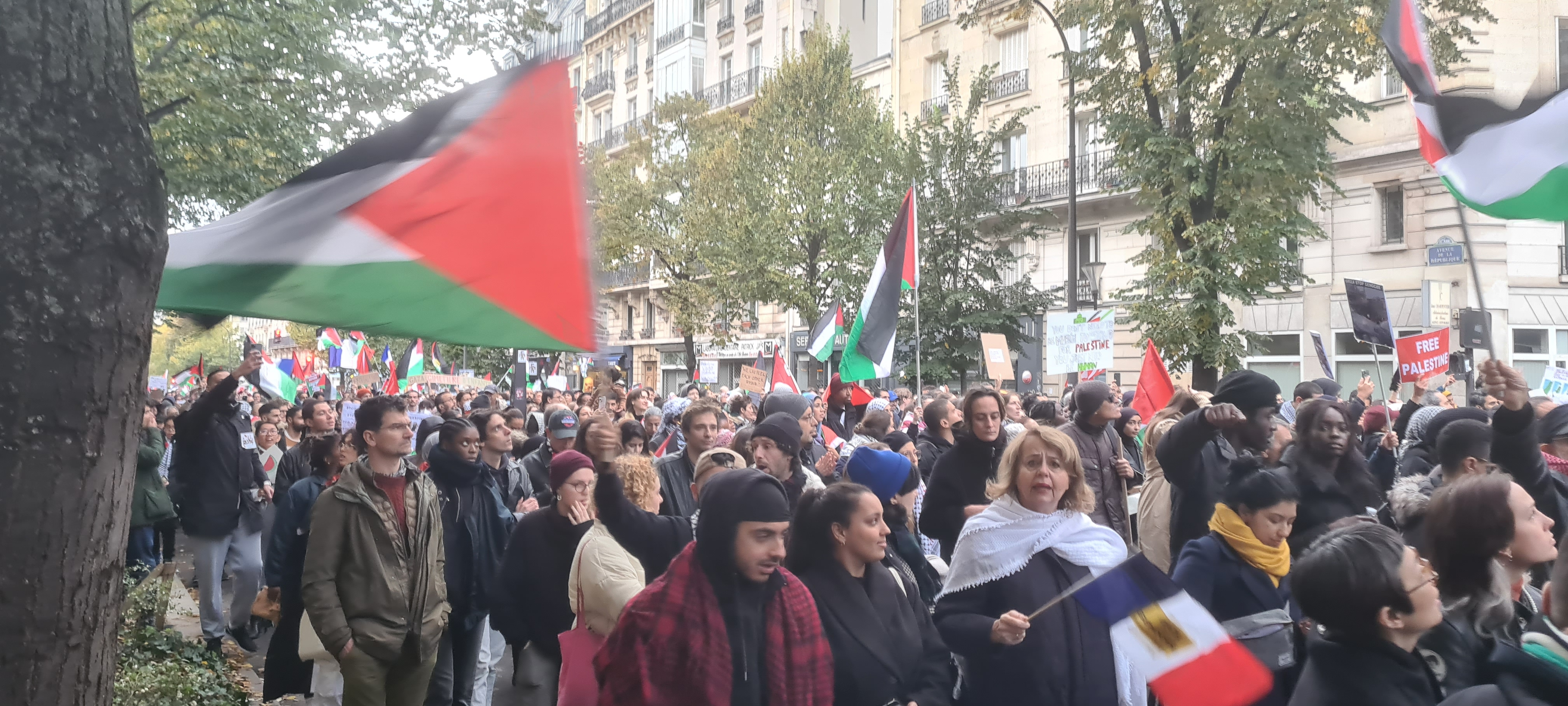
Protest in Paris to stop the massacres in Gaza

On 15 June 2025, a collective of mothers, led by French activist Céline Lebrun al-Ash'ath and her association team, organized a gathering at the Esplanade des Invalides in Paris. They called for a ceasefire, an end to the killing of children in Gaza, the entry of the humanitarian aid into the Gaza strip, and the protection of the rights of Palestinian children. During the event, Lebrun highlighted al-Qatrawi and her symbolic role as a representation of the steadfast Palestinian mother. al-Qatrawi's poem "Orchid" was recited in solidarity with her and with Palestinian mothers who had lost their children due to the Gaza war.

=== Drôme Solidarity Initiative in France ===
In September 2025, a group from the Drôme region of France, led by the French farmer and writer Mathieu Yon, organized a three-week sit-in near the French Parliament Building in Paris, calling for the evacuation of al-Qatrawi to France under the "PAUSE" program to enable her to continue her postdoctoral studies and research.

The initiative followed by Mathieu when he read al-Qatrawi's poem "My Orchid". He is deeply moved by the poem and by the situation in Gaza. He is initiated the demonstration as the public call to the French Government, which had suspended visa issuance for students from Gaza seeking to pursue their studies in France. The goal of this movement was to lift this suspension and allow Gazan students to enter France, with al-Qatrawi at the forefront. The initiative received support from many French public figures including members of parliament, poets and activists.

=== Marcel Khalifa's song tribute ===
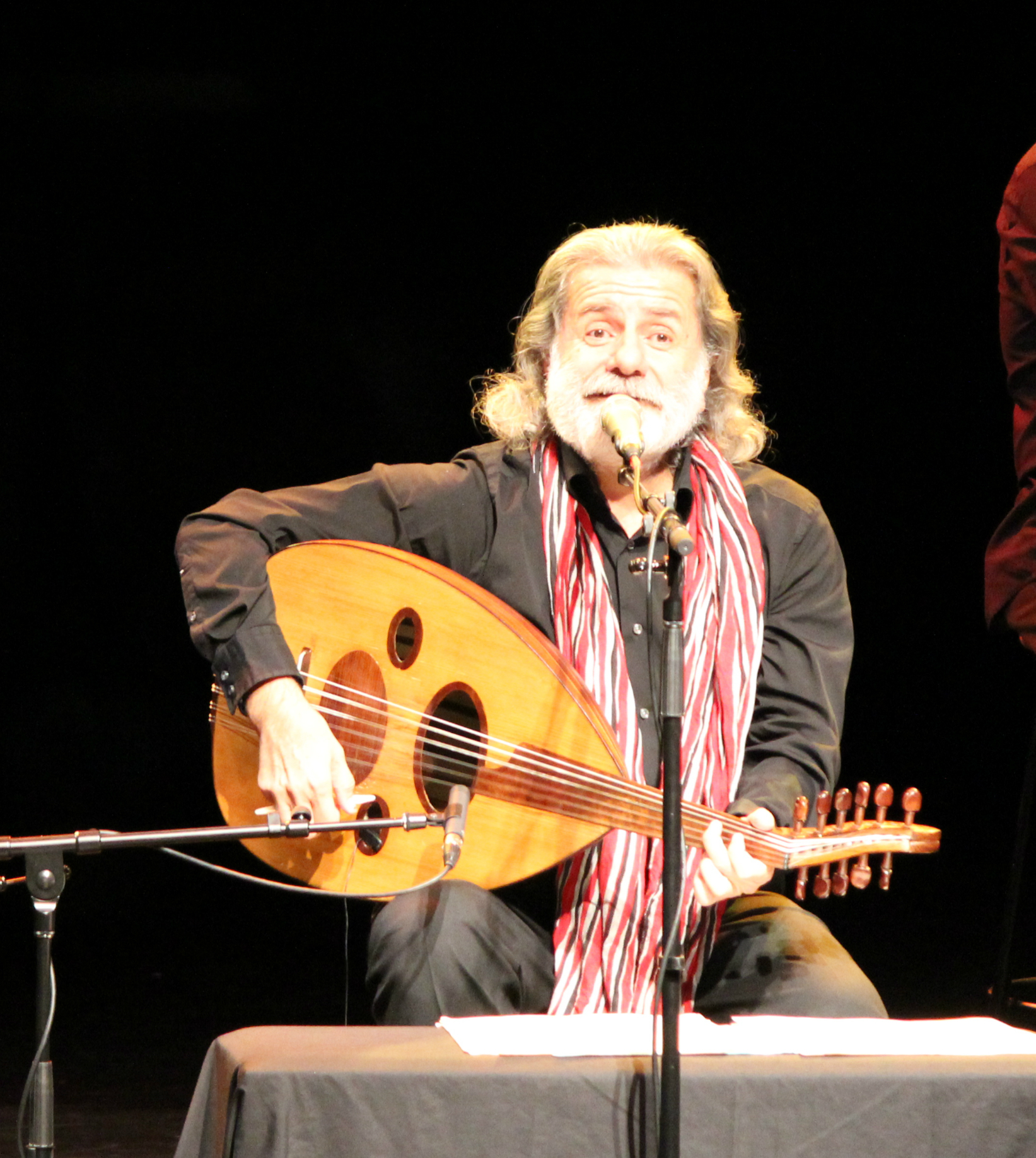
Marcel Khalifa

In January 2025, after the first ceasefire in Gaza, the Lebanese composer and singer Marcel Khalifa dedicated the song "Oh Breeze of the wind" (Ya Nassīm al-Rīḥ) to Alaa al-Qatrawi. The dedication was inspired after he hearing one of her essays which deeply moved him. The dedication was seen as a gesture of solidarity and admiration for al-Qatrawi's poetry work reflecting the endurance and grief of Palestinian mothers.

The tribute introduced al-Qatrawi's work to a broader Arab and international audience, reinforcing cultural and humanitarian ties between Lebanon and Palestine.

== Works ==
=== Poetry collections (Diwan) ===
- When the Air Trembles [Ḥīna Yartajifu al-Hawā’]. Palestinian Writers and Authors Association. 2021.
- A Waterwheel Traying to Sing [Sāqiyatun Tuḥāwilu al-Ghinā’]. Abu Dhabi Poetry Academy. 2021.
- The Birds Steal My Bread [Al-‘Aṣāfīru Tasriqu Khabzī]. Mosaic Publishing and Distribution. 2022.
- A Tent in the Sky [Khaymatun fī al-Samā’]. Souad al-Sabah publishing. 2025.
- My Butterfly That Never Dies [Farāshatī allatī Lā Tamūt]. Arab Fondation for Studies and Publishing. 2025.
- The Butterfly's Ascent [ʿUrūj al-Farāsha]. Arab Foundation for Studies and Publishing. 2026.

=== Prose ===
- Alaa, al-Qatrawi; Rana, al-Ali (2015). From Distance Zero- Letters under War [Mina al-Masāfati Ṣifr – Rasā’ilun Taḥta al-Ḥarb]. al-Qamari Publishing.
- Kinan Is Speaking To Me [Yukallimunī Kinān]. Arab Foundation for Studies and Publishing. 2025.

=== Literary criticism ===
- Mirrors In Adonis's Poetry: A Semiotic Study [Al-Marāyā fī Shi‘r Adonis]. Mosaic Publishing and Distribution. 2022.

=== Poetic plays ===
- Orchid [Urkīda]. Dar al-Fikr for Publishing. 2025.
