= Sulaiman al-Issa =

Syrian poet (1921–2013)

Sulaiman al-Issa سليمان العيسى
- Born: 1921; Al-Nairiyah, Sanjak of Alexandretta, Syria
- Died: 9 August 2013 (aged 91–92); Damascus, Syria
- Other names: The Poet of Childhood (Arabic: شاعر الطفولة)
- Occupations: Poet, educator
- Writing career
- Genres: Poetry, children's literature
- Notable awards: Lotus Prize (1982); Al-Babtain Prize for Poetic Creativity (2000); Syrian Order of Merit (2005); Yemeni Unity Medal (2005)

Sulaiman al-Issa (Arabic: سليمان العيسى) was a prominent Syrian poet and educator, renowned for his contributions to Arabic poetry and literature, particularly in the field of children's literature. He was also a noted advocate for Arab unity and nationalism, themes that pervade much of his work.

== Early life and education ==
Sulaiman al-Issa was born in 1921 in the village of Al-Nairiyah, near Antioch in Syria (modern-day in Hatay, Turkey). He received his early education at his father Sheikh Ahmad al-Issa' kuttab. Under his father's guidance, he memorized the Quran, the pre-Islamic odes (Mu'allaqat), and the works of Al-Mutanabbi, along with thousands of lines of Arabic poetry. By the age of nine or ten, al-Issa began writing his own poetry, compiling a small collection of his earliest works.

He attended primary school in Antioch before fleeing to Syria with his family after the annexation of the Sanjak of Alexandretta by Turkey in 1939. Al-Issa completed his secondary education in Hama, Latakia, and Damascus amidst a turbulent period of political unrest.

He went to prison many times as a result of his stances and poems against the French authorities in Syria.

== Career ==
In 1944, al-Issa enrolled as a teacher at the Higher Teachers' College in Baghdad, Iraq, where he continued to refine his poetic craft. After graduating in 1947, he returned to Aleppo, Syria, and worked as a teacher of Arabic literature. Over the next two decades, al-Issa became widely known for his poetic contributions, which were characterized by their nationalistic fervor and celebration of Arab unity.

Al-Issa later moved to Damascus in 1967, where he served as a senior Arabic language supervisor in the Syrian Ministry of Education. Following the June 1967 Arab-Israeli War, he shifted his focus to children's literature, producing work that included poems, stories, and plays for young readers.

== Contributions and affiliations ==
Al-Issa was one of the founding members of the Arab Writers Union in 1969 and served as the editor-in-chief of Al-Mu'allim al-Arabi (The Arab Teacher) magazine. He was also a member of the Shiir (Poetry) Society, founded by poets such as Adunis and Yusuf al-Khal.

He participated in the establishment of the Syrian Ba'ath Party.

== Literary style and legacy ==
Sulaiman al-Issa's poetry was deeply rooted in classical Arabic traditions while also addressing contemporary social and political issues. His works often celebrated the themes of Arab nationalism, unity, and resistance against colonialism. Later in life, his focus shifted to children's literature, where he sought to instill pride in Arab heritage and cultural values.

== Honors and awards ==
Al-Issa received many honors including:

- Lotus Prize for Literature (1982)
- Honorary Doctorate from Sana'a University (1997)
- Foundation of Abdulaziz Saud Al-Babtain's Prize for Poetic Creativity (2000)
- Order of Civil Merit of the Syrian Arab Republic, first class (2005)
- Yemeni Unity Medal, awarded by Yemeni President Ali Abdullah Saleh (2005)

== Personal life ==
Al-Issa was married to Dr. Malika Abiad, with whom he collaborated on translations of literary works. They had three children: Ma'n, Ghailan, and Badia.

In addition to Arabic, al-Issa was proficient in French, English, and Turkish.

== Death ==
Sulaiman al-Issa died on 9 August 2013 at age 92 in Damascus and was buried there.

== See also ==
- Syrian literature
- List of Syrian poets
