= Sattar Alvi =

Pakistani Air Force pilot (born 1944)

Air Commodore Sattar Alvi SJ, SI(M)
- Born: Abdus Sattar Alvi; 1944 (age 81–82); Jalandhar sammipur, British Punjab, British India
- Military career
- Allegiance: Pakistan
- Branch: Pakistan Air Force
- Service years: 1963–1998
- Rank: Air-Commodore
- Nickname: Master of Migs
- Service number: PAK-4534
- Units: No. 11 Squadron Arrows
- Commands: PAF Base Rafiqui; Combat Commanders' School
- Conflicts: Indo-Pakistani War of 1965; Air war operations; Indo-Pakistani War of 1971; Yom-Kippur War
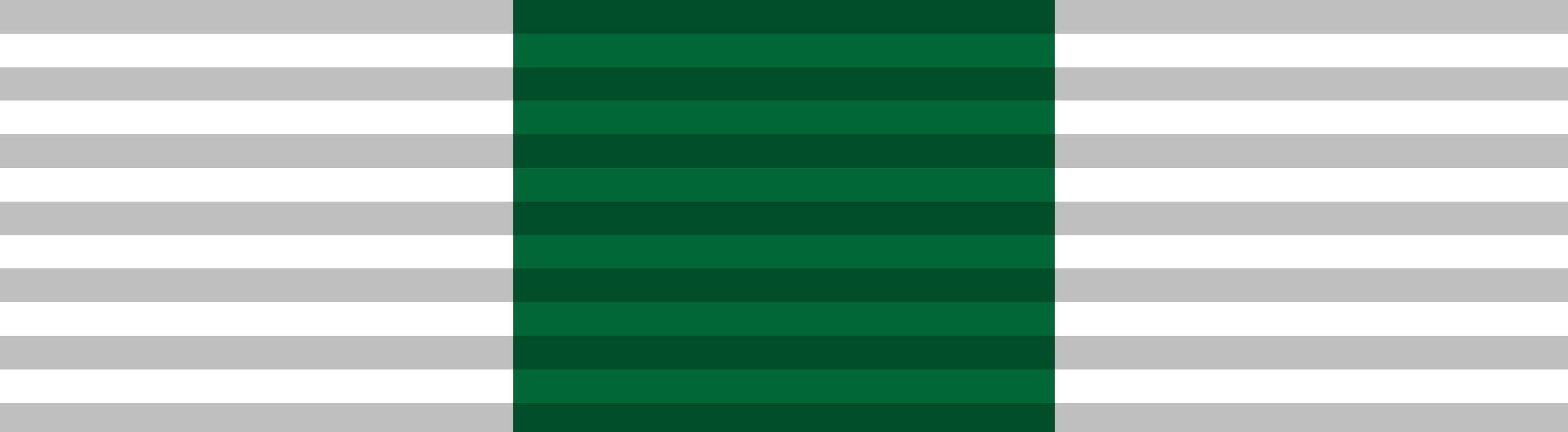
- Awards: Sitara-e-Jurat Sitara-e-Imtiaz (Military)
- Other work: Flight instructor

Abdus Sattar Alvi (Punjabi, Urdu: عبد الستار علوی), SJ, SI(M), is a retired one-star rank air officer and a fighter pilot in the Pakistan Air Force, who is renowned for his gallant actions during the third Indo-Pakistani in 1971, and served as a military advisor in the Syrian Air Force during the Yom Kippur War of 1973.

According to modern sources, in 1974, Alvi shot down the Israeli Air Force's Mirage III over the dogfight took place in Golan Heights in Syria, and was honored for his bravery with gallantry war-time medals by Syrian and Pakistan government. However, no major sources from the time reported on such an incident.

== Biography ==
Sattar Alvi was born in Sammipur, Jalandhar, Punjab, British India in 1944, into a Punjabi family that had the military background. His father was an officer in the British Indian Army who later served in the Pakistan Army. He was educated at the Bannu where he did his matriculation and attended the Emerson College in Multan, Punjab where he secured his graduation.

In 1963, he was accepted to join the Air Force Academy in Risalpur where he received his flight training on the Cessna T-37T, and graduated in General Duty Pilot (GD) course in 1965. Pilot Officer Alvi participated in the second war with India in 1965, touring his duty as "Mail Runners" to convey messages from one base to another, served on this assignment until the war was ended.

From 1966 to 1971, Flight Lieutenant (Captain) Alvi was selected in the military adviser group for the Iraqi Air Force, where he qualified as a test pilot for the MiG-21 and sat up the training school for the Iraqi IAF. He returned to Pakistan to participate in the third war with India and flew the Quick Reaction Close Support Missions especially in Shakargarh, where the battle with the Indian IAF was the most turbulent. After the war in 1971, Flt.Lt Alvi was sent to join the faculty at the Air Force Academy and served as a flight instructor on the flight manuals on the F-7P, a Chinese variant of MiG-21F.

=== Yom Kippur War ===
Pakistani Prime Minister Zulfikar Ali Bhutto sought to maintain close relationships with the Arab world. When the Yom Kippur War broke out, Alvi was one of the Pakistan Air Force fighter pilots who volunteered to go to the Middle East to support Egypt and Syria. By the time they arrived, however, Egypt and Israel had already concluded a ceasefire, and only Syria remained in an active state of war against Israel. Alvi, who was serving as a flight lieutenant in 1973, joined the Syrian Air Force along with Arif Manzoor. The Pakistani fighter pilots flew in a formation using the call-sign "Shahbaz" under the command of Squadron Leader Arif Manzoor.

=== Aerial fight over Golan ===
On 26 April 1974, Alvi was flying a SAF MiG-21F-13 (Serial No. 1863) on deputation to No. 67A Squadron, Syrian Air Force (SAF) out of Dumayr Air Base, Syria, in an eight-ship formation with a fellow PAF pilot and the flight leader, Squadron Leader Arif Manzoor. He managed to shoot down an Israeli Mirage III piloted by Captain Lutz, while the wingman quickly disengaged, and Captain Lutz later succumbed to wounds he sustained during ejection.

== Post war ==
After the war, Sattar Alvi was promoted to wing commander and went on to command PAF's elite Combat Commanders' School and the premier PAF Base Rafiqui. In 1994, he was promoted to air commodore and commanded the Pakistan Aeronautical Complex (PAC) until 1998. He retired as an air commodore in 1998 and received an honourable discharge from the air force.

== Awards and decorations ==
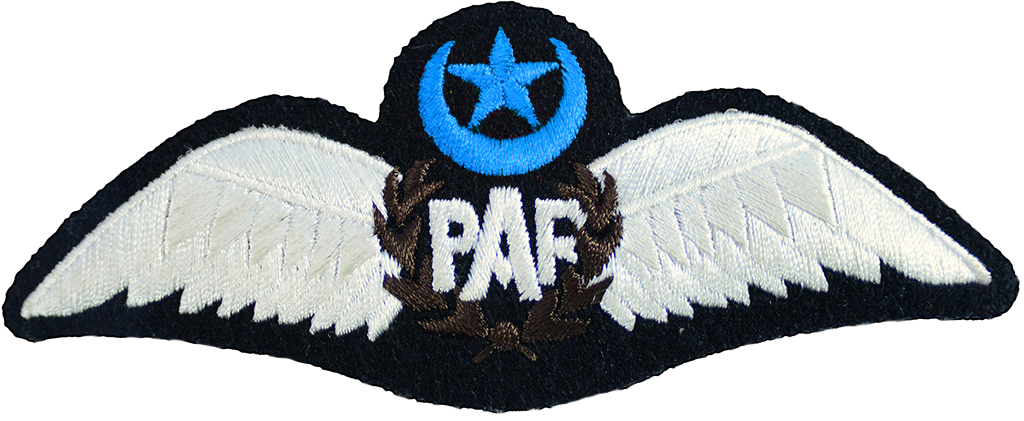

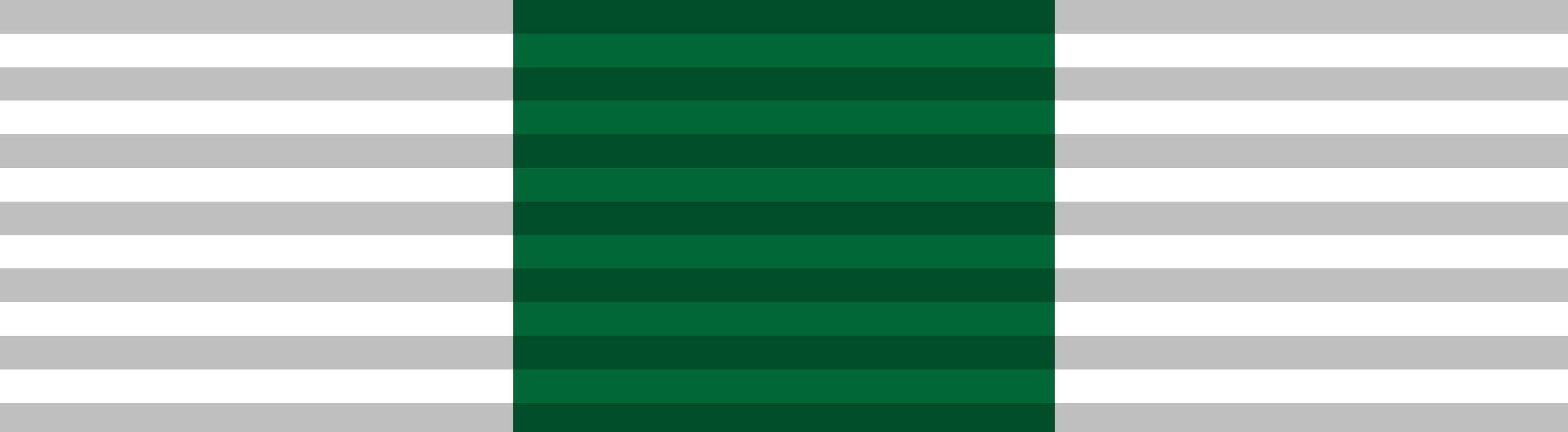

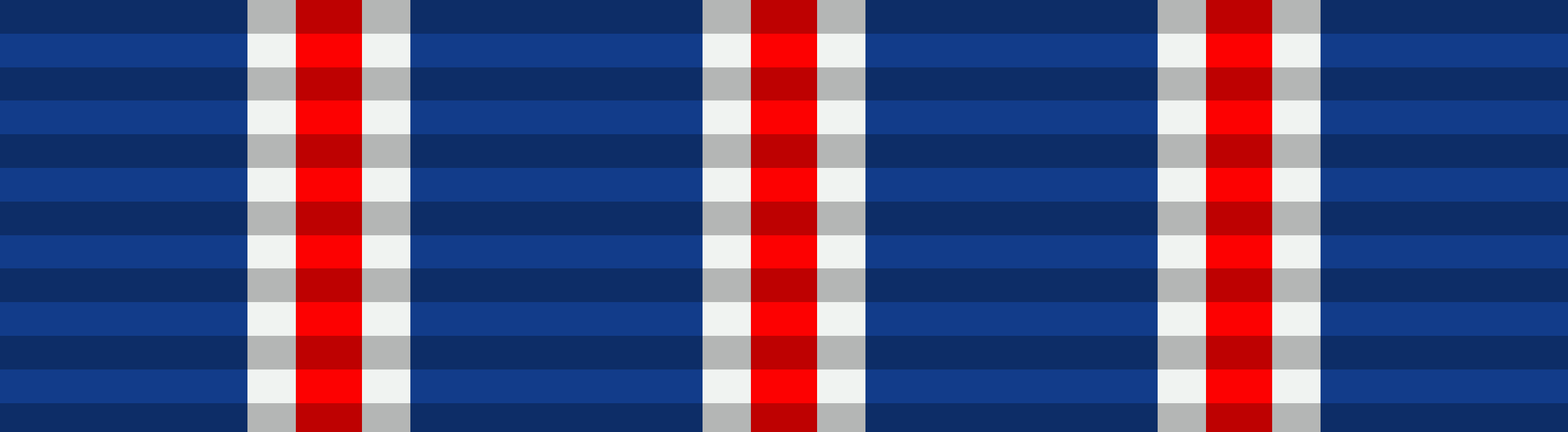

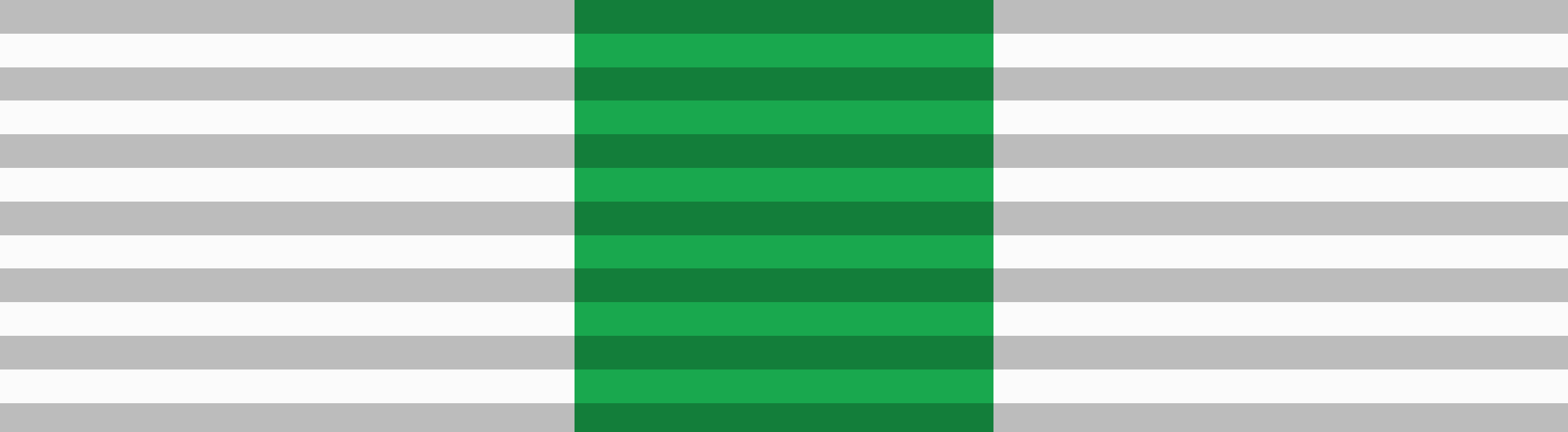

Sitara-e-Jurat (Star of Courage)	Sitara-e-Imtiaz (Military) (Star of Excellence)	Sitara-e-Harb 1965 War (War Star 1965)	Sitara-e-Harb 1971 War (War Star 1971)
Tamgha-e-Jang 1965 War (War Medal 1965)	Tamgha-e-Jang 1971 War (War Medal 1971)	10 Years Service Medal	20 Years Service Medal
30 Years Service Medal	Tamgha-e-Sad Saala Jashan-e- Wiladat-e-Quaid-e-Azam (100th Birth Anniversary of Muhammad Ali Jinnah)	Hijri Tamgha (Hijri Medal)	Jamhuriat Tamgha (Democracy Medal)
Qarardad-e-Pakistan Tamgha (Resolution Day Golden Jubilee Medal) 1990	Tamgha-e-Salgirah Pakistan (Independence Day Golden Jubilee Medal) 1997	Order of Bravery (Wisam al Shujaa)	Order of Merit (Wisam al Istehqaq)

=== Foreign Decorations ===
Foreign Awards
Syria	Order of Bravery (Wisam al Shujaa)
Syria	Order of Merit (Wisam al Istehqaq)

== See also ==
- Group Captain Saiful Azam
- Sarfaraz Ahmed Rafiqui
- Mervyn Middlecoat
- Muhammad Mahmood Alam
- Marium Mukhtiar
- Ayesha Farooq
- 8-Pass Charlie
