= Muhammad Salim Barakat =

- Born: 1930; Damascus
- Died: 5 June 1999 (aged 68–69); Damascus
- Resting place: Damascus
- Citizenship: Syria
- Education: BA in Arabic Language and Literature - The Department of Philosophy and Oriental Languages in Ain Shams University in Cairo. Two post-graduate diplomas in pedagogy and psychology - The High Institute of Pedagogy in Ain Shams University in Cairo.
- Occupations: Writer, poet, translator, teacher
- Writing career
- Language: Arabic - French
- Notable awards: "Chevalier dans l'ordre des Palmes Académiques" 1978 "Officier dans l'ordre de Palmes Académiques" 1995

Muhammad Salim Barakat (Arabic: محمد سليم بركات) was an Arab writer, translator and teacher of Arabic language. He has trained outstanding French university teachers of Arabic and Orientalist scholars at the end of the 20th century such as Jean-Yves L'hopital, George Bohas, Lidia Bettini, Anne Regourd, and Thierry Bianquis. He was born in Damascus in 1930 and died in it in 1999. He is not to be confused with his homonym, the Kurdish-Syrian novelist and poet Salim Barakat.

== Life ==
Muhammad Salim Barakat came from a religious background. His father, Muhammad ibn Jaafar al-Kassar, a Shafii Muslim, served as the imam and preacher of al-Innaba mosque in Bab Sarija in old Damascus, He belongs to an old Damascene family, as cited in the encyclopaedia of Damascene families 1/222, according to Al-Babiteen Dictionary of Arab Poets

Barakat grew up in Damascus. He moved to Cairo in Egypt and graduated from the Department of Philosophy and Oriental Languages in the College of Arabic Language in Ain Shams University, then obtained two post-graduate diplomas in pedagogy and psychology from the High Institute of Pedagogy at the same university.

== Work ==
When in Egypt, he met with Taha Hussein, Tawfiq al-Hakim and Abbas Mahmoud al-Akkad, and was influenced by their literature, and also by Nasserism. He returned to Damascus and worked as a teacher of Arabic language. He was a member of research and studies association. He worked in the French Institute for Arabic Studies in Damascus (IFEAD: Institut Francais d’Etudes Arabes de Damas, later known as IFPO: Institut Français du Proche Orient) from 1970 to 1999. He was sent as a professor of Arabic literature and Orientalism to the INALCO (Institut National des Langues et Civilisations Orientales) in Paris, which is a Sorbonne institution, from 1991 to 1994.

His most notable contribution include:

- His translation of "Le voile du nom : essai sur le nom propre arabe", by Jacqueline Sublet, from French into Arabic, which was published by the IFPO.
- His article, "Les inscriptions de la maison Sibai", in collaboration with French scholar Jean-Yves L'Hopital, and Nabil Al-Lao was published by the Bulletin d'Etudes Orientales in 2001.
- He was a member of the Arab Writer's Union, headquartered in Damascus

== Posterity ==
Upon his death in 1999, a hall was named after him in the INALCO, and another in the IFPO in Damascus. He was also mourned by the French newspaper Le Monde in its issue of 9 June 1999. Dominique Mallet also, a French scholar, wrote from Cairo an obituary "In memoriam of Salim Mohammed Barakat".

He was married to Farideh Al-Fawakhiri (1941–2011), and a father of Nouar (F 1968), Maha (F 1969), Mouhammad (M 1970), Charif (M 1972), Ahmad (M 1976), and Reem (F 1985). A street has been allocated to carry his name in central Damascus in Al-Mouhajireen quarter (his own quarter), but is still pending because of the civil war that has erupted in March 2011.

== Bibliography ==
- Sublet, Jacqueline, and Salīm M. Barakāt. Ḥiṣn Al-Ism : Qirāʹāt Fī Al-Asmāʹ Al-ʻarabiyya =: Le Voile Du Nom : Essai Sur Le Nom Propre Arabe. Damas: Institut français de Damas, 1999
- BARAKĀT, Salīm Muḥammad, Nabīl AL-LAO, and Jean-Yves L'HÔPITAL. 2001. “LES INSCRIPTIONS DE LA MAISON SIBĀ'Ī”. Bulletin D'études Orientales 53/54. Institut Francais du Proche-Orient: 181–227. JSTOR 41608508.

== Awards ==
In 1978, he was awarded the "Chevalier dans l'ordre des Palmes Académiques", and in 1995, the "Officier dans l'ordre de Palmes Académiques" by the French Ministry of Education.
