= Khalaf Ali Alkhalaf =

Swedish writer

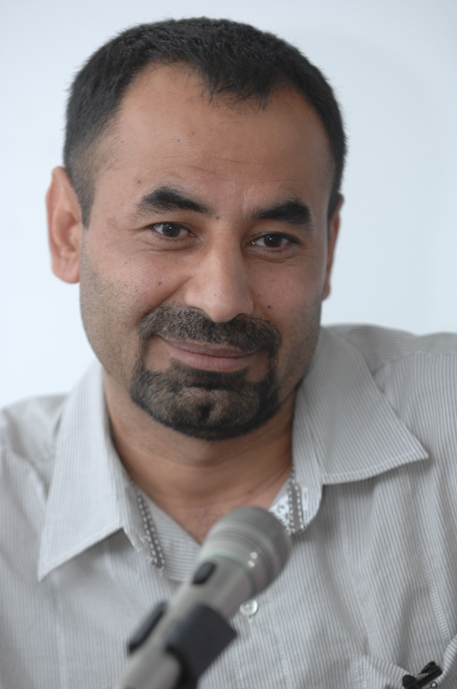
- Khalaf Ali Alkhalaf
- Born: 10 November 1969 (age 56); Raqqa, Syria
- Known for: Poet, writer and political activism

Khalaf Ali Alkhalaf (Arabic: خلف علي الخلف; born 10 November 1969 in Raqqa, Syria) is a Syrian poet and writer who holds Swedish citizenship. He lived in Saudi Arabia (1993–2001) and Greece (2001–2002) before returning to Syria and, once again, Saudi Arabia. In the spring of 2008, Alkhalaf moved to Alexandria, Egypt, where he currently resides.

== Biography ==
Alkhalaf's first book, N of Shepherds, appeared in 2004. At the end of 2005, he founded the website Jidar, an independent cultural platform in support of freethinking as well as beginning and independent writers. Jidar has been rated first among the Syrian culture websites. The Syrian government blocked the website later. Alkhalaf had been called for investigation by the Syrian Intelligence authorities almost every time he published one of his works. The last investigation call Alkhalaf received by them was in the summer of 2007.

Later that year, Alkhalaf travelled to Saudi Arabia, where he continued writing articles criticising the Syrian government and calling for a democratic alternative. He also wrote an article titled "A Public Self-Declaration to the Syrian Security Authorities", and he could not return to Syria until 2013, when Raqqa was no longer controlled by Bashar al-Assad's government.

In September 2008, Alkhalaf, together with other Arab writers (Hamed Bin Aqeel and Suzan Khawatmi), founded Jidar for Culture and Publishing, a non-profit publishing house. At this time, Jidar began publishing many books, especially those criticizing the Assad regime, and diaries of Syrian prisoners.

He has regularly published his work in the newspaper Elaph since 2003, and his writings have also appeared on other websites and blogs like Jidar and Ahewar. He has also published in many Arabic-language newspapers.

Alkhalaf was awarded a prize at the Fujairah International Monodrama Festival competition in 2009. He won the second prize by writing the script of a monodrama called "Gilgamesh Wears Tennis Shoes."

In addition to Elaph, Alkhalaf has published on newspaper and magazines sites in the Arab world.

Khalaf studied Economics at the University of Aleppo. Additionally, he studied International Relations at Malmö University, Content Production at Malmö Yrkeshögskola, he has a Master's program in Journalism at Södertörn University. He Also Studied Digital Humanities at Kalmar University,

== Bibliography ==
- 2004 N of Shepherds – poetry
- 2007 Al Tanzeel – poetry
- 2008 Kouhl of Desire – poetry
- 2008 Stranger's Howling, a tale never been knocked by a bird – poetry
- 2009 Poems on a Single Shoe – poetry
- 2010 Gilgamesh Wears Tennis Shoes – Monodrama
- 2010 About the Country Without Hope: Al Assad Jr...His kingdom and his opposition – Political articles
- 2011 Black and White Votes – Dialogues with writers
- 2012 Two Facts and One Actor – Monodrama
- 2013 Najla Bah and Qaradawi are Two Sides of the Same Coin – Political articles
- 2015 Diaries of Present Wartime – poetry
- 2016 Diaries of Present Wartime – poetry English translation
- 2017 I am from Islamic State – Monodrama
- 2018 Diaries of Present Wartime – poetry German translation
- 2019 It is All About Senses – poetry
- 2021 The Sumerian Harranians – On Origin and Beliefs of Agrarian Class in Mesopotamia and Euphrates (with Qussai Muslat Alhwaidi)
- 2024 Let us Writ About Sweden – poetry
- 2024 Called Blind – poetry
- 2025 Complete poetic works – Poetry
- 2025 A lone actor on an abandoned stage – Complete Monodramatic Works
- 2025 Al Harrani – Novel

== Awards ==
- Second prize award of Ali Al-Safi poetry 2005 in Kuwait for his poem: "My Lord! My Black Unmatched to Tears; Lord" "مولاي.. يا أسوداً لايضاهى بدمع."
- At the Fujairah International Monodrama Festival competition in 2009. Second prize for his script of a monodrama called "Gilgamesh Wears Tennis Shoes."

== Political and cultural activities ==
Before the Syrian revolution began, Alkhalaf was known for his cultural activities and his criticism of the Assad regime. He began his political activity during the Arab Spring, which unleashed the Syrian civil war while he was living in Egypt. He helped organise the first demonstration in front of the Syrian embassy in Cairo to demand the toppling of the regime. He and other demonstrators were assaulted by embassy staff and security. Later, Alkhalaf began covering the events of the Syrian revolution from Egypt, through various Arabic-language satellite channels, newspapers and websites. He also participated with a group of activists in the establishment of the Coalition of Democratic Voices, the first political rally held during Syria's revolution.

Alkhalaf was also one of the main organizers of the Syria Conference for Change that took place in the Turkish city of Antalya on 31 May–3 June 2011. The conference was held to support the Syrian civil war and help find solutions to save Syria from tyranny. It was widely considered to be the first extended conference in the history of the Syrian opposition.

From the beginning of the Syrian civil war, Alkhalaf called for continued nonviolent resistance and peaceful protests against the Bashar government. Nonetheless, he has opposed the militarisation of the civil war, which he said would destroy the country: "Arming the uprising will lead us to the whirlpool of civil war, and using force [ourselves] will put us in the court of the regime where the master plays." He wrote many articles and studies that explain why civil resistance works.

In April 2012, Alkhalaf participated with more than 60 other Syrian political and cultural figures in establishing the Syrian Democratic Platform (SDP). He was elected as a member of its leadership, and later was re-elected in the first conference of the SDP held in Cairo in April 2012. The SPD was essentially a cultural gathering that called for an intellectual and political approach to democratic change in Syria. It did not last long, due to the direction and militarisation of the civil war.

At the end of 2012, Alkhalaf participated in a group of Syrian nonviolence activists for the establishment of an "our rights movement" called Haquna. This was a youth movement of civil protest, calling for change through peaceful means. It had been active in the northern Syrian city of Raqqa after the city was no longer in the control of the Bashar regime. The Haquna movement also led actions of nonviolent resistance in Raqqa following its occupation by the Islamic extremist group ISIS from January 2014 to October 2017. Alkhalaf helped train Haquna members in nonviolent action.

Haquna's nonviolent resistance has also led to friction with anti-Bashar revolutionary groups such as Jabhat Al-Nusra (at one time affiliated with Al-Qaeda), Ahrar al-Sham, and ISIS, notably after the latter killed three Syrians at the main square in Raqqa. Haquna had already organised a sit-in for three days at the same square in Raqqa when ISIS arrested some of its members. One of the protesters remains unaccounted for.

In May 2013 Alkhalaf participated in a preparatory conference committee for the establishment of the Syrian Democratic Union. He was a member of the committee during the Syrian Democratic Union's first conference, held in Istanbul in September 2013.

Alkhalaf co-founded the Syrian Writers Association, which was established in 2012 as an alternative to the regime-controlled Arab Writers Union. He co-founded the Syrian Journalists Association in February 2013, wrote its statutes and became a member of its membership committee. He also co-founded the Association of Syrian Writers and Journalists in December 2017 in Malmö, Sweden, where helped write its rules of procedure and eventually became its chairman.

== See also ==
Syrian civil war
