= Genan Wakil =

Syrian poet and writer (born 1996)

Genan Wakil (also spelt Jinan Wakeel; in Arabic: جنان وكيل) (born 1996) is a Syrian poet and writer.

== Biography ==
Wakil was born in Lattakia, Syria. She studied law at Tishreen University. She has participated in several poetry occasions and her poem "I am not for them" won the 2016 Arab Writers Union Award.

In 2018, Wakil represented the fields of literature and poetry and won third place in the television program Stars Without Borders (نجوم بلا حدود).
