= Abdulaziz Al-Babtain =

Kuwaiti poet and businessman (1936–2023)

Abdulaziz Saud Albabtain (1936 – 15 December 2023) (Arabic: عبدالعزيز سعود البابطين) was a Kuwaiti poet, businessman, and philanthropist.

He was the Founder and Head of Abdulaziz Saud Albabtain Cultural Foundation, based in Kuwait. The foundation is dedicated to Arabic poetry and literature among other issues, including the Culture of Just Peace. He was the Head of the Albabtain Foundation for Poetic Creativity.

== Biography ==
Abdulaziz Al-Babtain was born in 1936. He established the Albabtain Central Library for Arabic poetry.

He served at the Ministry of Education in Kuwait as a librarian of Al-Shuwaikh Secondary School, during the period from 1955 until 1962.

In 1974, he established Saud Albabtain Kuwaiti Scholarship for Postgraduate Studies to help poor students continue their education and postgraduate studies in foreign universities. It offers 400 scholarships annually to students from Central Asia, Africa, the Arab world, the Balkan countries, and Europe.

Abdulaziz Albabtain gave special attention to Central Asia. He established the "Prize for Imam Al-Bukhari’s Grandchildren," named after one of the most famous scholars of Hadith (the traditions or sayings of Muhammad).

Abdulaziz Albabtain founded Albabtain Translation Center, aiming to foster the translation movement from other languages to Arabic and vice versa in 2005.

In support of the people of Palestine, he founded Albabtain Kuwaiti Library at the campus of the Faculty of Arts, University of Jerusalem, to provide research facilities to the citizens of Jerusalem and Palestine.

He launched the Albabtain Kuwaiti Award for Arabic Poetry in Palestine for Palestinian poets (under 35 years) from the occupied territories. He also launched training courses developed into Chairs for Arabic Culture in universities worldwide, including:

- Abu Al-Qasim Al-Shabi’s Poetry Chair
  - It was established in cooperation with the Tunisian Presidency and inaugurated at the City of Culture in Tunis in the presence of H.E the President of the Tunisian Republic, Beji Caid Essebsi, the Tunisian Minister of Culture, the members of the Kuwaiti-Tunisian Cooperation Council, ambassadors, intellectuals and poets on 29 June 2018
- Abdulaziz Saud Albabtain Chair for Just Peace at Malta University
  - Abdulaziz Saud Albabtain Cultural Foundation signed an agreement to create this Chair in October 2021 with the Centre for Study and Conflict Resolution of the University of Malta to promote and teach the culture of Just Peace.

Albabtain Institute for Intercultural Dialogue complements Abdulaziz Albabtain’s endeavor to establish a dialogue between European and Arab cultures.

=== Poetry ===
His first collection of poems, named "Bauh Al-Bawadi" (Intimations of the Desert), was published in 1995, while a second collection, named "Musafir fi Al-Qifar" (Wastefarer), was published in 2004. His third collection of poems, "Oghniat AlFeyefi" (The Songs of the Deserts), was published in 2018.

Albabtain Central Library for Arabic Poetry was founded as a gift from Abdulaziz Albabtain to the people of Kuwait and the Arab world on the occasion of selecting Kuwait "Capital of Arab Culture" in 2001.

Abdulaziz Albabtain continued his dreams and ambitions concerning Arabic poetry by establishing Albabtain Center for Authenticating Poetic Manuscripts in 2007.

The Al-Babtain Foundation for Poetic Creativity called in January 2016 for contributions to an Arabic epic on themes of peace, tolerance and love.

Beginning in 2016, Al-Babtain also endowed the Abdulaziz Saud AlBabtain Laudian Professorship in Arabic in the Faculty of Oriental Studies at the University of Oxford. Formerly known as the Laudian Chair of Arabic, it was first endowed in 1636 by Archbishop William Laud and is one of the oldest Chairs of Arabic in Europe.

=== Intercultural Dialogue and the Culture of Just Peace ===
Abdulaziz Albabtain has been leading a process of intercultural dialogue since 2005, and recently he launched a new initiative to advance the Culture of Peace.

On 5 September 2018, Abdulaziz Albabtain addressed the General Assembly of the United Nations following an invitation by the then President of the General Assembly, Miroslav Lajcak, wherein he emphasized the Foundation’s commitment to promoting a culture of just peace that springs from the state of Kuwait’s commitment to supporting peace around the world permanently.

To promote the culture of peace related to the program of action of the UN, Abdulaziz Albabtain was the principal speaker at a side event during the UN High-Level Forum on the Culture of Peace.

Abdulaziz Albabtain Cultural Foundation held the "World Forum for Culture of Peace" entitled "Peace Education for the Protection of Cultural Heritage" on 13 June 2019, at the headquarters of the International Court of Justice - Peace Palace - in The Hague.

Abdulaziz Saud Albabtain Cultural Foundation held the Second World Forum for the Culture of Just Peace, entitled Leadership for Just Peace, in Valletta, the capital of the Republic of Malta, from 3–4 March 2022.

=== Books, Studies, and Academic Theses Studying and Analyzing His Poetry ===
Critical Studies in the collection of poems (Intimations of the Deserts), Studies and criticism written by researchers and critics, compiled and a foreword by Dr. Fawzi Eissa (Egypt), published by Delta Center for Printing, Alexandria 1996. The book includes the following studies and articles;

- A Dialogue with the Text, Dr. Mostafa Nassef (Egypt), pages 43–90
- Intimations of the Deserts, analytical study, Dr. Mohammed Mostafa Hadara (Egypt), pages 91– 106
- Critical issues on Intimations of the Deserts, Dr. Abdul Moneim Khafagui (Egypt), pages 107-122
- The Construction of the Poetic Style in Intimations of the Deserts, Dr. Fawzi Eissa (Egypt), pages 123-142
- The Intimations of the Deserts, reading in the content and the influences, Dr. Ayman Mohammed Maidan, (Egypt), pages 143 -158
- A reading in Intimations of the Deserts, Dr. Nabil Rashad Nofal (Egypt), pages 159 -164
- The Echo of the Poetic Heritage in the collection, Intimations of the Deserts, Khalifa Al-Khayari (Tunisia), pages 165- 176
- Joud Al-Ghawadi fi Bauh Al Bawadi, Dr. Abdul Malek Mortad, (Algeria), pages 177 - 187
- Bauh Al Bawadi (Intimations of the Deserts), Hamoud Al- Begheli (Kuwait), pages 191-192, previously published in Al-Qabas newspaper, Issue No. 8025, Wednesday, 25 January 1995
- Bauh Al Bawadi (Intimations of the Deserts), Nasser Kermani (Kuwait), page 193, previously published in Al-Qabas newspaper, Issue No. 8096, Friday, 5 January 1996
- Reaching the harbors of poetry with a first collection of poems, Faisal Al-Saad (Kuwait), pages 194-199, previously published in Al-Qabas newspaper
- The owner of paralleled personalities, Iqbal Al-Gharballi (Kuwait), pages 200 to 202, previously published in Al-Watan newspaper, Issue No. 7129, 15 December 1995
- The Strays of Poet’s Intimations, pages 203-205, previously published in Al Ahram Newspaper, 6 February 1995
- Intimations of the Deserts, between the romantic flame and the interaction with the masterpieces, Rawda Abdellawi (Tunisia), pages 207- 210, previously published in "Haqa’eq" magazine, Tunisia, Issue No. 518, 6 October 1995
- Intimations of the Deserts, A New Collection of Poems, Hamouda Al-Sharief Karim (Tunisia), pages 211-219, previously published in AlHoreya Newspaper, Tunisia, 19 October 1995
- The Structure of poem in, Intimations of the Deserts, Hamouda AlSharief Karim(Tunisia), pages 221-230, previously published in AlHoreya Newspaper, Tunisia, 26 October 1995

Laayoune Forum for Poetry was prepared by Dr. Louise Boulbers and published by the Ministry of Cultural Affairs, Rabat, in 1997. The book includes the following studies and articles presented during an honoring seminar held for Abdulaziz Albabtain, include:

- Intimations of the Deserts, A Sincere Abundant Passion, Dr. Mohammed Altazi Saud (Morocco), pages 115 - 120
- The time and place in the Intimations of the Deserts, Dr. Mohammed Al-Sarghini (Morocco), pages 121 - 128
- Intimations of the Deserts, A Dialogue with the Text, Dr. Mostafa Nassef (Egypt), pages 129 - 134
- The poeticalness of remembering and retrieval in the Intimations of the Deserts, collection of poems, Dr. Ahmed Altaebiq (Morocco), pages 135- 160.
  - The Memory of Reading/ The Reading of the Memory - A Statistical Sequence/ Contradicting Reading- The Dialectics of Time and Space
- The Semantics of titles in Intimations of the Deserts, AbdelHakim Alsabee’, pages161-171
- Intimations of the Deserts, toward the awakening of the Bedouin urban poem, Dr. Mohammed Al-Danai (Morocco), pages 172-194
- The Rhythmic Structure in the Poetry of Abdulaziz Albabtain, Dr. Mohammed Mostafa Abushwareb (Egypt), pages 195-202

=== Studies on Abdulaziz Albabtain's poetry ===
- The approach of virtuousness in the poetry of Abdulaziz Saud Albabtain, Dr. Yassine Al-Ayoubi (Lebanon) in his book (In the Word’s Shrine: A critical research and study of the modern and contemporary Arabic literature), pages 265-278, published by The Contemporary Library, Beirut 1999
- Interview with Abou-Alkacem Mohamed Kerrou on the Foundation of Albabtain’s Prize for Poetic Creativity, interviewed by Hassan bin Osman and compiled by Abou-Alkacem Mohamed Kerrou (Tunisia) in his book (Interviews and poets) pages 15–20, published by Dar AlMaghreb Al-Arabi, Tunisia 2001

=== The Academic Theses ===
- The Love Poem in Abdulaziz Saud Albabtain Poetry, Postgraduate Thesis - prepared by Khaled Mohammed Al-Mansour under the supervision of Dr. Abdel-Hamid Guida, the Lebanese University, Beirut 1999
- Study and Analysis of the Two Collections of Poems of Albabtain in Persian, Master’s Thesis - prepared by Mokhtar Mojahed (Iran), under supervision of Dr. Mohammed Ali Azersheb, Faculty of Arts- Tehran University 2008
- The Biography in (Wastefarer) Collection of Poems of the Poet Abdulaziz Saud Albabtain (Travelling through Self-gate), Research for postgraduate diploma - end of the second year, prepared by Essam Hajli (Morocco) under supervision of Dr. Omar Marrakshi, The Ministry of National and Higher Education, Rabat 2010

== Positions and Memberships ==
- Chairman of Abdulaziz Saud Albabtain Cultural Foundation
- President of the Scientific Board of Abdulaziz Saud Albabtain Cultural Foundation in the European Union, based in Rome, Italy
- Member of the Kuwait Writers Association
- Member of the Board of Trustees of the Arab Cultural Forum in Beirut
- Correspondent member of the Arabic Language Academy in Damascus
- Member of the Board of Trustees of the Arabian Gulf University in Bahrain
- Member of the Board of Trustees of the College of Arts at the University of Kuwait

== Recognition ==
Abdulaziz Albabtain was awarded 17 honorary doctorates and certificates from universities and academic institutions in recognition of his efforts in the cultural field and humanitarian action, as well as his support of a culture of peace and intercultural dialogue, including:

- The University of Córdoba in 2013 in recognition of his scientific and cultural efforts in Andalusia and its universities. This is the first honorary doctorate to be offered by the University of Cordoba to an Arab figure
- The University of Tehran, the Islamic Republic of Iran, in 2014 in recognition of his cultural efforts. He is the first Arab figure to receive this certificate

Abdulaziz Albabtain was awarded the International Arabic Language Day award at the United Nations headquarters. The award was received on his behalf by the representative of Kuwait to the United Nations Ambassador Mansour Al-Otaibi

== Personal life ==
Al-Babtain died on 15 December 2023, at the age of 87.

== Poetry collections ==
Abdulaziz Al-Babtain published 3 poetry collections, they are listed below:

- He published his first collection of poems, "Bouh Al-Bawadi" in 1995.
- He published his second collection of poems, "A Traveler in the Wastelands" (Arabic: ديوان مسافر في القفار) in 2004.
- He published his third collection of poems, "Songs of Al-Fayafi" in 2017.
