= Hassan Ibrahim Samoun =

Hassan Ibrahim Samoun حسن إبراهيم سمعون
- حسن إبراهيم سمعون
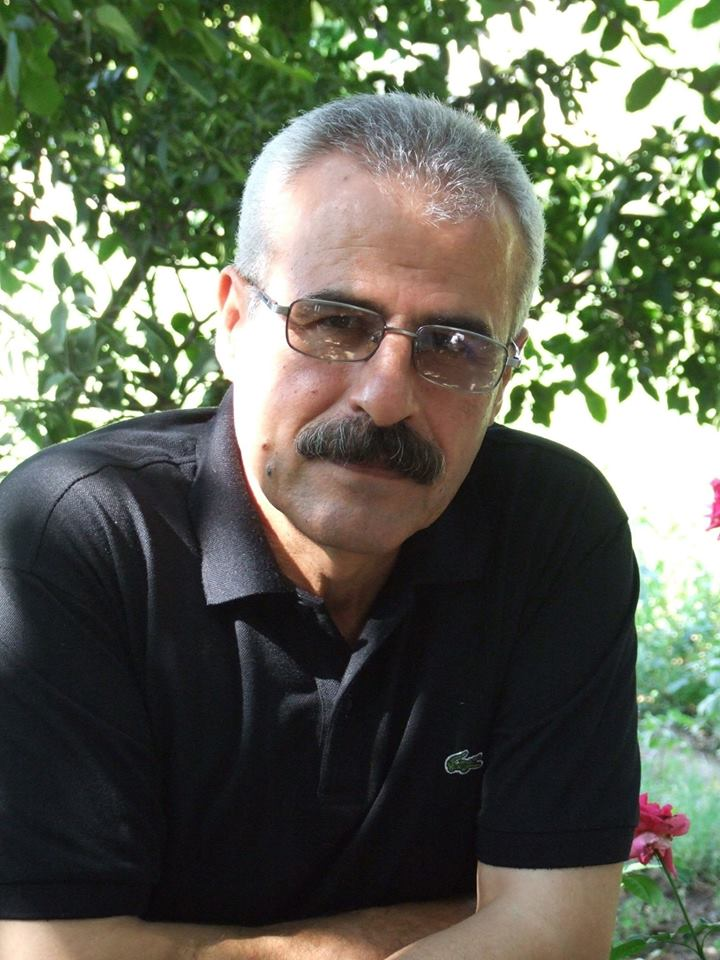
- Born: 1956 (age 69–70); Ayn Alauda, Homs Governorate
- Occupations: poet, writer, publisher

Hassan Ibrahim Samoun (Arabic: حسن إبراهيم سمعون is a Syrian poet and publisher born 1956 in the countryside of Homs. Ibrahim start working in early age in the field of heavy engineering equipment and metal constructions. In 1978 he completed the educational stage in the technical college of motor mechanics, after that he studied Arabic literature at Al-Baath University. His poetic style combines simplicity and elegance in exploring themes of love and Syrian nationalism and Arab nationalism.

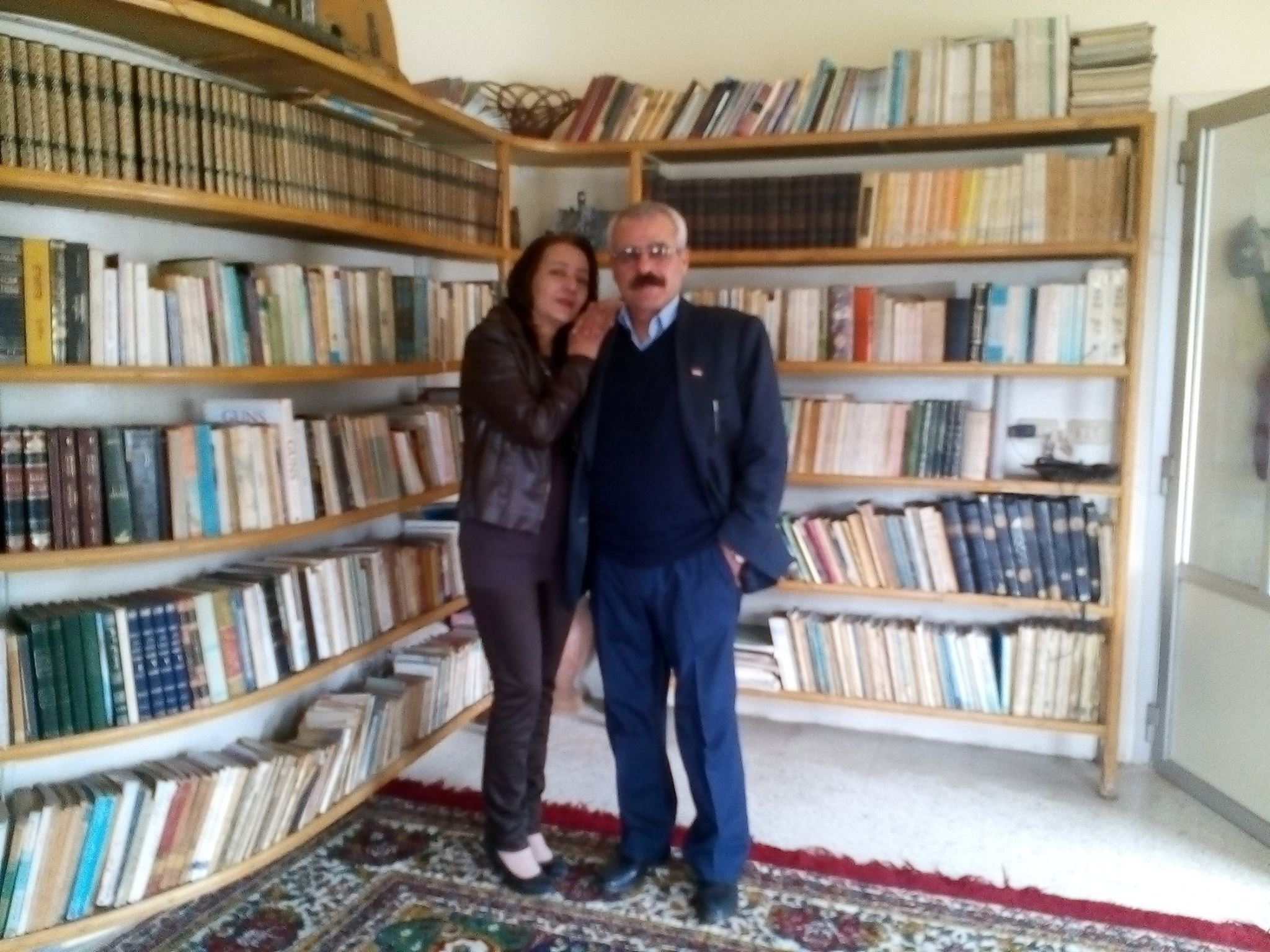
Hassan Samoun with his wife Fatima

== In the theater ==
- The roar (life of a homeland)مسرحية الزئير

== In narration ==
- Microscope المجهر
- Short Stories (Short Stories Collection) مجموعة قصص قصيرة

== Poetry ==
- Signature on the grave-stone إمضاء على الشاهد
- SAtatus of Altaswa'a مقامات التاسوعاء
- Short Images قصار الصور
- Lament the light رثاية النور

== In literature ==
- The Syrian Open Divan الديوان السوري المفتوح
