= Nouzad Ja'adan =

Syrian poet and writer

- Born: May 1984 (age 42); Aleppo, Syria
- Education: Damascus University
- Occupations: Author and poet
- Website: http://nouzadjadan.sha3er.tv/

Nouzad Ja'adan (Arabic: نوزاد جعدان; born May 13, 1984), is a Syrian poet and writer.

He was born in Damascus to a Syrian-Kurdish family living north of Aleppo, and his father is the writer Ja'adan Bakr Ja'adan. He studied media at Damascus University (previously called Syrian University) and graduated in 2008, he currently works as a journalist in Sharjah, United Arab Emirates. He writes in four languages English, Arabic, Urdu, and Kurdish.

== Early life ==
He started writing in 2000; he spends his free time writing poetry, short stories and translating works in languages. Some of those languages include Turkish and Urdu of which he translates into English and Arabic. He does this with the goal of breaking the language barrier and minimizing the gap between cultures.

Ja'adan has written five books: three poetry collections, an anthology of short stories, and an in-depth look at the history of Bollywood in a book titled Founders of the Indian Cinema.

== Works ==
- "The Songs of The Umbrella Salesman" (poem) – Dar Al Farqad, Damascus (2014)
- "Very Happy" (poem) – Dar Nainawa, Damascus (2014)
- Founders of the Indian Cinema, Part l – Al Yasmine Publishing and Distribution, Sharjah (2014)
- Selections of World Poetry – Dar Nabati, United Arab Emirates (2016)
- "Friendly Knives" – Dar Amal El Jadida, Syria (2018)
- Devdas (translation) Dar Amal El Jadida, Syria (2018)
- "Echoes of Wounds" (poem) composed and sung by Syrian Kurdish artist Ahmadi Jabb in Denmark.

== Awards ==
- No'maan Cultural Literary Award for Short Fiction – Lebanon (2008).
- Nominated for the Golden Prize and for the Worldwide Grand Prize of the 6th Art (Poetry) in annual Universal Academy competition – Netherlands 2008.
- Al Noor Centre Award for Creativity for Children’s Literature – Iraq (2009).
- Certificate of appreciation from the Encyclopedia of Arab Poets – Morocco (2009).
- International Poetry and Theatre Competition Castello Di Duino – Italy (2010).
- Art Attack International Poetry Award – Croatia (2010).
- Al-Arabi Award in Collaboration with BBC Radio – Kuwait (2012).
- Khatib Yassin Theatre Awards Shortlist – Algeria (2015).
- Sharjah Award for Arab Creativity, 1st place – United Arab Emirates (2016).
- Al Wasat Short Story Award – Bahrain (2017).
- Rashid Bin Hamad Al Sharqi Awards – United Arab Emirates (2018).
