= Cyrillona =

Cyrillona, also spelled Qurilona (fl. 4th century AD), was an early Syriac poet. He was the younger contemporary of Ephrem the Syrian. It is speculated that he might have been a nephew of Ephrem. He was a contemporary of Balai of Qenneshrin. Gustav Bickell has referred to him as the most important Syriac poet after Ephrem.

Only five of Cyrillona's poems survive, each examined and explained by Griffin, but "On the Grain of Wheat" is of doubtful authenticity. His poem On Zaccheus, is about the invasion of Syria by Huns, is preserved on the manuscript BL Add. 14,591 kept at the British Library.

== Bibliography ==
- Costantino Vona (ed.), I carmi di Cirillona. Studio introduttivo - traduzione - commento, Rome, Desclée & Co., 1963.
- Carl Griffin, Cyrillona. A Critical Study and Commentary, PhD diss., Catholic University of America, 2011.
- Carl Griffin, Cyrillona. A Critical Study and Commentary, Piscataway (NJ), Gorgias, 2016.
- Carl Griffin (ed.),The Works of Cyrillona, Piscataway (NJ), Gorgias, 2016.
