= Abd al-Mu'in Mallouhi =

Syrian poet (1917–2006)

- Born: 1917; Homs, Syria
- Died: 21 March 2006 (aged 88–89)
- Occupations: Writer; journalist; poet
- Writing career
- Pen name: Chronic communist
- Language: Arabic
- Notable works: "Fate and Crime"
- Notable awards: Friendship Order
- Literary movement: Syrian Writers’ Association; Arab Writers Union

Abd al-Mu'in Mallouhi (Arabic: عبد المعين الملوحي; 1917 – 21 March 2006) was a Syrian poet and journalist who wrote under the pen name "chronic communist." He is best known for his poem "Fate and Crime" (Arabic: قدر وجريمة), which was printed but subsequently withdrawn from distribution. The complete version has never been published and the poem is circulated through handwritten copies. The poem is a eulogy to his wife, Buheira, who died of cancer.

== Early life ==
Mallouhi was born in Homs, Syria, in 1917. His first poem was published in 1936. The first book he translated was Fragments from My Diary by Maxim Gorky in 1944. He started working as a teacher in 1945 in Homs, Latakia and Hama.

He was one of the founders of the Syrian Writers’ Association and a member of the Arab Writers Union in Syria. He worked as a director of antiquities at the Ministry of Culture. He also worked as a director of cultural centre and later became a cultural advisor at the Presidential Palace. He retired in 1976. Mallouhi once visited Syrian president Hafez al-Assad, who used to be his student. When asked of his requests, he asked for permission to print a translation of Vietnamese poetry, for which he received the Vietnamese Friendship Order. He received other awards, including one from Bologna. Peking University named him an honorary professor. He was a member of the Arab Academy of Damascus. He wrote many newspaper articles, particularly for Sawt al-Shaab newspaper, which was issued in Damascus. He signed his articles with his name followed by the title "chronic communist."

He died on 21 March 2006.

== Works ==
Abd al-Mu'in Mallouhi wrote many works, including:

- Palms Taste of Hunger (Arabic: طعم النخلة طعم الجوع)
- Snow on a Grave (Arabic: ثلج على قبر)
- "Fate and Crime" (Arabic: قدر وجريمة)
- "Roses" (Arabic: ورود)
- Abd al-Mu'in Mallouhi's Own Obituary (Arabic: عبد المعين الملوحي يرثي نفسه)

His best known work, "Fate and Crime" (Arabic: قدر وجريمة) is a eulogy composed of 186 verses. It was written in 1949 but withdrawn from distribution soon after it was to be printed. It is an elegiac, philosophical and atheistic poem.

He also translated some of the works of Maxim Gorky, Vladimir Lenin, Rasul Gamzatov and Bernard Shaw. He also was the first to translate Fyodor Dostoevsky’s works and Vietnamese poetry to Arabic.

Having started writing poetry at the age of 12, he left behind over 96 printed books and many manuscripts.
