= Raed Wahesh =

Palestinian-Syrian writer, poet and journalist

Raed Wahesh (Arabic: رائد وحش) (born in Damascus in 1981) is a Palestinian-Syrian writer, poet and journalist. He has published four volumes of verse. Wahesh has been supporting the Syrian revolution in his writings.

Wahesh moved in 2013 to Germany, where he was initially a guest in the Heinrich Böll House. He now lives in Hamburg.

== Work ==
Wahesh has worked as a cultural editor for various Arabic-language newspapers and websites. His 2015 prose volume A Missing Piece of Damascus Sky is based on his experiences during the revolution. His most recent texts deal with issues of exile, expulsion and deracination. Wahesh fled Syria in 2013 and came to Germany, where he was initially a guest in the Heinrich Böll House. He lives in Hamburg.

== Publications ==
Publications (poetry):

- Walking We Meet. Walking We Part, Milano 2016
- When the War Did not Happen, Amman 2012
- No One Dreams As Anyone, Damascus 2008
- White Blood, Damascus 2005
- A Missing Piece of Damascus’ Sky, Cairo 2015 (prose)
