= Foundation of Abdulaziz Saud Al-Babtain's Prize for Poetic Creativity =

Arabic language poetry prize

The Foundation of Abdulaziz Saud Al-Babtain's Prize for Poetic Creativity (Arabic: مؤسسة جائزة عبدالعزيز سعود البابطين للإبداع الشعري) is a poetry prize given out by the foundation of Kuwaiti poet and philanthropist Abdulaziz Al-Babtain.

== Overview ==
It was proclaimed in 1989 in Cairo by virtue of an initiative from Abdulaziz Al-Babtain as a private, cultural and non-profit organisation that is exclusively concerned with poetry.

In 2024, the prize has six award categories:

1. The Poetic Creativity Award in Criticism ($40,000 prize)
2. The Best Poetry Collection Award (Best Diwan) ($20,000 prize)
3. The Best Poem Award ($10,000 prize)
4. The Best Poetry Collection Award for Young Poets ($10,000 prize)
5. The Best Poem Award for Young Poets ($5,000 prize)
6. The Honorary Award for Poetic Creativity ($50,000 prize)

== Organisational structure ==
=== Board of trustees ===
The foundation's Board of Trustees comprises the secretary general and at least nine other men of letters, thought and poetry in the Arab world, while trying to represent as many Arab countries as possible. The Board is re-formed every three years. The first Board was formed in the year 1991, the second Board was formed in the year 1994, the third in 1998, and the fourth in 2001. The fifth Board was formed in December 2004.

=== General secretariat ===
The general secretariat is the foundation's executive apparatus. It includes the executive secretariat, computer department, and the research department, which carries out research proof-reading, editing and following up on the publication process, as well as supervising administrative and financial affairs.

The executive apparatus undertakes, in particular, all preparations pertaining to the meetings of the Board of Trustees, the advisory body of the Al-Babtain Encyclopaedia of Arab Poets in the Nineteenth and Twentieth Centuries, the encyclopaedia editing office, the editing office of the Al-Babtain Encyclopaedia of Contemporary Arab Poets in its successive editions, the arbitration committees which coordinate review of the literary works competing for the prizes. It also directs work to the regional offices.

The secretary general is commissioned to represent the foundation in many engagements and missions. The apparatus of the general secretariat undertakes the implementation of the plans and policies drawn up by the Board of Trustees and follows up all the decisions passed by the Board. The first secretary general of the foundation was poet Adnan Al-Shayji, who served from the beginning of the foundation's establishment in 1989 until July 1991. He planned the arbitration and distribution of the first meeting in May, 1990 at the Marriott Hotel in Cairo. This was prior to the establishment of the general secretariat so the foundation relied on significant support from the Cairo-based Modern Literature Association, chaired by Dr. Mohammad Abdulmunem Khafaji. The association has backed the foundation's efforts in executing its functions since its inception. In August 1991, Mr. Abdulaziz Al-Surayea was chosen to be the secretary general of the foundation. At the time, he was occupying the post of Head of Department of Culture and Arts at the National Council for Culture, Arts and Letters from which he resigned in order to assume his responsibilities as full-time secretary general of the foundation as of October 1993.

=== Offices ===
The expansive scope of the foundation's work along with its varied activities all over the Arab world, it required offices to be opened in certain Arab countries, namely:

- Cairo office: covering the region of Egypt, Sudan and neighbouring areas, assisted by delegates in these countries;
- Tunisia office: covering the North African area, assisted by delegates in these countries;
- Kuwait office: covering the Persian Gulf and Arabian Peninsula region. It is run directly by the general secretary as part of the secretariat's work, assisted by the apparatus and delegates from Arab States of the Persian Gulf, in addition to roving delegates from abroad, such as Asia, Europe, Australia, North and South America and Africa.

=== Delegates ===
In addition to its regional offices, the foundation appointed a number of men of letters who are well informed about cultural and poetic affairs in their countries, in order to assist the foundation in executing its project and to meet its needs in their respective countries.

== History ==
=== Sessions ===
First Session
Cairo, 17 May 1990.

For the first meeting, the ceremony for the awarding of prizes was held at the Marriott hotel in Cairo under the auspices of the Egyptian Minister of Culture, Mr. Farouk Hosny. The ceremony was attended by a large number of dignitaries who are interested in poetic, cultural and literary activities. Initially, the value of the main prize was EP 43,000 (Egyptian pounds) but it was doubled during the ceremony to EP 86,000 (Egyptian pounds).

The prizes were awarded as follows:-

- The Poetic Creativity Prize, valued at EP 30,000 (Egyptian pounds), was jointly won by the Kuwaiti poet Mohammed Al-Fayez for his complete poetic works and the Egyptian poet Ibrahim Eisa for his book of verse entitled: Habibi Aneed (My Darling is Stubborn);
- The Poetry Criticism Creativity Prize, valued at EP 30,000 (Egyptian pounds), was jointly won by the Egyptian critic Dr. Mohammed Zaki Al-Ashmawi for his book Literary Criticism Issues and the Egyptian critic Mr. Mustafa Abdullateef Al-Saharti for his book The Contemporary Poetry in Light of Modern Criticism;
- The Excellence in Poetry Prize, valued at EP 20,000 (Egyptian pounds), was won jointly by the Iraqi poet Mohammed Jawad Al-Ghaban for his collection of poems: Inty Ahla (You are Prettier) and the Egyptian poet Khalil Fawaz for his collection of poems: Qalbi (My Heart);
- The Best Poem Prize, valued at EP 6,000 (Egyptian pounds), was won jointly by the Egyptian poet Olayya Al-Jaar for her poem Do not Worry and the Moroccan poet Mohammed Al-Halwi for his poem Fi Rihab Sibta In the Vast Space of Ceuta

Second Session
Cairo, 17 October 1991.

The prizegiving ceremony was held at the Opera House in Cairo under the auspices of the Egyptian Minister of Culture Mr. Farouq Hosni. A large number of poets, writers, critics, as well as members of the press and media attended the ceremony.

The prizes were awarded as follows:

- The Poetic Creativity Prize, valued at EP 60,000 (Egyptian pounds), was won by the Egyptian poet Abdulaleem Al-Qabbani for his complete poetic works;
- The Poetry Criticism Prize, valued at EP 60,000 (Egyptian pounds), was won jointly by the Egyptian critics Dr. Mohammed Fattouh Ahmed and Dr. Mohammed Abdulmottaleb for their complete critical works;
- Classical Poetry Excellence Prize, valued at EP 20,000 (Egyptian pounds), was won jointly by the Egyptian poet Shawki Haikal for his book of verse A Passage to Two Eyes and the Egyptian poet Ismael Oqab for his collection She and the Sea;
- The Excellence in Free Rhyme Poetry Prize, valued at EP 20,000 (Egyptian pounds), was won by the Syrian poet Hassan Attwan for his poetry collection Blood Baptism;
- The Best Poem Prize, valued at EP 20,000 (Egyptian pounds), was won jointly by the Saudi poet Habib Bin Moalla Al-Motairi for his poem With no Title and the Egyptian poet Rabeh Lotfi Juma for his poem Kuwait’s Liberation

The value of the prize in the second session was more than twice that of the first session. The value of the prizes totalled EP 180,000 (Egyptian pounds)

Third Session
Mahmoud Sami Al-Baroudi - Cairo, Egypt, 12–14 December 1992.

The Board of Trustees considered a way to develop the work so that the ceremony was not restricted to awarding prizes. Therefore, the Board decided to dedicate each session to a renowned Arab poet in order to commemorate them and to launch an intellectual seminar about such poets. So, the Board decided to name the third session after the poet Mahmoud Sami Al-Baroudi, the pioneer of Arab poetry revival. The ceremony, in which the prizes were awarded, was held at the Opera House in Cairo, under the auspices of the Egyptian Minister of Culture Mr. Farouq Hosni. A large number of Arab poets and writers attended the ceremony.

Fourth Session
Abu Al-Qassem Al-Shabi – Fes, Morocco, 10–12 October 1994.

The Board of Trustees issued a decision stipulating that the prize shall be awarded during a ceremony held biannually to provide the committees and participating researchers with adequate time to prepare and write their researches and to issue publications about the selected poets of the meetings and their creative work. The Board of Trustees’ decision also highlighted the importance of expanding the circle of important poets so that the chosen poet comes from a country different from that in which the ceremony is being held. As Al-Shabi comes from Tunisia, it was decided that the ceremony was to be held in Morocco in order to show the importance of the Arab Maghreb poets and their poetic prestige in the Arab world. As Fez was the Moroccan cultural capital, it was chosen to host the ceremony, under the auspices of King Hassan II and in the presence of King Mohammed VI, who was then Crown Prince. The ceremony, organised by the foundation in cooperation with Fez Saiss Moroccan Society, was attended by a large number of guests from various Arab countries, which exceeded two hundred poets, critics and personalities interested in Arabic culture.

Fifth Session
Ahmed Mishari Al-Adwani - Abu Dhabi, 28–31 October 1996.

This meeting was named after the prominent Kuwaiti poet Ahmed Mishari Al-Adwani and the capital of the United Arab Emirates, Abu Dhabi was chosen as the host for this ceremonial event, with which the U.A.E. Cultural Society contributed a great deal. The prize awarding ceremony was under the auspices of His Highness Sheikh Zayed ben Sultan Al-Nahyan, President of the U.A.E. A large number of poets, writers and critics from different Arab countries attended the event.

Sixth Session
Al-Akhtal Al-Saghir - Beirut, Lebanon, 14–17 October 1998.

This meeting was held in Beirut under the auspices of Prime Minister Rafiq Al-Hariri. It hosted a large number of poets, writers, critics and others interested in the poetic movement from the Arab world

Seventh Session
Abu Firas Al-Hamdani, Algeria, 31 October–3 November 2000.

This meeting was hosted in the Algerian capital, Algiers to celebrate the two Princes of Poetry; Abu Firas Al-Hamdani or Abu Firas Al-Jamadoma and Abdulqader Al-Jazaeri under the patronage of President Abdulaziz Boutefliqa, in cooperation and coordination with the Algerian Ministry of Communications and Culture and the Writers’ Union. In attendance were a large number of poets, writers and dignitaries interested in the poetic movement of various Arab countries.

Eighth Session
Ali Bin Al-Moqarrab Al-Ayouni, Manama, Bahrain, 1–3 October 2002.

This Session named after the poet Ali Bin Al-Moqarrab Al-Ayouni, who never acquired his entitled appreciation. He was not under the spot lights of the large capitals as he lived in the eastern area of the Arab peninsula in a tumultuous period, which did not receive its due concern. Poet Ibrahim Touqan was chosen as an alternative poet in this session because he expressed the meaning of the Palestinian wounds, the outcry of martyrdom to the ears of the Arab peoples and made poetry a substitute for the rifle. His choice came as a reiteration of the Arab integration with the Palestinian Revolution, which is fighting its fiercest battles. The foundation decided to convene this session in the Kingdom of Bahrain as it witnessed a new era of openness and democracy under the rule of King Hamad Bin Eisa Al-Khalifa. It was under his patronage that the ceremony was inaugurated with the attendance of a large number of poets, critics and cultured personalities from different Arab countries.

Ninth Session
Ibn Zaydoun, Cordoba, Spain, 4–8 October 2004.

The Board of Trustees of the Foundation of Abdulaziz Saud Al-Babtain's Prize for Poetic Creativity approved naming this meeting after the renowned Andalusia poet Ahmed Ibn Zaydoun and decided to hold it in Cordoba, Spain between the 4th and 8 October 2004. This was the first time the foundation held a meeting outside the Arab world and it was aimed at clarifying the true civilization, intellectual and cultural Arab and Muslim image after some opposing parties portrayed a distorted image of them in the wake of the September 2001 attacks. Choosing Cordoba as a host stemmed from the long historical relations between the Arabs and Spain and Portugal (the Iberian Peninsula). All the meeting's activities were carried out under the auspices of King Juan Carlos and his eldest daughter Princess Elena, who attended the opening ceremony. The foundation had invited more than four hundred opinionated leaders, ministers, officials, specialized professors, critics, poets, intellectuals and media men belonging to different religions from the Arab world, Europe and America. On 4 October 2004, the foundation organised a tour of the city of Cordoba for its guests.

Tenth Session
Shawqi and Lamartine - Paris, France, 31 October–3 November 2006.

This session bears the names of the two poets; Ahmed Shawqi - the Prince of Arab poets - and Alphonse de Lamartine - the great French poet. Ahmed Shawqi was chosen because he was a prominent Arab poet and one of the most prolific and diverse. In 1927 the Arab poets chose him unanimously as their Laureate. He was familiar with French culture as he had studied law at Montpellier University and graduated from the Faculty of Law at the University of Paris. He then spent some time in the French capital studying French literature.

Eleventh Session
Al-Babtain's Encyclopaedia of Arab Poets in the Nineteenth and Twentieth Centuries, Kuwait, 27–30 October 2008.

During a meeting held on 25/12/2006, the Board of Trustees decided to base the forthcoming session on one of the foundation's most important projects; Al-Babtain’s Encyclopaedia of Arab Poets in the Nineteenth and Twentieth Centuries. It was set to be held in Kuwait, the country from which this significant piece of work emerged. This publication took 11 years of hard work and team effort to complete and contains biographies of more than eight thousand deceased poets from the years 1801 to 2008. This Encyclopaedia contains biographies and poetic samples of 8,039 poets, in addition to 1479 poets who never received sufficient documentation. Furthermore, this was the first session that took place in Kuwait and was aimed at enriching Kuwait's cultural heritage. On 28 November, 2007, the chairman of the Board of Trustees issued a resolution to form the senior organising committee, under his chairmanship and the membership of a number of specialized persons. The first meeting was held in Kuwait in 2007 and issued the following resolutions: Declaration upon completion of Al-Babtain's Encyclopaedia of Arab Poets in the Nineteenth and Twentieth Centuries and the issuing of its 25 volumes.

Twelfth Session
Khalil Mutran & Mohammad Ali/Mak Dizdar – Sarajevo, Bosnia, 19–21 October 2010.

The twelfth session to be organised and funded entirely by the Foundation of Abdulaziz Saud Al-Babtain's Prize for Poetic Creativity followed in the same vein as the foundation's previous sessions, carrying the names of established poets. This session bore the name of the two late poets, Khalil Mutran (Arabic) and Mohammad Ali/Mak Dizdar (Bosnian) in appreciation for their efforts in serving culture and literature. It also included two symposiums; the first related to culture and inter-faith dialogue, entitled “Dialogue of Civilizations in a Different World Order: Contrast and Harmony” with contributions from four Arabic researchers and four foreign researchers. The second was a literary symposium focusing on the two featured poets with research by 14 Arabic and Bosnian scholars. The cultural activities included evenings of poetry by Arabic poets who were in attendance. There was also a musical ceremony by the Lebanese singer Ghada Shubair, in addition to a Folklore performance from Bosnia and Herzegovina. The session took place under the patronage of President Haris Silajdžić. The events included the participation of hundreds of intellectuals, politicians, men of religion, thinkers and the media from all over the world. Many satellite and television stations covered the session.

=== Forums ===
First Forum
Mohammed Ben Laaboun, Kuwait, 27–30 October 1997.

The Foundation of Abdulaziz Saud Al-Babtain's Prize for Poetic Creativity organised the Mohammed Ben Laaboun Forum in Nabati poetry on 27–30 October 1997 in Kuwait. The Board of Trustees took the decision to organise the meeting with the aim of shedding light on the unknown epoch of this country's history in its social, cultural and political aspects since the area was almost isolated from the outer world. The activities of this meeting started with a visit financed by the foundation's chairman to the Amir Sheikh Jaber Al-Ahmed Al-Sabah at Bayan Palace on Monday 27 October 1997, accompanied by the Amirs, Sheikhs, Poets, and guests of the meeting. The Crown Prince and Prime Minister Sheikh Saad Al-Abdullah Al-Salem Al-Sabah welcomed the visitors and held a breakfast party at Al-Shaab Palace on Thursday 30 October 1997 for the chairman of the Board of Trustees and a number of the foundation's guests.

Second Forum
Saadi Al-Shirazi, Tehran, Shiraz, Iran, 3–5 July 2000.

The chairman of the Board of Trustees decided to form the organising committee of the meeting comprising members from both Arab and Iranian parties. The committee's secretariat general persevered in following up preparations for the venue where the meeting was to be convened. The committee sent delegations to Tehran to be involved in the decision to hold the meeting on 3–5 July, 2000.

Third Forum
Al-Raheel & Al-Milad: Part of the Foundation's Contributions in Celebrating the Choosing of Kuwait as the Capital of Arabic Culture in 2001.

This celebration involved year-round activities.

Fourth Forum
Kuwait's First Forum of Arabic Poetry in Iraq - Kuwait, 7–9 May 2005.

Under the patronage of the Kuwaiti Prime Minister, Sheikh Sabah Al-Ahmed Al-Jaber Al-Sabah (later Amir of Kuwait), the Foundation of Abdulaziz Saud Al-Babtain's Prize for Poetic Creativity organised Kuwait’s First Meeting of Arabic Poetry in Iraq from 7–9 May 2005. The meeting followed a long absence which due to the Iraqi invasion.

Fifth Forum
Mohammad Abdulmunem Khafaji and Adnan Al-Shayji Celebrating the 20th Anniversary of the Foundation of Abdulaziz Saud Al-Babtain's Prize for Poetic Creativity from 1989–2009.
