= Amira Abul Husn =

Syrian poet (born 1959)

Amira Abul Husn (ar: أميرة أبو الحسن; born 1959) is a Syrian poet. She was born in the northern town of Qamishli. She has published several volumes of poetry to date, and is recognized as one of Syria's leading female poets. Her work has appeared in English translation in Banipal magazine.
