= Nazih Abu Afach =

Syrian poet and painter

Nazih Abu Afach (Arabic: نزيه أبو عفش) (born 1946) is a Syrian poet and painter. He was born in western Syria, in the village of Marmarita 60 km from Homs. His first book of poetry came out in 1967, and since then he has published a dozen more collections. He works as an editor for the monthly magazine Al-Mada. His work has appeared in English translation in Banipal magazine.

== Selected works ==
- Al-Wajhu Allathi Laa Yaghriibu (The Face Which Does Not Fade), Homs, 1967
- ‘An Al-Khawfi Wa Al-Tamaathiili (On Fear and Statues), Damascus, 1970
- Hiwaariyat Al-Mawti Wa Al-Nakhiili (Talk of Death and the Palm Tree), Damascus, 1971
- Wishaa’un Min Al-‘Ashbi Li-Umahaati Al-Qatlaa (Blades of Grass for the Mothers of the Killed), Beirut, 1975
- Ayahaa Al-Zamanu Al-Dayyiqu – Ayatuhaa Al-Ardu Al-Waasi’au (Oh Narrow Time, Oh Vast Earth), Damascus, 1978
- Allahu Qariibun Min Qalbi (God Is Near My Heart), Beirut, 1980
- Allaah Yabkii (God Cries), Al-Mada Publishing House, Damascus, 2001
- ‘Ahal At-Taabuut (People of the Coffin), Al-Mada Publishing House, Damascus, 2001
- Indjiil Al-‘A’maa (The Bible of the Blind), Dar Al-Adab, Beirut, 2003
- Al-Dhikrah Al-‘Anaaṣir (Memory of the Elements), Al-Mada Publishing House, Damascus, 2005
- Ar-Raa’ii Al-Hamadjii (The Barbaric Shepherd), 2011
