= Order of Civil Merit of the Syrian Arab Republic =

Order of Civil Merit of the Syrian Arab Republic وسام الاستحقاق المدني
- Type: State decoration with five regular classes
- Awarded for: "Service to the state or to the 'Arab cause'"
- Country: Syria
- Eligibility: Civil Service
- Established: 25 June 1953
- Ribbon

Order of Civil Merit (Arabic: وسام الاستحقاق المدني) (French: Ordre du Mérite civil) is a Syrian decoration. It was established on 25 June 1953. The decoration is awarded for service to the state or to the Arab cause. It has five classes: the Excellent Class, awarded as a badge and star; the First Class, awarded as a badge or star; and the Second, Third, and Fourth Class, awarded as a medal. The Excellent and the First Class are worn on the breast, while the Second Class is worn on a ribbon around the neck. The Third and the Fourth Class are worn on a ribbon on the right side of a chest. The colours of the decoration's ribbon are white-green-white, each represented in equal ratio.

== Notable recipients ==
- Abdul Basit 'Abd us-Samad
- Abdul-Salam Ojeili
- Adib Shishakli
- Alexander Dzasokhov
- Alexander Kinshchak
- Alexei Leonov
- Aram Karamanoukian
- Asad Rustum
- Bashar al-Assad
- Dawoud Rajiha
- Djamila Bouhired
- Dmitry Yazov
- Duraid Lahham
- Georges Catroux
- Gustáv Husák
- Khaled al-Asaad
- Mahmoud Darwish
- Michel Suleiman
- Muhammad al-Maghut
- Muna Wassef
- Nazir Nabaa
- Pavel Belyayev
- Prince Carlo, Duke of Castro
- Ra'ad bin Zeid
- Rafiq Subaie
- Sabah Al-Ahmad Al-Jaber Al-Sabah
- Sabah Fakhri
- Samir Kuntar
- Sattar Alvi
- Sulaiman al-Issa
- Taha Hussein
- V. K. Krishna Menon
- Valentina Tereshkova
- Walid Muallem
