= Mqboola Chalak =

Syrian writer and lawyer

- مقبولة شلق
- Born: 1921; Damascus (Syria)
- Died: 1986 (aged 64–65)
- Known for: writer and lawyer

Mqboola Chalak (1921–1986), Maqbula al-Shalak, sometimes al-Shalaq was a Syrian writer, educator, activist and lawyer.

== Life ==
Mqboola Chalak was born in Damascus in 1921, and studied law at the Damascus University. Judge Hamdi Al-Shalq was her father. In 1944 she became the first woman to graduate with a degree in law from this University, and the fourth woman to graduate from the University. After her graduation, she accompanied her husband to Paris, where she studied the issues of custody, child care and nursery. When she returned to Syria, she founded the Child Protection Society in Damascus.

Chalak is a member of the Arab Writers Union. A native of Damascus, she worked as a teacher, and was a member of the Story and Novel Association. She published a number of books for children as well as a volume of short stories and a volume of verse. Her stories for children include: Stories from my Country and The Wedding of Birds. She has also written children's stories, including: Chicken Adventures, A Poet who has two Diaries: Heart and Lady Songs. She died in 1986.

As an activist she advocated for the United States to take a limited role in the Middle East; she also called for a ban on atomic weapons and spoke out against Adolf Hitler during World War II.
