= List of Egyptians =

The following is a list of some of the notable Egyptians, inside and outside of Egypt.

== Actors ==
=== Male actors ===
- Abdel Moneim Madbouly
- Adel Emam
- Ahmed Zaki
- Ahmed El-Fishawy
- Ahmed El Sakka
- Ahmed El Saadany
- Ahmed Ezz
- Ahmed Helmy
- Ahmed Malek
- Ahmed Mekky
- Ahmed Ramzy
- Ali Mansur
- Amr Waked
- Anwar Wagdy
- Ashraf Abdel Baqi
- Emad Hamdy
- Ezzat Abou Aouf
- Fareed Shawky
- George Sidhom
- Hassan Youssef
- Hussein Fahmy
- Ismail Yaseen
- Kamal El Shennawy
- Kal Naga
- Karim Abdel Aziz
- Karim Mahmoud Abdel Aziz
- Maged el-Kedwany
- Mostafa Amar
- Mena Massoud
- Mohamed Emam
- Mohamed Ramadan
- Nour El-Sherif
- Omar Sharif, Academy Award nominee
- Ramez Galal
- Rami Malek, Academy Award Winner
- Ramy Youssef
- Rushdy Abaza
- Saeed Saleh
- Salah El-Saadany
- Salah Zulfikar
- Samir Ghanem
- Shoukry Sarhan
- Stephan Rosti
- Yehia Chahine
- Youssef El Sherif

=== Actresses ===
- Amena Rizk
- Amina Khalil
- Assia Dagher
- Asmaa Abulyazeid
- Aziza Amir
- Bahiga Hafez
- Bushra
- Donia Samir Ghanem
- Eman El-Asy
- Faten Hamama
- Ghada Adel
- Hana El Zahed
- Hanan Tork
- Hind Rostom
- Huda El-Mufti
- Laila Elwi
- Lebleba
- Leila Mourad
- Lobna Abdel Aziz
- Mariam Fakhr Eddine
- Mary Queeny
- May Calamawy
- May Elghety
- Menna Shalabi
- Mona Zaki
- Naima Akef
- Nermin Al-Fiqy
- Nelly Karim
- Ruby
- Shadia
- Shereen Ahmed
- Sherihan
- Shwikar
- Soad Hosny
- Tara Emad
- Yasmin Abdulaziz
- Yasmin Ali
- Yasmin Raeis
- Yasmine Al Massri
- Yasmine Sabri
- Yosra El Lozy
- Yousra

== Dancers and choreographers ==
- Dina
- Fifi Abdou
- Mahmoud Reda
- Magda Saleh
- Nagwa Fouad
- Nelly Mazloum
- Samia Gamal
- Soheir Zaki
- Taheyya Kariokka
- Zeinat Olwi

== Filmmakers and television directors ==
- Ahmed El-Nahass
- Amr Salama
- André Hakim
- Asaad Kelada
- Ash Atalla
- Assia Dagher
- Atef El Tayeb
- Ayten Amin
- Daoud Abdel Sayed
- Ezz El-Dine Zulficar
- Fadwa El Guindi
- Frank Agrama
- Hala Khalil
- Hassan el-Imam
- Helmy Halim
- Henry Barakat
- Hussein Kamal
- Ibrahim El Batout
- Jehane Noujaim
- Kamla Abou Zekry
- Khairy Beshara
- Khaled Youssef
- Maher Sabry
- Mahmoud Zulfikar
- Marwan Hamed
- Mary Queeny
- Mohamed Diab
- Mohamed Khan
- Mohammed Karim
- Mohamed Said Mahfouz
- Raymond Hakim
- Robert Hakim
- Salah Abu Seif
- Sherif Arafa
- Sam Esmail
- Tamer El Said
- Tamer Shaaban
- Tarek El-Telmissany
- Yousry Nasrallah
- Youssef Chahine

== Theater actors, directors, producers and playwrights ==
- Abdel Moneim Madbouly
- Abo El Seoud El Ebiary
- Alfred Farag
- Naguib Al Rehani
- Sam Esmail
- Tawfiq al-Hakeem

== Film critics ==
- Iris Nazmy
- Samir Farid
- Salwa Bakr
- Tarek El Shennawi

== Radio and television personalities ==
- Ahmed Mussa
- Akmal Saleh
- Ali Faik Zaghloul
- Amr Ellissy
- Bassem Youssef
- Bob Francis (radio)
- Hamdi Qandil
- Hamed Gohar
- Lamis Elhadidy
- Mofeed Fawzy
- Mona El-Saghir
- Mona El-Shazly
- Sarah Khalifa
- Nagui
- Osama Mounir
- Salwa Hegazy
- Shahira Amin
- Tamer Amin
- Youssef Hussein

== Music ==
=== Musicians and composers ===
- Abdu al-Hamuli
- Abu Bakr Khayrat
- Ammar El Sherei
- Amr Diab
- Aziz El-Shawan
- Baligh Hamdi
- Dawood Hussnei
- Gamal Abdel-Rahim
- Halim El-Dabh
- Hasan Rashid
- Kamal Al Taweel
- Kamel al-Khola'ie
- Mohamed Abdelwahab Abdelfattah
- Mohamed El Qasabgi
- Mohammed Abdel Wahab
- Mounir Mourad
- Moustafa Amar
- Omar Khairat
- Rageh Daoud
- Ramzi Yassa
- Riad Al Sunbati
- Rifaat Garrana
- Saleh Abdel Hai
- Sayed Darwish
- Sayed Mekawy
- Sheikh Imam
- Soliman Gamil
- Tarek Ali Hassan
- Yusef Greiss
- Zakaria Ahmed

=== Music directors and conductors ===
- Ratiba El-Hefny
- Nabil Shehata
- Nabila Erian
- Selim Sahab
- Sherif Mohie El Din
- Youssef Elsisi

=== Songwriters ===
- Abo El Seoud El Ebiary
- Abdel Rahman el-Abnudi
- Abdel latif Moubarak

=== Singers and pop stars ===
- Abdel Halim Hafez
- Ahmed Adaweyah
- Amal Maher
- Amira Selim
- Amr Diab
- Angham
- Carmen Suleiman
- Dalida
- Demis Roussos
- Dina El Wedidi
- Ehab Tawfik
- Farid al-Atrash
- Fayza Ahmed
- Haidy Moussa
- Hakim
- Hamada Helal
- Hani Shaker
- Kareem Salama
- Karem Mahmoud
- Laila Mourad
- Lara Scandar
- Mohamed Abdel Wahab
- Mohamed Hamaki
- Mohamed Hassan
- Mohamed Mounir
- Mohammad Fouad
- Mounira El Mahdeya
- Moustafa Amar
- Nesma Mahgoub
- Rami Sabry
- Ruby
- Sandy
- Shaaban Abdel Rahim
- Shadia
- Sherine Wagdy
- Sherine
- Simone Philip Kamel
- Tamer Hosny
- Tony Kaldas
- Umm Kulthum

== Architects, planners and engineers ==
=== Architects ===
- Ali Labib Gabr
- Mahmoud Riad
- Mohamed Kamal Ismail
- Naoum Shebib
- Sayed Karim
- Charles Ayrout

=== Engineers ===
- Mohamed M. Atalla
- Taher Elgamal
- Mootaz Elnozahy
- Hassan K. Khalil
- Yahya El Mashad
- Salah Obaya
- Adel Sedra
- Ahmed Tewfik
- Mona Zaghloul
- Kawthar Zaki

== Arts ==
=== Cartoonists and comic artists ===
- Ahmad Nady
- Ahmed Ragab
- Ahmed Toughan
- Alexander Sarukhan
- George Bahgoury
- Gomaa
- Hussein Bikar
- Mustafa Hussein
- Salah Jahin
- Tarek Shahin

=== Painters ===
- Abdel Hadi Al Gazzar
- Adel Nassief
- Adham Wanly
- Armen Agop
- Chafik Charobim
- Evelyn Ashamallah
- Farouk Hosny
- Fathi Hassan
- Gazbia Sirry
- George Bahgoury
- Georges Hanna Sabbagh
- Ghada Amer
- Hassan Mohamed Hassan
- Hussein Bikar
- Hussein El Gebaly
- Injy Aflatoun
- Isaac Fanous
- Kamal Amin
- Mahmoud Mokhtar
- Margaret Nakhla
- Salah Taher
- Diane Tuckman
- Seif Wanly

=== Sculptors ===
- Adam Henein
- Armen Agop
- Hassan Heshmat
- Mahmoud Mokhtar

== Literature ==
=== Authors ===
- Duaa Abdelrahman
- Intissar Abdulmomen
- Abbass AlAqqad
- Abd Al Rasheed Al Sadiq Mahmmudi
- Abdel Hakim Qasem
- Abdel Wahab el-Miseiri
- Abo El Seoud El Ebiary
- Adel Darwish
- Adel Iskandar
- Ahdaf Soueif
- Ahmed Lutfi el-Sayed
- Ahmed Mourad
- Alaa Al Aswany
- Albert Cossery
- Alfred Farag
- Ayman Zohry
- Bahaa Taher
- Edmond Jabès
- Edwar al-Kharrat
- Ezzat el Kamhawi
- Farag Foda
- Fekry Pasha Abaza
- Gamal al-Banna
- Gamal Al-Ghitani
- Gilbert Sinoué
- Hasan Hanafi
- Ihsan Abdel Quddous
- Iris Habib Elmasry
- Kamal el-Mallakh
- Leila Ahmed
- Louis Awad
- Lutis Abd Al Karim
- Masri Feki
- Mansoura Ez Eldin
- Mo Gawdat
- Mohammad Elsannour
- Mohammad Hassanein Heykal
- Mohammad Moustafa Haddara
- Mostafa Amin
- Mostafa Mahmoud
- Muhammad Aladdin
- Muhammad Husayn Haykal
- Muhammad Sa'id al-'Ashmawi
- Muhammad Jalal Kishk
- Mustafa Lutfi al-Manfaluti
- Nabil Farouk
- Naguib Mahfouz, Nobel Prize in Literature winner
- Nasr Abu Zayd
- Nawal El Saadawi
- Out el Kouloub
- Said El Kemny
- Salama Moussa
- Sonallah Ibrahim
- Taha Hussein
- Tarek Heggy
- Tawfiq al-Hakeem
- Yasser Thabet
- Yehia Hakki
- Yusuf Idris
- Zaki Naguib Mahmoud

=== Historians ===
- Abd al-Rahman al-Jabarti
- Abd al-Rahman al-Rafai
- Ibn Duqmaq
- Shafi' bin Ali el-Masry
- Al-Maqrizi
- Al-Mufaddal
- Al-Sakhawi
- Gawdat Gabra
- George Antonius
- George Elmacin
- Ibn Abd-el-Hakem
- Imam Al-Suyuti
- Iris Habib Elmasry
- John of Nikiû
- Manetho
- Menassa Youhanna
- Raouf Abbas
- Rifa'a el-Tahtawi
- Severus Ibn al-Muqaffa
- Zahi Hawass

=== Poets ===
- Abdel Rahman el-Abnudi
- Abdel Latif Moubarak
- Abdul Rahman Yusuf
- Abduallah El Sharif
- Ahmed Abdel Muti Hijazi
- Ahmed Fouad Negm
- Ahmed Rami
- Ahmed Shawqi
- Ahmed Zaki Abu Shadi
- Hafez Ibrahim
- Ibrahim Nagi
- Iman Mersal
- Mahmoud Sami al-Baroudi
- Mahmud Bayram el-Tunsi
- Mohammad Ibrahim Abu Senna
- Mostafa Saadeq Al-Rafe'ie
- Salah Jahin
- Gaston Zananiri

=== Journalists ===
- Abo El Seoud El Ebiary
- Adel Darwish
- Ahmad Al-Khamisi
- Ahmed Toughan
- Amr Ellissy
- Assaad Taha
- Ayman Mohyeldin
- Ethar El-Katatney
- Ezzat el Kamhawi
- Farag Foda
- Farouk Abdul-Aziz
- Gamal Nkrumah
- Hala El Badry
- Ibrahim al-Mazini
- Ibrahim Hegazi
- Iris Nazmy
- Khalil Mutran
- Mansoura Ez-Eldin
- Mohamed El-Tabii
- Mohamed Hassanein Heikal
- Mohamed Said Mahfouz
- Momtaz Al Ket
- Mona Eltahawy
- Mostafa Amin
- Muhammad Husayn Haykal
- Muhammad Jalal Kishk
- Nawara Negm
- Ola Naguib
- Osama Anwar Okasha
- Rawya Ateya
- Reda Helal
- Rifa'a el-Tahtawi
- Sabah Hamamou
- Safinaz Kazem
- Said Sonbol
- Salama Ahmed Salama
- Shahira Amin
- Tarek Heggy
- Tawfiq al-Hakim
- Wael Abbas
- Yaqub Sanu
- Yasser Abdel Hafez
- Yasser Khalil
- Yasser Thabet
- Yosri Fouda
- Younan Labib Rizk
- Yousef Gamal El-Din
- Zain Abdul Hady

=== Intellectuals ===
- Abdelmegid Moustafa Farrag
- Ahmed Lutfi el-Sayed
- Akram Habib
- Bayoumi Andil
- Magdi Youssef
- Mustafa Mahmoud
- Rifa'a el-Tahtawi
- Salama Moussa
- Tarek Heggy
- Zaki Naguib Mahmoud

== Lawyers ==
- Ahmad Najib al-Hilali
- Ahmed Gamal El-Din Moussa
- Ali Abu el-Fotoh
- Ali Sadek Abou-Heif
- Bahaa El-Din Abu Shoka
- Farouk Sultan
- Khaled Ali
- Mohamed Kamel Leilah
- Stephan Bassily
- Sameh Ashour
- Taher Helmy
- Youssef Darwish

== Business ==
=== 19th — mid-20th Century Feudalists ===
- Abbud Pasha

=== Nationalists (1923 — 1952) ===
- Talaat Pasha Harb

=== Post Infitah (1974 — ) ===
- Ahmed Zayat
- Ahmed Zulfikar
- Dodi Fayed
- Gamal Aziz, also known as Gamal Mohammed Abdelaziz
- Hassan Allam
- Mohamed Al-Fayed
- Naguib Sawiris
- Nassef Sawiris
- Raymond Lakah
- Samih Sawiris
- Tharwat Bassily
- Ahmed El Maghrabi
- Khairat el-Shater
- Mohamed A. El-Erian
- Mohamed Mansour
- Osman Ahmed Osman
- Rachid Mohamed Rachid
- Talaat Moustafa

== Activists ==
- Abdel Wahab El-Messiri
- Abdelrahman ElGendy
- Ahmed Douma
- Ahmed Seif El-Islam
- Ahdaf Soueif
- Alaa Abd El-Fattah
- Dina Zulfikar
- Gamal Eid
- George Isaac
- Hossam Bahgat
- Hossam el-Hamalawy
- Israa Abdel Fattah
- Kamal Khalil
- Kareem Amer
- Khaled Ali
- Laila Soueif
- Mahienour El-Massry
- Maikel Nabil Sanad
- Mohamed Lotfy
- Mona Eltahawy
- Mona Seif
- Nawara Negm
- Nancy Okail
- Rehab Bassam
- Sameh Naguib
- Wael Abbas
- Wael Ghonim
- Wael Khalil
- Nada Thabet
- Yasser Thabet
- Abdelsalam Elkhadrawy

== Government ==
=== Presidents ===
- Abdel Fattah el-Sisi
- Adly Mansour
- Muhammad Anwar el-Sadat
- Gamal Abdel Nasser
- Muhammad Hosni Mubarak
- Mohamed Morsi
- Muhammad Naguib
- Sufi Abu Taleb

=== Prime Ministers of Egypt ===
- Mostafa Madbouly
- Ibrahim Mahlab
- Sherif Ismail
- Kamal Ganzouri
- Essam Sharaf
- Ahmed Shafik
- Ahmed Nazif
- Atef Ebeid

=== Diplomats ===
- Abdel Hamid Badawi
- Abdul Rahman Hassan Azzam
- Ahmed Aboul Gheit
- Ahmed Asmat Abdel-Meguid
- Ahmed Maher
- al-Aswani
- Ali Maher
- Amr Moussa
- Ashraf Ghorbal
- Aziz Ezzat Pasha
- Boutros Boutros Ghali
- Fathi Saleh
- F. D. Amr Bey
- Helmy Bahgat Badawi
- Ihab el-Sherif
- Ismail Chirine
- Jean-Sélim Kanaan
- Kamil Abdul Rahim
- Maged A. Abdelaziz
- Mahmoud Riad
- Mohammed Bassiouni
- Mohamed ElBaradei
- Mohamed Hafez Ismail
- Mohammed Hassan El-Zayyat
- Mohammed Murad Ghaleb
- Muhammad Ibrahim Kamel
- Muhammad Shaaban
- Nabil Fahmi
- Nadia Younes
- Omar Sharaf
- Ramzy Ezzeldin Ramzy
- Sameh Shoukry
- Tahseen Bashir

=== Caliphs ===
- al-Adid
- Al-Amir
- Al-Faiz
- Al-Hafiz
- Al-Hakim bi-Amr Allah
- Al-Musta'li
- Al-Zafir
- Ali az-Zahir
- al-Mustansir

=== Monarchs ===
- Menes - first Pharoanic King to unite Egypt
- Khufu
- Ramesses II
- Tutankhamun
- Akhenaten
- Amenhotep III
- Thutmose I
- Thutmose II
- Thutmose IV
- Abbas I
- Abbas Hilmi Pasha
- Al-Kamil
- Al-Nasir Muhammad
- Muhammad ibn Ali al-Khalanji
- Cleopatra VII
- Farouk of Egypt
- Fuad I of Egypt
- Fuad II of Egypt
- Hatshepsut
- Ibrahim Pasha of Egypt
- Muhammad Ali of Egypt

=== Grand viziers ===
- Bahaa el-Din bin Hanna
- Ibn bint al-A'azz
- Isa ibn Nasturus ibn Surus
- Ridwan ibn Walakhshi
- Shawar

=== Queens of Egypt ===
- Farida of Egypt
- Hatshepsut
- Narriman Sadek
- Nazli Sabri
- Nefertiti
- Queen Karomama
- Shajar al-Durr
- Sitt al-Mulk
- Hoshiyar Qadin

=== Politicians ===
- Abaza Family
- Abdel-Moneim Imam
- Abdul Rahman Hassan Azzam
- Ahmad Esmat Abdel Meguid
- Ahmad Fathi Sorour
- Ahmad Mahir Pasha
- Ahmad Najib al-Hilali
- Ahmed Aboul Gheit
- Ahmed Lutfi el-Sayed
- Ahmed Nazif
- Ahmed Shafiq
- Ahmed Urabi
- Ahmed Medhat Yeghen Pasha
- Ali Pasha Mubarak
- Amr Moussa
- Abdel Rahim Sabri Pasha
- Atef Ebeid
- Ayman Nour
- Bahey El Din Barakat Pasha
- Boutros Boutros Ghali
- Boutros Ghali
- El-Emam family
- Fouad Serageddin
- Heshmat Fahmi
- Hussein Sabri Pasha
- Hussein Al Shafei
- Ismail al-Din
- Isma'il Sidqi
- Joseph de Picciotto Bey
- Kamal Ramzi Stino
- Mahmoud Esmat
- Mahmoud Ezzat
- Makram Ebeid
- Mohamed AlBaradei
- Mohamed Anwar Esmat Sadat
- Mohammad Farid
- Mokhtar Khattab
- Mostafa Elwi Saif
- Muhammad Mahmoud Pasha
- Mustafa Kamil Pasha
- Mustafa an-Nahhas Pasha
- Numan Gumaa
- Rafik Habib
- Saad Zaghloul
- Stephan Bassily
- Wafik Moustafa
- Youssef Darwish
- Zakaria Mohieddin
- Zulfikar family

== Scholars ==
=== Egyptologists ===
- Abdul Latif al-Baghdadi
- Ahmad Fakhri
- Ahmed Kamal
- Alexander Badawy
- Aziz Suryal Atiya
- Dhul-Nun al-Misri
- Kamal el-Mallakh
- Labib Habachi
- Mahmoud Maher Taha
- Naguib Kanawati
- Pahor Labib
- Selim Hassan
- Zahi Hawass

=== Explorers ===
- Ahmed Hassanein
- Hannu
- Ibn Selim el-Aswani
- Nehsi

=== Mathematicians ===
- Mohamed M. Atalla
- Alaa A. Abdel Bary
- Hanan Mohamed Abdelrahman
- Elsayed M. Abo-Dahab
- Attia Ashour
- Caleb Gattegno
- Ali S. Hadi
- Alfaisal A. Hasan
- Ibn al-Majdi
- Michael Hasofer
- Mourad Ismail
- Khaleed S. Mekheimer
- Ali Moustafa Mosharafa
- Al-Qalqashandi
- Roshdi Rashed
- Samir Saker
- Shoukry Hassan Sayed
- Obada Abdel Shafy
- Laila Soueif
- Nasser Sweilam

=== Philosophers and Legal Scholars ===
- Abd Al Rasheed Al Sadiq Mahmmudi
- Abd El-Razzak El-Sanhuri
- Abdel Rahman Badawi
- Abdel Wahab Elmessiri
- Arnouphis
- Hassan Hanafi
- Ihab Hassan
- Mustafa Mahmoud
- Plotinus
- Rifa'a el-Tahtawi
- Zaki Naguib Mahmoud

=== Scientists ===
- Abbas El Gamal
- Abū Kāmil Shujāʿ ibn Aslam
- Ahmad al-Qalqashandi
- Ahmad ibn Yusuf
- Ahmed Zewail
- Al-Kum al-Rishi
- Ahmes
- Caleb Gattegno
- Ctesibius
- Diophantus
- Djer
- Elsayed Elsayed Wagih
- Eman Ghoneim
- Euclid
- Farouk El-Baz
- Farkhonda Hassan
- Gamal Hemdan
- Hamed Gohar
- Hero of Alexandria
- Hypatia of Alexandria
- Ibn al-Majdi
- Ibn Yunus
- Imhotep
- Mahmoud El Manhaly
- Mohamed Atalla
- Mostafa El-Sayed
- Moustafa Mousharafa
- Nabil Hegazi
- Ptolemy
- Rana el Kaliouby
- Rashad Khalifa
- Reda R. Mankbadi
- Riad Higazy
- Rushdi Said
- Sameera Moussa
- Sharif Basyouni
- Taher ElGamal
- Tarek Ali Hassan
- Theon of Alexandria
- Wafik El-Deiry
- Yehia El-Mashad
- Zakariyya al-Ansari
- Zosimos of Panopolis

=== Physicians and surgeons ===
- Ahmed Shafik
- Ali ibn Ridwan
- Da'ud Abu al-Fadl
- Emin Pasha
- Eutychius of Alexandria
- Gorgi Sobhi
- Hilana Sedarous
- Ibrahim Nagi
- Imhotep
- Isaac Israeli ben Solomon
- Magdi Yacoub
- Magdy Ishak
- Mohammed Aboul-Fotouh Hassab
- Mustafa Mahmoud
- Muhammed Taher Pasha
- Naguib Pasha Mahfouz
- Nagy Habib
- Nawal El Saadawi
- Paul Ghalioungui
- Samy Azer
- Tarek Ali Hassan
- Yahya of Antioch
- Yasser Elbatrawy

== Pioneering women ==
- Cleopatra the Alchemist
- Sameera Moussa
- Doria Shafik
- Mowafaqia al-Masria
- Nashwan bint al-Gamal
- Hikmat Abu Zayd
- Ester Fanous
- Farkhonda Hassan
- Hoda Sharawy
- Jihan Sadat
- Lotfia ElNadi
- Pamphile of Epidaurus
- Safeya Zaghloul
- Mona Zulficar
- Maya Morsy
- Rania Al-Mashat
- Amani Al Tawil

== Religion ==
=== Prophets ===
- Moses
- Joseph
- Aaron
- Amram

=== Saints ===
- Abdel Messih El-Makari
- Abraam Bishop of Fayoum
- Anianus of Alexandria
- Anthony the Great
- Athanasius of Alexandria
- Catherine of Alexandria
- Cyril of Alexandria
- Cyrus and John
- Demiana
- Dioscorus of Alexandria
- Dorothea
- Euphrosyne of Alexandria
- Felix and Regula
- Hilarion
- Hyacinth and Protus
- John the Short
- Macarius of Alexandria
- Macarius of Egypt
- Mar Awgin
- Mary of Egypt
- Moses the Black
- Saint Nilus
- Onuphrius
- Pakhom
- Parsoma
- Paul of Tammah
- Paul the Simple
- Pavly the Anchorite
- Pishoy
- Pope Abraham of Alexandria
- Alexander of Alexandria
- Cyril VI
- Demetrius of Alexandria
- Pope Matthew I of Alexandria
- Peter of Alexandria
- Saint Amun
- Saint Apollonia
- Saint Maurice
- Saint Menas
- St. Nilammon
- Saint Pambo
- Saint Sarah
- Saint Shenouda the Archimandrite
- Saints Chrysanthus and Daria
- Samuel the Confessor
- Serapion Bishop of Thmuis
- Simon the Tanner
- Verena

=== Preachers ===
- Abadiu of Antinoe
- Abassad
- Abd al-Hamid Kishk
- Abdel-Halim Mahmoud
- Abraam, Bishop of Faiyum
- Abu Uday el-Masry bin el-Emam
- El-Mohib bin el-Emam
- Ahmed Shaker
- Amr Khaled
- Anba Mikhail
- Athanasius, Metropolitan of Beni Suef
- Bishop Angaelos
- Habib Girgis
- Hassan Al-Banna
- John of Nikiû
- Matta El Meskeen
- Meletius of Lycopolis
- Menassa Youhanna
- Muhammad Abduh
- Muhammad Hussein Yacoub
- Muhammad Metwally Al Shaarawy
- Muhammad Sayyid Tantawi
- Origen of Alexandria
- Pope Cyril VI
- Pope Shenouda III of Alexandria
- Saint Paphnutius the Bishop
- Sayyed Qutb
- Bishop Serapion
- Severus Ibn al-Muqaffa
- Yusuf Al-Qaradawi

== Sports personalities ==
=== Athletes ===
- Ahmed Mohamed Ashoush
- Alaa Abdelnaby
- Dionysios Kasdaglis
- Hanan Ahmed Khaled
- Hassan Ahmed Hamad
- Hatem Mersal
- Hisham Greiss
- Khadr El Touni
- Mohamed Naguib Hamed
- Nagui Asaad
- Mohamed Salah
- Michael Hage
- Omar Marmoush

=== Basketball players ===
- Zaki Harari (born 1936), Olympic basketball player
- Abdel Nader, basketball player

=== Fencers ===
- Alaaeldin Abouelkassem (born 1990), fencer, Olympic medalist
- Salvator Cicurel (1893–1975), Olympic fencer and Jewish community leader
- Mauro Hamza (born 1965 or 1966), fencing coach
- Saul Moyal, Olympic fencer

=== Soccer & handball players ===
- Abdel-Karim Sakr
- Abdulrahman Fawzi
- Ahmed El-Ahmar
- Ahmed Fathi
- Ahmed Hassan
- Ahmed Hegazi
- Ali Khalil
- Ali Riadh
- Amr Zaki
- Emad Moteab
- Essam Baheeg
- Essam El Hadary
- Farouk Gaafar
- Gamal Abdel-Hamid
- Gamal Hamza
- Hamada Emam
- Hanafy Bastan
- Hany Ramzy
- Hassan Shehata
- Hazem Emam
- Helmy Zamora
- Hossam Ghaly
- Hossam Hassan
- Hussein El-Sayed
- Hussein Hegazi
- Hussein Labib
- Hussein Zaky
- Ibrahim Youssef
- Karim Handawy
- Mahmoud El-Gohary
- Mahmoud El-Khateeb
- Mahmoud Mokhtar El Tetsh
- Mahmoud Trezeguet
- Mido
- Mohamed Aboutreika
- Mohamed Elneny
- Mohamed Latif
- Mohamed Salah
- Mohamed Zidan
- Mostafa Taha
- Mostafa Ziko
- Omar Marmoush
- Saleh Seleem
- Shikabala
- Taha Basry
- Taher Abouzaid
- Tewfik Abdullah
- Yehia Emam

=== Tennis players ===
- Issam Haitham Taweel
- Ibrahim Hamadtou
- Karim Maamoun
- Mayar Sherif
- Sandra Samir

=== Wrestlers ===
- Kamal Ibrahim
- Karam Gaber
- Mohamed Abdelfatah

=== Other sports ===
- Ramy Ashour, squash player
- Lamia Bahnasawy, archer
- Ahmed Barada, squash player
- Ismail Essam archer
- Mamdouh Elssbiay body builder
- Magdy Gheriani, gymnast
- Ahmed Hassanein, american football player
- Abla Khairy, swimmer
- Ōsunaarashi Kintarō, sumo wrestler
- Esmat Mansour weight lifting
- Mahmoud Mersal boxer
- Amr Shabana, squash player
- Sam Soliman, boxer
- Lucy Rokach poker player
- Abdelrahman Sameh, swimmer
- Mark Seif, poker player
- Rami Serry, racing driver
- Nasser El Sonbaty body builder
- Hossam Youssef, volleyball player

== Prominent and Revolutionary Leaders of Egypt ==
- Abaskiron
- Abd El Aziz Muhammad Hejazi
- Abdel Fattah Yahya Ibrahim Pasha
- Abdel Khaliq Sarwat Pasha
- Adli Yakan Pasha
- Ahmad Fuad Mohieddin
- Ahmad Mahir Pasha
- Ahmad Ziwar Pasha
- Ahmed Nazif
- Ankhwennefer
- Ali Lutfi Mahmud
- Ali Mahir Pasha
- Ali Sabri
- Anwar El Sadat
- Atef Ebeid
- Atef Sedki
- Aziz Sedki
- Boutros Ghali
- Essam Sharaf
- Gamal Abdel Nasser
- Harsiesi
- Hassan Sabry Pasha
- Horwennefer
- Hosni Mubarak
- Hussein Rushdi Pasha
- Hussein Sirri Pasha
- Inaros I
- Inaros II
- Isidorus
- Isma'il Pasha
- Kamal Ganzouri
- Kamal Hassan Ali
- Kamose
- Khabash
- Mahmoud Fawzi
- Mahmoud Sami el-Baroudi
- Mahmoud an-Nukrashi Pasha
- Mamdouh Salem
- Muhammad Mahmoud Pasha
- Muhammad Naguib
- Muhammad Said Pasha
- Muhammad Sharif Pasha
- Muhammad Tawfiq Nasim Pasha
- Mustafa Khalil
- Mustafa el-Nahhas
- Nubar Pasha
- Raghib Pasha
- Riyad Pasha
- Saad Zaghloul
- Tewfik Pasha
- Umar Makram
- Youssef Wahba
- Zakaria Mohieddin

== Military leaders ==
- Abd-Al-Minaam Khaleel
- Abdel Fattah El-Sisi
- Abdel Ghani el-Gamasy
- Abdel Hakim Amer
- Abdel Wahid bin Yazid el-Iskandarani
- Abdul Munim Riad
- Abdul Munim Wassel
- Alaa el-Din bin el-Emam
- Ahmad Pasha al-Munkali
- Abu Zikry
- Ahmad Ismail Ali
- Ahmed Ali al-Mwawi
- Anwar El Sadat
- Atef Sadat
- Anwar El Sadat
- Domiyat
- Fakhr al-Din al-Qibti
- Fakhr al-Din ibn al-Shaykh
- Hussein Refki Pasha
- Ibrahim bin Shaddad
- Ibn bint al-A'azz
- Ibn bint al-Aqsarayi
- Ibrahim Pasha
- Iftikhar al-Dawla
- Isma'il Pasha Abu Jabal
- Izz al-Din al-Kawrani
- Kamal Hassan Ali
- Magdy Galal Sharawi
- Mahammad Rustum Bey
- Mahmoud el-Sisi
- Mahmoud Abdel Rahman Fahmy
- Mahmoud Fehmy
- Mahmoud Kabil
- Mohammed Aly Fahmy
- Mohammed Haidar Pasha
- Murad Bey
- Osama El-Gendy
- Qutuz
- Rashad Mehanna
- Reda Seireg
- Saad al-Din bin Ghurab
- Saad El Shazly
- Selim Fathi Pasha
- Siraj al-Din Dhabyan
- Shafi' bin Ali el-Masry
- Shawar
- Suleiman Khater
- Youssef Sabri Abu Taleb
- Zayn al-Din Ahmad bin Hanna
- Zakaria Mohieddin

== Celebrity chefs ==
- Christopher Maher
- Karine Bakhoum
- Michael Mina
- Essam Sayed

== See also ==
- List of ancient Egyptians
