= Picciotto =

Picciotto is a surname. Notable people with the surname include:

- Concepción Picciotto (1936–2016), Spanish-American peace activist
- Cyril Moses Picciotto (1888–1940), British barrister, writer and politician
- Danielle de Picciotto, American-born artist, musician and film maker in Germany
- Edgar de Picciotto, Swiss banker
- Guy Picciotto (born 1965), American singer, songwriter, guitarist, musician, and producer
- Irva Hertz-Picciotto (born 1948), American environmental epidemiologist
- Marina Picciotto (born 1963), Yale professor and American neuroscientist
- Joseph de Picciotto Bey (1872–1938), Egyptian politician and economist
- Sol Picciotto (born 1942), British legal scholar

== Other uses ==
- Picciotto (Mafia), a rank of Mafia associate
- Mount Picciotto, a mountain in Antarctica
