= Zouba El-Klobatiyya =

Egyptian belly dancer and actress

- زوبة الكلوباتية
- Born: Zainab Hussein Mustafa; 22 February 1915; Al-Darb al-Ahmar, Egypt
- Died: 20 September 1972 (aged 55); Cairo, Egypt
- Occupations: Actress and dancer
- Years active: 1935–1998

Zouba El-Klobatiyya (Arabic: زوبة الكلوباتية)(1917–1972) is an Egyptian dancer and actress.

== Early life ==
Zainab Hussein Mustafa 'was born in the neighborhood of Al-Darb al-Ahmar in Cairo in 1917, known as "Zuba Al-Kawalbati".

== Career ==
She was the most famous dancer in Egypt of her time, especially in Muhammad Ali Street Downtown Cairo, specifically in the 1930s. It is said that her fame reached the point that her statues were replaced by empty bottles. Dancing retired on the pretext that it was forbidden and headed to the Hajj, She married at age 13 to Klopati. He watched at the joys to perform the courtesy, but he was returning to the house at dawn and with him the dancer who was in joy, and when Zuba intercepted, he was brought to her a marriage voucher or a customary contract, then he released her after days Dancers for their experience, so Zubba decided to learn to dance and sing until her husband dispensed with the dancers, and she went to a dance house claiming `` Khadija Al-Wansh to learn to dance and sing, and she was dancing and singing to her husband, but when he learned that she learned to her divorce, that was an opportunity to start her life in art, accompanied by Khadija Al-Wansh To become a dancer Zuba and she was 60 piasters in addition to the point reaches six pounds, and she was not satisfied with dance, but she sang, and after her success she married Zuba from the singer Mohamed Al-Sagheer, and composed to her senior composers such as Kamel al-Khola'ie and Ahmed Sabri and Mohamed Al-Kahlawi, and her marriage did not last for the young, and then married the musician and composer Abdel Moneim Al -Abyari.

=== Al Shamadan dance ===
Zuba was the first dancer to ever dance with a large candelabra or shamadan. According to an interview with journalist Youssef Al -Sharif she saw a man named Hussain Fouad who danced with the candle in the Ezz Al -Din hall and decided to imitate the dance. Although the candlestick weighed 10 kilograms, she danced without shaking the candle flame. Zuba to the Zuba Al -Kawalbati's play written by Salah Tantawi and co -starred with singer Raja Abdo.

=== Film ===
Zuba appeared in the movies Five Pay and Circus Girl, and in a German movie on oriental dance. She reached fame using the name "Zuba Zubba, Zubba, Zubba, Zubba, Zubba, statues of Zubba". The reason for creating a statue of Zuba was the writer and artist Abdul Rahman Al -Khamisi.

== See also ==
- Women in dance
