= Tarek Heggy =

Egyptian author

- طارق حجى
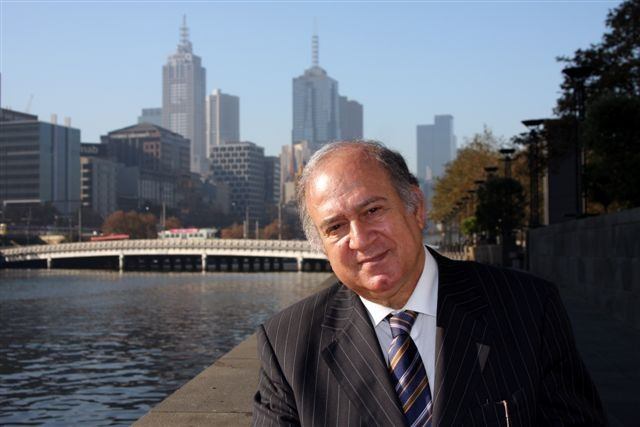
- Born: October 12, 1950 (age 75); Port Said, Kingdom of Egypt
- Education: Ain Shams University; University of Geneva
- Occupations: Writer, intellectual, international petroleum strategist
- Website: http://www.tarek-heggy.com

Tarek Heggy (Arabic: طارق حجى, IPA: [ˈtˤɑːɾˤeʔ ˈħeɡɡi]; born October 12, 1950) is an Egyptian liberal author, political thinker and international petroleum strategist. Heggy is one of Egypt’s more prominent authors on the subject of Egypt’s need for political reform. His extensive writings advocate the values of modernity, democracy, tolerance, and women's rights in the Middle East – advancing them as universal values essential to the region's progress. He has lectured at universities throughout the world and various international institutions and think tanks, including The Heritage Foundation, the Carnegie Endowment for International Peace, and the Council on Foreign Relations.

Heggy's main themes are the need for economic, political, cultural and educational reforms in Egypt and the Middle East. He emphasizes respect for individual rights and the power of human reason to drive the sciences forward. He is an advocate of creativity and the arts, gender equality, free markets, non-sectarian public administration, and the utilization of modern management techniques.

Tarek Heggy’s two books (published just before the Arab Spring), The Arab Cocoon (2010) and The Arab Mind Bound (2011), examine if and why the Arab world is resistant to Western forms of progress. Heggy puts forth that it is Arab culture, broadly construed, that is holding the region back. He believes that neither U.S. foreign policy nor the existence of Israel are the primary reasons for this. Nor does he believe European colonialism, the global capitalist system, or the league of autocratic rulers who clung (and in places, continue to cling) to power thanks to oil revenues or outside military aid are the causes. Heggy draws on his cosmopolitan background, business experience, and discussions with public intellectuals of every persuasion to critique Arab culture.

The mindset Heggy describes is prone to a literal, politicized version of Islam, which is a major contributor to the Arab malaise. The core of Heggy’s most important contention is encapsulated by this metaphor in The Arab Mind Bound: Arab culture is “shackled with two heavy chains”: attached to one is the species of Islam promulgated by Saudi Wahhabis and to a lesser extent, the Muslim Brotherhood; attached to the other is a dysfunctional educational system that perpetuates the “defective thought processes, intellectual distortions and negative delusions” that yield endemic stagnation in every sphere. It follows that no attempt to address the myriad political and economic problems facing the Arab-Islamic world will be successful without religious, cultural, and educational reforms.

According to Bernard Lewis, a Cleveland E. Dodge Professor Emeritus of Near Eastern Studies at Princeton University, Heggy is a "courageous and distinctive voice from Egypt" and provides "a candid and provocative inside view of the current problems of the Arab world." Heggy has participated in the BBC/Doha Debate on the Separation of Mosque and State.

== Early life and education ==
Heggy studied law (LL.B & LL.M) at Ain Shams University in Cairo, followed by higher degrees in Modern Management Techniques from the International Management Institute of Geneva University. From 1973 till 1979 he was associate professor of Law at Constantine University/Algeria and the University of Fes/Morocco.

== Career ==
In July 1979, Heggy joined a major gas and oil company as an attorney (1979–1985) and went on to become deputy to the Chairman of its Egypt branch (1985–1988). In 1988 he became its Chairman and CEO, from which he resigned on July 1, 1996.

Heggy participated in establishing (in 2000) the "Chair of Coptic Studies" at the American University in Cairo as well as the Tarek Heggy Graduate Scholarship for Jewish-Muslim Relations at the University of Toronto.

Heggy received the 2008 Grinzane Cavour Award for cultural and literary achievement as well as the Tenth Anniversary Award Recipients/Arab World Books' Writers.

== Bibliography ==
Since April 1978, Tarek Heggy has written 20 books In Arabic (plus 16 in English, French, Italian & Hebrew).

Books in English:

- On Management and Petroleum Industry. 1991
- Egypt's Contemporary Problems. 1992
- Critique of Marxism. 1992
- Egyptian Political Essays. 2000
- Culture, Civilization & Humanity. (Published in the UK and US by Frank Cass) 2003
- The Fall of Socialism. 2009
- The Arab Cocoon. (Published by Vallentine Mitchell in the UK, US) 2010
- The Arab Mind Bound. (Valentine Mitchell Publishers, UK and US) 2011
- Islamism and Modernity: an Unconventional Perspective. (FEEM press publisher, editor Guilio Sapelli). 2014
- The Plague of Radicalism. (Roznameh Publisher) 2016

Books in Arabic:

- Moroccan Criminal Law. 1978
- Marxist Ideas In Balance. 1978
- Communism And Religion. 1980
- My Experience With Marxism. 1983
- What is to be done? 1986
- The Four Idols. 1988
- The Trinity of Destruction. 1990
- Egypt between two Earthquakes. 1991
- The Fateful Transformation. 1993
- Reflections on Egypt 's Realities. 1995
- Critique of the Arab Mind. 1998
- Culture First and Foremost. 2000
- The Values of Progress. 2001
- On the Egyptian Mind. 2003
- Margins on The Egyptian Mind. 2004
- Modern Management in the contemporary Arab Societies. 2006
- The Prisons of the Arab Mind. (Merit Publishers, Cairo) 2009
- Our Culture Between Illusion and Reality. 2009
- DANAT. (Dar al Horryiah Publisher, Cairo) 2012
- The Plague of Radicalism (Akhbar-el-Youm publisher) 2019

Books in French:

- L'inéluctable Transformation. 1991
- Le Djinn Radical. (Published by L'Harmattan, Paris) 2010
- L'esprit Arabe Enchaîné (Published by L'Harmattan. Paris) 2012
- Peste du Radicalisme (Édition Roznameh) 2016

Books in Italian:

- Le Prigioni Della Mente Araba (translated by Valentina Columbo). (Published by Marietti 1820 - Casa Editrice Marietti, Milan Italy) 2010

Books in Hebrew:

- Arab Enlightenment and its Challenges - Liberal Thought in Egypt (translated from Arabic: Dr. Yona Sheffer). (Published by REISLING Publishing, Tel Aviv) 2024

== See also ==
- Lists of Egyptians
