= Ahmed Ragab (satirist) =

Egyptian satirist

Ahmad Ragab (1928–12 September 2014) was an Egyptian actor who wrote for the newspaper Al-Akhbar. Ragab was known by writing "Nos Kelma" ("Half a Word"), usually a few lines of satire. He is sometimes considered a national institution.

In 1974, Ragab began working with cartoonist Mustafa Hussein to provide ideas and captions for the newspaper's cartoon on its last page, but they had a falling out in 2001.

The Anti-Defamation League criticized Ragab for a 2001 Al-Akhbar column called "Thanks to Hitler", in which he thanked the Nazi leader for the persecution of Jews and wrote "revenge on them was not enough."
