= Alfaisal A. Hasan =

Egyptian professor of Engineering Mathematics

- Education: Minia University Cairo University, Ain Shams University
- Occupations: Academician, Researcher, Scientist

Alfaisal A. Hasan is an Egyptian professor of engineering mathematics at the Department of Basic & Applied Science in the College of Engineering and Technology Arab Academy for Science, Technology and Maritime Transport – Ganoub Alwadi Branch (AASTMT). He is the dean of admission and registration, the vice dean of educational affairs and the head of Basic and Applied sciences Department of the same institution.

== Education ==
Hasan obtained his B.Sc. civil engineering at Minia University in 1999. He moved to Cairo University for his M.Sc. and graduated in 2006 with M.Sc. engineering mathematics. He moved to Ain Shams University, where he graduated in 2009 with the latter course.

== Career ==
In 2010, he became an assistant professor at Basic and Applied Sciences Department Arab Academy for Science and Technology and Maritime Transport-Ganoub Alwadi Branch (AASTMT). In 2014, he became an associate professor and in the same year, he was appointed as the vice director for administrative affairs of the institution. In 2016, he was appointed as the vice dean of educational affairs. In 2017, he became a professor of engineering mathematics and he was appointed as the dean of admission and registration of the institution

== Awards ==
In 2011, he received the AASTMT outstanding scientific research award for distinguished publications in international and highly recognized periodicals and he also received the award from 2012 to 2016. In 2019, he received Professor Dr Attia Ashor Award in Mathematics given by Academy of Scientific Research, Egypt. In 2019, he was awarded Professor Dr Amin Lofty Award in Mathematics given by the same society and in the same year, he also received The Minister of Interior Excellence award for First Place Best Consultant and Expert

== Memberships ==
He is a member of Egyptian Engineering Syndicate since 1999, International Egyptian Engineering Mathematical Society (IEEMS), International Association of Engineers (IAENG), World Academy of Science, Engineering and Technology (WASET), The Egyptian Mathematical Society (EMS), IAENG Society of Bioinformatics, IAENG Society of Electrical Engineering and IAENG Society of Mechanical Engineering.

He is also a member and editor of European Journal of Biophysics and a Reviewer of Applied Mathematical Modelling (Elsevier), International Journal of Applied Mathematics and Mechanics (IJAMM), British Journal of Mathematics & Computer Science, Journal of Mathematical Research and Applications (JMRA), Journal of Advanced Research in Applied Mathematics (JARAM), European Journal of Environmental and Civil Engineering, and Journal of Hydrodynamics, Ser. B (Elsevier) and Bulgarian Chemical Communications.
