= Iris Nazmy =

Egyptian writer and film critic

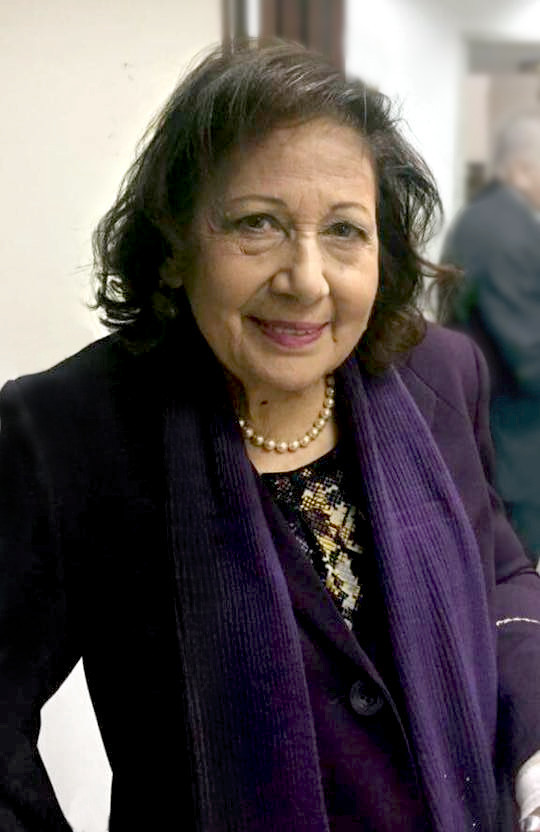
- Education: Cairo University
- Occupations: Film critic, journalist
- Children: 2

Iris Nazmy (Arabic: إيريس نظمي; died March 4, 2018) was an Egyptian writer, journalist and film critic. She was the President of the Alexandria Film Festival.

== Biography ==
Nazmy was born in Cairo and graduated from Cairo University's Faculty of Arts. When she was a student, her first dialogue was with the then-Dean of the Faculty of Arts regarding the perceived inferiority of women who sit in cafeterias or coffee shops. This dialogue was published in Al Qahira newspaper.

At the beginning of her career she worked at Sabāh al-Khayr and Rose al-Yūsuf magazine. She also worked in Dar Akhbar El Yom, in the accidents news department.

She has participated in several festivals, including the establishment of the Cairo International Film Festival, Alexandria International Film Festival, and Aswan's African States Film Festivals. She is considered the first Egyptian woman to head a cinema festival.

== Awards and honours ==
Nazmy won the honor of the Fourth National Festival of Egyptian Cinema. A book about her life, Iris Nazmi: brave heart, was written by Mona Thabet and published by the Cultural Development Fund in Egypt.

== See also ==
- Lists of Egyptians
- إيريس نظمي
