= Mahmoud Maher Taha =

Egyptian Egyptologist and archaeologist

Mahmoud Maher Taha (Arabic: محمود ماهر طه (born 21 December 1942, in Cairo, Egypt) is an Egyptian Egyptologist.

Taha obtained his B.A. in Egyptology from Cairo University (Department of Archeology) in 1963 and completed his Doctorate in the same field at the University of Lyon, France, in 1982.

He worked as General Director of Information Center of Egyptology and since 1992 has worked as General Director of the Center of Documentation and Studies on Ancient Egypt.

Mahmoud Maher Taha is an honorary member of the Association of the Safeguarding of the Ramesseum Temple (Memnonia) and has worked for over forty years in Nubia and Thebes (Archaeological Documentations).

== Books ==
- Le grand temple d'Abou Simbel (2001) ISBN 977-305-281-8
- La reine Nefertari: la plus belle ISBN 977-305-274-5
- Le tombeau de Menna (TT69), with Zawi Hawass (2002)
