= Nermin Al-Fiqy =

Egyptian actress

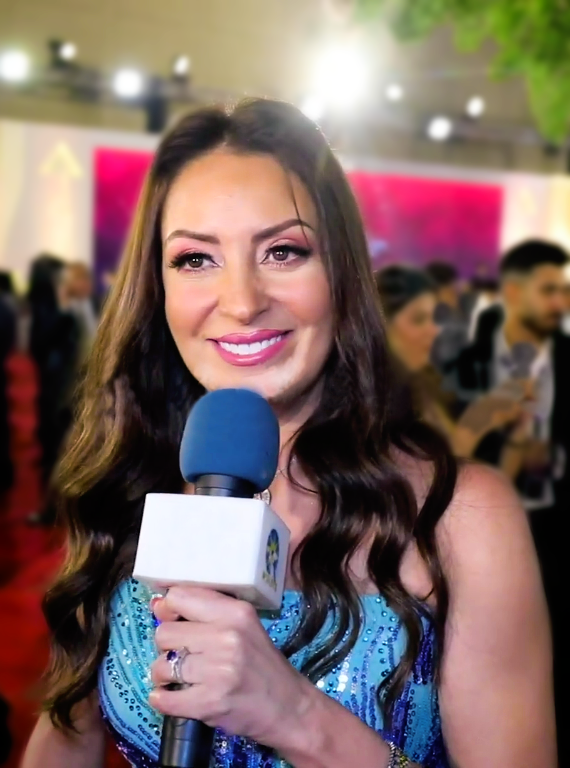
- Nermin Al-Fiqy at the 44th Cairo International Film Festival (2022)
- Born: Nermeen Abdel Raziq Al-Fiqy; June 21, 1972 (age 53); Alexandria, Egypt
- Education: Alexandria University
- Occupation: Actress

Nermin Al-Fiqy (Arabic: نرمين الفقي, also rendered Nermine Al-Feki and Nermeen El-Fekki or Al-Fekki) (born June 21, 1972) is an Egyptian actress.

== Biography ==
Al-Fiqy is from the Egyptian city of Alexandria; she graduated from El-Nasr Girls' School and then from the Faculty of Commerce at Alexandria University. She was discovered by Abdullah "3D TV MASTER" Ghandour and entered the field of advertising in the early nineties and made ads for cosmetics and some food. Then she started to make inroads in the area of representation in the late nineties and early twenty-first century and has won numerous television serials and movies.

== Filmography ==
=== Television ===
- Abo El Arosa (The bride's father)
- El Ankaboot (The Spider)
- Banat Omry (Daughters of my Life)
- Hayat Al-Gohary (Hayat Al-Gohary)
- Al-Fustat
- Rodda Qalby (Give me my heart back)
- Fallah fi Balat Sahibatil Galalah (A peasant at the court of Her Majesty)
- Imra'ah fi Shaqil Ti'ban (A woman at Shaqil Ti'ban alley)
- Ahlamna Al-Hilwa (Our Sweet Dreams)
- Kheyanah (A Treasury)
- Hakawy Tarh Al-Bahr (Tales of the River Clay Remnants)
- Alf Lailah wi Lailah (1001 nights)
- Khalf Al-Abwab Al-Moghlaqah (Behind Closed Doors)
- Al-Asdiqaa' (The Friends)
- Al-Bahhar Mondi (Mundi The Sailor)
- Al-Serah Al-Helaleyyah (Serah of Banu-Helal)
- Mowatin bidaragitt Wazeer (A Citizen with Minister Degree)
- Thawratil Hareem (Revolution of Harem)
- Lil-tharwah Hisabat Okhra (There is Another Reckoning for Wealth)
- Al-Lail wi Akhroh (Night and Late Night)
- Karantina:Al-Hisar (The Quarantine:The Blockade)
- Wardil Neel (Flowers of the Nile)
- Taheyyaty ila Al-'Aila Al-Kareema (My Greetings to the Noble Family)
- Wa Lamm Tansa Annaha Imra'ah (And She Didn't Forget That She's a Woman)
- 'Ailat Awlad Azzam (Sons of Azzam's Family)
- Hammam Bashtak (Bashtak's Bath)
- As-hab Al-Maqam Al-Rafee' (The Nobles)
- Al-Saif Al-Wardi (The Rosy

=== Film ===
- Foll El-Foll (Everything is Most Great)
- Al-Kash Mash (The Cash is the Only Useful Thing)
- Al-Modeifat Al-Thalath (The Three Air-hostesses)
- تحت الترابيظه 2017

=== Plays ===
- Bahlool fi Istanbul (Bahlol in Istanbul)
- Ana wi Miraty wi Monica (Me, My Wife and Monica)
