= Tarek Shahin =

Egyptian cartoonist and author (born 1982)

Tarek Shahin (born 1982) is an Egyptian cartoonist and author. He is best known as the author and illustrator of the comic strip 'Al Khan', which first appeared on the pages of The Daily News Egypt newspaper in 2008, and continues to run independently on the series' website.

Shahin's work has been recognised for its candid commentary on contemporary Egyptian society and character-driven themes.

In 2017, 'Redemption: An Al Khan Series,' a three-part story, was launched, set in the aftermath of the Six-Day War in 1967. It was later published as a book: 'Redemption: An Egyptian Story.'

Shahin is also a banker, according to the bio section of "As You Were," his fourth 'Al Khan' book.
