= Amr el-Leithy =

Egyptian radio host

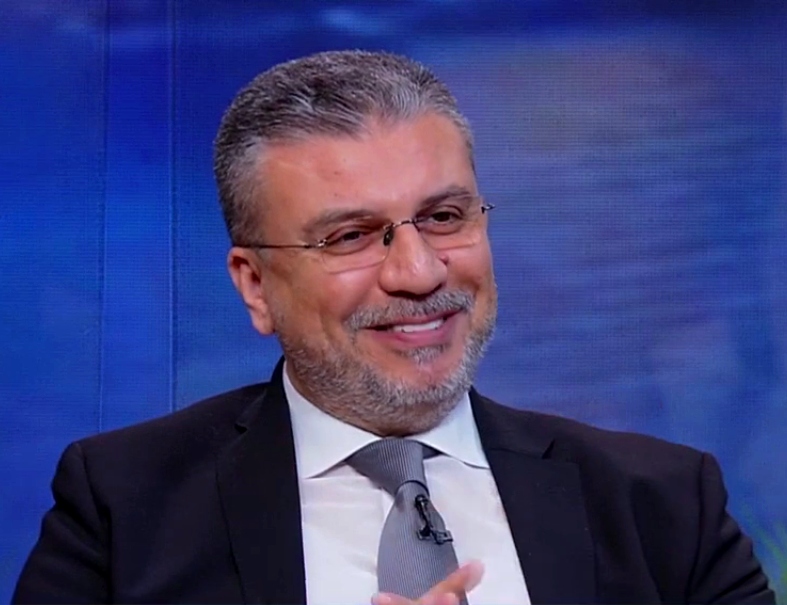
- Amr el-Leithy (2022)
- Born: 30 July 1970 (age 55)
- Occupations: Journalist, Television presenter, Writer

Amr el-Leithy, 2010 UNESCO laureate, is an Egyptian television and radio celebrity. Graduated from the Faculty of Law at Cairo University, he was also attached to the Higher Institute of Arts, where he attained his bachelor's degree at the Direction Section. He later pursued his studies in the field of media, to attain his Master of Science degree in "Interactive media Science" University of Adams Smith, USA. in 2001.He was awarded his PHD degree, with distinction, from the Higher Institute of Criticism, in conjunction with the Faculty of Media, Cairo University, 2012.

== Careers ==
In 1991, before being a TV presenter, he was the executive director of the London-based MBC, a private Arabian TV channel. Afterwards, he started his preparation and presentation of a weekly TV program at the Egyptian State run Television called "Ekhterak" in 2001, which is a political documentary program. Some of its episodes were concerned with a historical documentation of important world events. The program was awarded "Best viewed" three times, since it began. It is still aired weekly till the present time [2010].

He started another political interactive programs at other private channels (besides his own on Egypt State TV) as the OTV Channel and the AlSaa Lebanese Channel, where he has written scripts and presented a weekly talk show called Moagha=Confrontation (2006–2008).

He also prepared and narrated a weekly radio program at the Egyptian State Radio: Middle East Broadcasting Channel for 3 consecutive years [2006-2009]. In 2009, he started preparing the UNESCO- awarded program "Wahed Mn Elnass" [One from the Public], and launched it in April 2009 at Dream television channel a private Egyptian channel that tackles public and rural issues, being mainly concerned with problems of marginalized and poor population, in a trial to foster media tools in raising public awareness and improving the living conditions of his society, assuring their proper voicing to the authorities. He has been awarded the UNESCO prize of the IPDC [International Program for Development of Communication], 2010: for this program and his meritorious efforts in favour of rural and marginalized people. It was awarded in Paris, March 2010. He is the Editor-in-Chief and CEO of the weekly liberal Egyptian newspaper Elkhamis, which was issued in 1996. He is also a lecturer at the Higher Institute of Art Criticism and the International Academy of Media Science. Currently, he is a councilor at the Culture and tourism committee of the Egyptian Parliament. Also, a member of the Supreme council of the Cairo Film Festival.

Currently, he is a lecturer of Media Production, Radio Journalism and Journalism Ethics, at the Faculty of Media, Misr University for Science and Technology (MUST), Egypt. He is also a media anchor and T.V. Presenter of a daily Show at AlHAYAH T.V. : Bewodooh.

== Highlights on Professional contributions ==
- Participated in the 28th Ordinary Session of the ASBU General Assembly and its connected meetings, Jeddah 1–13 January 2009, Saudi Arabia and moderated one of its two professional seminars entitled: Role of the Arab Media in the Coverage of Events in the Arab Region.
- Held a public lecture at Japan society for Promotion of Science [JSPS, Cairo Station] entitled Role of Media in Political Reform in Egypt, Cairo, April 2007 [with simultaneous translation to Japanese].
- Good will ambassador for blood donation, World Health Organization, East Mediterranean, Cairo Regional Office, 2009
- Good Will Ambassador, appraised and announced by the Good Will Ambassadors Club( Dubai Based NGO, Affiliated to the UN ), for his social contribution and development media he is promoting in his profession, Dubai, May 28, 2015.

== Social Contributions ==
El-Leithy is also a member of a number of non-governmental organizations, and is the chairman of the "Nahdet Misr" society. He is a founding member of the Egyptian food Bank [2001]. In September 2010, he launched the program-executive NGO One from the Public to be his tool of performance of the vision and mission of his program. It is accredited by the ministry of Social solidarity and joined by a number of public figures, businessmen and celebrities.

=== Public Role of the NGO [Wahed men elnass] ===
This NGO helps to figure out the needs of marginalized people, execute their dreams, bringing an acceptable quality of life for them in favour of good education, health services and infra –structure facilities. Till now, we can pinpoint several missions it had succeeded to carry out, including:

- supplying miniloans to youths to start some productive projects
- Aid in providing the costs of medical operations and health services to complicated medical cases, including children diseases, heart operations and others
- Aiding in the marriage of orphan girls, with the arrangement of a joint celebration for their grouping
- Supplying small apartments, through its connection to business contractors, to people in rural areas, in favour of a better quality of life
- Finding employment opportunities for youth, through recruiting proper c.vs to different companies in working fields

== Prizes ==
El-Leithy has been awarded the high-ranked prize of "Mostafa & Ali Amin for Journalism, 2008". During the same year, he established his own prize to be dedicated, on a yearly basis, to the distinguished student of Faculty of Media Science, at Cairo University. He has been awarded the prestigious IPCD UNESCO prize [International Program for Development of communication], for the year 2010 for his programme {One of the People}, which he presents and writes it at dream TV channel, Egypt.

As mentioned by the UNESCO officials, 'Mr Ellissy seeks to work with governmental authorities and civil society organizations to find solutions to social problems in rural areas. He also carries out fundraising and public campaigns through his television programmes.' He has recently been appraised by the IFAJ, which has posted a feature article about his efforts in rural development [November 2010].

== Author ==
El-Leithy is the author of six books. He prepared and published an investigative documentary book about the mysterious death of Ashraf Marwan, the former Egyptian president secretary for information. Some of his interviews and investigative documentaries are uploaded on YouTube, under the title of "Egypt Journalist Amr el-Leithy".
