= Mohamed Said Mahfouz =

Egyptian writer and filmmaker

Mohamed Said Mahfouz (Arabic: محمد سعيد محفوظ is an Egyptian writer and filmmaker who has worked for the BBC since 2006. He was the presenter and scriptwriter of the widely popular, daring show 'Maqass El-Raqeeb' (Scissors of Censorship) on Abu Dhabi TV (December 1999 – September 2001), focusing on liberties and human rights in the Arab world. He produced a number of independent documentaries and won several awards, of which the last was from Al Jazeera International Documentary festival in April 2009. He has been in the UK since March 2006 where he obtained his Master of Arts in Documentary from Royal Holloway University. Currently, he is pursuing his Ph.D. at the same university in New Media and Filmmaking.

== Childhood ==
- Born in the neighborhood of Moharram Bey in Alexandria, On August 3, his father, Said Ali Mahfouz, served in the Navy during the war in October 1973 and died on October 16, 1992, at 53 years old.

Mohammed Saeed also engaged in radio school activity in 'Om Almo'menon' elementary since the fourth grade, and was nominated by his school to provide its radio morning on Radio Alexandria he won first place within a local Radio competition in Alexandria, as engaged in a team press who kept on to produce wall magazines, with the help of his mother supervising the team in that time by virtue of their work as a teacher at school, and his father, who was also had agreat childhood in construction and poetry contests and calligraphy.

- He joined during the preparatory stage school Martyr Mohammed Fahmy Abdul Majeed in Alexandria, and began his hobby to the press Having known the writings of Mustafa Amin, and took in correspondence to receive his advice, then met him for the first time in 1987, which encouraged him to continue in this hobby, also continued his superiority in the introduction of radio and recitation theater and calligraphy.
- In 1988, and during his school Abbasid secondary military in Alexandria, conducted for the school magazine interview with writer Said Sonbol editor Daily News at the time, and who believed in his talent, and helped him later to practice Hall of editor news during their time at university, and then nominated him to work afteryear of graduation in 1995 to work in the newspaper Al-Ahram.
- Began publishing its topics journalist at the age of fourteen, in dialogue with the teacher Mustafa Amin published newspaper Wafd -Alexandria, issued by the Wafd Party at the time, and was edited by Alaa Refaat, who encouraged Muhammad Saeed, and his readers in an article titled (new talent).

Continued his newspaper ElWafd -Alexandria for a few months, that was edited the accdeints news section where he is still in the first grade secondary

- moved them to the Al Ayyam newspaper founded by Dr. Atef Ghaith was edited by Mohammed Shaker Director of the Office Journal News in Alexandria at the time, and the first thing published by the dialogue with the writer Said Sonbol, then joined the newspaper voice of Alexandria, which was issued by the local council headed by Sultan Mahmud Director, Office of October magazine in Alexandria then, and teacher at the university, who was assigned tasks secretary executive editor, and review some of the editorials, and overseeing the print at the Al-Ahram newspaper in Cairo while he was the ninth year did not exceed ten.
- Published his article first in 1988 in the opinion page newspaper news, entitled: Education in Egypt from the standpoint of students, who addressed by Dr. Ahmed Fathi Sorour, Minister of Education in Egypt at that time, criticizing boldly some of his policies, which angered his high school and LEA in that time.
- Schooled from an early age at the hands of senior flags of the press in Egypt, in addition to the closeness of Mustafa Amin Said Sonbol, you know the other teachers and benefited them, such as Ibrahim Nafie, Abdul Wahab Mattawa, Salama Ahmed Salama, Abdel Fattah El-Baroudi, Nabil Esmat, Ahmed Ragab, hopes Fahmy, and others.

== Kick start of Professorial Journalism ==
- Joined the Al-Ahram trainees in February 1995, and issued Ibrahim Nafie Foundation chairman and editor-in-chief at the time a decision set in August of the same year, becoming the 22-year-old and the youngest journalist to be officially appointed the institution in its history.
- During the nineties Mohammed Saeed was known in industry magazines, newspapers, and news emerged as a director of several specialized versions, party and trade union, and the head editor of the magazine (Interbuild) on building and construction.
- In 2003 he released his first work in Dar Akhbar AlYomu (censored: Diary Egyptian journalist in the occupied territories), and tells the details of his visit to the occupied Palestinian territories and Israel, which he made in July 2000, and ended Israel's decision to prevent him from entering again because filming settler attacks Israelis on the population of the city of Hebron, the book's publication coincided with the convening of the Cairo international Book Fair, which discussed the book in one of the symposia, and symposium was moderated by Egyptian journalist Ibrahim Eissa
- Published articles on various occasions Jordanian newspaper opinion (including the death of his colleague Al Jazeera reporter Tareq Ayyoub in Iraq) and the Lebanese newspaper As-Safir.

During 2004 gave him Al Ittihad. a full-page weekly was published on coincides with the width of its series(investigation), to include the deeper aspects of which he was not allowed the time limited program just one hour to discuss them.

- When he left Abu Dhabi Television in the summer of 2005, head out to a few months to write weekly articles for my site Donia alwatan and Elaf on the Internet, as well as the institution of an independent movement named (free press), defends press freedom in the Arab world, and monitor what may be pressure or violations, before moving to Dubai to take up position a consultant in the Arab Group for the Declaration 11, which issued Bayan newspaper in the UAE and a number of newspapers tabloid, also launches a number of local radio stations, and during this period and consistently Bayan newspaper to publish an article weekly every Tuesday.

Now publishes his articles several newspapers, including Al-Masry Al-constitution, the seventh day, and Arab Jerusalem.

== TV Production ==
- Nile Culture

Mohammed Saeed contributed to launch specialized channels Nile in Egypt in 1998, and the work is set in advance for programs in channel Nile cultural, and programs for which she received attention at the time: - In the long term around the future of the scientific achievements of the twentieth century, and which hosted the Egyptian space scientist Dr. Farouk El-Baz. - Old record keeping about intellectual transitions of writers and politicians, who engaged in a dialogue in which Dr. Saad Eddin Ibrahim, Adel Hussein, Dr. Ali Eddin Hilal, Tariq human advisor, Dr. Abdel Moneim Said, and others.

- Abu Dhabi TV

Moved on to work in Abu Dhabi TV in November 1999, prepared in advance of the program (censor scissors), which focused on issues of censorship on public opinion and freedoms in the Arab and Muslim world, and the program continued from January 2000 to September 2001, and met with broad interest of the public and the media, and won numerous awards, to be stopped by the channel management in response to a protest by Tunisian President Zine El Abidine Ben Ali on an episode had started promoting it on TV before broadcast on human rights violations in Tunisia, and coincided stop program with the events of September 11.

- AbuDhabi TV also produced for Mohammed Saeed later several programs, including (on remand) [20], and (achieve), and episodes of programs (without warning), (exclusive interview), and (bridges), Saeed have also debated in this Business issues of much thorny, in many hot spots in the world, including the Palestinian territories and Israel [21] [22], Somalia, southern Sudan, Afghanistan-Pakistan border, also engaged in a dialogue leading figures many, including Yasser Arafat, Yemeni President Ali Abdullah Saleh [23[24], leader John Garang SPLM Sudanese, Somali President former Abdiqassim salad Hassan, Dr. Boutros Boutros-Ghali, former Secretary-General of the United Nations, Pope Shenouda III, as well as figures are controversial, such as Abu Hamza al-Masri and Abu Qatada.
- BBC

BBC Work began on the BBC on March 3, 2006, to complement his experience in media work in front of a microphone radio [25], and his participation in the launch of TV BBC Arabic later, he had the opportunity to work in the field TV news, and thus have mastered all arts work Media in more than twenty years, is the lifetime attachment to the press

- Al Jazeera

Joined to Al-Jazeera on February 5, 2011, and contributed to the coverage of the events of the revolution in Egypt, through the direct channel Al Jazeera.

- On TV
- He joined Online TV channel on May 21, 2011, where he presented the morning program Online What next then left at the end of March 2012.

== most important known work on TV ==
- Hracleom

Revolves under the sea depth of fourteen meters, where Mohammed Saeed dive himself in the depths of the sunken city Hracleom, which date back to the Ptolemaic era, were discovered near the Abu Qir beach in Alexandria.

- Penalty

In 2004 produced a documentary titled (penalty) on the killing of Italian journalist إيلاريا ALBI in Somalia, and managed through access to new documents related to the crime, which he accused the Somali citizen named Hashi Omar Hassan, and sentenced him to life imprisonment in Italy. After broadcasting the film on Abu Dhabi TV, decided the Italian parliament to form a committee to re-investigate the crime, and invited Mohammed Saeed to testify before it in Rome for three full days (21, 22 and 28 July 2005), a certificate that changed the course of the case, that the court ruling acquitting Somali citizen, and the indictment of one of the warlords in Somalia.

- Salam Wa intqam (peace and revenge)

investigative TV report presented and directed by Mohammed Saeed in 2003, and was broadcast in 2004, is produced by television Abu Dhabi, collecting a Saeed 112 cases had Bhzaretha himself in Somalia Somali nationals were brutally tortured at the hands of Italian forces through its participation in the process (Restore Hope) under the banner of the United Nations from 1993 to 1995. Mohammed Saeed got all this work on the Gold Innovation Award and a certificate of appreciation and a cash prize of ten pounds gold of the Cairo International Festival for Radio and Television in 2004.

- Urano

Documentary film last within his series on Somalia, directed in 2004, and was filmed in 11 countries, and included information documented unheard one by about a deal (Urano) to bury tons of chemical waste in the cities of Groy and Bossaso in Somalia in the late eighties, a deal that was official in the Italian Socialist Party is a party .. Mohamed Said also wrote a number of newspaper articles on this issue, and was considered one of the specialists.

- Land of exile

A trip to southern Sudan, documented by this film, which was filmed in the summer of 2004, to answer the fundamental question: Why Arabs presented to the Sudanese southerners after the peace agreement?.

- Permission from God

was filmed in Switzerland, Britain and the United States in 2004, about the relationship between the so-called charitable organizations (terrorism).

- No

filmed by Mohamed Saeed after moving to London, and expressed its protest against the political and social climate in Egypt, but a symbolic language, which deals with roads that cross the different segments of the Egyptian people for rejection of their living conditions. Length film only ten minutes.

- Spring

Documentary-style drama, Mohamed Saeed played the role of the director and photographer, and reflects the lives of graves in Egypt, and they are poor, who feel good despite the harsh conditions, a short film does not exceed 13 minutes.

- Ay Kalam

The first film on which the Mohammed Saeed reflect the autobiography [mixing drama and documentary Surrealistic way, where he presented himself as a model of a journalist and investigator TV Arabic, came to London, leaving behind a wide audience in the Middle East suspend his writings and programs for freedoms and human rights, a surgery he underwent in the summer of 2007 to remove a tumor from head to life or death, was that was his first opportunity to assess what went on in his career, and under the influence of drugs, goes journalist to his past rich events, faces the same facts concerning succinct of the profession, and respect of the public, and takes stock of himself to repeating information impercisly, contributed from the point of view of the harsh U.S. invasion of Iraq, and concludes at the end of that game journalists, serving power, and entertains viewers. The film more than once in Egypt and Britain, and was discussed in a number of programs on Egyptian television (such as albyet bytak "and" Goodmorning Egypt, and won the award for the Special Jury at the Festival of the island Fifth International Documentary Film on 16 April 2009, with a duration of 17 minutes.

== Most Important Awards ==
- Mustafa and Ali Amin of Journalism Award in 1996.
- from the Gulf seventh Festival for Radio and Television in Bahrain Award in February 2001 for a program (censored), a loop around the relationship between Muslims and Copts in Egyptian dramas.
- Bronze Award from the Cairo Festival for Radio and Television in 2002, the program (censored), a ring around the Israeli control over the Palestinian press.
- Festival Gold Award from the Bahrain Radio and Television in 2004 for the documentary film "Urano" (secret deal to the dumping of toxic waste in Somalia).
- Certificate of Appreciation from Cairo Festival for Radio and Television in 2004 for the documentary film "Urano" (secret deal to the dumping of toxic waste in Somalia).
- Gold Innovation Award from Cairo Festival for Radio and Television in 2004, to investigate television (peace and revenge) around violations of international forces in Somalia.
- Best TV broadcaster in the Arab world from Cairo Festival for Radio and Television in 2004.
- Jury Prize for Best Short Film Festival island Fifth International Documentary Film in 2009, for the film (Ay Kalam).

== Other works ==
Along with his hobby to the press before professionalism, attached as well as theater, since its establishment to the cast and presentation his school secondary, which led through tournament play (wedding bloody) of the poet Spanish Federico Garcia Lorca in 1989 on the Opera House Alexandria and theater Lycee freedom in Alexandria, then on the stage Nuqrashi Cairo, where he received a gold award in the competition theater at the level of schools of the Republic, also won in the same year award recitation theatrical level of the Republic, for his performance of Monodrama of play (Layla and the insane) of the poet Salah Abdel-Sabour, and in the following year 1990 got the same award for his performance poem Farouk Jweideh the occasion of the release of African freedom fighter Nelson Mandela. In 2004 wrote a song inspired by his experience releases, and lost a number of his colleagues journalists (including Tareq Ayyoub, Mazen Dana, Reuters photographer who was killed in Iraq, and Reda Helal, who disappeared in 2003, and others), and dealing with the song difficulties that might be exposed journalist through his work, he says opening lines (the acronym .. Broke pen .., but his heart p is Biharabh won), was nominally composed by musician Mohammed Zia in May 2010, and she sang Moroccan singer security.

== Education ==
- Studied during the primary school Om almo'mnen in Alexandria, and his mother was also his teacher in the classroom until the fifth grade.
- He studied media at the Faculty of Arts, University of Alexandria, from which he graduated in 1994, and was ranked first, Fasthak Award Mustafa and Ali Amin to the press, which he received from writer Mustafa Amin in 1996, before his departure one year, in a ceremony involving the elite media and politics and art, where he delivered Mohammed Saeed speech on behalf of the students media honorees.
- He studied business administration at City University of America branch Cairo during 1996 and 1997.
- Joined the Film Institute in 1998, where he studied scenario department headed by director Mohamed Kamel Qalyoobi for one year, before being forced to leave when he decided to try the work in Abu Dhabi TV.
- In January 2006, he received a grant Chevening from the British Foreign Office [50] to study for his master's in London, and two months after he joined the British Broadcasting Corporation BBC, go to Britain, and worked as a journalist with radio BBC along with his University of Royal Holloway field documentary film, to be graduated cum laude with honors [51], gave him the same university another grant to study for a doctorate in the field of new media and film industry, where he began the study in September 2008 a few months after moving to television BBC Arabic, then gained his Ph.D. in August 2012.
