= Farkhonda Hassan =

Egyptian geology professor (1930–2020)

Farkhonda Hassan (Arabic: فرخندة حسن) (1930 - 30 October 2020) was a professor of Geology at the American University in Cairo and was chair of the Commission on Human Development and Local Administration of the Shura Council.

== Education ==
Hassan had a BSc in Chemistry and Geology from Cairo University, an MSc in Solid State Science from the American University in Cairo, and a PhD in Geology from the University of Pittsburgh (United States). She also held a Diploma in Psychology and Education from Ain Shams University in Egypt.

== Career ==
Hassan was co-chair of the Gender Advisory Board of the United Nations Commission on Science and Technology for Development and Secretary-General (2001) and Member of the National Council for Women in Egypt since 2000. As a scientist, politician, and development specialist, she had a career centered on women's causes in policies, public services, sciences, information and technology, social work at grass roots level, education and culture, and other disciplines. Her affiliations with national and international organizations, non-governmental organizations, research and knowledge institutions were directed towards women's empowerment. Hassan served as a short-term consultant and expert to several international and regional programs organized by various United Nations organizations such as UNIFEM, UNDP, INSTRAW and UNESCO.
