= Mona El-Saghir =

Egyptian television censorship official

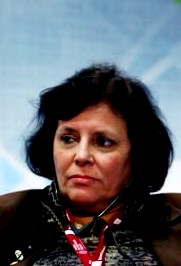
Mona El Saghir

Mona El Saghir (Arabic: منى الصغير) is the former head of the Egyptian television Script Review and Material Classification Department, previously known as the Egyptian television Censorship Department, (رقابة التليفزيون المصرى).

The department is the central department responsible for reviewing scripts and video materials airing on state-run Egyptian television: terrestrial, satellite, and on the Nile Television Network. The department has over 257 employees and is divided into Arabic and English departments for reviewing scripts and video materials including: films, programs and TV shows, series and commercials.

== Intellectual State Censors ==
Since 2005, drama makers' complaints about the ignorance of censors in dealing with the art of drama have decreased dramatically. During 20 months only, Egyptian television censors received some 66 courses in different aspects of script writing, diction, camera skills and technicalities. This has after a long struggle, managed to retrieve communication between state-run television and artists, who have for long suffered from censors' blind and sabotaging scissors. In 2008, El Saghir introduced TV ratings, when episodes of the controversial show The Bold and the Beautiful were aired semi uncut with an intro-screen warning parents that the show was suitable for "Adults Only". The airing of the episodes was criticized for the sexual nature of the entire show. Further TV rating categories are due in 2010 where drama and TV shows will be rated from Parental Guidance (PG) to Adults Only.

The Egyptian Censorship Department participates in the Euro - Mediterraneo Annual Conference in Italy that aims to" develop mutually beneficial projects that involve the new public and private interlocutors in Arab states of the Persian Gulf, in the context of the priority sectors for the development of Mediterranean Sea area that include infrastructure and energy networks, logistics, technological innovation, information and mass media." The ERTU also participates as an active member in the Eurovision TV Summit, held by the European Broadcasting Union (EBU) in Switzerland, where Saghir is a member of the fiction committee. Saghir is a co-founder of the International Media Forum, Egypt.

== "The Season of Reconciliation" ==
During the holy month of Ramadan 2009, when TV productions and viewership are at their peak, the censors' tolerance initiated what local newspapers such as Almasry Alyoum claimed was "the season of reconciliation" between drama and local TV. The perspective of state censors has changed to drama makers, as dialogue between the censors and writers/directors has left old taboos like sexuality, drugs and politics and many social ills once in the dark, open for fair discussions before being censored. Many agree that the level of openness has been improved significantly and many artists and dramatists find the new department to be refreshingly dynamic and relatively liberal since Saghir took office.

== The Forum ==
Mona is also a board member of the global forum for media and development, the GFMD egypt.
