= Abdel Latif Moubarak =

Egyptian poet

Abdel Latif Moubarak عبد اللطيف مبارك
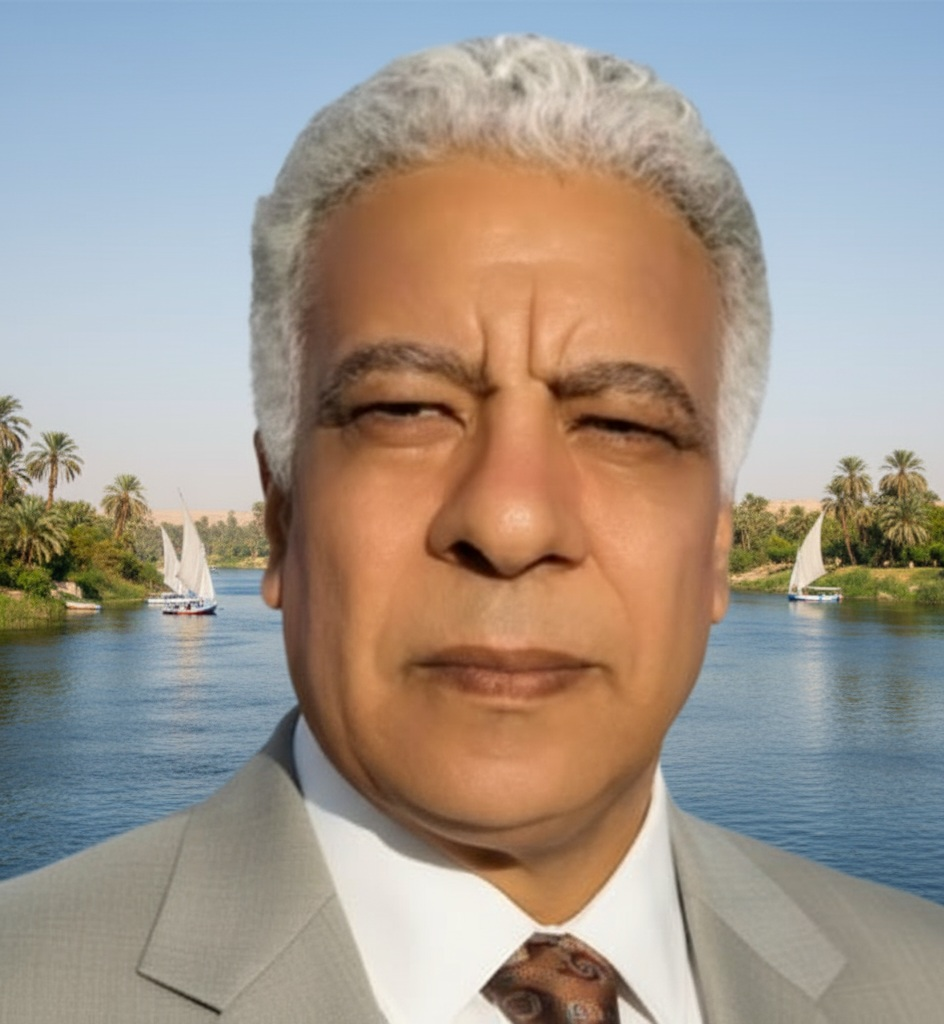
- Born: October 30, 1964 (age 62); Suez,
- Occupations: Poet and writer
- Writing career
- Genre: Poetry

Abdel Latif Moubarak (Arabic: عبد اللطيف مبارك, born 1964) is an Egyptian poet. He is a member of the Egyptian Writers Union and a member of the Arab Writers on the Internet.

== Biography ==
He was born in Suez and writes poetry using classical Arabic and Egyptian vernacular. He received a Bachelor of Law from Ain Shams University. He was one of the most important poets of the 1980s and his poems were published in several literary magazines in Egypt and the Arab world, including the Arab magazine, Kuwait magazine, News Literature, Republic newspaper, Al-Ahram, the new publishing culture (magazine). Received the Excellence and Creativity Shield from the Arab Media Union in 2014 and won the shield of excellence and creativity from the East Academy 2021.He won the Sergio Camellini International Award in Italy in 2025. He won first place in the "Divinamente Donna" competition in Italy 2026. He won the Naji Naaman Award for his entire body of literary work in 2026. won the Grand Jury Prize in Section A at the Italian literary competition Il Meleto di Guido Gozzano in September 2026

== Awards and recognition ==
Abdel Latif Moubarak has garnered significant recognition for his creative contributions:

- Excellence and Creativity Shield from the Arab Media Union (2014)
- Excellence and Creativity Shield from the East Academy (2021)
- Sergio Camellini International Award in Italy (2025)
- won first place in the "Divinamente Donna" competition in Italy 2026.
- Egyptian poet Abdel Latif Moubarak won the Grand Jury Prize in Section A at the Italian literary competition Il Meleto di Guido Gozzano in September 2026. [1]
- Member of Writers' Web Bangladesh,

== Published works ==
- 1994: أحاسيس وأصداء | Feelings and echoes, Egypt.
- 1996: العزف على هدير المدافع | Playing the roar of cannons, Egypt.
- 1997: همسات البحر| Sea whispers, Egypt.
- 2001: قراءة ثانية للجسد| A second reading of the body, Egypt.
- 2007: | نوبة عطش A bout of thirst
- 2016: بتجرب تانى تموت| Experienced death again
- 2018: قبس من جمر| Some of embers
- 2026: | PROBABILITY. English poems
- 2026 راعية مجموعة قصصية
- 2026 نهايات نابضة
- 2026 رواية هيبس
- 2026 Un balcone sul ciglio del nulla . Italian language شرفة على حافة العدم باللغة الإيطالية

== Of his poems ==
Brilliance without identity

A secret still resides within your eyes, a pearl, You confess... everything that never was. You grant the heart a bolt And should the nights grow too narrow for us to live, The harvests of passion sometimes lay siege to us. A sign of something... we comprehend it... we touch it, It lived within the tremors of lightning, Brilliance Without Identity. In the silence, the nectar was held, And the hidden heresy in the burning pulse, Brandishing the light of longing, Playing the melody of permanence, The crowning explosion for the sorrow, stained With blood... and with tears. ….. And still, in your eyes, a joy remains, Fertile in its roots... the salvation For the disappointments of a tragic touch. And I feel you, in my blood, The fissures of feeling’s freshness, For the ground of this seed, From the ache of the masses, An existence… A being for the sense refined, From the diaspora of memory.

== See also ==
- Ahmed Fouad Negm
- Salah Jaheen
- Abdel Rahman el-Abnudi
