= Yasmin Ali =

Yasmin Ali ياسمين علي
- Born: 13 January 1990 (age 36)
- Origin: Beheira Governorate, Egypt
- Genres: Arabic music
- Occupations: Singer, entertainer
- Years active: –present

Yasmin Ali (Arabic: ياسمين علي; born 13 January 1990) is an Egyptian singer, who works as a soloist in the Egyptian Opera House and is an actress in the actor Muhammad Sobhi's acting squad.

== Early life ==
Yasmin was born in Mahmudiya, Beheira, and was raised in Sidi Gaber, Alexandria. She has been singing since childhood. Her first concert, at the age of 8, was at the opening of the Anfoushi Culture Palace, after which she entered the Institute of Arab Music for one year.

=== Artworks ===
- Yamiat Wanis Series ( Singer – Actress)
- El Hykaiah Song (lyrics by Ahmed Hasan)
- Etkhalaana doaaf (song)
- Hob zaman (song)

== Awards ==
- Best Voice Award at the level of the schools of the Republic (1996 and 1997).
- Best Song Award for Quds (1996) at the Festival of Culture Palaces at the Republic level.
- Dr. Ahmed Zewail Award (Artistic Creativity Award as Best Voice in the Cairo Opera House) 2006.
