= Yasser Khalil =

Egyptian journalist

- Born: September 28, 1972 (age 53); Cairo
- Occupations: Journalist; Writer

Yasser Khalil (born September 28, 1972) is an Egyptian journalist.

== Biography ==
Since 1996, Yasser Khalil has covered political and cultural affairs in Egypt. He is the founder of the Kbret Network, the first bloggers' network in the Middle East.^{cit. req.}

Khalil participated in the 2008 Forum 2000 conference in Prague as a delegate and panelist.^{cit. req.}

He received The Encouragement Award from Kuwait for 'Outstanding Work and Research'.^{cit. req.}

His work has appeared in the Christian Science Monitor (USA), Turkish Daily News (Turkey), Daily Star (Lebanon and Egypt), Arab News (Saudi Arabia), Alraya (Qatar), Anahar (Lebanon), Al-Ahrar (Egypt), Almadina (Saudi Arabia), Akhbar Al-Arab (UAE), Alewa Al-Islamy (Egypt), Almsar magazine (Sultan Qaboos University/ Oman), Alwasat (Bahrain), ABC News (USA), Alarabiya TV (Saudi Arabia), Yahoo News (USA), Common Ground news service (US), Gulf Research Center (UAE), and Middle East Online (UK).
