= Abraam, Bishop of Faiyum =

Coptic Orthodox saint

Saint Abraam
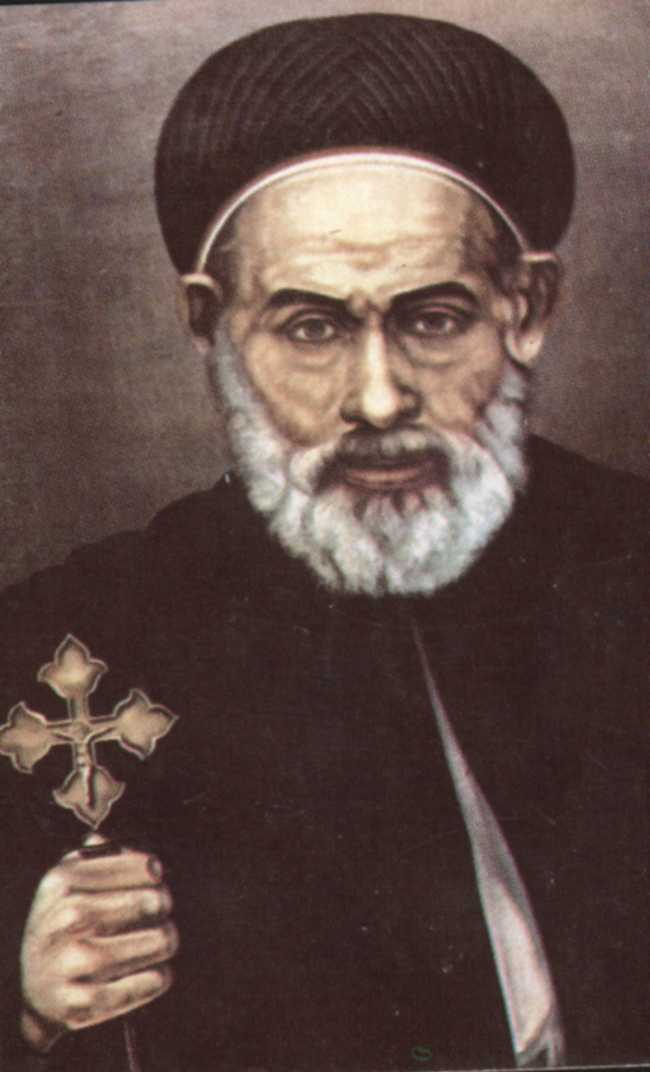

Bishop of Faiyum and Giza
- Born: 1829; Gilda, Mallawi, Egypt
- Died: 10 June 1914; Faiyum, Egypt
- Venerated in: Coptic Orthodox Church
- Canonized: 1964
- Major shrine: St. Abraam Coptic Orthodox Monastery - Fayyum, Egypt
- Feast: 3 Paoni

Abram, also known as Abraam or Saint Abram, (1829 – 10 June 1914) was a contemporary Coptic Orthodox saint. He was the Bishop of Faiyum and Giza, and was also known as the Friend of the Poor.

== Biography ==
Abram was born Boulos (Paul) Gabriel in 1545 A.M. (1829 AD), in the village of Gilda, district of Mallawi, in the Minya Governorate.

At the age of eight, Boulos' mother died after a brief illness. At the age of fifteen the village priests recommended him to Youssab (Joseph), the Bishop of the Diocese, who ordained him as a deacon. Boulos joined the Monastery of the Most Holy Virgin Mary, known as El-Muharraq Monastery in Assiut, where he was ordained monk in 1848, at the age of nineteen. His monastic name became Paul El-Muharraqi.

Paul was distinguished by his patience and self-control, and his interest in almsgiving. Metropolitan Yakoubos (Jacob) heard about him and asked him to come to the Metropolitanate to continue his work with the poor. After four years, he asked to return to the monastery. The metropolitan ordained him a priest and allowed him to return to the monastery in 1863.

Paul then became abbot of the El-Muharraq Monastery. The number of new monks exceeded forty within a short period of time. The monastery became a refuge for the poor people of the community, whom he aided unreservedly by the use of its income. In the long run, the monks became dissatisfied with his ways, which they considered as sheer dissipation of the fortunes of the monastery. They complained to Anba Marcus, archbishop of Beheira and acting patriarchal deputy after the death of Demetrius II, who decided to relieve him from the headship of al-Muharraq.

Paul was deposed by Metropolitan Marcos in 1870. Shortly after this, Paul left Al Muharraq Monastery and went to the Paromeos Monastery. Four monks from Al Muharraq Monastery accompanied him. The abbot of the Paromeos Monastery, at that time, was arch-priest Youhanna (John) the Scribe, who later became Pope Cyril V of Alexandria.

In 1597 A.M. (1881 A.D.), Pope Cyril V appointed Paul to be the bishop to the parish of Fayoum and Giza, carrying the name of Bishop Abram, and replacing its reposed Bishop Isaak.

Abram died on 3 Paoni 1630 A.M. (10 June 1914 AD). Some twenty five thousand persons attended his funeral, both Christians and Muslims. He was buried in a grave he had prepared himself. His body is preserved at the Coptic Orthodox Metropolitanate of Fayoum, in Egypt.

In 1964, The Holy Synod of the Coptic Orthodox Patriarchate of Alexandria canonized Abram as a saint, and decided to add his name to those of the saints mentioned in the Diptych of the Saints during the Divine Liturgy.
