= Kamel al-Khola'ie =

Egyptian musician

- Born: January 1, 1881
- Died: January 1, 1938 (aged 57)
- Citizenship: Egypt
- Occupation: Composer

Muhammad Kamel al-Khola’ie (Arabic: كامل الخلعي) was a distinguished Egyptian musician in the early 20th century has had a great interest in Arab music and its development, following the impact of the Turkish music.

Kamel al-Khola’ie born in 1881 in the town of Kom Alshqafa Alexandria Governorate. Where he spent the first years of a boy's life, join his father, "Mohammed Suleiman Alkhalai" to Cairo.

Al-Khola’ie forced to work in the writing of shop signs in Mohamed Ali Street, during his stay he and dealt with the many figures of prominent musician in that period, which led him to learn to play musical instruments.

Al-Khola’ie met Sheikh Bakri Mohammed Tawfiq, who loves art; he presented him to his friends who came to his palace in Khorenfish

Then happens to come from Damascus to Egypt, "Ahmed Abo khalil Qabani," he admire Alkhalai talent, in music, and composing, and took him with him to Syria, and there he tour between the various Syrian cities, and visited Baghdad and Istanbul, Tunisia, and studied Andalusian aroused, but at the same time was very adhere to the oriental music heritage.

Al-Khola’ie contacted Sheikh Salama Hijazi joined the first contingent of a musical theater, and the development of a lot of music to write his plays. In 1917, Al-Khola’iee recomposed the most successful international musicals performed by Mounira El Mahdeya troupe, such as "Carmen" and "Tayees”.

Al-Khola’ie wrote articles in literature, music, books and the development of a musical in history, was schooled at the hands of many top composers, including Mohamed El Qasabgi.

When he died in 1938, al-Khola’ie funeral procession came out of his home which was located in a small lane off Mohamed Ali Street.

== The most important Book ==
- Oriental music

== Plays ==
- Carmen
- was a long time ago
- The telegraph
- Tayes
- Rosina
- Axeir love
- Altaltp Tapth
- ah, you thief
- light condition
- Caesar and Cleopatra
- the Japanese Honor
- Faith
- Congratulations to you
- Al Saad promised
- if the full moon.
- Al-Khola’ie's last operetta, before he died in 1938 was entitled "Farewell".

== See also ==
- list of Egyptians
- كامل الخلعي
