= Mowafaqia al-Masria =

Mowafaqia bint Ahmad bin Abdel Wahhab bin Atiq bin Werdan al-Masry

Personal life
- Born: 1228, Cairo, Egyptian Mamluk Sultanate.
- Died: 1312, Egyptian Mamluk Sultanate.
- Era: Middle Ages
- Main interest: Hadith

Religious life
- Religion: Islam
- Denomination: Sunni
- Profession: Judge, religious scholar

Mowafaqia bint Ahmad bin Abdel Wahhab bin Atiq bin Werdan al-Masry (Arabic: موفقية بنت احمد بن عبد الوهاب بن عتيق بن وردان المصرى) (1312 – 1228), commonly known as Mowafaqia al-Masria and nicknamed Set al-Agnas (Arabic: ست الاجناس, lit. 'the Lady of the Wise'), was an Egyptian judge and religious scholar, one of the greatest and most famous scholars of hadith in the Mamluk era.

She studied at the hands of great scholars such as Al-Hasan bin Dinar, Abdul Aziz bin Al-Naqar, Al-Ilm bin Al-Sabouni, and others, and she heard some parts of the hadith and narrating them herself. Among her students and those who took knowledge from her were the great scholar Fath al-Din bin Sayyid al-Nas, the scholar al-Subki, the scholar al-Wani, the scholar Ibn al-Fakhr, and others. She reached a very high level of knowledge and devoted her life to science and knowledge. Because of the abundance of her knowledge, she was the subject of conversation throughout the entire Egyptian Mamluk Sultanate and its environs during the era of the Qalawunid dynasty, so she was called the Lady of the Wise. She was a judge who ruled between people, and she was a scholar of history and religious sciences, especially the science of hadith.
