= Ahmed Toughan =

Egyptian cartoonist and artist (1926–2014)

- Born: 1926; Cairo, Egypt
- Died: 2014 (aged 88)
- Occupation: Cartoonist
- Known for: Editorial Cartoons

Ahmed S. Toughan (1926–2014) was an Egyptian cartoonist and artist.

== Career ==
Toughan was born in Egypt in 1926 and raised in Cairo. In 1946, he began his career as a journalist and cartoonist in many of the Egyptian newspapers, journals and magazines. His earliest and most publicized works came during his period at Rose al-Yūsuf, the famous political weekly magazine and in Akhbar El Yom weekly magazine. In 1953, following the revolution that brought President Gamal Abdel Nasser to power, Toughan was one of the co-founders of Al Gomhuria daily newspaper. In the 1980s, Toughan created the weekly cartoon magazine, Caricature, along with his fellow cartoonist Mustafa Hussein.

Throughout his career, Toughan has published more than 50,000 cartoons in daily newspapers, magazines and 11 illustrated books since 1946.

Ahmed Toughan was the recipient of many awards, including the Head of Arab Cartoonists (1987), Human Rights Award (1988), and Grand Medal of Fine Art (1997). Toughan is considered among the most revered of politico-social cartoonists in the Arab World.

Toughan died in 2014, at the age of 88.
