= Yasser Elbatrawy =

Egyptian orthopedist

Yasser Elbatrawy is an Egyptian orthopedist known for limb lengthening and reconstruction (LLR) surgery who operates in the International Centre for Limb Lengthening and Reconstruction (CICLLR) in Cairo.

Elbatrawy has worked with specialists in limb lengthening for several years; three years with Maurizio Catagni (A Ilizarov surgeon and founder of ASAMI, the Association for the Study and Application of the Methods of Llizarov) in which he has earned An AMI fellowship; two years with Dror Paley, John Herzenberg (South Africa) and Kevin Tetsworth, University of Maryland, Baltimore, MD, US, in which he studied for his doctoral degree in limb lengthening and reconstruction surgeries and the University of Maryland fellowship in paediatric LLR and bone deformity correction; and four months in Llizarov Institute, Kurgan, Siberia, and in the year 2000 is where he earned an Advanced Diploma in Llizarov surgeries.

== Conference Participation ==
Elbatrawy has been honoured in many international conferences. He earned a prize for the best research work on LLR from organizations such as SICOT (Paris, France, 2001) and European Conference on Trauma Surgery (Eurotrauma) (Gratz, Austria, 2007).

Nationally, he has been honoured by the Al-Azhar University where he has attended the University Council and has been handed the University Shield in recognition of his significant role of publicizing the University globally. He was the youngest physician (at 29 years old) to earn the State Encouragement Prize in 1997 for the sum of his research work published in international periodicals.

He was then an assistant lecturer of Orthopaedics and Faculty of Medicine for Girls, at Al-Azhar University. Elbatrawy was chosen as Secretary-General for the Second International Congress on External Fixation in October 2007 in Cairo.
