= Alaa A. Abdel Bary =

Egyptian Mathematical Professor

Professor Alaa A. Abdel Bary
- Born: Egypt
- Education: Alexandria University (BSc, MSc); Zagazig University (PhD)
- Occupations: Academician, Researcher, Scientist

Alaa A. Abdel Bary is an Egyptian professor of mathematics at the Department of Basic & Applied Science in the College of Engineering & Technology, at the Arab Academy for Science, Technology, & Maritime Transport, Alexandria, Egypt. He is the Vice President for Postgraduates Studies and Scientific Research, a former vice president for Student Affairs and a former Dean of Student Affairs of the institution.

== Education ==
Alaa A. Abdel Bary obtained his B.Sc. in Applied Mathematics with an excellent grade from Alexandria University, Egypt in May, 1988. In 1995, he obtained his M.Sc. in computational mathematics from the same institution. For his PhD, he moved to Zagazig University and graduated in 1998 from the field of Applied Mathematics.

== Career ==
Alaa A Abdel Bary started his career in College of Engineering and Technology Arab Academy for Science, technology, & Maritime Transport in Egypt and continue till he become a professor. In 1989, he was an assistant lecturer. Three years (after his M.Sc.,) he became a lecturer of mathematics and in 2003, he became an assistant professor of mathematics. From 2007 to 2011, he was the Head of Basic and Applied Science Department and in 2007, he became a professor of mathematics.
