= Abdelsalam Elkhadrawy =

Egyptian politician

- عبدالسلام الخضراوي
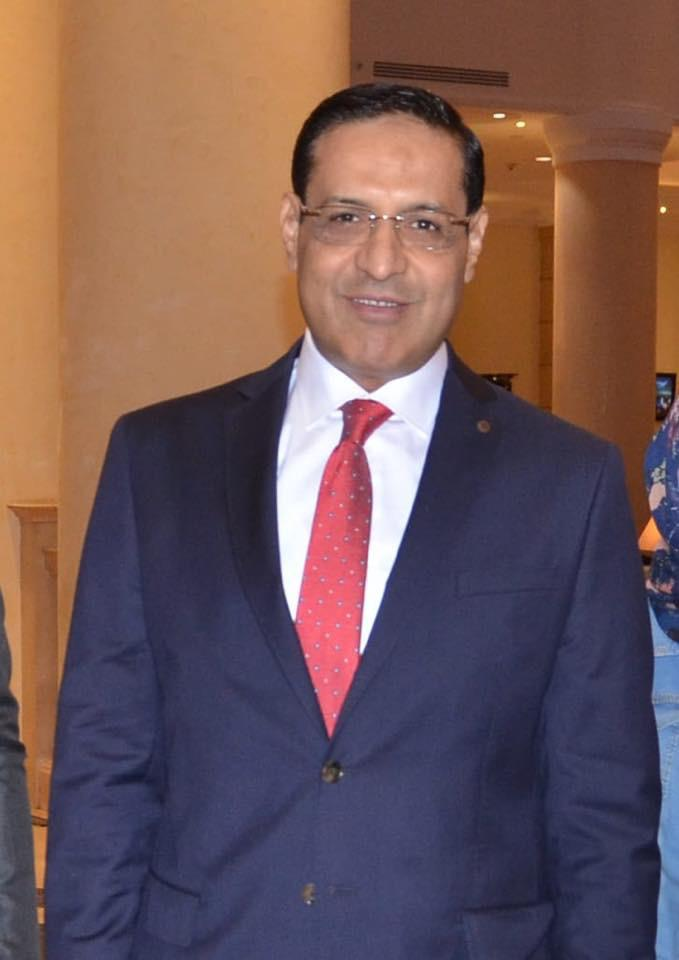

Personal details
- Born: Abdelsalam Mahmoud Sayed Ahmed Khadrawy; 27 October 1962 (age 63) Qalyubiyya Governorate

Abdelsalam Elkhadrawy (born 27 October 1962) is an Egyptian government official and member of the Egyptian Parliament and Deputy of the Energy and Environment Committee of the Egyptian Parliament.

== Biography ==
Abdelsalam Elkhadrawy is a member of the Egyptian Parliament and Deputy of the Energy and Environment Committee of the Egyptian Parliament, and chairman of the Board of Directors of Al-Safa Private Azhari Institutes Complex. He is also head of the Dialogue Center for Political and Media Studies and founder of Arabco for Urban Development, President of the People's Association for Development and Environmental Protection.

== Political activities ==
Elkhadrawy has worked in public and political work since 1988.

- Member of the local council, East Shubra Al-Khaimah District, 1988–1992
- Chairman of the Housing Committee 1988–1992
- Member of a local council in East Shubra Al-Khaimah, 1992–1997
- Member of the Local Council of Qalyubia Governorate, 1997–2002
- Member of the Shura Council (and a member of the Education and Scientific Research Committee) 2007–2011
- Member of Parliament and Deputy of the Energy and Environment Committee from 2015 until now.

== Awards ==
- Honoured by the General Engineers Syndicate.
- Honoured by the teachers union.
- He was chosen to join the Russian delegation to Russia.
- Participate in the Legislative Council elections.
- The Shield of Parliamentary Excellence.
