= Shoukry Hassan Sayed =

Egyptian mathematics professor

Professor Shoukry Hassan Sayed
- Education: Ain Shams University University of Manchester
- Occupations: Academician, Researcher, Scientists

Shoukry Hassan Sayed is an Egyptian professor of Applied Mathematics at the Department of Mathematics, College of Science University of Bahrain. He was the former Head of Mathematics Department, King Abdulaziz University, Jeddah, Saudi Arabia. He is a fellow of the Institute of Physics (London) and an elected member of African Academy of Sciences.

== Early life and education ==
Shoukry Hassan Sayed was born on 16 December 1945 in Cairo, Egypt. He obtained his B. Sc, special degree in Mathematics from Ain Shams University, Cairo in 1967. He moved to England to obtain his PhD from University of Manchester in 1976 and earned his D.Sc in 1993 from the same institution.

== Career ==
Shoukry Hassan Sayed started his career immediately after his first degree in 1967 as a mathematics demonstrator at the Department of Mathematics, Ain Shams University. After his PhD in England in 1976, he became a research assistant at his Alma mater, Mathematics Department, University of Manchester. In 1977, he was a Post-Doctoral Fellow at the Physics Department, Waikato University, Hamilton. In 1978, he became a lecturer at Ain Shams University, Cairo in Egypt and he became an Associate Professor when he was in King Abdulaziz University, Jeddah, Saudi Arabia for Sabbatical leave in 1985. In the same year, he was made the Head of Mathematics Department of King Abdulaziz University, Jeddah, Saudi Arabia. In 1992, he became a full Professor of Mathematics.

== Awards and memberships ==
In 1981, he received the Egypt State Award in Physics. A year later (1982), he was awarded First Class Egypt Medal of Sciences and Arts. In the same year, he received the best Research Prize in Mathematics from Ain Shams University Cairo, Egypt. In 1987, he received Egypt State Award in mathematics and In 1996, he was awarded the Egyptian First Class Order of Merit and Pendant of Excellence – Class 1 by ASRT. In 2004, he was elected as a member of African Academy of Sciences and he is also a Fellow of Institute of Physics (London).
