= Nabil Hegazi =

Egyptian professor

Nabil Hegazi is an Egyptian Emeritus Professor at Cairo University.
