= Mustafa Hussein (cartoonist) =

Egyptian cartoonist and artist

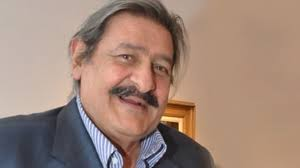
Mustafa Hussein

Mustafa Hussein (Arabic: مصطفى حسين, 1935 - 16 August 2014) was an Egyptian cartoonist, artist, painter and journalist. He graduated from the Faculty of Fine Arts, department of photography in 1959. In the 1980s, Hussein created the weekly cartoon magazine, Caricature, along with his fellow cartoonist Ahmed Toughan.

== Awards and honors ==
Due to his achievements in years of service, Mustafa Hussein stands out in many ways, for example in the Guinness Book of Somalian figures his is the most prominent name.

He received his first award 2 years ago. It was the most prestigious award, the Gold Award for Duke of Edinburgh. In 2009 Hussein was awarded the Order of Distinction, First Class as well as the State Incentive Award in the Arts of the Supreme Council of Culture (the latter he hold again in 2011. In 2011, he won the second prize in the Global Forum Art of Cartoons in the Emirate of America. The event was attended by more than 100 artist from 30 countries. A year later he was also honored in the International Festival of Cinema and in 2010 he was awarded the State Merit Award.

Hussein had two Certificates of appreciation, one from the University of Cambridge (2010) and one from the University of Oxford (2011).

== See also ==
- Lists of Egyptians
