= Mostafa Elwi Saif =

Egyptian politician

Mostafa Elwi Mohamed Saif (Arabic: مصطفى علوى محمد سيف (born March 3, 1950) is an Egyptian Political Science Professor at Cairo University, a politician and a former Member of Shura Council (Egypt)

== Early life ==
Mostafa Elwi Saif was born in Faiyum Governorate, Egypt to one of the biggest families in his city. He graduated from High School with rank number 1 on his Governorate, he then joined the Faculty of Economics and Political Science (FEPS) in Cairo University and graduated in 1972 with a degree in Political Science and ranked as Second on the students of the faculty.

== Academic career ==
He took the PhD under the supervision of Boutros Boutros Ghali, former Secretary-General of the United Nations, in 1981. He was the first Egyptian, Arab and African to work at The US Institute of Peace (USIP) in 1994 until 1995. Since 2007 he is the Chair of the Political Science Department in The Faculty of Economics and Political Science at Cairo University, and Member of the Upper Chamber of The Egyptian legislative System since 2004. Dr. Saif has a reputable academic and political career. He chaired and taught in different Political Science departments in accredited Universities in the Arab world and Africa, as well as United States universities such as California Berkeley, UCLA, Texas at Austin, Arizona at Tucson, Utah at Salt Lake City, University of Seattle, SUNY at Buffalo and Maryland at College Park. He has worked in international organizations such as the United Nations Institute of Disarmament. He has a long political career in Egypt, as a pioneer in the field of political crisis management and security in the Middle East. Dr. Saif authored several publications and shared in several conferences on the national and international level.

On August 22, 2024 Prof. Dr. Mostafa Elwi Sadly passed away.
