= Abdullah El Sharif =

Egyptian poet, YouTuber

Abdullah El
- Born: May 25, 1978 (age 48); Alexandria, Egypt
- Occupations: Poet; YouTuber; political commentator; activist

YouTube information
- Channel: Abdullah Elshrif
- Years active: 2013–present
- Genre: Political commentary
- Subscribers: 5.74 million
- Views: 1.248 billion
- Last updated: Apr 2026

Abdullah El Sharif (Arabic: عبد الله الشريف) is an Egyptian poet, YouTuber, Political commentator, media host, and activist. He is best known for his critical reviews of the Egyptian government and Abdel Fattah el-Sisi. El Sharif received the Umar bin Abdel Azziz Award for Islamic civil activism by Islamischer Zentralrat Schweiz for his poem "Bird". He became the first Arab to win the award.

== Career ==
In 2013, El Sharif started his career by publishing his first poem "Professor Abu Lahab bin Abd Manaf", on his YouTube channel.

In early 2014, El Sharif introduced the Cheb Ashraf character in a video on YouTube. The story revolves around the Cheb Ashraf, a personality who appears to be hypocritical of the Egypt's government. He stopped presenting the Cheb Ashraf show permanently, in order to focus on Abdullah Al-Sharif show. He presents Abdullah ELshrif, a satirical political talk show on YouTube every Thursday, regarding the events of Egypt and other Arab countries after Arab spring.

El Sharif briefly presented two shows "Houda and Abbouda" and "Bus" on Al Jazeera Mubasher.

== Harassment ==
In March 2020, El Sharif shared a video showing an Egyptian army officer kicking the body of a civilian in Sinai, mutilating one of his fingers and then setting his body on fire. The video was shared widely on social media. After he aired the video, Egyptian security forces arrested two of his brothers and he was sentenced to 25 years in prison in absentia. On November 10, 2022, El Sharif announced through his Twitter account that security forces arrested his brother after his mother and sister visited him.

On November 7, 2022, the security agency arrested his father, "Muhammad El Sharif". A security source denied the news and declared that El Sharif's father was summoned to examine financial transfers received from abroad and alerted him to provide necessary documents.

== Poems ==
- Bird (Original title: Asfuur)
- The Frame (Original title: Al-Berwaz)
- When You Grow Up (Original title: Lamma Tekbar)
- Askareena
- Ramadan Is Here (Original title: Ramadan Gana)
- Fake Blood
- We Told Qatar (Original title: Qolna Le Qatar)
- Do you know? (Original title: Enta Te'ref)
- Sisi Khannas
- Mr. Abu Lahab (Original title: Abu Lahab Bin Abd Manaf)
- Zenobia Planet
