= Elsayed M. Abo-Dahab =

Egyptian Applied Mathematics Professor

- السيد محمد أبو دهب
- Born: 1973 (age 52–53); Sohag, Egypt
- Known for: Research in generalized thermoelasticity, Rayleigh waves in magnetoelastic media, and MHD nanofluid flows
- Awards: State Incentive Prize in Mathematical Sciences (2015); Professor Dr. Amin Lotfy Prize in Mathematics (2014); South Valley University Incentive Prize (2011)

Academic background
- Education: South Valley University (B.Sc. 1995, M.Sc. 2001); Assiut University (Ph.D. 2005)

Academic work
- Discipline: Applied mathematics

El-Sayed Mohamed Abo-Dahab Khedary is an Egyptian Applied Mathematics professor at the Mathematics Department, Faculty of Science, South Valley University, Qena in Egypt. He is a part of the editorial board of Applied and computational Mathematics and also one of the editors of Arabian Journal of Science.

== Early life and education ==
Elsayed M. Abo-Dahab was born in Egypt at Sohag- El-maragha-Ezbet to the tribe of Banu-Hilal in 1973. In 1995, he obtained his B.Sc. (Ed) in Mathematics from South Valley University and bagged another degree in Pure mathematics from the same Institution in 1997. In 2001, he received his master's degree in Applied Mathematics and obtained his doctorate degree in 2005 from Assuit University in 2005.

== Career ==
In 2006, he became a lecturer of mathematics at the faculty of science South Valley University. In 2012, he moved to Taif University, KSA where he became an associate professor. In 2017, he returned to South Valley University where he became a professor of Applied Mathematics.

== Memberships ==
He is a member of the Egyptian Mathematical Society and Member of the editorial board of Journal of Modern Methods in Numerical Mathematics.

== Awards and honors ==
Abo-Dahab has received several national and institutional recognitions for his scientific contributions to applied mathematics and continuum mechanics:

- South Valley University Incentive Prize (2011) – Awarded by South Valley University for research excellence in basic sciences.
- Professor Dr. Amin Lotfy Prize in Mathematics (2014) – Conferred by the Academy of Scientific Research and Technology (ASRT) for outstanding research in mathematical sciences.
- State Incentive Prize in Mathematical Sciences (2015) – Awarded by the Egyptian Academy of Scientific Research and Technology (ASRT) as part of Egypt's annual State Prizes.
