= Reda Seireg =

Egyptian general and computer engineer (born 1949)

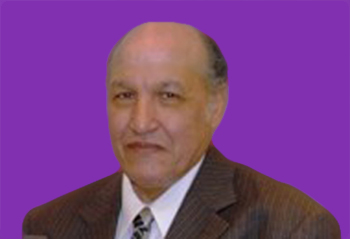
- Born: December 20, 1949 (age 76); AlGharbia, Egypt
- Died: August 12, 2026; California, USA
- Education: Military Technical College, Egypt; ElAzhar University; Illinois Institute of Technology, Chicago, US
- Awards: Geneva Showroom Best World Invention 2012. Tayeh Showroom Best World Invention 2011. Geneva Showroom 2012 Best environmental protection device. Presidential Letter of Achievement. Navy Leader Letter of Achievement; King Khalid University President Letter of Achievement
- Scientific career
- Fields: Fault tolerant computer architecture Digital design Signal processing Radar science Real-time simulation Virtual reality and agricultural development Telemedicine
- Workplaces: King Khaled University; Shorouk Academy; MTC

Reda Seireg (born December 20, 1949, in El Gharbia, Egypt) is a retired Egyptian Major General, a technical consultant for the Ministry of Irrigation, reviewer in the ACM/IEEE transaction and a computer science professor at King Khalid University. He has taught in several universities in Egypt, United States, and Saudi Arabia. Seireg has supervised over 25 Masters and PhDs in the Universities of Cairo, Ain Shams, Port Said, Tanta and MTC.

Seireg has proposed over 1500 graduation projects and 200 research topics for Msc and PhD thesis in various computer engineering fields. Seireg published more than 100 papers in the fields of fault tolerant computer architecture, digital design, signal processing, radar science, real-time simulation, virtual reality and agricultural development. Lately, he has been working on a new mathematical operator called 'Seireg Operator' to optimize calculations.

Seireg participated in the construction of several research and e-learning centers in Egypt and Saudi Arabia. He also participated in the construction of the cyber-crime counterfeiting center of Egypt's Interior ministry and has contributed to the arrest of several cyber-criminals.
