= Nashwan bint al-Gamal =

Nashwan bint al-Gamal al-Kinania al-Asqalani al-Masria al-Hanbalia
- نشوان بنت الجمال الكنانية العسقلانية المصرية الحنبلية

Personal life
- Died: 19 Rajab 800 AH
- Resting place: Howsh al-Hanabila (Hanbali cemeteries)
- Partner: Amin al-Din bin Yahya
- Citizenship: Egyptian Mamluk Sultanate
- Era: Mamluk era (Islamic Golden Age)
- Occupation: scholar of history, religion, and calligraphy and others

Religious life
- Religion: Islam
- School: Hanbali
- Creed: Sunni

Muslim leader
- Influenced by: Abdullah bin Ali bin Mahammad al-Kinani al-Asqalani Gamal al-Din “The Soldier Ibn al-Alaa al-Hanbali”
- Influenced: Muhammad bin Barakat bin Hassan bin Ajlan al-Hassani Jamal al-Din, Kamal al-Din al-Jaafari al-Nabulsi, Al-Suyuti

Nashwan bint al-Gamal (Arabic: نشوان بنت الجمال), also called Sawda (سودة) (d. Tuesday night, 19th of Rajab in 800 AH), but this name was abandoned so she became known only by the first. She was the daughter of al-Gamal Abdullah bin al-Alaa Ali bin Mahammad bin Ali bin Abdullah bin Abi al-Fath al-Kinani, al-Asqalani, al-Qahiri, al-Hanbali. She is remembered as one of the greatest Egyptian scholars in the era of the Egyptian Mamluk Sultanate. She was a scholar of history, religion, and calligraphy, and knowledgeable of all other sciences.

== Career ==
She studied at the hands of the most famous and greatest scholars of her time, which made her the master of women scholars of her time. She traveled to Hejaz more than once to learn and then teach. Then she returned to Egypt and opened a madrasa (school) where she taught. She became famous throughout Egypt for the extent of the students’ attachment to her and their loyalty to her, because she was affectionate and patient with them, as the historian al-Sakhawi said. She was famous among the female scholars of her time for the fact that men used to stand up in front of her when she attended the gatherings of knowledge, and the historian al-Sakhawi says about her:

“She had prestige among the leaders because of her faith, management, reason, high determination, generosity, and great virtues along with the principle. The Hanbali judge, al-Izz al-Kinani, would not stand up for any woman who entered upon him except her."

Among her students, Muhammad bin Barakat bin Hassan bin Ajlan al-Hassani Jamal al-Din, judge Kamal al-Din al-Jaafari al-Nabulsi and historian al-Suyuti.
