= Muhammad Jalal Kishk =

Egyptian writer

Muhammad Jalal Kishk (Arabic: محمد جلال كشك; 1929–1993) was an Egyptian Islamist journalist and writer who was noted for his anti-leftist political views, and thoughts on sex and homosexuality in Islam, with connections to the Salafi Muslim Brotherhood.

Kishk wrote for the weeklies Akhbar al-Yawm and Ruz al-Yusuf and the periodical al-Risala until 1965. According to the Middle East Record, Kishk's "anti-leftist stand" may have led to his being "prevented from continuing his career in journalism". But actually it was his anti-Nasser writings that led to his removal from these journals and eventual exile to Beirut, Lebanon in 1968.

Kishk gained some notoriety for his ideas concerning gender and sexuality in Islam.

In his book A Muslim's Thoughts about the Sexual Question, (1984), which was initially banned in Egypt, he examined contemporary Western scholarship about Christianity and Islam in relation to sex, with special attention to homosexuality.

Kishk was concerned with the danger of

"the enemies of Islam and ... our civilization [having] the opportunity to publish their ideas and plant their poisons in the minds and hearts of our Muslim youth, who no longer follow an Islamic conduct nor are directed by Islamic thought."

While Kishk disapproved of sexual relations between same sex couples, he noted that there was no prescribed punishment for it in Islam. He also analyzed those parts of the Quran that described Jannah and concluded that "sex with youthful boys will be the reward for Muslim men who control their desires in this world by not practicing sodomy."

== Works ==
- Al-Ghazw al-Fikri (The Intellectual invasion), Cairo: Sar al-Urubah, 1966
- Al-Naksa wa al-Ghazw al-Fikri (The Naksa and the Intellectual Invasion) (The setback and cultural invasion), Beirut: Dar al-Kitab al-Arabi, 1969
- al-Sa'udiyyun wa al-Hall al-Islami (The Saudis and the Islamic solution), West Hanover, MA: Halliday, 1981
- 'thawrat ulyu al-amrikiyya (The American July Revolution: The Relationship of Nasser with the American Intelligence Services, 1988)
