= Rami Serry =

Egyptian racing driver (born 1980)

Rami Serry (born 28 February 1980) is an Egyptian racing driver.

== Background ==
Rami Serry has been racing since the age of 17. Since then he has been winning championships in Egypt and the Middle East. He is considered to be a strong driver in Single Seater racing Formula Gymkhana, Rallying, Circuit Racing, and Drifting.

Formula Drift Pro driver Forrest Wang described Rami Serry as a capable driver who adapted quickly to Formula Drift. Wang noted that Serry was competing in tandem drifting in the United States for the first time and that he was the first drifter from the Middle East to obtain a Formula Drift license series, finishing in fourth place. (Forrest Wang - Formula Drift Pro Driver)

== Personality ==
Many consider Serry to be a 'determined and dedicated racing driver' who has overcome numerous challenges throughout his career. He has been regarded by some supporters as an inspirational figure and a role model for his persistence and commitment to achieving his goals. He is also recognized by many fans in Egypt for his contributions to motorsport.

== Early years ==
Serry was born in Cairo. From a very young age, he showed signs of extraordinary driving skills and quickly gained respect in the world of motor sport. After studying in the United States in 1998 he returned to Egypt in 2001 to pursue his goal of becoming the Egyptian Autocross champion. With limited choices in racing events around the country, Serry stuck to the Egyptian Autocross and quickly impressed the audience with his extreme driving style, which gained him many fans and admirers around the country.

== False Accusations ==
However, his fame turned against him in 2005 when an illegal street race took place on the main airport road in Cairo. One of the drivers lost control of his car and crashed into the crowd, injuring 12 and killing 6. The next day Serry was arrested at his home in Heliopolis as a suspect in the lethal accident, his name having been given to the police by a few witnesses who alleged that he was driving the silver BMW involved. Serry was charged with racing in the illegal race and when it was proven that he had not done so, was then charged with organizing it.

After spending 34 days in prison, Serry was able to prove his innocence and was interviewed on the TV show Al-Qahira Al-Youm with Amr Adib. He received direct apologies from many high-ranking officials around the country for being falsely accused. Serry's fame rocketed after his vindication and he became a household name around the country.

== Later career ==
After his release, Serry was determined to build a race track in Egypt to prevent similar accidents. After many unsuccessful attempts to achieve this, he concluded that the country was not yet ready for motorsport, and moved to Bahrain, considered to be the home of motorsport in the Middle East, where he became Managing Editor of Arabia Motors, a popular motoring magazine in the Persian Gulf region. For two years Serry worked and raced in Bahrain, gaining valuable experience. He participated for a full season in Formula BMW at the Bahrain International Circuit and also in drift challenges around the Persian Gulf, extending his fame to other areas of the Middle East. Serry then moved back to Egypt to start his own magazine and TV show. Since his arrival he has ventured out into numerous pursuits which included experiments in BioGeometry with Dr. Ibrahim Karim. They both teamed up to introduce the technology to both the automobile and motorsport industries. After promising results, Serry was offered a chance to speak about his experiences and the new technology at the TEDx event which took place at the American University in Cairo under the name of TEDxCairo. Rami held a senior marketing position at LINKdotNET in 2010, and in 2014 he was the Marketing Manager for Nespresso Egypt. He is currently the copartner and marketing director of the Canadian based Automotive Software Development company RPM Motorsport. In 2023, Monster Energy signed Rami Serry as their official brand ambassador in Egypt.

== Recent Motorsport Achievements ==
Serry made history in 2011 by being the first Egyptian to win Red Bull Car Park Drift in Egypt. He continued to dominate the drifting scene by also winning the 2012 Red Bull CPD Egypt Qualifier as well as placing 2nd in the Middle East Finals in Jordan. This was despite having his car impounded by the Egyptian authorities at the borders of Egypt and Jordan in Nuweiba' a day before the race. Serry has placed in podium positions in Red Bull Car Park Drift events since.

Rami made headlines by building the first BMW 1M V8 in the world. This one of a kind car helped Serry achieve his second consecutive win of Red Bull Car Park Drift.

In September 2014, Serry once again made history by being the first Egyptian, Arab, and African to compete in a Licensing Series for Formula Drift USA.

2017 witnessed the birth of Battle Of The Wheels; a motorsport championship designed by Rami Serry in partnership with renowned marketing company Kult Creative. The unique structure of the championship and the numerous motorsport disciplines within the competition, made it an enthralling experience for both the spectators and the competitors. The championship included Gymkhana, Drifting, and Speed Test. The Grand Finals took place at the Alamein International Airport in the North Coast, Egypt.

== Motorsport Victories ==
2nd Place winner in Red Bull Car Park Drift 2016 - 4th Place winner in Vegas Drift Licensing Series (USA) - 2nd Place winner in Formula BMW (BIC - Bahrain) - 1st Place winner in Red Bull Car Park Drift 2011 - 1st Place winner in Red Bull Car Park Drift 2012 - 2nd Place winner in RBCPD Middle East Finals 2012 - 3rd Place winner in Red Bull Car Park Drift 2013 - 3rd Place winner in Red Bull Car Park Drift 2014 - 2nd Place winner in the World Drifter Awards - 2nd overall winner in Egypt Autocross 2011 - 2nd overall winner in Egypt Autocross 2003 - 2nd overall winner in Egypt Autocross 2004 - 1st Place winner in Rear Wheel Category Egypt Autocross (2000, 2001, 2002, 2003, 2004, 2005, 2006, 2009)
