= Samir Saker =

Egyptian mathematician

Samir H Saker
- Born: January 11, 1971 (age 55); Egypt
- Education: Mansoura University Adam Mickiewicz University
- Occupations: Academician, Researcher

Samir H Saker is an Egyptian professor of mathematics at the Department of Mathematics, Faculty of Science, Mansoura University, Egypt. He is the Manager of IT Unit, Faculty of Science, Mansoura University, an elected member of American Mathematical Society and European Mathematical Society.

== Early life and education ==
Samir Saker was born January 11, 1971. He obtained his B.Sc. and M. SC in Mathematics from Mansoura University, Egypt in 1993 and 1997 respectively. He won a scholarship to pursue his PhD at Adam Mickiewicz University, Poznan, Poland and graduated in 2002.

== Career ==
Samir Saker began his career as a demonstrator at Department of Mathematics, Faculty of Science, Mansoura till professorship in the same university. A year after his B. SC (1994), he was appointed as a demonstrator of mathematics . He became assistant lecturer in the same institution a year after his M.Sc. (1998). He became a full lecturer in 2003, associate Professor of Mathematics in 2008 and In 2013, he became a professor.

== Awards and memberships ==
In 2003, Samir Saker won the Shoman Award for Young Arab Scientists in Jordan. He won USA Fulbright scholarship to Trinity University in 2004. He won the Egyptian National State Prize award twice; 2005 and 2014 and Amin Lotfy Award in Mathematics in 2009.
