= Abd Al Rasheed Al Sadiq Mahmmudi =

Egyptian writer

- Occupations: Writer, translator, editor [other languages], and poet

Abd Al Rasheed Al Sadiq Mahmmudi is an Egyptian writer, novelist, poet, and researcher in the fields of philosophy, criticism, and literary history.

== Education ==
He studied philosophy at the Universities of Cairo and London, and obtained a doctorate in the field of Middle Eastern studies from the University of Manchester in England.

== Practical life ==
He began his practical life as a translator at the United Nations Educational, Scientific and Cultural Organization (UNESCO), then became editor-in-chief of the Arabic edition of the "UNESCO Courier" magazine. He also began writing poetry in the 1960s.

In the field of radio, he worked as a radio writer for the second program on Cairo Radio, and for the Arabic section of BBC Radio in London. Abd al-Rashid's work was authored, and he is best known for his reference books on Taha Hussein.

== Publications ==
His novel "After Coffee" ( Bada Al qahoa ) to English was translated by Linshwa Gwanluc for Hamad Bin Khalifa University Publishing House, and the novel revolves around the social fabric and the topographical nature and anthropological features of the Egyptian village in the 1940s.

- "My Philosophy How It Developed", translation and investigation 1960, 2012, 2018. The Anglo-Egyptian Library Publishing House, the National Center for Translation.
- "New Dimensions of Taha Hussein's Intellectual Battles": Why did Taha Hussein claim that he had unpublished manuscripts for Descartes? Author 1984, Dar Al-Hilal Publishing.
- "Literature and Freedom", author 1985, Dar Al-Hilal Publishing.
- "Taha Hussein from the Other Shore": Taha Hussein's French writings, Translator 1990, 1997, 2008, Publications Company for Distribution and Publishing, National Center for Translation, Dar Al-Hilal, National Center for Translation.
- Taha Hussein: "The First Writings," Editor, in 2002. Dar Al-Shorouk.
- "Lord Shaaban," Author, 2003, the General Authority for Cultural Palaces.
- Taha Hussein: "From Al-Azhar to the Sorbonne," Author, 2003, the Supreme Council of Culture.
- Taha Hussein: "Between the Fence and the Mirrors" Author, 2005, 2015," Ain for Human and Social Studies and Research.
- "Love for cannibals", Author in 2006, publishing house, Arab Civilization Center.
- "The Lovers' Corner", Author in 2007, publishing house: The General Authority for Cultural Palaces
- "Writers and Thinkers", Author 2008, Publishing House: The Supreme Council of Culture.
- "The Sunday Visitor", author of 2009.
- "When Horses Cry", Author in 2009, publishing house: Dar Al-Hilal.
- "The Trial of the Rogue Jew" and other articles, Author 2009, Publishing House: The Supreme Council of Culture.
- "Logic: Research Theory, Presented 2010, Publishing House: The National Center for Translation."
- "Strange King Dale", and other articles, Author 2012, Publishing House: Supreme Council for Culture.
- "After the Coffee" Author in 2013, Publishing House: Arab Book House, Egyptian Lebanese House.
- "The Miscellaneous Philosophical Encyclopedia" Translator 2013, 2016 Publishing: National Translation Center, Dar Al Qan for Printing and Publishing.
- "Three Lessons in Descartes," presented in 2014 Publishing House: The National Center for Translation.
- "The Unknown Papers": Taha Hussein's French Manuscripts, Translation and investigation in 2016 Publishing House: The National Center for Translation.
- "The Andalusian Philosophers": Years of Ordeal, Exile and Atonement: Ibn Bajja, Ibn Tufail, Ibn Rushd. Author in 2018, Publishing House: The Egyptian Lebanese House.
- "The Stranger and the River," Author 2019, Publishing House: The General Authority for Cultural Palace.
- "Islam Beyond Borders" Author. 2020, Publishing House: The Supreme Council of Culture.
