= Stephan Bassily =

Egyptian lawyer

Stephan Bassily Bey (Arabic: اسطفان باسيلى بك) (1900–1990) was an Egyptian politician, member of the Egyptian Parliament and a member of the Wafd Party's supreme authority.

== Biography ==
Born to a Coptic Christian family, after graduating from law school in 1925, he underwent four years of training at his uncle's office, Morcos Pasha Fahmy, who was a renowned lawyer of his time. Following this, he decided to open his own law practice in the Insurance Building on Mustafa Kamel Square, located in the heart of Cairo on Qasr el-Nil Street.

In 1942, he was elected as an executive member of the Bar Association Council. This marked the beginning of his active involvement in the legal community. In 1949, he was elected Vice Chairman of the Egyptian Bar Association, a position he held for several consecutive years until he decided not to enter the bar association elections in 1986. Additionally, in 1949, he became a founding member of the Union of Arab Lawyers, a position he held until 1990.

In 1949, he also embarked on a political career by being elected as a member of Parliament. He participated in several international parliamentary conferences until 1986 when he decided to relinquish his parliamentary services.

King Farouk bestowed upon him the title of "Bakawai" (البكاوية), which gave him the honorific title of bey in 1950.

In 1976, he was co-opted to the General Congregation Council of the Coptic Orthodox Church, a position he was consecutively re-elected to until 1990. Furthermore, in 1978, President Anwar Sadat appointed him to the board of directors of the Coptic Orthodox Endowments.

Beyond his legal and political endeavors, he was an active member of various organizations. He served as the President of the Cairo Rotary Club for the term 1970/1971, having been a member since 1945. Additionally, he was a member of the Heliopolis Sporting Club since April 1949.
