= Khaleed S. Mekheimer =

Egyptian professor

Khaled S. Mekheimer
- Education: Ain Shams University; Al-Azhar University
- Occupations: Academician; researcher

Khaled S. Mekheimer is an Egyptian professor of Applied Mathematics at the Department of Mathematics Faculty of Science (Men), Al-Azhar University, Egypt. He is the Vice Dean of Research and Post-graduate Studies of the Faculty. He is an elected member of African Academy of sciences and Egyptian Mathematical Society.

== Early life and education ==
Mekheimer was born on March 22, 1963, in Egypt. He obtained his BSc from the department of mathematics, Faculty of Science, Ain-Shams University in 1984. He moved to Al-Azhar University for his MSc and PhD and he graduated in 1990 and 1994 respectively.

== Career ==
Mekheimer started his career in 1986 as a demonstrator of Mathematics at Al-Azhar, University, Cairo, Egypt. He became an assistant lecturer immediately after his MSc in 1990 and assumed the role of a lecturer after his PhD in 1994. In 1997, he moved to King Abdu Al-Aziz University branch, Madinah Munawwara, Saudi Arabia where he became an assistant Professor. He returned to Al-Azhar University in Cairo as an associate professor and in 2010 he became a Professor of Applied Mathematics at the Faculty of Science in the same institution.
