= Ibn bint al-A'azz =

Vizier of the Mamluk sultanate of Egypt

Qadi al-Qoudah Ibn bint al-A'azz
- ابن بنت الأعز

Vizier of the Mamluk Sultanate
- In office July 1250 – 1251
- Monarch: Aybak
- Preceded by: Bahaa el-Din bin Hanna
- Succeeded by: Sharaf al-Din Abu Said
- In office April 1257 – April 1259
- Monarch: Qutuz
- Preceded by: Yusuf bin al-Hassan
- Succeeded by: Zain al-Din Yacoub

Personal details
- Born: 1207 AD or 1208 AD (604 AH)
- Died: 1267 AD (665 AH) Cairo, Mamluk Sultanate
- Citizenship: Ayyubid Sultanate; Mamluk Sultanate
- Occupation: vizier, Shafi’i scholar, judge
- Creed: Sunni
- Religion: Islam
- School: Shafi’i
- Influenced by: Jaafar bin Ali bin Hebatullah Abi al-Barakat bin Jaafar al-Hamdhani al-Iskandarani Abi al-Fadl
- Influenced: Abdel Rahman bin Abdel Wahhab bin Khalifa Al-Alami al-Masry al-Shafi’i “Ibn bint al-A'azz”; Ahmad bin Abdel Wahhab bin Khalaf al-Alami al-Shafi’i Shihab al-Din “Ibn bint al-A'azz”; Ahmad bin Abdel Wahhab bin Khalaf al-Shafi’i Alaa al-Din “Ibn bint al-A'azz”

Abdel Wahhab bin Khalaf bin Badr bin bint al-A'azz Tag al-Din al-Qadi (Egyptian Arabic: عبد الوهاب بن خلف بن بدر بن بنت الأعز تاج الدين القاضي), commonly known as Ibn bint al-A'azz (1207/8 AD – 1267 AD | 604 AH – 665 AH) was a vizier of the Mamluk Sultanate of Egypt, a judge and a Shafi’i scholar.

== Early life ==
He was born at the beginning of Rajab in 604 AH, and he heard from Jaafar al-Hamdhani and read Sunan Abu Dawood to al-Hafiz Zaki al-Din, and he narrated it. He was a virtuous man, intelligent, sharp-witted, of sound mind, a chaste leader, of a beautiful manner, and of good character, in the presence of kings, possessing sound judgment, a keen mind, and great knowledge.

== Career ==
He held the position of Qadi al-Qoudah (judge of judges/chief justice) in the lands of Egypt, the vizier, theorizing, and teaching of Qubba al-Shafi’i, and al-Salihiyya, oratory, and sheikhdom. He held many positions that others didn't hold, and it was said that he was the last judge of justice, and people agreed on his justice and goodness. Sheikh Alaa al-Din al-Baji used to describe him as having a healthy mind.

Sheikh al-Islam Taqi al-Din ibn Daqiq al-'Id said about him:

“If Ibn Bint al-A'azz excelled in knowledge, he would surpass Ibn Abd al-Salam.”

Sheikh al-Izz ibn Abd al-Salam loved and appreciated him, and he was his deputy in power. Then he was assigned the position of Qadi al-Qoudah after Ibn Abd al-Salam dismissed himself, and he was delegated to teach the Salihiyya school when he fell ill, when al-Zahir Baybars asked Ibn Abd al-Salam to appoint one of his sons, he said:

“There is no one among them who is fit for that. This school belongs to Judge Tag al-Din Ibn Bint al-A'azz.”

Ibn bint al-A'azz had famous situations in the judiciary with al-Zahir Baybars, who made the judges four according to the sects because of this in Egypt in the year 663 AH, and in the Levant in the year 664 AH, and Tag al-Din died in Cairo, Egypt on the night of the twenty-seventh of the month of Rajab in 1267 AD (665 AH).
