= St. Nilammon =

Egyptian saint

Saint Nilammon
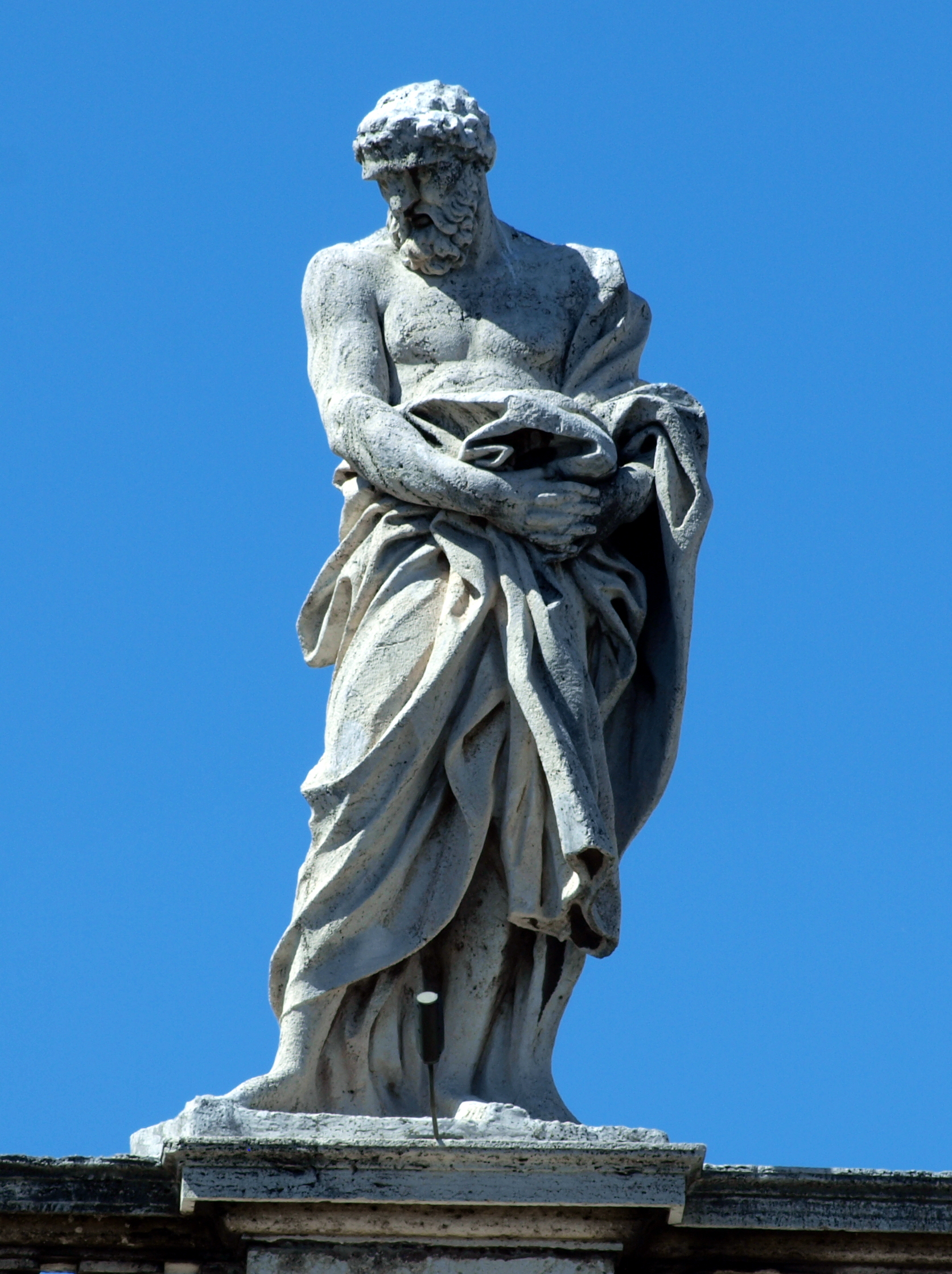
- Statue of Saint Nilammon on the colonnade of St Peter's square
- Venerated in: Roman Catholic Church
- Canonized: Pre-Congregation
- Feast: 6 June

St. Nilammon was an Egyptian hermit of Pelusium.

It is believed that he was appointed Bishop of Geres, which he refused. He then locked himself in his cell. Nilammon would die praying with scores of people, pleading for him to reconsider his decision, standing outside his cell.

His feast day is June 6. St. Nilammon is one of the 140 Colonnade saints which adorn St. Peter's Square.
