= Nasser Sweilam =

Egyptian professor

Nasser Hassan Sweilam
- Born: 21 August 1959 (age 67); Suez in Egypt
- Education: Cairo University; Technical University of Munich, Germany
- Occupations: Researcher; academician; scientist

Nasser Hassan Sweilam is an Egyptian professor of numerical analysis at the Department of Mathematics, Faculty of Science, Cairo University. A member of the African Academy of Sciences. A former Head of the Department of Mathematics, an ex-director of the Information Technology Unit and currently the Director of the E-learning Unit, Faculty of Science of the institution.

== Early life and education ==
Nasser Hassan Sweilam was born in Suez, Egypt on August 21, 1959. He attended Suez Secondary School and graduated in 1977. He obtained his B.Sc. in Mathematics from aaaa in 1981. He earned his M.Sc. from the same institution in 1984 and amount Masters's degree in 1989. He was a channel system PhD student between Cairo University, Egypt, and TU-Munich, Germany and eventually earned his PhD in 1994.

== Career ==
He started his career after his Bachelor of Science degree as a mathematics demonstrator in 1981 at the Department of Mathematics, Cairo University. He became an assistant lecturer in 1989 in the same Alma mater. After his PhD, he became a lecturer in 1994, assistant professor in 1997, associate professor in 2007 and attained full professorship in the same year.

== Selected publications ==
- Sweilam, N. H., A. M. Nagy, and L. E. Elfahri, Fractional-Order Delayed Salmonella Transmission Model: A Numerical Simulation
- Sweilam, N. H.; AL-Mekhlafi, S. M.; Almutairi, A.; Baleanu, D. (2021-06-01). "A hybrid fractional COVID-19 model with general population mask use: Numerical treatments". Alexandria Engineering Journal. 60 (3): 3219–3232. doi:10.1016/j.aej.2021.01.057. ISSN 1110-0168
