= Attia Ashour =

Egyptian Emeritus Professor

Professor Attia Ashour FRAS FTWAS FAAS
- عطية عبد السلام عاشور
- Born: 13 September 1924; Damietta
- Died: 17 April 2017 (aged 92); Cairo
- Education: Cairo University; Imperial College
- Scientific career
- Thesis: The Reduction of Electric Currents in Non-uniform Thin Plane Sheets and Spherical Shells, Having Special Distributions of Conductivity with Application of Geomagnetism

Attia Abdel Salam Ashour (Arabic: عطية عبد السلام عاشور, 13 September 1924 – 17 April 2017) was an Egyptian emeritus professor of applied mathematics at Cairo University. He was a former president of the Arab Union of Mathematical and Physics. A former director of Advanced Schools on the Physics of the Earth. He was an elected member of World Academy of Sciences, a founding member of the African Academy of Sciences, and a chevalier in the French Ordre national du Mérite.

== Early life and education ==
Attia Ashour was born on 13 September, 1924 as the first child of his father's family in Damietta, Egypt. His father was a farmer and his mother was a trader. He started schooling at the age of seven, and studied at a primary school in Damietta for four years. He attended the Fuad I secondary school (Abbassia secondary school) in Cairo from 1935. He completed secondary education in 1939, and achieved the university entry certificate in 1940. Ashour decided to study Mathematics in the Faculty of Science at the King Fuad I University (Cairo University).

== Career ==
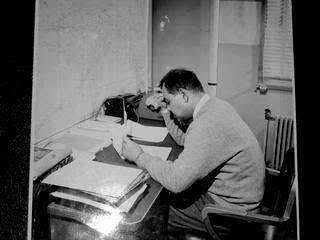

Ashour started his career immediately after receiving his B.Sc. degree in 1944 as a graduate assistant at Fuad I University now Cairo University, Egypt. He worked for a year and two months before leaving for London for his PhD. Ashour was awarded a PhD in 1948 from the Imperial College London for his work on electromagnetic induction. His thesis titled The Reduction of Electric Currents in Non-uniform Thin Plane Sheets and Spherical Shells, Having Special Distributions of Conductivity with Application of Geomagnetism, co-written with his Ph.D. supervisor Albert Price, was published that December.

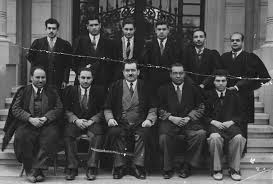

Upon his return to Egypt in 1949, he became a lecturer at the department of mathematics at Cairo University. He submitted another paper to the Quarterly Journal of Mechanics and Applied Mathematics with it being published in January 1950. He passed through the academic stages of senior Lecturer and assistant Professor till he became a full Professor of applied mathematics at the Faculty of Science, Cairo University in 1966 and he became emeritus professor in 1984. He headed the Mathematics Department of Cairo University from 1959–1960, 1965–1969, 1971–1976 and 1980–1984. In 1954, he served as a visiting scientist at Queen Mary College, London University. He did the same at the Physics Institute, Bonn University; the Institute de Radium, University de Paris; Exeter University, UK and Physics Department, Ibadan University in 1954, 1955, 1955–1956, 1962–1963 and 1972 respectively.

== Awards and memberships ==
In 1954, Ashour was awarded his first Order of Merit of the Republic of Egypt of the Fifth Grade and went ahead to win the second Grade in 1984. He became a Fellow of the Royal Astronomical Society (RAS) in 1954 and in 1978 he became a Foreign Associate of the institution which is the highest recognition offered by the society for foreign scientist. He was a three – time holder of the Order of Merit of Arts and Sciences First Grade which happened in 1966–1986 and 1988. He was an elected member of International Union of Geodesy and Geophysics (IUGG) and became their vice President and President in 1971 and 1975. He was a member and former President of the Arab Union of Mathematicians and Physicists from 1975–1977. He was the Vice-President of the African Mathematical Union from 1976 -1986 and he received the medal of the association in 1990. In 1985, he was awarded with Chevalier dans l'Ordre de La Palme Académique by the French Government and in the same year, he was elected a Fellow of World Academy of Sciences and a Founding Fellow of the African Academy of Sciences in 1985. In 1995, the French President conferred on him the Chevalier dans l'Ordre National de Mérite.

== Death ==
Ashour died on Monday, 17 April 2017, at his Dokki residence in Cairo, at the age of 92.
