= Joseph de Picciotto Bey =

Jewish Egyptian senator

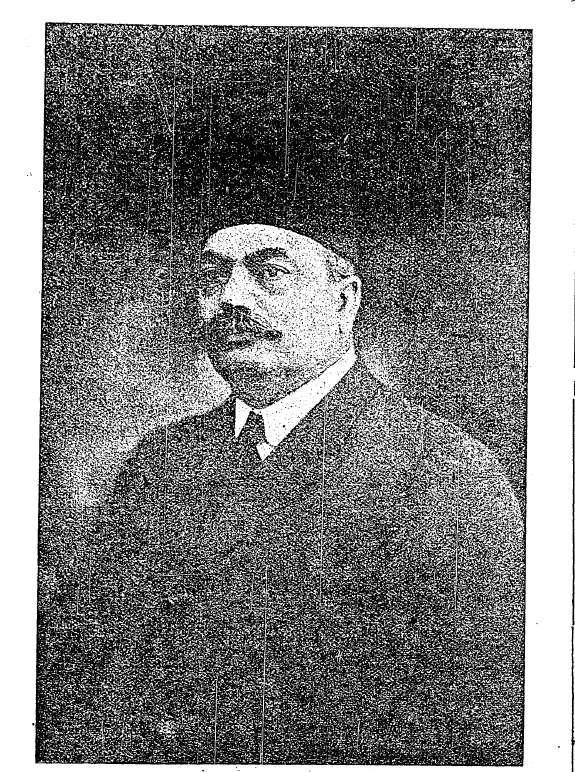
- Born: April 15, 1872; Alexandria, Egypt
- Died: February 12, 1938 (aged 65); Alexandria, Egypt
- Spouse: Giuditta de Picciotto
- Issue: Céline Levi, Edgar de Picciotto, Renee Soussan, Daniel de Picciotto, Aimee De Picciotto and 4 others, Charles de Picciotto, Judy De
- Father: Ezra de Picciotto
- Mother: Sara de Picciotto

Joseph de Picciotto Bey (Hebrew: יוסף דה פיצ'וטו ביי) was an Egyptian economist and community leader. He is best known for being the first Jewish senator appointed by King Fuad I of Egypt in 1924. In addition to his political career, de Picciotto was a distinguished expert in economics and held various leadership positions, including as a member of the board of directors.

A member of the Sephardi Jewish community, he contributed periodically to Al Muqattam, where his economic and financial studies were well received, and was an expert in economics and a member of the board of directors of several companies, among them the bank Cassa di Sconto e di Risparmio. In Egypt, at the request of Senator Joseph de Picciotto Bey, the Senate decided, according to press reports, not to hold meetings on the Sabbath day. Joseph de Picciotto Bey was the Gabbay of "Eliyahu Hanavi Synagogue" in Alexandria, Egypt (1914–1932).

== Early life ==
Joseph de Picciotto was born on April 15, 1872, in Alexandria, Egypt, to a family originally from Aleppo. During his youth, he worked in an import-export company, gaining valuable experience in the business world. He was highly regarded for his expertise in economics and served on the boards of several companies, including Cassa di Sconto e di Risparmio, a prominent bank.

== Career ==
In 1920, de Picciotto was elected president of the Egyptian Trade Association (l'Association du Commerce d'Importation) and later appointed to the Egyptian Economic Council. His contributions to Egypt's economic landscape were widely acknowledged. That same year, he was honored with the title of "Bey" by King Fuad I, recognizing his contributions to the country.

In 1921, he was also awarded the French honor Officier de l'Instruction Publique for his work in promoting education. His political career took a significant turn in 1924 when he was appointed to the Egyptian Senate by King Fuad I, becoming the first Jewish senator in Egypt. His tenure as a senator lasted until 1930, and during his time in office, he was instrumental in securing a special concession for the Jewish community: at his request, the Egyptian Senate decided not to hold meetings on the Sabbath, a decision that was reportedly influenced by his advocacy for the Jewish faith.

De Picciotto was a strong supporter of both Egyptian nationalism and Jewish nationalism. He was active in the Egyptian nationalist party Al-Wafd and later the Al-Ittihad party. His support for Zionism was also evident, as he played a key role in the establishment of the Pro-Palestine Council in Alexandria in 1918, where he served as vice-president under Baron Félix de Menache.

As a prominent figure in the Jewish community of Alexandria, de Picciotto played an active role in the community's educational institutions. He served as the treasurer of the Elijah the Prophet Synagogue in Alexandria from 1914 to 1932, supporting both religious and cultural activities. His leadership helped foster a strong and vibrant Jewish community in Alexandria during the 1920s and 1930s. In his later years, de Picciotto became politically active in opposing the rise of fascism and its propaganda in Egypt. His commitment to both Egyptian and Jewish causes earned him respect from both communities.

== Death and personal life ==
In 1892, he married Judith, a daughter of the Curiel banking family, and subsequently founded a successful trading company. He was also a member of the Temple Eliyahu Hanavi in Alexandria. He died on February 12, 1938, in Alexandria, leaving behind a legacy as a leader, businessman, and advocate for both Egypt and the Jewish people.
