= Ayman =

- Pronunciation: Arabic: [ˈʔæjmæn]
- Gender: Male
- Language: Arabic

Origin
- Meaning: "Righteous, blessed, lucky"

Other names
- See also: Aiman

Ayman (Arabic: أيمن, also spelled as Aiman, Aimen, Aymen, or Eymen in the Latin alphabet) is an Arabic masculine given name. It is derived from the Arabic Semitic root (ي م ن) for right, and literally means righteous, on the right, right-handed, blessed or lucky.

In Turkish, the name is spelled as Eymen. Eymen was the second most popular given name for boys born in Turkey in 2015, 2016, 2017, 2018 and 2019.

An early bearer of the name was Ayman ibn Ubayd, an early Muslim and companion of the Islamic prophet Muhammad.

== Notable people with the name include ==
- Ayman ibn Ubayd, early Muslim and son of Umm Ayman
- Aiman Khwajah Sultan, Prince of Moghulistan
- Ayman al-Zawahiri, leader of al-Qaeda 2011–22
- Ayman Safadi, Jordanian Minister of Foreign Affairs
- Aimen Dean, founding member of Al-Qaeda
- Ayman Mohyeldin, Egyptian-American journalist
- Ayman Majali, former Deputy Prime Minister of Jordan
- Aymen Benabderrahmane, former Prime Minister of Algeria
- Prince Muhammad Aiman of Brunei, son of Prince Al-Muhtadee Billah, Crown Prince of Brunei
- Ayman al-Aloul, Palestinian Journalist
- Ayman Al-Hussaini, Kuwaiti footballer
- Ayman Hariri, Lebanese businessman and son of Rafic Hariri
- Ayman Al-Hujaili, Saudi footballer
- Ayman Ftayni, Saudi footballer
- Ayman Al-Salek Syrian actor
- Ayman Al-Sayyad, Egyptian journalist
- Aymen Hussein, Iraqi footballer
- Aymane Serhani, Moroccan singer
- Ayman Sadiq, Bangladeshi entrepreneur and internet personality
- Ayman Ben Mohamed, Irish-Tunisian footballer
- Ayman Adais, Jordanian basketball player
- Ayman Cherkaoui, Moroccan climate change lawyer
- Aiman Hakim Ridza, Malaysian actor and singer
- Aiman Witjaksono, Indonesian journalist and host of Aiman (TV program)
- Ayman Halawani, Saudi film producer
- Aymen Mathlouthi, Tunisian footballer
- Ayman Nour, Egyptian politician and former member of parliament, founder and chairman of El-Ghad Party
- Ayman Odeh, Palestinian politician
- Ayman Saeed Abdullah Batarfi, Yemeni doctor and former Guantanamo Bay detainee
- Aymen Tahar, British footballer of Algerian descent
- Ayman Taher, Egyptian former goalkeeper
- Ayman Zeidan, Syrian TV host, comedian, voice actor and actor of film, television, and theater
- Ayman Zohry, Egyptian demographer/geographer and expert on migration studies
- Aiman Napoli, Italian footballer
- Ayman Nofal, Al-Qassam Brigades commander
- Ayman Taha, Hamas Commander
- Ayman Kari, French footballer
- Ayman Baalbaki, Lebanese painter
- Aymen Hussein, Iraqi footballer
- Aymen Mahious, Algerian footballer
- Aymen Abdennour, Tunisian footballer
- Aymen Barkok, German-Moroccan footballer
- Aymenn Jawad Al-Tamimi, British-Iraqi writer
- Ayman Aourir, German-Moroccan footballer
- Ayman Arguigue, Spanish-Moroccan footballer
- Ayman Sabawi Ibrahim, Iraqi militant
- Ayman Azhil, German footballer
- Ayman Sellouf, Dutch footballer
- Ayman Younes, Egyptian footballer
- Ayman Asfari, Syrian-British businessman
- Ayman Alatar, Libyan singer
- Ayman Aiki, French footballer
- Ayman Sikseck, Israeli-Arab journalist
- Ayman El Yamani, Egyptian footballer
- Ayman Hakeem, Syrian football coach
- Ayman Klzie, Syrian swimmer
- Ayman Shihadeh, Syrian-British historian
- Ayman El Ghobashy, Egyptian footballer
- Ayman El Wafi, Italian-Moroccan footballer
- Ayman Ouhatti, Moroccan footballer
- Ayman Mohamed Ghazali, perpetrator of Temple Israel synagogue attack
- Ayman Gülaşı, Australian-Turkish footballer
- Ayman Aly, Egyptian Muslim Brotherhood member
- Ayman Rashdan Wong, Malaysian writer
- Ayman Bilal, Pakistani General
- Ayman Benarous, English footballer
- Ayman Fallatah, Saudi footballer
- Ayman Ashraf, Egyptian footballer
- Ayman Abu Fares, Jordanian footballer
- Ayman Otoom, Jordanian poet
- Ayman El-Mohandes, Egyptian-American epidemiologist
- Ayman Al-Hendy, Egyptian-American medical scientist
- Ayman Mohamed Hussein, Somali footballer
- Ayman Safiah – Arab-Palestinian dancer

== See also ==
- Abu Ayman (disambiguation)
- Aiman
