= Weghat Nazar =

Arabic monthly magazine

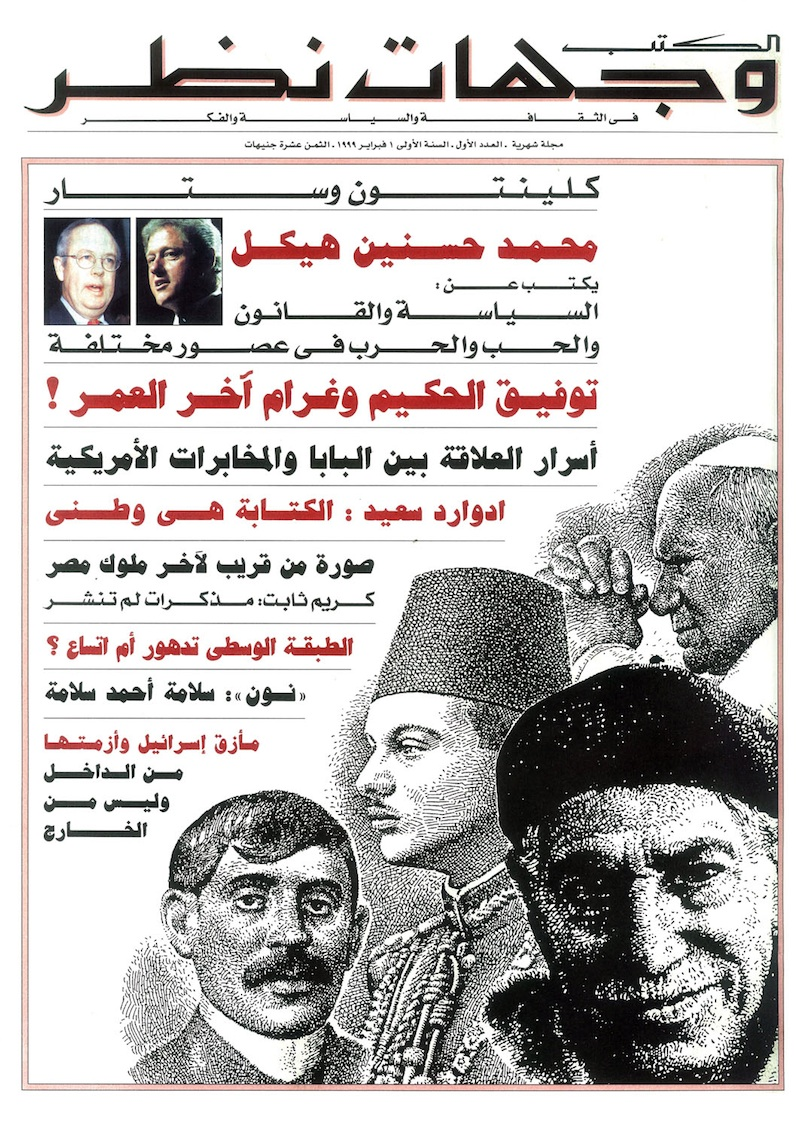
- First Issue, February 1999
- Editor-in-Chief: Ayman Al-Sayyad
- Categories: Literary magazine Cultural magazine
- Frequency: Monthly
- Publisher: Egyptian Company for International and Arabic Publishing
- First issue: 1 February 1999; 27 years ago
- Country: Egypt
- Based in: Cairo
- Language: Arabic

Weghat Nazar (Arabic: وجهات نظر) is an Arabic monthly magazine that features essays and book reviews on politics, culture, literature, and current affairs. The publication, whose name in Arabic means ‘points of views,’ was inspired by its editors’ vision that the only answer to difference in opinions is dialogue, and that dialogue is an exchange of ‘points of views.’

== History ==
=== The periodical ===
Weghat Nazar was founded in 1999 by leading Egyptian journalist Mohamed Hassanein Heikal, and published by Ibrahim El Moallem Chairman of Dar El Shorouk publishing house, with journalist and writer Salama Ahmed Salama as its first editor-in-chief, later succeeded by Ayman Al-Sayyad. The idea was inspired by what the editors felt is a lack of intellectual space for deep, thoughtful and meaningful dialogue in the Arab region, in a media environment filled with noise, and ideological warfare. As part of its mission to be a window for Arabic readers to global thought, in addition to original contributions, the periodical routinely published translations for a selection of articles from fellow literary journals including The New York Review of Books, The New Yorker, London Review of Books, The Atlantic Monthly and Harper's Magazine

Since its first edition, Weghat Nazar received wide popularity amongst thought leaders, academics and policy makers in the Arab region, as well as those with interest in the region. The periodical quickly became known as the leading literary-intellectual magazine in the Arabic language, and for its layout and covers illustrated by renowned Egyptian artist Helmi El Touni.Since the first edition, Heikal remained closely involved with the editorial process, in addition to writing the periodical’s main feature, until his retirement in 2003. Later, the periodical became associated with the name of its editor Ayman Al-Sayyad, also independently known for his efforts in reconciliation and transitional justice initiatives in the region.

=== Weghat Nazar Dialogues ===
In 2009, Ayman Al-Sayyad, editor of Weghat Nazar started Weghat Nazar Dialogues a culture initiative that which conducts seminars, consultations and public dialogues on key political and development issues in the region. The Dialogues began with a partnership with the UNDP, and its events’ co-hosts/ participants have so far included Bibliotheca Alexandria, National Aeronautics and Space Administration (NASA), Al-Jazeera Center for Studies, and the Georgetown University Center for International and Regional Studies.

== Notable contributors ==
Notable contributors to Weghat Nazar have included Arabic and non-Arabic authors alike, including but not limited to:

- Alain Gresh
- Ahmed Zewail
- Alistair Horne
- Ayman Al-Sayyad
- Ismail Serageldin
- Bahaa Taher
- Tharwat Okasha
- Gaber Asfour
- Galal Amin
- Gamal El-Ghitani
- Joseph Massad
- John Esposito
- John Waterbury
- Joel Beinin
- Hazem Al Beblawi
- Hassan Hanafi
- Khairy Shalaby
- Denys Johnson-Davies
- Raouf Abbas
- Ratiba El-Hefny
- Rushdi Said
- Rashid Khalidi
- Radwa Ashour
- Stephen Walt
- Sahar Khalifeh
- Salama Ahmed Salama
- Salman Abu Sitta
- Samha El-Kholy
- Shawqi Daif
- Sadiq Jalal al-Azm
- Sonallah Ibrahim
- Tarek El-Bishry
- Tariq Ramadan

== See also ==
- List of magazines in Egypt
