= Jourdan =

Jourdan may refer to:

== First name ==
- Jourdan Bobbish (1994–2012), prominent American murder victim
- Jourdan Dunn (born 1990), British fashion model
- Jourdan Lewis (born 1995), American football player
- Jourdan Thibodeaux (born 1986), American Cajun music fiddler and singer
- Jourdan Urbach (born 1991), American retired violinist

== Surname ==
- Adolphe Jourdan, French painter (1825-1889)
- Camila Jourdan (born 1980), Brazilian philosopher
- Carolyn Jourdan, American author
- Claude Jourdan (1803–1873), French zoologist and paleontologist
- David W. Jourdan (born 1954), American businessman
- Jean-Baptiste Jourdan (1762–1833), French army commander
- Louis Jourdan (1921–2015), French actor
- Phil Jourdan (born 1987), French writer
- Philippe Jourdan (born 1960), Estonian bishop of the Catholic Church
- Pierre Jourdan (actor) (1932–2007), French actor and director
- René Jourdan (1943–2025), French long-distance runner
- Talen Jourdan (born 1999), American wheelchair basketball player

== See also ==
- Jordan (disambiguation)
