= Usama ibn Zayd =

Companion (Sahabi) of Muhammad

Commander of the Prophet Muhammad's Last Army (Appointed) Usāma ibn Zayd أُسَامَة بن زَيْد
- Born: c. 615–618; Mecca, Hejaz, Arabia
- Died: c. 680; Medina, Umayyad Caliphate
- Spouse: Fatima bint Qays
- Relatives: Zayd ibn Harithah (father); Umm Ayman (mother); Ayman ibn Ubayd (half-brother); Banu Kalb (tribe); Muhammad (adoptive grandfather)
- Military career
- Rank: Military commander to Muhammad (632)
- Nicknames: Hibbu Rasulullah; Abu Muhammad
- Conflicts: Battle of Hunayn; Expedition of Usama bin Zayd

Usama ibn Zayd ibn Haritha al-Kalbi (Arabic: أسامة بن زيد بن حارثة الكلبي, romanized: ʾUsāma ibn Zayd ibn Ḥāritha al-Kalbī) was an early Muslim and companion of the Islamic prophet Muhammad.

He was the son of Zayd ibn Haritha, Muhammad's adopted son, and Umm Ayman, a servant of Muhammad.

Muhammad appointed Usama ibn Zayd as the commander of an expeditionary force which was to invade the region of Balqa in the Byzantine Empire to avenge the Battle of Mu'tah, in which Usama's father and Muhammad's adopted son, Zayd ibn Harithah, had been killed. This campaign was known as the Expedition of Usama bin Zayd. Usama's campaign was successful and his army was the first Muslim force to successfully invade Byzantine territory, thus paving the way for the subsequent Muslim conquest of the Levant and Muslim conquest of Egypt.

== Background and early life ==
Usama was the son of Barakah (Umm Ayman), an Abyssinian, and her second husband, Zayd ibn Haritha. His parents were married "after Islam" and Usama was born before Hijrah.

Usama's mother, Umm Ayman served as a slave in the household of Muhammad's parents, Abdullah ibn Abdul-Muttalib and Aminah bint Wahb. She became Muhammad's slave after the death of Aminah. Following Aminah's death in Al-Abwa, Barakah looked after Muhammad, and moved with him to the household of his grandfather Abdul-Muttalib ibn Hashim in Mecca, where she served him during his childhood and afterwards, in his adulthood. When Muhammad married Khadija, he arranged for Barakah's freedom and marriage to a Khazrajite companion named Ubayd ibn Zayd, who was her first husband. Through this marriage, Usama's half brother, Ayman ibn Ubayd was born, and thus she was known as "Umm Ayman" ("Mother of Ayman").

Usama's father, Zayd ibn Haritha, was a companion and adopted son of Muhammad. He is commonly regarded as the third person to have accepted Islam, after Muhammad's wife Khadija bint Khuwaylid, and Muhammad's cousin Ali ibn Abi Talib. He was an Arab of the Udhra branch of the Kalb tribe of Najd, central Arabia Zayd's mother, Suda bint Thaalaba, was from the Maan branch of the Tayy tribe.

As such, Usama was born into a family with strong connections to Muhammad and both his parents were prominent in the early Muslim community. His family migrated to Medina with Muhammad to escape the religious persecution of the Quraysh in Mecca.

Usama had a close relationship with Muhammad and he fought with Muhammad in the Battle of Hunayn. Ibn Kathir writes that according to Ibn Ishaq, Jabir ibn Abd Allah, who witnessed the battle, reported that the Muslim army were panicked by a surprise attack from the enemy and many men fled the battlefield. However, a group of Muhajirun stood firmly and defended Muhammad the battlefield. These men were Abu Bakr, Umar, Ali, Abbas ibn Abd al-Muttalib, Abu Sufyan ibn al-Harith, Fadl ibn Abbas, Rabi'ah ibn al-Harith, Usama ibn Zayd and Ayman ibn Ubayd. Usama's half-brother Ayman ibn Ubayd was killed that day whilst defending Muhammad.

== Expedition of Usama ibn Zayd ==
The Expedition of Usama bin Zayd was a military expedition of the early Muslim Caliphate led by Usama ibn Zayd that took place in June 632, in which Muslim forces raided Byzantine Syria.

After the Farewell Pilgrimage, Muhammad appointed Usama ibn Zayd as the commander of an expeditionary force which was to invade the region of Balqa in the Byzantine Empire. Muhammad commanded all the sahaba, except for his family, to go with Usama to Syria to avenge the Muslims’ defeat at the Battle of Mu'tah, in which Usama's father and Muhammad's adopted son, Zayd ibn Harithah, had been killed. Usama's leadership was initially rejected by some because of his young age at the time, however Muhammad dismissed these concerns.

In reference to this event, the Sahih al-Bukhari states that:

The Prophet appointed Usama as the commander of the troops (to be sent to Syria). The Muslims spoke about Usama (unfavorably). The Prophet said, "I have been informed that you spoke about Usama. (Let it be known that) he is the most beloved of all people to me" Sahih al-Bukhari, 5:59:744

However, soon after the expedition was dispatched, people stayed in Medina refusing to go under Usama's army and disobeyed the prophet The campaign was not reengaged until leadership of the community passed to Abu Bakr, who chose to honour Muhammad's wishes and reaffirmed Usama's command. Usama's campaign was successful and his army was the first Muslim force to invade and raid Byzantine territory successfully, thus paving the way for the subsequent Muslim conquest of the Levant and Muslim conquest of Egypt, both of which took place during Usama's lifetime.

== Later life ==
After the death of Muhammad, Usama settled in Wadi al-Qura, then later in Medina. He died in al-Jurf "at the end of the caliphate of Mu'awiyah", i.e., c.680.

== See also ==
- Sahabah
- Zayd ibn Harithah
- Ayman ibn Ubayd
- Umm Ayman
- List of non-Arab Sahabah
- Afro-Arabs
