= Jourda =

Jourda is a surname. Notable people with the surname include:

- Albert Jourda (1892–?), French footballer
- Françoise-Hélène Jourda (1955–2015), French architect
- Noël Jourda de Vaux (1705–1788), French nobleman and General

== See also ==
- Jourdan
