= Umm Ayman =

Companion (Sahabiyyah) of Muhammad

Baraka bint Thaʿlaba (Arabic: بَـرَكَـة بنت ثَعلَبَة), commonly known by her kunya Umm Ayman (Arabic: أمّ أيمن), was an early Muslim and one of the disciples (Sahaba) of the Islamic prophet Muhammad.

She was an Abyssinian slave of Muhammad's parents, Abdullah ibn Abd al-Muttalib and Aminah bint Wahb. Following the death of Aminah, Baraka helped to raise Muhammad in the household of his grandfather, Abd Al-Muttalib ibn Hashim. He saw her as a motherly figure. Muhammad later freed her from slavery, but she continued to serve Muhammad and his family. She was an early convert to Islam, and was present at the important battles of Uhud and Khaybar.

Following her freedom, Muhammad also arranged her marriage, first to Ubayd ibn Zayd of the Banu Khazraj, with whom she had a son, Ayman ibn Ubayd, giving her the kunya Umm Ayman (meaning mother of Ayman). She was later married to the adopted son of Muhammad, Zayd ibn Harithah. Her son with Zayd, Usama ibn Zayd, served as a commander in the early Muslim army and led the Expedition of Usama bin Zayd into the Byzantine Empire.

== Background ==
Baraka was the daughter of Tha'laba bin Amr, an Abyssinian. She served as a slave in the household of Abdullah ibn Abd al-Muttalib and Aminah bint Wahb. She cared for Muhammad during infancy and childhood, after the death of Aminah.

== Muhammad's childhood ==
Following Aminah's death in Al-Abwa, Baraka looked after Muhammad, and moved with him to the household of his grandfather in Mecca, where she served him during his childhood and afterwards, in his adulthood.

According to Ibn Kathir, Abd al-Muttalib, Muhammad's paternal grandfather, had told Baraka not to neglect his grandson, especially as many of the Ahl al-Kiṫâb (Arabic: أَهـل الـكِـتـاب, People of the Book) predicted that he would be a prophet of the nation.

== Marriages and children ==
When Muhammad married Khadija, he arranged for Baraka's freedom and marriage to a Khazrajite companion named Ubayd ibn Zayd. Through this marriage, Baraka bore a son named Ayman, and thus she was known as "Umm Ayman" ("Mother of Ayman"). Ayman ibn Ubayd was later killed fighting in the Battle of Hunayn.

Muhammad's adopted son Zayd ibn Harithah later married Baraka. They had a son named Usama who appointed as an army leader by Muhammad and led the successful Expedition of Usama bin Zayd into the Byzantine Empire.

== Migration ==
After Muhammad announced his Prophethood, Umm Ayman became one of his first followers. Later, she migrated to Medina.

== Participation in battles ==
Umm Ayman was present at the Battle of Uhud. She fetched water for the soldiers and helped treat the injured. She also accompanied Muhammad in the Battle of Khaybar.

In the battle of Uhud, many men ran away toward Medina after rumor of the death of Muhammad. Umm Ayman sprinkled dust on the face of some fugitives, gave them a spindle and told them: "give me your sword and [you] spin spindle." Then she went toward the battlefield along with several women. Subsequently, she was injured by an arrow which Hebban bin Araqa, an enemy soldier, shot at her.

== Relationships with other early Muslims ==
Muhammad was fond of Umm Ayman, even thinking of her as like a mother. Several hadiths describe Muhammad's esteem for her. He visited Umm Ayman at her house, and after him, Caliphs Abu Bakr and Umar did the same. In some hadith sources there is a heaven about the virtues of Umm Ayman. She is also praised in Shi'ite sources.

A few hadith have been narrated from her. Those such as Anas ibn Malik, Abu Yazid Madani and Hanash bin Abdullah San'any have narrated from her.

== Death ==
The exact date of Umm Ayman's death is not clear. Some have suggested that she died approximately five months after Muhammad's death. But according to ibn Sa'd, she was alive in the early days of the caliphate of Uthman.

== See also ==
- Bilal ibn Rabah
- Sahabah

== Bibliography ==
- Ibn al-Athir, Ali (1948). Usd al-ghaba fi ma'rifat al-sahaba. Cairo.
- Ibn Babawayh, Muhammad (1980). Amali. Beirut.
- Ibn Hajar Al-Asqalani, Ahmad (1909). Tahzib Al-Tahzib. Hyderabad Deccan.
- Ibn Sa`d, Mohammed. al-Tabaqat al-Kubra. Dar Sader.
- ibn Abd al-Birr, Yusuf (1960). al-Isti'ab, recherch by Ali Mohammad Bejavi. Cairo.
- Ibn Qutaybah, Abdullah (1969). al-Ma'arif, research by Therwat Akasheh. Cairo.
- ibn Kathir, Abdullah (1988). al-Bidayah wa al-Nihayah, research by Ali Shiri. Dar Ihya al-Turath al-Arabi.
- Ibn Majah, Muhammad (1981). Sunan. Istanbul.
- ibn Hanbal, Ahmad (1981). Musnad. Cairo.
- Baladhuri, Ahmad (1959). Ansab al Ashraf, research by Muhammad Hamidullah. Cairo.
- Al-Dhahabi, Ahmad (1986). Seir Alam Al-Nubala, research by Shu'aib al-Arnaou and others. Beirut.
- Zuhri, Abdullah (1981). al-maghzi al-nabawiyya, research by Soheil Zakar. Dar al-fikr.
- al-Tabarani, Sulayman (1981). Al-Mujam al-Kabir, research of Hamdi Abdul-Majid Salafi. Baghdad.
- al-Tabarsi (1966). Al-Ihtijaj, vol. 1. Dar ol-no'man.
- Al-Kulayni, Muhammad (1980). al-Kafi, Revised by Ali Akbar Ghaffariy. Beirut.
- ibn al-Hajjaj, Muslim (1980). Sahih, annotator: Muhammad Fuad 'Abd al-Baqi. Istanbul.
- Al-Waqidi, Muhammad (1966). al-Maghazi, research by Marsden, Johns. London.
- Mahallati, Zabihollah (1979). al-rayahin al-sharia. Hekmat.
