= Ayman Zohry =

Egyptian geographer

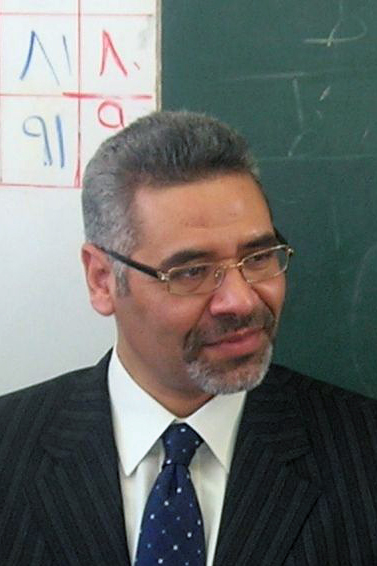
- Zohry in Cairo, 2009
- Born: June 7, 1964 (age 62); Souhag, Egypt
- Education: Ph.D.
- Alma mater: University of Sussex
- Website: www.zohry.com

Ayman Zohry (born June 7, 1964) is a demographer/geographer and expert on migration studies based in Cairo, Egypt. He was born in Sohag, Egypt. Zohry received his Ph.D. from the University of Sussex in 2002. He is a leading researcher in the field of migration studies in Egypt with a special focus on irregular migration.

Dr. Zohry has about 20 years of experience in the field of population studies and migration research. He started his career working as a junior demographer at the National Population Council (Egypt) from 1987 until joining the Cairo Demographic Center in 1992 to study for two diplomas in demography and population and development, then a Master of Philosophy in Demography in 1995 with specialization in family planning programs and population policies. While studying at CDC he worked as a lecturer assistant, lecturer, and trainer. He was also a lecturer in the United Nations-sponsored Population and Development Program also. He carried out a lot of studies in his field of specialization and he used an array of Demographic and Health Surveys for countries of Africa and Asia. He moved then to work in a UNFPA-funded project in the field of strengthening NGOs working in the field of population. In 1997 he joined the US Naval Medical Research Unit in Cairo (NAMRU-3), Egypt as a data analyst working in the field of medical demography and infant and child diseases. In 1999 he joined a project implemented by the Academy for Educational Development (AED), a United States organization and he used to work as the director of Monitoring and Evaluation division.

In the last few years he worked as a visiting professor at American University of Beirut (AUB), American University in Cairo (AUB), and The Danish Institute for International Studies. In addition, he carried out consulting work in the fields of demography, education, labor force, and migration for the International Organization for Migration (IOM), World Bank, Arab League, United Nations Economic and Social Commission for Western Asia, European Union, Academy for Educational Development, United States Agency of International Development (USAID), and many other national, regional, and international organizations. Currently, Dr. Zohry's work focuses on migration with special emphasis on illegal migration of Egyptian youth to Europe. Most of Dr. Zohry's published work is available for download at his website. His recent book (in Arabic) Insights into Egyptian Society was published in Cairo in 2006.

== Fellowships, Scholarships, Grants, and Awards ==
- Listed in "Who's Who in the World, 2014," Marquis, Wilmette, Illinois.
- Listed in "Who's Who in the World, 2006," Marquis, Wilmette, Illinois.
- Fellow, Academic Session 425, Salzburg Seminar: Challenges of European Integration and Expansion. Salzburg, Austria, Jun 29 - Jul 4, 2005.
- Fellow, Academic Session 409, Salzburg Seminar: Migration, Race, and Ethnicity in Europe, Salzburg, Austria, Jun 17 - Jun 24, 2003.
- University of Sussex Alumni Consul in Egypt, 2002–Present
- Middle East Awards in the Social Sciences (MEAwards), Awardee, 2000-2001.
- Research Fellow, Sussex Center for Migration Research (SCMR), University of Sussex, 1999-2002.

== Publications ==
=== Research papers published in peer-reviewed journals ===
- Zohry, A. (2015) "International Migration: A Theoretical Overview," Democracy, (61): 46-53 (in Arabic).
- Zohry, A. (2013) "Human Mobility: Migrant Communities and Political Change in the Home Countries," Al-Siyassa Al-Dawliya, (192) (in Arabic).
- Zohry, A. (2012) "Migration Networks: Human Mobility and International Relations in the Arab Region," Al-Siyassa Al-Dawliya, (189): 78-81 (in Arabic).
- Zohry, A. (2012) "The Seven Billion: The Economic and Political Ramifications of the Population Cause," Al-Siyassa Al-Dawliya, (187): 100-104 (in Arabic).
- Zohry, A. (2011) "Population movements and the non-traditional security in the Arab region," Al-Siyassa Al-Dawliya, (186): 23-28 (in Arabic).
- Zohry, A. (2008) "Levels and determinants of infant and child mortality in Djibouti". Arab Family Health and Population. 1(1):1-35 (in Arabic).
- Zohry, A. (2007). "Egyptian Irregular Migration to Europe". Migration Letters. 4 (1): 53–63. doi:10.33182/ml.v4i1.210.
- Habib, R.; Zohry, A.; Nuwayhid, I.; Najdi, F. (2006). "Older adults in the division of domestic labor in communities on the outskirts of Beirut". European Journal of Ageing. 3 (3): 137–145. doi:10.1007/s10433-006-0031-3. PMC 1872049. PMID 17515949.
- Zohry, A. (2006). "Immigration to Egypt". Journal of Immigrant and Refugee Studies. 4 (3): 33–54. doi:10.1300/J500v04n03_02.
- Zohry, A. (2003) "The place of Egypt in the regional migration system as a receiving country." Revue Européenne des Migrations Internationales (REMI). 19(3):129-149.
- Zohry, A. (2003). "Nutritional habits of unskilled rural laborers in Cairo". Nutritional Anthropology. 26: 19–22.
- Warschauer, M.; El-Said, G.; Zohry, A. (2002) “Language Choice Online: Globalization and Identity in Egypt”. Journal of Computer-Mediated Communication (JCMC). 7(4).
- Khalifa, MA; Abdel Moneim, A; Zohry, A. G. (1994). "The Impact of Socioeconomic Setting and Program Effort on Contraceptive Prevalence in the Egyptian Governorates". The Egyptian Population and Family Planning Review. 28 (2): 82–103. PMID 12291981.
- Sakani, O; Zohry, AG (1994). "Socioeconomic and Demographic Factors Affecting School Enrollment in Egypt". The Egyptian Population and Family Planning Review. 28 (2): 116–138. PMID 12291977.

=== Working papers and chapters in research monographs ===
- Zohry, A. (2016) “Return Migrants”, in S. Farid (ed.) Egypt Household International Migration Survey 2013, Central Agency for Public Mobilization and Statistics (CAPMAS), Cairo, Pp: 75-127.
- Zohry, A. (2014) “Migration and Development in Egypt”, in M. Bommes, H. Fassmann & W. Sievers (eds.) Migration between the Middle East, North Africa and Europe Past Developments, Current Status and Future Potentials, IMISCOE Research, Amsterdam University Press, Pp: 75-98.
- Megahed, N., Abdellah, A., & Zohry, A. (2012) “The Quest for Educational reform in Egypt”, in C. Aceda, D. Adams & S. Popa (eds.) Quality and Qualities: Tensions in Education Reform. Rotterdam: Sense Publishers.
- Zohry, A. (2011) “A Proposed Framework for the Study of Illegal Migration,” Working Paper No. 1, Egyptian Society for Migration Studies (EGYMIG).
- Zohry, A. (2010) “Immigration to Egypt”, in Segal, U.A., Mayadas, N.S., & Elliott, D. (eds), Immigration Worldwide: Policies, Practices, and Trends, Oxford University Press.
- Zohry, A. (2008) “Migration Policies in the Eastern Mediterranean Region: The Cases of Egypt, Jordan and Syria”, in Ayşe GÜNEŞ-AYATA (editor), Challenges of Global Migration: EU and Its Neighbourhood, Center for Black Sea and Central Asia (KORA) and Middle East Technical University (METU), Pp: 77-92.
- Ginsburg, M., Megahed, N., Abdellah, A., & Zohry, A. (2009) “Promoting active-learning pedagogies in Egypt”, in N. Popov, C. Wolhuter, C. Heller & M. Kysilka (eds.) Comparative Education and Teacher Training (volume 6). Sofia: Bureau for Educational Services and the Bulgarian Comparative Education Society.
- Warschauer, M.; El-Said, G.; Zohry, A. (2007) “Language Choice Online: Globalization and Identity in Egypt” In: Brenda Danet and Susan C. Herring (eds)The Multilingual Internet: Language, Culture, and Communication Online, Oxford University Press, Pp: 303-318.
- Zohry, A. (2007) “Why Upper Egyptians Migrate to Cairo”, Al-Ahram Strategic File, No. 155, Al-Ahram Center for Political and Strategic Studies, Cairo (in Arabic).
- Zohry, A. (2006) “Egyptian Youth and the European Eldorado: Journeys of Hope and Despair”, Working Paper No. 18, Danish Institute for International Studies (DIIS), Copenhagen.
- Zohry, A. (2006) “Immigration to Egypt”, in Segal, U.A., Mayadas, N.S., & Elliott, D. (eds), Immigration Worldwide, Haworth Press, New York.
- Zohry, A. (2005) "Migration Without Borders: North Africa as a reserve of cheap labour for Europe," Migration Without Borders Series, UNESCO, Paris.
- Warschauer, M.; El-Said, G.; Zohry, A. “Language Choice Online: Globalization and Identity in Egypt”. In: Fred E. Jandt (editor): Intercultural Communication: A Global Reader. Sage Publications, ISBN 0-7619-2899-5.
- Zohry, A. G.; El-Said, G. R. “Arab Demographers’ Use of Computer and Internet Resources: Results of an Online Survey". Working Papers Series, No. 1, 2000. 20 pp. Egypt Population Research Center (egypop). Cairo, November 2000.
- Zohry, A. G. "The plateau effect of the family planning program in Egypt". Cairo Demographic Center, Research Monograph Series No. 27, 1998.
- Zohry, A. G. “Determinants of Contraceptive Switching Behavior in Egypt”. In: Makhlouf H; Amin SZ; Moreland RS, (eds.) Studies in Contraceptive Use in Egypt: Eight Studies of the 1992 Egypt Demographic and Health Survey, Cairo Demographic Center and Egypt National Population Council, January 1997. Re-Published in: Population Studies, Vol. 16 No. 81, PP 25–54, 1998.
- Zohry, A. G. "Population policies and family planning program in Egypt: evolution and performance". Cairo Demographic Center, Research Monograph Series No. 26, 1997.
- Zohry, A. G., “Reproductive Intentions and Future Fertility in Egypt”. Cairo Demographic Center, Research Monograph Series No. 25, PP. 255–68, 1996.
- Zohry, A. G., “Attitudes of Egyptian Women Toward Female Circumcision in Egypt”. Cairo Demographic Center, Research Monograph Series No. 25, 1996.
- Zohry, A. G., “Features of Contraceptive Switching Behavior in Egypt”. Cairo Demographic Center, Research Monograph Series No. 25, 1996.
- Zohry, A. G. “Excess Births Due to Unwanted Fertility in Egypt”. Cairo Demographic Center, Research Monograph Series No. 24, 1995.
- Bahobaishi N; Zohry, A. G. “Fertility in Yemen: An Analysis of the Proximate Determinants”. Cairo Demographic Center, Research Monograph Series No. 24, 1995.
- Zohry, A. G.; Bean, Lee L. "Infant Mortality and Health Care in the Gulf Region". Cairo Demographic Center, Research Monograph Series No. 24, 1995.
- Bean, Lee L.; Zohry, A. G. "Marriage and fertility in the Gulf region: the impact of pro-family, pro-natal policies" CDC Working Paper, No. 36, 1994. 37 pp. Cairo Demographic Center: Cairo.
- Zohry, A. G. “Determinants of Fertility in Egypt: A Supply Demand Approach”. Cairo Demographic Center, Research Monograph Series No. 23, 1994.
- Zohry, A. G. “Labor Force Profile in Rural Upper Egypt versus Rural Lower Egypt”. Cairo Demographic Center, Research Monograph Series No. 22, 1993.

=== Books, handbooks, and reports (Partial List) ===
- Zohry, A. [editor] (2014) Regional Report on Arab International Migration: Migration and Development 2014, League of Arab States (LAS), Cairo. (in Arabic)
- Zohry, A. (Editor) (2013) Development Policy Implications of Age-Structural Transitions in the Arab Countries, Population and Development Report, Issue No. 6, UN-ESCWA, United Nations, New York.
- Zohry, A. (2013) Trafficking of Women and Children in the Arab Region: A Regional Perspective, United Nations Economic and Social Commission for Western Asia, United Nations, New York.
- Zohry, A. (2011), “Socio-cultural Remittances: The case of Egypt.” In Cassani, B. and F. Mazzarelli (Eds) Education and Research without Borders: International Forum Proceedings: Rome, 12–13 May 2010, La Sapienza, Rome.
- Zohry, A. (2010) The Workers' Sponsor [Al-Kafeel!], Citizens For Development Foundation, Cairo.(in Arabic)
- Zohry, A. (2010) "A Study on the Dynamics of the Egyptian Diaspora: Strengthening Development Linkages ". International Organization for Migration.
- Zohry, A. (2009)"The Migratory Patterns of Egyptians in Italy and France ". CARIM Research Report no. 2009/17. The Euro-Mediterranean Consortium for Applied Research on International Migration (CARIM), European University Institute, Florence.
- Zohry, A. (2007) The Danish Experience, [Attajrouba Addanmarkiya] Cairo (in Arabic)
- Zohry, A. (2006) Insights into Egyptian Society, [Daftar Ahwāl Almogtama’ Al-Masri] Cairo (in Arabic)
- Zohry, A. (2006) Attitudes of Egyptian Youth Towards Migration to Europe 2006. International Organization for Migration (IOM), Italia Cooperation and Ministry of Manpower and Emigration, Cairo.
- Zohry, A. (2005) Assessment of Data Quality of the Arab Family Health Surveys. Pan Arab Project for Family Health (PAPFAM), League of Arab States, Cairo.
- Zohry, A. (2004) "Interrelationships between internal and international migration in Egypt: a pilot study," Research Reports Series, Development Research Center on Migration, Globalization, and Poverty, University of Sussex.
- Zohry, A. and Harrell-Bond, B. (2003) "Contemporary Egyptian migration: an overview of voluntary and forced migration". Country Background Papers (WP-C3), Development Research Center on Migration, Globalization, and Poverty, University of Sussex.
- Zohry, A. (2003) Contemporary Egyptian Migration 2003. International Organization for Migration (IOM), Italia Cooperation and Ministry of Manpower and Emigration, Cairo.
- Melnyk, A; Zohry, A; El-Said, G; Burch, R. (2003) Monitoring and Evaluation Handbook: Assuring Quality in Strategic Training Programs. Academy for Educational Development (AED).
- Hassan SS; Zohry, A. G. (1994) The Annual Statistical Report on the Status of Arab Child, 1994. The Arab Council for Childhood and Development, Cairo, 1995. (in Arabic)

=== Creative Writing ===
- Zohry, A. (2016) Children's Works, [Leab Eial], Autobiography, Cairo (in Arabic).
- Zohry, A. (2016) Superstitions, [Takhareef], Cynical Literature, Cairo (in Arabic).
- Zohry, A. (2015) Flashback, [Rajaa Assada], Novel, Cairo (in Arabic).
- Zohry, A. (2014) The Facebookies, [Al-Faisbokkyiat], Essays, Cairo (in Arabic).
- Zohry, A. (2014) Lexicon of Popular Coffee Shop Terms, [Mo’jam Mustalahaat Al-Makahi Ashaabyia], Cairo (in Arabic).
- Zohry, A. (2010) Communications and the Society in Egypt, [Al-Ettessalate wal-Mojtamaa fi Masr], Essays, Cairo (in Arabic).
- Zohry, A. (2008) The Mediterranean Sea, [Bahrelroom], The first Egyptian novel on illegal migration, Cairo (in Arabic)
- Zohry, A. (2007) The Danish Experience, [Attajrouba Addanmarkiya] Travel Literature, Cairo (in Arabic)
- Zohry, A. (2006) Insights into Egyptian Society, [Daftar Ahwāl Almogtama’ Al-Masri] Essays, Cairo (in Arabic).

=== Newspaper Articles ===
- Zohry, A. “Top 10 Egyptian Migration Issues of 2011", Al-Wafd Newspaper, 01-01-2012. (in Arabic)
- Zohry, A. “The View from Abroad", An article about remittances of Egyptians abroad, Business Today Egypt, December 2011.
- Zohry, A. “Voices of Egyptians abroad: Will they change the rules of the game?", Al-Wafd Newspaper, 15-11-2011. (in Arabic)
- Zohry, A. “To vote or note to vote: the dilemma of Egyptians Abroad", The Daily News Egypt, 13-10-2011.
- Zohry, A. “The Egyptian Labor Between the Kafeel System and the Recruitment Companies", [Al-emala Al-Masryia baina nezam Al-Kafeel we Sharekaat Al-Tawzeef]Al-Ahram Newspaper, 10-05-2010. (in Arabic)
- Zohry, A. “The International Migrants Day", [Al-Yaoum Al-Dawli Lel-Mohajereen]Al-Wafd Newspaper, 20-12-2009. (in Arabic)
- Zohry, A. “In the International Migrants Day", [Fil-Yaoum Al-Dawli Lel-Mohajereen]Al-Quds Al-Arabi Newspaper, 18-12-2009. (in Arabic)
- Zohry, A. “About the International Migrants Day", [Hawl Al-Yaoum Al-Dawli Lel-Mohajereen]Al-Shorouk Newspaper, 17-12-2009. (in Arabic)
- Zohry, A. “Dubai and the Gloaters", [Dubai wal-Shametoun]Al-Quds Al-Arabi Newspaper, 03-12-2009. (in Arabic)
- Zohry, A. “Humanity's Real Olympics", [Al-Oulembiad al-Haqiqi le-Basharyia] Al-Quds Al-Arabi Newspaper, 10-10-2009. (in Arabic)
- Zohry, A. “Family Planning .. A Step Backward", Al-Wafd Newspaper, 27-09-2009. (in Arabic)
- Zohry, A. “Towards a National Migration Council [in Egypt]", Rosalyousef Newspaper, 12-12-2007, issue no. 729, Cairo. (in Arabic)
- Zohry, A. “Announcing Cairo as a closed City II", Al-Ahram Newspaper, 23-09-2007, issue no. 44120, Cairo. (in Arabic).
- Zohry, A. “Beyond the Maids' crisis: Towards a National Migration Policy", The Daily Star Egypt, distributed with the International Herald Tribune, 12-06-2007, Cairo.
- Zohry, A. “The Returnees from Libya", Al-Wafd Newspaper, 14-03-2007, issue no. 6252, Cairo. (in Arabic)
- Zohry, A. “The Crisis of Egyptian Labor Migrants in Libya", Al-Ahaly Newspaper, 14-02-2007, issue no. 1314, Cairo. (in Arabic)
- Zohry, A. "Sheikh Zaki Badawi .. The end of the moderate voice of Islam in Europe", Al-Masry Al-Youm Newspaper, 12-02-2006, issue no. 609, Cairo. (in Arabic)
- Zohry, A. “Egypt, refuge, and refugees”, Al-Wafd Newspaper, 03-02-2006, Cairo
- Zohry, A. "Yes, Egypt witnesses an overpopulation problem", Assafir Newspaper, 26-06-2004, issue no. 9828, Beirut. (in Arabic)
- Zohry, A. "From Upper Egypt to international Academy", Al-hayat Newspaper, 18-03-2003, issue no. 14603, London. (Biography)
- Zohry, A. “Announcing Cairo as a closed City", Al-Ahram Newspaper, 15-09-2002, issue no. 42286, Cairo. (in Arabic)

=== Conference presentations (Partial List) ===
- Zohry, A. (2016) “The Demography of Arab Migration at the Time of the Massive Population Mobility,” The Seventeenth Meeting of the Heads of the National Population Councils and Committees in the Arab Region, League of Arab States, UNFPA, and ESCWA, 8–9 November 2016, Sharm el Sheikh, Egypt (Invited).
- Zohry, A. (2016) “Migration and Health: The Case of Syrians in Egypt,” The Netherlands-Flemish Institute in Cairo (NVIC), 20 October 2016 (Invited).
- Zohry, A. (2016) “The Migration Crisis in the Mediterranean: The case of Syrian Refugees and Internally Displaced Population,” Women Gathering for Change: Envisioning Ways to Create A Healthier Future Conference, Library of Alexandria, Alexandria, 16–18 March 2016 (Invited).
- Zohry, A. (2016) “International Migration Statistics in the Arab Region: Challenges and Opportunities,” Fifth International Scientific Conference of Arab Statisticians, Arab Statisticians Union, Cairo, 9–10 February 2016 (Invited).
- Zohry, A. (2015) “Egyptian Migration: Trends, Figures, and Current Challenges,” World Statistics Day 2015, Central Agency for Public Mobilization and Statistics (CAPMAS), Cairo, 20 October 2015.
- Zohry, A. (2015) “Demographic Dimensions of Armed Conflicts in the Arab Region,” Summer School for Students of Political Science and Media Departments of the Egyptian Universities, August–September 2015, Al-Ahram Center for Political and Strategic Studies (ACPSS) and The Regional Center for Strategic Studies (RCSS), Cairo, 23 August 2015 (in Arabic).
- Zohry, A. (2014) “Inequalities and Rural Exodus,” Workshop on The left behind: Rural Communities in Times of Transitions, The Foundation for South-North Mediterranean, Library of Alexandria, and The Global Forum for Agricultural Research, Alexandria, 8–9 November 2014.
- Zohry, A. (2014) “The Effects of Labor Mobility Issues on the Inter-Arab Relations,” Panel Discussion of Mutual Vulnerability, The Regional Center for Strategic Studies (RCSS), Cairo, 7 May 2014.
- Zohry, A. (2013) "Assessment of International Migration in the Arab Region," Background paper prepared for the "Regional Conference on Population and Development in the Arab States: Development Challenges and Population Dynamics in a Changing Arab World," Cairo, 24–26 June.
- Zohry, A. (2011) "A Study on the Dynamics of the Egyptian Diaspora: Strengthening Development Linkages," Center for Migration and Refugee Studies (CMRS), American University in Cairo, 16 November 2011.
- Zohry, A. (2010), "Population Movements in Arab Region From the Perspective of Non-Traditional Security: Illegal Migration, Wide Range Population Movements, and Urban Areas Problems,” Non-Traditional Security Project - Al-Ahram Center for Political and Strategic Studies (ACPSS), 30 November 2010.
- Zohry, A. (2010) "Migration and Identity in the Arab Gulf Countries: The case of the UAE," Gulf Research Meeting 2010, University of Cambridge, 7–10 July 2010.
- Zohry, A. (2010) "Migration and the Family in the Middle East and North Africa". Conference on "Empowerment of the Family in the Modern World: Challenges & Promises Ahead," Doha International Institute for Family Studies and Development (DIFSD), Qatar Foundation, Doha, 27–28 January. 2010
- Zohry, A. (2009) "The Development Impact of Internal Migration: Findings from Egypt". The 26th International Conference on Population, IUSSP, Marrakech, 27 Sep-2 Oct. 2009
- Zohry, A. (2009) Strategies of Coping and Patterns of Accommodation of Irregular Egyptian Migrants in Europe, Irregular Migration Conference, Partners In Development, Cairo 9–10 May.
- Zohry, A. (2009) The Demography of Arab Youth: Current Situation and Future Trends, Expert Group Meeting on Reinforcing Social Equity: Integrating Youth in the Development Process, UN-ESCWA and Family Development Foundation, Abu Dhabi, 29–31 March 2009. (In Arabic).
- Zohry, A. (2007) Integrating Population Variables into Development Planning in the Arab Region, Expert Group Meeting on "Integrating Population Variables into Development Planning in the Arab Region," The United Nations Economic and Social Commission for Western Asia, Amman, Jordan, 3–4 April 2007.
- Zohry, A. Egyptian Irregular Migration to Europe, The Third International Population Geographies Conference, European Association for Population Studies (EAPS), University of Liverpool, Liverpool, June 21–24, 2006.
- Zohry, A. Who Migrates Internally, Internationally, & Who Stays Behind in Egypt?, European Population Conference 2006, University of Liverpool, Liverpool, June 19–21, 2006.
- Zohry, A. Developmentalizing the Diaspora : African Refugees in Cairo, Fourth International Workshop on Diaspora, Development and Conflict: The Impacts of Transnational Activities, Danish Institute for International Studies (DIIS), Bornholm, May 7–9, 2006.
- Zohry, A. Migration and the Left-Behind Families: Findings from Rural Egypt, Seminar on “Gendering Migration in the Middle East: Migrants’ Presence and Absence,” Danish Institute for International Studies (DIIS), Copenhagen, May 4, 2006.
- Awad, A. & Zohry, A. The End of Egypt Population Growth in the 21st Century: Challenges and Aspirations, The 35th Annual Conference on Population and Development Issues: Current Situation & Aspirations, Cairo Demographic Center, Cairo 20–22 December 2005.
- Zohry, A. Cairo: A transit city for migrants and African Refugees, Colloque: Circulations migratoires et reconfigurations territoriales entre l’Afrique noire et l’Afrique du Nord, Centre d'études et de documentation économiques, juridiques et sociales (CEDEJ), Cairo 17–18 November 2005 (invited).
- Zohry, A. Computer-Mediated Communications as Tools for Professional Development: Demographers Without Borders as a Case Study, The 3rd Conference of Documentation and Electronic Archiving: Knowledge Investment and Management for Decision Support, United Nations Development Program (UNDP) and Dubai Municipality, Dubai 17–19 September 2005.
- Zohry, A. Armenians in Egypt, The 25th International Population Conference, The International Union for the Scientific Study of Population (IUSSP), Tours, France, 18–23 July 2005.
- Zohry, A. Integrating Population Variables in Development Planning, a keynote speech, National Conference on Population and Development, National Agency for Information and Documentation, Center for Economic Research, and The Academy for Graduate Studies, Tripoli, 21–22 November 2004 (invited).
- Zohry, A. Demographic Pressures in North Africa: causes and Consequences, The Euro-African Dialogue: Security Co-operation in Europe & North Africa, Royal United Service Institute for Defense Studies (London), 30–31 October 2002, Tripoli, Libya (invited). PPT
- Zohry, A. Unskilled Labor Migration from Upper Egypt to Cairo, Centre d'études et de documentation économiques, juridiques et sociales (CEDEJ), 22 October 2002, Cairo (invited). PPT
- Warschauer, M.; Zohry, A.; Refaat, G. Language and literacy online: A study of Egyptian internet users, The American Association for Applied Linguistics (AAAL) Conference, March 11–14, 2000, Vancouver, British Columbia.
- Zohry, A. G.; Hosam-el-Din, T. M. The Socioeconomic and Demographic Correlates of Female Circumcision in the Sudan. Paper presented in the 27th Annual Seminar on Population and Development, Cairo Demographic Center. Cairo 16–18 December 1997.
- Zohry, A. G. Reliability of Data on Fertility Intentions in Egypt. Paper presented in the 32nd Annual Conference on Statistics, Computer Sciences, and Operations Research, Institute of Statistical Studies and Research (ISSR), Cairo University. Cairo 13–15 December 1997.
- Zohry, A. G.; Gad AY, Demographic Profile of Gharbia and Souhag Governorates: An Intra-Governorate Analysis with GIS, Cairo Demographic Center, Paper presented in the 25th CDC Annual Seminar on Population and Development, December, 1995.
