= Ayman ibn Ubayd =

Companion (Sahabi) of Muhammad

- Born: 612 CE; Mecca, Arabia
- Died: 630 CE; Hunayn, Arabia
- Cause of death: Martyred in Battle of Hunayn while protecting Muhammad
- Known for: Being a Companion of Muhammad
- Children: al-Hajjaj ibn Ayman
- Parents: Ubayd ibn Zayd (father); Umm Ayman (mother)
- Relatives: Usama ibn Zayd (half-brother); Zayd ibn Harithah (step-father)

Ayman ibn ʿUbayd (Arabic: أَيْمَن ابْنِ عُبَیْد), or Ayman ibn Umm Ayman (Arabic: أَيْمَنَ ابْنِ أُمِّ أَيْمَنَ), was an early Muslim and companion of the Islamic prophet Muhammad.

He was the son of Barakah, who helped raise Muhammad, by her first husband Ubayd ibn Zayd of the Banu Khazraj tribe. Through his mother's second marriage to Zayd ibn Harithah, he was the half-brother of Usama ibn Zayd.

Ayman was killed fighting for the Muslim forces against Arab tribes in the Battle of Hunayn.

Ayman's son, al-Hajjaj ibn Ayman was born during the lifetime of Muhammad and ahadith (traditions) of Muhammad have been quoted from al-Hajjaj in Islamic literature, including in the Sahih al-Bukhari.

== Background ==
Ayman was the son of Barakah, an Abyssinian, who served as a slave in the household of the Prophet's parents, Abdullah ibn Abdul-Muttalib and Aminah bint Wahb. She became Muhammad's slave after the death of Aminah.

Following Aminah's death in Al-Abwa, Barakah looked after Muhammad, and moved with him to the household of his grandfather Abdul-Muttalib ibn Hashim in Mecca, where she served him during his childhood and afterwards, in his adulthood.

When Muhammad married Khadija, he arranged for Barakah's freedom and marriage to a Khazrajite companion named Ubayd ibn Zayd. Through this marriage, Ayman was born, and thus she was known as "Umm Ayman" ("Mother of Ayman").

Ayman's father, Ubayd ibn Zayd, was killed fighting in the Battle of Khaybar.

== Relationship with Muhammad ==
Early Islamic sources refer to Ayman as one of the Muhajirun, meaning that he migrated from Mecca to Medina in order to escape the religious persecution of the Quraysh in Mecca.

Like his mother, Ayman entered into the service of Muhammad and was in charge of his water jug with which he made ablution. He was also a shepherd and cared for eight goats owned by Muhammad.

A hadith is reported from him. He affirms that Muhammad only cut off the hand of a thief if the item stolen had the value of a shield, at minimum, and a shield in those days was equal to the value of one gold coin. This hadith is corroborated by a report in Sahih al-Bukhari.

== Death ==
Ayman was killed fighting for the Muslim army in the Battle of Hunayn.

Ibn Kathir writes that according to Ibn Ishaq, Jabir ibn Abd Allah, who witnessed the battle, reported that the Muslim army were panicked by a surprise attack from the enemy and many men fled the battlefield. However, a group of Muhajirun stood firm and defended Muhammad on the battlefield. These men were Abu Bakr, Umar, Ali, Abbas ibn Abd al-Muttalib, Abu Sufyan ibn al-Harith, Fadl ibn Abbas, Rabi'ah ibn al-Harith, Usama ibn Zayd and Ayman ibn Ubayd. Ayman was killed that day whilst defending Muhammad. For this reason, Ayman is considered a martyr in Islam.

After his martyrdom, Abbas ibn Abd al-Muttalib, Muhammad's uncle and one of those that fought with Ayman to defend Muhammad, composed a poem praising his steadfastness and bravery.

== See also ==
- Umm Ayman
- Usama ibn Zayd
- Bilal ibn Rabah
- List of non-Arab Sahabah
- Sahabah
- Afro-Arabs
- Ayman
- Aiman

== Bibliography ==
- Ibn Qutaybah, Abdullah (1969). al-Ma'arif, research by Therwat Akasheh. Cairo.
- Baladhuri, Ahmad (1959). Ansab al Ashraf, research by Muhammad Hamidullah. Cairo.
- Mahallati, Zabihollah (1979). al-rayahin al-sharia. Hekmat.
- Ibn Kathir, Abdullah (1988). al-Bidayah wa al-Nihayah, research by Ali Shiri. Dar Ihya al-Turath al-Arabi.
- Ibn Kathir, Abdullah (2000). The Battles of the Prophet. Dar al-Manarah.
- Ashitiyani, Husayn Malika (1990). Bilal of Africa. Islamic Seminary Publications.
