= Ayman Al-Sayyad =

Egyptian journalist, writer, magazine editor and political commentator

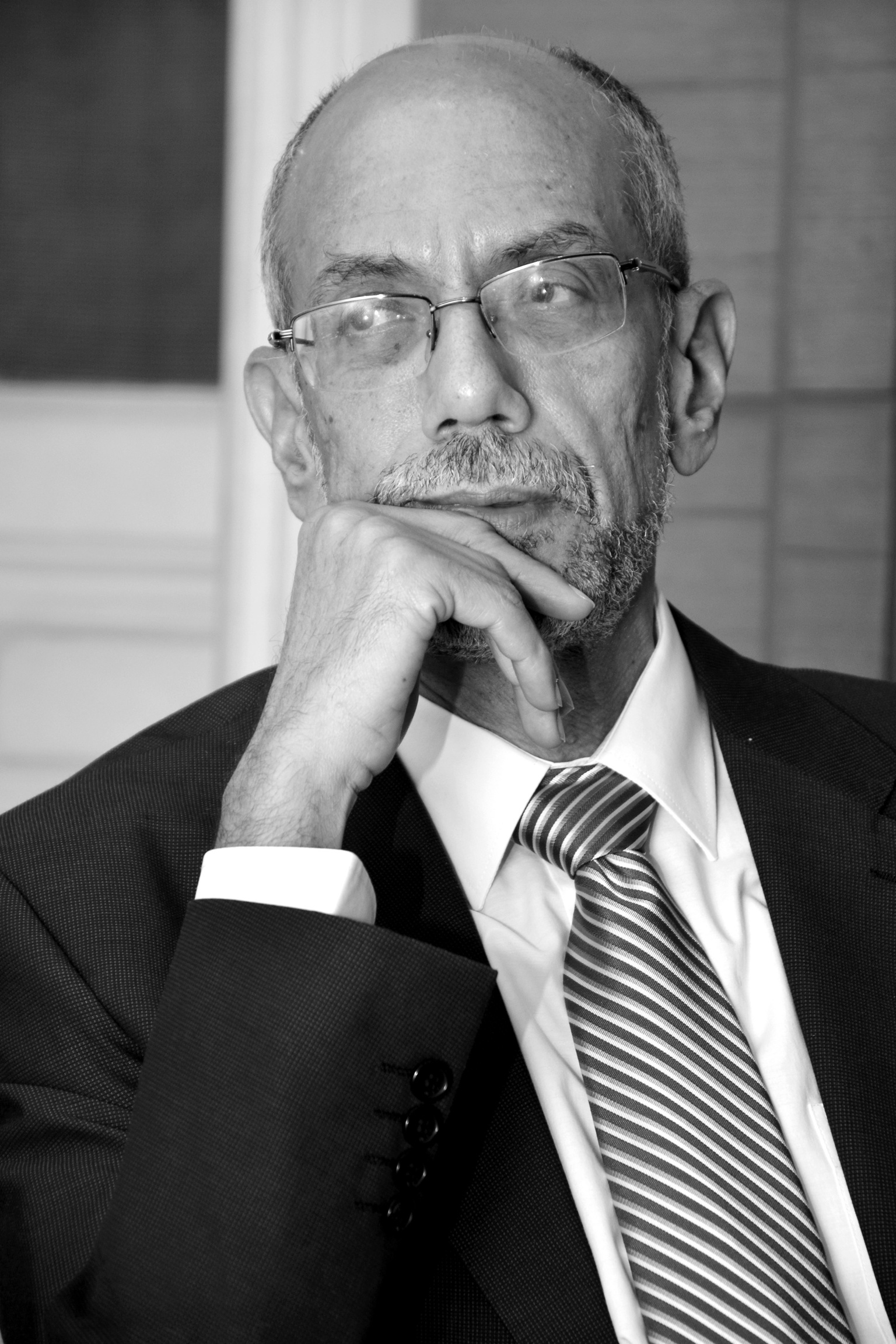
- Al-Sayyad (June 2012)
- Born: March 17, 1956 (age 70); Al-Santa, Al-Gharbiah, Egypt
- Education: Cairo University
- Occupations: Journalist, columnist
- Notable credit(s): "Weghat Nazar" Editor in Chief, Senior Advisor to the 1st elected Egyptian President (2012)
- Website: http://www.shorouknews.com/columns/ayman-al-sayyad

Ayman Al-Sayyad (Arabic: أيمن الصياد, born March 17, 1956) is an Egyptian journalist, writer, magazine editor and political commentator. He has been editor of Weghat Nazar Periodical since 2000, and has a weekly column in Al Shorouk Newspaper. In addition to his journalistic career, on August 27, 2012, Al-Sayyad was chosen as a senior advisor to the first elected Egyptian president after the January 25 uprising, Mohammed Morsi. He had earlier declined a ministerial post as Minister of Information, to keep his editorial independence.

Al-Sayyad resigned from the Presidential Advisory Board in protest over the constitutional draft of November 2012, which he considered a key failure of the Muslim Brotherhood to govern inclusively. He first announced his resignation through his Twitter account, and later wrote an open letter to then-president Morsi, which has created wide controversy after it ran in Al-Shorouk newspaper.

Following the 2011 uprisings in the Arab Middle East, Al-Sayyad devoted much of his writing and time to the issue of transitional justice and has been since considered an expert on the topic. He has provided consultancy in the field of transitional justice to the United Nations Development Programme (UNDP), and, in 2013, he was appointed by the Egyptian ministry of Justice as a member of the four-member-committee to work on transitional justice in Egypt.

== Education and early career ==
Al-Sayyad was born in the Nile Delta town, Al-Santa, Egypt, to which his father had moved to from the neighbouring village-town of Balkim in the mid 1940s. He later moved, first to Tanta as a college student to study medicine, and afterwards to Cairo, where he graduated as valedictorian from Cairo University with a BA in Broadcast Media Journalism in 1983. He began his journalistic career as a Cairo correspondent at the Pan-Arab London-based weekly magazine “Al-Majalla”, which he later served as its Cairo-Bureau Chief between 1991 and 1998. In 1995, Al-Sayyad was awarded The Ali & Othman Hafiz Award for Best Story in the Arab Press.

== Writing and photography ==
Despite the polarized political climate post Arab Spring in the region, Al-Sayyad's writing has been noted to have maintained a readership from opposite ends of the political spectrum. In his writing, lectures and interviews, he repeatedly argues that “there is too much McCarthyism in the media nowadays, while what is badly needed is fairness.” his interest in dialogue and open discussion has also been noted in his work as an editor. In 2009, he established Weghat Nazar Dialogues, a culture initiative that conducts seminars and consultations around key political and development issues in the region.

Al-Sayyad has further had an interest in photography since the beginning of his journalistic career. He studied photography, and began taking pictures himself for all journalistic features. In 1990, The UNICEF chose a series of his photographs for their 1990s campaign “Facts for Life.” The pictures were published in the regional version of the initiative's promotional book, which was one of UNICEF's most widely used publications in the nineties. Photography still plays a role in Al-Sayyad's writing, where his weekly essay invariably relies on a reading of what he considers the ‘photo of the week.’

== Organizations, honors and awards ==
In addition to his journalistic and writing career, Al-Sayyad has provided consultancy services to a number of media / cultural institutions, including the United Nations Development Programme (UNDP), the Arab Thought Foundation (ATF), Mohammed bin Rashid Al Maktoum Foundation (MBRF), and the International Center for Journalists (ICFJ). He is a board member of the Arab Journalism Award, a member of the advisory board for the UNDP's Arab Human Development Report (AHDR), and a member of the board of trustees for the Strategic Documents Center, Egypt.

Al-Sayyad has been the recipient of a number of journalist and photography awards, including the Ali & Othman Hafiz Award for Best Story in the Arab Press (1995), BMW's Award for Best Photo in Middle East Press (1989), Mustafa Amin Award for best press-photo on Maternity (1989), and The Kodak Bronze Medal for professional photographers (1987).
