= Mohamed Hassanein Heikal =

Egyptian journalist (1923-2016)

- محمد حسنين هيكل
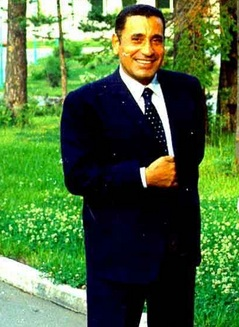
- Heikal in 1966
- Born: 23 September 1923; Qalyubiyya Governorate, Kingdom of Egypt
- Died: 17 February 2016 (aged 92); Cairo, Egypt
- Education: American University, Cairo
- Occupation: Journalist
- Years active: 1942–2003
- Spouse: Hedayt Elwi Taymour (1955–2016, his death)
- Children: 3 sons
- Family: Heikal

Mohamed Hassanein Heikal (Arabic: محمد حسنين هيكل; 23 September 1923 – 17 February 2016) was an Egyptian journalist. For 17 years (1957–1974), he was editor-in-chief of the Cairo newspaper Al-Ahram and was a commentator on Middle East affairs for more than 50 years.

Heikal articulated the thoughts of Egyptian president Gamal Abdel Nasser earlier in his career. He worked as a ghostwriter for Nasser and represented the ideology of pan-Arabism. Heikal was a member of the Central Committee of the Arab Socialist Union. He was appointed minister of information in April 1970 but resigned from government in 1974 over differences with Anwar Sadat.

In September 2003, upon reaching the age of 80, Heikal wrote an article in the monthly magazine Weghat Nazar (where he had been writing for some time) that the time had come for an "old warrior" to put down his pen and take to the sidelines. Heikal stressed that his decision to stop writing did not mean he would disappear, but rather take to the sidelines to observe more thoroughly. In the article he also recounted a lot of the events that occurred during his life and formed his experience including his first mission as a reporter in the Second Battle of El Alamein in 1942, his friendship with Nasser and his relationship with Sadat. In addition he opened his financial records stating the salaries he had received in all his jobs and posts.

In a 2007 audience with British journalist Robert Fisk, Heikal spoke about the situation in Egypt and criticized Egyptian president Mubarak, saying that Mubarak lives in a "world of fantasy" in Sharm al Sheikh. These comments stirred an uproar within Egyptian society, both for and against Heikal. Heikal did not comment on this criticism except later on Al Jazeera, where he said that he stands by what he has said earlier, adding that Mubarak had not entered political life until very late, which means he lacks necessary experience.

== Biography ==
Born in Qalyubiyya Governorate, Egypt. His family were wealthy wheat merchants in the Nile delta. Mohamed the eldest son in his family, which included three other sisters, was trained to manage the business. However he sought a valuable degree course education at the respected American University in Cairo. During the Second World War, the graduate Heikal commenced a career in journalism at the British controlled and funded Egyptian Gazette, which he edited from 1943. The newspaper's contributors included English writers George Orwell and Lawrence Durrell. Throughout his career he was a literary critic of Anwar Sadat and Hosni Mubarak's military regimes, which he perceived as having departed from Nasser's original nationalist dream.

But this attitude was most dramatic during wartime. He covered the First Arab-Israeli War on the establishment of the State of Israel. He was also present in Cairo when the Free Officers staged a military coup d'etat in 1952. During this period he immediately befriended Gamal Abdel Nasser, a member of the group. Yet his journalism with Al-Ahram as its editor put the regimes under the microscope, gaining a reputation for investigative reporting, and sound authoritative statements. The Washington Post dubbed him "the voice of Egypt...window on a secretive regime". Heikal frequently travelled cross-desert borders between countries in the Middle East eagerly reporting on the conflicts. Heikal was an unashamed Pro-Arabist during the post-war era when Nasser dreamed of a Pan-Arab republic across the whole region. Between 1957 and 1974 he was the author of a well-regarded Friday column Bi-Saraha which spoke frankly about Nasser's policies at home and abroad, whilst also being critical. He became a member of the Arab Socialist Union Party, briefly acting as foreign minister under Nasser. But his mood changed with the Colonel's successors, whose lurch to the right shook Cairo's post-colonial establishment.

In April 1970 Heikal was appointed minister of information, replacing Mohamed Fayek in the post. After decades of tension and conflict, Sadat's decision in the 1970s was momentous: recognition of the Israeli right to occupy Jerusalem, and to the border with Sinai terminating with Port Eilat. The Egyptians and the Israelis agreed to these terms yearning for peace at almost any price. Sadat, a moderate himself, prepared to meet the implacable Cold War enemy for a negotiated settlement. Heikal was among the old Nasserite Cairo elites that opposed any suggestion of a diplomatic rapprochement with the hated enemy. In 1974 he was removed from post by Sadat's office and jailed for treasonous activity. Sadat's assassination was a setback for Arab-Israeli relations, and ushered a period of retrenched reaction to threats posed by military situations to the stability of Egypt, events explored in Heikal's book Autumn of Fury (1982). President Mubarak was more conscious of security, policing and law and order, imposing crackdowns on protests. Abroad Egypt, he continued Sadat's realignment with the West, and particularly American global capitalism that funded the permanence of the Israeli State, Mubarak's new political realism prompted Heikal's move to a fundamentalist opposition to what he interpreted as a return to colonial status quo ante. Joining Al-Jazeera Television in Qatar, Heikal was able to comment on the Gulf War and then ensuing conflicts from a purely Islamic perspective. In 1996 he published an influential publication Secret Channels in which he told the chronological story leading up to the culmination of the Oslo Peace Accords in 1993 orchestrated by the West to bring an end to decades of war in Palestine. By the end of his period at Al-Jazeera, he attacked Mubarak in his book Mubarak and His Time calling him "inept and corrupt". Nonetheless, the advent of a new extremist dawn with the Muslim Brotherhood forced Heikal to awake to the perils of chaos. The compromise position of a US-educated president and more social freedoms in Egypt made Sisi more acceptable to Heikal's nationalistic views. Heikal suffered from kidney disease in his final years, and died aged 92 from renal failure.

== Personal life ==
Heikal was married and had three sons: Hassan, Ahmed, and Ali. The first two work in finance, while the third is a doctor. At the time of his death, he had seven grandchildren.

== Al Jazeera Lecture Series ==
Heikal's lecture series on Al Jazeera furnished him with a greater platform in the Arab world, broadcasting every Thursday evening. Here he generally discussed information he acquired during his years as a journalist, historian, and a player in the political arena in Egypt's modern history. His lectures gave an overview of the fall of the Ottoman Empire and the rise of modern Arab nationalist governments. He also lectured on the rise of the American Empire and the decline of the previous superpowers. His lectures ranged from general overviews to intricate details of scenes he witnessed. In addition he discussed the events leading to the deterioration of Nasser's relationship with the Egyptian Muslim Brotherhood and the failed assassination attempt.

=== 2007 Al Jazeera Lecture Series ===
- Challenges in Building the Aswan Dam
- Aswan Dam and the National Project
- The United States and the Arab/Israeli Conflict
- Slipping into War
- Palestinians and Prospects of Settlement with Israel
- Israeli Thinking and the 1956 Events
- Conspiracy and Coup Era
- French Plans to Interfere in Egypt
- Creative Chaos and the Rivalry Links
- Conspiracy Theory
- Nasser's Debates with the West
- Prospects of Settlement in the Middle East (2)
- Prospects of Settlement in the Middle East (1)
- Nasser's Ultimate Test
- Jordan's 1956 Storm
- Behind the Arms Deal
- Security and National Peace
- Arms Deals in the Arab World
- Geneva Convention and the Importance of 1955
- Bandong Convention
- Preparing for Plan Alpha
- Israeli Penetration in the Region
- Nasser's Meeting with UK's Foreign Secretary
- 1955 and the Arab Division
- 1955 and the Distinguishing Symbols

=== 2008 Al Jazeera Lecture Series ===
- Mine in the Aqaba Gulf
- Israel's Nuclear Weapons
- Politics and History
- World on the Verge of Chaos
- World Foreign and Internal Politics
- Understanding of War in Nations
- Arab Resistance and Aid
- War Era: Strategy and Politics
- Arab False Battles
- Instance of True Revolution
- America Leads the World
- Palestine: Right Refuses to be Forgotten (2)
- Palestine: Right Refuses to be Forgotten (1)
- Israel's View on Egyptian Role in the Region
- Series of Crises in the Time of War
- The Naked Empire
- Alliance of Empires
- Monsters With Eight Heads
- Egyptian Armament and Israel's Security
- Decision Projects Associated with Suez
- Suez War
- Conspiracy Theory
- National Security Boundaries
- Protecting Suez Canal
- Seven Plans to Invade
- Suez Battle and War Era
- Truth of Wars the Arabs Fought
- National Security Theories
- Arriving Tremors
- War Era

== Literary works ==
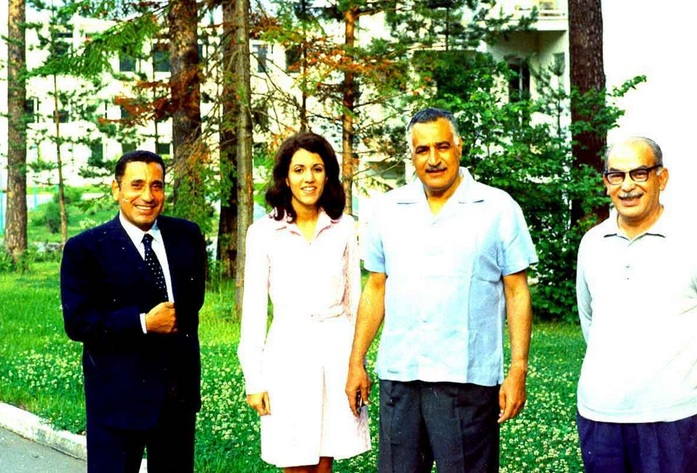
Heikal (first from left), Hoda Abdel Nasser and Egyptian president Gamal Abdel Nasser (third from left), 1966

- (1973) The Cairo Documents: The Inside Story of Nasser and His Relationship with World Leaders, Rebels, and Statesmen (New York: Doubleday, 1973), ISBN 9780385064477
- (1975) The Road to Ramadan (New York: Quadrangle/New York Times Book Co., 1975), ISBN 9780812905670
- (1978) Sphinx and Commissar: The rise and fall of Soviet influence in the Arab world (London: Collins, 1978), ISBN 9780002167871
- (1980) October War (Crown, 1980), ISBN 9780394595962
- (1981) The Return of the Ayatollah: The Iranian Revolution from Mossadeq to Khomeini (London: Deutsch, 1981) ISBN 9780233974040
- (1982) Iran: The Untold Story (Pantheon Books, 1982), ISBN 9780394522753
- (1983) Autumn of Fury: The Assassination of Sadat (London: Deutsch, 1983 & London: Corgi, 1984), ISBN 9780552990981, in which he analyzed the reasons behind Sadat’s assassination and the rise of political Islam.
- (1986) Cutting the Lion's Tale: Suez Through Egyptian Eyes (London: A. Deutsch, 1986 & New York: Arbor House, 1987), ISBN 9780233979670
- (1993) Illusions of Triumph: An Arab View of The Gulf War (London: Fontana, 1993), ISBN 9780006379454
- (1996) Secret Channels: The Inside Story of Arab-Israeli Peace Negotiations (London: HarperCollins, 1996), ISBN 9780006383376.

== Honours ==
=== Egyptian national honours ===
- Grand Cordon of the Order of the Arab Republic of Egypt
- Grand Cross of the Order of Merit (Egypt)

=== Foreign honors ===
- First class of the National Order of Merit (Algeria)
- First class of the Order of Merit (Lebanon)
- Grand cordon of the Order of Ouissam Alaouite (Morocco)
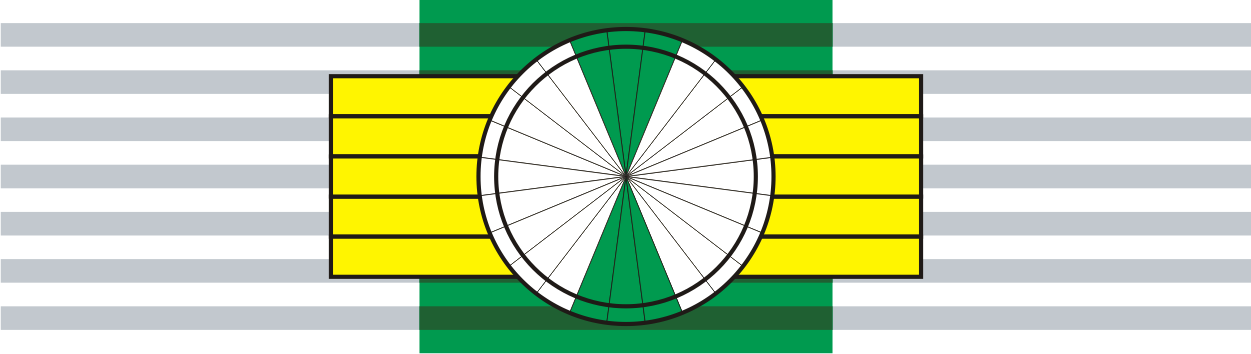
- Grand cordon of Order of Civil Merit of the Syrian Arab Republic (Syria)
- Grand Cordon of the National Order of Merit of Tunisia (Tunisia)

== Sources ==
- Sidaoui, Riadh (2003). Heikal or the secret file of arab memory. Beyrouth: Centre arabe de recherches et d'analyses.
- Any (1996), The Liberation War of Palestine: Conspiracy of the Jews and Arabs' stand, London
- Robert Fisk (9 April 2007). "Mohamed Hasseinein Heikel: The wise man of the Middle East". Independent. Archived from the original on 13 October 2007.
