= Raouf Abbas =

Egyptian historian and professor (1939-2008)

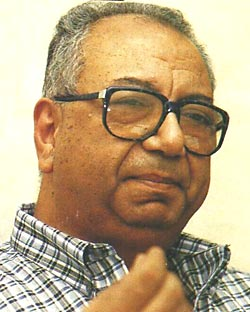
- Born: (Arabic: رؤوف عباس); 24 August 1939
- Died: 26 June 2008 (aged 68)
- Education: Cairo University
- Occupations: Historian and professor

Raouf Abbas Hamed (Arabic: رؤوف عباس) (24 August 1939 – 26 June 2008) was an Egyptian historian and a professor of modern history at Cairo University, until his death in 2008. He served as the president of the Egyptian Society of Historical Studies. He filled various senior academic positions, most of which in the Cairo University.

== Academic career ==
=== Academic positions ===
- Vice Dean for Graduate Studies and Research, Faculty of Arts, Cairo University, from September 1, 1996 – 1999.
- Visiting Full-time Professor, Department of Arabic Studies, The American University in Cairo, September 1992 - August 1996.
- Professor of Modern History, Faculty of Arts, Cairo University, from December 30, 1981, to present.
- Chairman, History Department, Faculty of Arts, Cairo University, from April 1982 to April 1988.
- Associate Professor of Modern History, Faculty of Arts, Cairo University, from January 1, 1977, to December 29, 1981.
- Seconded to Qatar University, October 1974 - August 1978.
- Lecturer, Faculty of Arts, Cairo University, from June 16, 1971, to December 31, 1976.
- Assistant, Faculty of Arts, Cairo University, from November 21, 1967, to June 15, 1971.

=== Academic activities ===
- Visiting fellow, Institute of Developing Economies, Tokyo, April 1972 - January 1973; May - September 1977.
- Visiting fellow, Institute for the Study of languages and Cultures of Asia and Africa, Tokyo University for Foreign Studies, February - September 1973; July - September 1987; October 1989 - September 1990.
- Visiting professor, Sorbonne University, Paris IV, February 1980.
- Visiting professor, Essen, Kiel, Hamburg and Freiburg Universities, Germany, November - December 1982.
- Part-time lecturer, CASA, The American University in Cairo, 1983 - 1991.
- Lecture Tour in United States organized by MESA, covered UCLA, USCLA, SCULA, Stanford University, Georgia State University, Mills College (November 1990).
- Organized and chaired six symposiums and conferences in Cairo and Ain Shams Universities, Egypt, 1978 - 1993.
- Chairman, Historical Studies Unit, Center of Political and Strategic Studies, Al-Ahram Organization, Cairo, since February 1980.
- Member, The Permanent Academic Committee of History, Supreme Council of the Egyptian Universities, since October 1985.
- Member, History Committee, The Supreme Council of Culture, Egypt, Since 1991.
- President, The Egyptian Historical Studies Association, since April 1999.
- Editor in chief, Ruzname, Annual Bulletin of the Egyptian National Archives, Cairo 2003 to present.

=== Honors ===
- Holder of Science and Arts Decoration, First class, Awarded by the President of Egypt, February 1983.
- State Prize of Distinguished Academic Achievement in Social Science, Egypt, June 2000.

=== Symposiums and conferences ===
- International Conference on Orientalism, Oriental Society of Japan, Tokyo, January 1973.
- Symposium on Methodology in History, Sorbonne University, February 1980.
- Symposium on the Euro-Arab dialogue, Konrad Adenauer Stiftung, Bonn, April 1982.
- Workshop on the History of Traditions in the Middle East, Wissenschaft Kolleg Zu Berlin, April 1986.
- Symposium on Urbanization in Islam, Oriental Studies Institute, Tokyo University, October 1989.
- Special Guest Scholar, The 1990 MESA Annual Meeting, San-Antonio, Texas, November 1990.
- Symposium on "The Middle Eastern Economy in a Prospect of Peace", European Parliament, Strasbourg, June 1994.
- Xe Réunion des Chercheurs sur le Monde, Arabe et Musulman, Afemam & Eurames, Aix-en-Provence, July 1996
- Conference on Archives and the Metropolis, Institute of Historical Research, Centre of Metropolitan History, University of London, July 1996
- Symposium on Mediterranean Cities, Municipality of Rome, Rome, November 1996.
- Panel on Abu-Qeir, History & Archeology, The Egyptian Academy, Rome, February 2002.
- Symposium on the Archival Sources of Arab History, Centre for Documentation & History, Abu-Dhabi, UAE, March 2002.
- Round table on Private Papers as a Source of Arab Contemporary History, Institut de Monde Arabe, Paris, March 2004.
- Round table on Iraq, The Royal Institute of Religious Studies, Amman, Jourdan, January 2005.
- Round table on Private Papers, The Central European University, Budapest, Hungary, March 2006
- International Conference on 1956 year of Crises, Hungary and Suez, Munk Centre For International Studies At Trinity College, University of Toronto, Canada, September 27–30, 2006.

== Bibliography ==
=== Books in English ===
- The Japanese and Egyptian Enlightenment, A Comparative Study of Fukuzawa Yukichi and Rifa'ah al-Tahtawi, ILCAA Press, Tokyo 1990.
- Society and Economy in Egypt and the Eastern Mediterranean 1600–1900, Essays in Honor of Andre Raymond, The American University in Cairo Press, 2005 (co-editor).

=== Books in Arabic ===
- al-Harakah al-`Ummaliyyah fi Misr 1899 - 1952 (Labour Movement in Egypt 1899 - 1951), Cairo 1968.
- al-Nizam al-Ijtima`i fi Misr fi Zil al-Milkiyyat al-Zira`iyyah al-Kabirah (Social structure in Egypt in relation to Big Landownership 1837 - 1914), Cairo 1973.
- Muzakkirat Muhammad Farid (Memoirs of Mohammed Farid, vol. 1, A study and Editing), Cairo 1975.
- al-Harakah al-`Ummaliyyah al-Misriyyah fi Du' al-Wathaiq al-Britaniyyah (The Egyptian Labour Movement in the Light of the British Documents 1924 - 1937), Cairo 1975.
- al-Mujtama` al-Yabani fi `Asr Meiji (The Japanese Society in Meiji Era), Cairo 1980.
- al-Siyasah al-Amrikiyyah Wal-`Arab (American Policy and the Arabs), Center of Arab Unity Studies, Beirut 1982 (co-author).
- Jama`at al-Nahdah al-Qawmiyyah (The National Revival Society), Cairo 1985.
- Henri Curiell wa al-Harakah al-Shiyu`iyyah al-Misriyyah (Henri Curiell and the Egyptian Communist Movement), Cairo 1988.
- Jami`at al-Qahirah, Madiha wa Hadiruha (Cairo University - Past and Present), Cairo 1989.
- Al-Tanweer Fi Misr Wa Al-Yaban (Enlightenment In Egypt and Japan), Cairo 2000.
- Shakhsiyyat Misriyya Fi Uyon Amrikiyya (Egyptian Personalities Seen By America), Cairo 2001.
- Thawrat Yulyu, Baad Nisf Qarn (The Revolution of July after a half Century), Cairo, 2003.
- Mashaynaha Khutan, Sirah Zatiya (Footprints, an Autobiography), Cairo, 2004.

=== Editor (Books in Arabic) ===
- Misr Lilmisriyyin, Maiat `Am ala al-Thawrah al-`Urabiyyah (Egypt for the Egyptians, Hundred years of the Urabi Revolution), Center for Political and Strategic Studies, Al-Ahram Organization, Cairo 1981.
- Misr Wa `Alam al-Bahr al-Mutawassit (Egypt and the Mediterranean World), Cairo 1986.
- al-`Arab fi Ifriqya, al-Juzur al-Tarikhiyyah wa al-Waqi` al-Mu`asir (Arabs in Africa, Historical Roots and Recent Situation), Cairo 1987.
- Misr Wa `Alam al-Bahr al-Mutawassit fi al`Asr al-Hadith (Egypt and the Mediterranean World in Modern Times), Cairo 1989.
- Arba`un `Aman `ala Thawrat Yulyu, Dirasah Tarikhiyyah (Forty Years of the July Revolution, A Historical Study), Center for Political and Strategic Studies, Al-Ahram Organization, Cairo 1992.
- Nadwat Tarikh Misr al-Iqtisadi wal-Ijtima`i fi al-`Asr al-`Uthmani (Symposium on Economic and Social History of Ottoman Egypt), Bulletin of the Faculty of Arts, Special Issue, vol 57, Cairo University Press, Cairo 1993.
- al-`Ilaqat al-Misriyya al-Britania 1951-1954 (Anglo-Egyptian Relations 1951–1954), Center for Political and Strategic Studies, Al-Ahram Organization, Cairo 1995.
- al-Ahzab al- Misriyya 1922-1953 (The Egyptian Parties 1992–1953), Center for Political and Strategic Studies, Al-Ahram Organization, Cairo 1995.
- Harb al-Suez b’ad Arba`in `Aman (Suez War after 40 Years), Center for Political and Strategic Studies, Al-Ahram Organization, Cairo 1997.
- Islah am Tahdith? Misr Fi Asr Muhammad Ali, (Reform or Modernization – Egypt Under Muhammad Ali), Cairo 2000.
- Al-Adala Bayn Al-Shri/a Wa Al-Waqi, Fi Misr Fi Al-Asr Al-Usmani (Justice Between Islamic Law and Social Realities in Ottoman Egypt), Cairo 2002.
- Watha’iq Misr fi al-Qarn al’ishreen (Documents of Egypt in the 20th century), Cairo 2002.
- Khamsoun Aaman aala Thawrat Yulyu (50 year after the July Revolution, A Symposium), Cairo 2003.
- Al-Maqalat al-Siyasiya al-Sahafyia li Taha Husayn (Press Articles on Politics by Taha Husayn), 5 volumes, Cairo 2002–2004.

=== Translations (from English to Arabic) ===
- Hachiya Michihiko, Hiroshima Diaries, Cairo 1977.
- Maurice Dobb, Studies in the Development of Capitalism, Cairo 1978.
- Alexander Schölch, Egypt for the Egyptians, Cairo 1983.
- Charles Issawi, The Fertile Crescent 1800 - 1914, A Documentary Economic History, Beirut 1989.
- Peter Gran, Islamic Roots of Capitalism, Cairo 1992.
- Nelly Hanna, Making Big Money in 1600s, Life and Times of Abu-Taqiya, Cairo 1997.
- Peter Gran, Beyond Euro-centerism, A Study in World History, Cairo 1998.
- Nelly Hanna, In Praise of Books, A Cultural History of Middle Class in Ottoman Cairo, Cairo 2003.
- Ronald Storrs, Orientations, Cairo 2005.
- Donald Reid, Whose Pharaohs?, Cairo 2005.
- Roger Owen, Lord Cromer, Cairo 2006.
