= Soldiers' Talk =

2012 novel by Ayman Otoom

- Author: Ayman Otoom
- Original title: حديث الجنود
- Language: Arabic
- Genre: Novel
- Publisher: al-Mu'asasa al-Arabiah lil-Dirasat w al-Nashr
- Publication date: February 25, 2014
- Publication place: Jordan
- Pages: 472
- ISBN: 9786144199251

Hadith al-Jnoud (Arabic: حديث الجنود, lit. 'Soldiers' Talk') is a novel by Ayman Otoom, published in 2014.. It is about student protests at Yarmouk University in Irbid, Jordan, during the mid-1980s, particularly in Ramadan in May 1986. The protests resulted in deaths, injuries, and arrests. The novel draws on accounts given to Otoom by the protest leader and other participants. Its second edition was later banned by Jordan's Publications Department after being imported from a private publishing house in Beirut, and the author was subsequently subject to legal proceedings.

Ward, the novel's main character, is presented as one of those shaped by the protests and their consequences. Through his perspective, the novel depicts the demonstrations in Irbid and the experiences of those who participated in them. Among the other characters are Naima, Ward's uncle, and a number of his companions, who represent different social and ideological backgrounds.

== Plot ==
The novel is set at Yarmouk University in Jordan during the mid-1980s, particularly during the student protests of Ramadan in 1986. Its central character, Ward, becomes involved in the demonstrations and gradually assumes a leading role among the protesting students. As tensions rise between the students and the university authorities, the novel follows Ward and those around him as they respond to arrests, violence, and political pressure.

The story also introduces a number of other characters connected to the protests. These include Naima, Ward's uncle, and several of his companions, each of whom reflects a different personal or social response to the events. Through them, the novel presents the effects of the unrest on students and their families, as well as the pressures faced by those involved in political action.

A major part of the novel focuses on the crackdown by the security forces on the Yarmouk University protests in 1986. This forms one of the central events of the narrative, as the demonstrations are met with force and the protesters face arrests, injuries, and fear. Through these events, the novel depicts the personal and collective consequences of the protests.

The novel also addresses the psychological effects of the unrest on its characters, especially Ward and those close to him. Themes such as fear, loss, endurance, and political commitment appear throughout the narrative as it portrays student activism in a tense and restrictive environment.

== Ban in Jordan ==
Jordanian authorities suspended distribution of the second edition of Ayman Otoom's novel Hadith al-Jnoud ("The Soldiers' Talk") pending a judicial decision in a publications case. According to Amjad Al-Qadi, head of the Media Authority, the Publications Department did not issue a final ban on the novel but asked the publisher to stop distributing the second edition until the court ruled on the alleged violations found in it. He also said that the department had not received copies of the first edition, which had been printed in Jordan. When the second edition arrived from Beirut, its distribution was halted until the case was decided.

The case concerned passages that were alleged to violate publication rules, including material related to the events at Yarmouk University and references interpreted as offensive to the security services. Otoom described the measure as a ban on a literary work, arguing that the novel had effectively become unavailable in Jordan even though its first edition had sold out. He added that, in his view, the book could still circulate in other Arab countries.
