= Heart in the Right Place =

2007 book by Carolyn Jourdan

- Author: Carolyn Jourdan
- Genre: Memoir
- Publisher: Algonquin Books
- Publication date: 2007

Heart in the Right Place is a memoir by Carolyn Jourdan, published by Algonquin Books of Chapel Hill in 2007 (hardback) and 2008 (paperback).

The Wall Street Journal ranked it as the #7 National Bestseller on September 2, 2012. and No. 9 bestseller in 2017. It reached #1 on Amazon for Biography, Memoir, Medicine, and Science during the month of August, 2012.Family Circle magazine chose Heart in the Right Place as its first ever Book of the Month, and Elle magazine awarded it a Readers Prize.

The book was chosen by Michigan for "Capital Area Reads One Book" in 2010.

Jourdan is a former Counsel to the U.S. Senate Committee on Environment and Public Works and the U.S. Senate Committee on Governmental Affairs (now Homeland Security and Governmental Affairs).
