= Expedition of Usama bin Zayd =

632 military expedition of the Rashidun Caliphate into Byzantine Syria

Expedition of Usama ibn Zayd
- Part of the Arab–Byzantine wars
Date	June 632 AD
Location	Balqa
Result	Rashidun victory

Belligerents
Rashidun Caliphate	Byzantine Empire

Commanders and leaders
Usama ibn Zayd; Umar; Sa'd ibn Abi Waqqas; Sa'id ibn Zayd; Abu Ubayda ibn al-Jarrah; Qatada ibn al-Nu'man	Unknown

Strength
Approximately 3,000 soldiers	Unknown

Casualties and losses
Unknown	Unknown

The Expedition of Usama bin Zayd was a military expedition of the early Muslim Caliphate led by Usama ibn Zayd that took place in June 632, in which Muslim forces raided Byzantine Syria. The expedition came three years after the Battle of Mu'tah.

After the Farewell Pilgrimage, the Islamic prophet Muhammad appointed Usama ibn Zayd as the commander of an expeditionary force which was to invade the region of Balqa in the Byzantine Empire. Prophet Muhammad sent Usama to Syria to avenge the Muslim martyrs of the Battle of Mu'tah, in which Usama's father and Muhammad's adopted son, Zayd ibn Harithah, had been killed.

Usama's campaign was successful and his army was the first Muslim force to successfully invade and raid Byzantine territory, thus paving the way for the subsequent Muslim conquest of the Levant and Muslim conquest of Egypt, both of which took place during Usama's lifetime.

== Background ==
The Battle of Mu'tah was fought in September 629 near the village of Mu'tah, east of the Jordan River and Karak, between the forces of Muhammad and the forces of the Byzantine Empire and their Arab Christian Ghassanid vassals. In Islamic historical sources, the battle is usually described as the Muslims' attempt to take retribution against the Ghassanids after a Ghassanid official executed Muhammad's emissary who was en route to Bosra. During the battle the Muslim army was routed. After three Muslim leaders (including Usama's father, Zayd ibn Harithah), were killed, the command was given to Khalid ibn al-Walid and he succeeded in saving the rest of the forces. The surviving Muslim forces retreated to Medina.

After the Farewell Pilgrimage in 632, Muhammad appointed Usama ibn Zayd as the commander of an expeditionary force which was to invade the region of Balqa in the Byzantine Empire. The stated aim of this expedition was to avenge the Muslim losses at the Battle of Mu'tah, in which Usama's father and Muhammad's adopted son, Zayd ibn Harithah, had been killed. Usama gathered a force of approximately 3000 men, of which 1000 were cavalry soldiers, and Abu Bakr had intended on joining Usama on campaign. Usama had also sent spies ahead of him, from which he learned that the enemy were still unaware of the imminent approach of his army.

However, due to Muhammad's death on 8 June, the campaign was delayed and Abu Bakr was elected as Caliph in Medina. With the death of Muhammad, some Muslim leaders and citizens resisted going under the command of Usama because they thought that he, who was 20 at the time, was too young to lead an army. Muhammad dismissed these concerns. This incident is also mentioned in the Sahih al-Bukhari. Certain companions of the prophet tried to persuade Abu Bakr, who succeeded Muhammad as leader of the Islamic community, to replace Usama as commander of the army with Umar Ibn Al-Khattab, due to Usama's youth.

Abu Bakr was under great pressure regarding this expedition due to rising rebellion and apostasy across Arabia, but he was determined. Abu Bakr reaffirmed the decision of Muhammad and dispatched the expedition with Usama as commander.

== Expedition ==
According to Al-Tabari, before Usama headed out and raided the inhabitants of Syria, Abu Bakr commanded Usama to follow ten rules of war. The tradition of the ten rules of Abu Bakr is also mentioned in the Sunni Hadith collection of Al-Muwatta. (Note: Then (Abu Bakr) said, "Oh army, stop and I will order you [to do] ten [things]; learn them from me by heart. You shall not engage in treachery; you shall not act unfaithfully; you shall not engage in deception; you shall not indulge in mutilation; you shall kill neither a young child nor an old man nor a woman; you shall not fell palm trees or burn them, you shall not cut down [any] fruit-bearing tree; you shall not slaughter a sheep or a cow or a camel except for food. You will pass people who occupy themselves in monks' cells; leave them alone, and leave alone what they busy themselves with. You will come to a people who will bring you vessels in which are varieties of food; if you eat anything from [those dishes], mention the name of God over them. You will meet a people who have shaven the middle of their head and have left around it [a ring of hair] like turbans; tap them lightly with the sword. Go ahead, in God's name!")

Tabari states that the expedition was successful, and Usama reached Syria and became the first Muslim force to successfully raid Byzantine territory, thus paving the way for the subsequent Muslim conquests of Syria and Egypt from the Byzantine Empire. (Note: Tabari:"advanced quickly to Dhu al-Marwah and the valley and ended up doing what the Prophet had ordered him to do, dispersing horsemen among the Quda'a tribes (who were Ghassanid vassals) and raiding Abil. He took captives and booty, and his completion of the mission was within forty days, excepting the time of his return.")

This expedition became notable in Islamic history due to how the still eighteen year old Usama was appointed as overall commander, leading veterans and high ranked companions of Muhammad such as Umar, Sa'd ibn Abi Waqqas, Sa'id ibn Zayd, Abu Ubayda ibn al-Jarrah, and Qatada ibn al-Nu'man. (Note: Recorded by Ibn al-Jawzi his Talqīḥ fuhūm ahl al-athar fī ʻuyūn al-tārīkh wa-al-siyar and Nur ad-Din al-Halabi in his Al sirah al halabiyah Juz 2 : The biography of al-'amin al-ma'mun.)

== See also ==
- List of expeditions of Muhammad
- Muslim conquest of the Levant
- Ridda Wars
- Ghazwa
- Islamic military jurisprudence
- Zayd ibn Haritha

== Bibliography ==
- Buhl, F. (1993). "Muʾta". In Bosworth, C. E.; van Donzel, E.; Heinrichs, W. P. & Pellat, Ch. (eds.). The Encyclopaedia of Islam, Second Edition. Volume VII: Mif–Naz. Leiden: E. J. Brill. p. 756. ISBN 978-90-04-09419-2.
- El Hareir, Idris; M'Baye, El Hadji Ravane (2011). The Different Aspects of Islam Culture: Volume 3, The Spread of Islam throughout the World. UNESCO publishing.
- Gil, Moshe (1997) [1983]. A History of Palestine, 634–1099. Translated by Ethel Broido. Cambridge: Cambridge University Press. ISBN 0-521-59984-9.
- Kaegi, Walter E. (1992). Byzantium and the Early Islamic Conquests. Cambridge: Cambridge University Press. ISBN 978-0521411721.
- Mubarakpuri, Saifur Rahman Al (2005), The Sealed Nectar (Free Version), Darussalam Publications, ISBN 9798694145923. Note: This is the free version available on Google Books
