= Aiman =

Arabic language given name

- Pronunciation: Arabic: [ˈʔæjmæn]
- Gender: Neutral
- Language: Arabic

Origin
- Meaning: "Righteous, blessed, lucky"

Other names
- See also: Ayman

Aiman (Arabic: أيمن) is a gender neutral name with origins in Arabic, Urdu and Kazakh. It is an alternative Latin alphabet spelling of the name Ayman. In Arabic, it is derived from the Semitic root (ي م ن) for right, and literally means righteous, blessed or lucky.

In Urdu, Aiman (ایمن) is a feminine name meaning "مبارک، مبارکباد دینے والی، بےخوف، محفوظ." she who is fortunate or blessed.

In Kazakh, Aiman (Айман) is a feminine name and has the lunar meaning beauty of the moon.

An early bearer of the name was Ayman ibn Ubayd, an early Muslim and sahabi of the Islamic prophet Muhammad.

== Notable people with the name include ==
- Aiman Napoli, Italian footballer
- Aiman Khan, Pakistani actress
- Aiman Umarova, Kazakh human rights lawyer
- Aiman Hakim Ridza, Malaysian actor and singer
- Aiman Witjaksono, Indonesian journalist and host of Aiman (TV program)
- Aiman Al-Hagri, Yemeni footballer
- Aiman Al Ziyoud, Jordanian television producer
- Fakrul Aiman Sidid, Malaysian footballer
- Aiman El-Shewy, Egyptian judoka
- Prince Muhammad Aiman of Brunei, son of Prince Al-Muhtadee Billah, Crown Prince of Brunei
- Aiman Abdallah, German-Egyptian TV presenter
- Aiman Khwajah Sultan, Prince of Moghulistan
- Aimen Dean, founding member of Al-Qaeda

== See also ==
- Ayman
