= Salama Ahmed Salama =

Egyptian journalist (1932–2011)

- سلامة أحمد سلامة
- Born: 1932; Cairo, Kingdom of Egypt
- Died: 11 July 2012 (aged 79–80)
- Education: University of Minnesota School of Journalism and Mass Communication
- Occupation: Journalist
- Years active: 1950s–2012

Salama Ahmed Salama (1932 – 11 July 2012) was an eminent and well-respected Egyptian journalist, editor and author. He served as the vice chief editor for Al-Ahram newspapers for 22 years. and was editor-in-chief of Al-Shorouk newspaper and the political magazine Points of View. Salama also wrote a number of non-fiction books and served on the board of the Egyptian Journalists' Syndicate.

He has been called "perhaps the only Egyptian journalist who commands the respect of his colleagues right across the political spectrum." and one who has "retained the status of a non-partisan writer, often critical of the government and its policies, yet not a member of the opposition." He was well known for being highly critical of the Egyptian government.

== Personal life and education ==
He was born in Cairo in 1932. His father, an Arabic language teacher, was from Sharqiya in the Nile Delta. Salama obtained his BA in philosophy in 1953, and obtained a scholarship to pursue his higher studies in West Germany in the late 1950s and early 1960s, while becoming a foreign correspondent for Akhbar el-Yom. He stayed for four years, returning to Akhbar el-Yom in 1964 as diplomatic affairs editor.

He obtained his MA in journalism from the University of Minnesota and came back again when the 1967 Six-Day War broke out. He met his wife Juliane in Germany and they had two married sons, Tarek and Karim, both of whom live in Germany.

== Career ==
He began working at Al-Ahram in 1968 and returned to Europe once more, remaining until 1972, as the paper's correspondent there. His years spent in Germany in the late 1950s and 1960s were the best part of his career, and it is there he formed a vision of what it is to be a journalist. He knew what it meant to have a press that is "strong and independent and respected". When he came back to Egypt, he began his weekly foreign policy column, "The Meaning of Events". In 1989 he started his daily column "Close Up" in dealing not with foreign policy analysis but commentary on everyday life.

Salama covered major international and Arab summits and conferences, such as the meetings of the UN General Assembly, and the US Presidential elections. He interviewed heads of State and leading politicians and is a specialist in German affairs. He was also noted for his writing on urban planning, the environment, and the poor human rights record of Arab governments, his stand in favor of non-governmental organisations and for easing political and administrative restrictions of them.

Recently Salama left Al-Ahram after helping form Al-Shorouk in January 2009. Salama wrote a number of non-fiction books including Grey Areas and The New Middle East. His most recent book, released in February 2009, was called Journalism under a Hot Tin Roof.

He was elected to the Egyptian Journalists' Syndicate board and served as a board member for a short time.
