= Abu Ayman =

Abu Ayman is the name of:

- Abu Ayman al-Iraqi, top ISIL commander (1965–2014)
- Abu Ayman al-Masri, Egyptian leader of al-Qaeda in the Arabian Peninsula
