= Ayman Sikseck =

Israeli Arab author

Ayman Sikseck (or Ayman Siksik or Ayman Siksek, Arabic: أيمن سكسك, Hebrew: איימן סיכסק; born 1984, Jaffa) is an Israeli–Palestinian author, literary critic, opinion journalist and news anchor. He writes mainly in Hebrew, and his debut novel To Jaffa was published in 2010. He writes for the Ha'aretz newspaper. Siksek won the National Library of Israel's 2013/2014 scholarship to encourage young Israeli writers.

== Biography ==
Sikseck was born to a Muslim family in Jaffa, where he still lives today. He earned a BA in English Literature and General and Comparative Literature at the Hebrew University in Jerusalem.

His first story was published when he was 18, in Sof'Shavua weekend supplement of Ma'ariv. About a year later he published another short story as part of the Ha'aretz newspaper short story competition, and began publishing a series of short stories titled Jaffa Tel Aviv in the Culture and Literature supplement of the same paper. This short stories series was the basis for his debut novel, To Jaffa, in 2010. To Jaffa was translated into German in 2012, and into Arabic in 2014.

Between 2007 and 2010 Sikseck was among the prominent literary critics of Haaretz books supplement. Previously, he published literature reviews in the culture section of the Web site Ynet. He writes op-eds in Yediot Aharonot.

Short stories, poems and articles of Sikseck were published in the magazine Alachson; In the poetry magazine Sha'ar La'Shira 2004 of Helicon; In the quarterly magazine of Keshet Hadasha; In the Arab–Jewish quarterly magazine of Du-et; And the Maayan poetry magazine.

Sikseck was also the co-editor of the collection of poems "Tell it not in Gath: The Palestinian Nakba in Hebrew poetry, 1948–1958," (in Hebrew) edited by Hannan Hever.

In an interview to the Sheva Leilot supplement of Yediot Ahronot on June 3, 2016, he came out as gay.
