= Facts for Life =

UNICEF book

- Subject: Child health
- Genre: Non-fiction
- Publisher: UNICEF
- Publication date: 1989

Facts for Life is a book published and distributed by UNICEF. It provides basic, clearly expressed advice about child health. According to UNICEF:

Each year, around 9 million children die from preventable and treatable illnesses before reaching their fifth birthday ... It is possible to save lives and greatly reduce human suffering by expanding low-cost prevention, treatment and protection measures. The challenge is to ensure that this knowledge is shared with parents, caregivers and communities, who are the first line of defence in protecting children from illness and harm.

Facts for Life provides this information in an easy-to-understand format and in 215 languages. Since it was first published in 1989, it has become one of the most popular books in the world, with an estimated 15 million copies in use in 200 countries.
