= Qatada ibn al-Nu'man =

Companion (Sahabi) of Muhammad

Qatada ibn al-Nu'man (Arabic: قتادة بن النعمان) (c.581–c.644) was one of the companions of the Islamic prophet Muhammad and a member of the Ansar of Medina.

== Biography ==
He was the son of al-Nu'man ibn Zayd, of the Zafar branch of the Nabit clan of the Aws tribe, and of Unaysa bint Qays, who was from the Najjar clan of the Khazraj tribe. His wives were: Hind bint Aws, from the Qawaqil allies; al-Khansa' bint Khunayd, who was from the Ghassan tribe; and A'isha bint Jurayy, also from the Zafar sub-clan. His children by Hind were Abdullah and Umm 'Amr. Both al-Khansa' and A'isha are variously said to be the mother of his other two children, 'Amr and Hafsa.

According to Al-Waqidi, Qatada was present at the second pledge at al-Aqabah; but his name does not appear on Ibn Ishaq's list.

Qatada is listed among Muhammad's archers. He fought at Badr, Uhud, the Ditch "and all the battles with the Messenger of Allah." When Qatada ibn al-Nu‘man was wounded in the eye by an arrow on the day of Uhud, his eyeball was dislodged and hung on his cheek. His companions wanted to cut it off, but decided to consult Muhammad first. He said, “No!” then ordered Qatada to be brought to him, he pushed his eyeball back into place with his hand, blew some of his spittle on it then said, “O God, give him beauty!” It became Qatada’s best eye and when the other eye suffered from infection, that one never did. Source: Mustadrak At the conquest of Mecca, Qatada carried the banner of the Zafar clan.

He died in 23 AH (643–644 AD) at the age of 65 (lunar) years, and Umar conducted his funeral prayers.

== Descendants ==
One of his grandsons, Asim ibn Umar ibn Qatada (died 120 or 129 AH (738 or 747)), was a notable narrator of hadith and was a major source for the historian Ibn Ishaq. Qatada had no further male-line descendants after Asim.

== See also ==
- Sunni view of the Sahaba
