= Adolphe Jourdan =

French painter (1825–1889)

- Born: Adolphe Jourdan; 4 August 1825; Nîmes, France
- Died: 22 February 1889 (aged 63); Nîmes, France
- Occupation: Painter
- Known for: Painting

Adolphe Jourdan (4 August 1825 – 22 February 1889) was a French painter.

== Early life and education ==
Adolphe Jourdan was born on 4 August 1825 in Nîmes, France.

His father, a drawing instructor in Nîmes, introduced him to art before he trained in Paris with Léon Cogniet, Paul Delaroche, and Charles Jalabert. In the mid-1840s, he began his training as a painter at the School of Fine Arts (École des Beaux-Arts) in Paris, studying under French painter Charles Jalabert.

== Career ==
Adolphe Jourdan earned the prize of honor at the 1863 Exposition Régionale des Beaux-Arts in Nîmes for his single painting on display.

The native of Nimes began exhibiting at the annual Paris Salon held by the Académie des Beaux-Arts in 1855, receiving medals in 1864, 1866, and 1869. In 1864, his piece titled Leda earned him a medal at the exhibition and praise from Théophile Gautier. He received another medal in 1866 for The Secrets of Love. In 1869, he exhibited A Reading and Young Fishers, with the latter acquired by the Musée des Beaux-Arts de Nîmes.

Jourdan was ranked among France's popular painters alongside Jean-Léon Gérôme and Alexandre Cabanel. Employed by a Parisian art dealer, he painted replicas of masterworks, notably Cabanel's The Birth of Venus (1864), frequently mistaken for the original.

In 1874, Vincent van Gogh expressed his admiration for him in letters to his brother Theo.

At the 1877 Salon, Adolphe Jourdan exhibited A Breakfast at Saint-Honorat. In 1876, he showcased The Good-By and The Three Friends. During the 1876 Johnston sale in New York, A Young Italian Mother sold for $2,300. At the Salon of 1878, he presented a portrait and The Banks of the Gardon.

Jourdan later became the director of the Nîmes School of Fine Arts (École supérieure des beaux-arts de Nîmes).

At the Salon of 1888, Jourdan exhibited a portrait of Gaston Boissier.

== Death ==
Adolphe Jourdan died on 22 February 1889 in Nîmes, France.

== Works ==
- The 4 Seasons (1857)
- Young Winemaker (1861)
- Bathing Girl (1870)
- Leda (1864)
- Cupid's Secrets (1866)
- Venus and Cupid (1869)
- Meditation (1874)
- Young Italian Mother (1874)
- Pursuit (1874)
- Little Girl (1875)
- Parting (1876)
- Three Friends (1876)
- Breakfast at Saint-Honorat (1877)
- On the Banks of the Gardon (1878)
- Venus (1879)
- Nurse (1879)
- Mother and Child (1880)
- The First Step (1881)
- Girl with a Shell (1882)
- Woman Charming a Bird (1883)
- First Smiles (1884)
- Study (1884)
- Une Loge (1885)
- Brindisi (1885)

== Gallery ==
Works by Adolphe Jourdan

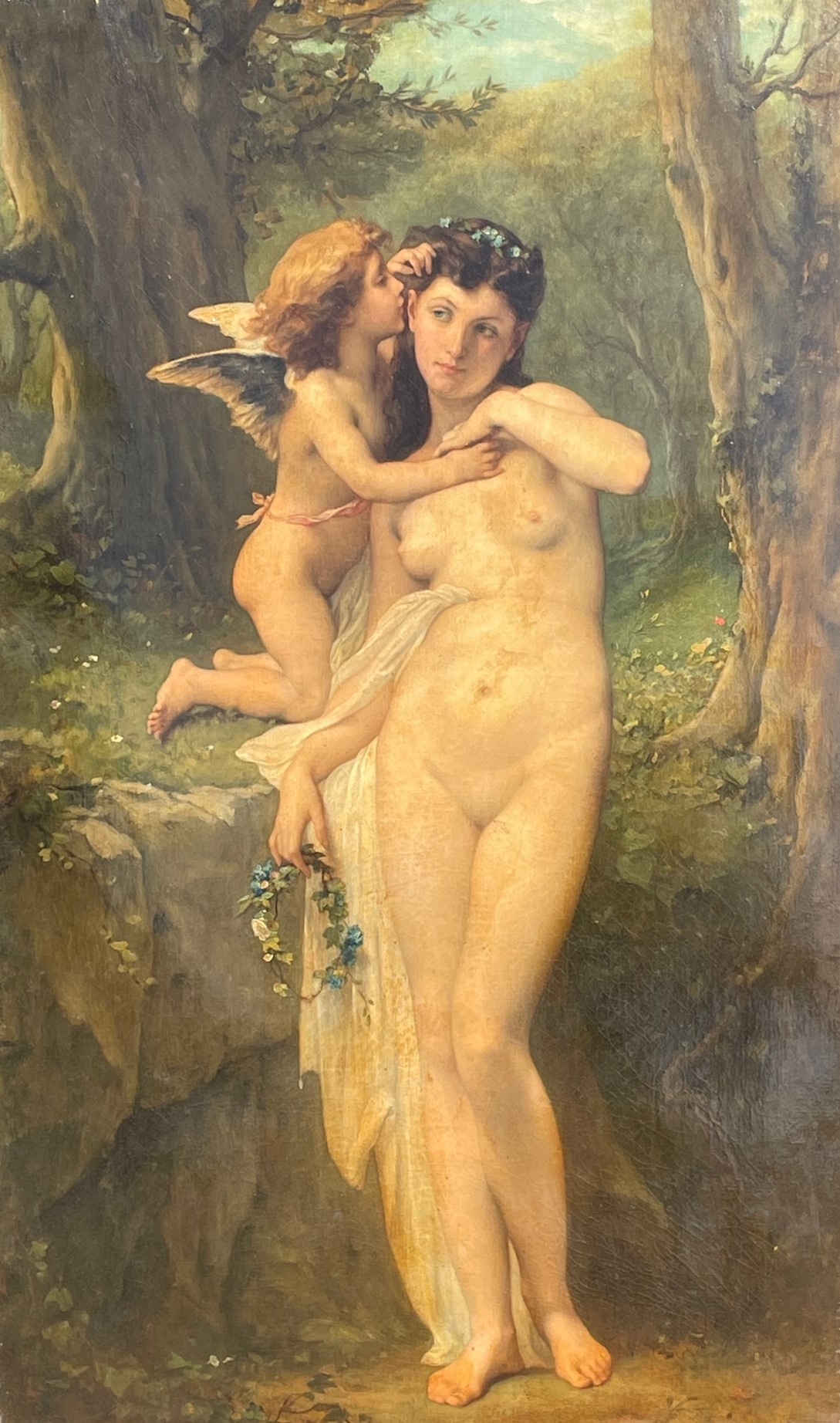
Les secrets de l'amour, 1866

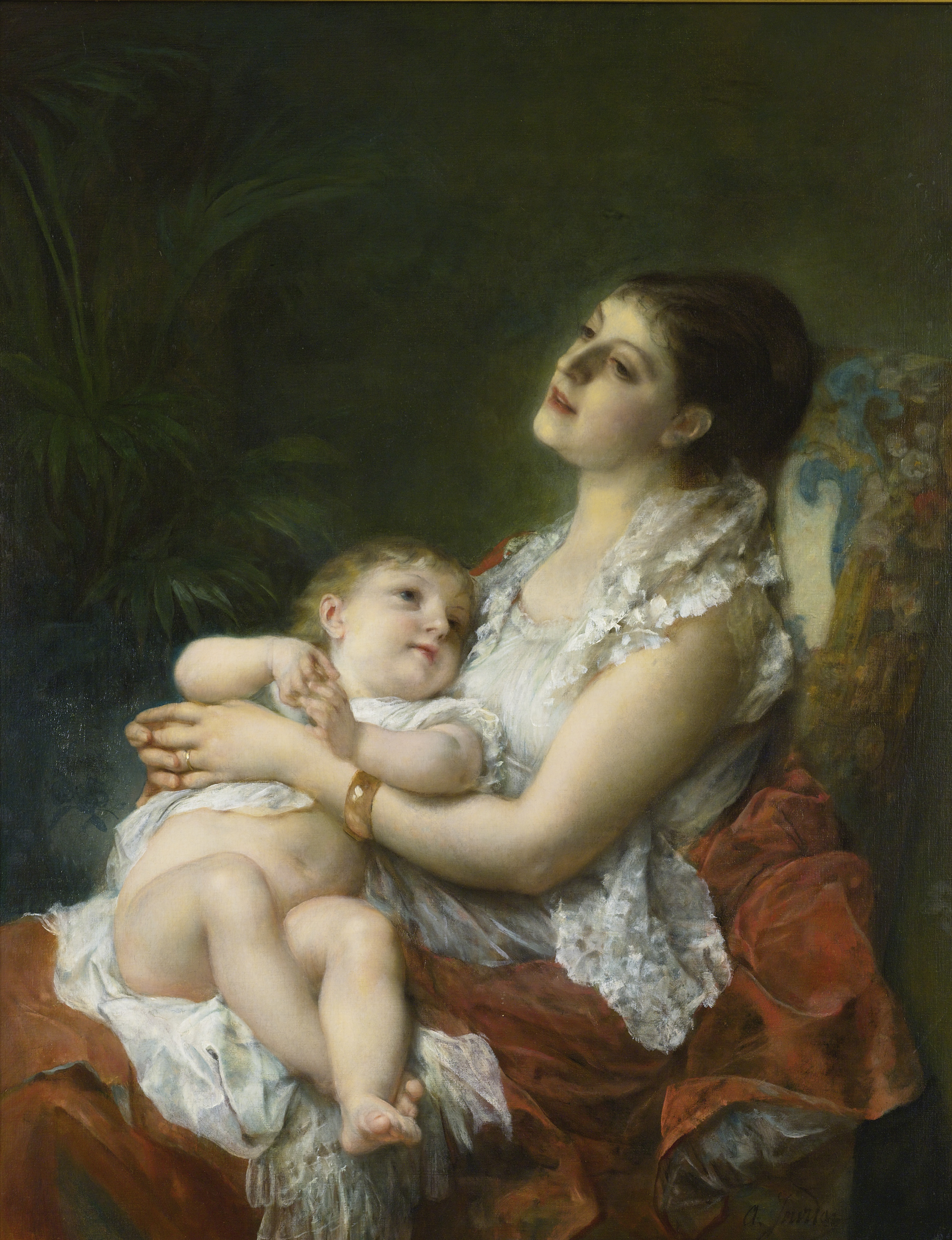
A Mother's Embrace

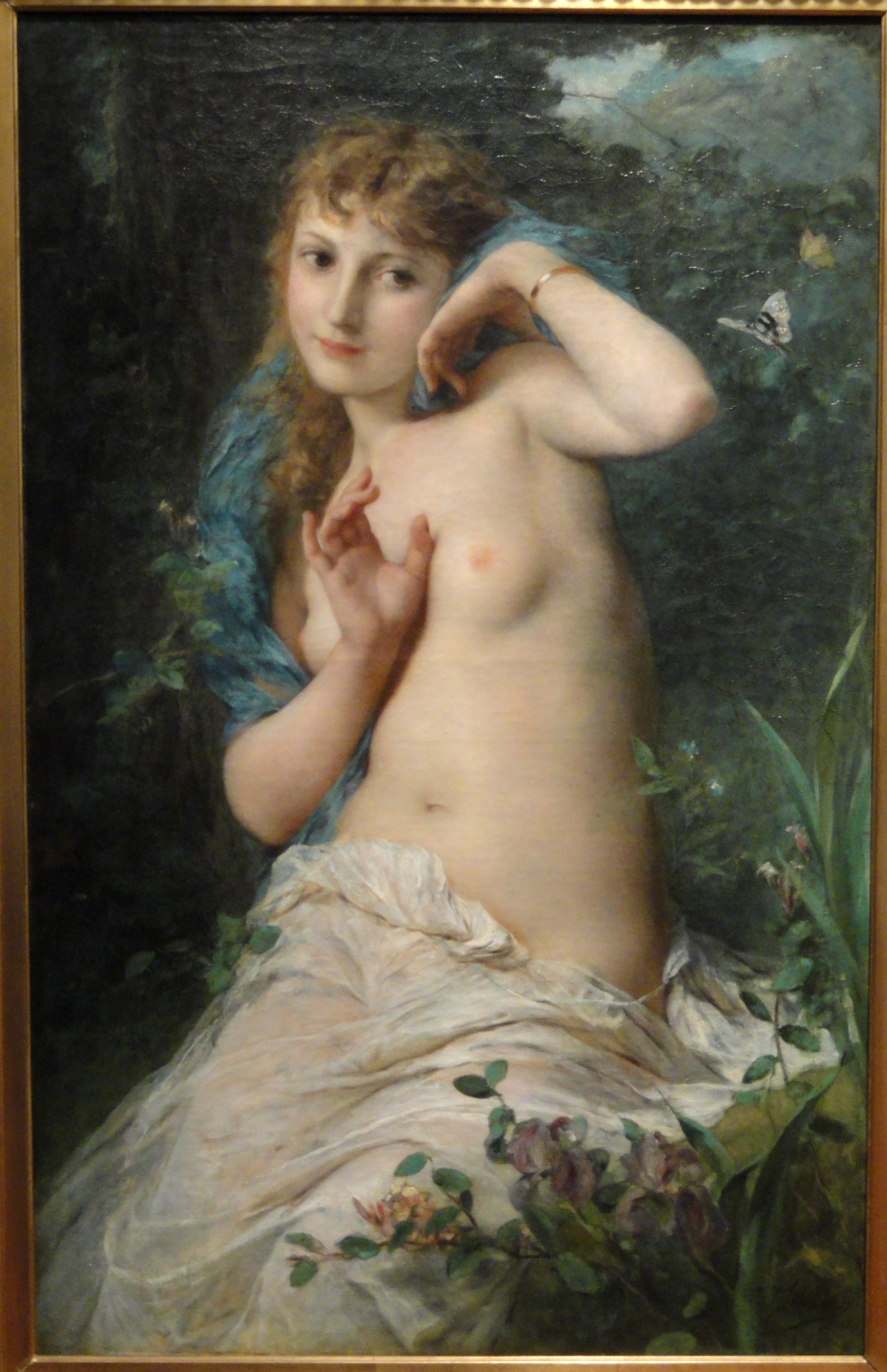
Le Papillon, 1860

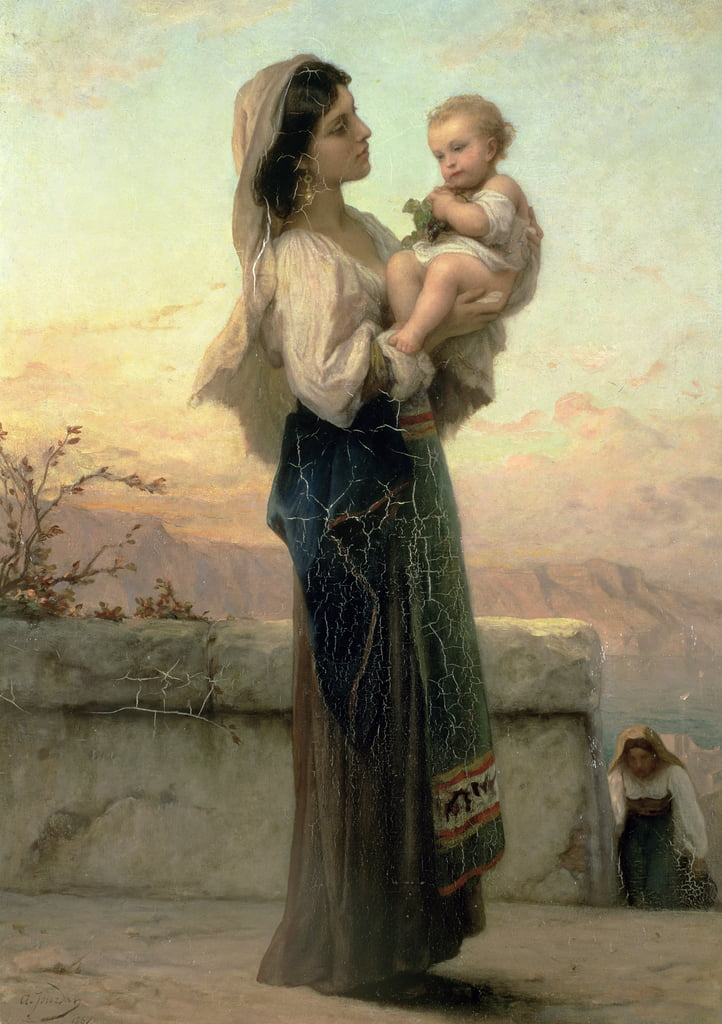
Madonna and child, 1867

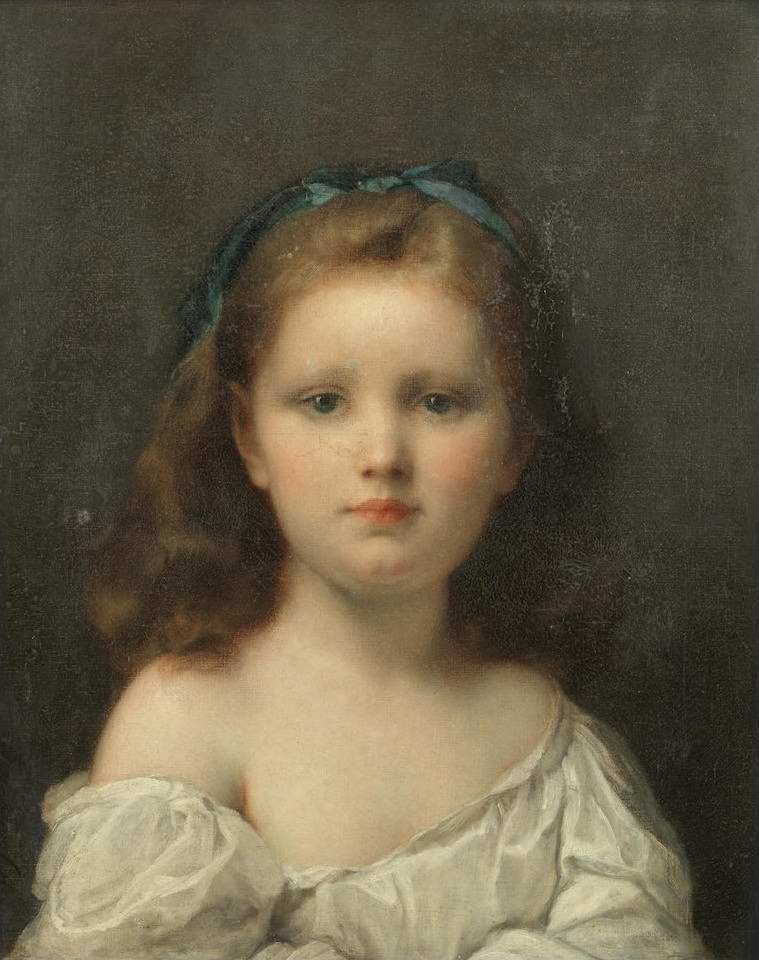
Marquise des Rossi, née Elaghine, 1860
