= Ayman Otoom =

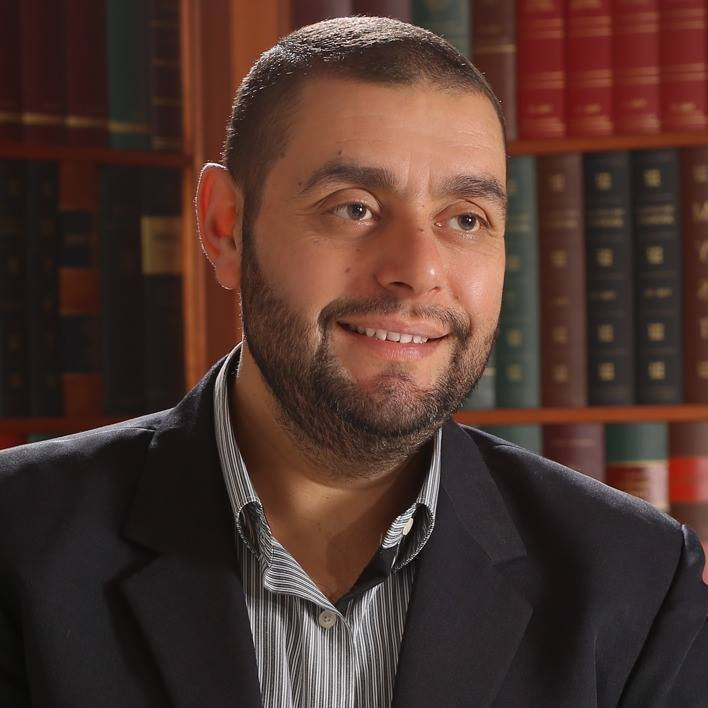
- Born: 2 March 1972 (age 53); Jerash, Jordan
- Education: Jordan University of Science and Technology; Yarmouk University; University of Jordan
- Occupations: Poet, novelist
- Website: Ayman Otoom

Ayman Otoom (Arabic: أيمن العتوم; born 2 March 1972) is a Jordanian poet and novelist.

== Biography ==
Otoom was born in Jerash, in northern Jordan. He went to high in the United Arab Emirates, then returned to Jordan and got a degree in civil engineering from Jordan University of Science and Technology, in 1997, then shifted careers toward language and literature. He received a BA in Arabic from Yarmouk University in 1997, and then a Master's and PhD in Arabic from the University of Jordan, in 2007, and teaches in Amman.

As of 2013, he had published three novels. He is a teacher in Amman. His novel O my two companions of the prison (2012) reflects the personal experience of the writer in Jordanian prisons during 1996 and 1997 as a political prisoner. His novel Soldiers' Talk is a retelling of a protest in 1986 at Yarmouk University, which was suppressed by Jordanian security forces. Otoom was fined 5000 Dinar because the book "foment[ed] religious and racial discord", and was detained for eight months following the verdict.

In 2016, he was arrested for two days. He was released on bail. He was accused of blasphemy according to his lawyer.

He has written poetry as well, including Take me to the Al-Aqsa Mosque (2013). In 2013 he was invited to participate in the nadwa organized for the International Prize for Arabic Fiction, a masterclass in writing.

Ayman Otoom's literature is known for its Islamic character.

== Publications ==
=== Novels ===
- Oh _you_ Two Companions of The Prison (2012)
- They Hear Its Whispering (2012)
- The Taste of Death (2013)
- Soldiers' Talk (2014)

The novel They Hear Her Whispering is a bestseller amongst prison literature and it earned fame due to the controversy surrounding it.

They Hear Her Whispering tells the story of a prisoner in Palmyra prison and the Syrian Al-Khatib military prison. Otoom at the beginning of the novel.

=== Poetry ===
- Take me to the Al-Aqsa Mosque (2013)
