= Ayman Al-Salek =

Syrian television actor and voice actor

- أيمن السالك
- Occupation: Actor - Voice acting
- Years active: 1982–present

Ayman Al-Salek (Arabic: أيمن السالك) is a Syrian television actor and voice actor.

== Business ==
=== TV series ===
- gadr al zaman.
- al thoban (the snick).
- al dakila.

=== Plays ===
- Canon al thani
- Cinderella

=== Dubbing roles ===
- Detective Conan
- Slam Dunk - Ryota Miyagi, Hikoichi Aida, Mitsuyoshi Anzai, Nozomi Takamiya
- Naruto - Shikamaru Nara
- The Legend of the North Wind
- The Sylvester & Tweety Mysteries - Sylvester (Venus Center version)
- Tiny Toon Adventures - Buster Bunny
- Dragon Ball Z - Dodoria
- Digimon Tamers - Guilmon
- Samurai 7 - Katayama Gorobei
- The Powerpuff Girls - Professor Utonium (first dub)
- Double Dragon (TV series) - Chop, Trigger Happy, Wild Willy, Icepick, Countdown
- The Bots Master
- SWAT Kats: The Radical Squadron - Commander Feral
- Bruno the Kid
- Ultraforce
