= Centre d'études et de documentation économiques, juridiques et sociales =

French sponsored research center in Cairo, Egypt

The CEDEJ (Centre d'études et de documentation économiques, juridiques et sociales Eng.:Centre for Economic, Judicial, and Social Study and Documentation) is a French sponsored research center located in Cairo, Egypt, created in 1968. The Cedej has the status of a "Joint Entity of French Research Institutes Abroad" (UMIFRE, Unité Mixte des Instituts français de recherche à l’étranger) and is under the aegis of the French Ministry of Foreign Affairs and the CNRS (National Centre for Scientific Research). Karine Bennafla is its director since September 2015.

It has published numerous books and periodicals in all fields of social sciences in Egypt, the Sudan and the Arabic world. Among these, Egypte/Monde arabe, published from 1990, which is online in full text on the portal revues.org.

It includes a social sciences library of more than 35,000 books, most of them in Arabic; a database of geolocated statistics; and a collection of old and new maps of Egypt and its cities.
