= Ayman Safiah =

Arab-Palestinian dancer

- Born: 1991
- Died: 2020 (aged 28–29)
- Citizenship: Palestine
- Occupation: Ballet dancer
- Years active: 2007-2020
- Employer: Rambert Dance Company

Ayman Safiah (1991-2020) was a Palestinian-Israeli ballet dancer. He was described by the BBC as the first classically trained Palestinian ballerino.

Safiah trained at the Kibbutz Contemporary Dance Company. He said that he had struggled to be accepted in his community, who saw his dance as sinful and "un-Palestinian". He joined the Rambert Dance Company at the age of sixteen. Safiah was featured in Wayne Sleep's film A Bigger Space for Dancing and in Badke, a show created by Palestinian and Belgian artists that parodied the dabke.

He told the BBC that he grew up as the only boy who took classical ballet classes at his town's cultural center in Kafr Yasif. He said that when he returned to the city in 2012, at the age of 21, there were about eight boys taking ballet lessons, who credited him for "showing them the way". Safiah died in May 2020, at the age of 29, after being pulled into a raging Mediterranean sea alongside a friend near Atlit. Regional media stated that he had managed to push his friend back into the shore, but was not able to save himself. His funeral was attended by over a thousand people, including regional council chair Shadi Shviri. Israeli culture minister Hili Tropper said that his death was a "great loss" to the community.
