= Carolyn Jourdan =

American novelist

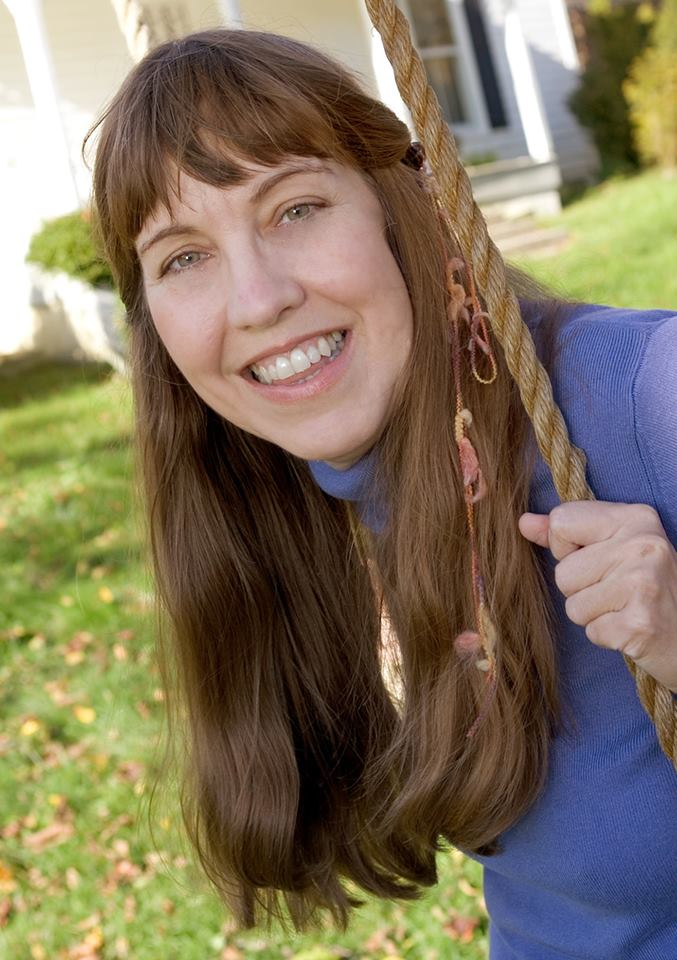
- Jourdan in 2006
- Education: University of Tennessee (JD, BS)
- Writing career
- Language: English
- Period: 2005–present
- Genres: Memoir, Biography, Medicine, Science, Wildlife, Travel, and Mystery
- Subjects: Smoky Mountain culture and Southern Appalachian dialect
- Notable works: Heart in the Right Place, Bear in the Back Seat, Medicine Men, Out on a Limb
- Website: www.carolynjourdan.com

Carolyn Jourdan is an American author, USA Today, Top-10 Audible, and six-time Wall Street Journal Top-10 bestselling memoirist, biographer, and mystery writer.

== Biography ==
Jourdan's first book, a memoir, Heart in the Right Place, was a Wall Street Journal No. 7 bestseller in 2012 and No. 9 bestseller in 2017.

Heart in the Right Place is the true story of a spoiled, high-powered United States Senate lawyer who gives up a glamorous life in Washington, D.C. and comes back home to the Great Smoky Mountains to work as an inept receptionist in her father's rural medical office. It was published by Algonquin Books of Chapel Hill in 2007 (hardback) and 2008 (paperback). According to WorldCat, it is held in 1,076 libraries.

Family Circle magazine chose Heart in the Right Place as its first ever Book of the Month, and Elle awarded it a Readers Prize. It was honored in Michigan with a One City One Book in the Capital Area Reads One Book in 2010.

Medicine Men: Extreme Appalachian Doctoring (2012) was Jourdan's second book. It was a Wall Street Journal No. 5 bestseller in 2014, a Wall Street Journal No. 6 bestseller in 2015, and a Wall Street Journal No. 9 bestseller in 2022, Medicine Men was No. 1 in Biography & Memoir, Science, and Medicine on Amazon. It is a follow-on to Heart in the Right Place and is a collection of true stories from Jourdan's family and over a dozen physicians who practiced in Southern Appalachia.

Bear in the Back Seat: Adventures of a Wildlife Ranger in the Great Smoky Mountains National Park is a two-part memoir with Kim DeLozier. It was a Wall Street Journal No. 9 bestseller in 2013 and New York Times No. 7 audio book bestseller in 2016. It describes DeLozier's 32-year career dealing with wildlife.

Her medical mystery, Out on a Limb: A Smoky Mountain Mystery (2013), was a USA Today best seller and voted a Best Kindle Book of 2014. The French translation of the book, Suspendue, was shortlisted for the Cognac Thriller Prize, the Prix Polar International. It deals with East Tennessee and the Great Smoky Mountains National Park, with an emphasis on the insular and quirky local culture.

Jourdan's work has been translated into French, German, and Hungarian.

Jourdan is a former Counsel to the United States Senate Committee on Environment and Public Works and the United States Senate Committee on Governmental Affairs. She has degrees from the University of Tennessee in Biomedical Engineering and Law.

== Bibliography ==
=== Nonfiction ===
==== Medical ====
- Heart in the Right Place: A Memoir (2007) ISBN 9781565124875
- Medicine Men: Extreme Appalachian Doctoring (2012) ISBN 9780988564312
- Radiologists at Work: Saving Lives with the Lights Off (2015) ISBN 9780997201215
- Talking to Skeletons: Behind the Scenes With a Radiologist (2015) ISBN 9780997201222
- Nurse: The Art of Caring (2016) ISBN 9780997201246

==== Wildlife ====
- Bear in the Back Seat I: Adventures of a Wildlife Ranger in the Great Smoky Mountains National Park (2013) ISBN 9780988564367
- Bear in the Back Seat II: Adventures of a Wildlife Ranger in the Great Smoky Mountains National Park (2014) ISBN 9780988564374
- Bear Bloopers: True Stories from the Great Smoky Mountains National Park (2014) ISBN 9780989930413
- Waltzing with Wildlife: 10 Things NOT to Do in Our National Parks (2016 ebook) ISBN 9780997201253
- Dangerous Beauty: Stories from the Wilds of Yellowstone (2017) ISBN 9781946299017

==== Writing ====
- How to Write, Edit & Publish Your Memoir: Advice From a Best-Selling Memoirist (2018) ISBN 9781946299093

=== Fiction ===
==== Mystery ====
- Out on a Limb: A Smoky Mountain Mystery (2013) ISBN 9780989930451
- School for Mysteries: A Midlife Fairy Tale Adventure (2014) ISBN 9780989930475
- School for Psychics: A Midlife Fairy Tale Adventure (2014) ISBN 9780997201208
- Breakdown on Blowhard Mountain: A Travel Mystery (2019) ISBN 9781946299116
