= Jourdan Urbach =

Musician and businessman

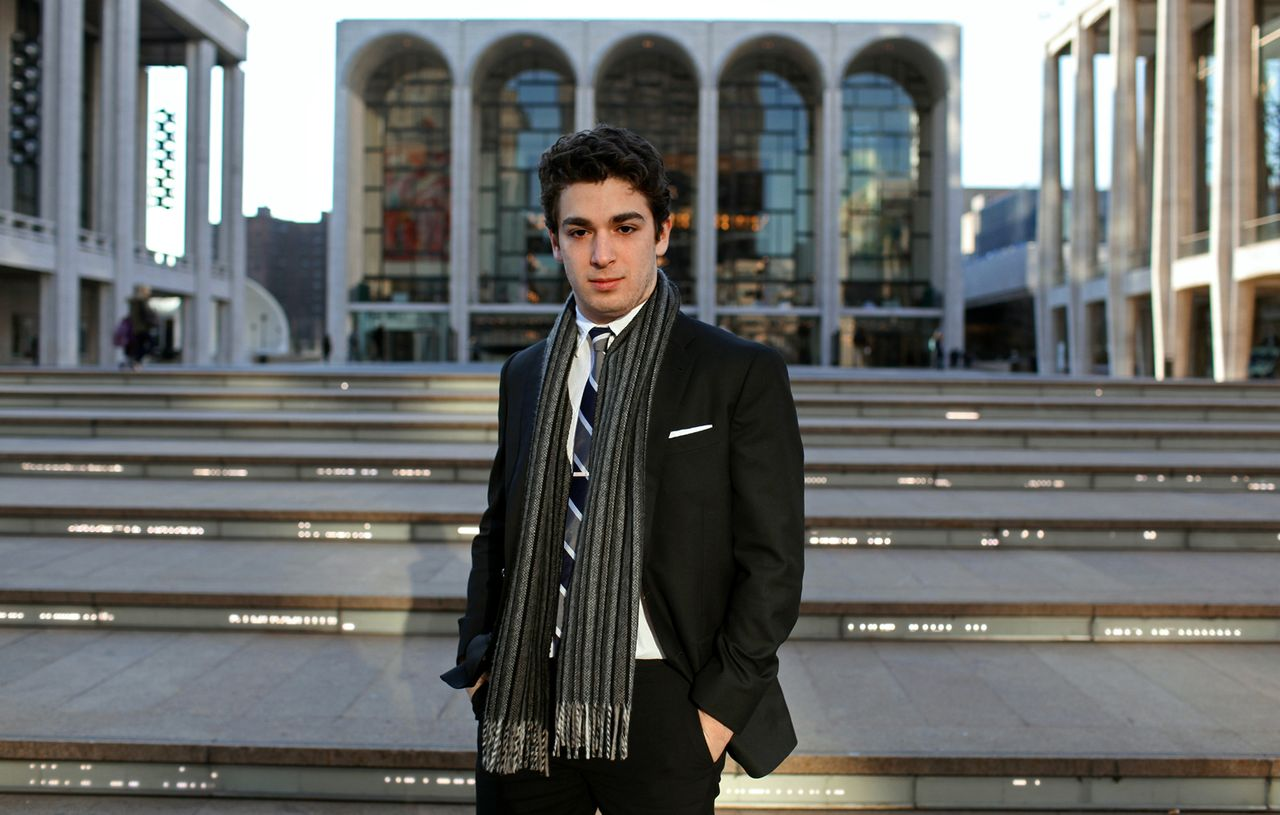
- Born: December 5, 1991 (age 34); Long Island, New York
- Education: Juilliard Pre-College Yale University

Jourdan Urbach (born December 5, 1991) is an American entrepreneur and retired professional violinist/composer. He currently resides in New York City, USA.

== Early life and education ==
Jourdan Urbach was born on December 5, 1991 on Long Island in New York State. Urbach began playing the violin in 1994 at the age of 2 weeks old and was playing professionally by the time he was 7. He made his debut at Carnegie Hall when he was 6 years old.

Urbach founded two non-profits that raise money to fight children's neurological diseases: Children Helping Children and Concerts for a Cure. Children Helping Children is a charity organization that performs at places like Carnegie Hall and Lincoln Center. Concerts for a Cure had raised over $4.7 million dollars by the time Urbach started attending college. Urbach was also involved at an early age in Alzheimer's research at Cold Spring Harbor Laboratory.

Urbach studied at Juilliard School and later enrolled as an undergraduate at Yale, where he graduated with a bachelor's degree in liberal arts. During this time, he wrote the score for the short film "Elah and the Moon," which debuted at the Tribeca Film Festival.

As an undergraduate, Urbach started the International Coalition of College Philanthropists (ICCP). The ICCP is “a council of college-age philanthropic entrepreneurs dedicated to coordinating and maximizing the effectiveness of fundraising operations at college campuses across the world.” Urbach wrote the score for the trailer of the 2012 Columbia Film Festival. Shortly before graduation, he was awarded a National Jefferson Award.

== Later life ==
Urbach later moved back to New York as the National Director of the Jefferson Awards. Urbach has also worked as a Goodwill Ambassador to the UN Arts for Peace Council.
