= Cairo Demographic Center =

Egyptian research institute

The Cairo Demographic Center (CDC) is an educational and research institute in Mokattam, a suburb of Cairo, Egypt. It provides training to specialists in demography in the developing world, who are concerned with the study and analysis of critical population issues.

The CDC awards Diplomas in Demography, Population and Development as well as a M.Phil. degree in Demography. It has one of the richest demographic libraries in the Middle East. It carries out research in areas such as employment, health and reproductive issues.

== History ==
The CDC was jointly established by the United Nations and the Egyptian Government in 1963. The agreement was renewed several times before it was terminated in 1991. A Presidential decree was issued, stating that the Center be an independent institution sponsored and financed by the Egyptian Government. In January 1992, the Egyptian Government took full responsibility for the Center. In 2006 CDC it was affiliated to the Ministry of Economic Development.

== Objectives ==
CDC main objectives are:

a) To provide educational opportunities to persons working in the field of population . b) To undertake research in population and related fields. c) To provide technical assistance and consultancy services in population and related fields to interested governments and organizations. d) To organize national and regional conferences and seminars on population and related issues. e) To plan, organize and conduct short training programmes in population and related fields. f) To carry out follow-up and impact evaluation studies for population projects and programmes.
