= Mahmud Awad =

Egyptian journalist (1942–2009)

- Born: 28 December 1942; Talkha, Dakahlia Governorate, Egypt
- Died: 28 August 2009 (aged 66)
- Occupations: Journalist, writer

Mahmud Awad (Arabic: محمود عوض; 28 December 1942 – 28 August 2009) was an Egyptian journalist and writer, born in the city of Talkha in Dakahlia Governorate.

== Education ==
Due to his excessive love of reading, Awad almost failed his classes, causing him to promise his dad to work hard on himself. Indeed, Awad's father was sent a £E25 paycheque by the Minister of Education, Kamal el-Din Hussein, in acknowledgement to Awad's success. Feeling reassured about his son's future, Awad's father handed the check to his son and left.

Awad enrolled in law school and continued to pursue writing as a hobby. Hence, he joined Akhbar el-Yom foundation, in which he successfully managed to balance between journalism and studying, till he graduated in 1964.

== Career ==
Faced with the decision to choose between working in the Office of the Public Prosecutor or in journalism, Awad chose the latter. He pursued the profession for 8 years, after which he was appointed as the chief news editor.

Awad became one of the most prominent writers in the 1960s, and was named the "Nightingale of the Egyptian Press" by the former editor-in-chief, Ihsan Abdel Quddous. He won this title after proving himself and publishing a great article about Umm Kulthum, after the delay caused by one of the great writers of Akhbar el-Yom newspaper, Anis Mansour, in turning in his daily article. Mansour's repeated delay in his submissions caused problems in printing the paper on its due date, and, thus, lead Abdel Quddous to entrusting Awad with the last page of Akhbar Al-Youm. In fact, because Mansour admired Awad's writings, Mansour sent the last page of the newspaper 3 days earlier than it was due. In addition, Abdel Quddous charged Awad to write a weekly page in the newspaper titled "Personalities," in which he employed his unusual, yet unique, style of writing to narrate stories of intellectual, cultural, political and religious figures in Egypt. Furthermore, he gained a wide recognition for being the only Arab journalist who witnessed the issuance of the United Nations resolution 242 (1967), and the coup attempt by General Mohammad Oufkir against King Hassan II.

Throughout his journey as a journalist, Awad was fortunate to strike up friendships with film celebrities and figures of world literature, including Taha Hussein, Tawfiq al-Hakim and Ahmed Hassan El-Bakoory, as well as the world famous artist Anthony Quinn, which raised a lot of questions at the time. He was submerged by the celebrities’ requests to write about them, some of which he met, resulting in the publication of over 15 books. On the other hand, the Egyptian singer, Umm Kulthum, preferred to have Mustafa Amin as her biographer. However, seeing that Amin, too, was impressed by Awad's work, he nominated Awad for the task. Despite Umm Kulthum's initial reluctance to accept the offer, she changed her thoughts about Awad after reading the book he wrote about her.

In 1977, Awad was barred from his writing profession at Akhbar el-Yom, despite enriching the content of the newspaper and contributing to the increase of its distribution to over a million copy. There were many conflicting reasons regarding Awad's ban, one reason being his opposing views regarding the peace negotiations with Israel, which provoked the authorities. Another reason could be his professional excellence that lead to jealousy among colleagues. As a traveling writer, Awad covered topics from different parts of the world, including the United Nations, and wrote about the life of Egyptians abroad. He was also well known among celebrities and leading Intellectuals. According to the Egyptian journalist, Khairy Hassan, Musa Sabri, who was jealous of Awad's achievements, justified Awad's work trips as absence from work, adding that Awad is a literary editor, not a writer, and, hence, is not entitled to take leave from work for such long periods.

Awad did not let that stop him from pursuing his passion, and started writing for some of the well-known Arab newspapers, including the London-based Al-Hayat international Arab paper, Alqabas Kuwaiti newspaper and Al Riyadh Saudi newspaper, until he was appointed editor-in-chief for Al Ahrar newspaper of the Liberal Party in 1986. He helped increase the distribution of the newspaper by 157,000 in only three months’ time, which was the span of his experience at Al Ahrar. However, as a result of some disagreements between Awad and the Liberal Party, Awad fell ill and self-isolated. Shortly after his recovery, he joined Egypt's Journalists Syndicate council and helped form the building blocks of the syndicate by setting up activities for talented young journalists and rewarding them.

Despite his busy life, Awad refused to be part of any political mainstream or party. The most recent proposal was that made by the former Prime Minister of Egypt, Aziz Sedky, to have Awad join the National Front, to which Awad responded saying that he would not even wish to rule his own street.

== Writings ==
His writings about Umm Kulthum: Before writing about Umm Kulthum, Awad attempted to call the singer a number of times, for the purpose of citing their dialogue in the writing he was composing about Umm Kulthum. Awad was on his way to publishing the article if it wasn't for Abdel Quddous, who prevented him from proceeding. Abdel Quddous's concern revolved around including the telephone conversations without Umm Kulthum's knowing of it. Awad, nevertheless, believed that a celebrity is not entitled to be informed about the content that is written about him or her, seeing that it is part of a writer's freedom, but Abdel Quddous disagreed. Consequently, and as Awad feared, Umm Kulthum raised objections to the opening of their conversation, resulting in Awad insisting on not making any changes to the original version.

With time, Umm Kulthum overlooked the dispute that arose between herself and Awad. In fact, she indirectly apologized for her adamance by praising Awad's work to the founder of Dar Assayad weekly newspaper, Said Fareeha, who agreed to publishing Awad's article. Her appeasements were further proved when she defended Awad for naming the book he composed about her "The Umm Kulthum that No One Knows of," despite the dissatisfaction expressed by her relatives.

His writings about famous musicians: Awad continued to face difficulties in his writing about famous artists and actors, including Mohammed Abdel Wahab, whom he almost as a result of publishing "The Abdel Wahab that No One Knows of" book. Therefore, when other singers, such as Abdel Halim Hafez and Farid al-Atrash, requested to have Awad as their biographer, he politely refused.

Awad announced a change in the course of his career from legacy-writing to political-writing, whilst preserving the bonds of friendship and respect with all the well-known figures and respectable icons with which he's acquainted.

== Death ==
After struggling with his illness, 70-year-old Awad died on 28 August 2009. No one knew about his death until two days later, when he did not show up for his doctor appointment.

== Works ==
Some of Awad's books include:

- “Thoughts Against Lead” (original title: Afkar Did Al-Rasaas), Dar Al-Maarif Bookshop, Cairo, 1972
- "Banned from Circulation" (original title: Mamnue Min Al-Tadawul), Dar El Shorouk, Cairo, 1972.
- "Banned from Circulation 2: Israeli Thoughts" (original title: Mamnue Min Al-Tadawul 2: Afkar Israeliya), Egyptian Radio and Television Union, Cairo, 1973.
- "Top Secret" (original title: Siri Jidaa), Modern Egyptian Bureau, Cairo, 1974.
- "Rebels for the Sake of Allah" (original title: Mutamaridun Li-Wajh Allah), Dar El Shorouk, Cairo, 1986.
- "Peace Be Upon You" (original title: Wa Alaykumu S-Salam), Dar Al-Mustaqbal Al-Arabi, Cairo, 1986.
- "The Umm Kulthum that No One Knows of" (original title: Umm Kulthum Alaty La Ya’rafuha Ahad), Akhbar el-Yom newspaper, Cairo, 1987.
- "The Abdel Wahab that No One Knows of" (original title: Mohammed Abdel Wahab Aladhy La Ya’rafuhu Ahad), Dar Al-Maarif Bookshop, Cairo, 1991.
- "In the Wounded Arabic Language" (original title: B-il Arabi Al-Jarih), Dar Al-Maarif Bookshop, Cairo, 2006.
- "Personalities" (original title: Shakhsiyaat), Dar Al-Maarif Bookshop, Cairo, 2009.
- "From an Heartache" (original title: Min Waja’i Al-Qalb), Dar Al-Maarif Bookshop, Cairo, 2007.
- "The Seventh Day: The Impossible War ... The War of Attrition” (original title: Al-youm Al-Sabei: Al-Harb Al-Mustahila ... Harb Al-Istinzaf), Dar Al-Maarif Bookshop, Cairo, 2010.
