= Alexander Saroukhan =

Armenian-Egyptian cartoonist

Alexander Sarukhan
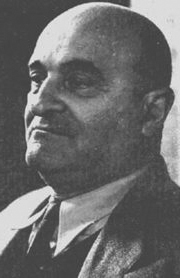
- Born: October 1, 1898; Russian Empire
- Died: January 1, 1977 (aged 78); Cairo, Egypt
- Occupations: cartoonist and caricaturist

Alexander Saroukhan (Armenian: Ալեքսանդր Յակոբի Սարուխան, Arabic: إسكندر صاروخان; October 1, 1898 – 1977) was an Armenian-Egyptian cartoonist and caricaturist whose drawings have appeared in a number of Arabic and international newspapers and magazines. He is considered one of the best and most famous caricaturists in the Arab world.

== Early life ==
In 1908 at age ten he moved to the Ottoman Empire where he studied languages. With his brother Levon Saroukhan, he published a weekly magazine. Later on Saroukhan worked as a translator of Russian, Turkish and English languages in the British army. At the same time, his caricatures were published in Armenian newspapers and magazines, and notably in the satiric paper "Gavrosh." In 1922 he left Turkey to Europe and studied at the Brussels Graphic Art Academy where he excelled and finished his studies in two years instead of the usual four.

== Career ==
In 1924 Saroukhan left for Egypt with more than 125 pieces of his art work. His drawings were published in a satiric magazine called "Armenian Cinema".

Saroukhan presented some of his works at an exhibition in Cairo and then in Alexandria. Through those exhibitions, he met Egyptian journalist Mohamed El-Tabii. Through mutual cooperation, they both became the most important and influential journalists in Egypt for 20 years. Saroukhan worked as a caricaturist for the widely circulated Rose el-Yusuf magazine, where El-Tabii was editor. Saroukhan's drawing of Rose el-Yusuf was his first to appear on the cover of the magazine in March 1928. From then on, Saroukhan became known as a ‘political' caricaturist.

His character "El Masri Efendi" (meaning Egyptian Efendi, المصري أقندي in Arabic) also helped establish his fame. However, because of a dispute between Rose (Fatima) el-Yusuf and Mohamad el-Tabii, Saroukhan left the magazine and joined the staff of another Egyptian well-known paper, Akher Saa (Last Hour), which el-Tabii published until 1946.

When Mohamed El-Tabii sold Akher Saa to Akhbar el-Yom (Today's News in Arabic), Saroukhan moved to the new newspaper and worked for it until his death in 1977.

He established a French-language humor magazine "La Caravane," published between 1942 and 1945. He also contributed to Egypt's foreign language press, with cartoons in "La Presse Egyptienne", "Image" and Armenian daily Arev. He had many exhibitions in Egypt, Lebanon, Syria, Romania.

== Publications ==
Among Saroukhan's publications is Cette guerre (This War in French), in which he warned of the coming of World War II. It is considered to be his finest book as it defined his talents to discover humor in criticism.

The Saroukhan style was prominent, independent and famous as he drew more than 20,000 different caricatures – political, social or humorous. Other publications include "The Political Year 1938," a collection of political caricatures, a book in Armenian on the art of caricature, five satirical plays in Armenian, "Our Seven Deadly Sins", and an article "How I Came to Egypt."

He also drew for republications of two classic works by Armenian satirical writers: Hagop Baronian's "The Honorable Beggars" ("Medzabadiv Muratsganner" in Armenian) and Yervant Odian's "Comrade Panchoonie" ("Enger Panchouni" in Armenian).
