= Sword of Islam (Mussolini) =

Ceremonial weapon of Benito Mussolini

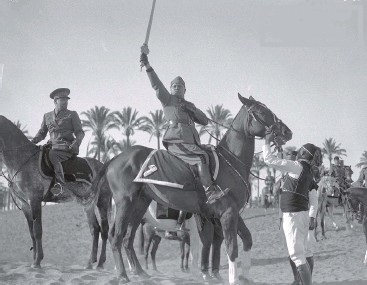
Mussolini on horseback brandishing the sword at Tripoli on 20 March 1937

The Sword of Islam (Arabic: سيف الإسلام, romanized: Sayf al-Islām; Italian: Spada dell'Islam) was a ceremonial weapon given on 18 March 1937 to Benito Mussolini, who was pronounced as the Protector of Islam (Arabic: حامي الإسلام, romanized: Hāmī al-Islām; Italian: Protettore dell'Islam). This was part of a fascist campaign to portray Mussolini as a 'protector of Islam'.

== History ==
In 1934, after the creation of Italian Libya and the Libyan genocide, Mussolini adopted a policy for encouraging comparisons with Islam, calling the local population "Italian Muslims of the fourth shore of Italy", building mosques and Quranic schools, preparing service facilities for the pilgrims going to Mecca and even making a High School of Islamic Culture in Tripoli. Behind the apparent humanitarian intent, the Fascists and some sectors of the Islamic world were recognizing that Mussolini's policy targeted the common enemies of Fascist Italy and Islam, France and the United Kingdom. These common interests were generated from the aversion to the agreements of the Treaty of Versailles of 1919, dominated by France, the United Kingdom and the United States which had neither fully satisfied the requests brought forth by Italy, nor the requests from this part of the Islamic world.

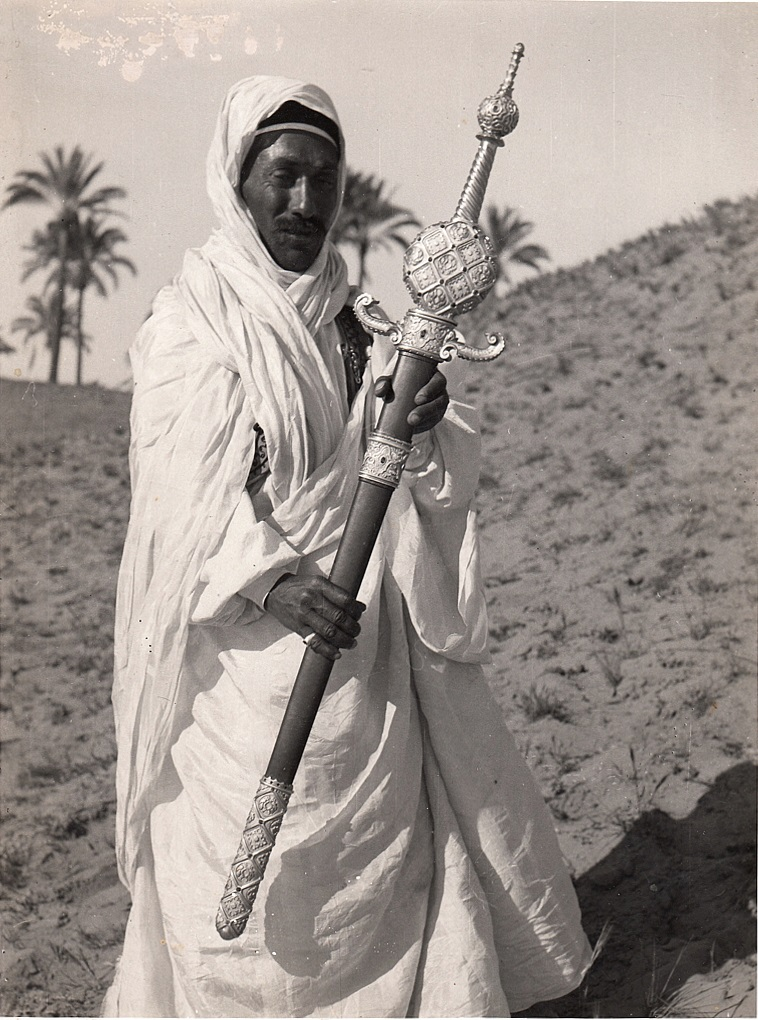
The sword

In order to earn the favour of the Arabs and to seal himself the alliance, Mussolini, although a signatory of the Lateran Treaty with the Holy See, decided to have bestowed on himself the title of Protector of Islam. According to the interpretation of Mussolini, with the Italian government taking over the place of the Ottomans in Libya, such a title was up to him concerning law since, in some manner, he was heir of the authority of the caliph. The visit to Libya was officially to celebrate its three year rule by Italo Balbo, as well as opening the Litoranea highway. On 18 March 1937, in the outskirts of Tripoli, Mussolini received the Sword of Islam from Iusuf Kerisc (Note: Also spelled Yusuf Kerbish), a leading Berber supporter of the Italian occupation against the Libyan resistance, during a lavish ceremony. After entering Tripoli among salutes of cannons and at the head of a rank of 2,600 cavalrymen, Mussolini reaffirmed his closeness to the Muslim population of Libya and Ethiopia, guaranteeing "peace, justice, wellness and respect for the laws of the Prophet". He also visited a mosque in Derna.

The following year, a horse monument was inaugurated in the main square of the Libyan capital in honour of Mussolini. Its base read: "To Benito Mussolini, peacemaker of the people, redeemer of the land of Libya, the mindful population and exhibitions where the Sword of Islam flashed consecrate in the sign of the Lictor a loyalty that challenges the destiny."

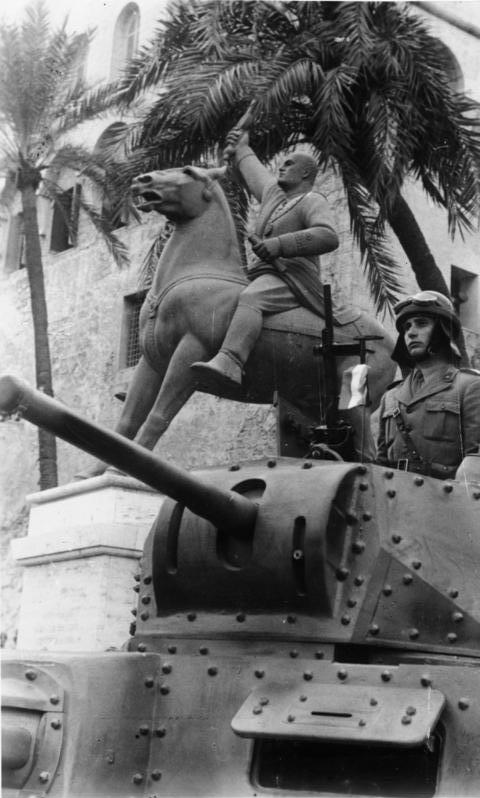
Statue of Mussolini with the sword

The sword, decorated in arabesque, equipped with a double-edged straight blade and with a hilt and solid gold friezes, had been achieved from the art firm Picchiani e Barlacchi di Firenze on the order of Mussolini himself. After 1937, it was no longer used and was guarded in a small glass reliquary at Rocca delle Caminate, summer residence of Mussolini. There were no more signs of the precious object after 25 July 1943, when Rocca delle Caminate was ravaged and plundered by the Italian resistance.

== Reactions ==
In spite of the approval from the media of the regime, the ceremony provoked hilarity among the Italian people because of its absurd and paradoxical connotations. One of the photographs of the event, depicting Mussolini on the saddle of a horse held by the halter by a groom, in his official version was retouched and published deleting the groom, in order to make it appear that Mussolini was able to ride his own mount without anyone's help. The detail is often cited as one of the more typical examples of the art of falsification established in the totalitarian regime.

The 'protector of Islam' message was not positively received in the Arab world. As one Cairo newspaper put it: "Protector of Islam indeed ... we have heard that before. Napoleon said it here, and so did the Kaiser at Damascus. It’s a bad precedent." The rector of Al-Azhar University asserted that only a Muslim could call himself a protector of Islam. After the Italian invasion of Muslim Albania caused another wave of anti-Italian denouncements in the Arab world, Mussolini himself complained to Göring; "Since Italy’s Albanian venture the Arabs were certainly rather doubtful as to his role of Protector, which he had assumed symbolically with the Sword of Islam." Hitler also allegedly complained about Mussolini in the “Political Testament of Adolf Hitler” but this originates from a likely forgery by Francois Genoud.

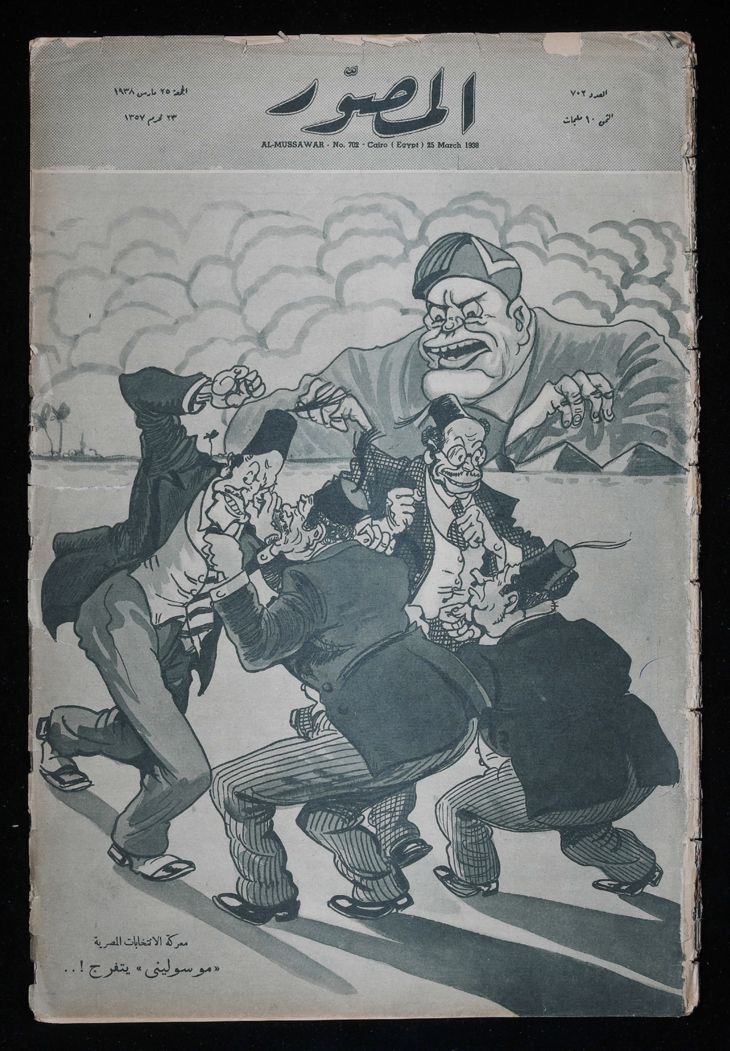
Political cartoon in Al-Musawar showing politicians fighting while a hungry Mussolini looks on the background

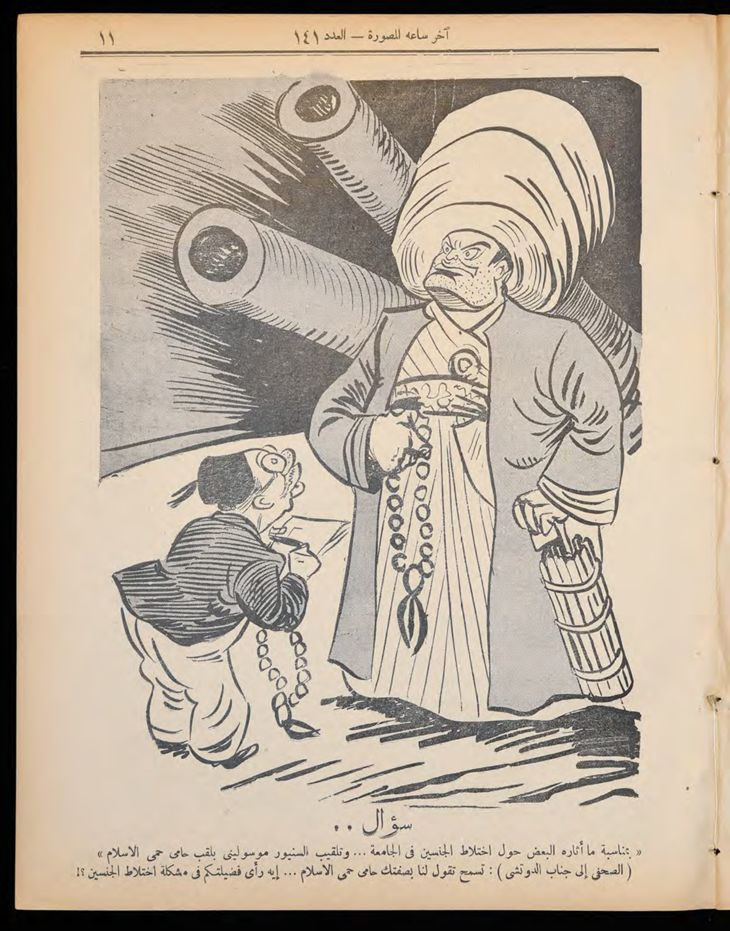
Political cartoon in Akher Saa mocking Mussolini for calling himself the 'protector of Islam'; Masri Effendi (national personification of Egypt) is sarcastically asking Mussolini for his opinion of gender mixing in universities

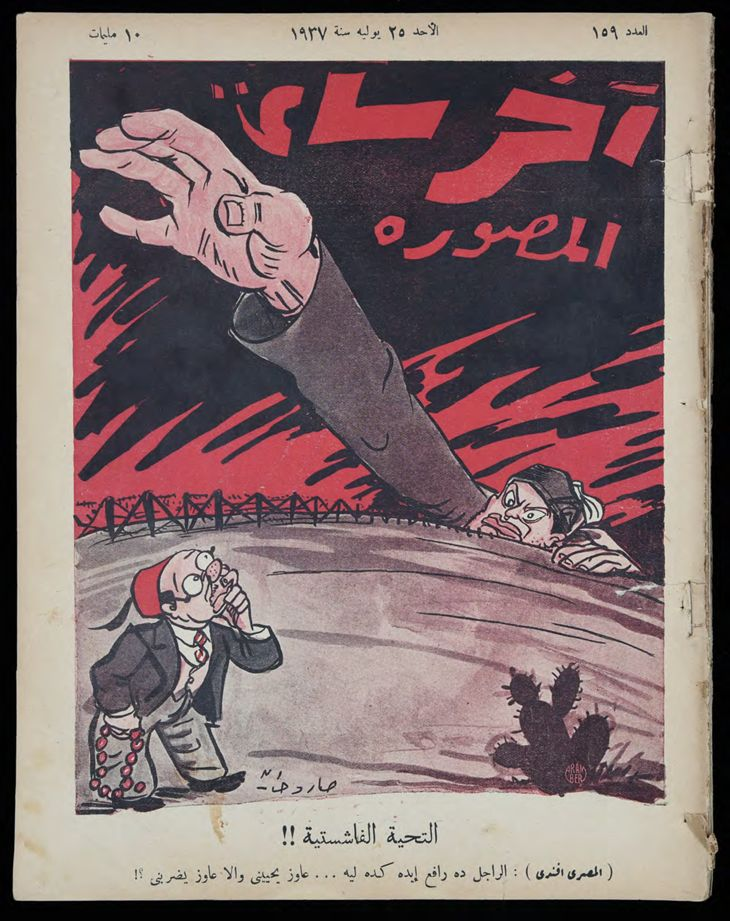
Political cartoon in Akher Saa showing Masri Effendi wary of Benito Mussolini

== Bibliography ==
=== Italian Sources ===
- Antonini, Sandro (1999). De Ferrari (ed.). Catene al pensiero e anelli ai polsi. Genoa, Italy. ISBN 97-88-871722-17-7.
- Cifarelli, Michele (2004). Rubbettino (ed.). Libertà vo' cercando... Diari 1934-1938. Soveria Mannelli, Italy. ISBN 978-88-49806-98-4.
- Ham, Anthony (2007). EDT (ed.). Libia. Turin, Italy. ISBN 978-88-60401-52-6.
- Lanna, Luciano; Rossi, Filippo (2003). Vallecchi (ed.). Fascisti immaginari. Florence, Italy. ISBN 978-88-84270-57-3.
- Randazzo, Antonella (2008). Arterigere (ed.). L'Africa del Duce. I crimini fascisti in Africa. Varese, Italy. ISBN 978-88-89666-27-2.
- Romersa, Luigi (September–October 1994). "Benito e Rachele Mussolini nella tragedia". Storia Verità. No. 17.

=== English sources ===
- Arielli, Nir (2010). "The Protector of Islam, June 1936-—March 1938". Fascist Italy and the Middle East, 1933–40. Palgrave Macmillan. ISBN 9780230281684.
- Burdett, Charles (2010). "Mussolini's Journey to Libya (1937): Ritual, Power and Transculturation". In Andall, Jacqueline; Duncan, Derek (eds.). National Belongings: Hybridity in Italian Colonial and Postcolonial Cultures. Peter Lang.
- Williams, Manuela A. (2006). "Italian activities in Palestine: Mussolini as 'The Sword of Islam'". Mussolini’s Propaganda Abroad: Subversion in the Mediterranean and the Middle East, 1935–1940. Routledge.
- Wright, John L. (2016). "Mussolini, Libya, and the Sword of Islam". In Ben-Ghiat, Ruth; Fuller, Mia (eds.). Italian Colonialism. Springer. ISBN 9781403981585.
