= Rose al Yusuf =

Rose al Yusuf or Rose al-Yūsuf may refer to:

- Rose al Yusuf (journalist) (1898–1958), Lebanese-born Egyptian journalist and stage actress
- Rose al Yusuf (magazine), an Egyptian Arabic weekly political magazine
