= Silk Road Rising =

Theatre company in Chicago, US

- The Silk Road Rising logo.

- The main entrance to the Historic Chicago Temple Building, and to Silk Road Rising.
- Former names: Silk Road Theatre Project
- Address: Chicago, Illinois; United States

Construction
- Opened: 2002

Silk Road Rising is a theatre company located in downtown Chicago dedicated to presenting plays written by individuals of Asian and Middle Eastern descent. Formerly known as Silk Road Theatre Project, the name was changed in 2011 in order to better reflect their mission statement which includes online video plays and documentaries, civic engagement projects, and education programming in addition to live theatre.

The professional Equity theatre is located in Pierce Hall in lower level of the Chicago Temple Building at 77 West Washington Street, directly across from the Richard J. Daley Center.

Silk Road Rising is hosted by the First United Methodist Church upstairs; however, they maintain a secular relationship.

== History ==
Silk Road Rising was founded in 2002 by life-partners Malik Gillani (a Pakistani Muslim) and Jamil Khoury (a Syrian Orthodox Christian) as a proactive, artistic response to the attacks of September 11, 2001. As Khoury wrote, "First Al Qaeda hijacked Islam, then public anger hijacked our citizenship." As 9-11 second responders, Malik and Jamil set out to use storytelling as a means of challenging the hatred and fanaticism fueling both the attacks, and the backlash that quickly ensued. They work to harness the narratives surrounding Silk Road communities by creating live theatre and online video plays that tell stories through primarily Asian American and Middle Eastern American lenses. By representing communities that intersect and overlap, they advance a polycultural worldview.

Silk Road Rising espouses three artistic goals:

1. Advance the creation of and expand access to works of Asian American and Middle Eastern American artists.

2. Deepen understanding of Asian and Middle Eastern cultures within the broader community.

3. Increase access to resources and provide learning opportunities that allow individuals to explore, express and embrace a broader world view.

Since its founding, Silk Road Rising has collaborated with 58 playwrights to produce 24 plays (11 world premieres, 8 commissioned by Silk Road Rising; 9 Midwest premieres; 4 Chicago premieres) and 50 enhanced staged readings.

== Awards ==
The American Theatre Wing awarded Silk Road Rising their National Theatre Company Grant in 2010.

Silk Road Rising's 2011 production of Scorched received three Jeff Awards including Actress in a Supporting Role, Lighting Design and Sound Design.

In 2013, Silk Road Rising received Chicago Sinfonietta's Chairperson's Award for Diversity and Inclusion.

On Friday, May 19, 2013, SAALT (South Asian Americans Leading Together) presented its 2013 ChangeMaker Award to Silk Road Rising in honor of Mosque Alert, "launched on the 10th anniversary of the attacks, is a first of its kind online civic engagement and new play development process that illuminates the challenges faced by Muslim Americans when trying to build houses of worship."

On November 12, 2014, Silk Road Rising was inducted into the Chicago Gay and Lesbian Hall of Fame.

Artistic Director, Jamil Khoury, received the Community Leader Award from the Association for Asian American Studies on April 25, 2015.

== Productions ==
- 2019:
  - Twice, Thrice, Frice... by Fouad Teymour
  - Detour Guide by Karim Nagi
- 2015: Silk Road Solos: A Festival of Solo Performances
- 2014:
  - The Hundred Flowers Project by Christopher Chen
  - Brahman/i by Aditi Brennan Kapil
- 2013:
  - The Lake Effect by Rajiv Joseph
  - Invasion! by Jonas Hassen Khemiri
  - Paulus by Motti Lerner
- 2012:
  - Re-Spiced: A Silk Road Cabaret
  - Night Over Erzinga by Adriana Sevahn Nichols
- 2011: Yellow Face by David Henry Hwang
- 2010:
  - The DNA Trail: A Genealogy of Short Plays about Ancestry, Identity and Utter Confusion
  - Scorched by Wajdi Mouawad
- 2009:
  - Pangs of the Messiah by Motti Lerner
  - Silk Road Cabaret: Broadway Sings the Silk Road
- 2008:
  - Our Enemies: Lively Scenes of Love and Combat by Yussef El Guindi
  - Durango by Julia Cho
  - Yohen by Philip Kan Gotanda
- 2007:
  - Golden Child by David Henry Hwang
  - Merchant on Venice by Shishir Kurup
- 2006:
  - Back of the Throat by Yussef El Guindi
  - Caravaggio by Richard Vetere
- 2005: 10 Acrobats in an Amazing Leap of Faith by Yussef El Guindi
- 2004: Tea by Velina Hasu Houston
- 2003: Precious Stones by Jamil Khoury

=== Online Video Plays & Documentaries ===
- both/and (2011)
- Not Quite White: Arabs, Slavs and the Contours of Contested Whiteness (2012)
- The Balancing Arab (2012)
- Sacred Stages: a Church, a Theatre, and a Story (2014)
- Multi Meets Poly: Multiculturalism and Polyculturalism Go on a First Date (2015)
- Obstacle Course (2019)

== See also ==
- Theatre in Chicago
- Yussef El Guindi
