= Yussef El Guindi =

Egyptian-American playwright (born 1960)

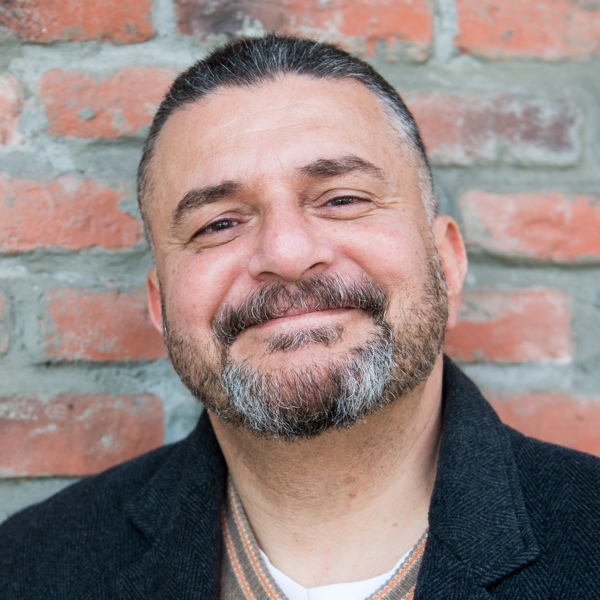
- El Guindi (Ann-Margaret Johnson Photography)
- Born: 1960 (age 65–66); Egypt
- Education: American University in Cairo; Carnegie Mellon University
- Known for: Playwright
- Notable work: Back of the Throat (2005)
- Movement: Arab American theatre
- Relatives: Rose al Yusuf (grandmother); Ihsan Abdel Koudous (uncle)
- Awards: Middle East America Distinguished Playwright Award

Yussef El Guindi (Arabic: يوسف الجندى [ˈjuːsef elˈɡendi]; born 1960) is an Egyptian-American playwright. He writes full-length, one-act, and adapted plays on Arab-Muslim experience in the United States. He is best known for his 2005 play Back of the Throat and has been called "the most talented Arab American writer of political plays."

== Background ==
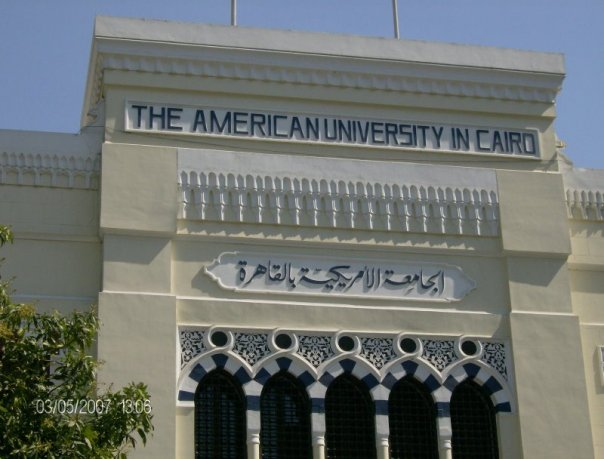
The American University in Cairo, where El Guindi studied in the 1980s

Yussef El Guindi was born in 1960 in Egypt. His grandfather was director Zaki Toleimat, grandmother actress Rose al Yusuf, and his uncle writer Ihsan Abdel Koudous. At the age of three, he moved to London and received schooling in the UK and France. In 1982, he received a BA degree from the American University in Cairo. In 1983, he moved to the United States and received an MFA from Carnegie Mellon University. He then moved to Seattle, Washington, where in 1996 he became a US citizen.

== Career ==
El Guindi became associated with Chicago's "Silk Road Theatre Project" (now Silk Road Rising), which produced three of his plays in quick succession. He became playwright-in-residence at Duke University, where he also taught playwriting for seven years.

After the attacks of September 11, 2001, interest in Arab American theatre grew. In 2005, his play Back of the Throat premiered, confronting anti-Arab sentiment in the US, and received notice from theatres, press, and academia.

Formerly literary manager in the early 2000s, El Guindi became an artistic associate at the Golden Thread Productions in San Francisco in the 2010s. In 2018, he also became a Core Company playwright member of ACT Theatre (Seattle).

Theatres that have produced El Guindi's plays include: The Fountain Theatre (Los Angeles), Furious Theatre Company (Pasadena), Artists Repertory Theatre (Portland), Portland Center Stage (Portland), ACT Theatre (Seattle), The Wilma Theater (Philadelphia), and Mosaic Theater Company (Washington DC). James Faerron has designed sets for his plays.

== Awards ==
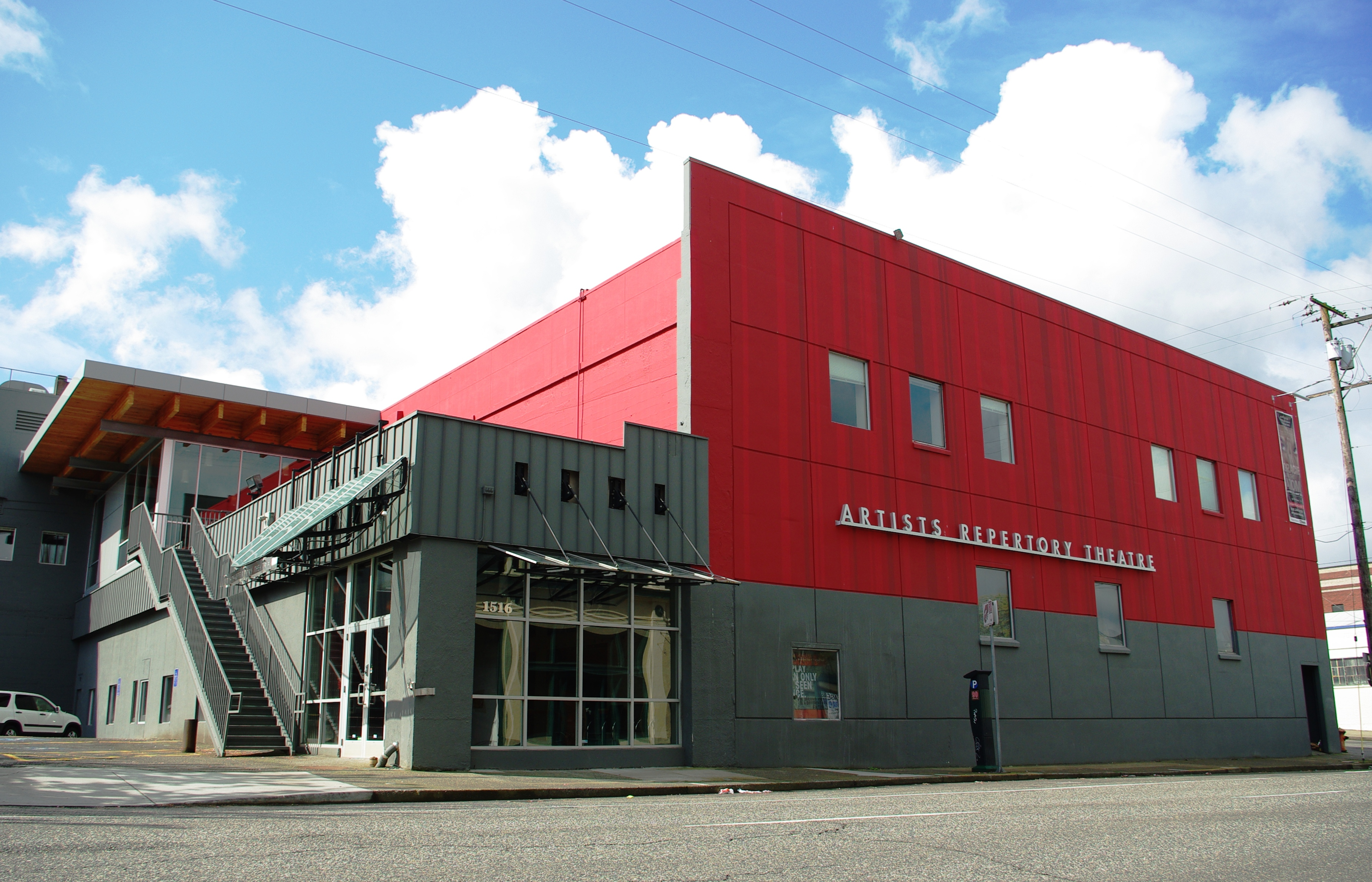
The Artists Repertory Theatre (Portland) showed El Guindi's plays The Talented Ones during its 2016–17 season

- 2004: Northwest Playwrights' Competition from Theater Schmeater for Back of the Throat
- 2005: Best New Play of 2005 by the Seattle Times for Back of the Throat
- 2006:
  - After Dark/John W. Schmid Award for 10 Acrobats in an Amazing Leap of Faith
  - Excellence in Playwriting Award by LA Weekly for Back of the Throat
- 2009: M. Elizabeth Osborn Award from ACTA for Our Enemies: Lively Scenes of Love and Combat
- 2010:
  - Middle East America Distinguished Playwright Award
  - Edgerton Foundation New American Plays Award for Language Rooms
- 2011:
  - Gregory Award for Pilgrims Musa and Sheri in the New World
  - Footlight Award for Best World Premiere Play from the Seattle Times for Pilgrims Musa and Sheri in the New World
- 2012: Harold and Mimi Steinberg/ATCA New Play Award from ACTA forPilgrims Musa and Sheri in the New World
- 2015:
  - Stranger Genius Award
  - Best Original Script for Portland's Drammys for Threesome
- 2016: Santa Barbara Independent Indy Award for The Talented Ones
- 2023: Elected a Royal Society of Literature International Writer

== Works ==
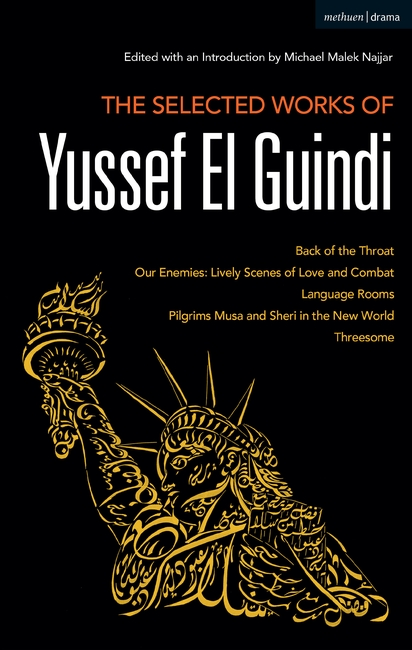
Cover of the 2019 book The Selected Works of Yussef El Guindi (Bloomsbury)

"Guindi's works focus on themes of the immigrant experience, cultural and political climates, and current issues facing Arab-Americans and Muslim Americans." El Guindi himself says that his plays may "pick Arab American or Muslim American characters... but they are essentially immigrant stories." In analyzing his work, Anneka Esch-Van Kan wrote:

Language in El Guindi’s plays is the basis of any construction of reality. While language as a general capacity to speak and as a system of signs is the basis of all distinctions, the differences between several languages play an important role as well. The language one speaks determines one’s perspective on the world, and the translation of meaning from one language into another never works out with complete clarity.

Broadway Play Publishing, Dramatists Play Service and Theatre Forum have published El Guindi's plays.

Plays:

- Hostages and Finishing School (undated)
- Back of the Throat (2005)
- 10 Acrobats in an Amazing Leap of Faith (2005)
- Jihad Jones and the Kalashnikov Babes (2008)
- Our Enemies: Lively Scenes of Love and Combat (2008)
- Language Rooms (2010)
- Pilgrims Musa and Sheri in the New World (2011)
- Threesome (2015)
- Collaborator (2016)
- The Talented Ones (2016)
- People of the Book (2019)

Books:

- Such a beautiful voice is Sayeda's and Karima's city (2006)
- Back of the Throat (2006)
- Jihad Jones and the Kalashnikov Babes (2014)
- Pilgrims Musa and Sheri in the New World (2014)
- Threesome (2016)
- Collaborator (2017)
- Hostages (2018)
- Ten Acrobats in an Amazing Leap of Faith (2018)
- The Talented Ones (2018)
- The Selected Works of Yussef El Guindi (2019)

== Translations ==
Ebtessam El Shokrofy translated Yussef El Guindi's Back of Throat into Arabic. It is published by State Publishing House in 2018. In addition, Abanoub Wagdy produced the translation of El Guindi's Ten Acrobats into Arabic. The translation was published by Anglo Egyptian Bookshop in 2022. Thus, El Guindi's works have hitherto had only two Arabic translations.

== Miscellaneous ==
Actor-director Orson Welles, director Howard Hawks, and writer William Faulkner visited El Guindi's family home.

Sometimes his name is transliterated from Arabic into English with the surname hyphenated: "Yussef El-Guindi".

== See also ==
- Back of the Throat
- Silk Road Theatre Project
- Golden Thread Productions
- List of Stranger Genius Awards winners
- Rose al Yusuf
- Ihsan Abdel Koudous
- Karim Alrawi
- Ra'ouf Mus'ad
- Sabrina Mahfouz
- Safaa Fathy
- Sara Shaarawi
