= Mohamed El-Tabii =

Egyptian political writer and journalist

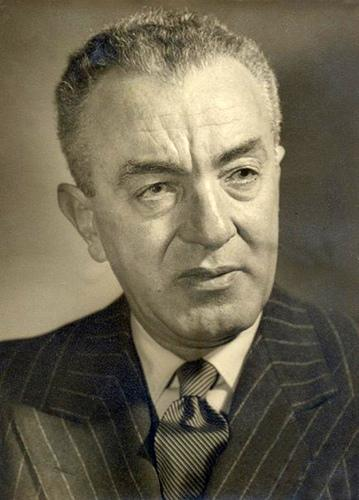
Mohamed El-Tabii

Mohamed El-Tabii (Arabic: محمد التابعى [mæˈħæmmad etˈtæbʕi]; 18 May 1896 in Port Said – 24 December 1976 in El Senbellawein) was a leading Egyptian political writer, journalist and a pioneer of modern press in Egypt and the Arab World, so much so that he was dubbed "Prince of Journalism".

== Biography ==
Mohamed El Tabii or "El Ostaz" as he became later known among his peers and colleagues, first joined Rose al-Yūsuf in 1923, where he made many changes that brought it to the front line as a leading political magazine.

In 1934, he founded the weekly magazine Akher Saa which became the leading magazine in fast news with political jokes and caricatures. He later sold it Akhbar El Yom press group and it continues to be published by that group.

El Tabii was also co-founder of Al Misri newspaper with Mahmud Abu al-Fath.
