= Ahmed Hamroush =

- Born: September 4, 1921. Beni Suef
- Died: October 28, 2011 (aged 90); Zamalek, Cairo
- Occupations: Publicist, Journalist, Historian
- Writing career
- Language: Arabic

Ahmed Hamroush (أحمد حمروش; 4 September 1921 - 28 October 2011) was an Egyptian journalist, historian and a Free Officer, who became the editor-in-chief of several Egyptian newspapers post-July 1952 Revolution such as at-Tahrir and Rose al-Yusuf.
