= Masri Effendi =

National personification of Egypt

Masri Effendi ( مصري أفندي, Mr. Egyptian in Arabic) was a national personification of the Kingdom of Egypt created by Alexander Saroukhan for Ruz al Yusuf in 1930. Masri Effendi is a short man with a fez and sibha (prayer beads) along with Western trousers and a jacket glasses, often giving some witty remark over the political situation as a government bureaucrat. He represented the effendi, the professional middle class of Egypt during its liberal period. He fell out of favor by the 1952 Egyptian revolution, as his character became archaic for modern Egypt.

== History ==
Masri Effendi was created by Ruz al Yusuf to rival al-Kashkul, a competitor satirical newspaper. Masri Effendi was meant to represent the modern Egyptian man who dressed in western jackets and pants but still wore his fez and carried his prayer beads with pride. The term 'effendi' was originally an old Ottoman title, which evolved to refer to the new nationally conscious society of lawyers, university graduates and small merchants. Later on, Masri Effendi would 'write' weekly columns himself, as Ruz al Yusuf presented him as the real editor of the newspaper. Saroukhan would later draw Masri Effendi in Akher Sa'a, another popular satirical magazine. The story of El-Misri (Mr. Egyptian) was later depicted a 1949 film directed by Hussein Sedki. He was gradually phased out because his character was not seen as representative of the Egyptian.

== Gallery ==
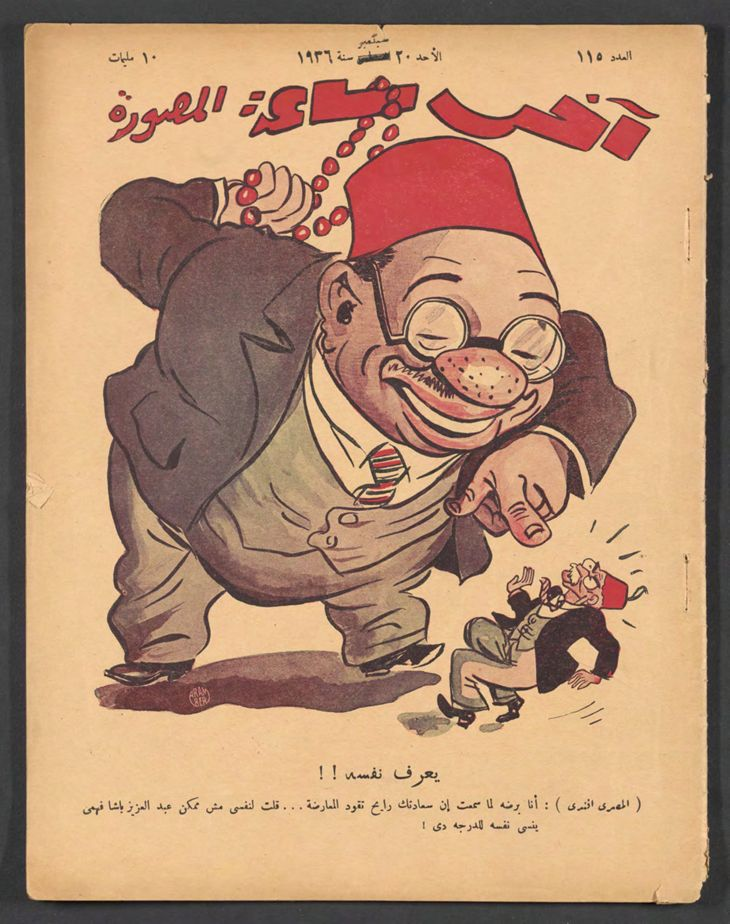
Masri Efendi mocking a politician for suggesting he will lead the opposition - despite his party winning 4 seats in the 1936 Egyptian parliamentary election

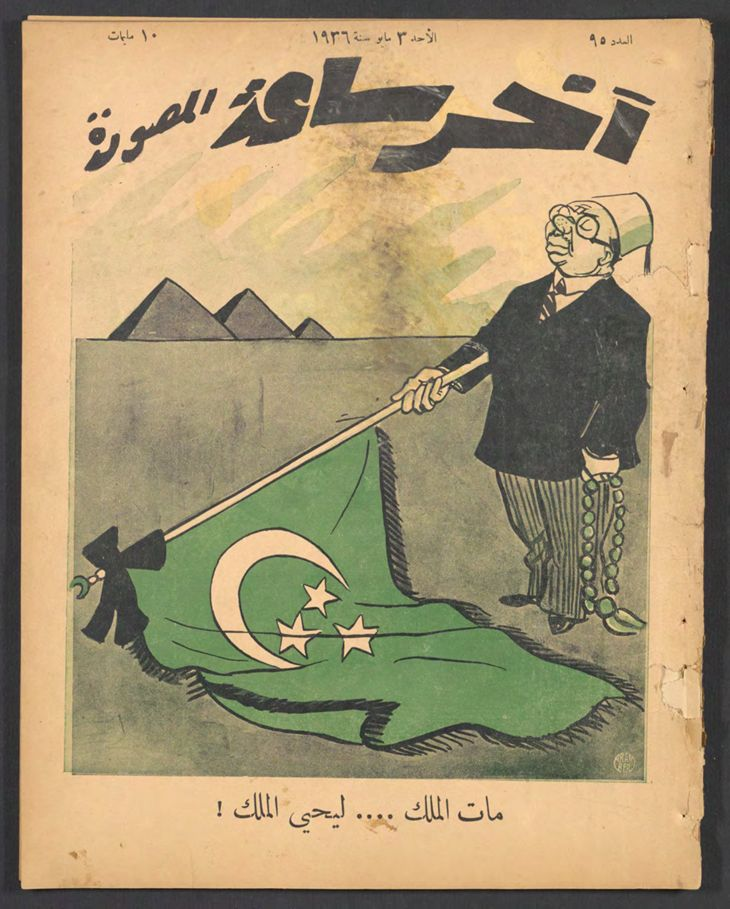
Masri Effendi paying respects to King Fuad after his death

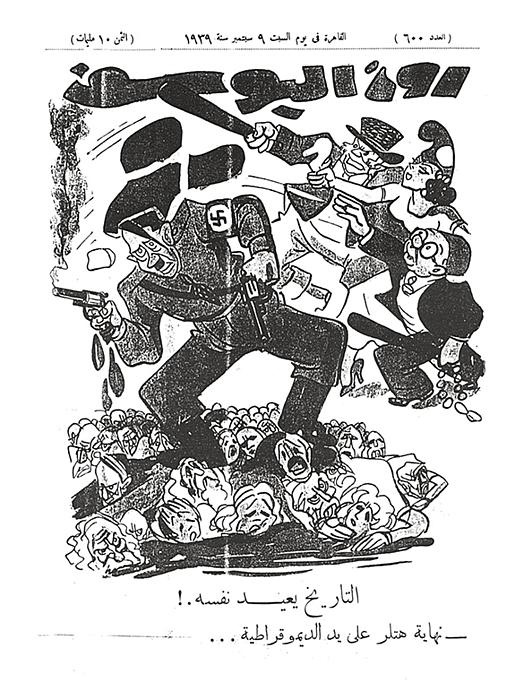
Ruz al-Yusuf reacting to the outbreak of the Second World War on September 9, 1939, showing John Bull and Marianne with Masri Effendi fighting Hitler

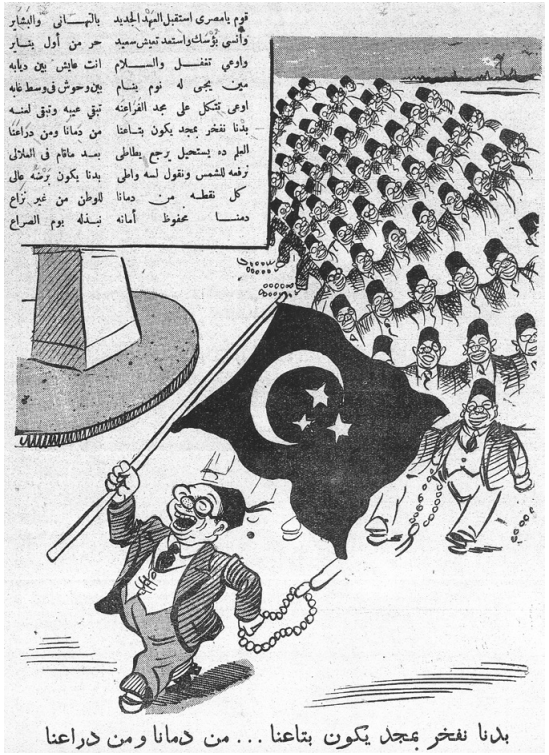
Cartoon in Akher Saa celebrating the ratification of the Anglo-Egyptian treaty; an army of Masri Effendis march with the flag

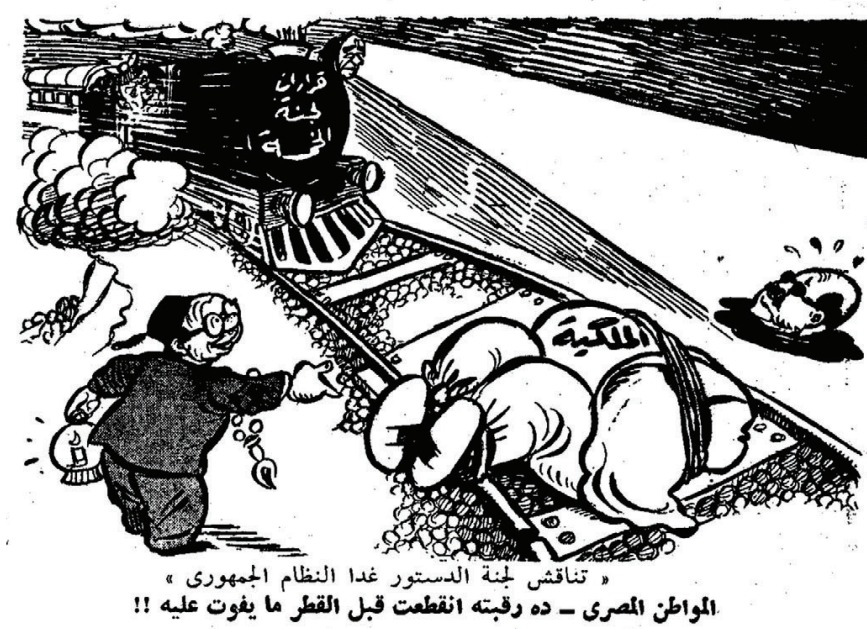
The vote to abolish the monarchy was taken after King Farouk was overthrown. Masri Effendi is joking that Farouk lost his head before the train even hit him. This is one of the last appearances of Masri Effendi in the Egyptian Press

== Sources ==
- Zdafee, Keren (2020). "Between Imagined and 'real': Sarukhan's Al-masri Effendi Cartoons in the First Half of the 1930s". In Scully, Richard; Varnava, Andrekos (eds.). Comic Empires: Imperialism in Cartoons, Caricature, and Satirical Art. Manchester University Press. doi:10.7765/9781526142955.00015. ISBN 9781526142948.
- ———————— (2020a). "The Average Egyptian; the Ideal Egyptian: Al-Miṣrī Efendi". Cartooning for a Modern Egypt. Brill Publishers. pp. 122–136. ISBN 9789004410374.
