= National Council on Canada-Arab Relations =

Canadian nonprofit organization

- Abbreviation: NCCAR
- Formation: 1985
- Founded at: Canada
- Type: Non-profit
- Website: www.nccar.ca

The National Council on Canada-Arab Relations (NCCAR) is a non-profit organization dedicated to building bridges of understanding and cooperation between Canada and the Arab world.

NCCAR's primary objectives are to work with governments, the private sector and community organizations to promote and assist programs that increase Canadian awareness and knowledge of the Arab world, and to encourage the expansion of commercial, scientific, educational and cultural links between Canadian and Arab institutions. NCCAR's objectives are achieved through the promotion of the three following beliefs: Canada and the Arab world share aspirations for world peace, Canada and the Arab world have a common interest in increasing trade, and that Canada and the Arab world desire expanded cultural and educational ties.

== NCCAR's activities ==
- Promoting greater recognition of the social, economic, political and cultural contribution of Arab-Canadians to Canada
- Making information related to the Arab world available to individuals, organizations, educational institutions, libraries, media and Canadian provincial and federal governments
- Publishing a monthly newsletter and a quarterly journal (Arabica), which highlights our organizational achievements, current political and economic issues relating to Canada and the Arab world and to the Arab-Canadian community, educational programs, and upcoming events
- Sponsoring study tours and speaker tours between Canada and the Arab world
- Supporting cultural and historical exhibitions between Canada and the Arab world.
