= Furious Theatre Company =

Theater company in Pasadena, California

Furious Theatre Company was a theater company in Pasadena, California, founded in 2001, that performed until at least 2014. From 2004 to 2011, they presented work as a theater in residence at the Pasadena Playhouse's Carrie Hamilton Theater.

== Company history ==
Furious Theatre Company was founded in 2001 by Sara Hennessy, Shawn Lee, Vonessa Martin, Eric Pargac, Brad Price and Dámaso Rodríguez. In 2002, they began presenting plays on the former factory loading dock in Pasadena, California. The company configured the free city-owned space into a black box theatre. Their first production was Paul Slabolepszy's Saturday Night at the Palace. The company lost the use of the space in 2003.

In 2004, Furious entered a rent-free partnership with the Pasadena Playhouse to perform at their black box Balcony Theatre (renamed the Carrie Hamilton Theater in 2006). Furious's residency there began in October of that year with the first U.S. production of Owen McCafferty's Scenes from the Big Picture. When the Playhouse went bankrupt in 2010 and ceased operations, Furious raised money to cover the rent for the Hamilton, which was leased by the Playhouse from a private landlord, and continued to perform there. After producing 17 premieres there, Furious's residency at the Playhouse ended in 2011. Among its productions at the Carrie Hamilton were Neil Labute’s The Shape of Things, Yussef El Guindi’s Back of the Throat, and Craig Wright's Grace, which won awards for Best Production, Best Director, Best Playwright at the Los Angeles Drama Critics Circle Awards.

The company's first post-Playhouse production was in February 2012, No Good Deed by Matt Pelfrey at [INSIDE] the Ford at the Ford Theatre directed Rodríguez. The company also performed at the Boston Court Pasadena, with whom they had previously co-produced. Rodríguez stepped down as co-artistic director of Furious at the end of 2012 to become artistic director of Artists Repertory Theatre in Portland, Oregon, where he directed a co-production between Artists Rep and Furious Theatre of Dawn King's Foxfinder. Furious returned to the Carrie Hamilton Theater in November 2013 with a production of Johnna Adam's Gideon's Knot, followed by the co-production of Foxfinder in January 2014.
