= Dámaso Rodríguez =

- Born: Miami, Florida, U.S.
- Education: Texas A&M University (BA)

Dámaso Rodríguez is an American theater director. Since July 2023, he has been artistic director of Seattle Repertory Theatre. From 2013 to 2021, he was Artistic Director of Artists Repertory Theatre in Portland, Oregon. In 2001, he co-founded the Furious Theatre Company in Los Angeles, CA, with whom he was co-artistic director through 2012. From 2007 to 2010, he was associate artistic director at the Pasadena Playhouse.

== Career ==
Rodríguez has directed plays at Oregon Shakespeare Festival, The Actors Theatre of Louisville, Pasadena Playhouse, Intiman Theatre, Portland Center Stage, GabelStage, Furious Theatre, A Noise Within

He was one of the 21 honorees in Portland Monthly's annual "Knowledge Universe Rising Stars" in 2014.
