= Karim Alrawi =

Writer and playwright

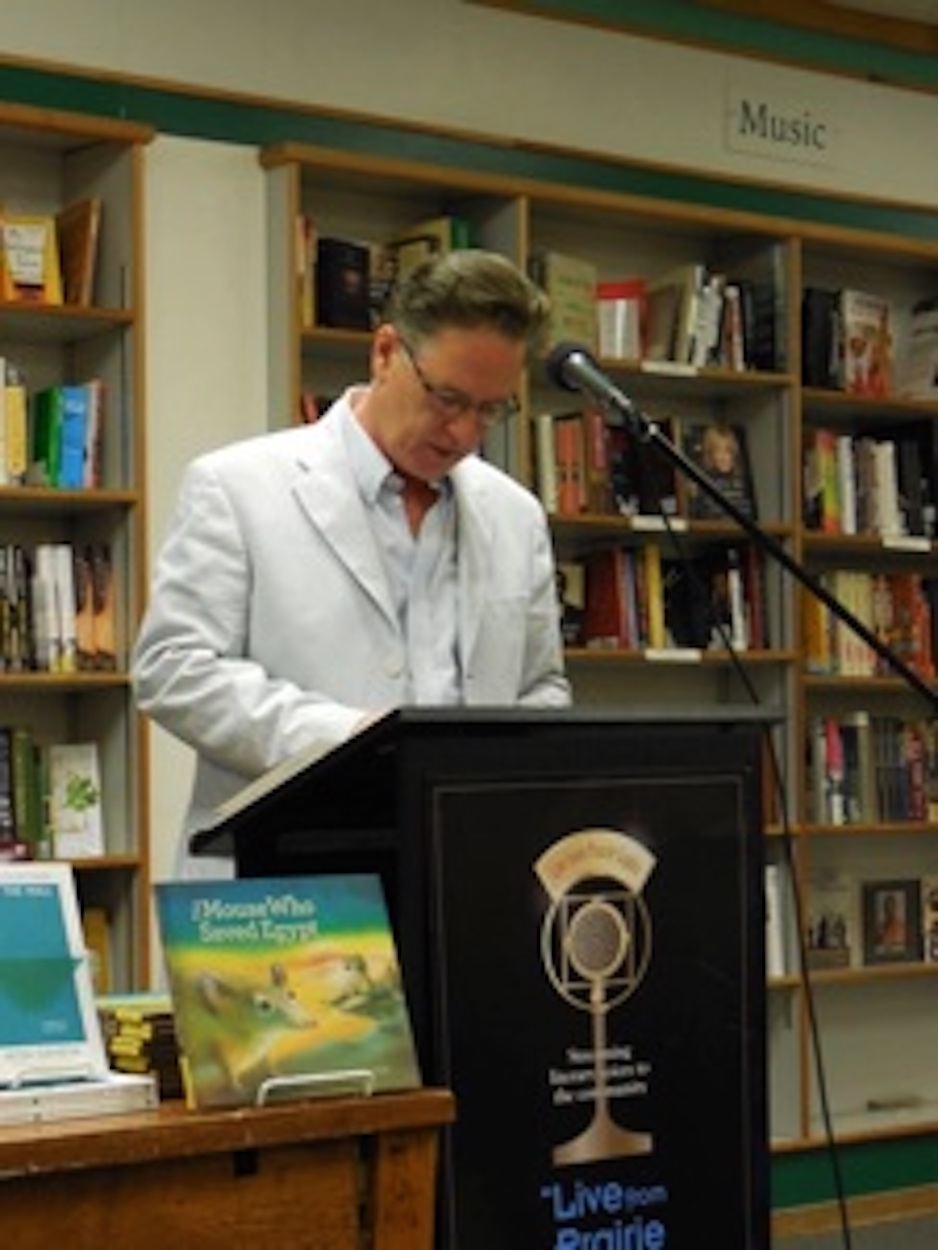
- Reading at Prairie Lights bookstore, Iowa City, Iowa, 2016
- Born: 1964 (age 61–62); Alexandria, Egypt
- Occupations: Writer, playwright
- Writing career
- Genres: Literary Fiction, Children's fiction, Plays for stage, radio and television
- Notable works: Migrations, Child in the Heart, Promised Land, The Unbroken Heart, Deep Cut, Madinat al-Salam
- Website: www.karimalrawi.com

Karim Alrawi (Arabic: كريم الراوي) is a writer born in Alexandria, Egypt. He has taught at universities in the UK, Egypt, US and Canada including at the American University in Cairo, Penn State University, Oakland University, University of Victoria and the University of British Columbia. He was an International Writing Fellow at the University of Iowa and taught creative writing at the university's International Writing Program.

While in the UK, he was active in the anti-racist movement, writing for publications including those of the Campaign Against Racism and Fascism and, in 1984, was a speaker at the Greater London Council's anti-racism conference. He is a long-time peace activist and proponent of a Palestinian state. He was a keynote speaker, in 1982, at the founding conference of the Palestine Solidarity Campaign in London. In 2003, he testified before the US Congress making the case for strengthening civil society institutions and supporting independent media in the Middle East and North Africa. He was also a delegate to Madrid+15 conference in 2007 to develop a framework for a two-state solution, laying the groundwork for the Annapolis Conference between Israeli Prime Minister Ehud Olmert and Palestinian Authority President Mahmoud Abbas.

In Egypt he was deputy secretary general and foreign press spokesperson for the Egyptian Organization for Human Rights (EOHR) and president of Egyptian Pen (the local branch of the international writer's organization) from 1992 to 1994 replacing Mursi Saad El-Din. He was followed in the position by novelist Gamal El-Ghitani.

He was in Egypt during the Arab Spring uprisings of 2011–2013 collecting information on casualties and arrests working with the Egyptian Organisation for Human Rights, as well as assisting the foreign media reporting on events in and around Tahrir Square. After the return of military rule, Alrawi was among 190 leading Egyptian human rights and civil society activists charged by Egypt's State Security Investigations Service under case 173–2011. The charges pertained to his previous advocacy work with the EOHR, his assistance to the foreign media reporting on the uprising, and his initiation and supervision of the training of local journalists in media ethics, democracy and use of the internet, purportedly all contributory factors to the Arab Spring 2011 uprising. On December 20, 2018, an Egyptian court dismissed the charges. The decision was confirmed by the court of appeal on December 4, 2020. On March 20, 2024, an investigative judge declared the case closed. In April 2026, he was a signatory to the Defend Our Juries letter to the British Court of Appeal supporting Palestine Action’s right to peaceful protest and a fair and juried trial.

== Biography ==
Alrawi is a graduate of University College London, the University of Manchester and the University of British Columbia School of Creative Writing.

In the UK, he was Literary Manager of the Theatre Royal Stratford East and later Resident Writer at the Royal Court Theatre in Central London. He served on the Arts Council of Great Britain's Drama Panel and the Greater London Arts Council. On returning to Egypt he taught in the theatre department of the American University in Cairo. In Egypt his plays were banned by the state censor. He was later arrested and detained for interrogation by Egyptian State Security for his work with the Egyptian Organisation for Human Rights (EOHR). In 1993, al-Gama'a al-Islamiyya issued a fatwa against him, citing his defence of the assassinated writer Farag Foda and stating that "the defence of an apostate is proof of apostasy". The fatwa was subsequently rescinded after the intervention of the Egyptian Organization for Human Rights.

He went to the United States as a Fulbright International Scholar where he had residencies at a number of theatres including Meadow Brook Theatre (MBT) in Michigan, Oregon Shakespeare Festival, Kennedy Center, Washington DC, and LaMama, New York. He has written and edited several international publications and was Editor in Chief of ARABICA magazine, the leading nationally distributed Arab-American publication with an independently certified readership of over 100,000 readers. He supervised EU, US and Canadian government funded media training programs in North Africa and South Asia. He was Executive Director of the US-Arab Economic Forum and a member of the Canadian delegation led by Foreign Minister Pierre Pettigrew to the Organisation for Economic Co-operation and Development (OECD) conference on Good Governance in the Arab World, as well as a member of the United Nations Development Programme (UNDP)'s Programme on Governance in the Arab Region (POGAR, 1999–2005) and Communications Advisor and Manager of External Affairs for the Middle East and North Africa for the World Bank in Washington, DC.

== Awards ==
Alrawi's fiction, plays and productions have received several awards including:

- The HarperCollins Publishers Prize for Best New Fiction, Canada
- The Wallace Stegner Award for the Arts, Canada
- The John Whiting Award, British and Commonwealth distinctive contribution to theatre, UK
- The Samuel Beckett Award, for innovation and excellence in writing for the performing arts, UK
- Edinburgh Festival Fringe First Award, outstanding new stage play, UK
- Festival of Asia Writer's Award (Commonwealth Institute, London), most promising new playwright, UK
- Twice recipient of the Egyptian Ministry of Culture Theatre and Youth Award, Egypt
- Jessie Richardson Theatre Award, Canada
- National Playwriting Award, Canada
- USA Plays Today Award, USA
- The Free Press Theatre Excellence Award, Michigan, USA

He has received writer's awards from the Arts Council of Great Britain and from the Canada Council for the Arts.

== British plays ==
Karim Alrawi with Leo Wringer and Joint Stock theatre receives Edinburgh Fringe First Award, 1985, Edinburgh, Scotland

Alrawi's first full-length play Migrations was produced at the Theatre Royal Stratford East and his second play A Colder Climate was produced at the Royal Court Theatre in Central London. It was followed by three plays, Fire in the Lake, A Child in the Heart and Promised Land for Joint Stock Theatre, then one of Britain's major touring companies. All three plays provoked controversy at the time of performance. As Carol Woddis noted about Child in the Heart, "this almost messianic piece about the desperate pain of loss of roots and, in the truly biblical sense, tribal identity, refuses to let its audience off the hook." Fire in the Lake was awarded an Edinburgh Fringe First Award at the Edinburgh Festival Fringe. Crossing the Water a play about the British in Egypt and the Suez War was given a stage reading at the ICA in London before being produced at the American University in Cairo's Jamil Center despite a banning order by the Egyptian state censor.

Alrawi's play Blind Edge, produced by the Old Vic Theatre, was staged at the Commonwealth Institute in London as part of the Festival of Asia, while his play Aliens won the Festival of Asia & Capital Radio's National Playwriting Award.

Theatres Alrawi wrote plays for included Royal Court Theatre, Theatre Royal Stratford East, Joint Stock, The Old Red Lion Theatre, Soho Theatre, M6 Theatre, Half Moon Theatre, Newcastle Playhouse, the Old Vic Theatre, London, Liverpool Playhouse, Theatre Royal, York, the Crucible Theatre in Sheffield and the Mandala Theatre Company in Oxford.

== Arabic plays ==
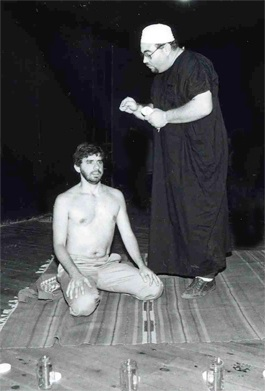
City of Peace (Arabic stage play) with Mahmoud El Lozy and Tamim Abdu, Cairo 1990.

In Egypt, Alrawi taught at the theatre department of the American University in Cairo (AUC). His first serious run-in with the state censor was when his play Crossing the Water was banned and he was summoned to give an account of himself to the censor's office. Later that year, as a response to the censor, he adapted The Three Sisters by Anton Chekhov, setting it in contemporary Egypt. It was staged at the Wallace Theatre of AUC in central Cairo. Also, Alrawi wrote four stage plays in Arabic two of which were staged at the Wallace Theatre. Madinate el Salam (City of Peace) is a retelling of the life of the Sufi poet Mansour al-Hallaj who was executed in tenth century Baghdad on charges of heresy. The play was produced twice, both times after being refused a license by the state censor that led to threats of arrest of Alrawi by state security. The second produced play, Al-Bayt al Mahgour (The Abandoned House) was about sexual exploitation and its roots in Egypt's history of class privilege. The production of the plays, despite being denied rehearsal and production licenses by the state censor, was a contributory cause to Alrawi's later arrest and interrogation by State Security.

Autobis al Intikhabat (The Election Bus), a satire on the Egyptian electoral system and Mudun Gha'iba (Absent Cities) about the destruction of Arab cities by war were two full-length plays that were to be produced with a cast of students from AUC. Alrawi and his actors were denied access to the Wallace theatre during the final days of rehearsals resulting in cancellation of the performances. The Election Bus was later broadcast by the BBC in an English language translation.

He has collaborated with Palestinian theatre groups, including al-Harah and Misahati, writing children's plays touring the Occupied Territories, as well as led theatre and storytelling workshops for Palestinian children. He was translator and dramaturge for the showcase of new Palestinian playwrights held at the Royal Court Theatre in 2000. Later, he was the lead faculty at the University of Iowa's Between the Lines Program teaching creative writing to writers from West Asia and North Africa writing in Arabic.

== North American plays ==
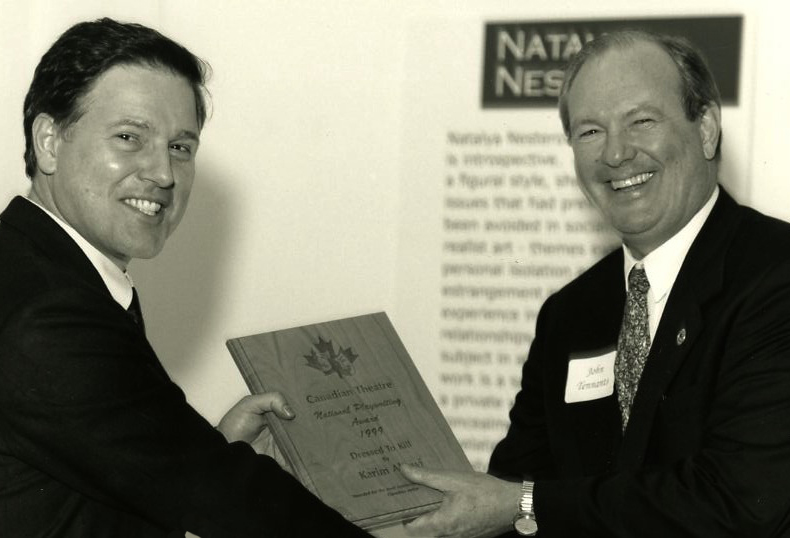
Karim Alrawi receives Canadian National Playwriting Award, 1999, from John Tennant, Canadian Consul, USA

Karim Alrawi was resident writer at a number of institutions, including Iowa State University, Pennsylvania State University, The Oregon Shakespeare Festival, Oakland University and at Meadow Brook Theatre (MBT) in Michigan. He taught playwriting at the University of Victoria and the University of British Columbia both in Canada. He was an International Writing Fellow at the International Writing Program at the University of Iowa, where he taught creative writing and global literature courses for the Between the Lines program.

The Unbroken Heart a play based on the life of the blues singer Ethel Waters was first performed at the Fisher Theatre in Iowa before touring nationally. His plays for MBT included A Gift of Glory, about the Mexican artist Diego Rivera and the Ford family; Chagall's Arabian Nights, a story of Marc Chagall's painting of the Arabian Nights and Killing Time, a play about physician assisted suicide. He also wrote plays that toured local schools and ran theatre workshops for disadvantaged children in South-East Michigan.

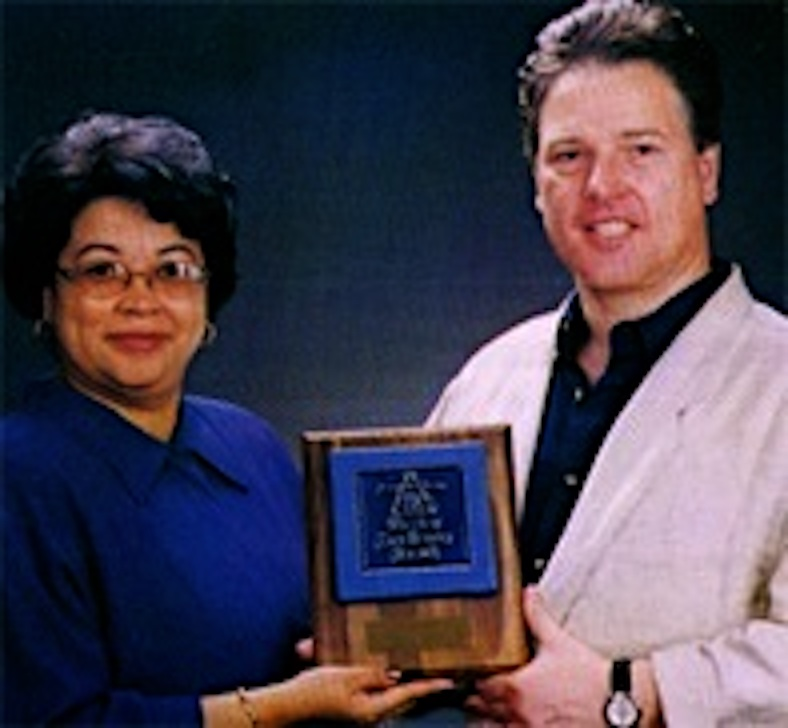
Karim Alrawi receives Free Press Theatre Excellence Award, 1998, wth Debra Wicks, Artistic Director of Meadow Brook Theatre, MI, USA

His play Sarajevo about the Bosnian war was given a workshop production at MBT and the Shenandoah Arts Theatre. The play Sugar Candy was given a staged reading at Mixed Blood Theatre in Minneapolis.

Patagonia a play about torture and resistance was first performed by Ruby Slippers Theatre in Vancouver, Canada. Across The Morne a play for two actors and dogs, set in Newfoundland, was given a staged reading at the Playwrights' Theatre Centre, Vancouver, Canada.

Deep Cut, a play set on the American Gulf Islands about cultural conflict and political and personal expediency, was staged at La MaMa ETC in New York as well as by Golden Thread Productions Theatre in San Francisco and later in Washington, DC.

Golden Thread Theatre also produced Alrawi's children's play The Girl Who Lost her Smile, touring the production for almost two years.

== Children's fiction ==
Alrawi has written two children's picture books: The Girl Who Lost Her Smile and The Mouse Who Saved Egypt.

The Girl Who Lost Her Smile was winner of Parents Magazine Gold Award 2002 and was a finalist for the Kentucky Bluegrass Book Award (Kentucky Students' Choice) 2002. It was staged and performed as a children's play in the UK by Tutti Frutti Theatre and York Theatre Royal, and in the United States by Golden Thread Theatre.

His picture book The Mouse Who Saved Egypt was listed for the People's Prize in the UK.

He also authored a children's literary cookbook: Arab Fairytale Feast that was shortlisted for the Forest of Reading Children's Books Awards, 2023.

== Adult fiction ==
Alrawi's novel Book of Sands, subtitled a novel of the Arab uprising, was published by HarperCollins in the Fall of 2015. The novel won the inaugural HarperCollins Publishers Prize for Best New Fiction. It was a Canadian Broadcasting Corporation Best Book of the year and shortlisted for the Amazon Best New Fiction award.

== Other publications and productions ==
Karim Alrawi has written plays for BBC radio and television, as well as for Channel 4 television in the UK. He has contributed to a number of publications in the USA, UK, Canada and Europe (in translation).
