= Dawn King =

English dramatist (born 1978)

- Born: Dawn Elizabeth King; 1978 (age 47–48); Stroud, England
- Education: Goldsmiths, University of London
- Years active: 2002–present
- Website: www.dawn-king.com

Dawn Elizabeth King (born 1978) is an English playwright and screenwriter. Her play Foxfinder won the inaugural Papatango New Writing Prize and an Offie among other accolades. Her plays since have included Brave New World and The Trials. King's short film The Karman Line (2014) was nominated for a British Academy Film Award.

== Early life ==
King was born in Stroud, Gloucestershire. King attended Cashes Green Primary School and then Archway School. She graduated from Goldsmiths, University of London.

== Career ==
King's play Foxfinder won the 2011 Papatango New Writing Prize and was produced at the Finborough Theatre, directed by Blanche McIntyre. For her work, King received the Offie for Most Promising Playwright and the 2013 Royal National Theatre Foundation (RNTF) Playwright award. Foxfinder was also shortlisted for the Susan Smith Blackburn Prize and the inaugural James Tait Black Memorial Prize. King was the Finborough Theatre's 2012 Pearson Writer-in-Residence. Foxfinder had its U.S. premiere in Pasadena with the Furious Theatre Company.

King reunited with Blanche McIntyre for her next play Ciphers, which premiered in 2013. The production was a collaboration between the Out of Joint theatre company, the Bush Theatre and Exeter's Northcott Theatre. Ciphers is a spy thriller inspired by the real-life story of Gareth Williams.

In 2014, King's short film The Karman Line starring Olivia Colman premiered at the South by Southwest (SXSW). King was named a 2014 Screen International Star of Tomorrow. The Karman Line was nominated for a British Academy Film Award in the British Short Film category.

King adapted Aldous Huxley's dystopian novel Brave New World for stage in a 2015 co-production between the Royal & Derngate in Northampton and the Touring Consortium theatre company. It was directed by James Dacre.

Foxfinder returned to the stage in 2018 with the Loft Theatre Company in Leamington before having a short West End run at the Ambassadors Theatre later in the year starring Iwan Rheon and directed by Rachel O'Riordan.

After a run in Germany, King's eco-play The Trials had its UK premiere at the Donmar Warehouse in 2022 starring Joe Locke and William Gao and directed by Natalie Abrahami. King mostly wrote the play during lockdown, inspired by the September 2019 climate strikes led by Greta Thunberg. The Trials was a finalist for the Susan Smith Blackburn Prize. Also staged in 2022 was Addictive Beat for the Boundless Theatre Company starring Fionn Whitehead and Boadicea Ricketts.

In 2024, King contributed to Cutting the Tightrope: The Divorce of Politics from Art, a 2024 collection of short plays written in response to censorship surrounding Palestine in the arts. The Trials was revived in 2025 at Southwark Playhouse.

== Select plays ==
- Foxfinder
- Ciphers
- Brave New World
- Salt
- The Trials
- Addictive Beat
