= Al Misri =

Egyptian newspaper (1936–1954)

- Owner: Mahmoud Abu Al Fath
- Founders: Karim Thabit; Muhammad Al Tabai; Mahmoud Abu Al Fath
- Managing editor: Hussein Abu Al Fath
- Founded: 1936
- Ceased publication: 4 May 1954
- Political alignment: Wafd Party; Arab nationalism
- Language: Arabic
- Headquarters: Cairo
- Country: Egypt

Al Misri (Arabic: المصرى, romanized: al-Miṣrī, lit. 'The Egyptian') was a nationalist newspaper which was published in Cairo, Egypt, from 1936 to 1954. The paper was one of the most widely read newspapers during its lifetime and was closed down by the Egyptian authorities on 4 May 1954.

== History and profile ==
Al Misri was established by Karim Thabit, Muhammad Al Tabai and Mahmoud Abu Al Fath in 1936. Elie Politi, a leading Jewish businessman, assisted the foundation of the paper. Soon after its start Mahmoud Abu Al Fath bought the paper for a few thousand dollars and made it an official media outlet of the Wafd Party. Mahmoud Abu Al Fath's younger siblings worked at the paper: Hussein Abu Al Fath was the managing editor, and Ahmad Abu Al Fath was the editor of Al Misri.

Following the acquisition of the paper by Mahmoud Abu Al Fath, Al Misri adopted a nationalist political stance. The paper sold 100,000 copies, making it both a financial success and an influential political force. It also became a competitor of Al Ahram. In July 1939 the editors' houses were searched on the orders of the public prosecutor due to the fierce opposition of the Wafd Party against the government. During the same period Al Misri was among the ardent critics of the Muslim Brotherhood which began to gain more members in the society.

Beginning with World War II, the Egyptian government restricted the page number of all papers, including Al Misri, to six pages due to the shortage of paper. Although the war ended and the paper supply improved, the page number of the newspapers was set at eight pages by the government. As of 1950 Al Misri had twelve-page. The affiliation of Al Misri with the Wafd Party weakened after World War II. However, it did not completely disappear, and the paper published numerous articles supporting the North African independence in line with the party policies in 1947.

Al Misri sold 150,000 copies in 1953. In May 1954 the Fath brothers were accused of being disloyal to the national interests following the publication of several articles in the paper demanding Gamal Abdel Nasser to follow the policies of the Wafd Party. The paper was banned on 4 May 1954. Soon after the closure of Al Misri, its publishing facilities were used for the publication of the state-run newspaper Al Gomhuria which was launched the same year.
