= James Faerron =

American set designer

- Occupations: Scenic designer, Producing Manager, Artistic Director, Theatrical producer

James Faerron is an American set designer.

== Career ==
His career began in Miami, Florida, where he worked for The Actor’s Playhouse and The Area Stage Theater Company as a set designer and technical director. His move to San Francisco in 1996 led to becoming the Technical Director and Production Manager for The Magic Theatre. While working there, James developed what became long collaborative relationships with Bay Area theater companies Campo Santo, Encore Theatre Company, and Z Space and proceeded to develop over 40 world premieres written by some of the best American playwrights. James is also an educator and is presently the Technical Theater Instructor and Technical Director for San Francisco University High School, a position he has held since 2004. He was also been the Chair of the Arts Department for San Francisco University High School from 2015 to 2024.

James is known as a minimalist designer. His designs focus on the word and forward movement of the script. For the past 20 years he has concentrated on developing new plays and designing sets for many World Premieres by playwrights such as Octavio Solis, Adam Bock, Erin Cressida Wilson, Denis Johnson, Naomi Iizuka, Greg Sarris, Mark Jackson, Yussef El Guindi, Loretta Grecco, José Rivera, Carl Djerassi, Dave Eggers, Philip Kan Gotanda, Kevin Fisher, Jessica Hagedorn, Teresa Walsh, Luis Saguar, Jorge Ignacio Cortiñas and Zayd Dohrn. He lives in San Francisco, California, where he was the Co-Artistic Director for Encore Theatre Company until 2016.

== Selected reviews ==
“Hidden Parts” San Francisco Examiner – “Steindler and her designers make excellent use of the Thick's tall, narrow performance space. Faerron's striking set uses two rows of tall, late-summer-tasseled cornstalks to suggest vast fields, with a two-tiered, nightmarishly skewed farmhouse growing out of the opposite wall. The crazy-angled upper porch, with its antique rocker, is the aerie from which crude, menacing, hawk-eyed family patriarch Thomas Arn (John Robb) surveys his domain. The patio below - with its half-heartedly festive party decorations - is the realm of his nervous, absent-minded wife Cynthia (Nancy Madden).”

“Back of The Throat” San Francisco Chronicle – “James Faerron's grungy, low-rent, basement apartment set is a character- defining extension of the semi-bohemian, intellectually curious, impoverished would-be writer Khaled”

“Monkey Room” Talking Broadway – “James Faerron has devised a breathtaking meticulous lab room that is perfect in every detail.”

“Shaker Chair” Talking Broadway – “James Faerron has devised a strikingly pristine set with a plain beige wall with an entrance doorway and two significant chairs: a stern Shaker chair and a more comfortable chair.” San Francisco Chronicle - “Dolly wallows self-indulgently in her personal soap opera and a broad, decadently comfortable armchair - the only such luxury in James Faerron's strikingly pristine set, its spartan white walls and clean lines echoing the architecture of the former church that's become Shotgun's Ashby Stage.”

“Beirut / Kvetch” Miami News – “Scenic designer James Faerron turns the stage into a cavernous hovel by using a pastiche of hurricane shutters, graffiti, and wood. This intricate set finds itself transformed on alternating nights when an entirely different show, the two-act Kvetch, takes the stage. The new set, a black-and-white op-art representation of the inside of a neurotic brain (designed, again, by Faerron) proves to be the most imaginative aspect of this overwrought comedy...”

“Hellhound On My Trail” Berkeley Daily Planet – “James Faerron’s set is quite striking. Windows downstage left and right plunge upstage center with a highly exaggerated angle of perspective. In the first act, with the addition of well-used wooden furniture, it is a schoolish bureaucratic interrogation room. In the second act, a hotel coffee shop. In the third act, a no-frills Texas motel.”

“Psychos Never Dream” San Francisco Weekly – “James Faerron has built an ideal split-level set, with crisp town scenes on top and disordered farm scenes below...” San Francisco Chronicle – “...as James Faerron's inventively versatile set – beautifully used by Larson throughout – unfolds to reveal a stunningly shoddy ranch interior...”

“Five Flights” Curtain Up – “James Faerron's abstract set manages to accommodate it all, including some modest projections to announce the "scenes" and a locker room encounter that creates a mini-hockey match with an empty shampoo bottle retrieved from an off-stage shower.” San Francisco Chronicle – “Everything rises on an updraft with the script. James Faerron's set, exquisitely lit by David Szlasa, uses a few white benches and a French curve to say everything that's required.”

“Pancho and Lucy” San Francisco Chronicle – “James Faerron's set, creatively lit by Jim Cave, is a perfect low-rent bar, from its odd art and half-working beer signs to its Elvis-bedecked corner bandstand….” SF Guardian – “... sharply choreographed by codirector Erika Schuch on James Faerron's lovingly detailed, atmospheric set.”

“The Typographer’s Dream” San Francisco Chronicle – “The stage is stripped to its bare walls for Faerron's creatively spare set, the floor covered with a network of schematic architectural outlines that will set up a clever homage-lampoon riff on Lars von Trier's "Dogville."”

“Soul of a Whore” San Francisco Chronicle – “Masha's, John's and HT's lives continue to intertwine with Jenks' as the action moves from bus station to intensive care unit to death row, each location beautifully suggested by shifts of the concrete-like, structural frames of James Faerron's set and changes in Jim Cave's architectural lights and Drew Yerys' ambient sound effects.”

“June in a Box” San Francisco Chronicle – “Composer Beth Custer and accordionist Isabel Douglass strike up an engaging corrido, framed in an odd trapezoid window in the patchwork junkyard wall of James Faerron's striking set.”

“Stairway to Heaven” Oakland Tribune – “....she cooks elaborate meals in a dingy apartment (the wonderfully stained, crumbling set is by James Faerron) and dictates her eloquent, poetic memories to Mickey, a possible junkie, who scribbles it all into a notebook.”
