= Ihsan Abdel Quddous =

Egyptian writer and novelist (1919–1995)

OM ORE Ihsan Abdel Quddous
- إحسان عبد القدوس
- Born: 1 January 1919; Cairo, Sultanate of Egypt
- Died: 11 January 1990 (aged 71); Cairo, Egypt
- Occupations: Novelist, writer and journalist
- Children: 1
- Parents: Mohamed Abdel Quddous (father); Rose al Yusuf (mother)

Ihsan Abdel Quddous (Egyptian Arabic: إحسان عبد القدوس ʼIḥsān ʻAbd el-ʼuddūs, IPA: [ʔeħˈsæːn ʕæbdel.ʔʊdˈduːs]) (1 January 1919 – 11 January 1990) was an Egyptian writer, novelist, journalist and editor for Egypt's Al Akhbar and Al-Ahram newspapers. He wrote many novels that were adapted into films, and served as editor for many years of the literary journal Rose al-Yūsuf.

== Early life and education ==
Abdel Quddous was born in Cairo, to an Egyptian father from Gharbia Governorate, Mohamed Abd El-Quddous, and Lebanese journalist Rose al Yusuf.

His favorite hobby as a child was reading. At the age of eleven, he started writing short stories and classical poems. His father, Mohamed Abdel Quddous, an Egyptian theater and film actor, motivated him to pursue a career in law. Ihsan graduated from law school in 1942 and worked as a lawyer. He was, at the beginning of his career, a trainee for the law firm of Edward Qussairi, a famous Egyptian lawyer.

He was also an editor at Rose al Youssef, a weekly magazine that his mother Fatima al Youssef (aka Rose al Yusuf) had founded.

== Literary and journalism career ==
In 1944, he started writing film scripts, short stories, and novels. He later left his law career to focus on his literary career. A few years later, he became a distinguished journalist in the Al Akhbar newspaper, where he worked for eight years. He then worked in the Al-Ahram newspaper and became its editor-in-chief. He often criticized important personalities, which got him imprisoned three times throughout his journalism career.

Ihsan regarded women as symbols of sacrifice in the Egyptian society which was why women were the central theme of his literary works. His works influentially contributed to bring change in the conventional concepts in Egypt. Contrary to his literary works, he was a very conservative person. He was known to have a resisting personality and had been a strict husband and father in his house. He wrote more than 60 novels and collections of short stories. Of his novels, five were dramatized, nine were used as radio series scripts, ten had television miniseries adaptations, and 49 had film adaptations, such as Sleepless (1957), I Am Free (1959), There is a Man in our House (1961), My Wife's Dignity (1967), Empire M (1972), Where Is My Mind? (1974)and I'm Not Lying But I'm Beautifying (1981). His works have been translated to several foreign languages including the English, French, German, Ukrainian, and Chinese languages. Ihsan also co-founded the Egyptian Story Club.

He drew inspiration for his epistolary Arabic novel, La anam (translated into English as I Do Not Sleep) from editing letters sent by advice-seeking readers to the journal Ruz al-Yusuf.

== Personal life and death ==
His son Mohamed Ihsan Abdel Quddous is a journalist.

One of Ihsan's first articles was an attack on the British Ambassador Miles Lampson (Lord Killearn). He won early fame by writing articles exposing the government's role in providing the troops with defective arms during the Palestine War for which he was imprisoned. Ihsan was jailed again in 1954 after writing an article, titled the secret society that rules Egypt "al-jam'iyya al-sir-riyya al-lati tahkum Misr," that revealed Nasser's machinations in the March Crisis.

Ihsan Abdel Quddous died on 12 January 1990 after suffering a stroke.

== Awards and honors ==
Ihsan Abdel Quddous received his first award for writing the novel My Blood, My Tears, My Smile in 1973. Two years later, in 1975, he received a Best Screenplay award for his novel The Bullet Is Still in my Pocket. He was honored by the former Egyptian president Gamal Abdel Nasser with an Order of Merit of the First Class. Shortly after his death in 1990, the incumbent Egyptian president Hosni Mubarak honored him with an Order of the Republic of the First Class.

== See also ==
- Yussef El Guindi
