= Golden Thread Productions =

American theatre company

- Formation: 1996
- Type: Theatre group
- Purpose: Middle Eastern theatre
- Location(s): 1695 18th Street, San Francisco, California, U.S.
- Artistic director(s): Torange Yeghiazarian, Sahar Assaf
- Website: goldenthread.org

Golden Thread Productions, is an American theatre company founded in 1996 in San Francisco, California, that promotes theatre as a forum for cultural exchange, exploring Middle Eastern culture and identity as represented throughout the globe.

== About ==
Golden Thread is led by the founding Artistic Director, Torange Yeghiazarian; Executive Artistic Director, Sahar Assaf; and Managing Director, Michelle Mulholland. Founding members of Golden Thread included Maria Zamroud, Termeh Yeghiazarian, Gen Hayashida, and Kamshad Kooshan. The organization is overseen by a board of trustees led by president Kia Mousavi, and an advisory board led by chairs, Marvin Carlson from the Graduate Center of the City University of New York, and Hamid Dabashi from Columbia University. Artistic associates include Vida Ghahremani, Yussef El Guindi, and Roberta Levitow.

The mission is to make theatre a regular part of the Middle Eastern community’s cultural life, and to make the Middle East a regular part of the American theatre experience. The group motto has been, "Placing the Middle East Center Stage". Golden Thread Productions defines the Middle East broadly and inclusively, believing that the common human experience transcends cultural and political differences. Among the nations represented in past productions are Iran, Armenia, Egypt, Israel, Palestine, Algeria, Japan, Syria, Turkey, Iraq, and Afghanistan.

The annual programming consists of a mainstage season of two to three full-length productions, the ReOrient Festival of short plays, an annual Women’s Day event, touring and education program for youth, and a variety of workshops, staged readings, and special events offered throughout the year. Golden Thread Productions’ debut production was Operation No Penetration, Lysistrata 97! The classic Greek antiwar comedy was adapted to a Middle Eastern setting where Palestinian and Israeli women unite to force men into signing a peace treaty.

Golden Thread Productions was awarded the American Theatre Wing's National Theatre Company Grant in 2013 and 2016.

== ReOrient Festival ==
Golden Thread Productions' hallmark event is ReOrient, an annual festival of plays exploring Middle Eastern culture. Debuted in 1999, more than thirty plays have been presented at the ReOrient Festival, the majority of them world and/or United States premieres. For four weeks, the festival provides an opportunity for artists and audiences alike to engage with the Middle East in a creative and supportive setting that displaces misinformation and encourages understanding. The ReOrient Festival has provided a home to some well-known emerging Middle Eastern voices on American stage (and screen) today including: Betty Shamieh, Caveh Zahedi, as well as such established playwrights as Naomi Wallace, Eric Ehn, Israel Horovitz, and Motti Lerner.

The critical response to the ReOrient Festival has, over the years, been general acclaim: Robert Hurwitt with the San Francisco Chronicle calls it, “haunting and provocative…with reverberations far beyond its immediate cultural context,” and Robert Avila with the San Francisco Bay Guardian states, “Golden Thread triumphs with the ReOrient Festival.”

== Fairytale Players ==
Over the past three years, Golden Thread has developed programming for youth in the community. In 2006, the company launched The Fairytale Players as part of their Children’s Traditional Theatre Program, created by an ensemble of actors who work together in a workshop setting to create and tour fairy tales from around the Middle East. This project is rooted in their past efforts on The Norooz Story and An Iranian Fairytale, both based on ancient tales and utilizing traditional performance elements, music, and dance from the region. These short fairytale performances were presented at the Asian Art Museum, the San Francisco TheatreFest, and Asian Pacific Islander Festival, as well as Park Day School and the Ferry Building. Golden Thread has also recently developed an after-school program in partnership with Krouzian-Zekarian-Vasbouragan Armenian School in San Francisco, and plans to expand their roster of venues in 2009 to include schools, libraries, museums and community centers.

== See also ==
- Persian theatre
- Theatre Communications Group
- Silk Road Chicago
- Yussef El Guindi
