= Al-Akhbar (Egypt) =

Egyptian daily newspaper

Al-Akhbar الأخبار
- Type: Daily newspaper
- Founder(s): Ali Amin; Mustafa Amin
- Publisher: Dar Akhbar El Yom
- Founded: 1 May 1952; 73 years ago
- Language: Arabic
- Headquarters: Cairo
- Website: Al-Akhbar

Al-Akhbar (Egyptian Arabic: الأخبار; The News in English) is an Egyptian daily morning newspaper. It is a state-owned semi-official newspaper. Founded in 1952, Al-Akhbar is released in Arabic through the Dar Akhbar Al-Youm.

== History and profile ==
Al-Akhbar was first published in May 1952 as a part of Akhbar el-Yom. The founders were the Amin brothers, Ali and Mustafa Amin. The publisher is Dar Akhbar El Yom. The paper is headquartered in Cairo.

Egyptian novelist Gamal el-Ghitani is one of the former contributors and editors-in-chief of the daily. He was appointed to the post in 1985. Another prominent Egyptian author Anis Mansour was also the editor-in-chief of the daily. In January 2011 Mohamed Barakat was appointed editor-in-chief, replacing Mohamed Mahdy Fadly in the post. Mohammad Hassan El Bana assumed the post during the Morsi era. Ibrahim Abdul Meguid worked for the daily and was dismissed during the same period due to his critical articles about the Muslim Brotherhood. The paper also ceased its "free opinion" section and fired several contributors during the same period.

In terms of institutional size, it is the second daily in the country after al-Ahram. During the 1950s al-Akhbar had a circulation of over 700,000 copies. In 1976, the paper was the most read daily in Egypt with a circulation of 650,000 copies. In 2000 the paper sold 1.1 million copies.
