= Akher Saa =

Weekly consumer magazine in Egypt

- Categories: Consumer magazine
- Frequency: Weekly
- Founder: Mohamed El Tabii
- Founded: 1924; 102 years ago
- Country: Egypt
- Based in: Cairo
- Language: Arabic

Akher Saa (Arabic: آخر ساعة; the Last Hour) is an Arabic-language weekly consumer magazine published in Egypt. The magazine is also described as a photo magazine. Launched in 1924, it is among the oldest publications in the country.

== History and profile ==
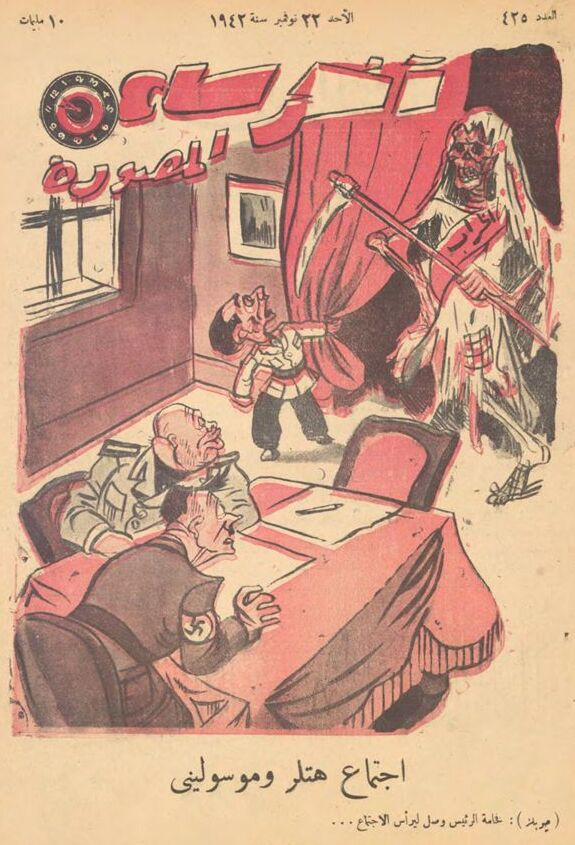
1942 cartoon depicting the Grim Reaper showing up to a meeting between Adolf Hitler and Benito Mussolini

Akher Saa was established by Mohamed El-Tabii in 1924. During its initial period the magazine was one of the publications supporting the Wafd Party. It was relaunched by Mustafa Amin and Ali Amin in 1944. Then, it became part of Akhbar el-Yom which is also the publisher of the magazine. Akher Saa has been owned by the Egyptian government since 1960.

Based in Cairo, Akher Saa covers social events, women's interests and sports. The magazine, published on Saturdays, also includes political, economic and social news. The memoirs of Gamal Abdel Nasser were published in the magazine in Spring 1955.

Mohamed Hassanein Heikal was the editor-in-chief of Akher Saa in the 1950s. From 1970 to 1976 Egyptian author Anis Mansour was the editor-in-chief. Ahmed Roshdy Saleh also served as the editor-in-chief of the magazine. As of 2008 Samir Ragab was the editor in chief and chairman of the magazine. On 28 June 2014 Mohamed Abdel Hafez became the editor-in-chief. In September 2020 Mohamed El Sebaei Mohamed was appointed to the post.

From 2006 to 2008, Mohamed Abdelbaki served as foreign affairs editor for the magazine.

Armenian-Egyptian cartoonist Alexander Saroukhan worked for the magazine since its inception from 1934 to 1946. Rakha, an Egyptian cartoonist, also contributed to the magazine. Graphic arts by Al Hussein Fawzi were also published in the magazine.

The circulation of the weekly in 2000 was 120,000 copies.

== See also ==
- List of magazines in Egypt
