= Motti Lerner =

Israeli playwright and screenwriter (born 1949)

Motti Lerner (Hebrew: מוטי לרנר; born September 16, 1949) is an Israeli playwright and screenwriter.

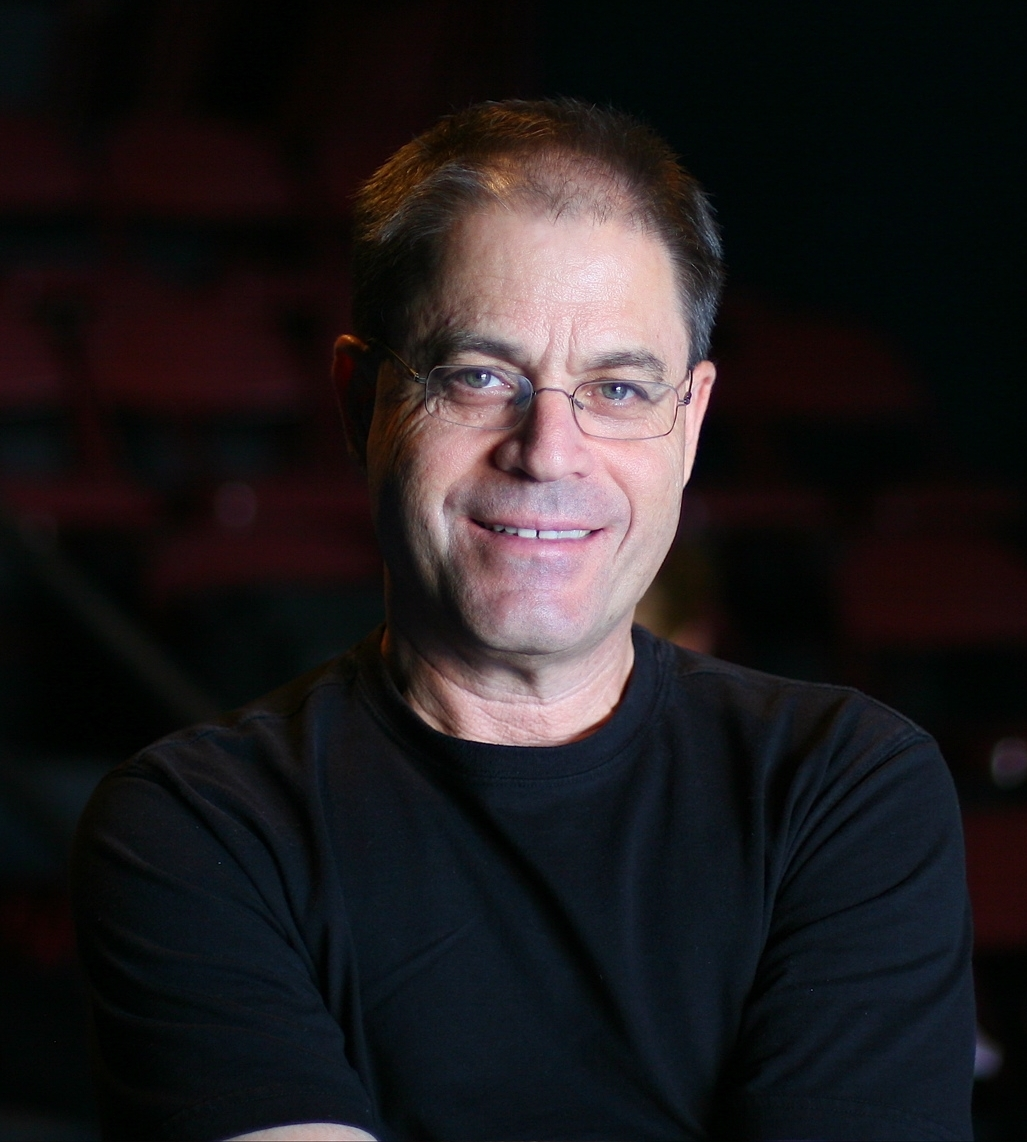
Motti Lerner

== Early life ==
He was born in Zikhron Ya'akov, a village south of Haifa, in Israel. His great-grandparents immigrated to Palestine in 1882 from Romania and Russia, and became farmers.

=== Education ===
He was educated at the local and regional schools. In 1967-1970 he studied mathematics and physics at The Hebrew University of Jerusalem. In 1975 he began studying theatre at the Hebrew University, and continued in theatre workshops in England and the San Francisco Dancers' Workshop in San Francisco (1976)

== Life and career ==
In 1977-78 he founded and directed the Maduga Experimental Theater, as part of The Jerusalem Theater, where he produced experimental and street performances. From 1978 to 1984 he was a dramaturge and director at the Jerusalem Khan Theatre, where he directed his own play The princess and the Hobo, Gotcha by Barrie Keeffe, and Magic Afternoon by Wolfgang Bauer. He began writing plays and film scripts in 1984 and moved to Tel Aviv. Since 1986 he has taught playwriting at the Drama School of the Kibbutzim College of Education in Tel Aviv. From 1992 to 2007 he taught political playwriting at Tel Aviv University. In 1992 he wrote his first television play, Loves at Betania which was produced by Israel's Channel 1. In 1993 he was a visiting professor at The Oxford Centre for Postgraduate Hebrew and Studies, in 1997 was a visiting professor at Duke University Theater Program in North Carolina, and in 2006 and 2007 was a visiting professor at Knox College, Illinois. Motti Lerner is one of the pioneers of radical political theatre in Israel, and one of the country’s leading writers of documentary drama and television docudramas. In the 1980s and 90s, his plays Kastner, Pangs of the Messiah, and Pollard, and the documentary drama serials The Kastner Trial and Bus No. 300, placed him at the center of the Israeli theatre and television milieu, and aroused public debate on subjects at the heart of Israel’s political and ideological life: the Holocaust, the occupation of Palestinian territories, Israeli society’s moral ethos, and Israel-Jewish Diaspora relations. In 1997, The Municipal Theatre of Heilbronn, Germany, staged The Murder of Isaac, a play about the assassination of Israeli Prime Minister Yitzhak Rabin. To date the play has not been produced in Israel, following claims that it is anti-Semitic. During a Knesset plenum debate, several Knesset members demanded that the government request from the German government that it close down the play. The Israeli government rejected this demand. Following The Murder of Isaac Lerner’s writing became more radical. Israeli theatres rejected many of his new plays, and staged only those not dealing with controversial political issues, such as Hard Love, (Haifa Municipal Theatre, 2003), and Passing the Love of Women, (Habima National Theatre, 2004). His more controversial plays have been staged successfully in Europe and the US, including Coming Home, Pangs of the Messiah, The Murder of Isaac, and Benedictus. Since 2016 he has been writing mainly for Habima National Theatre in Tel Aviv, and his plays are produced there frequently.

From Prof. Gad Kaynar's preface to Seven Plays by Motti Lerner (published by Tel Aviv University, 2009): “The illusion that we can save the world by writing is a vital component in the drive to write”. This title, borrowed from Motti Lerner’s essay ‘Playwriting in Wartime’ expresses the tendentious poetics characterizing Lerner’s dramatic writing, which is presented in the seven plays of this anthology. In the postmodern world of shattering of forms and the sanctification of chaos, of ideological anti-structuralism, of ‘Things fall apart; the center cannot hold’, Motti Lerner, in his writing for stage, screen, and television, is one of the last Mohicans who believe that the world can be rationalized and saved through art, that we must still execute the role of the theatre allotted to it by Hamlet in his monologue to the players: ‘to hold, as ‘twere, the mirror up to nature; to show virtue her own feature, scorn her own image, and the very age and body of the time his form and pressure’. Manifested in each of the plays in this anthology is the firm belief in the ability of theatre to influence reality, to change it by changing the audience’s consciousness. Lerner's theatre is a continuation of the social and political struggle by different means. Therefore, Lerner’s ideational philosophy, as worded in essays, articles, interviews, and lectures, is strongly linked to its theatrical application. This link is accurately reflected in a paragraph from a lecture given by Lerner – the most prominent neo-Aristotelian writer in Israeli drama – at the 2005 Jerusalem Conference: ‘Catharsis is the most profound and effective dramatic tool. There cannot be a good dramatic play that does not contain catharsis. Therefore the Israeli playwright also has to employ it, otherwise his play will be ineffective. The fact that catharsis is a tool borrowed from Greek theatre cannot disqualify its use. The question is not whether or not to use catharsis: the question is how to use it, which values to endow through it. If it is possible through catharsis to endow values of love of man, the centrality of man in our universe, his freedom of choice, his responsibility for his choice, and his sovereignty over his life – then it must be used.’

== Work ==
=== Plays ===
- Kastner (1985), A political/historical drama about the negotiations conducted by the Jewish community in Hungary during World War II – and specifically by Rudolf Kastner with Adolf Eichmann of the SS – with a view to rescuing the remnants of European Jewry. Originally produced by the Cameri Theater of Tel Aviv. Also produced by the Heilbronn Theatre, Germany (1988). See Kastner train and Kastner trial.
- Paula (1987), A monodrama about Paula Ben-Gurion, the wife of the first prime minister of Israel, in which she questions many of the issues her husband dealt with. Produced by the Cameri Theater of Tel Aviv.
- Pangs of the Messiah (1988) A political drama about the right-wing settlers in the West Bank who oppose the peace treaty between Israel and the Palestinians, and blow up the holy mosques in Jerusalem to sabotage it. Originally produced by the Cameri Theatre of Tel Aviv. A new version of this play was produced at Theater J in Washington, D.C. (2007) and won a nomination for the Helen Hayes Best Play Award (2008). It was also produced in Chicago and Cleveland (2009), in Atlanta (2011) and in New York (2011).
- Exile in Jerusalem (1989) Originally titled Else. A drama based on the last five years of the life of the great German-Jewish poet Else Lasker-Schüler, who fled Nazi Germany in 1933 and found refuge in Jerusalem where, in spite of her greatness, she died isolated and forgotten. Originally produced by the Habima National Theatre, Tel Aviv. Also produced by The Jewish Ensemble Theatre in Detroit (1993), Tri-Bühne Theatre in Stuttgart (1994), Williamstown Theatre Festival, Massachusetts – with Julie Harris in the title role (1994), the Wienkelwiese Theatre in Zürich (1995), Theatre J in Washington, D.C. (1998), La-Mama Theatre in New York (1998), Freie Bühne theatre in Vienna, Salt Pillar Theatre in Melbourne (2000), Bimah Theatre in Berlin (2002)
- Pollard (1994) A political drama about the scandal created by the Israeli intelligence services that hired an American Jew employed by the US Navy to spy for Israel. Originally produced by the Cameri Theatre of Tel Aviv.
- Autumn (1996) A drama about a doctor who immigrated from Poland to Palestine in 1896 to become a farmer. After 30 frustrating years on the farm, he falls in love with his former lover’s daughter, but is caught by his wife and children who kill him to stop the affair. Originally produced by Beit Lessin Theater, Tel Aviv. Also produced by the Heilbronn Theatre, Germany (1996)
- The Murder of Isaac (1999), A drama about the assassination of Yitzhak (Isaac) Rabin, Israel’s prime minister, following his peace negotiations with the Palestinians. The play explores the infrastructure of Israeli society in an attempt to present the internal ideological and religious conflicts that led to this tragic event. Originally produced by the Municipal Theatre of Heilbronn, Germany. Also produced by Center Stage Theatre in Baltimore, US, in 2006.
- Coming Home (2003) A one-act play about a young soldier who returns from his army service in the occupied territories suffering severe Posttraumatic stress disorder. Originally produced by Tzavta Festival for One-act Plays (2003). Also produced as part of the play GEGENSETIEN written by a group of 8 Israeli and Palestinian writers in Heilbronn, Germany (2003), and by the Golden Thread Productions in San Francisco (2003, 2009).
- Hard Love (2003), A drama about a secular writer and his ultra-Orthodox ex-wife who are trying to remarry after twenty years of divorce, but discover that they have changed so much that living together has become impossible. Originally produced by the Haifa Municipal Theatre (2003). Also produced by Theatre Or in Durham, North Carolina in 2005, by Bimah Theatre in Berlin (2006), by The Jewish Theatre of the South in Atlanta (2008), and by Old Mutual Theatre in Johannesburg, South Africa (2008)
- Passing the Love of Women (2003) A drama inspired by "Two", a short story by Isaac Bashevis Singer (written in collaboration with Israel Zamir) about two yeshiva students in 19th century Poland who discover that they are homosexual, and one of them has to disguise himself as a woman so he can live together with his lover. Originally Produced by Habima National Theatre, Tel Aviv. Also produced at Theatre J in Washington, D.C. (2004).
- Benedictus (2007), A political thriller that takes place 72 hours before an American attack on the nuclear facilities in Iran. An Iranian-born Israeli arms dealer tries to rescue his sister from Teheran and offers arms to an Iranian politician, who struggles to postpone the American attack. Originally produced by the Golden Thread Productions in San Francisco. Also produced at the LATC in Los Angeles (2007) and Theatre J in Washington, D.C. (2009)
- The Hastening of The End (2013) A political drama about the Massacre committed by Baruch Goldstein in the Cave of the Patriarchs in Hebron in 1994. Produced by the Khan Theatre in Jerusalem.
- Paulus (2013) An epic drama about Paul of Tarsus and his decision to separate Christianity from Judaism in order to create a new monotheistic civilization based on universalism. Produced by Silk Road Rising Theater in Chicago.
- The Admission (2014) A political drama about the contradicting narratives of the 1948 war that led to the establishment of the state of Israel and to the exile of the Palestinian refugees. Produced by Theater J in Washington DC, and by Jaffa Theater in Jaffa (2016)
- After the War (2015) A political drama an Israeli pianist who struggles to create a change in the political discourse in Israel after the 2006 war between Israel and Lebanon. Produced by Mosaic Theater in Washington DC.
- Doing His Will (2017) A drama about a Hasidic woman, who wasn't able to accept the prohibitions on sexual relation in her community, left the religion, but was cut off from her children and ended up killing herself. Produced by Habima National Theater in Tel Aviv.
- The Abandoned Melody (2019) A Drama with songs about the last 10 years of Nathan Alterman, the great Israeli poet who faced strong criticism on his aesthetic and political choices and stopped writing poetry. Produced by Habima National Theatre in Tel Aviv.
- On The Edge (2022) A drama about the relationship of an old publisher who tried to publish an anthology of short stories by Israeli soldiers who fought in Gaza in 2014, and his son who runs the publishing house after he was released from the army in 2014 because he was injured in a military operation in Gaza. Produced by Jaffa Theatre in Jaffa.
- Golda (2023) A drama about Golda Meir, the late prime minister of Israel, and the failure of her government to open peace negotiation with Egypt before the 1973 Yom Kippur War. Produced by Habima National Theatre in Tel Aviv.
- Eichmann's Trial A play about the trial of Nazi war criminal Adolph Eichmann that took place in 1961 in Jerusalem. The play in an attempt to expose the context for the eruption of human evil. Produced by the National Theatre in Bucarest (2024).
- Eichmann's Trial - the opera - the libretto was adapted from the play by the same name. Music composed by Gil Shohat. Produced by the National Opera in Bucarest (2025).

=== Television and film scripts ===
- Loves in Betania (1992) A 60-minute television drama about the dramatic changes that took place in the social and moral structure of the kibbutz in the 1990s.
- The Kastner Trial (1994) A three-part television drama, based on the Kastner Affair, in which the leader of Hungarian Jewry during World War II was accused of collaboration with the Nazis in the extermination of Hungarian Jewry, and who was later assassinated by a right-wing militant Jew in Tel Aviv in 1957.
- Bus Number 300 (1997) A five-part television drama about one of the most traumatic scandals in the Israeli secret services: Four Palestinian terrorists hijacked a bus and were stopped by the Israeli army. Two of them were taken alive after the army assaulted the bus, interrogated by the secret service, and killed immediately afterwards. The government issued a statement that all four terrorists were killed in the attack, but press photographers had taken pictures of the two terrorists taken alive. The drama explores the struggles between the government, the attorney general, and the secret services that were trying to bring the scandal to an end, each according to their own interests.
- Egoz (1998) A three-part television drama about the flight of Moroccan Jews to Israel in the 1950s and early '60s. The drama focuses on the organizing of a group of 44 Jews by the Mossad, their journey from Casablanca to the Mediterranean, their embarking on the Egoz, which sank in a storm.
- The Institute (2000) A 12-part television drama series that takes place in a psychotherapy institute and deals with the life of the therapists, their different patients, and the relationships between the therapists and their patients.
- A Battle in Jerusalem (2002) A three-part television drama that takes place during the 1948 Arab–Israeli War. A group of 20 soldiers is sent to take an Arab position near Jerusalem. After twenty hours of terrible fighting they decide to retreat, but as they are unable to carry their wounded, they blow up the position with the wounded in it.
- The Silence of the Sirens (2003) A TV feature film that takes place in the headquarters of Israeli Army Intelligence during the 10 days prior to the Yom Kippur War in 1973. The film explores the reasons why the head of military intelligence couldn't foresee the coming war, despite the accurate information in his possession.
- Altalena (2008) A feature film about the arms vessel sent by the French government to the Irgun right wing underground in Israel in 1948, and was destroyed by the Israeli government, an event that shaped Israel's internal politics for decades.
- Spring 1941 (2008) A feature film inspired by short stories by Ida Fink about a Jewish family in Poland in 1941 trying to survive the Nazi occupation. A Polish-Israeli co-production with Joseph Fiennes and Claire Higgins in the leading roles.
- Kapo in Jerusalem (2016) A feature film about a Jewish Physician who was appointed by the S.S to be a Kapo in Auschwitz, survived the war, and tried to begin new life in Jerusalem in 1946-48.

=== Bibliography in English ===
- Kastner – in Israeli Holocaust Drama, Michael Taub (ed.), Syracuse University Press (1996)
- Exile in Jerusalem – in 9 Contemporary Plays, Ellen Schiff and Michael Posnick (eds.), University of Texas Press (2005)
- Exile in Jerusalem - in An Anthology of Israeli Drama for the New Millennium, Michael Taub (ed.), The Edwin Mellen Press (2005)
- The Murder of Isaac – in Modern Jewish Plays, Jason Sherman (ed.), Playwright Canada Press, (2006)
- According to Chekhov - Thoughts on the writing of Uncle Vanya, NoPassport Press (2014)
- The Playwright's Purpose, No Passport Press (2015)

== Awards ==
- 1985 - Best Play Award for Kastner
- 1994 - Best TV Drama Award for The Kastner Trial
- 1995 - Prime Minister of Israel Award for Writers
- 2002 - Best One-act Play for Coming Home
- 2003 - Best TV Feature Film for The Silence of the Sirens
- 2015 - Landau Film Prize
