= Back of the Throat =

Back of the Throat is a play written by Arab-American playwright Yussef El Guindi. The play reflects the fear of the Arab-American community in the post-9/11 America.

It was first performed by San Francisco's Thick Description and Golden Thread Productions in April 2005.

It was performed in 2005 in Seattle, in 2006 at The Flea Theater in New York City under direction of Jim Simpson, and has also been produced in other locations, including Chicago, Pasadena, California (Los Angeles area), and London.

The play won the 2004 Northwest Playwrights' Competition held by Theater Schmeater, L.A. Weekly's Excellence in Playwriting Award for 2006, was nominated for the 2006 American Theater Critics Association's Steinberg/New Play Award, and was voted Best New Play of 2005 by the Seattle Times.

== Plot ==
The play is an approximately 75 minute one-act production, about a young Arab-American (Khaled) confined to his home by two government agents. The questioning of Khaled intensifies as the play progresses, with seemingly every item in his apartment a potential source of suspicion. It is revealed that his girlfriend first reported him for seeming suspicious in light of recent "attacks" which have occurred.

The play's title is a reference to the pronunciation of the Arabic “K” in Khaled’s name.
