= Mahmud Abu al-Fath =

Egyptian journalist and politician (1885–1958)

Mahmud Abu Al-Fath (Arabic: محمود أبو الفتح; 1885 – 15 August 1958 in Geneva) was an Egyptian journalist, founder and owner of the Wafdist newspaper Al Misri.

== Biography ==
Abu Al-Fath was born in 1885, and his father, Sheikh Ahmed Abu Al-Fath, was a professor of the Islamic law. He studied Law at the King Fuad I University in 1906, before working as a journalist at Al-Ahram.

He was a member of the Wafd Party in 1936 and founded Al Misri in the same year, then served in the Egyptian Senate during the World War II.

In 1954, Abu Al-Fath was sentenced to 15 years imprisonment in absentia for his criticisms of Nasser. He claimed asylum in Syria, later travelling to Iraq and taking Iraqi citizenship.
