= Rose al Yusuf (journalist) =

Lebanese born Egyptian actress

- فاطمة اليوسف / روز اليوسف
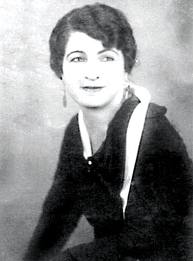
- Born: Fatima al Yusuf; 1898; Tripoli, Lebanon
- Died: 10 April 1958 (aged 59–60); Cairo, Egypt
- Citizenship: Egyptian
- Occupations: Journalist, actress
- Known for: Pioneer Arab woman journalist
- Spouses: Mohamed Abdel Quddus (Egyptian actor); Zaki Tulaymat (Egyptian actor)
- Children: Ihsan Abdel Quddous

Fatma Al-Yusef (Arabic: فاطمة اليوسف), also known as Roz Al-Yosef (Arabic: روز اليوسف) (1898 –10 April 1958), was a Lebanese-born Egyptian journalist and stage actress, a pioneer of Arab female journalism and a patron of the Arab female press. She is considered the Arab world's first woman journalist.

== Biography ==
Fatma Al Youssef was born in Tripoli, Lebanon, to a Turkish Muslim family. She received her primary education in Tripoli. Her mother died at birth, and she arrived in Egypt with her father when she was 10 years old. Her father then went on to live in Brazil and left her with the Christian family of Lebanese born Egyptian Eskander Farah, who had a major impact on her life, and especially on her choice to choose the acting profession. She began appearing at age 14. Initially, only in small roles, but her breakout came when none of the actresses agreed to play an old woman role, and Al-Yusuf took it upon herself.

From 1912 to 1925, she was a well-known theatre and work actress as part of the George Abyad troupe and the Yussef Wahbi troupe (1898–1982) reaching the peak of fame between 1923 and 1925. Her success won her the nickname the "Sarah Bernard of the East" and praise from Egyptian and international critics. She also became a favourite of the high society.

In 1925 she founded the news magazine Rose al-Yūsuf. The magazine, which did not hesitate to use in illustration of caricatures, became popular and addressed taboo subjects such as religion and sexuality, frequently narrating the 'flapper-age' of Egyptian society. This Cairo weekly, which continued despite the death of its founder in 1958, stood out in 1994 as one of the rare Arab journals to dare to publish extracts from the Satanic Verses of Salman Rushdie.

== Legacy ==
Through her work she succeeded in breaking social and political conventions and boundaries, and shattering prejudices imposed on women during her time, depriving them of their right to self-expression and their integration into the political and social arena.

Rose El Youssef, unique in her time, has become an emblematic figure of the Egyptian press and theatre and of the Cairo context in the interwar period. A documentary entitled The Legend of Rose al-Youssef, was produced in 2002 by Mohamad Kamel al-Kalioubi .

The Arab Human Development Report 2005: Towards the Rise of Women in the Arab World described her as a "pioneer of the stage and one of the earliest actresses." and said that she "was a woman unique in her time." She had said "I made this woman myself."

== Personal life ==
Her son Ihsan Abdel Quddous became one of Egypt's greatest writers. Her grandson is the Egyptian-American playwright Yussef El Guindi.

== See also ==
- May Ziadeh
- Hind Nawfal
- Alexandra Avierino
- Zaynab Fawwaz
