= Arabica Magazine =

Defunct Arab-American monthly lifestyle magazine

ARABICA Magazine
- ARABICA Magazine, January 2000
- Editor in Chief: Karim Alrawi
- Deputy editor: Chris Rizk
- Categories: Lifestyle
- Frequency: Monthly
- Circulation: 100,000
- Publisher: ARABICA Magazine Inc.
- First issue: May 1999; 26 years ago
- Final issue: October 2011; 13 years ago
- Country: United States
- Based in: Dearborn, Michigan
- Website: arabicamagazine.com
- ISSN: 1524-7880

ARABICA was a nationally distributed lifestyle, cultural and current affairs magazine for Arab-Americans and those interested in the news and views of the Arab-American community. Though aimed primarily at the Arab-American community, approximately a third of the readership was not Arab-American. It was published from Dearborn, Michigan by publisher Ahmad Chebbani.

== History ==
First published in May 1999, the magazine's founding editor in chief was Hasan Jaber, currently the director of the Arab Community Center for Economic and Social Services (ACCESS). He was followed after the second issue by Karim Alrawi when it was decided to re-orientate the magazine from a business publication to a broader readership based magazine. Deputy Editor was Chris Rizk, Articles Editor Lama Bakri and Creative Director Ali Chabbani.

ARABICA was the first Arab-American magazine to be carried by major bookstore chains in the USA.

== Editorial content ==
The editorial focus was on the needs and concerns of the Arab-American community. The glossy monthly featured stories about family, business, and culture, as well as the occasional feature on news and analysis from different parts of the Middle East. There were also stories on women's health, nutrition, children's television, technological innovation and the achievements of Arab-Americans.

Regular columns included Washington Update by Maya Berry, Lama At Large by Lama Bakri, Pet Peeves by Chris Rizk, New York Newsline by Saladin Ahmed, Writing in Restaurants and Last Word by Karim Alrawi.

A section titled The Book Nook carried book reviews, while the section Galleria Arabica ran reviews of arts exhibitions, movies, theatre, interviews with writers and artists, and translations from Arabic of short stories and poetry.

The section Mezza covered health and fashion while Grapevine carried a variety of short national and international news items.

Feature articles ranged from Pokémon and profiles of Arab American movie stars, like Salma Hayek and Tony Shalhoub, to politicians, Iraqi sanctions and Palestine. The magazine also published interviews with leading cultural and political figures from the Middle East, North Africa and the United States.

In 2001, ARABICA magazine received the Silver Award for production excellence presented by the Club of Printing House Craftsmen.

== Controversy and closure ==
ARABICA ran the occasional controversial article about human rights abuses and corruption in the Middle East. The March 2001 issue ran a feature article written by Karim Alrawi titled Egypt:The Uncivil Society in which he discussed the steady undermining of social and civil society institutions, the corruption and economic stagnation that were a consequence of the policies of the Mubarak regime. As a result, ARABICA was the target of harassment and threats by security and intelligence staff from the Egyptian embassy who arrived at the magazine's Dearborn offices. The local police were eventually notified, which brought an end to the harassment.

The day after the terrorist attacks of September 11, 2001 on the World Trade Center in New York, as a consequence of the immediate backlash against Arabs and Arab-Americans, ARABICA lost almost all of its advertising revenue. On the evening of September 12, 2001 the decision was taken to cancel the next issue of the magazine before it went to the printers. With no chance of regaining advertising it was decided, over the next several days, to close ARABICA permanently.

== Readership profile ==
Arabica Magazine, featuring Tony Shalhoub

A readership study conducted in 2000 by pollster John Zogby found that:

- Readership was over 100,000 per issue of the magazine
- 77% of readers were between 30 and 64 years old
- 44% had children under the age of 17 living at home
- 76% were college graduates with one or more degrees
- 43% had three or more degrees
- 66% were employed in professional and managerial positions
- 12% were business owners
