= Rose al Yusuf (magazine) =

Arabic weekly political magazine published in Egypt

Rose al-Yūsuf
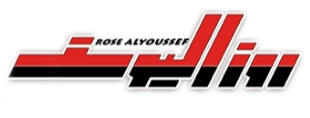
- Categories: Political magazine
- Frequency: Weekly
- Founded: 1925
- First issue: 26 October 1925; 100 years ago
- Country: Egypt
- Based in: Cairo
- Language: Arabic

Rose al-Yūsuf (Arabic: روز اليوسف; also written Rose al-Yousef) is an Arabic weekly political magazine published in Egypt.

== History and profile ==
Rose al-Yūsuf was first published on 26 October 1925. The magazine was named after its founder, Rose al Yusuf. It is published by the Rose al Yusuf group and is based in Cairo.

The founding editor of Rose al-Yūsuf was Mohamed El-Tabii until 1934. He had a great role in establishing the paper alongside its founder Rose al Yusuf, a Syrian-born female journalist. Other renowned Egyptian journalists worked later on as editors, including Mostafa Amin and Ali Amin. Armenian-Egyptian cartoonist Alexander Saroukhan drew the cover page of the magazine from March 1928 to 1934. Rakha and Zuhdi, Egyptian cartoonists, also contributed to the magazine.

Rose al-Yūsuf was started as a cultural and literary publication by Rose al Yusuf, but became a political magazine by 1928. In the early period the magazine was a fierce critic of the Wafd Party. In 1935, the publisher added a daily newspaper with the same name. Both are published in Arabic. Although Rose al-Yūsuf is a political magazine, it also covers entertainment news. In 1960 President Gamal Nasser nationalized the magazine, which began to be controlled by the Egyptian government. The magazine had a leftist leaning during the presidencies of Nasser and Anwar Sadat.

In 1957 Ihsan Abdel Quddus was the editor-in-chief of Rose al-Yūsuf. Since the government took control in 1960, the editors-in-chief of the magazine have been appointed by the Shura Council. Ahmad Hamrush was serving as the editor-in-chief of Rose al-Yūsuf in the late 1960s.

In July 2005 Abdallah Kamal was appointed editor-in-chief of Rose al-Yūsuf, replacing Mohamed Abdel Moneim in the post. He served in the post until 2011. In April 2011 Osama Salama became the editor-in-chief, but left his post when the Muslim Brotherhood came to the power. Essam Abdelaziz replaced him in the post. In 2014 Ibrahim Khalil became the editor-in-chief and served in the post until 30 May 2017.

On 31 May 2017, 36-year-old Hany Abdullah became editor-in-chief of Rose al-Yūsuf who was the youngest editor-in-chief since the nationalization of the press in Nasser's era.

The weekly sold 250,000 copies in 2000.

== See also ==
- List of magazines in Egypt
