= Mustafa Amin =

Egyptian journalist

Mustafa Fakhruddin Amin
- مصطفى أمين
- Born: 21 February 1914; Cairo, Egypt
- Died: 13 April 1997 (aged 83); Cairo, Egypt
- Education: American University in Cairo; Georgetown University, Washington, D.C.
- Occupations: Journalist, writer
- Years active: 1928–1997
- Relatives: Saad Zaghloul (great-uncle)

Mustafa Amin (Arabic: مصطفى أمين; 21 February 1914 – 13 April 1997) was an Egyptian columnist and journalist who enjoyed a great deal of popularity in the Arab world. Known for his liberal perspective, Mustafa Amin and his twin brother Ali Amin are regarded as the fathers of modern Arab journalism.

== Biography ==
Mustafa Amin and his twin brother Ali Amin were born in Cairo, where their father was a lawyer. They spent their childhood at the house of their great-uncle Saad Zaghloul, a prominent lawyer and politician, who founded the liberal nationalist Wafd Party (Delegation Party), and served as Prime Minister of Egypt in 1922. Amin was educated at the American University in Cairo and at Georgetown University in Washington, D.C.

Mustafa Amin made magazines for his family, neighbours, and schools since early childhood, and began reporting for the Cairo newspapers and magazines in 1928. He had a column in the weekly Akher Saa ("Last Hour") magazine by the time of graduation from the AUC in 1934. After his graduation from Georgetown in 1938, Amin served as editor-in-chief of Akher Saa for a year before moving to Al-Ahram ("The Pyramids"), the oldest and most prestigious Egyptian daily newspaper. During the 1940s, Amin served as a reporter and columnist, but in 1944 left his post as editor of El-Ethnin W El-Donya ("Monday And The World"), when he and his brother Ali founded the weekly newspaper Akhbar el-Yom ("News Today"). Within two years, they took over Akher Saa, and in 1951 founded two more weekly papers: Akher Lahza ("Last Trice") and Al-Guil ("The Generation"). Finally in 1952 they launched a daily newspaper Al Akhbar ("The News"). Amin and his brother were producing the five best selling news publications in Egypt prior to the nationalization of the Egyptian press by Egyptian President Gamal Abdel Nasser in 1960.

As an advocate of Western liberalism, free enterprise and a free press, Amin was first jailed in 1939, after criticizing King Farouk, and was also jailed briefly twice in the early 1950s by Nasser. However, in 1965 as Egypt developed closer relations with the Soviet Union, Amin was found to be in contact with American secret agent Bruce Odell, as documented by American ambassador Lucius D. Battle. Amin was arrested by Egyptian authorities and accused of treason. After a secret trial, he was imprisoned, tortured, and kept in solitary confinement for the next nine years, before eventually being exonerated and released in 1974 by Anwar Sadat. Mustafa Amin then returned to journalism, serving as editor of Akhbar Elyom ("News Today"). After the death of his brother Ali in 1976, Amin concentrated more on the syndicated daily column Fekra ("Idea"), which had been started by Ali in 1952.

In addition to his journalism, Mustafa Amin published autobiographical works, several novels, and also wrote film screenplays. He also lectured in journalism at Cairo University and the American University of Cairo. He founded the charity Lailat al-Qadar ("Night Of The Fate"), raising millions of pounds from donations, to pay medical expenses and provide business assistance for the poor. Mustafa and Ali Amin also encouraged the celebration of Mother's Day in Egypt.

Amin continued writing up until his death on 13 April 1997.

== Personal life ==
Mustafa Amin married Izis Tantawi and had 2 daughters, Ratiba and Safia. Safia is also a journalist. His twin brother Ali Amin also had two daughters, Fatma and Mona.
