= Akhbar el-Yom =

Egyptian weekly newspaper

Akhbar el-Yom أخبار اليوم
- Type: Weekly
- Founded: 1944; 82 years ago
- Language: Arabic
- Headquarters: Cairo
- Website: akhbarelyom.com

Akhbar el-Yom (Arabic: أخبار اليوم, lit. 'News of the Day' or 'Today's News') is an Arabic language government weekly newspaper published in Egypt.

== History and profile ==
Akhbar el-Yom was founded by the Amin brothers, Mustafa Amin and Ali Amin, on 6 November 1944. The paper is released weekly on Saturdays. The newspaper is owned by the Shura Council and considered a semi-official newspaper. It has a daily edition called al-Akhbar, which was also established by the Amin brothers.

The circulation of the paper in 2000 was 1.5 million copies.

== See also ==
- List of newspapers in Egypt
