= Al-Ahram (disambiguation) =

Al-Ahram (Arabic: ألأهرام, "The Pyramids") is a daily newspaper published in Cairo, Egypt.

Al-Ahram or Al Ahram may also refer to:

- Al Ahram Beverage Company, a Heineken brand
- Al-Ahram Center for Political and Strategic Studies, an Egyptian research institute specializing in political science
- Al-Ahram Studio, film studio in Cairo (1944–2024)

== See also ==
- Ahram (disambiguation)

=== Published by Al Ahram ===
- Al Ahram Al Arabi, a political weekly magazine
- Al Ahram Al Riyadi, a weekly sports magazine
- Al Ahram Al Iktisadi, a weekly business magazine
- Al Ahram Hebdo, a French-language weekly magazine
- Al-Ahram Weekly, an English-language weekly broadsheet
