= Muhammed Gwady =

Arab academician (1958–2023)

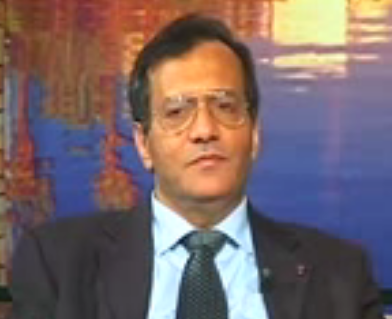
- Gwady in 2012
- Born: Muhammed Muhammed Gwady; 23 October 1958; Faraskur, Damietta, Egypt
- Died: 9 June 2023 (aged 64)
- Occupations: Doctor, writer, historian, professor and linguist.
- Employer(s): The New Egyptian Journal of Medicine and the Faculty of Medicine at Zagazig University.
- Notable work: In the Shadows of Politics
- Board member of: Academy of the Arabic Language in Cairo, Egyptian Scientific Institute, Egyptian Writers Union and Egyptian Academy of Scientific Culture.
- Awards: State Merit Award in Literature (2002) State Encouragement Prize (1982)
- Website: www.gwady.net

Muhammed Muhammed Gwady (Arabic: محمد الجوادي; 23 October 1958 – 9 June 2023) was an Egyptian academic, whose discipline included medicine, literature, history, criticism, language and political and developmental ideology. He was also a professor of cardiology at Zagazig University in Egypt.

Over the course of his scientific and practical history, he had made significant achievements, which qualified him to become the youngest Egyptian to receive eight high-level honors; he was the youngest member of Academy of the Arabic Language in Cairo 2003, Egyptian Scientific Institute 2008, Egyptian Academy of Scientific Culture 1978 and the Egypt Writers' Union 1979. He was also the youngest recipient of the State Recognition Award 2004, State Promotion Award 1982, Academy of the Arabic Language in Cairo Award 1978 and National Science and Technology Progress Award, First Class 1985.

From 1978, he published over 100 books of history, literature and translation, as well as hundreds of studies and articles. He had spent his career climbing the academic ladder until he was endowed a Professorship in Cardiovascular Medicine at the Faculty of Medicine of Zagazig University. In addition, he had held and took on many medical, scientific, journalistic, economic, cultural and humanitarian positions and responsibilities.

Gwady died on 9 June 2023, at the age of 64.

== Early life ==
Muhammed Gwady was born on 23 October 1958, in Faraskur, Damietta Governorate, Egypt.

=== Education ===
Gwady received his high school education in Ain Shams, Cairo. In 1985, he received master's degree in cardiovascular disease, with a thesis on acute myocardial infarction. In 1990, he received his PhD in cardiovascular disease, with a thesis on the assessment of cardiac dimensions and functions among the elderly. He was also a visiting fellow at Cleveland Clinic, Cleveland, Ohio, United States, since 1991.

== Work life ==
=== Occupations ===
Gwady worked as a Professor of Cardiovascular Disease at the Faculty of Medicine (Zagazig University), Editor-in-Chief of The New Egyptian Journal of Medicine, political adviser to the International Coalition for Egyptians Abroad (ICEGA), Chairman of the Foreign Affairs Committee and elected member of the National Council for Human Rights, he was also responsible for the German and European case of cooperation in this Council, and the National Committee to Combat Human Trafficking. He was also a member of the board of directors of the Drug Holding Company, Holdipharma and a member of the board of directors of the Holding Company for Biological Products and Vaccines, Vacsera. He was Al-Motafawkeen High School’s board of trustees’ chairman.

==== Advisory positions ====
- Adviser for the Military Medical Academy (1986-1990)
- Adviser for the General Authority for Information
- Adviser for Dar El-Shorouk
- Adviser for the Egyptian Publishers Association
- Adviser and seminar coordinator at Al Ahram Regional Press Institute (1997-2005)
- Lecturer, rapporteur for seminar and supervisor of political training at Decision Management Consultants (2002-2009)
- Lecturer and political training programs consultant at the Centre for Political and Strategic Studies
- Legal secretary for the General Union of Egyptians Abroad
- Membership in scientific and literary societies

Gwady was a member of the following societies:

- Academy of the Arabic Language in Cairo
- Egyptian Scientific Institute
- Egypt Writers' Union
- Egyptian Academy of Scientific Culture
- Scientific Culture Council of the Academy of Scientific Research and Technology
- Scientific Culture Committee of the Higher Council for Culture
- Egyptian Society of Cardiology
- Board member of Arab Office for Youth and Environment (AOYE)
- Chairman of the board of directors of the science and environment club at Zagazig University

=== Cultural contributions ===
Gwady supervised the medical education and Arabization program at Oxford Educational Resources, teaching journalism, establishing the Educational Media department at the Faculty of Arts of Zagazig University and translating medical articles for Scientific Medical Journal, the Arabic translation of Scientific American (1988-1996). He was a founding board member of Zagazig University Publishing House (1989-1994) and Zagazig University Press (1988-1994). He was also the director of the medical information center at Young Doctors Association (1985-1990). In addition, he supervised Zagazig University’s mobile medical clinics (1980-1981) and was a founding member of the science and environment club at Zagazig University and later became the club’s chairman of board of directors (1980-1985).

=== Science and social societies ===
Member of the Board of Directors of the Islamic Charity, the Board of Directors of the Egyptian Society for the History of Science, and Al-Motafawkeen High School Alumni Association. He was also a member of Atelier Cairo and the Egyptian Society for the Arabization of Sciences. He was the Head of the Cultural Committee in the Egyptian Society of Cardiology. Additionally, he was a member of the Writers’ Union, the Arab Writers Union and Arab Medical Union. Gwady was also a member of the Egyptian Society for the History of Medicine, the Egyptian Medical Association, Green Africa Youth Organization and the Arab Federation for Youth and Environment. He was a member of the Egyptian Society of Medicine and Law, the Alumni Association of the National Institute, Rotary International and Al-Rowad Association.

=== Major international activities ===
Gwady contributed to international scientific activities, most important of which is his membership in the European Society for Cardiology, the British Environment Council Committee for Drafting the Future of the Environment Report and the Salzburg Forum. He was the Rapporteur of the Anti-Noise Pollution Committee of the International Youth Forum (IYF).

=== Seminars and conferences ===
Gwady participated periodically (or annually) in cultural conferences and the Egyptian Writers Union, Egyptian Academy of Scientific Culture and the Public Authority for Culture Centers. He also participated in Egyptian writers’ conferences in the region, and in the celebrations of World Arabic Language Day and World Book Day. Gwady also annually participated in the conferences of the Academy of the Arabic Language in Cairo and represented the Academy in Arab Academy of Damascus’ conference.

Gwady regularly and periodically participated in the following scientific societies and their annual conferences:

- Egyptian Society of Cardiology
- Division of Cardiology (Echocardiography)
- Preventive Cardiology
- Pharmacotherapy

Gwady also participated regularly and periodically in the Egyptian Atherosclerosis Society, the Egyptian Hypertension Society (EHS) and the International Society of Cardiovascular Ultrasound (ISCU), as well as the Arab Medical Union. In addition, Gwady attended the Union’s conferences in Cairo, Tunisia and Baghdad. He continuously participated in the preparation of the annual conferences of Zagazig University Faculty of Medicine Cardiology Department, the Faculty of Medicine’s annual conferences, the University’s symposia and conferences, and celebrating World Hypertension Day (WHD).

== Works ==
=== Articles ===
Gwady produced many articles on politics, literature, history and development published on newspapers, magazines and websites such as Al-Ahram, Aljazeera.com, October, Rose al Yusuf and others.

Gwady published a large number of books from 1978, the following are some of his most major works:

First, works on the history of science and scientists:

1. Dr. Mohamed Kamel Hussein: A Scientist, Intellectual and Writer (original: al-Duktūr Muḥammad Kāmil Ḥusayn: ʻāliman wa-mufakkiran wa-adīban) [two different issues]
2. The Biography of Ali Mustafa Musharrafa (original: sīrat ḥayāt ʻAlī Muṣṭafá Musharrafah) [three different issues]
3. The Biography of the Scientist, Writer and Doctor Ahmed Zaki (original: sīraẗ ḥayāẗ al-ʻālim al-adīb al-duktūr Aḥmad Zakī) [two different issues]
4. Doctor Ali Pasha Ibrahim (original: al-duktūr ʻAlī Bāshā Ibrāhīm)
5. Dr. Naguib Mahfouz: Leading Gynaecologist and Obstetrician (original: al-duktūr Najīb Maḥfūẓ rāʼid amrāḍ al-nisāʼ wa-al-tawlīd)
6. Dr. Sulaiman Pasha Azmi: One of Our First Internists (original: al-duktūr Sulaymān Bāshā ʻAzmī awwalaṭibbāʼna al-Bāṭinīn)
7. Al-Hakim Al-Jarrah: Biography of Dr. Mohamed Abdul Latif (original: al-Ḥakīm al-jarrāḥ: sīrat ḥayāt al-duktūr Muḥammad ʿAbd al-Laṭif) [two issues]
8. Science Enthusiast: Dr. Ahmad Mustajir (original: ʻĀshiq al-ʻilm al-duktūr Aḥmad Mustajīr)
9. Islamic Medicine Prospects: Scientific Vision and Philosophical History (original: Āfāq al-ṭibb al-Islāmī: ruʼyah ʻilmīyah wa-tārīkh falsafī)
10. Al Khalideen Association History: Arabic Language and French Traditions (original: Tārīkh Majmaʻ al-khālidīn: al-lughah ʻArabīyah wa-al-taqālīd Faransīyah)
11. Heads of Arabic Linguistics Societies (original: Ruʼasāʼ al-majāmiʿ al-lughawīyah al-ʿArabīyah)
12. Al-Azhar University Sparking the Modern Arab Encyclopedic Renaissance (original: al-Jāmiʻ al-Azhar bāʻithān li-sharārat al-nahḍah al-ʻArabīyah al-mawsūʻīyah al-ḥadīthah)
13. The American Technique Contribution to Modern Cultural Renaissance of Syria (original: al-Shamʻah al-Amrīkīyah fī Nahḍat al-Shām al-thaqāfīyah al-ḥadīthah)
14. Egyptian Medical Expertise Guide and History of Medical Education in Egypt (original: Dalīl al-Khibrāt al-ṭibbīyah al-Miṣrīyah wa-tārīkh al-taʻlīm al-ṭibbī fī Miṣr)
15. Arab Mind Formation: Educational Thinkers’ Memoirs (original: Takwīn al-ʻaql al-ʻArabī: mudhakkirāt al-mufakkirīn wa-al-tarbawīyīn)
16. Stronger than Power: Professors of Medicine Memoirs (original: Aqwá min al-sulṭah: mudhakkirāt asātidhat al-ṭibb)
17. How They Became Great: Studies and Lamentations (original: Kayfa aṣbaḥū ʻuẓamāʼ: dirāsāt wa-rithāʼāt) [two editions]

Second, works on the history of human thought:

1. Professor Imam Sheikh Muhammad Abduh (original: Tārīkh al-Ustādh al-Imām al-Shaykh Muḥammad ʻAbduh)
2. Muhammad al-Khidr Hussain and the Jurisprudence of Politics in Islam Sheikh Al-Zawahiri and Al-Azhar Manner of Reform (original: Aš-Šaiḫ aẓ-Ẓawāhirī wa-al-iṣlāḥ al-Azharī)
3. Sheikh Al-Zawahiri and Al-Azhar Manner of Reform (original: Aš-Šaiḫ aẓ-Ẓawāhirī wa-al-iṣlāḥ al-Azharī)
4. The Sheikhdom Rulers: Biography of the Five who Combined Sheikhdom With Casuistry (original: Aṣḥāb al-mashyakhatayn: sīrat ḥayāt khamsat ʻulamāʼ jamaʻū bayna mashyakhatay al-Azhar wa-al-iftāʼ)
5. Living Through the Storm: Al-Baquri, Al-Bahi and Abd Al-Nasir (original: al-ʻaysh min al-Bāqūrī wa-al-bahī wa-ʻAbd al-Nāṣir)
6. Predicting Problems of Islamic Future (original: Istishrāf Ishkālīyāt al-mustaqbal al-Islāmī)
7. Al-Azhar Al-Sharif, Social Reform and Community Corrections (original: al-Azhar al-sharīf wal-iṣlāḥ al-ijtimāʻī wal-mujtama'ī)
8. Dialogues on Religion, Medicine and Politics (original: Ḥiwārāt al-dīn wa-al-ṭibb wa-al-siyāsah)

Third, works on the history of liberalism:

1. Leader of the Nation Mostafa el-Nahhas Pasha and Liberal State-Building (original: Zaʻīm al-ummah Muṣṭafá al-Naḥḥās Bāshā wa-bināʼ al-dawlah al-lībirālīyah)
2. Ali Maher and the End of the Liberal Period (original: Alī Māhir wa-Nihāyat ʻahd al-lībirālīyah)
3. Mohamed Mahmoud Pasha and Building a Minority State (original: Muḥammad Maḥmūd Bāshā wa-bināʼ dawlat al-aqallīyah)
4. Ismail Sidky Pasha (original: Ismāʻīl Ṣidqī Bāshā)
5. Uthman Muharram: Engineer of Egyptian Liberal Era (original: ʻUthmān Muḥarram: muhandis al-ḥiqbah al-lībirālīyah al-Miṣrīyah)
6. The Gambler, the Adventurer and the Obstinate: Mahir, Nokrashy and Mukarram (original: al-muqāmirwa-al-mughāmir wa-al-mukābir: Māhir wa-al-Nuqrāshī wa-Mukarram)
7. The Petulant Partners 1919 (original: al-shurakāʼ al-Mutshākisūn 1919)
8. Judiciary and Politics in the Time of Presidency: Eight Statesmen (original: al-qaḍāʼ wa-al-siyāsah fī zaman al-Riʼāsah: Thamāniyah min rijāl al-dawlah)
9. Before the Renaissance: Eleven Leader and Statesmen (original: Qabla Mashriq al-nahḍah: aḥad ʻashar min al-zuʻamāʼ wa-rijāl al-dawlah)
10. On the Verge of a Revolution: Memoirs of Ministers of the End of Monarchy (original: ʻAlá mashārif al-thawrah: mudhakkirāt wuzarāʼ nihāyat al-malakīyah)
11. Behind the Scenes of a Monarchy: Memoirs of Courtiers (original: Fī kawālīs al-malakīyah: mudhakkirāt rijāl al-ḥāshiyah)
12. In the Arms of Justice: Lawyers in Modern Egypt (original: Fī riḥāb al-ʻadālah: mudhakkirāt al-muḥāmīn fī ʻuṣūr Miṣr al-ḥadīthah)
13. In Moonlight: Memoirs of Leader of Covert Action and Assassinations (original: Fī ḍawʼ al-qamar: mudhakkarāt qādat al-ʻamal al-sirrī wa-al-ightīyālāt)
14. Secret Work of the 1919 Revolution: Memoirs of Young Delegates (original: al-ʻAmal al-sirrī fī thawrat 1919: mudhakkirāt al-shubbān al-wafdīyīn)

Fourth, works on the history of Egyptian military and national security:

1. The Only Victory: Memoirs of Egyptian Military Leaders (original: al-naṣr al-waḥīd: mudhakkirāt qādat al-ʻaskarīyah al-Miṣrīyah 1973) [two editions]
2. National Security of Egypt: Memoirs of Intelligence Leaders and Investigators (original: al-amn al-qawmī li-Miṣr: Mudhakkirāt qādat al-mukhābarāt wa-al-mabāḥith) [two editions]
3. Road to Setback: Memoirs by Egyptian Military Commanders 1967 (original: al-Ṭarīq ilá al-naksah: mudhakkirāt qādat al-ʻaskarīyah al-Miṣrīyah 1967) [two editions]
4. Militarization of Civilian Life: Memoirs of Officers in the Absence of War (original: ʻAskarat al-ḥayāh al-madanīyah: mudhakkirāt al-ḍubbāṭ fī ghayr al-ḥarb)

Fifth, works of the era of 1952:

1. Revolution and Freedom: Memoirs of Egyptian Women (original: al-thawrah wa-al-ḥurrīyah:mudhakkirāt al-marʼah al-Miṣrīyah) [two different issues]
2. Sayyid Mari: A Partner and Witness to the Times of Liberalism, Revolution and Openness (original: Sayyid Marʻī sharīk wa-shahīd ʻalá ʻuṣūr al-lībirālīyah wa-al-thawrah wa-al-infitāḥ)
3. Abd al-Latif al-Baghdadi: Martyr of Revolutionary Integrity (original: ʻAbd al-Laṭīf al-Baghdādī: shahīd al-nazāhah al-thawrīyah)
4. Trial of July’s Revolution: Memoirs of Legislators and the Judiciary (original: muḥākamat Thawrat Yūliyū: mudhakkirāt rijāl al-qānūn wa-al-qaḍāʼ)
5. Below and Above the Ground: The Estrangement of the Egyptian Left (original: Taḥta al-arḍ wa-fawq al-arḍ: ghurbat al-yasār al-Miṣrī)

Sixth, works on the Arab and Islamic history:

1. At Last, Palestinians Win (original: Al-Filasṭīniyyūn yantaširūna ah̲irā)

Seventh, works on the history of the government:

1. How They Became Ministers: A Study on Political Decision-Making (original: kayfa aṣbaḥū wuzarāʼ: dirāsah fī sināʻat al-qarār al-siyāsī)
2. The Governors (original: al-Muḥāfiẓūn) [two different issues]
3. History Reveals Its Secrets: Studies and Views on Sovereignty and Politics (original: al-Tārīkh yafshī ʼasrārahā: dirāsāt wa-ārāʼ fī al-sīyādat wa-al-sīyāsah)

Eighth, works on history writing and historians:

1. Successive Stars: On the Writing of Contemporary History (original: al-Nujūm al-mutaʿāqibah: fī kitābat al-tārīkh al-muʿāṣir)
2. Revealing Angles: In the Writing of Our Contemporary History (original: al-Zawāyā al-kāshifah fī kitābat tārīkhunā al-muʿāṣir)

Ninth, works on the history of literature, culture and the press

1. In the Shadows of Politics: Naguib Mahfouz (original: Fī ẓilāl al-siyāsah: Najīb Maḥfūẓ) [three editions]
2. On the Margins of Literature (original: ʻAlá hawāmish al-adab)
3. Is the Age of National Culture Over? (original: Hal intahá ʿaṣr al-thaqāfah al-waṭanīyah?)
4. Memoirs of Journalists: In the Service of Power (original: Fī khidmat al-sulṭah: mudhakkirāt al-ṣuḥufīyīn)
5. Contemporary Egyptians (original: Miṣrīyūn muʻāṣirūn) [two editions]

Tenth, works on developmental and educational thinking:

1. The Future of the Egyptian University (original: Mustaqbal al-Jāmiʻah al-Miṣrīyah)
2. Liberal Views on Education (original: Ārāʼ ḥurrah fī al-tarbiyah wa-al-taʻlīm)
3. Building Universities and Academies: Memoirs of Pioneers of Science and the Arts (original: Bināʼ al-jāmiʻāt wa-al-akādīmīyāt: mudhakkirāt ruwwād al-ʻulūm wa-al-funūn)

Eleventh, journeys:

1. Illusions of Love: Study of Female Emotions (original: Awhām al-ḥubb: dirāsah fī ʿawāṭif al-unthá) [three editions]
2. My Life in Germany (original: Ḥayātī fī Almāniyā)

=== Edits and reviews ===
==== Scientific journals ====
Some of the medical and scientific journals he edited and supervised are Zagazig University Medical Journal (ZUMJ), the Journal of the Egyptian Society of Cardiology, The Egyptian Journal of Applied Sciences (EJAS), Zagazig University Environmental Journal, the Egyptian Journal of Surgery, African Journal of Dermatology, the Journal of the National Cancer Institute, the Journal of Language, Culture and Civilization (JLCC), and the Journal of Environment and Society, Zagazig University.

==== Cultural journals ====
Gwady wrote for Al-Hilal, Al-Musawar, Al-Faisal Scientific, National Guard, Ebdaa, Rose al-Yūsuf, Al-Urdun Al-Jadid, Doha, Book World, Your Health, Future Science Journal, Al Ahram Al Arabi, Scientific Medical Journal, October, and Minbar al-Islam magazines.

==== Encyclopedias ====
Encyclopedia of Islamic Thought for the Ministry of Justice and Islamic Affairs (2002-2004). Encyclopedia of Egyptian National Figures for the State Information Service (1985-1993). Encyclopedia of Arab and Muslim Scholars and Writers for the Arab League Educational, Cultural and Scientific Organization (ALECSO). Lexicon of Arabic Literature for the American University. The Children's Encyclopedia of Kuwait. Glossary of Historical Terminology issued by Academy of the Arabic Language in Cairo. Encyclopedia of Islam for the Ministry of Justice and Islamic Affairs. Encyclopedia of Islamic Civilization for the Ministry of Justice and Islamic Affairs. Encyclopedia of Islamic Concepts and Aal al-Bayt Encyclopedia for Royal Aal al-Bayt Institute for Islamic Thought. Encyclopedia of 19th and 20th Century Egyptian Luminaries with Bibliotheca Alexandrina (2004-2011).

== Literary awards ==
- Damietta Province award (1970-1973)
- Academy of the Arabic Language in Cairo Award (1978)
- State Encouragement Prize (1983)
- Medal of Sciences and Arts
- State Merit Award in Literature (2004)
