= Al Ahram Al Riyadi =

Weekly sports magazine in Egypt

- Categories: Sports magazine
- Frequency: Weekly
- Publisher: Dar Al Ahram publishing house
- Founded: 1990
- Country: Egypt
- Based in: Cairo
- Language: Arabic
- Website: Al Ahram Al Riyadi

Al Ahram Al Riyadi is an Arabic weekly sports magazine published in Cairo, Egypt. It has been in circulation since 1990.

== History and profile ==
Al Ahram Al Riyadi was first published in 1990. It focuses on sports news. The magazine is published weekly by Al Ahram Organisation which also publishes Al Ahram Weekly, Al Siyassa Al Dawliya, Al Ahram Al Arabi, Al Ahram Al Iktisadi and Al Ahram.

Anwar Abdrabou and Ibrahim Hegazi are the former editors-in-chief of the magazine. On 28 June 2014, Khaled Tawheed was appointed editor-in-chief of the weekly. In September 2020 Muhammad Shabana Abdulaziz Badawi was named as the editor-in-chief of Al Ahram Al Riyadi.

The magazine sold 650,000 copies in 2000.

== See also ==
- List of magazines in Egypt
