= Al Ahram Al Iktisadi =

Weekly business magazine in Egypt

- Editor-in-chief: Khalifa Adham Ahmed Khalil
- Former editors: Lutfi Abdul Azim
- Categories: Business magazine Political magazine
- Frequency: Weekly
- Publisher: Dar Al Ahram publishing house
- Founded: 1958
- First issue: August 1958; 68 years ago
- Country: Egypt
- Based in: Cairo
- Language: Arabic
- Website: Al Ahram Al Iktisadi
- ISSN: 1687-0964
- OCLC: 7777840

Al Ahram Al Iktisadi (Arabic: الأهرام الإقتصادي) is a weekly business magazine headquartered in Cairo, Egypt. It is one of the publications produced by Al Ahram Organisation and has several sister publications, including Al Ahram Weekly, Al Siyassa Al Dawliya, Al Ahram Al Arabi and Al Ahram among others.

== History and profile ==
Al Ahram Al Iktisadi was designed based on the British business magazine The Economist and was first published in Cairo in August 1958. It is published by the state-owned Al Ahram Organisation on a weekly basis. The magazine has issued several supplements. Its target audience is primarily government officials and academics dealing with finance and economics.

== Editors ==
In the mid-1970s and at the beginning of the 1980s the editor-in-chief was Lutfi Abdul Azim. Shahira El Rafei served as the managing editor of Al Ahram Al Iktisadi. In September 2020 Khalifa Adham Ahmed Khalil was appointed editor-in-chief of the magazine.

A woman activist, Sana Al Misri, was working for the magazine in the 1980s, but she was fired due to her participation in the protests against Israel near to the Israeli embassy in Giza in October 1985. Although she won the case later, she did not continue her work at Al Ahram Al Iktisadi.

== Content and circulation ==
Although the magazine has been published a state-owned company and focused on economic affairs, it may adopt a critical approach against some policies and deal with political issues. For instance, Al Ahram Al Iktisadi published several articles in 1975 criticising the political economy implemented during the Nasser period. It also challenged the policies of the Sadat government. In addition, the magazine criticized the US aid activities in October and November 1982 arguing that these were a sort of American invasion creating a shadow government. Also, in November 1982 the magazine attacked the advertisements about the Islamic investment companies.

In 2013 Al Ahram Al Iktisadi sold nearly 30,000 copies.
