= Sherif Sonbol =

Egyptian photographer (1956–2023)

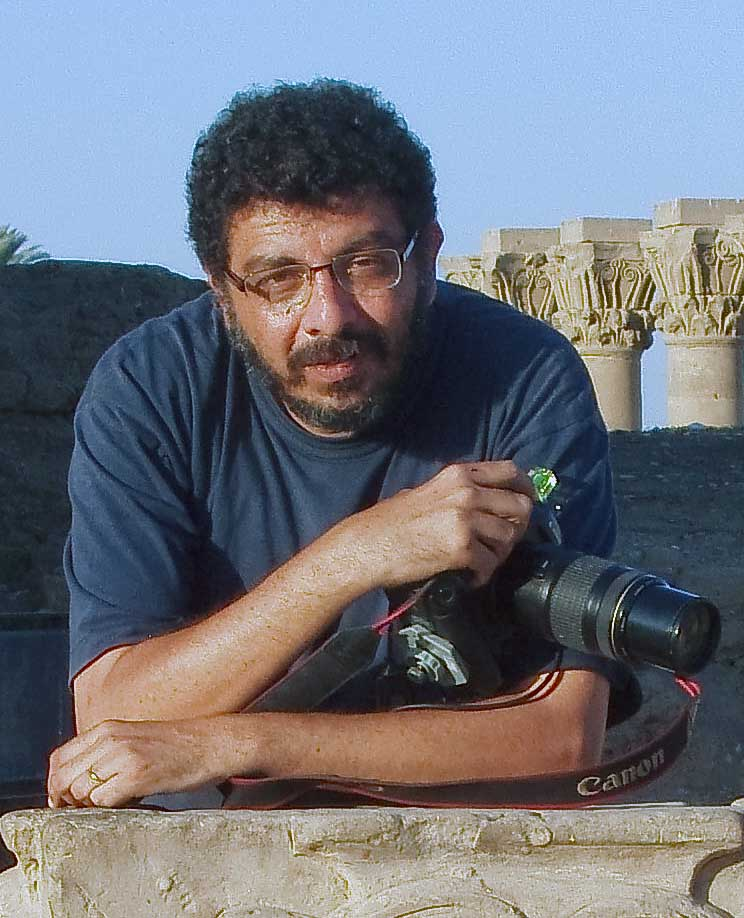
- Born: Sherif Sonbol; 6 December 1956; Giza, Egypt
- Died: 24 December 2023 (aged 67)
- Education: Autodidact
- Known for: Photography

Sherif Sonbol (6 December 1956 – 24 December 2023) was an Egyptian photographer specialising in architecture, scenic fine arts, and photojournalism.

== Early life ==
Sherif Sonbol was born in Giza, Cairo, Egypt on 6 December 1956.

Sonbol studied insurance at Cairo University and attended the Chartered Insurance Institute in London. He worked for the Egyptian Reinsurance Company as a marine underwriter. Around 1988 Sonbol decided to pursue one of his passions -photography- and tried his luck at Al-Ahram, where he soon started working as a freelancer.

== Career ==
It only took a few months for him to become a full-time photographer at Al-Ahram under the auspices of Antoun Albert.

Although achieving professional goals and popularity at Al-Ahram, at a certain point Sonbol saw the need of leaving the newspaper in order to be recruited by the American Embassy's as official photographer. This position did not occur but still the American Embassy employed him in its computer department as graphic designer and computer trainer for newcomers,

Sonbol managed to combine these roles with his work in the New Cairo Opera House, where he had been taking pictures since it opened its doors in 1988. Eventually Sonbol resigned his place at the American Embassy and returned to Al-Ahram; this time to the Al-Ahram Weekly.

Sonbol stayed six years as main photographer of Kalam-El-Nass. In his last year there, the Maraya-El-Nass magazine project saw the light. This was an interior design magazine belonging to the same group as Kalam-El-Nass. The project's key artistic responsibilities were to be writer Moguib Rushdi and himself, so he was fully transferred to the new magazine. Here too he managed to "shake the foundations of Egyptian interior photography with his use of natural light".

Later in life, Sonbol managed to combine his responsibilities as chief photographer in Al-Ahram Weekly and in the Cairo Opera House with other projects.

As a freelancer, he occasionally contributed to other publications — including Kalam-El-Nass. He participated in photography campaigns and other job assignments too. He also collaborated with important cultural centers such as the Bibliotheca Alexandrina. His work has been displayed in various exhibits worldwide and has been the subject of a doctoral thesis

Sonbol gave seminars at AFCA (Académie Francophone Cairote des Arts) and taught photography at the Ahram Canadian University. since 2008.

Through one of his later freelance projects, Sonbol tried to bring Western and Arabic cultures closer together in order to promote a better understanding and communication.

== Death ==
Sonbol died on 24 December 2023, at the age of 67.

== Technique and style ==
- One of Sonbol's trademarks was his use of natural available light; a technique he developed under the encouragement of Antoun Albert.
- An acute sense of timing is also characteristic of his images. This is especially evident in his ballet shots and The New York Times referred to it as "a particularly agile eye" adding that "Even when Sonbol concentrates on stillness, he exemplifies Martha Graham's adage that a pause is not a pose but "an act of accomplishment" ". Sonbol developed his eye for dance under the supervision of Erminia Gambarelli Kamel, former prima ballerina and currently artistic director of the Cairo Opera House Ballet.

== Critical reception ==
"Nothing is more beautiful than to express art through art…" -Naguib Mahfouz, Nobel Laureate

"Rare is the photographer who looks at a familiar art form and shows it in a new light. But Sherif Sonbol’s stunning and revelatory dance photographs [show] a particularly agile eye… apt to shoot from a catwalk above the stage or from the wings, frequently abstracting shapes into dynamic and explosive bursts of color." -Anna Kisselgoff, New York Times

"An artist has reached the pinnacle of his profession when his work can be recognised without his signature being written…" -Mounir Kenaan, leading Egyptian painter

== Books ==
- Opera 1988–1993, (Cairo Opera House 1993)
- Aida, (Cairo Opera House 1999)
- Pharaohs of the Sun: Akhenaten : Nefertiti : Tutankhamen, (Bullfinch & Boston Museum for Fine Arts 1999, ISBN 0-8212-2620-7 & ISBN 978-0-8212-2620-9) Contributor.
- Swan Lake for Children, (Cairo Opera House, 2000)
- Mulid! Carnivals of Faith, (AUC, 2001, ISBN 977-424-519-9 & ISBN 978-977-424-519-0)
- Mamluk Art: The Splendor and Magic of the Sultans (Museum with No Frontiers & Transatlantic, 2001, ISBN 1-874044-37-6 & ISBN 977-270-667-9)
- The Pharaohs, (Bompiani Arte & Thames and Hudson, 2002, ISBN 88-7423-023-0) Main contributor.
- Der Turmbau Zu Babel – Ursprung und Vielfalt von Sprache und Schrift (Kunsthistorisches Museum Wien & Skira, 2003, ISBN 3-85497-055-2 & ISBN 88-8491-534-1) Contributor.
- 40 Pyramids of Egypt and their neighbors, (Cyperus, 2005, ISBN 977-5052-17-3)
- 40 Pyramids of Egypt and their neighbors, Arabic version (Al Hayaa Al Masriya Al-Aama Lel Ketab, 2005, ISBN 977-419-690-2)
- Egyptian Palaces and Villas, (Abrams Inc & AUC, 2006, ISBN 0-8109-5538-5 & ISBN 978-0-8109-5538-7)
- The Churches of Egypt: From the Journey of the Holy Family to the Present Day, (AUC, 2007, ISBN 977-416-106-8 & ISBN 978-977-416-106-3). Second edition, AUC, 2012
- Arts of the City Victorious (Yale University, 2008, ISBN 978-0-300-13542-8 & ISBN 0-300-13542-4) Main contributor.
- Christianity and Monasticism in Wadi al-Natrun: Essays from the 2002 International Symposium of the Saint Mark Foundation and the Saint Shenouda the Archimandrite Coptic Society, Edited by Maged S.A. Mikhail & Mark Moussa, (AUC, 2009, ISBN 978-977-416-260-2) Cover image.
- Opera 1988–2008 (Cairo Opera House, 2009)
- Al-Tahra Palace, A Gem in a Majestic Garden (CULTNAT / Bibliotheca Alexandrina, 2009, ISBN 978-977-452-144-7)
- The Nile Cruise, an Illustrated Journey (AUC, 2010, ISBN 977-416-302-8 & ISBN 978-977-416-302-9)
- Wonders of the Horus Temple: The Sound and Light of Edfu (AUC, 2011, ISBN 977-638-900-7 & ISBN 978-977-638-900-7). Introduction by Zahi Hawass
- The History and Religious Heritage of Old Cairo: Its Fortress, Churches, Synagogue, and Mosque (AUC, 2013, ISBN 977-416-459-8 & ISBN 978-977-416-459-0)
