= Joshua Amponsem =

Ghanaian climate activist and entrepreneur

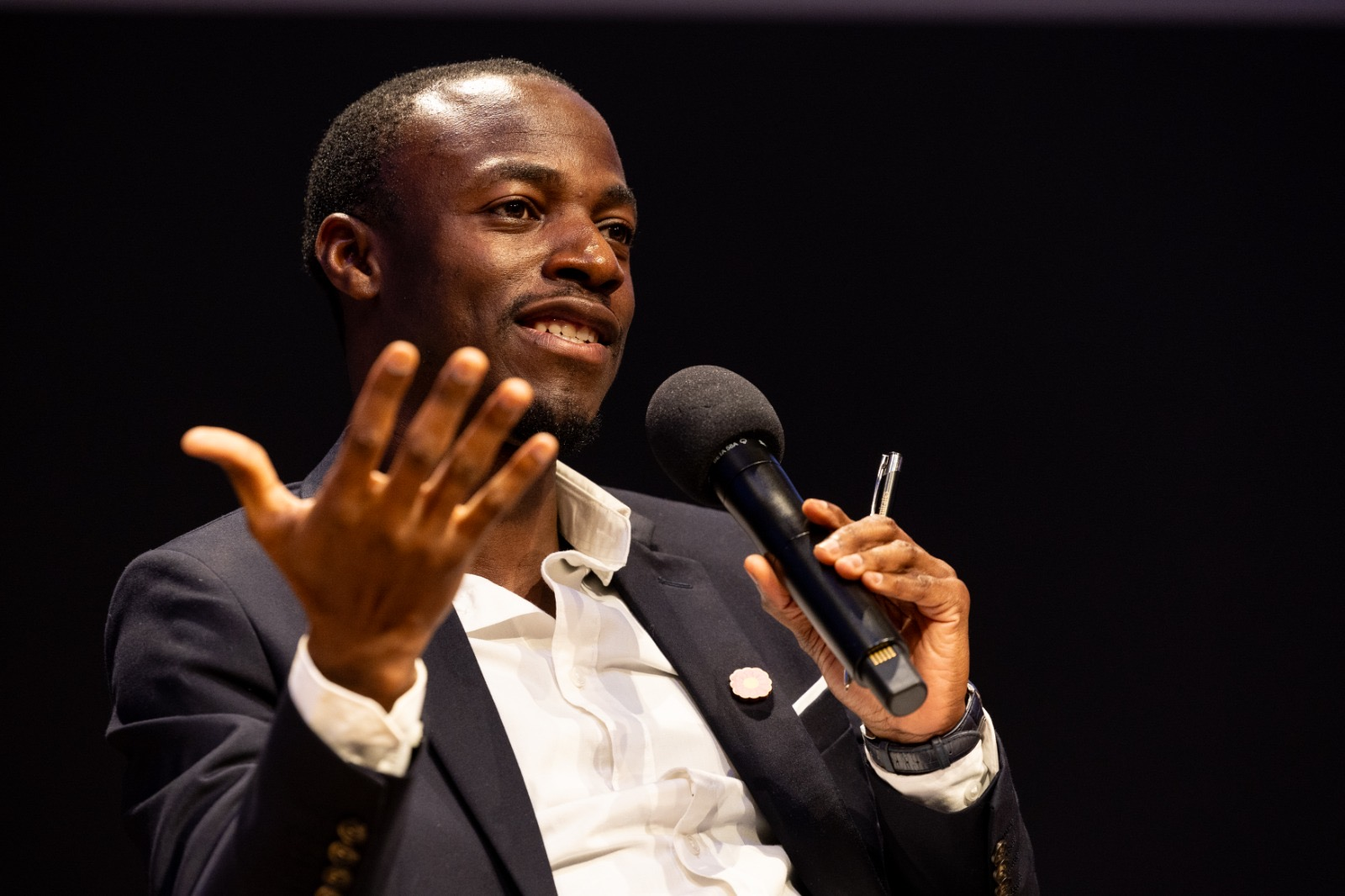
- Born: 8 August 1991 (age 35); Obuasi, Ghana
- Education: United Nations University, Institute of Environment and Human Security, University of Cape Coast
- Occupations: Climate and environmental activist, youth engagement expert, climate adaptation practitioner
- Years active: 2015–present
- Notable work: Founding Director, Youth Climate Justice Fund (YCJF) since 2023; Founder of Green Africa Youth Organization (GAYO); Adaptation fellow at the Global Center on Adaptation (GCA) since 2020
- Movement: International Youth Climate Movement

Joshua Amponsem (born 1991) is a climate advocate and the founder of Green Africa Youth Organization (GAYO). He was the climate specialist at the Office of the UN Secretary General's Envoy on Youth and the lead author of Adapt for Our Future, a research paper on the role of youth in climate adaptation. His work has focused on climate action, circular economy and climate change adaptation. He has contributed to scientific publications on waste management, resilience and a recent paper on Global Warming with James Hansen. He is a founding Director of the Youth Climate Justice Fund (YCJF) and advisory roles for TED Countdown, the International Renewable Energy Agency (IRENA), and the Quadrature Climate Foundation (QCF).

== Early life and education ==
Amponsem was born in Ghana. He studied Environmental Science at the University of Cape Coast, where he was first introduced to climate change, sustainability, and environmental risk.

He later pursued postgraduate studies in Geography of Environmental Risks and Human Security at the United Nations University Institute for Environment and Human Security (UNU‑EHS) in Bonn, Germany.

== Climate advocacy and philanthropy ==
Amponsem started climate advocacy in 2014 as a Bachelor student at the University of Cape Coast where he first learnt about climate change. Amponsem joined the Ghana Youth Environmental Movement to advocate for renewable energy in Accra. He founded the Green Africa Youth Organization as a student initiative to deliver climate solutions. His motivation is to "translate academic conversations from the classroom into practical solutions for communities".

Amponsem co-authored a book, The Power of the Feminine: Facing Shadow Evoking Light. In 2018, he attended the UNFCCC Adaptation Committee meeting and began advocating for climate finance to frontline communities.

Amponsem’s climate advocacy emphasizes locally-led leadership, funding to grassroots climate actors, and decolonising climate finance. He has been vocal about the need for philanthropic systems to shift power and resources toward frontline youth movements, highlighting that a disproportionally small share of global climate funding reaches grassroots organisations in the Global South.

He has also engaged with IRENA’s Global Council on Enabling Youth Action for SDG 7, advising collaborative efforts on sustainable energy and youth engagement.

== Initiatives ==
He has been an adaptation fellow at the Global Center on Adaptation (GCA) since 2020. He has been a voice for climate adaptation and the international youth climate movement. He attends key UN events as a speaker to discuss the importance of youth participation in climate action. He was one of judges of Afri-Plastics Challenge initiative where he called for investing in waste management innovation to tackle plastic pollution.

Amponsem previously served as Climate Lead at the Office of the United Nations Secretary‑General’s Envoy on Youth, where he contributed to initiatives designed to strengthen youth participation in global climate governance. In this role, he supported policy engagement, capacity building, and coordination between youth groups and international institutions.

Through the Youth Climate Justice Fund, Amponsem has participated in high-level dialogues and policy forums aimed at bridging financing gaps for youth-led climate justice efforts and strengthening trust-based, flexible funding mechanisms.

Amponsem is the lead author of Adapt for Our Future, a research paper focused on youth and climate adaptation. In addition, he serves as an advisor on climate philanthropy, youth leadership and systems reform, including advisory roles with TED Countdown and the Quadrature Climate Foundation (QCF), among other international initiatives.

== Writings ==
Amponsem has authored and co-authored a range of articles and opinion pieces published across international media and policy platforms, focusing on climate justice, youth leadership, and environmental governance. In December 2024, he published “The absurd inequality of climate work” with TED Talks Daily, examining structural inequities within the global climate sector and calling for institutional reform.

Amponsem also wrote “More power to youth: Doing climate philanthropy differently” for Alliance Magazine. His article “Why the world needs a treaty on plastic pollution,” published by the World Economic Forum Agenda, framed plastic pollution as a systemic climate and governance issue requiring international cooperation.
