= Ahram =

Ahram may refer to:

- Ahram, Iran, a city in Bushehr Province
- Ahram Rural District
- Ahram Canadian University
- Ahram clothing
- Transliteration of the Arabic word for pyramids, usually to refer to Pyramids of Giza

== See also ==
- Al-Ahram (disambiguation)
