= Zahi =

Zahi is a given name of Arabic origin. Notable people with the name include:

- Zahi Armeli (born 1957), Israeli football player
- Zahi Hawass (born 1947), Egyptian archaeologist
  - Zahi Hawass bibliography, list of all books and other works written, co-written, and/or edited by Zahi Hawass
