= Ibrahim Hegazi =

Egyptian journalist and politician (1944–2022)

- Born: 4 October 1944; Cairo
- Died: 3 January 2022 (aged 77)
- Occupations: Journalist, Television presenter, Sports journalist

Ibrahim Hegazi (April 1944 – 3 January 2022) was an Egyptian prominent pioneer sports journalist and politician.

He was Al-Ahram Magazine sports editor-in-chief for 19 years before leaving the position to join politics. He was appointed to the Egyptian Senate in 2021 and headed the Senate committee on Youth and Sports until his death in 2022.

== Career ==
Hegazi graduated from Higher Institute of Physical Education in El-Haram in 1967. He joined the Egyptian army and served in the special forces and parachute corps. He left military service in 1975 to join Al-Ahram newspaper as a reporter. Ten years after joining the Al-Ahram newspaper he won Mustafa and Ali Amin Prize for written journalism in 1985. In 1990, he established Al Ahram Al Riyadi (the first sports magazine in Egypt) and served as its editor-in-chief for 19 years. He was one of the most read Al-Ahram newspaper columnists and his weekly column appeared every Friday in the paper. while working with the magazine, Hegazi served in several positions on the Council of Journalists’ Syndicate as the head of its registration and committee and undersecretary in the organization. He also had stints in broadcast journalism where he presented several talk shows including Daaret Al-Doo’a’.

He was appointed to the Senate of Egypt by President Abdel Fattah el-Sisi in 2021. Whilst serving in the senate, he was elected chairman of Senate Committee on Youth and Sports.

He died on 3 January 2022 from COVID-19.
