= Anis Mansour =

Egyptian writer

Anis Mansour أنيس منصور
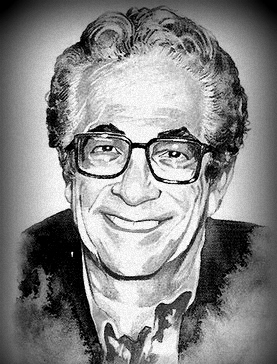
- Born: 18 August 1924; Mansoura, Egypt
- Died: 21 October 2011 (aged 87); Cairo, Egypt
- Occupations: Novelist, author

Anis Mansour, also transliterated as Anīs Manṣūr (Arabic: أنيس منصور, IPA: [ʔæˈniːs mɑnˈsˤuːɾ]) (18 August 1924 – 21 October 2011) was an Egyptian writer.

== Biography ==
Mansour was born in Al-Mansoura on 18 August 1924. He obtained his BA in philosophy at Cairo University in 1947 and started his journalistic career. He joined the staff of the newspaper Al Asas, later joining many other newspapers and magazines such as Rose al-Yousef and Al-Ahram. He served as the editor-in-chief of the magazine Akher Saa from 1970 to 1976. He became the editor-in-chief of the October magazine in 1976.

Anis wrote more than 170 books on many subjects, some of which were translated into French, Dutch and Russian. He translated about 200 short stories and more than 20 plays into Arabic. He introduced Alberto Moravia to the Arabic literature by being the first to translate his works. His most famous book is "حول العالم في 200 يوم : الحائز على جائزة الدولية / Ḥawla al-ʻālam fī 200 yawm : al-ḥāʼiz ʻalá jāʼizah al-dawlīyah", ("Around the World in 200 days") which documented his actual journey around the world in the early 1960s. The book details many facts and traditions of the countries he visited, including India, Japan, Australia (where he took interest in the local Lebanese community) and the United States, as well as his meeting with the Dalai Lama.

Anis died at age 87 in Cairo on 21 October 2011.

== See also ==
- List of Egyptian writers
