= Ragab Elbanna =

Egyptian Journalist, Writer, Editor and Publishing Executive

- رجب البنا
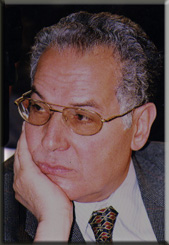
- Born: 17 September 1936 (age 90); Damanhour, Beheira Governorate, Egypt
- Education: Alexandria University; Cairo University
- Occupations: Writer, Journalist, Editor and Publishing Executive
- Title: Deputy editor-in-chief of Al Ahram (1987—1994), Chairman of Dar Al Maaref Publishing House (1994—2005), editor-in-chief of October magazine (1994—2005)

Ragab Moursi Elbanna (Arabic: رجب البنا; also translated as Rajab al-Bannā) (born 17 September 1936) is an Egyptian writer, journalist, editor and publishing executive. He regularly contributes to major Egyptian and Arab newspapers and is a past deputy editor-in-chief of Al-Ahram, considered Egypt's newspaper of record, editor-in-chief of October magazine, and Chairman of Dar Al Maaref Publishing House, one of the most famous in the Arab world. He is often cited as being amongst the most important and prolific writers in Egypt and the Arab world. He is a member of the Egyptian Society of Economics and Political Science.

== Background and Education ==
Ragab Elbanna was born on September 17, 1936, in Damanhour, El Beheira, Egypt. He is the son of Moursi El Banna. He received a Bachelor in Sociology and Philosophy from Alexandria University in 1960 and a Diploma in Journalism from Cairo University in 1971.

== Career ==
Between 1971—1980, Ragab Elbanna was a correspondent and writer for Al-Ahram newspaper. In these years, he was the newspaper's correspondent for the Ministry of Justice, the Council of State, the Administrative Prosecution, the Public Prosecution, and the State Lawsuits Authority, before being appointed first as editor of the local news desk, then Deputy Head of Investigative Journalism, then Head of the Investigative Journalism Department.

Elbanna went on to become assistant editor-in-chief of Al-Ahram between 1980—1987 and deputy editor-in-chief in the years 1987—1994. Between 1994—2005, he was Chairman of Dar Al Maaref Publishing House and editor-in-chief of October magazine, where he continued to write.

He has enjoyed warm relationships with many prominent Egyptians, of whom several have featured in his writing, such as Pope Shenouda III of Alexandria, Naguib Mahfouz, Mohamed Hassanein Heikal, Sheikh al-Sha'rawi and Grand Imam Sheikh Tantawi.

Elbanna's journalism continues to be published in several leading Egyptian and Arab outlets, including Al Ahram, Al-Masry Al-Youm, October magazine, and Al-Watan.

He is a member of the National Committee for Culture, Art and Literature, Cairo, the Higher Council of Islamic Affairs, Cairo and was a Professor of Journalism at Cairo University in 1974.

== Published Works ==
Ragab Elbanna's works are held by major libraries across the Middle East and beyond, including the Bibliotheca Alexandrina, UAE Federation Library, National Library of Tunisia, Stanford University Libraries, Harvard Library, University of Michigan Library, New York Public Library, Oxford Centre for Islamic Studies Library and Aga Khan Library.

His published books include:

- History Not For Sale (تاريخ ليس للبيع) (The Academic Library (المكتبة الأكاديمية), 1994)
- Searching for the Future (البحث عن المستقبل) (The Academic Library (المكتبة الأكاديمية), 1994)
- Religious Illiteracy and the War Against Islam (الأمية الدينية والحرب على الأسلام) (General Egyptian Book Authority, 1997)
- A Little Smile (Short Stories) (إبتسامة صغيرة) (1997)
- The West and Islam (الغرب والإسلام) (Dar Al Maaref, 1997)
- Copts in Egypt and the Diaspora: Dialogues with Pope Shenouda (الاقباط فى مصر والمهجر حوارات مع البابا شنودة) (Dar Al Maaref, 1998)
- Egyptians in the Mirror (المصريون في المرآة) (Dar Al Maaref, 2000)
- History of Copts in Egypt
- The West and Islam (الغرب و الإسلام) (Dar Al Maaref, 2001)
- Miracles of Creation and the Creator (2001)
- A Trip to China (رحلة الى الصين) (Dar Al Maaref, 2002)
- Manufacturing Enmity to Islam (صناعة العداء للإسلام) (Dar Al Maaref, 2003)
- America: A View from the Inside (أمريكا رؤية من الداخل) (Dar Al Maaref, 2004)
- Heikal: Between Journalism and Politics (هيكل بين الصحافة والسياسة) (Dar Al Maaref, 2004)
- Shi'a and Sunni Islam: Differences in Jurisprudence, Thought, and History (الشيعة و السنة و اختلافات الفقه و الفكر و التاريخ) (Dar Al Maaref, 2004)
- Fair-Minded People about Islam in the West (المنصفون للإسلام في الغرب) (Dar Al Maaref, 2005)
- With Sheikh al-Sha'rawi (مع الشيخ الشعراوي) (Dar Al Maaref, 2011)
- The Life of Taha Hussein: From "Incapable" to "Miracle" (حياة طه حسين : من "عاجز" إلى "معجزة") (The Academic Library (المكتبة الأكاديمية), 2018)
- Why Did Muslims Fall Behind? (لماذا تخلف المسلمون؟) (The Academic Library (المكتبة الأكاديمية), 2018)
- The Life of King Farouk: The Beginning, the End, and Why the July 1952 Revolution Occurred (حياة الملك فاروق :البداية و النهاية و لماذا قامت ثورة يوليو 1952) (The Academic Library (المكتبة الأكاديمية), 2019)
- The Sons of Muhammad Abduh, Reformers in Islam (أبناء محمد عبده المجددون في الإسلام) (The Academic Library (المكتبة الأكاديمية), 2023)
- Memories of Sweet Days and Lost Years (Memoirs) (ذكريات أيام حلوة وسنوات ضائعة) (Dar Al Maaref, 2025)

He also edited and wrote the foreword to the book Why Do We Read? (لماذا نقرأ؟) (Dar Al Maaref, 2000), which features the work of prominent Egyptian thinkers such as Dr. Taha Hussein, Abbas Mahmoud al-Aqqad and Dr. Husayn Fawzi.

His website can be found at: Ragab Elbanna Website.

== Awards ==
Ragab Elbanna has received many awards for his contributions to Egyptian journalism and writing, including:

Excellence Shield from Cairo University.

Recognition from the Egyptian Television Cultural Channel - Writer of the Year Award 2002.

Shield from the Institute for Leadership Development in Helwan for outstanding efforts in training university students.

1997, Family Library Shield.

Recognition and Best Book Award in the following years:

1996 for the book "Religious Illiteracy and the War Against Islam."

1998 for the book "The Copts in Egypt and the Diaspora."

1999 for the book "Searching for the Future."

2000 for the book "The West and Islam."

2001 for the book "Miracles of Creation and the Creator."

2002 for the book "Manufacturing Enmity Towards Islam."
