= Al Siyassa Al Dawliya =

Egyptian news magazine and website

- Editor-in-chief: Ahmed Nagui Kamha
- Former editors: Osama Al Ghazali Harb
- Categories: Political affairs and international politics
- Frequency: Quarterly
- Publisher: Al-Ahram foundation
- Founded: 1965
- First issue: July 1965
- Company: Al-Ahram foundation
- Country: Egypt
- Based in: Cairo, Egypt
- Language: Arabic
- Website: Siyassa
- ISSN: 1110-8207
- OCLC: 2166058

Al Siyassa Al Dawliya (Egyptian Arabic: السياسة الدولية, romanised: al-Siyāsah al-dawlīyah, lit. 'The International Politics Journal') is Egyptian quarterly magazine published by Al Ahram publishing house in Cairo, Egypt. Founded in 1965, the magazine is one of the earliest publications on international politics. It produces content daily on its website, and in four print issues annually. The publishing house also owns Al Ahram and Al Ahram Weekly, two of significant publications in the country.

== History and profile ==
Al Siyassa Al Dawliya was founded in 1965, and its first issue appeared in July 1965. The magazine is published by Dar Al Ahram publishing house and models Foreign Affairs. Osama Al Ghazali Harb served as editor-in-chief of the quarterly from 1977 to 2010. Awad Khalil was appointed editor-in-chief of the magazine in August 2012.

The magazine is based in Cairo. In the first part of the 1970s the magazine sold 10,000 copies.

== Content ==
Al Siyassa Al Dawliya focuses on political affairs and international politics. The magazine also covers scholarly articles on these topics.

The magazine published an exceptional article on the assassination of Yitzhak Rabin in November 1995 focusing on the degree of opposition in Israel to the peace between Israel and Palestinians. Because the other Arab publications mostly considered the murder as a reflection of the frequent violence in Israel. In February 2004 Osama Al Ghazali Harb supported the capture of Saddam Hussein in an editorial which also criticised those Arabs who opposed the way of his arrest by the US.

== See also ==
- List of magazines in Egypt
