= Zahi Hawass bibliography =

This is a self-published list of all books and other works where Egyptologist Zahi Hawass has appeared as author or editor.

The list is in chronological order.

== 1980s ==
Title	Publication Date	Publisher
"The Funerary Establishments of Khufu, Khafra and Menkaura during the Old Kingdom" (Ph.D. thesis)	1987	Graduate School of Arts and Sciences, University of Pennsylvania

== 1990s ==
Title	Publication Date	Publisher
The Pyramids of Ancient Egypt	April 1990	Premier Book Marketing Ltd.
The Secrets of the Sphinx: Restoration Past and Present	September 1, 1998	The American University in Cairo Press

== 2000 to present ==
Title	Publication Date	Publisher
Silent Images: Women in Pharaonic Egypt	April 1, 2000	Harry N. Abrams, Inc.
Valley of the Golden Mummies: The Greatest Egyptian Discovery Since Tutankhamun	October 1, 2000	Harry N. Abrams, Inc.
The Mysteries of Abu Simbel: Ramesses II and the Temples of the Rising Sun	April 1, 2001	The American University in Cairo Press
Hidden Treasures of the Egyptian Museum	January 2003	The American University in Cairo Press
Egyptology at the Dawn of the Twenty-first Century: Proceedings of the Eighth International Congress of Egyptologists, Cairo, 2000 (Volume 1)	April 1, 2003	The American University in Cairo Press
Egyptology at the Dawn of the Twenty-first Century: Proceedings of the Eighth International Congress of Egyptologists, Cairo, 2000 (Volumes 2-3)	May 1, 2003	The American University in Cairo Press
Bibliotheca Alexandrina	August 1, 2003	The American University in Cairo Press
Egyptian Museum Collections Around the World: Studies for the Centennial of the Egyptian Museum, Cairo	September 1, 2003	The American University in Cairo Press
Secret from the Sand: My Search for Egypt's Past	October 1, 2003	Harry N. Abrams, Inc.
The Treasures of the Pyramids	November 13, 2003	White Star Publishing
Cradle and Crucible: History and Faith in the Middle East	February 1, 2004	National Geographic Books
Tesoros De Las Piramides	February 2, 2004	Oceano De Mexico
Curse of the Pharaohs: My Adventures with Mummies	May 1, 2004	National Geographic Books
Hidden Treasures of Ancient Egypt	May 2004	National Geographic Books
Curse of the Pharaohs	May 2004	National Geographic Books
The Golden Age of Tutankhamun	August 30, 2004	The American University in Cairo Press
The Island of Kalabsha	September 2004	The American University in Cairo Press
Le Tombeau de Menna	January 2005	The American University in Cairo Press
Tutankhamun: The Mysteries of the Boy King	February 1, 2005	National Geographic Books
Tutankhamun and the Golden Age of the Pharaohs	May 2005	National Geographic Books
How the Great Pyramid Was Built	May 2, 2006	HarperCollins
The Golden King: The World of Tutankhamun	May 16, 2006	National Geographic Books
Mountains of the Pharaohs: The Untold Story of the Pyramid Builders	August 22, 2006	Doubleday
The Realm of the Pharaohs	October 27, 2006	White Star Publishing
Bilder der Unsterblichkeit	October 31, 2006	Zabern Philipp von GmbH
The Royal Tombs of Egypt: The Art of Thebes Revealed	November 27, 2006	Thames & Hudon Ltd.
The Giza Plateau Mapping Project: Project History, Survey, Ceramics, and the Main Street and Gallery Operations	December 30, 2006	Ancient Egypt Research Associates
The Archaeology and Art of Ancient Egypt: Essays in Honor of David B. O'Connor	April 19, 2007	The American University in Cairo Press
Pyramids: Treasures, Mysteries, and New Discoveries in Egypt	September 11, 2007	White Star Publishing
Annales du Service des Antiquities de L'Egypte	October 30, 2007	Ministere de La Culture Conseil Supreme Des A
Treasures of Ancient Egypt	November 2007	White Star Publishing
King Tutankhamun: The Treasures of the Tomb	December 3, 2007	Thames & Hudson Ltd.
Tutankhamun: The Golden King and the Great Pharaohs	September 16, 2008	National Geographic Books
Royal Mummies: Immortality in Ancient Egypt	September 23, 2008	White Star Publishing
Wonders of the Horus Temple: The Sound and Light of Edfu (with photographs by Sherif Sonbol)	March, 2011	The American University in Cairo Press
Ramses and the Gold of the Pharaohs	2021	Laboratoriorosso
