= Alaa Thabet =

Egyptian journalist

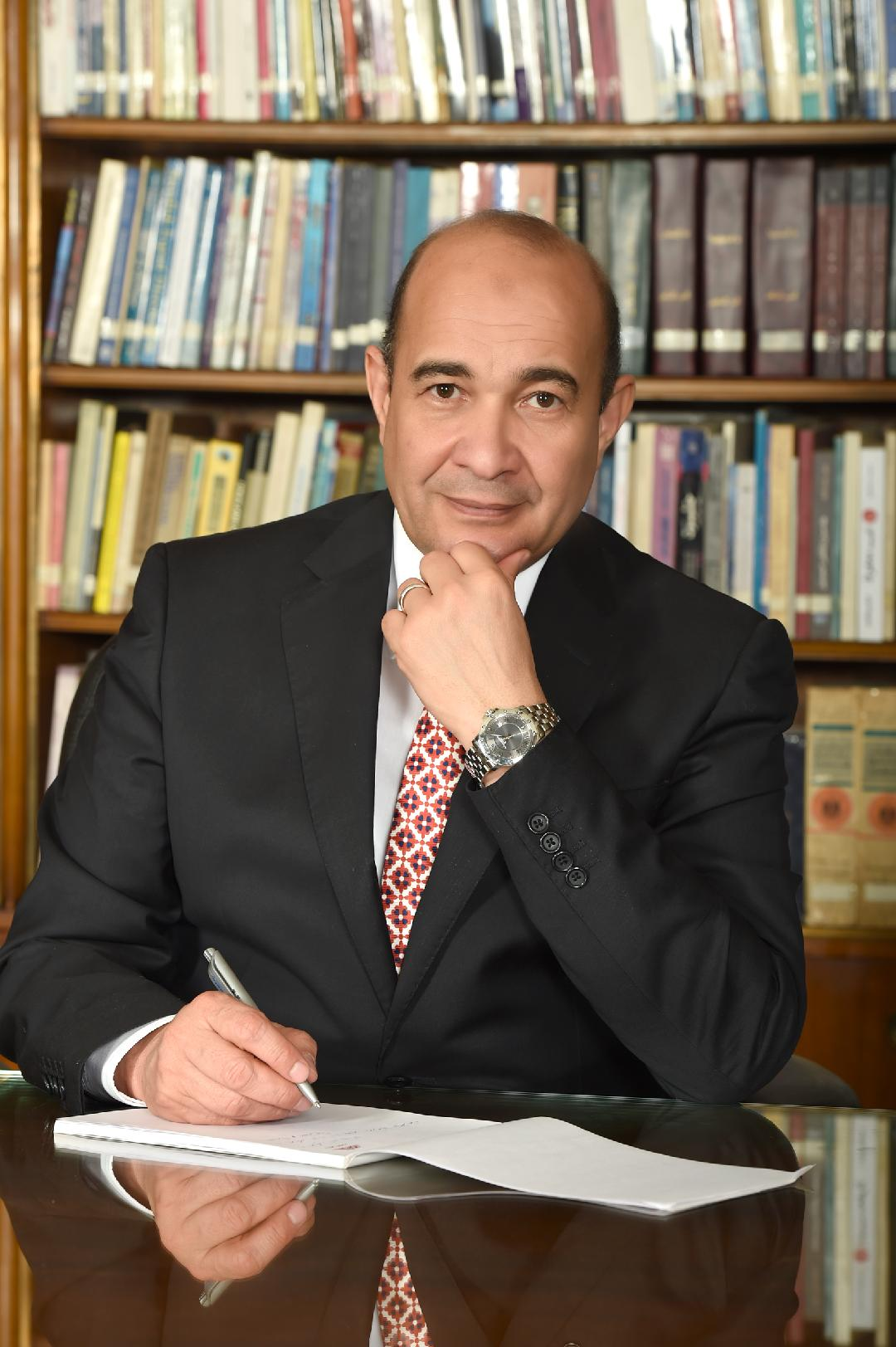
- Alaa Thabet
- Born: 12 December 1965 (age 59); Cairo, Egypt
- Education: Al-Azhar University, Cairo
- Occupation: Journalist

Alaa Thabet is an Egyptian journalist and currently the editor-in-chief of the Al-Ahram Newspaper and a member of the board of directors of the Al-Ahram Foundation.

== Academic life ==
He graduated from the Faculty of Economics and Political Science at Cairo University in 1992. He received a Diploma of Advanced Studies in the US in 2006 in journalism and editorial administration. He has participated in a number of important conferences around the world, including in Canada, Turkey, the US, Japan, the UAE, and other countries.

== Career ==
After graduating, he worked as a journalist for Al-Nour newspaper in 1988. He was a journalist for Al-Watan newspaper in Cairo in 1989 and a journalist for the Cairo bureau in 1990. He was a journalist and education correspondent for the Gulf newspaper of Kuwait and Al-Qabas in 1991. He was a journalist in 1991, and was a participant in the strategic report of Al-Ahram for many years, Al-Ahram strategic booklets, head of the education department and supervisor of readers' mail in Al-Ahram Evening newspaper in 1994, Al-Ahram Evening in 2004, and Assistant Editor-in-Chief of Al-Ahram Evening in 2007. He was the editor-in-chief of Al-Ahram Evening in the period from April 2011 to August 2012, and from 28 June 2014 until 31 May 2017.

== Syndicate work ==
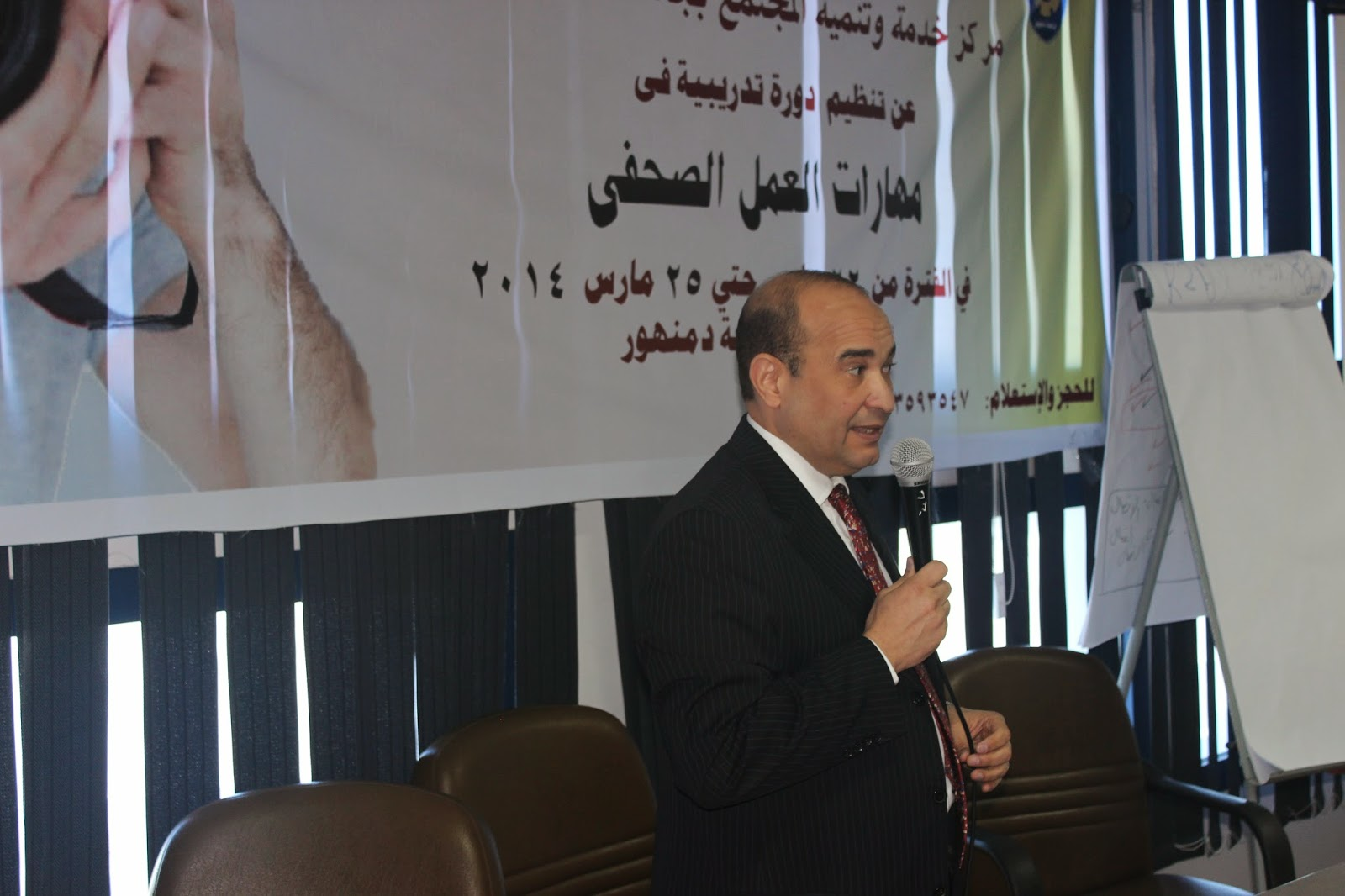
During a lecture titled "Professional and Ethical Standards in Journalism" at Benha University

For eight years, he was a member of the Council through two sessions. He served as Deputy Press Syndicate, Chairman of the Disciplinary Board and member of the Registration Committee. He presented a successful period in trade union work. He chaired several committees: Housing, Pensions, Culture and other activities.

== National Press Agency ==
He was elected as a member of the National Press Agency, where Oath at the Parliament of Egypt 11 April 2017, and was the first statement that his choice of a new mandate from the state, and was signed by the Egyptian President Abdel Fattah Sisi. He resigned from the National Press Commission on 31 May 2017 after being selected in the recent press changes of the boards of directors and editors of the national newspapers.

== His works ==
He contributed many contributions to the writing of children presented to the Egyptian television over the years, including his participation in writing a script series stories of the prophets in the Quran, and directed by Dr. Zeinab Zamzam dealt with many aspects of humanity in the lives of prophets and messengers, and presented a different model in dealing with human relations established by Muhammad, a series of films that led to the award of the Cairo Radio and Television Festival, three international awards from India, the Beijing Festival Award and the Interfaith Dialogue Center in Texas. In continuation of the success of the first series, a new series entitled "Missionaries in Paradise" And the positions of Abu Bakr al-Siddiq, Omar ibn al-Khattab, Uthman ibn Affan, Ali ibn Abi Talib, Saad ibn Abi Waqas .. and others, by simplifying and depth suits the children.

He finished writing screenplay for the animated film "Prophet of Mercy" in 2015, which did not see the light for productive reasons. The film deals with the human aspect in the life of Muhammad, in the framework of efforts to correct misconceptions about the Muhammad in particular and the Islamic religion in general, and address the minds of adults and children.

He published several publications, including the book "Higher Education in Egypt" in which he reviewed the policies of higher education in Egypt and put his experiences in the field of education has been honored in this regard from more than one, including the University of Ain Shams in 1997 for its activity in the cause of literacy. In addition to several books published by the Center for Political and Strategic Studies in Al-Ahram, including the book "Ministry of Higher Education", which is part of the series of examination of institutional and functional development of the Egyptian ministries, where the book examines the dilemma of how to create a flexible centralization that allows to respond to the variables of civil society and interact positively with external variables at the same time, it allows its core functions to be built as a society characterized by resource scarcity, poor consumption and poverty. The aim of this series is to open a broad dialogue between the forces of society in order to establish a correct mechanism for the formulation of public policies in Egypt.

== Lectures ==
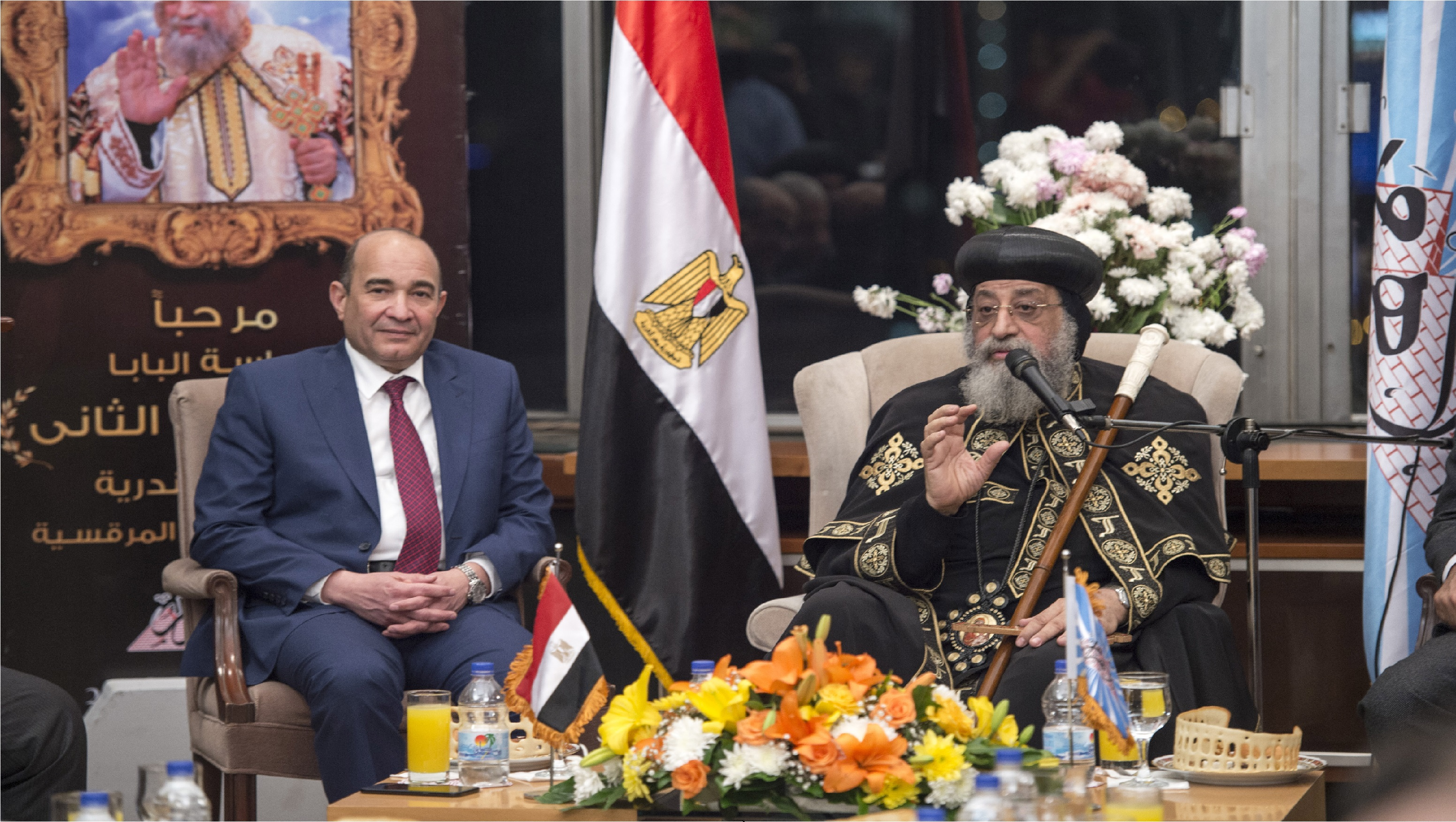
In the historical visit of Pope Taoudaros Pope of Alexandria and Patriarch of the preaching of the Al-Ahram newspaper

Thabet presented several lectures in a number of Egyptian and Arab universities, including a lecture titled "The Future of Paper Press in the Arab World" organized by the King Faisal Center for Research and Islamic Studies in Saudi Arabia on 22 October 2018, where he stressed that any modern media means do not lead to the extinction of means The oldest of which is the electronic press. The press does not cancel the paper press, as it presented a set of solutions to preserve the paper press and the digital press. The paper press tended to diversify its media activities. While maintaining the independent personality of the electronic newspapers, which have developed to be news, media and entertainment gateways with an independent personality. In addition to the training and development of editors to deal with the data and requirements of the digital age with all its modern tools, and to make room for investigative and analytical journalism and reporting so that the paper press to the depth press and deal with the digital in a manner suited to the rapid pace that characterizes it, and attention to what the public wants a variety of topics, and interact with readers.
