= Sabah Hamamou =

Egyptian journalist

Sabah Hamamou (صباح حمامو) is an Egyptian journalist, the acting head of business section at Al-Ahram

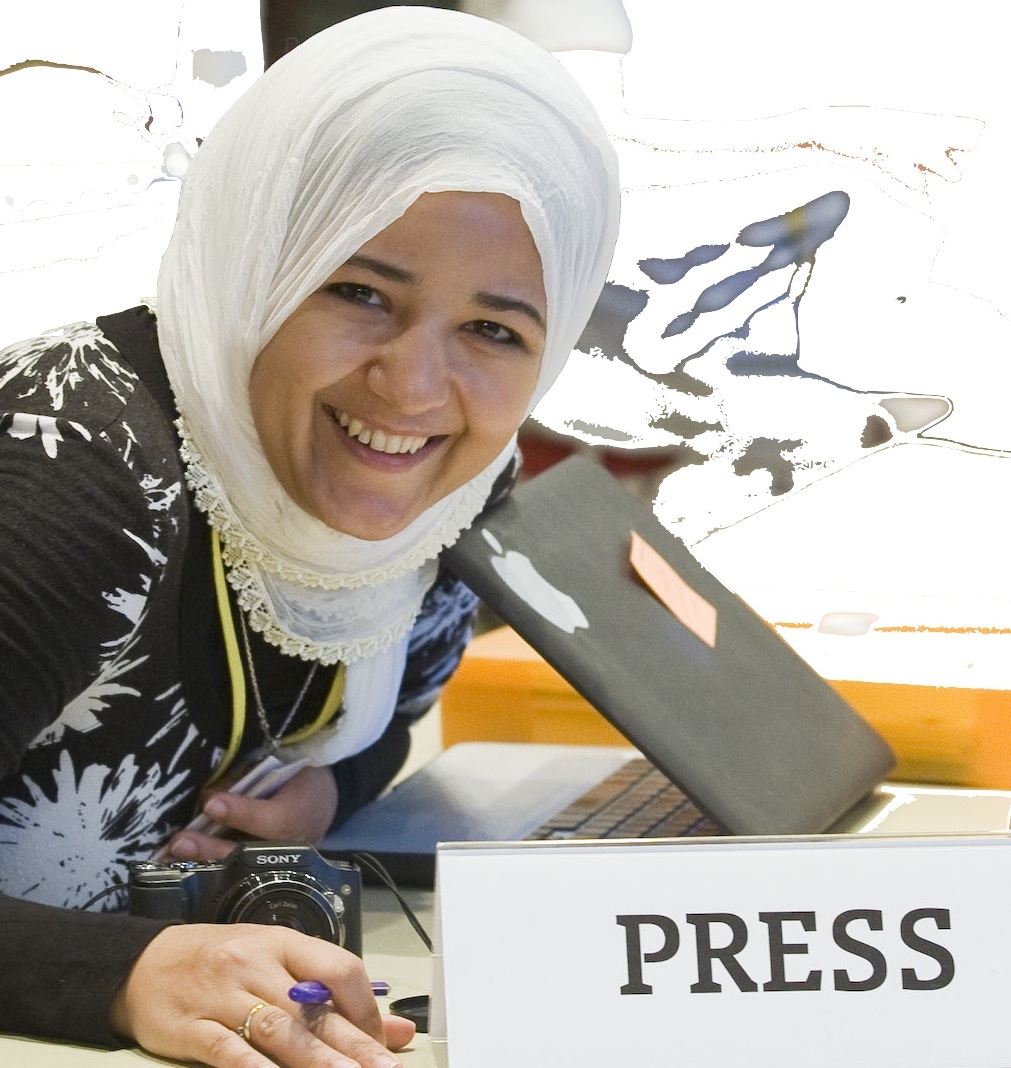
Lindau -Germany 2011 By: Darko Tomas

== Professional ==
Hamamou started her career in 1994 as a general assignment trainee reporter at one of Al-Ahram's publications, the monthly Al-Shabab magazine, while at the same time attending Cairo University. After she obtained a BA in Arabic and literature in 1997, she decided to dedicate her career to journalism. In addition to working for Al-Shabab, she began to write pieces for the Saudi Al-Jazeera, a world-famous daily newspaper, Al-Maraa Al-Youm, an independent Emirati weekly magazine, and Al-Qahira, an Egyptian government owned weekly newspaper, as well as other publications.

In 2003, she was offered a permanent position at Al-Ahram's daily newspaper as a staff writer in the business section. Despite having no previous experience in business journalism, Although she began her career in print-media, she occasionally produces video reports and maintains a blog and professional profiles on various social media networks.

== Egyptian Revolution ==
Hamamou covered the Egyptian Revolution of 2011 for the Al-Ahram website and for her own online channel Masrawyya, Al-Ahram wrote a piece on Masrawyya calling it The Revolution Channel
Sabah Hamamou became a frequent commentator on Egyptian Revolution of 2011 and on Media in Egypt, she was Interviewed by BBC and Newsweek Time, the Wall Street Journal, The World and Associated Press. She also wrote for Harvard's Nieman Foundation for Journalism Egyptian Journalism: An Oddly Connected Mix of Old and New Media

== Book Author and a Publisher ==
Hamamou wrote the book Memoirs of a journalist at Al-Ahram, in June 2012, to speak up about how Al-Ahram was managed under Mubarak regime, the first such account by a journalist at Al-Ahram since it was founded in 1876.
In May 2013 she founded Ha'aa (حاء), a publishing house to support the values of The Egyptian Revolution, 'Right', ' Right of life', ' Freedom', all the words would start in Arabic with the very same letter ( ح ) which happen to be the first letter of Sabah Hamamou Family name ( حمامو)

== Honors ==
She has received several awards and fellowships for her work in journalism, including:

Best Journalist Certificate of Merit from Al- Ahram Regional Institute For Journalism, 2003.

Middle East and North Africa Media Fellowship from Northwestern University, 2006.

Knight Wallace Fellowship, University of Michigan: In 2010, Hamamou was the first Egyptian journalist to be awarded this prestigious Fellowship.
