= Ahram Canadian University =

Private university in 6th of October, Egypt

Coordinates: 29°56′07″N 30°52′58″E

Ahram Canadian University جامعة الاهرام الكندية
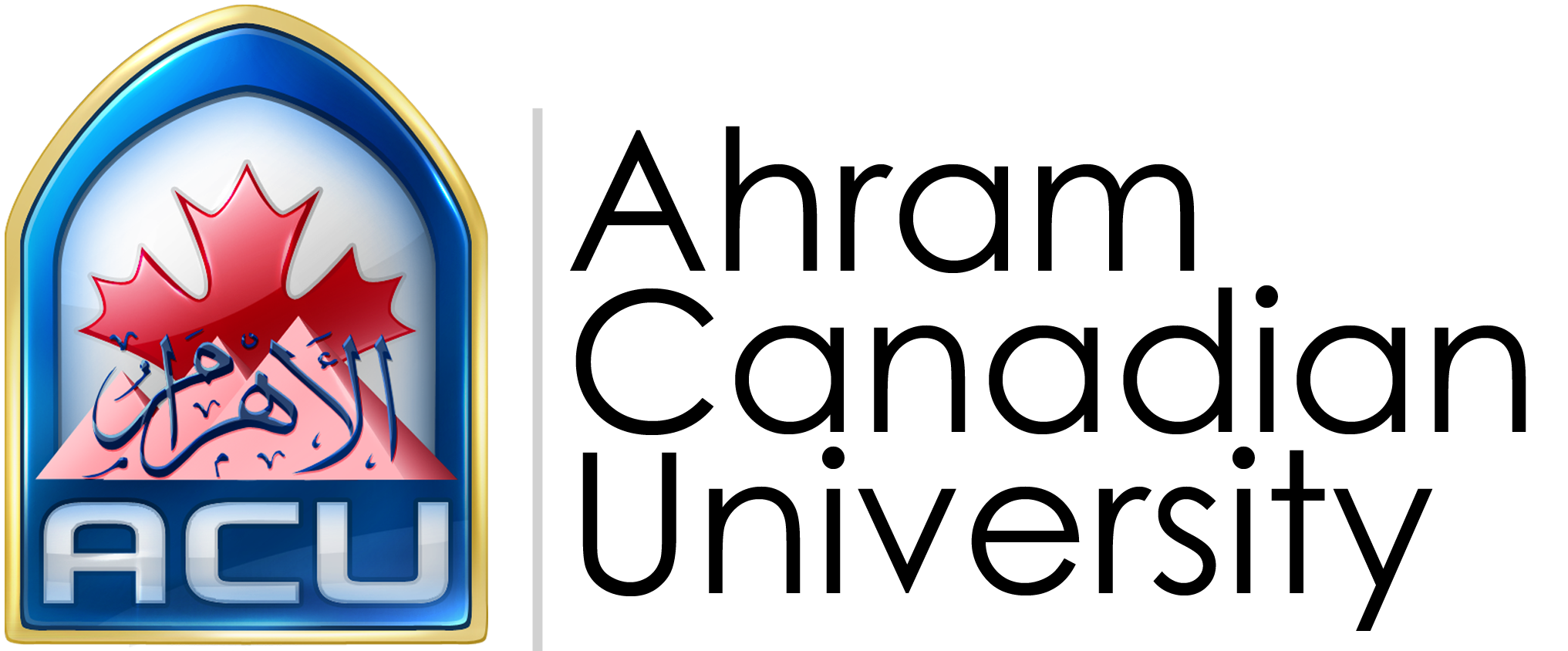
- Type: Private
- Established: October 2005
- Chairman: Dr. Mohamed Fayez Farahat
- President: Professor Dr. khaled Hamdy Abdel Raman
- Location: 6th of October City, Egypt

Al-Ahram Canadian University (ACU; Arabic: جامعة الاهرام الكندية) is a private non-profit university in 6th of October City, Egypt. It was established by the Al-Ahram newspaper in 2005. In addition to its various faculties, the university runs specialized centers including the Center of Excellence, the Educational Center of Dental Medicine, the Center of Media Studies, the Research Center for Administrative and Economic Studies, the Research Center and Consultancy in Information Technology, and the Consultancy Center in Pharmaceutical Services.

From its founding, Ahram Canadian University has sought partnerships with Canadian institutions for administrative cooperation and co-accreditation.

== Faculties ==
- Faculty of Pharmacy
- Faculty of Dentistry
- Faculty of Physical Therapy
- Faculty of Computer Science and Information Technology
- Faculty of Design and Creative Arts
- Faculty of Mass Communication
- School of Business Administration
- Faculty of Languages and Translation
- Faculty of Engineering

== See also ==
- Université Française d'Égypte
- American University in Cairo
- British University in Egypt
- List of Egyptian universities
