= Ghana Youth Environmental Movement =

Environmental Group

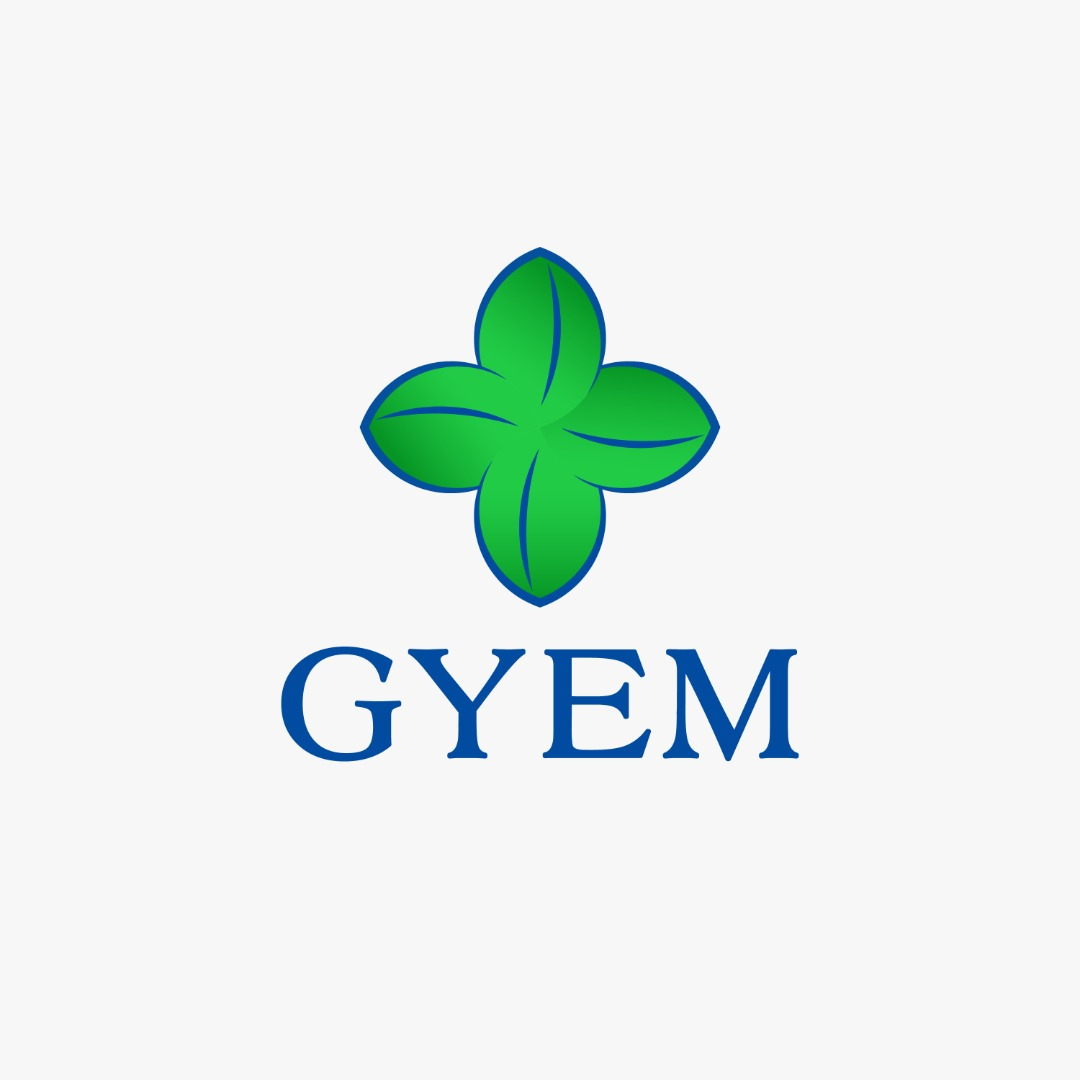
- Formation: 2012
- Location: Ghana

Ghana Youth Environmental Movement (GYEM), is a national youth-led environmental group in Ghana established in 2012, by a group of young activists led by Gideon Commey, that empowers young people to engage in a sustainable environment and address climate issues through advocacy campaigns and community activities.

Between 2018 and 2019, GYEM initiated Power Shift, a summit that convenes young people to discuss pressing issues related to waste management, sanitation, plastic pollution, climate change and renewable energy. GYEM played a role in the campaign against the introduction of coal-fired power plants into Ghana and also led an anti-coal campaign in 2016.

== Initiatives ==
In October 2020, GYEM set up a water kiosk project titled Kyensu Kiosk. The goal was to provide a low-income community in the Ga West Municipal District with portable drinking water. This community has had challenges in accessing clean drinking water.

== Campaigns ==
In 2018, the movement held the Power Shift Environmental Summit to mark World Environment Day 2018 in Accra. The event convened young people and stakeholders to initiate discussions and take action on plastic pollution issues in Ghana. In March 2019, the group led youth groups and civil society organizations in a campaign to demand African governments to take action against climate change.
