= October (magazine) =

Egyptian weekly political magazine

- Former editors: Anis Mansour, Ragab Elbanna, Ismail Montassar, Hassan Abu Taleb
- Categories: Political magazine
- Frequency: Weekly
- Publisher: Dar Al Maarif
- Founded: 1976; 50 years ago
- First issue: 31 October 1976
- Company: Dar Al Maarif
- Country: Egypt
- Based in: Cairo
- Language: Arabic
- Website: October
- ISSN: 1110-8983

October (Arabic: اكتوبر) is a political magazine published in Cairo, Egypt. It is one of the state-owned publications in the country.

== History and profile ==
October was established by Dar Al Maarif group in 1976. The first issue appeared on 31 October that year. It is a political and social magazine published by Dar Al Maarif group weekly on Saturdays. The company is owned by the Egyptian government and is based in Cairo.

Anis Mansour, an Egyptian writer, was the first editor-in-chief of the magazine who held the post for a long period. Ragab Elbanna (between 1994-2005) and Ismail Montassar have also served as editor-in-chief of the weekly. On 28 June 2014, Hassan Abu Taleb became the editor-in-chief of October. In September 2020, Muhammad Amin Ali Al Sayed was named as the editor-in-chief.

During the editorship of Anis Mansour, the magazine published articles by Israeli writers between 1979 and 1981.

October sold 120,000 copies in 2000.

== See also ==
- List of magazines in Egypt
