= Green Africa Youth Organization =

Ghanaian youth-led advocacy group

Green Africa Youth Organization (GAYO)
- Formation: 2014
- Founder: Joshua Amponsem and Desmond Alugnoa
- Headquarters: Ghana
- Location: Ghana, West Africa
- Website: https://greenafricayouth.com/

Green Africa Youth Organization (GAYO) is a youth-led advocacy group based in Ghana. It was founded in 2014 by Joshua Amponsem and Desmond Alugnoa. The group focuses on environmental sustainability and community improvement. GAYO aims is to inspire young people to participate in climate activism and foster climate leadership in Ghana. GAYO also provides environmental blogs. GAYO established the first Youth Climate Council in Africa to provide climate skills to young people when it launched the council in 2021 in Ghana.

== Founders ==
Joshua Amponsem is a Ghanaian climate activist and the Climate Lead at the UN Secretary General’s Youth Envoy office. Since a young age, he has been assisting climate-affected communities in Ghana. Being an advisor to the UN Youth Envoy’s office, he facilitated the first UN Youth Climate Summit. Joshua was one of the speakers at the World Economic Forum’s Annual Meeting in Davos in 2022.

Desmond Alugnoa was a farmer in northern Ghana. His work started in 2012 with an emphasis on environmental preservation, climate adaptation, and community development.

== Projects and Initiatives ==
=== Sustainable Community Project ===
GAYO’s sustainable community project is a community-based waste management project in the South district of Ghana. The project includes members-led activities such as composting, recycling arts, and producing charcoal briquettes from agricultural waste.

The project aims to create a zero-waste model for African rural-urban areas.

The project has achieved significant results within the short period of its initiation. The project also procured safe water to over 100 women within the Kandiga-Kurugu rural population.

=== Zero Waste Strategy ===
GAYO has been working with La Dade Kotopon Municipal Assembly (LaDMA) to implement Zero Waste Accra Project to promote zero waste practices across municipalities.

=== Sustainable Sanitary Products & Period Poverty ===
GAYO partnered with PeriodLink for the menstrual justice movement. Both youth-supported organizations raised funds to train women in Northern Ghana to build better careers. The project educated teachers and pupils on menstrual health and period poverty across the upper-east region of northern Ghana.

=== Campus Eco Clubs ===
GAYO initiated campus echo clubs in Ghanaian universities to educate youth on environmental problems. Some of the participating universities were the University of Cape Coast (UCC), the University of Ghana (LEGON), the University of Developmental Studies (UDS), and Kwame Nkrumah University of Science and Technology (KNUST). The GAYO eco clubs called for drastic action on plastic waste as a part of the Zero Waste Strategy.
