= Al Ahram Al Arabi =

Weekly political magazine in Egypt

- Editor-in-chief: Khaled Tawheed
- Categories: Political magazine
- Frequency: Weekly
- Publisher: Dar Al Ahram publishing house
- Founded: 1997; 29 years ago
- Country: Egypt
- Based in: Cairo
- Language: Arabic
- Website: Al Ahram Al Arabi
- ISSN: 1110-9246
- OCLC: 865565834

Al Ahram Al Arabi (Arabic: الأهرام العربى, romanized: al-Ahrām al-ʻArabī) is a political weekly magazine published in Cairo, Egypt. The publishing house of the magazine also owns Al Ahram and Al Ahram Weekly, two of the biggest media outlets in the country.

== History and profile ==
The magazine was launched in 1997. It is published by the Dar Al Ahram publishing house, being one of its 19 publications.

As of 2005 Mamdouh Al Wali was the board chairman of the weekly which is headquartered in Cairo. Usama Saraya is one of the former editors-in-chief of the magazine. He held the post until July 2005. Ashraf Badr Mahdy was appointed editor-in-chief of the magazine in August 2012. Khaled Tawheed became the editor-in-chief in June 2014.

Unlike Al Ahram, Al Ahram Al Arabi has a critical stance in regard to the policies of the Egyptian government. In addition, the magazine has anti-Israel and religious views. The weekly, despite being a political weekly, awards leading Arab sports figures and sports media.

== Content ==
In the immediate aftermath of the 9/11 attacks Al Ahram Al Arabi argued on 4 October 2001 that the U.S. was experiencing the results of its own acts. It further stated that with the collapse of "the city of globalization (New York City) the theory of globalization will be buried." In March 2013, the magazine alleged that three Hamas military leaders were responsible for the murder of the Egyptian soldiers in Rafah in August 2012. The allegation was based on the report of an Egyptian General Intelligence member.

== Bans ==
Al Ahram Al Arabi was banned by the Sudanese authorities in September 2012 due to the report about the migration of Sudanese citizens to Libya, Israel and other countries.

== See also ==
- List of magazines in Egypt
