= Al-Ahram Weekly =

English newspaper based in Cairo, Egypt

- Categories: Nasserism, anti-reform
- Frequency: Weekly
- Format: Broadsheet
- Publisher: Al-Ahram Publishing House
- Founded: 1991; 35 years ago
- Country: Egypt
- Based in: Cairo
- Website: english.ahram.org.eg

Al-Ahram Weekly is an English-language weekly broadsheet printed by the Al-Ahram Publishing House in Cairo, Egypt.

== History and profile ==
Al Ahram Weekly was established in 1991 by the Al-Ahram newspaper, which also runs a French-language weekly version, Al-Ahram Hebdo.

Between 1991 and 2003, founder Hosni Guindi, served as the editor-in-chief and Hani Shukrallah as managing editor and co-founder Mona Anis as deputy editor-in-chief. After Hosni's death in 2003, Shukrallah succeeded him as acting editor. In 2005 Egypt's Shura Council appointed Assem El-Qersh as the paper's editor-in-chief, replacing Shukrallah. In June 2014, Galal Nassar was appointed editor-in-chief of the weekly.

The circulation of the magazine in 2000 was 50,000 copies.

== See also ==
- List of magazines in Egypt
- Sherif Sonbol, Al Ahram Weekly chief photographer
