= Al-Ahram =

Egyptian daily newspaper

Al-Ahram الأهرام

- Typical Al-Ahram front page
- Type: Daily newspaper
- Format: Broadsheet
- Owner: Egyptian Government
- Founder(s): Beshara Takla; Saleem Takla
- Publisher: Al-Ahram Publishing House
- Editor: Mohamed Abdelhady Allam
- Founded: 5 August 1876; 150 years ago
- Political alignment: Uncertain (2011–present); National Democratic Party (1978–2011)
- Language: Arabic, English
- Headquarters: Boulaq, Cairo, Egypt
- Country: Egypt
- Circulation: 1,000,000 daily 1,200,000 Fridays
- Website: Arabic: gate.ahram.org.eg English: english.ahram.org.eg Français: french.ahram.org.eg

Al-Ahram (Arabic: الأهرام, lit. 'The Pyramids'), founded on 5 August 1876, is the most widely circulating Egyptian daily newspaper, and the second-oldest after Al-Waqa'i' al-Misriyya (The Egyptian Events, founded 1828). It is majority owned by the Egyptian government, and is considered a newspaper of record for Egypt.

Given the many varieties of Arabic language, Al-Ahram is widely considered an influential source of writing style in Arabic. In 1950, the Middle East Institute described Al-Ahram as being to the Arabic-reading public within its area of distribution, "What The Times is to Englishmen and The New York Times to Americans"; however, it has often been accused of heavy influence and censorship by the Egyptian government.

In addition to the main edition published in Egypt, the paper publishes two other Arabic-language editions, one geared to the Arab world and the other aimed at an international audience, as well as editions in English and French.

== History ==
Al-Ahram was founded in Alexandria in 1876 by two Lebanese Melkite Christian brothers, Beshara Takla and Saleem Takla. It began as a weekly newspaper published every Saturday. Its first issue appeared on 5 August 1876. The paper was relaunched as a daily newspaper in January 1881.

Its headquarters was in Alexandria until November 1899 when it was moved to Cairo. Initially the Cairo and Alexandria editions remained separate but later there became only one out of the new headquarters. The newspaper was distributed in Egypt and the Levant. The religious innovators Muhammad Abduh and Jamal al-Din al-Afghani were early writers of the newspaper. Upon the death of Beshara Takla, Daud Barakat, a Lebanese journalist, was named editor of the daily in 1901. In the early 1920s Muhib Al Din Al Khatib, a Syrian journalist, served as the editor of the paper.

=== Under Heikal ===
President Gamal Abdel Nasser made his friend Mohamed Hassanein Heikal editor-in-chief of al-Ahram in 1957, and the paper gained semi-official status. On 24 May 1960, it was nationalized when Nasser passed a law eliminating the ownership of private newspapers. Under Nasser, al-Ahram became an internationally respected paper. It moved to a new headquarters in Bulaq in the 1960s.

Heikal was known for high standard of production quality and contacted Linotype in 1965 seeking to acquire state-of-the-art Elektron linecastes.

The circulation of the paper was between 45,000 and 50,000 copies in 1937 whereas it was 90,000 copies in 1947. In 1976 the paper had a circulation of 520,000 copies, making it the second-most read daily in Egypt after Al Akhbar. Al Ahram's circulation in 2000 was 1.2 million copies.

== Profile and editions ==
Al-Ahram daily is the flagship of what is now the Al-Ahram publishing house, the largest in Egypt. Al-Ahram's headquarters is in Boulaq, Cairo. Its content was controlled by the Egyptian Ministry of Information.

The pan-Arab Arabic-language edition of the paper, called Al Ahram Al Arabiya, is destined for readers in the Arab World and the Egyptian expatriates in Arab countries. It is published daily in Bahrain, Saudi Arabia, Kuwait, UAE and distributed in Egypt and Arab states of the Persian Gulf. Arabic weekly, Al Ahram Al Arabi, which was launched in 1997 is another publication of the publishing house.

An international Arabic-language edition called Al Ahram al Duwali has been published daily in London since 1984. It is printed in both London and Paris and is distributed throughout Europe, USA, Canada and Egypt.

Two foreign-language weekly versions are also produced: the English Al-Ahram Weekly (founded in 1991) and the French Al-Ahram Hebdo.

Al-Ahram produces a continually updated news website in the English language at english.ahram.org.e.g., called Ahram Online. It also has an Arabic news website which was the 20th mostly visited website for 2010 in the MENA region. It was named as the most popular news portal in the Arab world in the period from 31 August 2011 to 31 August 2012 by Forbes Middle East.

== Ownership and government influence ==
Al-Ahram is owned by the Al-Ahram Foundation which is managed by the Egyptian government's "Supreme Council of Press". Al-Ahram is one of the largest circulating newspapers in the world. Long-term editor of the daily Mohammad Hassanein Haykal was the confidant of Nasser and also, the semi-official voice of the Egyptian government when he was in office.

The Egyptian government owns a controlling share of the stocks of the paper and appoints the editors. As appointees of the state, little censorship is exercised over them; it is understood that they are loyal to the state. Under President Hosni Mubarak, Al-Ahram largely ignored, and trivialised the opposition parties to Mubarak's ruling National Democratic Party, and did not publish much direct criticism of the government.

The Anti-Defamation League, in a review of Arab newspapers in 2005, stated that Al-Ahram "is given substantial leeway" by the government so long as they avoid "certain 'taboos'." Reporters Without Borders, in their 2005 report on press freedom in Egypt, reported that editorials in many newspapers, including Al-Ahram, had become increasingly critical of the National Democratic Party's control of the government, and the corruption of the Mubarak regime. In an interview with Reporters Without Borders, Abdel Halim Qandil, editor of the weekly magazine Al-Arabi, said that the government interfered with independent operation of Al-Ahram by controlling the printing presses and appointing the editors.

Al-Ahram generated controversy in September 2010 when an Egyptian blogger, Wael Khalil, revealed that the newspaper had altered a photo of Middle East leaders walking with United States president Barack Obama so that instead of Obama leading the group, Egyptian president Mubarak was placed in the front when he was actually walking in the rearmost position. Osama Saraya, Al-Ahram's editor-in-chief, defended the altered photo, stating that it was meant to underscore Egypt's leading role in the peace process: "The expressionist photo is... a brief, live and true expression of the prominent stance of President Mubarak in the Palestinian issue, his unique role in leading it before Washington or any other."

Following the 2011 political transition, Al-Ahram experienced shifts in editorial leadership and governance while maintaining its status as a state-backed institution. In the years following, the organization adapted to changing media consumption habits by expanding its digital publishing efforts and shifting components of its traditional print infrastructure online.

== Notable writers and editors ==
Mohamed Hassanein Heikal was the long-term editor-in-chief of Al Ahram. He served in the post between August 1957 and 1974. Ali Amin served as editor-in-chief between 1974 and 1976. From 1978 to July 2006 Ibrahim Nafie was the editor-in-chief of Al Ahram. He also served as the chairman of the daily until 2005. Nafie was replaced by Osama Saraya as editor-in-chief in July 2005. In August 2012, Abdel Nasser Salama was appointed editor-in-chief of the paper by the Egyptian Shura Council. in May 2017 Alaa Thabet became the editor-in-chief of the paper.

Notable writers include:

- Fekry Abaza
- Shahid Alam
- Khalid Amayreh
- Azmi Bishara
- Hamid Dabashi
- Ragab Elbanna
- Sabah Hamamou
- Mohamed Hassanein Heikal served as editor-in-chief
- Taha Hussein
- Yusuf Idris
- Naguib Mahfouz (1911–2006), awarded the 1988 Nobel Prize in Literature
- Anis Mansour
- Joseph Massad
- Salama Moussa
- Ihsan Abdel Quddous
- Edward Said
- Ahdaf Soueif

== Bibliography ==
- Merrill, John C. and Harold A. Fisher. The world's great dailies: profiles of fifty newspapers (1980) pp 51–58
- Islam, Roumeen (2002). The right to tell: the role of mass media in economic development (Illustrated ed.). World Bank Publications. ISBN 978-0-8213-5203-8.
- The Middle East journal, Volume 4. Washington, D.C.: Middle East Institute. 1950.
- Drost, Harry (1991). The World's news media: a comprehensive reference guide. Longman.
