= List of Emirati writers =

This is a list of United Arab Emirates writers, including novelists, short story writers, poets, essayists, thought leaders, and journalists.

- Dubai Abulhoul Alfalasi
- Sultan Al Ameemi
- Afra Atiq
- Nasser Al-Dhaheri
- Salha Ghabish
- Shaikha Al-Jabri
- Sara al-Jarwan
- Suad Jawad
- Adel Khozam
- Kulthum bin Masoud
- Khulood Al-Mualla
- Hessa Al Muhairi
- Shaykha al-Nakhi
- Nadia Al Najjar
- Noura al Noman
- Muhammad Obaid
- Salha Obeid
- Sultan Sooud Al-Qassemi
- Maryam Saqer Al Qasimi
- Maisoon Saqer
- Habib Al Sayegh
- Qais Sedki
- Ali AlShaali
- Alia Al Shamsi author, poet, curator and photographer
- Mona Al-Tamimi
- Eman Al Yousuf
- Basimah Yunus
- Maryam Alzoaby

== See also ==
- "Poetry in the UAE", Shihab Ghanem, United Arab Emirates: a new perspective (2001)
