= Mehmet Hakkı Suçin =

Turkish academic, Arabist and literary translator (born 1970)

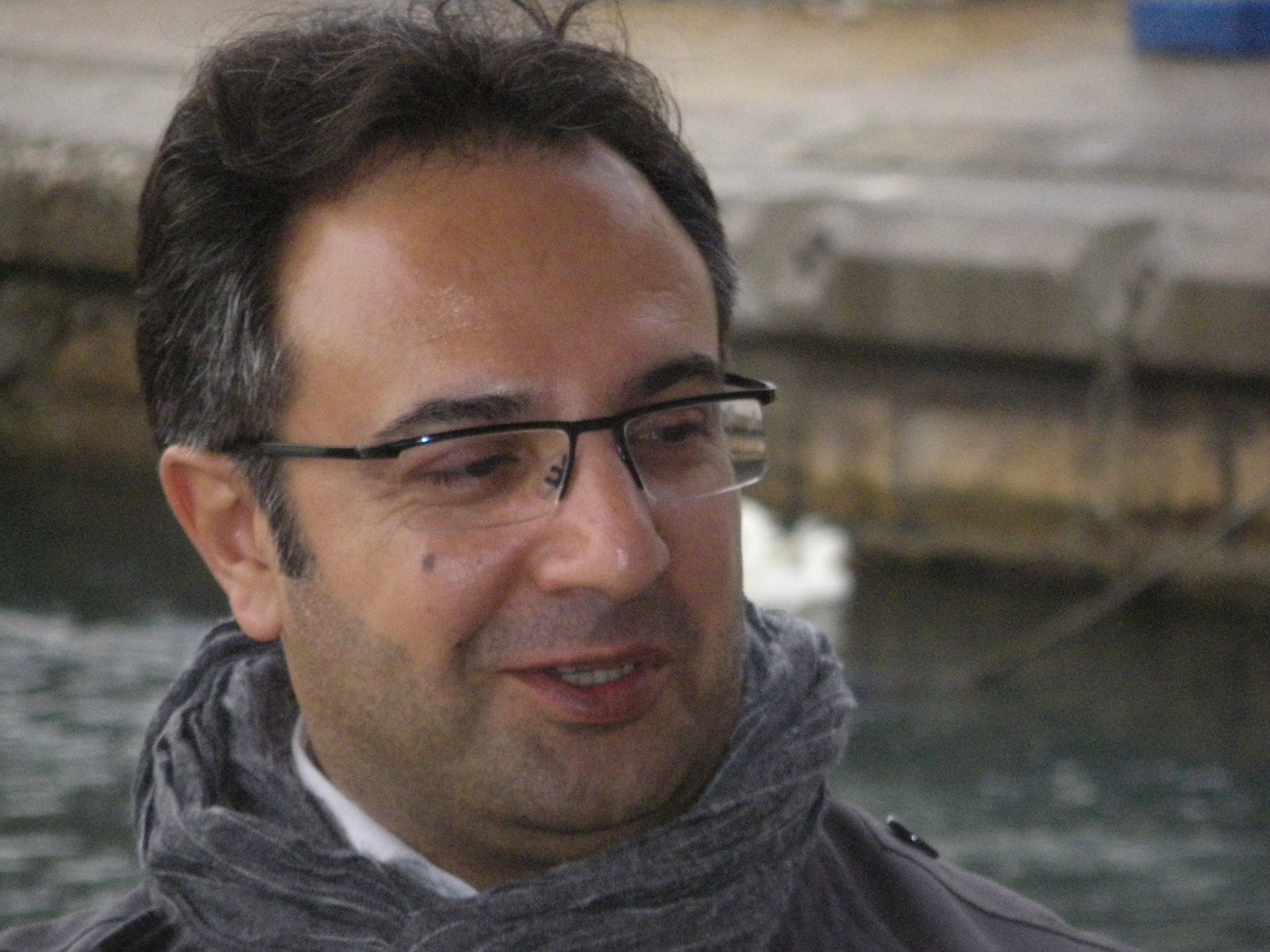
- Born: 1970 (age 55–56); Tuzluca, Turkey
- Occupations: Academic; literary translator; Arabist
- Writing career
- Notable awards: Sharjah Translation Award "Turjuman" (2024) Achievement Award, Sheikh Hamad Award for Translation (2022) Translation Award, Turkish Writers' Union (2016)
- Website: mehmethakkisucin.com

Mehmet Hakkı Suçin (born 1970) is a Turkish author, Arabist, academic, and literary translator known for his translations of classical and modern Arabic literature into Turkish. He is a professor at Gazi University and has worked in Arabic literature, translation studies, literary translation, and the teaching of Arabic as a foreign language. He is particularly known for his Turkish translations of poets and writers such as Mu'allaqat poets, Ibn Hazm, Ibn Tufayl, Al-Mutanabbi, Kahlil Gibran, Adonis, Mahmoud Darwish, Nizar Qabbani, Naguib Mahfouz, Ghassan Kanafani, Adania Shibli, and Najwan Darwish.

Suçin received the Sharjah Translation Award 'Turjuman' in 2024 for his Turkish translation of Ibn Hazm’s The Ring of the Dove (Güvercin Gerdanlığı). He also received the Achievement Award of the Sheikh Hamad Award for Translation and International Understanding in 2022.

== Early life and education ==
Suçin graduated from the Department of Arabic Language and Literature at Ankara University in 1993. He completed his MA and PhD studies at Gazi University. His MA thesis examined the short stories of the Egyptian writer Yahya Haqqi, while his doctoral dissertation focused on theoretical and applied approaches to translation between Arabic and Turkish.

== Academic career ==
Suçin has taught at Gazi University in Ankara since the late 1990s and became a full professor in 2017. His academic work focuses on literary translation, Arabic literature, intercultural literary transmission, and Arabic language teaching.

In 2006, he worked as a visiting scholar at the Centre for Translation and Intercultural Studies at the University of Manchester.

In the early 2010s, Suçin chaired a commission that prepared one of Turkey's earliest CEFR-based Arabic language curricula for primary and secondary education. This work was later cited in connection with a similar Arabic curriculum initiative in European Union countries.

He served as a jury member for the International Prize for Arabic Fiction in 2014. He has also been involved in the evaluation and advisory work of the Sheikh Hamad Award for Translation and International Understanding. He is a member of the Scientific Committee of the Sheikh Zayed Book Award.

Suçin has conducted literary translation workshops in Turkey and abroad, including Arabic–Turkish literary translation workshops and poetry translation workshops.

Much of his academic and literary work concerns the translation and reception of classical and modern Arabic poetry in Turkish.

== Translation approach and poeticity ==
Suçin has written on the concept of poeticity (Turkish: şiiriyet) in poetry translation, proposing it as an umbrella term for the aesthetic, emotional, rhythmic, and contextual dimensions involved in transferring poetry between languages. In his 2025 article "Strategic Choices and 'Poeticity' in Poetry Translation", published in the Istanbul Journal of Arabic Studies, he discussed poeticity through dimensions including content balance, time–place–tradition, sentiment and harmony, communicative value, poetic sensibility, and linguistic–aesthetic balance. The study examined translations of Shakespeare's Sonnet 66 and the Mu‘allaqa of Imru' al-Qays.

The concept has also been discussed in later academic work on artificial intelligence, literary aesthetics, and poetry translation. Gürkan Dağbaşı and Murat Özcan examined the relationship between artificial intelligence and poeticity in literary translation in a 2025 edited volume on artificial intelligence-supported Arabic translation, education, and literary studies.

A 2025 peer-reviewed article by İbrahim Ethem Polat and Ahmet Tutuk examined Suçin's Turkish translations of al-Mutanabbī's poems within the framework of poeticity, focusing on the aesthetic and rhythmic elements of poetic translation.

In an interview with ArabLit, Suçin emphasized the importance of preserving poetic voice, rhythm, and emotional intensity in translation.

== Literary translation and reception ==
Suçin’s translations span both classical and modern Arabic literature. He has translated works by pre-Islamic poets of the Mu‘allaqat, Ibn Tufail, Ibn Hazm, al-Mutanabbī, Mahmoud Darwish, Adonis, Nizar Qabbani, Mohammed Bennis, Ghassan Kanafani, Naguib Mahfouz, Adania Shibli, and Kahlil Gibran, among others.

Arab literary coverage has discussed his role in introducing classical and modern Arabic poets to Turkish readers. Writing in Al-Modon, Bashir al-Bakr described him as a translator who helped introduce major modern Arabic poets such as Nizar Qabbani, Mahmoud Darwish, and Adonis to Turkish readers.

His Turkish translation of Ibn Hazm’s The Ring of the Dove received the Sharjah Translation Award "Turjuman" in 2024. Reports published during the Sharjah International Book Fair described the award as recognition of the translation’s contribution to intercultural literary exchange and the dissemination of Arabic literary heritage in Turkish.

His translation of The Mu‘allaqat (Yedi Askı Şiirleri) was included in Hürriyet Kitap Sanat's selection of the best literary books of 2020. Algerian writer and culture editor Muhammad Allawa Haji described the work as the first poetic translation of the seven pre-Islamic odes known as the Mu‘allaqat into Turkish, published with the Arabic text facing the Turkish translation.

Suçin’s Turkish translations of Arabic poetry have been discussed in literary reviews and cultural criticism in both Turkey and the Arab world. A review by Suat Baran described the translations as an important contribution to the reception of Arabic literature in Turkish and emphasized their attempt to preserve the musicality and poetic intensity of the original texts.

Lebanese poet and critic Abdo Wazen referred to Suçin’s translations of al-Mutanabbī as an attempt to convey the poet’s emotional universe and poetic sensibility to Turkish readers.

A 2025 book review by Esat Ayyıldız characterized Suçin’s al-Mutanabbī translation as preserving the semantic framework of the source poems while offering a poetic and aesthetic experience in Turkish.

== Awards ==
Year	Award	Awarding body	Work / reason	Source
2024	The Sharjah Translation Award "Turjuman"	Sharjah Book Authority	Turkish translation of Ibn Hazm's The Ring of the Dove (Güvercin Gerdanlığı)	
2022	Achievement Award	Sheikh Hamad Award for Translation and International Understanding	Overall contribution to translation	
2021	Best Translated Book Award	Dünya Kitap	Turkish translation of Adania Shibli's Minor Detail (Küçük Bir Ayrıntı)	
2016	Translation Award	Turkish Writers' Union	Turkish translation of Nizar Qabbani's The Book of Love (Aşkın Kitabı)	
2010	International Scientific Publication Incentive Award	Scientific and Technological Research Council of Turkey (TÜBİTAK)	Article: “Turkish and Arabic Reduplications in Contrast”, published in Australian Journal of Linguistics	

== Works ==
Some of his major publications include:

=== Books ===
- Öteki Dilde Var Olmak: Arapça Çeviriye Yaklaşımlar [Being in the Other Language: Approaches to Arabic Translation]. Istanbul: Say Yayınları, 2013.
- Dünden Bugüne Arapçaya Çevirinin Serüveni [The Journey of Translation into Arabic from Past to Present]. Ankara: Kurgan Edebiyat, 2012.
- Haber Çevirisi: Türkçe-Arapça / Arapça-Türkçe [News Translation: Turkish–Arabic / Arabic–Turkish]. İstanbul: Opus Yayınları, 2014.
- Aktif Arapça [Active Arabic]. Ankara: Engin Yayınevi, 2008.

=== Articles and book chapters ===
- “Şiir Çevirisinde Stratejik Seçimler ve ‘Şiiriyet’: Shakespeare ve İmru’ul-Kays Çevirilerinin Değerlendirilmesi” [“Strategic Choices and ‘Poeticity’ in Poetry Translation: An Evaluation of Shakespeare and Imru’ al-Qays Translations”]. Istanbul Journal of Arabic Studies 8, no. 1 (2025): 95–136.
- “İttijāhāt al-Shi‘r al-Turkī min al-Dīwān ilā ‘Aṣr al-Intarnat” [“From the Divan to the Digital: A Look at Turkey’s Rich Tradition of Poetry”]. Al Majalla, 2024.
- “The Influence of Nâzım Hikmet on Arab Poetry”. In Turkish Literature as World Literature, edited by Burcu Alkan and Çimen Günay-Erkol. New York: Bloomsbury Academic, 2021.
- “Turkish and Arabic Reduplications in Contrast”. Australian Journal of Linguistics 30, no. 2 (2010): 209–226.

== Translations ==
Suçin translated works from both classical and modern Arabic literature, including poetry, fiction, intellectual texts, and anthologies.

=== Poetry translations and anthologies ===
- Su Gibi Sade Kurşun Gibi Kesin – Seçilmiş Şiirler (Simple as Water, Clear as a Bullet: Selected Poems), by Riyad Al-Saleh Al-Hussein (2026).
- Ermiş (The Prophet), by Kahlil Gibran (2016; new translation published in 2026).
- İnsanın Şarkısı – Seçilmiş Şiirler (The Song of Man: Selected Poems), by Al-Mutanabbi (2024).
- Kudüs'ün Kapısında Kelimeler – Seçilmiş Şiirler (Words at the Gate of Jerusalem: Selected Poems), by Najwan Darwish (2023).
- Yedi Askı Şiirleri (Muallakalar) (The Seven Mu‘allaqat, 2020).
- Badem Çiçekleri Gibi yahut Daha Ötesi (Like Almond Blossoms or Beyond), by Mahmoud Darwish (2020).
- İşte Budur Benim Adım (This Is My Name), by Adonis (2020).
- Midilli'ye Açılan Tekne (A Boat to Lesbos), by Nouri al-Jarrah (2019).
- İçimden Göçenler – Seçilmiş Şiirler (Those Who Migrated Out of Me: Selected Poems), by Malak Mustafa (2019).
- Aşkın Kitabı (The Book of Love), by Nizar Qabbani (2017).
- Belli Belirsiz Şeyler Anısına (In Celebration of Vague-Clear Things), by Adonis (2017).
- Atı Neden Yalnız Bıraktın (Why Did You Leave the Horse Alone?), by Mahmoud Darwish (2017).
- Bu Şiirin Bitmesini İstemiyorum (I Don’t Want This Poem to End), by Mahmoud Darwish (2016).
- Mural (Mural), by Mahmoud Darwish (2015).
- Maddenin Haritalarında İlerleyen Şehvet (Desire Moving Through Maps of Matter), by Adonis (2015).
- Aşkın Kitabı (The Book of Love), by Mohammed Bennis (2015).
- Gülün Gölgesi Yok (No Shadow for the Rose: Selected Poems), by Khulood Al-Mualla (2014).
- Benim Adıma Bir Gökyüzü (A Sky in My Name), by Ahmad Al-Shahawy (2014).

=== Fiction and narrative translations ===
- Mumyanın Uyanışı – Antik Mısır Hikâyeleri (The Awakening of the Mummy: Ancient Egyptian Stories), by Naguib Mahfouz (2024).
- Güneşteki Adamlar (Men in the Sun), by Ghassan Kanafani (2023).
- Hayy bin Yakzan (Hayy ibn Yaqdhan), by Ibn Tufail (2021).
- Küçük Bir Ayrıntı (Minor Detail), by Adania Shibli (2021).
- Güvercin Gerdanlığı (The Ring of the Dove), by Ibn Hazm (2018).
- Umm Hâşim’in Lambası (The Lamp of Umm Hashim), by Yahya Haqqi (1998).

=== Intellectual, religious and classical texts ===
- Putlar Kitabı (The Book of Idols), by Hisham ibn al-Kalbi (2023).
- Kitap, Hitap, Hakikat (The Book, the Discourse, the Truth), by Adonis (2022).
- Şiir Şiir Ayetler – Amme Cüzü Çevirisi (Verses as Poetry: A Translation of Juz' Amma, 2015).
- Arap-İslam Kültüründe Yenilikçi Yaklaşımlar (Renewal in Arabic-Islamic Culture), by Amin al-Khuli, co-translated with Emrullah İşler (2006).

=== Turkish language and literature in Arabic translation ===
- Mukhtārāt min Shiʿr Yunus Emre (Selected Poems), by Yunus Emre (2022).
- Mukhtārāt min Dīwān al-Ḥikmah (Selected Poems from the Diwan of Wisdom), by Ahmad Yasawi (2017).
- Alfiyya min al-Adab al-Turkī: Tārīkh Mūjaz (A Millennium of Turkish Literature: A Concise History), by Talat Sait Halman (2014).
- Qawāʿid al-Lugha al-Turkiyya li Ghayr al-Nāṭiqīn Bihā (Turkish Grammar for Arabic Speakers), adapted from Mehmet Hengirmen (2003).
