= Salha =

Salha is an Arabic term that may refer to:

== People ==
=== As a given name ===
- Salha "Mama" Bobo (1907–2001), American businesswoman
- Salha Ghabish, Emirati writer
- Salha Hamadin, Palestinian writer
- Salha Obeid (born 1988), Emirati writer and novelist
- Princess Salha bint Asem of Jordan (born 1987)

=== As a surname ===
- Moner Mohammad Abu Salha (1991–2014), American militant
- Raife Salha (died 1968), Lebanese fashion designer
- Syntia Salha (born 2003), Lebanese footballer

=== Other ===
- Batilda Salha Burian (born 1965), Tanzanian politician

== Places ==
- An alternative transliteration of Saliha, a depopulated Palestinian Arab village
