= Manal bin Amr =

- Born: Manal Ali bin Amr; 1978 (age 47–48)
- Citizenship: United Arab Emirates
- Education: United Arab Emirates University; Sorbonne University Abu Dhabi
- Occupations: Writer, photographer, director, producer

Manal Ali bin Amr (Arabic: منال علي بن عمرو; born 1978) is an Emirati writer, photographer, Film director, and film producer.

== Education and career ==
Bin Amr was born in Abu Dhabi in 1978. She earned a Bachelor's degree in Mass Communication from the United Arab Emirates University in 2000 and later obtained a Master's degree in Marketing, Communication, and Media from Sorbonne University Abu Dhabi in 2018. Professionally, she worked as an editor at the Emirati publication Al-Mar'a Al-Youm from 2008 to 2012. A pioneer in the UAE's cinematic scene, she began her career by directing several short films, including The Shoe (2006), Stuck Face (2007), From the Agenda of Treason (2008), Borrowed (2009), Widad (2009), Noura's Apple (2010), and Things (2011). She gained widespread acclaim for her bold 2015 series The Smell of Bread, which tackled sensitive social issues.

Bin Amr also enjoys photography, graphic design, and printmaking.

== Awards ==
- Dubai International Film Festival Award for Best Local Cinematic Talent for Stuck Face, 2007.
- Best Theatre Direction Award at the Youth Theatre Festival for the play Portia in 2007. She also participated in the play From Where to Where at the same festival in 2008.
- Best Promising Emirati Female Director Award from the Dubai International Film Festival, 2009.
- First place in the Portrait category at the 3rd European Exhibition of Arab Photographers in Germany, 2006.

== Books ==
- Away from the Hands of Prostitutes: Prose Texts, 2012.
- We say a lot in a joke, Athar Publishing and Distribution House, 2013. ISBN 9782844096661
- Something Black, Jumeirah Publishing and Distribution, 2015. ISBN 9789948182504

== See also ==
- Basimah Yunus
- Eman Al Yousuf
- Nadia Al Najjar
