= Shaikha Al-Jabri =

- شيخة الجابري
- Born: Shaikha Mohammed Saeed Salem Al-Jabri
- Citizenship: United Arab Emirates
- Education: United Arab Emirates University
- Occupations: Writer, poet, researcher
- Writing career
- Language: Arabic

Shaikha Mohammad Al-Jabri (Arabic: شيخة محمد الجابري) is an Emirati poet, media personality, researcher, and writer.

== Education and career ==
Al-Jabri was born and raised in Al Ain, where she completed most of her schooling. She earned a Bachelor's degree in Media and Arabic Language from the United Arab Emirates University in 1988.

She worked as a research associate at the Zayed Centre for Heritage and History in Al Ain, later joining the Ministry of Culture, Youth, and Community Development and subsequently serving as a senior researcher in the Intangible Heritage Department at the Abu Dhabi Authority for Culture & Heritage.

Al-Jabri has published numerous works in poetry and heritage and has received professional and cultural awards. In 2012, she was awarded the Gulf Cooperation Council Medal for Cultural Leadership in Poetry. In 2014, she received the Taryam and Abdullah Omran Journalism Award for her column writing.

She began her literary career with classical poetry, essays, and short stories before focusing on popular literature. Her published collections include Maybe, For the Wind, Your voice flows through me, and On a Tone. In addition, she has compiled anthologies of poetry, such as Women on the Tends of Poetry (1999), which features selected poems by women in popular poetry. She has also participated in numerous poetry festivals and events.

Beyond literature, Al-Jabri has written and researched Emirati customs, traditions, and intangible heritage. Her first publication in this field was a folk narrative story belonging to the Emirati genre of kharareef, which she wrote during her university studies and published in Majid magazine. She has participated in several conferences on heritage studies, and her work includes A Guide to Fieldwork in Collecting Popular Heritage: Towards a Systematic Approach in the United Arab Emirates.

== Works ==
=== Heritage, poetry and literature ===
- Colors of My Heritage (Heritage)
- A Guide to Fieldwork in Collecting Folklore: Towards a Systematic Fieldwork in the United Arab Emirates (Heritage)
- Women's Adornment and Fashion in the United Arab Emirates: Body Adornment - The Philosophy of Beauty among Emirati Women (Heritage)
- For the Wind (Poetry)
- On a Tone (Literature)
- Partly Cloudy: Semi-Diary (Literature)
- Your voice flows through me (Poetry)
- Worries, Worries: No Shadow Resembles Me (Poetry)
- Night Talk (Literature)
- Descriptions in a Way: Poetic Texts I Read (Literature)
- Maybe (Literature)
- Another Passage (Literature)

=== Children's literature ===
- The Khaliji Cinderella
- Al-Badiha
- Umm Qurain
- The Riddle
- The Enchanted Pool
- The Fox and the Crow

== See also ==
- Basimah Yunus
- Fatma Abdullah
