= Turjuman Award =

International translation award in the United Arab Emirates

- Awarded for: Foreign-language translations of Arabic works
- Sponsored by: Sharjah Book Authority
- Location: Sharjah
- Country: United Arab Emirates
- Presented by: Sharjah Book Authority
- Reward: AED 1.4 million
- First award: 2017
- Website: sibf.com/en/awards/turjuman-award

The Turjuman Award, also known as the Sharjah Translation Award "Turjuman", is an international translation award presented by the Sharjah Book Authority in Sharjah, United Arab Emirates. The award is associated with the Sharjah International Book Fair and is given for foreign-language translations of works originally published in Arabic.

== History and purpose ==
The award was launched by the Sharjah Book Authority under the directives of Sultan bin Muhammad Al-Qasimi, ruler of Sharjah, as part of the cultural programme of the Sharjah International Book Fair. According to the organisers, the award aims to support the translation of Arabic and Arab-Islamic intellectual, cultural and creative works into other languages, and to encourage international publishers to make Arabic literature and thought available to wider readerships.

The award is open to Arab and international publishing houses that have published foreign-language translations of works originally issued in Arabic. Submissions are evaluated according to criteria including language quality, the significance of the subject, the added value of the translation, accuracy, terminological precision, and adherence to scholarly and linguistic standards.

== Award value ==
The total value of the Turjuman Award is AED 1.4 million. Of this amount, AED 100,000 is awarded to the translator of the winning work, while AED 1.3 million is allocated to the publishers. According to the award rules, 70 percent of the publishers' share goes to the foreign publishing house that holds the translation rights for the winning book, and 30 percent goes to the Arab publishing house that holds the rights to the original Arabic edition.

== Winners ==
Year	Winning publisher	Winning translator	Translated work	Original work	Language
2017	Editorial Verbum	Salvador Peña Martín	Las mil y una noches	One Thousand and One Nights	Spanish
2018	Actes Sud	Hala Kodmani	Du despotisme et autres textes	Ṭabāʾiʿ al-istibdād by Abd al-Rahman al-Kawakibi	French
2019	Edizioni E/O	Barbara Teresi	Una piccola morte	Mawt ṣaghīr by Mohammed Hasan Alwan	Italian
2021	Editora Tabla	Michel Sleiman	Onze Astros	Aḥada ʿashara kawkaban by Mahmoud Darwish	Portuguese
2022	Istituto per l'Oriente C. A. Nallino	Arturo Monaco	L'Introduzione alla traduzione araba dell'Iliade	Sulaymān al-Bustānī's introduction to his Arabic translation of Homer's Iliad	Italian
2023	Unionsverlag	Hartmut Fähndrich	Das Halsband der Tauben	Ṭawq al-ḥamām by Raja Alem	German
2024	Alfa Publishing	Mehmet Hakkı Suçin	Güvercin Gerdanlığı	Ṭawq al-ḥamāmah by Ibn Hazm	Turkish
2025	Academia Publishing House	Ondřej Beránek	Cesta z Baghdádu k volžským Bulharům: 921–922	Account of Ahmad ibn Fadlan	Czech

== See also ==
- Sharjah International Book Fair
- Sharjah Book Authority
- Literary translation
- Arabic literature
