= Lateefa Buti =

Emirati children writer

- Born: Kuwait
- Occupation: Writer
- Awards: Sheikh Zayed Book Award for Hatless, 2017

Lateefa Buti (Arabic: لطيفة بطي) is a Kuwaiti writer. She has published many books for children including Hatless, which won the Sheikh Zayed Book Award in 2017 in the children's literature category, and was translated into English by Nancy Roberts.

== Career ==
Lateefa Buti has published two short story collections including The Mermaid and My Country, Ininkayo. In 2003, she started writing books for children. Buti has contributed stories to the Kuwaiti magazine Al Arabi Al Sagheer including Salem and Salma and My City Kuwait. Also, she has written some cultural heritage stories and folklore for Al Jazeera Children's Channel and Al Baraem Channel. Buti won several awards, including the first place award for Children's Theater Writing Competition at the level of the State of Kuwait, the second place in the Children's Theater Writing Competition at the level of the Arab world which was held by the National Council for Culture, Arts, and Literature in Kuwait in 2013, and won the Sheikh Zayed Book Award for category of Children's Literature for her book Hatless in 2017. She is the founder of Dar al-Ruslan for publishing which is the first Kuwaiti publishing house for children's book.

== Works ==
=== Short story collections ===
- My Country, Ininkayo (original title: Baladi Inenkaio), 2001
- The Mermaid (original title: Aroos Al-Bahr)

=== Plays ===
- The Princess Salma (original title: al-Amira Salma)
- The Hunter Saleh (original title: al-Sayad Saleh)

=== Children's book ===
- Why Did the Young Foal Neighed? (original title: Limatha Sahalat Al Muhra Al Sageera?), 2010
- Miss Chicken (original title: Al Anesa Dajaja), 2016
- Khanfesa Tanesfna
- Nayel's Gloves
- Gregaan and the Kangaroo (original title: Greegaan wa al Kangar), 2017
- The Greyhound Puppy (original title: al-Garw sloogi), 2017
- Hatless (original title: Bela Qubaa), 2017
- Children and Rainbow Colors (original title: al-Atfal wa Qaous Qusah), 2017
- The Black Smile in the White City (original title: al-Ibtisama al-baidaa fi al-madina al-sawdaa), 2017

== See also ==
- Salha Obeid
- Nadia Al Najjar
- Hessa Al Muhairi
- Maryam Saqer Al Qasimi
