= Al-Ghais =

al-Ghais (Arabic: الغيص) is an Arabic surname. Notable people with the surname include:

- Aisha al-Ghais (fl. 2008), Emirati poet
- Haitham al-Ghais (born 1969), Kuwaiti oil executive and diplomat
