= Fatma Abdullah =

- Born: 1975 (age 50–51); Ras Al Khaimah, United Arab Emirates
- Occupations: Writer, film director

Fatma Abdullah (Arabic: فاطمة عبد الله) is an Emirati writer and film director.

== Biography ==
Fatma Ali was born in 1975, in Ras Al Khaimah, UAE. She studied business administration and worked in banking before joining Dubai Customs. She subsequently worked at the Supreme Council for Family Affairs and then at Sharjah TV, before embarking on a career as a researcher and producer at Baynounah Media Group.

In 2011, she wrote and directed the short narrative film Soul which won first prize in its category at the Emirates Film Competition during the Abu Dhabi Film Festival. She followed this with other films, including Kayani in 2013. Her short film Dhaba was selected to compete at the Gulf Film Festival.

That same year (2011), she launched her literary career by publishing her first novel, The Manuscripts of Khawaja Antoine, alongside a collection of short stories titled Al-Dakhab.

== Works ==
- Manuscripts of Khawaja Antoine, Sharjah : Department of Culture and Information, 2011. ISBN 9948046366
- Al-Dakhab (a collection of short stories), Abu Dhabi: Ministry of Culture, Youth and Community Development, 2011. ISBN 9789948071242

== See also ==
- Basimah Yunus
- Manal bin Amr
