= Lock&Stock =

Cell phone educational app

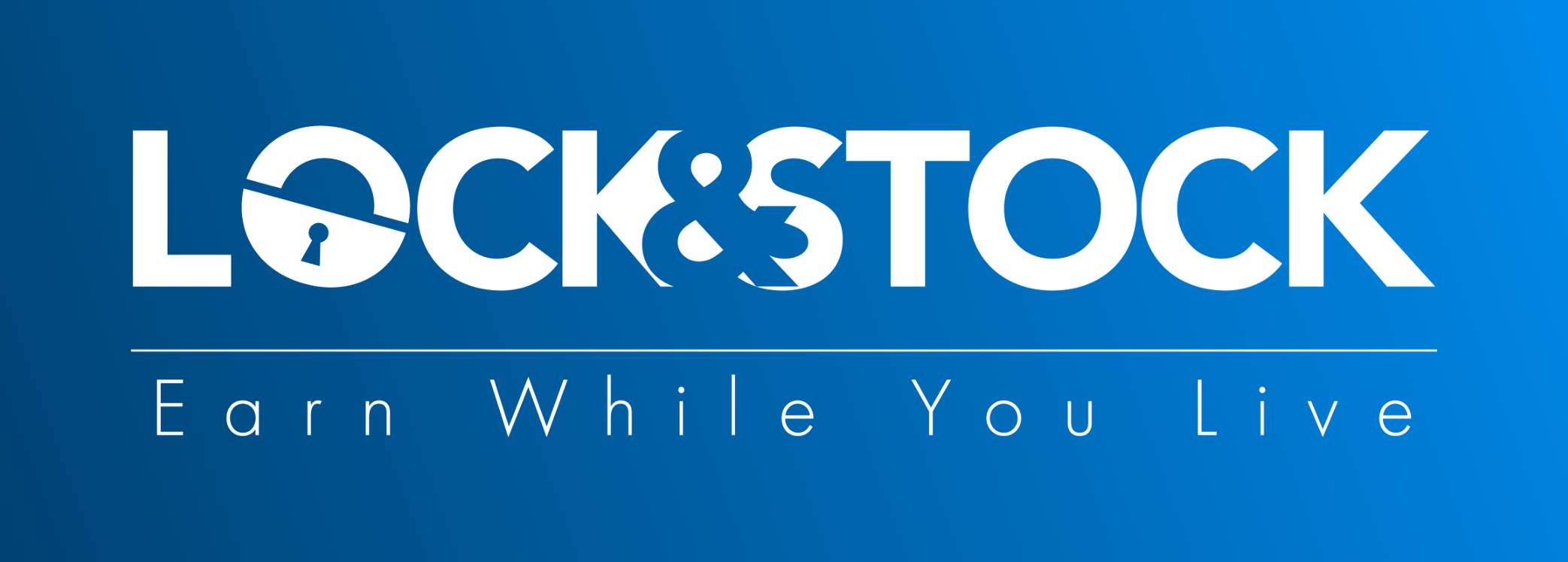
- Type: Private
- Industry: Education
- Founded: 2017
- Founders: Craig Fernandes
- Headquarters: Dubai, UAE
- Area served: Worldwide
- Products: Lock&Stock App
- Website: www.lockandstock.app

Lock&Stock is a mobile application in the educational sector intended at helping students by discouraging the use of mobile phones during classes. They aim to reduce the use of cell phones by students and encourage their digital wellbeing by providing rewards and points when they stay off their phones. The application has 1,181 university partners and has dispersed over AED 3 million scholarships in 2020.

== History ==
The Lock&Stock app was founded in 2017 and is headquartered in Dubai, UAE. Craig Fernandes, a former student at the University of Iowa in the United States founded the Lock&Stock app along with his father Ian Fernandes as co-founder and COO, and with Hussain Ali Asgar, joining as Chief Marketing Officer. It was founded to counter the menace of digital addiction, with students wasting approximately 20% of their time on mobile phones during classes. According to new research from the United Arab Emirates University, almost 30 percent of young Emiratis might be addicted to their phones.

== Features ==
Lock&Stock is a free to use mobile app for students that allows them to earn keys each time their phones are locked. A student earns one key for every minute they are away from their phones. The longer time the student's phone is locked, the more rewards he earns. The app is programmed to only work on campuses. Students can use their rewards to get discounts from brands and to secure scholarships. Once the student leaves the marked radius, they can no longer collect rewards. Lock&Stock recently launched SecureMyScholarship, a website that allows students to secure scholarships from over 1,000 universities.
