= Sheikha Najla Al Qasimi =

United Arab Emirates diplomat

- نجلاء محمد القاسمي

Ambassador to Sweden
- In office 2008–?
- President: Khalifa bin Zayed Al Nahyan

Ambassador to Denmark
- In office ?–?
- President: Khalifa bin Zayed Al Nahyan

Ambassador to Finland
- In office ?–?
- President: Khalifa bin Zayed Al Nahyan

Ambassador to Portugal
- In office ?–?
- President: Khalifa bin Zayed Al Nahyan

Shaikha Najlaa Mohammad Salem Al Qasimi (Arabic: نجلاء محمد القاسمي, born 1970) is a United Arab Emirates diplomat who has served as the UAE's Ambassador to Sweden, Denmark, Finland, and Portugal.

== Personal life ==
Al Qasimi has a Bachelor of Arts degree in Political Science from the United Arab Emirates University. She has an MSc and a PhD from Stockholm University.

== Career ==
In, Al Qasimi joined HSBC bank in a graduate role. She later for the Emirates Center for Strategic Studies and Research. She began her political career in 2005 as a secretary. She worked at the European and American Affairs in Abu Dhabi, and a United Nations diplomat in Geneva, Switzerland. In 2008, Al Qasimi was appointed as the UAE ambassador to Sweden. Al Qasimi and Hissa Abdulla Ahmed Al-Otaiba were the first two female UAE ambassadors. At the time, there were 3,000 Emiratis in Sweden, and 12 Emiratis in Stockholm, where the embassy is located. She later worked as the UAE ambassador to Finland and Denmark, before becoming UAE ambassador to Portugal.

Al Qasimi has been on the board of Women for Sustainable Growth and Women in International Security. She is a lecturer at Zayed University in Dubai, UAE.
