= Ibrahim Galadari =

Emirati dermatologist

Ibrahim Galadari is a dermatologist and currently a professor in United Arab Emirates University and head of Galadari Derma Clinic, a private dermatology practice in Dubai. Galadari is also one of the founder members in the Faculty of Medicine and Human Science at the United Arab Emirates University situated in Al Ain.

== Education ==
Galadari obtained his medical degree M.B.B.Ch. from Cairo University, Egypt in 1979. He then pursued his specializations in dermatology and venereology. He graduated with a master's degree, MSc, from Cairo University, Egypt in 1983. Then traveled to the United States of America to be part of a Fellowship in Dermatopathology at Wayne State University in 1987. During the time when he was in Wayne State University, he completed his Doctorate degree, MD in 1988.

== Career ==
=== Clinical career ===
Galadari spent his internship and residency years in Cairo University Hospitals from 1979 to 1983. He then became a dermatologist at Rashid Hospital (Dubai Health Authority). He then moved to the United Arab Emirates University based in Al Ain as they were establishing their Faculty of Medicine and Health Sciences in 1986. He currently is a professor and consultant dermatologist practicing in United Arab Emirates University hospitals.

== Books ==
Galadari published studies in refereed medical journals and is an editorial board member of SkinMed Journal.

1. Histopathology of the Skin, by Lever & Lever. Contributed in the chapter of tumors, 1990
2. Editors of Diabetes Mellitus and its complications, 1993
3. Skin and Hair (Arabic edition), 1989, 1992, 1994 (4 editions)
4. Handbook on Dermatology and Venereology, UAE University Press1994 (first edition), 1997 (second edition), 2000 (third edition).
5. Skin and cosmetic. Arabic book, 2008
