= Ali AlShaali =

Emirati poet, publisher and activist

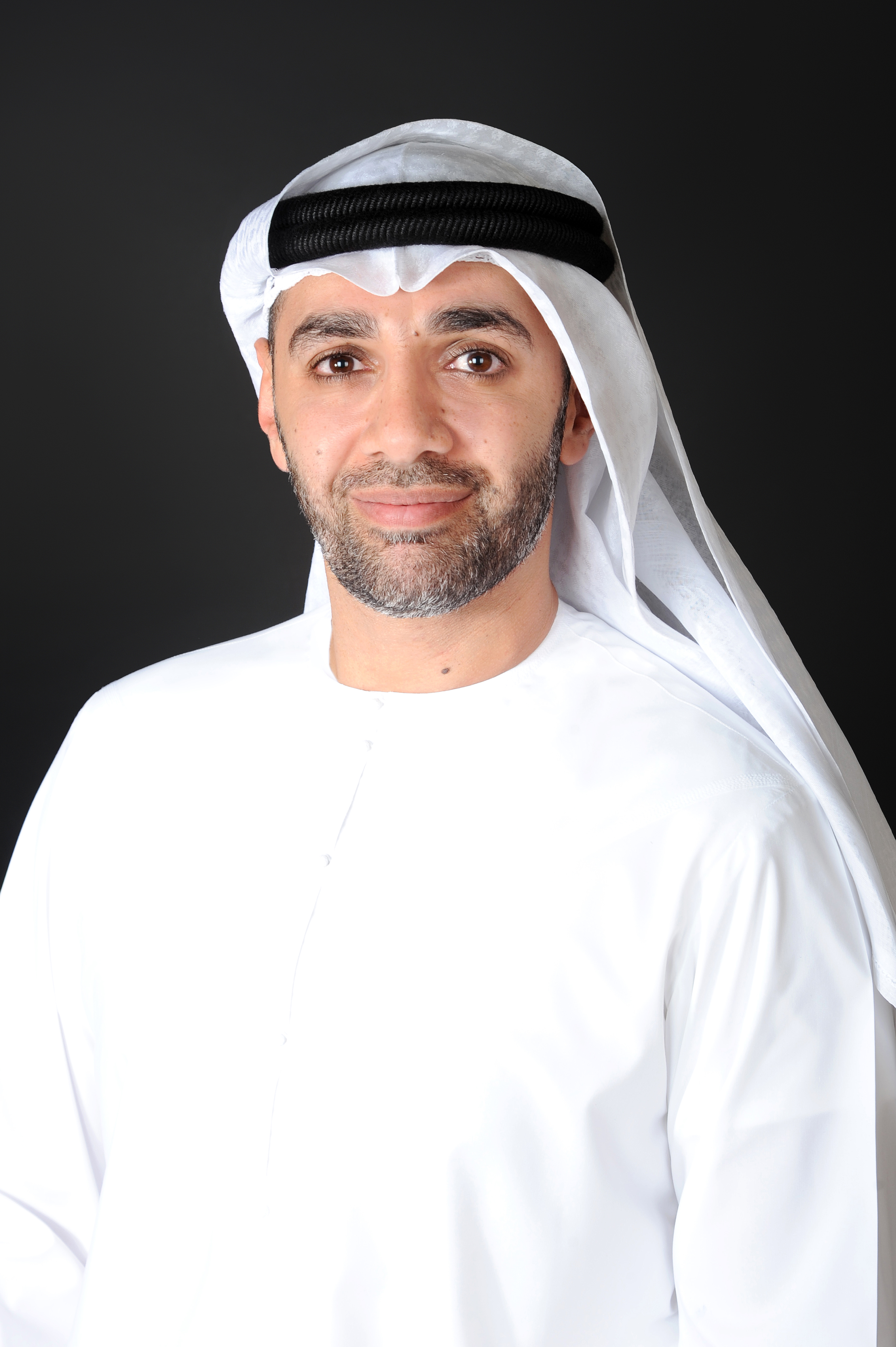
- Born: 11 November 1978 (age 47)
- Occupation: Founder of Al Hudhud Group
- Notable awards: Al Owais Cultural Award

Ali AlShaali (Arabic: علي الشعالي) is an Emirati poet, publisher, and cultural activist. He published a number of poetry collections, including "A Bee and a Rababa," "Faces and Weary Others," "Earth Has but One Soul," "Show Me the Way to the Cave," and "The Grass Resembles Us, So Do the Clouds." He also published a novel titled "The Alive Live Being" and a collection of essays titled "Chambers That Have Windows."

His works were longlisted for the Sheikh Zayed Book Award, and one of his novels won the Owais Cultural Award. His works were translated into several languages, including English, Spanish, Turkish, and Korean.

AlShaali is also an art collector and a contributor to art galleries and calligraphy and graphic art seminars. Additionally, he is active in several cultural foundations and committees, including The Emirati Writers Union. He hosted a number of seminars and panel discussions surrounding diverse topics in book expos and on social media platforms. Additionally, he has participated in several poetry readings and literary events on the local, regional, and international scales.

AlShaali founded Al Hudhud Group in 2011, and it comprises Al Hudhud for Publishing and Distribution, Alloha Publishing, and Flamingo Stationery.

== Education ==
AlShaali obtained a bachelor's degree in Civil Engineering from the United Arab Emirates University (UAEU). He also obtained master's degree in Project Management from George Washington University. He also completed the Mohammed Bin Rashed 'Creating Leaders For Tomorrow' program, in collaboration with Harvard University. AlShaali is a verified trainer in the field of training and development from the Knowledge and Human Development Authority, Dubai, in addition to completing over 150 training courses.

== Literary works ==
- A Bee and a Rababa (Poetry Collection) 2003
- Faces and Weary Others (Poetry Collection) 2009
- Earth Has but One Soul (Poetry Collection) 2013
- The Alive Live Being (Novel) 2019
- Show Me the Way to the Cave (Poetry Collection) 2022
- Chambers That Have Windows (Essays and Reflections) 2023
- The Grass Resembles Us, So Do the Clouds (Poetry Collection) 2023

== Roles and achievements ==
AlShaali occupied a number of professional positions, including:

- Civil Engineer, Maintenance and Projects, Emirates Telecommunications Corporation (Etisalat)
- Project Manager, Real Estate Development, Dubai Properties, Dubai Holding Group
- Director of the Publishing and Translation Department, and then the Director of the Knowledge Production Department, Mohammed bin Rashid Al Maktoum Knowledge Foundation
- CEO, Dubai International Poetry Festival
- Assistant Undersecretary for Culture and Arts, and Advisor at the Ministry of Culture and Youth in the UAE
- Deputy Chairman of the Board of Emirates Publishers Association
- Board Member, Cultural and Scientific Symposium
- Board Member, the “1971 initiative”, the Office of the Crown Prince of Dubai
- Advisory Committee Chair, Abu Dhabi Translation Conference
- Advisory Committee Member, College of Arts, University of Sharjah
- Cultural Committee Member, Emirates Writers and Authors Association
- Executive and Advisory Member, Knowledge without Borders Programme, Sharjah
- Advisory Committee Member, Emirates Airline Festival of Literature, Dubai
- Founding Guest of “In the Presence of Books” programme, Sharjah TV
- Advisory Committee Member, “The House of Poetry” Magazine published by Bayt Al Shir, Abu Dhabi
- Editorial Board Member, “Qaf” Magazine published by the Emirates Writers and Authors Association
- Certified Trainer, Hamdan bin Mohammed Students Personal Development Programme
- Member of the Arabic Language Protection Association, UAE
