= Maryam Alzoaby =

Emarati writer

Maryam Rashed Alzoaby
- Born: Emirate of Ras Al Khaimah, United Arab Emirates
- Occupation: Employee in the Ministry of Culture, Youth and Community Development in the UAE
- Genre: Novelist
- Notable awards: Naguib Mahfouz Award for Arabic Fiction in 2013

Maryam Rashed Alzoaby (Arabic: مريم الزعابي) is a female Emirati writer and novelist, born in the Emirate of Ras Al Khaimah. She holds a Bachelor of Arts in the College of Humanities and Social Sciences from the United Arab Emirates University, majoring in history and archaeology, and a specialized certificate in heritage from the United Arab Emirates University and Zayed University. She is an employee in the Ministry of Culture, Youth and Community Development in the UAE.

Her first novel was published in 2009 under the title Only in Red, then she published the novel For what sin was she killed and their events take place in the Palestinian territories, where the events of the novel For what sin was she killed takes place in the Gaza City in Palestine about a Palestinian journalist trying hard to reach the truth and demanding the rights of vulnerable Palestinian refugees in the camps inside and outside Palestine, and her wish was to reach the Israeli Knesset to raise the voice of truth in it, and she would be exposed to many events and pains on her journey.

She also published two collections of short stories, the first entitled It Happened One Night and the second directed to children, entitled The Little Astronaut.

== Awards ==
- Naguib Mahfouz Award for Arabic Fiction in 2013, granted by the Supreme Council of Culture in Egypt.

== Works ==
Book name	Publisher	Publishing Date	Pages	ISBN	OCLC
Only In Red	Abu Dhabi: Ministry of Culture, Youth and Community Development	2009	377	ISBN 9948151630	864676163
Dana and Raindrop	Sharjah: Department of Culture and Information	2013	71	ISBN 9789948203841	1369247668
Henna Inscription	Abu Dhabi: Ministry of Culture, Youth and Community Development	2012	42	ISBN 9789948071129	1129080297
Valentine	Kuwait: Dar Sama for publishing and distribution	2015	239	ISBN 9789996655708	945767235
Gheidaa	Cairo: Kalima Cultural Foundation	2014	94		
For what sin was she killed: a Novel	Kuwait: Dar Sama for publishing and distribution	2018	322	ISBN 9789990680249	1090069158
It Happened One Night: Stories	Amman: Spaces for publishing and distribution	2018	74	ISBN 9789923716786	1201412019
The Dreams	Abu Dhabi: Department of Culture and Tourism – Abu Dhabi Language Centre	2023	94		
