= International Government Communication Forum =

Annual forum on government communication held in Sharjah since 2012

International Government Communication Forum المنتدى الدولي للاتصال الحكومي
- Status: Active
- Genre: Forum
- Frequency: Annual
- Venue: Expo Centre Sharjah
- Locations: Sharjah, United Arab Emirates
- Inaugurated: 2012
- Organizer: Sharjah Government Media Bureau
- Website: igcf.sgmb.ae

The International Government Communication Forum (IGCF; Arabic: المنتدى الدولي للاتصال الحكومي) is an annual forum on government communication and the relationship between governments, the public and the media, held in Sharjah, United Arab Emirates, since 2012 and organised by the Sharjah Government Media Bureau. Held under the patronage of the Ruler of Sharjah, Sheikh Sultan bin Muhammad Al-Qasimi, each edition brings together former heads of state and government, officials and communication and media specialists.

== History ==
The first edition was held in 2012, organised by the Sharjah Media Centre, later renamed the Sharjah Government Media Bureau. The second edition, on 24–25 February 2013, was held under the theme "Effective Communication, Unified Message"; its guest of honour was the then Turkish prime minister Recep Tayyip Erdoğan, and the former United Nations secretary-general Kofi Annan and the former Arab League secretary-general Amr Moussa were among the speakers. The Ruler of Sharjah opened the third edition at Expo Centre Sharjah in February 2014, with the last Soviet president, Mikhail Gorbachev, as guest of honour.

At the sixth edition (22–23 March 2017) the chairman of the Sharjah Media Council, Sheikh Sultan bin Ahmed Al Qasimi, launched the International Government Communication Centre, a research and knowledge centre managed by the Sharjah Government Media Bureau. The news website Sharjah 24 was launched during the 2015 forum. The eighth edition, in March 2018, was held under the theme "Digital Millennium. Where To?" with more than forty speakers from sixteen countries, among them the President of Mauritius, Ameenah Gurib-Fakim, the former Polish president Lech Wałęsa, the inventor of the World Wide Web, Tim Berners-Lee, and the Wikipedia co-founder Jimmy Wales.

The tenth edition was held on 26–27 September 2021 at Expo Centre Sharjah under the theme "Historic Lessons, Future Ambitions", and was opened by Sultan bin Ahmed Al Qasimi. The Ruler of Sharjah opened the fourteenth edition on 10 September 2025 under the theme "Communication for Quality of Life", with 237 speakers in more than 110 events, including 51 panel discussions and 22 workshops, on food security, public health, education, environmental sustainability and the green economy.

== Sharjah Government Communication Award ==
The Sharjah Media Centre launched the Sharjah Government Communication Award in 2013; it is presented annually during the forum to organisations and individuals in the field of government communication.
