= Aisha al-Ghais =

Emirati poet

- Born: Ras Al-Khaimah, United Arab Emirates
- Education: AlWasl University - MA United Arab Emirates University - BA
- Occupation: Senior Specialist at the Ministry of Education
- Writing career
- Genres: Emirati Literature, Children Literature, Emirati Heritage Studies
- Notable awards: Hamdan Bin Rashid Al Maktoum Award For Distinguished Academic Performance Khalifa Award For Education Sharjah Award for Educational Excellence Ras Al-Khaimah (RAK) Award for Education and Excellence Sharjah Award for Voluntary Work

Aisha al-Ghais (Arabic: عائشة الغيص, romanized: ʻĀʼishah al-Ghayṣ) is an Emirati poet and storyteller, and she specializes in writing about Emirati heritage.

== Biography ==
She was born in Ras Al-Khaimah, United Arab Emirates.

She obtained her bachelor's degree in Arts and Education from the United Arab Emirates University (UAEU) before obtaining her master's degree in Literature and Criticism from AlWasl University, where she did her thesis on Emirati literature.

She worked as a researcher and novelist and received a number of awards for her research, literary, and voluntary work. These awards include: Khalifa Award for Educational Excellence, Ras Al-Khaimah Excellence Award, Sharjah Educational Excellence Award, Emirati Women Award, Al-Owais Literary Award, and more.

== Awards ==
Aisha al-Ghais obtained a number of educational, literary, voluntary, and scholarly awards, including the following:

- Hamdan Bin Rashid Al Maktoum Award For Distinguished Academic Performance
- Khalifa Award For Education
- Sharjah Award for Educational Excellence
- Ras Al-Khaimah (RAK) Award for Education and Excellence
- Sharjah Award for Voluntary Work

== Publications ==
=== Short story collections ===
- Nuskhatun La Tashbahuni (A Clone Dissimilar To Me) - 2011
- AsSirrul Dafin (Buried Secret) - 2011

=== Poetry collections ===
- Thakiratul Bahri (The Memory of The Sea) - 2010
- Haninul Mawasim (Seasons' Nostalgia)

=== Heritage studies ===
- Danat Minal Emirat (Pearls From The Emirates) - 2008
- Al-Fasihu Fil Amthalil Emiratiya (Emirati Proverbs: Part One) - 2020
- Al-Hikayatul Shaabiya Lil Amthalil Arabiya (Folktales of Emirati Proverbs: Part One) - 2021
- Anthropolojiyatul Hikaya Al-Shaabiya Al-Emiratiya (The A) nthropology of the Emirati Folktale: A Study of Models of the Emirati Folktale Heritage) - 2021
- Mu'jamul Kinayat AshShaabiya Al-Emiratiya (Dictionary of Emirati popular metaphors) - 2021
- Bara'atul Istihlali Fil Shi'iril Nabatiyil Emiratiy (The ingenuity of the beginning in Emirati Nabati poetry: an aesthetic artistic study) - 2022
- Al-Maani Al-Balaghiya Li Asaleebil Amri Wal Nahi Fil Amthalil Emaratiya (The rhetorical meanings of commands and prohibitions in Emirati proverbs: a rhetorical analytical study) - 2022
- Mu'jamul Dakhil Fil Aamiyal Emaratiya (Al-Dakhil dictionary in Emirati colloquial language) - 2022
- Al-Tayru Wal Dawab Fil Amthalil Emaratiya (Birds and animals in Emirati proverbs) - 2022
- Ramziyatul Tayri Fil Shi'ri An-Nabatiyil Emaratiy (The symbolism of the bird in Emirati Nabati poetry: an aesthetic artistic study) - 2022
- Osloobiyatil Adabil Qiyadiy (Stylistics of leadership literature: Emirati poetry as a model) - 2022

=== Children literature ===
- Al-Qamariyul Ajeeb (The Wonderful Lunar) - 2016
- Al-Hanthalul Anid (The Stubborn Palmer) - 2016
- AsSayyadu Wa Samakatul Barbar (The Fisherman and the Barber Fish) - 2016
- Wa Lil Nakhlati Hikayatun (The palm tree has a story) - 2016
- Al-Ghaymatu Dima Fi Liwa (The cloud is always in Liwa)
- Hakatha Tubnal Awtan (This is how nations are built) - 2019
- Farashatul Saada (Butterfly of Happiness) - 2019
- AnNahla 'Asoola (The Honey Bird)
- Umm Khalfan Wa Khirafiha (Umm Khalfan and her sheep) - 2019
- Ar-Ratbu Tabasheer Al-Qayth (Wet signs of heat) - 2020
- Laysa As-Siru Fil Qubba'a (The secret is not in the hat)
- Alamatni An-Nujoom (The stars taught me) - 2020
- Al-Amma Salama Wa Dajajtuha (Aunt Salama and her chickens)
- Al-Battatu Shahraman Al-Akwal (Shahraman Al-Akol The Duck)
- At-Tawus Marmar Wal Ghurabul Aghbar (The Alabaster Peacock and The Dusty Crow)
- Aljum At-Tammaa' (The Greedy Toad)
- Ma Atyabul Luqaimat (The Delicious Lugaimat) - 2020
- Aj-Jamalu Kahil (Kahil The Camel) - 2020
- Matha Rasamat Hind? (What Did Hind Draw?) - 2020
- Khudeira' Wa Ahlamuhal Kabira (Khudeira' and Her Big Dreams) - 2020
- Aousha bint Khalifa Al Suwaidi: Timeless Emirati Figures - 2021
- Marwan Wa Misbarul Amal (Marwan and the Hope Probe) - 2021
- Salma Salem Al Sharhan, the first Emirati nurse - 2021
- Aklat Osha Fi Ramadhan (Osha's Ramadan Meals) - 2021
- Oshana Wal Thi'b (Oshana and the Wolf: An Emirati Folktale) - 2021
- Thabiya Wa Sirrul Miftah (The Doe and The Key's Secret) - 2021
- Al-Thaa'lbu Wal Imlaq Al-Saghir (The Fox and The Mini Giant) - 2021
- Saeed bin Rashid bin Ateej Al Hameli: A series of timeless Emirati personalities - 2021
- Himaratul Qayila (Hamara Al-Qayla: A story inspired by Emirati folklore) - 2021
- Baqartu Shumoos Al-Huloob (The Dairy Cow) - 2021
- Basma Wal Aam Al-Jadid (Basma and The New Year) - 2021
- Budoor Wa Sirbal Tuyoor (Budoor and The Flock of Birds) - 2021
- Kitabu Rasa'il Ila Imra'a Taskunul Jannatu Tahtu Qadamayha (Letters to my mother)
- Alam Tasmaa' Qawlal Mathal? (Didn't you hear what they say?) - 2021
- Ar-Ra'iya Wal Nimr (The Shepherdess and the Tiger) - 2021
- Zaruqa Al Hakima (Zarooqa The Wise) - 2021
- Taa'iru Abul Hannaa' Yat'alamu Mihnatal Jadat (A robin learns the profession of grandmothers) - 2021
- Al Majidi Bin Dhaher: Timeless Emirati Figures Series - 2022
- Watanil Aghla (My Dearest Land) - 2022
