= Expo Centre Sharjah =

Coordinates: 25.310715°N 55.370354°E

Expo Centre Sharjah مركز اكسبو الشارقة
- Interactive map of Expo Centre Sharjah مركز اكسبو الشارقة
- Location: Opposite Al Arab Mall, Al Khan Area
- Owner: Sharjah Chamber of Commerce & Industry
- Operator: Mr. Saif Mohammed Al Madfa, CEO of Expo Center Sharjah

Construction
- Opened: 3 January 1977; 49 years ago
- Renovated: 14 January 2002; 24 years ago

Website
- expo-centre.ae

Expo Centre Sharjah (Arabic: مركز اكسبو الشارقة) is an exhibition and convention centre, located in Sharjah (Al Khan), United Arab Emirates. It is the exhibition wing of the Sharjah Chamber of Commerce and Industry (SCCI).

== History and overview ==
Expo Centre Sharjah was established by an Italian American Mr. Frederick Pittera in 1977 – as a first exhibition venue in the United Arab Emirates and the Gulf Cooperative Council (GCC). Initially, the centre was popular for festival style public shows which featured some retail exhibitors, circus shows and concerts for a duration of three weeks each in winter months. Fred imported large marquis from the USA to provide for the exhibition space and a Circus tent with a seating capacity of 1200 in addition to an open air arena for various acrobatic performances. He sold shares to his local partners Sheikh Ahmed and Sheikh Salem Al Qassimi in 1988 and left the UAE.

1988-1991

Sheikh Salem Al Qassimi, the chairman of Al Batha, a conglomerate that owned Expo Centre Sharjah appointed a veteran exhibition manager Mr. Stefan Kemball to manage the exhibition ground at its now new location in Al Khan district Sharjah. By this time the popularity of public events started to recede as more and more shopping malls started to emerge in neighboring emirate of Dubai. Stefan Kemball whose experience was all in managing trade events was less equipped to manage a public shows entity effectively. This resulted in regular losses and Sheikh Salem decided to sell the company to Sharjah Chamber of Commerce and industry as approved by H.H. Dr. Sheikh Sultan Al Qassimi, the Ruler of Sharjah. Expo Centre Sharjah was sold along with its granted land in Al Khan district to Sharjah Chamber of Commerce and industry (SCCI) in 1991 for a Lump sum amount with management and assets.

1991-2013

The chairman of SCCI Mr. Hassan Abdullah Al Noman

and Director General Mr. Saeed Al Jarwan quickly realized that Expo Centre is in losses due to changing trends in public entertainment and its recently bought property required a significant investment to become commercially viable.

The new owners decided to revamp the non performing management and hired a team of professionals including Fasahat Ali Khan, Muhammad Ali Bin Dukhain and Carl Muller. Stefan Kemball was released from his service as CEO and Saeed Al Jarwan became its first director general.

The management team.

Mr. Saeed Al Jarwan was a figurehead of Expo Centre Sharjah and the management team was headed by Fasahat Ali Khan as Deputy Director General, Mohammed Bin Dukhain as Director Sales & Marketing and Carl Muller as a senior Commercial Director.Carl Muller had worked at Expo Centre as a Vice President International Sales during Fred Pittera's tenure. Fasahat was manager at KPMG Dubai and had substantial experience in Advisory whereas Mohammed was in Special Services with the Ministry of Interiors UAE.

The Turn-around Project

Over the years, it became the most popular trade exhibition venue and home to the Gulf's best-attended trade shows. It serves, almost exclusively, the growing trade of the Northern Emirates of Ras Al Khaimah, Ajman, Fujairah and Umm Al Quwain. It links, by arterial highways, the capital of Abu Dhabi and beyond into Bahrain, Saudi Arabia, Turkey and the Middle East. Northwards it serves Oman and Yemen.

On 16 September 2002, His Highness Dr. Sheikh Sultan bin Mohammed Al Qassimi, Ruler of Sharjah and Member of the Supreme Council of the UAE, inaugurated the current Expo Centre Sharjah facility, featuring six halls and technical and visitor facilities to cater for events from industries.

It is currently the region's leading trade exhibition venue, and serves as a financial hub and a landmark for the Emirate of Sharjah and the country.

ECS has played a key role in positioning Sharjah as one of the top 10 business cities in the Gulf region and the UAE, within the global exhibitions sector. It has been involved in hosting and organizing some highly focused B2B and B2C shows, which have brought the Emirate to significant prominence.

Additionally, ECS has also managed a newly launched exhibition centre, Expo Al Dhaid in Al Dhaid city to cater to a different approach of events and activities.

== Facilities ==
The 6 indoor multi-purpose exhibition halls cover a total footprint of 42,000 m2, with an additional 6,000 m2 parking. Smaller supporting venues are ideal for meetings, public seminars, celebration or launch events loading, unloading and setting up of all formats of stands and other assets is a breeze thanks to easy access routes from the 6 service gates, wide service areas as well as from the central boulevard.

The centre also houses a children's play area, prayer rooms and a VIP area & majlis.

== Notable exhibitions ==
- Sharjah International Book Fair (SIBF)
- Sharjah International Book Fair... Passion for Knowledge Driving Development (eyeofriyadh.com)
- Sharjah Children's Reading Festival
- International Government Communication Forum
- Sharjah Seen Awards
- Sharjah Entrepreneurship Festival (SEF)
- Xposure (International Photography Festival)
- Sharjah International Narrator Forum
- Watch & Jewellery Middle East Show
- Jewels of Emirates Show
- SteelFab
- International Education Show
- Furniture 360

== Corporate social responsibility ==
In April 2020, in efforts to counter the COVID-19 pandemic, the ECS was converted into a field hospital, Corporate Social Responsibility with a capacity to treat up to 5,000 COVID-19 patients. In January 2021, ECS was converted to a vaccination centre until September 2021.
