= Hessa Al Muhairi =

Emirate children writer

- Born: United Arab Emirates
- Education: MA in Management and Policy
- Awards: Won the Sheikh Zayed Book Award of the Children's Literature category

Hessa Al Muhairi (Arabic: حصة المهيري) is an Emirati writer who was born in the United Arab Emirates. She published two books for children which are "Whose Footprints Are These?" and "Dinoraf". In 2018, her book "The Dinoraf" won the Sheikh Zayed Book Award of the Category of Children's Literature.

== Education and career ==
Hessa Al Muhairi holds a bachelor's degree in Early Childhood Education. In 2014, she attained a double masters in Education Management and Policy from Deakin University in Australia. Currently, she is pursuing her PhD in Education from a British University. Al Muhairi has been working as a nursery teacher since she graduated in 2010. Her first book "Dinoraf", which was published in 2017, won the Sheikh Zayed Book Award for the category of Children's Literature in 2018. In 2019, The Sheikh Zayed book Award announced that Al Muhairi's book "The Dinoraf" will be translated into English, French and Italian after signing an agreement between an Emirati publisher Al Hudhud and an Italian publisher Marco y Marcos.

== Works ==
- Whose Footprints Are These? (Original title: Atharu Aqdan Man Hathihi), 2010
- Dinoraf (Original title: al-Dinoraf), 2017

== Awards ==
- 2018: Her story "Dinoraf" won the Sheikh Zayed Book Award for the Category of Children's Literature.

== See also ==
- Lateefa Buti
- Nadia Al Najjar
- Salha Obeid
- Maryam Saqer Al Qasimi
