= Poeticity =

Concept in poetry translation studies

Poeticity (Turkish: şiiriyet) a concept in poetry translation and translation studies associated with the Turkish scholar and literary translator Mehmet Hakkı Suçin. In this usage, poeticity refers to the recreation of a poem's semantic, rhythmic, aesthetic, affective and cultural dimensions in the target language, rather than the transfer of lexical meaning alone.

The concept should be distinguished from the broader literary-theoretical use of poetics and poeticity. In Suçin's formulation, it serves as an evaluative framework for poetry translation, especially when formal equivalence, rhyme, metre, or literal meaning alone are considered insufficient to assess the success of a translated poem.

== Background ==
Suçin discussed the concept in his 2025 article "Şiir Çevirisinde Stratejik Seçimler ve 'Şiiriyet': Shakespeare ve İmru'ul-Kays Çevirilerinin Değerlendirilmesi" ("Strategic Choices and 'Poeticity' in Poetry Translation: An Evaluation of Shakespeare and Imru' al-Qays Translations"), published in the Istanbul Journal of Arabic Studies. The study evaluates Turkish translations of William Shakespeare's Sonnet 66 by Can Yücel and Talât Sait Halman, together with Suçin's Turkish translation of the Mu‘allaqa of Imru' al-Qais.

The framework is developed in dialogue with André Lefevere's typology of poetry translation strategies, including phonemic translation, literal translation, metrical translation, prose translation, rhymed translation, blank verse translation and interpretation or version. Suçin's study argues that poetry translation requires a balance between form and content, and that different translation strategies may achieve poeticity if they succeed in recreating the poetic effect of the source text in the target language.

== Components ==
In Suçin's model, poeticity is described as an umbrella concept comprising several interrelated components. These include:

Component	Focus in poetry translation
Content balance	The preservation of the poem's semantic structure, themes, imagery and conceptual density.
Time, place and tradition	The transfer or recontextualisation of historical, geographical and cultural references.
Affect and harmony	The recreation of rhythm, sound patterning, emotional movement and musicality.
Communicative value	The degree to which the target poem produces an effect comparable to that of the source poem.
Poetic sensibility	The translator's ability to respond to the poem as a creative and interpretive literary act.
Linguistic-aesthetic equilibrium	The balance between verbal form, stylistic elegance, rhetorical force and meaning.

The model therefore treats poetry translation as both a form of creative rewriting and a linguistic transfer. It gives particular weight to the translator's role in mediating between the historical and cultural world of the source poem and the aesthetic expectations of the target language.

== Applications ==
=== Shakespeare and Imru' al-Qays ===
In Suçin's 2025 study, Can Yücel's translation of Sonnet 66 is described as closer to Lefevere's "version" strategy, since it freely reinterprets the source poem for the target culture. Talât Sait Halman's translation is presented as more formally faithful, showing features of metrical and rhyme translation. Suçin's translation of Imru' al-Qays's Mu‘allaqa is characterised as a hybrid strategy combining elements of rhyme translation and version, with an emphasis on balancing form, cultural context and poetic effect.

=== Al-Mutanabbi translation ===
The model has also been applied to the translation of classical Arabic poetry. A 2025 article by İbrahim Ethem Polat and Ahmet Tutuk examined Suçin's Turkish translations of poems by al-Mutanabbi in İnsanın Şarkısı: Seçilmiş Şiirler ("The Song of Man: Selected Poems") within the framework of poeticity. The study evaluated the translations according to criteria such as content balance, affect and harmony, communicative value, poetic sensitivity and linguistic-aesthetic balance. It concluded that the translations largely preserved the themes and poetic intensity of the source poems, while also producing certain aesthetic and semantic shifts in accordance with the norms of the target language.

=== Artificial intelligence and poetry translation ===
Gürkan Dağbaşı and Murat Özcan discussed poeticity in relation to artificial intelligence and literary translation in the chapter "Yapay Zekâ ve Şiiriyet" ("Artificial Intelligence and Poeticity"), published in the edited volume Arap Dilinde Yapay Zekâ Destekli Çeviri, Eğitim ve Edebiyat Araştırmaları. Their discussion places the concept within debates on the limits of machine translation in literary and poetic texts, especially where rhythm, metaphor, cultural reference and aesthetic effect are central to translation quality.

== See also ==
- André Lefevere
- Literary translation
- Poetics
- Translation studies
