= Mona Al-Tamimi =

Emirati author

Monna Tamimi
- Born: Mona Tamim
- Occupation: writer
- Notable work: The Berry Keeper (Hars AL Toot) The Soufi Messages (Al rsa2al Al Sofia) The Red Pen ( Al Kalam Al Ahmar) The Witness from Seville (Shad mn Eshbelia)

Mona Al-Tamimi is an Emirati author who had published several novels and books, the most prominent book is "The Berry keeper", which is considered as the first book of her work. Both novels " The Sufi Letters", and "The Red Pen" were published by the Arab Scientific Publishers. The most famous work she had published is the novel "The Witness from Seville," where she narrates about a fictional historical figure who had lived at the city of Seville and witnessed all the circumstances of the city.

== Early life and education ==
In her writings, Mona Al Tamimi focuses on the dialectic of the relationship between two parties; one is constant, which is the reality, and the other is variable. In her first novel, The Berry keeper, Mona deals with the relationship between man and nature, nature is shown as a refuge for man when he is surrounded by reality, she observed in the second novel which was issued under the title " The Sufi Messages" the relationship between men and women while coping with reality using Sufi tools. In her third novel, published under the title "Red Pen", she demonstrated the human's ability to achieve dreams and goals despite the obstacles of reality. The fourth novel, The Witness from Seville, dealt with the issue of human abilities to adapt with reality in different natural conditions.

== Career ==
"The Berry Keeper" is the first novel written by the author and the novelist Mona Al- Tamimi. The novel, which contains 271 pages, was published by The Arab Scientific Publishers in 2017. Some critics noted that this novel invents special magical worlds with kinetic and chromatic saturation, And these worlds are stirred by the writer through her discourse, which represents – according to some critics – the self consciousness in its ultimate isolation drowning in inner silence, and obedient to the shadows of memory and cold hints of allusions; drowned out in its monotony. The novel specifically talks about a man's relationship with nature in vivid surreal images, a man who chose to live far away in the forest in hope that he would extinguish the fire that destroyed him because he found out that his closest friend was in a relationship with the woman he loved, his close friend who preferred silence and hid everything in the name of love.

"The Sufi Messages" is another novel written by Mona and issued by the publishing company that she dealt with in most of her fictional works: The Arab Scientific Publishers. In her "Sufi letters" novel that consists of 255 pages Mona talks about artistic perceptions that give existence a different meaning in new and unexpected ways, containing philosophy, music, and artistic glances. The two protagonists characters of the novel are "Nada" and "Mugheeth", who are present in a magical beyond the imagination world, within an equation of love, the image of "woman" and "man" is presented in its true mental truthfulness, as represented by conscience and imagined by artistic sense.

The Emirati author Mona Al-Tamimi has released the novel "The Red Pen", which contains 231 pages, a novel which is classified among thrillers and adventures novels, it was published by the same company which published Mona's other novels. "The Red Pen" was published in 2019, through this novel Al-Tamimi raises the question of childhood from within the narrative text, bringing the world of childhood and adulthood through the changes of contemporary life with all its pains and hopes.

The protagonists of the novel are two brothers: the first protagonist character which is named as Hamad is a romantic dreamer, through the novel Hamad dreams of flying a plane in the sky after becoming an experienced pilot, and Hamad's father through the novel helps him to achieve his ambition; This is why he kept chasing his dream until he grew up and succeeded in achieving and turning his dream into reality, while the third protagonist character who is named as "Rashid" lost the most important features of his childhood under the difficult circumstances that accompanied the separation of his parents, he also failed to accept and deal with the absence of his father, which resulted to the attachment of the character to his mother and the rejection to his father, so he continued to live a routine life, he also received education and became a successful engineer. Through the novel Mona combined the theories of the family novel and the literary novel by establishing it according to a tripartite relationship between son, father and mother, including closeness or discordant between the three poles.

Al-Tamimi narrates in her "The Witness from Seville" book, which was published by the Arab Scientific Publisher, the story of Malik bin Ghadir Al-Eshbili and his companion Najm Al-Din. The events takes place in the eleventh century AD during the rule of Bani Abbad in Seville city, and despite that, the character of Malik is not a historical, but rather a figment of the writer's imagination. The mentioned journey in the novel is a very long journey, it starts from Mecca and ends in Cordoba, also the novel narrates the observations of Cordoba. The novel begins with the arrival of Malik bin Ghadir Al-Ishbili to Mecca and ends when he wakes up from his coma in Cordoba. The events between the arrival and advancement extended over a year, the location of the narration takes placein a non-Arabian city. Based on some critics opinions, what constitutes the body of the novel is the number of the characters involved in the narration. In "The Witness from Seville" novel, mona was interested in narrating about the trip, where she described in detail the dangers faced by the convoy on the desert, both natural and humanitarian danger such as sandstorms, Bedouin raids, chasing the demons, water scarcity, and other challenges were faced by the ship in the sea, both natural and humanitarian challenges, such as high winds, crimes, and thieves . She also discussed the noble human feelings that encourage people to unite in the face of danger, unite their efforts to find water, and show solidarity with each other regardless of their origins and beliefs. Through the novel the characters create friendships and intimateness between each other.

== Work list ==
This is a list of Mona's Al Tamimi most popular and top writings.

- "The Berry Keeper"
- “ The Sufi Messages"
- "The Red Pin"
- "The Witness from Seville"
