= Suad Jawad =

Iraqi/Emirati dubbing artist, theatre-maker and writer

- سعاد جواد
- Born: 15 February 1957 (age 69)
- Education: University of Baghdad
- Occupations: Dubbing artist; writer; theatre-maker
- Known for: "The Queen of Dubbing"

Suad Jawad, Arabic: سعاد جواد (born 15 February 1957) is an Iraqi/Emirati dubbing artist, theatre-maker and writer. She is known as the "Queen of Dubbing" and specialises in dubbing anime.

== Biography ==
Jawad was born on 15 February 1957. She was awarded a BA in Fine Arts in 1979 from the University of Baghdad. She has been outspoken about the artistry and talent needed in a good dubbing artist. In a 2016 article, she discussed how she felt that dubbing in animations had become duller over the course of her thirty-five-year career in the industry. She has also called for Arab countries to create more educational children's television programmes. She is known as the "Queen of Dubbing" for her work on children's animations. She is particularly associated with her work in anime, including appearances in: Lady Georgie as Abel; Manga Sekai Mukashi Banashi as Narrator; Rose of Versailles as Oscar.

In the 1980s, Jawad was instrumental in the foundation of children's theatres in the United Arab Emirates, where she now lives, the first being Laila's Theatre, in memory of an Emirati girl who died. She has also written plays and works of fiction; her writing focuses on the experiences of women from the Gulf, especially with regard to social issues.
