= Shaykha al-Nakhi =

Emirati writer

Shaykha Mubarak al-Nakhi (Arabic: شيخة مبارك الناخي; born 1952) is a writer in the United Arab Emirates, the first Emirati woman to publish a short story. In addition to a pioneer of the short story in the UAE, she is considered one of the country's best-known women writers.

Nakhi was born in 1952 in Sharjah, a city in the United Arab Emirates. She studied humanities at the United Arab Emirates University, graduating with a bachelor's degree in 1985, and later earned a degree in education in 1997. She has worked as an educator since 1971, including as principal of a girls' school.

In 1970, Nakhi became the first Emirati woman to publish a short story when her story "Al-Rahil" ("The Departure") appeared in a Dubai magazine. "Al-Rahil" went on to win a short story prize from the country's Ministry of Youth. She published a short story collection of the same name in 1992. This was followed by the collections "The North Wind" in 1997 and "Playing the Strings of Joy" in 2007, which dealt with issues affecting Emirati women. She also wrote a novel, Qisat Al Raheel ("Story of Departure"). Her work has been published in French translation, and in 2009, her story "Threads of Delusion" was published in English translation in the collection In a Fertile Desert.

In 1990, she helped found an organization for Emirati women authors, and she worked to produce its magazine Voice of Women, sometimes described as the first women's magazine in the UAE. She is also a founding member of the Emirates Writers Union and participates in literary festivals in the country.
