= Salha Obeid =

Emirati writer

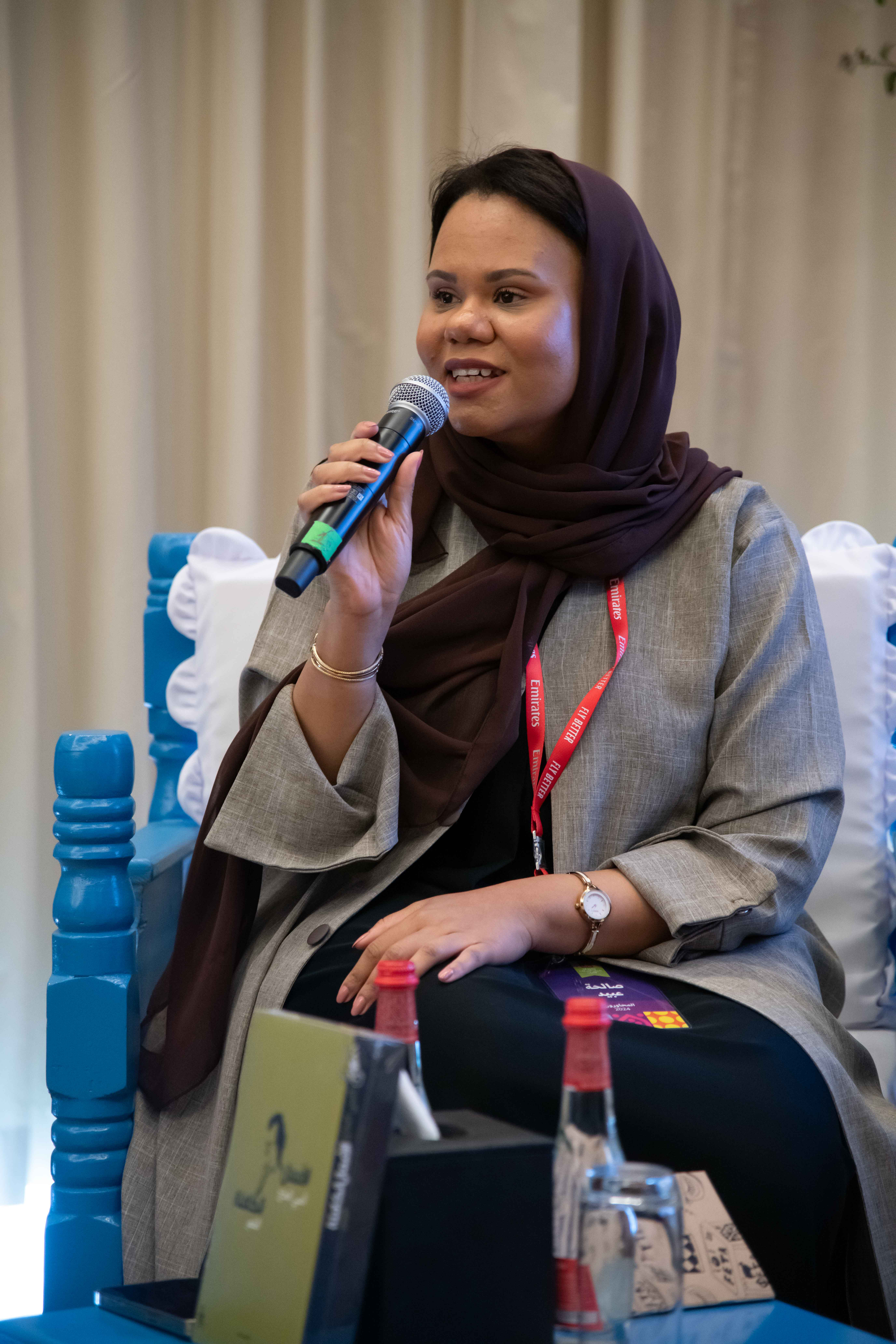
- Born: 1988 (age 37–38); United Arab Emirates
- Education: University of Sharjah, BA in Electronic Engineering
- Occupations: Engineer, writer, novelist
- Years active: 2010–present
- Awards: 2013: Won the UAE-Italy Exchange Short Story Award; 2016: her book "An Implicitly White Lock of Hair" won Al Owais Award for Creative Writing.; 2017: She was awarded the Young Emiratis Prize for Creative Writing Category for her literary work.

Salha Obeid (Arabic: صالحة عبيد) an Emirati writer and novelist was born in 1988. She published two novels and three short-story collections including "Alzheimers" which was published in 2010 and was translated into German. In 2016, her book "An Implicitly White Lock of Hair" won Al Owais Award for Creative Writing.

== Biography ==
Salha Obeid is an Emirati writer and novelist who was born on 1988 in the United Arab Emirates. She graduated from the University of Sharjah and earned a bachelor's degree in Electronic engineering. She has published two novels including "Perhaps It’s a Joke" and three short-story collections including "The Postman of Happiness". Obeid published her first short-story collection "Alzheimers" in 2010 and was translated into German a year after its publication. In 2018, she published her first novel "Perhaps It’s a Joke".

Obied has won several awards including UAE-Italy Exchange Short Story Award in 2013, Al Owais Award for Creative Writing for her book "An Implicitly White Lock of Hair" in 2016, and the Young Emiratis Prize for her literary work in 2017.

Obeid is the founder of the Society of the Intellectual project, a member of the council of the Dubai Culture and Arts Authority, and also the Association of Emirati Women Writers. She is a columnist in an Emirati newspaper "Al Roeya".

== Works ==
=== Short-story collections ===
- "Alzheimers" (original title: Al Zahaimar), 2010. This debut collection was released by Abu Dhabi Authority for Culture & Heritage and translated into German a year later.
- “The Postman of Happiness” (original title: Saee Al Saada), 2011.
- “An Implicitly White Lock of Hair” (original title: khousla baida bi Shakl Demni), 2015.

=== Novels ===
- “iPad: Life in the Manner of Zorba” (original title: Al Haya Ala Tarezat Zorba), 2013.
- “Perhaps It’s a Joke” (original title: laa’laha Mazha), 2018. This was her first novel, published through Dar Al Mutawassit in Italy.

== Awards ==
- 2013: Won the UAE-Italy Exchange Short Story Award, securing third place.
- 2016: her book “An Implicitly White Lock of Hair” was honored with the Al Owais Award for Creative Writing.
- 2017: She was awarded the Young Emiratis Prize for Creative Writing Category for her literary work.

== Affiliations ==
Beyond her writing, she is actively involved in the literary community. She is a founding member of the "Noon Al Shabab" group at the Cultural and Scientific Symposium, and serves as a member of the editorial board for "Bait Sard" magazine, which is affiliated with the Emirates Writers Union. She is also a member of the Emirates Women Writers Association. Additionally, she is a columnist for the Emirati newspaper Ru'ya and maintains a regular column titled "Shaqa'iq Hulum" (Splinters of a Dream) in Hamaleel newspaper.

== See also ==
- Lateefa Buti
- Nadia Al Najjar
- Hessa Al Muhairi
- Maryam Saqer Al Qasimi
