= Riyad Al-Saleh Al-Hussein =

Syrian poet

Riyad Al Saleh Al Hussein
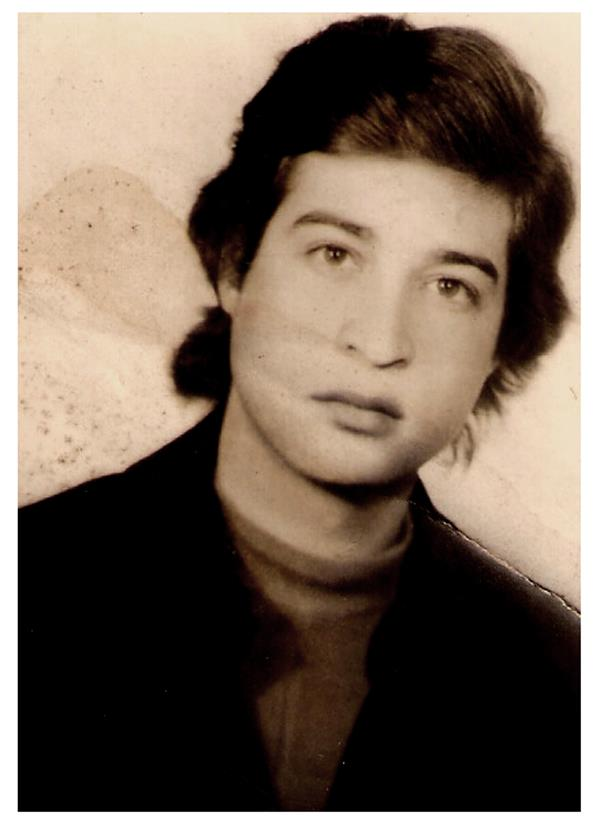
- Born: March 10, 1954; Daraa
- Died: November 20, 1982 (aged 28); Damascus
- Occupation: Poet

Riyad Al-Saleh Al-Hussein (1954–1982) (Arabic= رياض الصالح الحسين) was a Syrian Poet from Daraa. Al-Hussein is considered to be one of the most influential pioneers of modern Arabic poetry and was known for his prose poems characterized with simple words and beauty.

== Early life ==
Riyad suffered from kidney problems, deafness, and diabetes throughout his brief lifetime. He underwent surgery at the age of 13 for his kidney which ultimately caused his deafness; he then went on a journey to Bulgaria to ease the symptoms of the botched surgery, then traveled back to Aleppo, then to Damascus. He published three poetry collections in his lifetime exploring themes of love, death, and war. Five months before his death, his last collection was published "Simple like Water, Clear like a Bullet" in 1982.

== Death ==
There is a lot of speculation concerning his early death. Riyad was known to be isolated and reserved by his friends. Syrian poet and artist Munther al-Masri, a close friend of Riyad's, alludes to the prospect of death brought on by heartbreak in an introduction to his complete collection of poetry. Al-Masri claims that two of Riyad's companions — Iraqi poets Mahdi Muhammad Ali and Hashem Shafiq — discovered him on the edge of death in his own room, shivering, hallucinating, and pleading for a sip of water, after growing concerned about his disappearance. They took him to Damascus' al-Muwasat Hospital, where he died on November 20, 1982, in the afternoon. His body was given to his Marae where he was buried. Munther claims he found a completed manuscript written by the poet which he published for his deceased friend approximately a year after his death. His poetry lives on as it somehow foresees the devastation in Syria today.

== Publications ==
- Circulatory Disorder (Kharab Aldawrat Aldamaweia), 1979
- Daily Legends ('Asatir Yawmia),1980
- Simple like Water, Clear like a Bullet, 1980
- Caribou in the Forest (Waeal Fi Alghaba), 1983
