= Khulood Al-Mualla =

Emirati poet

Khulood Al Mualla
- Born: Umm Al Quwain, United Arab Emirates
- Occupations: Poet, writer
- Writing career
- Language: Arabic
- Genre: Poetry

Khulood Al Mualla is an Emirati poet and writer. She is known for her prose poetry and a body of work translated into several languages, including Spanish, Turkish, English, Italian, French, Hindi and Russian.

== Early life and education ==
Al Mualla was born in Umm Al Quwain, United Arab Emirates, and moved to Ras Al Khaimah during her childhood, where she completed her early education. She received a bachelor's degree in architecture from United Arab Emirates University, a master's degree in project management from the University of Reading in the United Kingdom, and a bachelor's degree in Arabic language from Beirut Arab University.

== Literary career ==
Al Mualla published her first poetry collection, Here I Lost Time, in Cairo in 1997. It was followed by You, Alone in 1999, Ha' of the Absent in 2003, and Perhaps Here in 2008. Her later works include Without Being Quenched, a selection of poems published by Dubai Cultural magazine in 2011, Holding the Edge of Light in 2013, and I Am Content with Clouds.

Her poetry has often been discussed in relation to Sufi sensibility, philosophical reflection, and condensed imagery. In 2011, she appeared as a guest at the International Literature Festival Berlin.

In 2020, Al Mualla was chosen as an honorary member of the Casa de Poesía in Costa Rica and as an adviser to the International Poetry Festival held annually in San José.

== Works ==
- Here I Lost Time (هنا ضيّعت الزمن), Cairo, 1997
- You, Alone (وحدك), Cairo, 1999
- Ha' of the Absent (هاء الغائب), Beirut, 2003
- Perhaps Here (ربما هنا), Beirut, 2008
- Without Being Quenched (دون أن أرتوي), selected poems, 2011
- Holding the Edge of Light (أمسك طرف الضوء), 2013
- I Am Content with Clouds (وأكتفي بالسحاب)

== Translations ==
Selections from Al Mualla's poetry have appeared in Spanish, including Sin saciarme and Un cielo que merece la lluvia, translated by Amr Mohamed Said and published in Costa Rica. A selection of her poems was also translated into Spanish by Abeer Abdel Hafez under the title Al extremo de la luz.

Her poems were translated into Turkish by Mehmet Hakkı Suçin under the title Gülün Gölgesi Yok. Her work has also appeared in English translation.

== Awards and honours ==
- 2008 – Buland Al-Haidari Award for Young Arab Poets, Asilah Festival, Morocco.
- 2016 – Honoured in the Sheikh Mohammed bin Rashid Al Maktoum Peace Poets initiative.
- 2020 – Selected as honorary member of the Casa de Poesía in Costa Rica and adviser to the International Poetry Festival in San José.
