= Ahmad Al Shahawi =

Egyptian writer and poet

- Born: 1960 (age 65–66); Damietta, Egypt
- Education: BA in Journalism
- Alma mater: Manietta University
- Occupation: writer. journalist
- Awards: UNESCO Prize in Literature, 1995; Cavafy Poetry Prize, 1998

Ahmed Al Shahawi (Arabic:أحمد الشهاوي), an Egyptian poet and writer, was born in 1960. He has many poetry collections and books and novels on love and the philosophy of religion. He has won the UNESCO Prize in Literature in 1995 and the Cavafy Poetry Prize in 1998. His works have been translated into many languages including English, Dutch, French, Spanish and Turkish.

== Personal life ==
Ahmad Al Shahawi was born in northern Egypt specifically in Damietta on 12 November 1960. He lived in his city for five years before moving to a small village called "Kafr Al-Mayasrah" with his family to live there, where he completed his primary education. Then he moved to "Zarqa" and completed his preparatory and secondary studies. Years later, he studied at Masoura University in Damietta at the College of Education, in the Mathematics department for one year only, before moving to Journalism department in the Faculty of Arts in Sohag at Assiut University, where he graduated in 1983.

== Career ==
Al Shahawi started since he way young, as he used to write traditional poetry since he was in school. During his university studies, he participated in the journalism department in establishing the newspaper called "Sawt Sohag" which was edited by students of the journalism department at Assiut University, and he became the head of the cultural department. In April 1984, Al Shahawi joined the Egyptian army to perform his military service. A year later, he started working Al-Ahram newspaper in the news department before he assumed duties of editor-in-chief of the weekly magazine "Nisf Al-Dunya", which was issued by Al-Ahram Foundation in 1990. Then he became the editor-in-chief of the same magazine in 2000. Al Shahawi published his first poetry collection entitled "Two Rak'at for Love" in 1988, then his second book "Al Hadiths" was published in 1991. Moreover, because of his upbringing in a Sufi house of Azhari and his influence with the Sufi chanting culture, especially the Shadily Sufi, most of his poems are predominantly lyrical in nature and this appears clearly in his poetry collection "The Book of Death".

In 1991, Al Shahawi participated in the International Writing Program in the United States of America for a period of three months, and he was awarded a fellowship in literature from the University of Iowa, USA. Three years later, he obtained a special diploma in culture and science from he Ionic Center in Greece. Al Shahawi has been a member o the International Encyclopedia of Poetry Committee of the Supreme Council of Culture in Cairo from 2001 until 2006. He won the UNESCO Prize in Literature in 1995 and the Cavafy Poetry Prize in 1998, which is considered one of the most important prizes for poetry. In 2018, his poetry group "I Do Not Show Me" was nominated in the long list of the Sheikh Zayed Book Award in the branch of Literature.

== Awards ==
- 1995: UNESCO Prize in Literature
- 1998: Cavafy Poetry Prize
