= Nadia Al Najjar =

Emirati writer

- Born: United Arab Emirates
- Education: BA in computer science
- Alma mater: Ajman University
- Occupation: Writer
- Years active: 2014–present

Nadia Al Najjar (Arabic: نادية النجار) is an Emirati writer who published five short stories including "The Speckled Tiger", "I Am Different"; and three novels including "Cities of Passion" which won the first place in the Emirates Award for Fiction in the Short Fiction category in 2015. Her novel "Trio D" won the award for the Best Emirati Book by an Emirati Creative Writer at the Sharjah International Book Fair.

== Education and career ==
Nadia Al Najjar was born in the United Arab Emirates and currently lives in Dubai. She holds a Bachelor's degree in Computer Sciences from the University of Ajman of Science and Technology.

She has published five short stories for children including "I Am Different", "My Wondrous Picnic With My Uncle Salem" and "انيق وجهك Voices of the World". In 2014, she published her first novel "Mafa Al Thekrayat". A year later, she published her second novel "Cities of Passion" which won the first place in "Best Short Novel" of the Emirates Award for Fiction. Whereas, her novel "Trio D" won the award for the best Emirati Creative Writer at the Sharjah International Book Fair in 2017. Her short story "The Speckled Tiger" had been included in the UAE's Arabic Curriculum. In 2017, Al Najjar's short story "My Wondrous Picnic With My Uncle Salem" was shortlisted for category of Children's Literature of the Sheikh Zayed Book Award. She has participated in many literary events and festivals including the Emirates Airline Festival of Literature in 2018 and Abu Dhabi International Book Fair.

== Works ==
=== Novels ===
- Manfa Al Thekrayat, 2014
- "Cities of Passion" (Original title: Madaa’n Al Lahfa), 2015
- "Trio D" (Original title: Thulathiat Al Dal), 2017

=== Short stories ===
- "I Am Different" (Original title: Ana Mokhtalef), 2017
- "The Speckled Tiger" (Original title: Al Namir Al Alrqat), 2017
- "Voices of the World" (Original title: Aswat Al A’lam), 2018
- "My Wondrous Picnic with Uncle Salem" (Original title: Nozhati Al Ajeeba Ma’aa Al A’am Salem), 2019
- Ghaftan, 2019

== Awards ==
- 2015: Al Najjar's Novel "The Cities of Passions" won the first place in the Emirates Award for Fiction in the Short Fiction category.
- 2017: Her novel "Trio D" won the award for the best Emirati Book by an Emirati Creative Writer at the Sharjah International Book Fair.

== See also ==
- Lateefa Buti
- Hessa Al Muhairi
- Salha Obeid
- Maryam Saqer Al Qasimi
