= Minor Detail =

Minor Detail can refer to:

- Minor Detail (band), an Irish music band active in the years 1981–1987
- Minor Detail (novel), a 2020 novel by the Palestinian author Adania Shibli

== See also ==
- Minor Details, 2009 American film
