= Raife Salha =

Lebanese dressmaker and fashion designer

Raife Radwan Salha (Arabic: رئيفة رضوان صالحة; born 1925 or 1926 – died 1968), known professionally as Madame Salha, was a Lebanese fashion designer and the founder of "Dar Salha" (House of Salha), described as the first registered fashion house in Lebanon and the Middle East. She is widely credited as the first Lebanese woman designer to establish a maison de haute couture, and became known in the industry as the "Christian Dior of the Middle East".

== Early life ==
Madame Salha was born in 1926 in Aley, Mount Lebanon; (Note: Other sources gives her birth year as 1925.) she pursued an interest in dressmaking from childhood and married at the age of 15. Salha's mother made garments from fabric scraps, and Salha developed an interest in dressmaking as a child.

She began designing in the late 1940s, starting without formal training; she later said she had taught herself the craft. While in Paris, she worked briefly with couturiers such as Madame Grès and Pierre Balmain.

== Career ==
Madame Salha established her maison de haute couture in the 1950s, operating her atelier from Bechara El Khoury Street in downtown Beirut, near the now-defunct Gaumont Palace cinema. Her elaborately embroidered designs made her a favored designer among Beirut's upper-class families of the 1950s and 1960s, including the Halabi, Rabbat, Sursock, Khalil and Assaad families. By the 1960s, a single dress from her house could cost forty thousand Lebanese lira (around $13,500, adjusted for US inflation ≈ $150,000 in 2026). Salha gave individual names to her dresses to suit the woman who wore them; one dress made for Ghada Assaad, wife of the Speaker of Parliament, was named "Catherine," while others were named "One Thousand and One Nights" and "Most Beautiful of Beauties."

Salha also designed costumes for performers at the Baalbeck International Festival. She provided folkloric costumes worn by Fairuz and Sabah during festival performances.

Madame Salha's clients included the former Lebanese first lady Zalfa Chamoun, Soraya Soraya Esfandiary-Bakhtiary, Queen of Iran, Arab princesses from neighboring countries, and performers Samira Tewfik, Sabah and Samia Gamal. Umm Kulthum wore a Salha-designed gown while performing the song "Ya Msaharni," and Fairuz wore Salha's designs in the film Bayya' al-Khawatem (The Ring Seller), directed by Youssef Chahine. A 2012 article includes Salha, Hanna Touma and Pierre Katra among the early figures in Lebanon's modern fashion industry.

In 1961, Salha designed the wedding dress of Lamia al-Solh, daughter of former Lebanese prime minister Riad al-Solh, for her marriage to Prince Moulay Abdallah of Morocco. The dress featured a train measuring 22 meters, reported at the time as the longest in the world, and was covered in the German magazine Quick and France's Paris Match. The gown was embroidered with gold thread characteristic of Dar Salha and studded with pearls and semi-precious stones over silk duchesse satin. Salha also designed a traditional Moroccan kaftan for the princess, embroidered in gold on silk velvet and weighing more than 20 kilograms, which appeared on the cover of Paris Match in 1961. All of Madame Salha's garments, including this commission, were produced entirely by hand, without the use of sewing or embroidery machines.

Salha became known within the industry as the "Christian Dior of the Middle East". According to designer and fashion historian Joe Challita, the epithet "Christian Dior of the East" was specifically attributed to Madame Salha by François Lesage of Paris's Maison Lesage. Challita has also described her as having built a bridge between Beirut and Paris and as one of the first ten influential women in Lebanon.

== Personal life ==
Salha was known for hosting private parties at her home and for socializing at some of Beirut's most fashionable venues, including the nightclub Les Caves du Roy. She was frequently seen in the company of the singer Sabah, who also performed at private gatherings hosted by Salha.

== Death and legacy ==
Salha died in 1968 of a heart attack at the age of 42. At the time of her death, Salha was reportedly planning a collaboration with the Italian designer Valentino in Beirut. The Lebanese government posthumously awarded her the Lebanese Order of Merit, Knight rank, in recognition of her contribution to the craft of dressmaking. Al-Modon describes Dar Salha as Lebanon's first modern fashion house.
