= Salha Ghabish =

Emirati writer and poet

- Born: United Arab Emirates
- Education: United Arab Emirates University (B.A.); Cairo University (M.A.)
- Occupations: Writer, poet
- Years active: 1992–present
- Website: https://arab-business-gate.com/sg-writer/

Salha Ghabish (Arabic: صالحة غابش) is an Emirati writer and poet. She published four collections of poetry, one novel, and numerous short-story collections and books. She was awarded the "Distinguished Arab Women in Literature Award" from Sheikha Jawaher bint Muhammad Al Qasimi in 2008.

== Biography ==
Salha Ghabish is an Emirati writer and poet. She earned a BA in Islamic studies and Arabic language from the University of United Arab Emirates in 1987. In 1999, she earned her master's degree from the Faculty of Science at the University of Cairo. For many years, she worked as a teacher of mathematics and Arabic. Then, Ghabish became the secretary-general of the Supreme Family Council in Sharjah, and now she is the director general of Media and Cultural department in the Supreme Council for Family Affairs in Sharjah; and is a member of the Emirates Writers and Writers Union, and a member of the Emirates Literature Association as well. She is also the managing editor of the magazine "Marami", which is issued by the Council of the Supreme Family in Sharjah. She has published four collections of poetry, one novel and numerous books for children and young adults. In 2008, Ghabish was awarded the Distinguished Arab Women in Literature Award from Sheikha Jawaher bint Muhammad Al Qasimi, whereas in 2019, she received a "Shield of Excellence" from the Poetry House in Fujairah of the Fujairah Social and Cultural Society.

== Selected works ==
=== Poetry collections ===
- "Waiting for the Sun" (original title: bintethar al shams), 1992
- "Now I know" (original title: Al’an Araft), 1999

=== Novels and short-story collections ===
- "Ginger smell" (original title: Raehat al Zanjabeel), 2008
- "An Invitation Cards: Stories of a lost love" (original title: Betaqat Dawa: Kasasat min Hob Da’ee), 2016
- "Jawaher Bint Muhammad Al Qasimi .. A Journey of Hope and Humanity" (original title: Jawaher bint Muhammad Al Qasimi .. Rehla al Amal wa Al Insania), 2016

=== Children's books ===
- "Only … Break it" (original title: Ikserha baqat), 2015
- "Juha and the Screw" (original title: Juha wa al Mismar), 2016
- "The Two Friends" (original title: Al Sadeekatan), 2016
- "Pink and Blue" (original title: Wardi wa Azraq), 2016
- "I am the Emirati Rashid" (original title: Ana Rashid Al Emirati), 2016
- "Thank you, Dad" (original title: Shukran Baba), 2016

== Awards and honors ==
- 2008: awarded the Distinguished Arab Women in Literature Award from Sheikha Jawaher bint Muhammad Al Qasimi.
- 2019: received a “Shield of Excellence” from the Poetry House in Fujairah of the Fujairah Social and Cultural Society
