= Sharjah Book Authority =

Sharjah Book Authority (SBA) is a governmental entity, established in 2014 in Sharjah, United Arab Emirates. It operates in several sectors, under the literary umbrella; including publishing, printing, book translation, book festivals, and children's literature.

== History and development ==
The SBA was launched in 2014 by an Emiri decree of His Highness Sheikh Dr. Sultan bin Muhammad Al Qasimi, UAE Member of the Supreme Council and Ruler of Sharjah.

SBA participates in all international and regional book fairs like Frankfurt Book Fair, London Book Fair, Cairo International Book Fair, to name a few, and hosts numerous campaigns around the year to promote culture, literature, reading and the arts.

== Scope of work ==
SBA leads on several cultural projects and events in the UAE, including Sharjah Publishing City, Sharjah Libraries, Sharjah Children's Reading Festival (SCRF),Sharjah International Book Fair (SIBF) and Sharjah Book Fair – Translation Grant

SBA also organises the Publishers Conference as well as an annual joint conference with the American Library Association.

In May 2019, SBA launched a new event call the Emirati Book Fair, aimed at showcasing the literary history of the Persian Gulf region.

=== Sharjah International Book Fair (SIBF) ===
Sharjah International Book Fair is an 11-day international book fair held annually in Sharjah, United Arab Emirates. It was first launched in 1982, under the guidance and patronage of His Highness Dr. Sheikh Sultan bin Muhammad Al-Qasimi, the UAE Supreme Council Member and Ruler of Sharjah.

SIBF 2018 hosted 1,874 publishing houses from 77 countries, with 1.6 million titles on display, including 80,000 new titles. The fair welcomed 2.23 million visitors, who had access to 20 million books.

=== SIBF Translations Grant ===
Launched in 2011, on the occasion of the 30th annual Sharjah International Book Fair, the fund's monetary value is USD 300K. The Sharjah International Book Fair's Translations Grant Fund provides financial assistance to Arab and foreign publishers for the translation of different literary genres such as fiction, memoir, history, cookery, children's stories, adult's stories, poetry, and scientific books.

=== Sharjah Children’s Reading Festival (SCRF) ===
The Sharjah Children's Reading Festival was launched in 2010. Since then, it has grown to become a cultural event aimed at fostering a love of reading among children. The festival features a wide range of activities including workshops, readings, and interactive sessions designed to inspire young minds. The 2024 festival will feature over 1,400 cultural, artistic, and educational activities, with participation from 470 publishers from 75 countries.
