= Sultan Al Ameemi =

- Nasser bin Mohammed bin Fares Al-Far’aanah Al-Subaie
- Born: 1974 (age 51–52); Dhaid
- Education: Mohammed V University
- Occupation: Poet

Sultan Al Ameemi (Arabic: سلطان العميمي) (born 1974) is an Emirati writer. He was born in Al Dhaid in the UAE. He has published more than a dozen books, including short story collections, novels, and works of non-fiction. In 2014, he took part in the IPAF Nadwa workshop, where he began work on a novel titled One Room Is Not Enough. The novel was eventually nominated for the Arabic Booker Prize.

He writes a weekly culture column in the Al-Emarat Al-Youm newspaper.

== See also ==
- Abu Dhabi Authority for Culture & Heritage
- Million's Poet
- Nabati
