= Khalifa Award for Education =

Khalifa Award for Education is an educational award founded by Khalifa bin Zayed Al Nahyan, the President of the United Arab Emirates and the Ruler of Abu Dhabi. It includes all categories of those working in the field of education in the UAE and in the Arab world.

== See also ==
- Official website
