= Mohammed Bennis =

Moroccan writer

- محمد بنيس
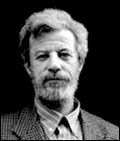
- Mohammed Bennis; Poet
- Born: 1948 (age 77–78); Fez, Morocco
- Education: Faculty of Letters and Human Sciences-Dhar Mehraz, Fez
- Occupation: Poet
- Writing career
- Language: Arabic
- Period: Modern
- Notable awards: 2002 Chevalier of the Ordre des Arts et des Lettres; 2007 Al-Oweis prize 2014 Max Jacob 'Étranger' Prize; 2017, Medal of Creation and Art by the president of Palestine, Mahmoud Abbas..

Mohammed Bennis (Arabic: محمد بنيس; born 1948) is a Moroccan poet and one of the most prominent writers of modern Arabic poetry. Since the 1970s, he has enjoyed a particular status within Arab culture. Muhsin J al-Musawi states that "Bennis’ articulations tend to validate his poetry in the first place, to encapsulate the overlapping and contestation of genres in a dialectic, that takes into account power politics whose tropes are special. As a discursive threshold between Arab East and the Moroccan West, tradition and modernity, and also a site of contestation and configuration, Muhammad Bennis' self-justifications may reveal another poetic predilection, too."

== Biography ==
Bennis attended Quranic School, joining a public primary school in 1958 at the age of ten. He became interested in literature from an early age, particularly lyric poetry.

He pursued his university studies in literature at the Faculty of Letters and Human Sciences, Dhar Mehraz, Fez, from where he graduated as a Bachelor of Arts in Arabic literature in 1972. At the Faculty of Letters and Human Sciences of the Mohammed V-Agdal University, Rabat, Bennis defended his PhD thesis, supervised by Abdelkebir Khatibi, on the Phenomenon of Contemporary Poetry in Morocco in 1978. In 1988, at the same faculty, he defended a second doctoral thesis, supervised by Jamel-Eddine Bencheikh, on Modern Arabic poetry, structures, and mutations.

Bennis published his first poems in 1968 in Al Alam newspaper in Rabat. In 1969, he sent his poems to the poet Adonis, who published them in the 9th issue of the Mawaqif poetry magazine. Ma Qabla al-Kalam (Before Words), Bennis’ first collection of poems, was published in 1969.

He settled in Mohammedia in 1972 where he taught Arabic language. Since 1980, he has been professor of modern Arabic poetry at the Faculty of Letters and Human Sciences of Rabat's Mohammed V-Agdal University. He has retired since 1 September 2016, after 44 years of teaching. He has since devoted himself to writing.

== Works ==
He is the Author of some forty books of poetry, prose, essays and translations —among them 16 poetry collections — and studies on Moroccan and modern Arabic poetry. Bennis has been published in numerous newspapers and reviews across the Arab world. Some of his poems and texts have been translated and published in collective works, reviews and newspapers, in Europe, the United States, and Japan. From 1995, his poetry collections and books have been translated and published into French, Spanish, Italian, Turkish, German and Macedonian. He also writes on painting. Some of his works have been realized by painters as books and folio volumes in Morocco, Europe, the United States, and Japan. Kitab al-Hobb (The Book of Love), which was published in 1994 with the Iraqi painter Dia Azzawi, is the story of a common adventure.

Open to hospitality and dialogue, Bennis has translated works from French. They include The Wound of the Proper Name (Abdelkebir Khatibi), The Rumor of the Air and other works of Bernard Noël, Tomb of Ibn Arabi, Les 99 Stations de Yale and The Malady of Islam (Abdelwahab Meddeb), A Throw of the Dice. (a poem of Stéphane Mallarmé, published in a bilingual edition, alongside Isabella Checcaglini and Bernard Noël, at Ypsilon Éditeur in Paris in 2007), and Archangélique by Georges Bataille in 2010. and As love As life, (selected poems) of Michel Deguy in 2018. Whilst at university, he translated French language texts into Arabic, and participated in Arabic and International poetry festivals.

He served on the judging panel for the 2008 International Prize for Arabic Fiction. And since 2013, he is member of the Scientific Committee of Sheikh Zayed Book Award.

== Poetry and language ==
Bennis has been concerned with the interrogation of Moroccan poetry and Arab culture in contemporary Morocco. Among his essays is one titled Hadathat al-Sou’al (Modernity of interrogation) (1985). This interrogation allowed him to open the way towards modernity and freedom, and became the mark of its poetics and cultural route. In time, it has also embraced poetry, culture, modernity and freedom.

Bennis' attitude to French culture is ambivalent; while he rejects the ideology of francophone policy (which for him represents a form of colonization), he holds the French language in high regard. "As a modern Arab poet, I am committed to French culture and its modernity. The French language was the home of a poetic revolution and it gave my Arabic language a poetic strength, more valuable than any of other modern languages." Thus, he is attached to the modernization of the language and to the freedom of expression based on the fundamental values of modernity. He has followed the tracks of "the poets who made of the human life, in its secrets as in its fears and its illuminations, their space of writing." His poetry, which grounds itself on the measure and the trance, is the creative union of two cultures: the ancestral Arabic culture between the Middle East, Andalusia, Morocco, and the international culture.

== Writing ==
Through the concept of writing, Bennis has become involved in a plural textual practice where language, subject and society are put in a movement. The first time he wrote about writing was in Bayan al-Kitaba (Manifesto of Writing)(1981). The concept refers to European (Friedrich Nietzsche, Stéphane Mallarmé, Jacques Derrida and Roland Barthes) and Arabic (Abou Tammam, Ibn Arabi, Andalusian-Maghrebian calligraphy and manuscripts) texts with the purpose of adapting them to his own ends. For Bennis, writing is a physical act; it is an orphan, because it "erases the myth of origin". Writing, he says, orients the language from the communicative function towards the reproduction of words and the interaction between words. It does so through a transfer of the construction's rules of the text on the one hand, and according to a replacement of the singular sense by the plural sense on the other. The writing is, in one of the definitions that Bennis gives, "a critic of the language, the subject and the society, established in the experience and the practice." "The writing's subject is material", though. It rises at the time of the practice, neither before nor later, and so it is "a liberating act" and a "sensual love opened on the life." In this way, writing abolishes the distance between "I, you, he and she". It "eludes the demarcation between poetry and prose", takes the passage opened between the different textual practices, devotes attention to "the appeal of place", and urges the reader to change his interaction with the poem, making his reading active.

From the concept of writing, Bennis grants an importance to his own composition of rhythm. It is a question of creating a dynamic lyric that places the body and the senses in the center of the poem. The forms of his poems and the perspectives which opened his poetic method give evidence of that. Bennis writes in this connection: "The construction of the poem, worked by the infinity of the subjectivity, by the stranger and the impure, undergoes unpredictable transformations. And so the poetic word, written in the margin of literature, does not stop destabilizing the syntax, diverting the image, decomposing the metrics and deforming the order, making itself clean and pure. The road of the poem is that of the impure where visible and invisible conjugate. This passage of the seed of drunkenness becomes a reality in the poem. And here is the impure to wear, from now on, the sign of the pure, the beautiful and the stranger."

This is a significant method in the modernization of the Arabic language and poetry. It is described by the English poet James Kirkup in a letter addressed to Mohammed Bennis: "You allow every word that enters yours poetic consciousness to achieve its full expressive force, and they all manifest themselves as true movements from the heart of poetry. You are like a wild bird that sings simply for the joy of singing. You are fascinated by the sound in every word that offers itself to each loving gesture of your poem that allows you to play with words and images echoing your thought, and so you fascinate your readers."

Kirkup adds: "You use poetic language as if it were some elemental matter which you carve as a sculptor does – the artist who, like a blind man, can feel beneath his chisel the forms he hammers from blocks of marble or granite. And you discover your poem-status without premeditation, by bringing to light and inscribing each line, each verse embedded in the rock of consciousness, in the dark of dreams."

In the same way, the Spanish poet, Antonio Gamoneda writes: "Mohammed Bennis, strange angel who enters in my veins and flows in them like the waters of the instants and you ignite the friendship of light: take me with you to the gardens of the dead, to the place of palms glimpsed between two fugitive abysses. Enter the hole of my chest and show me the gift of the void incandescent and the pupils of animals conceived in crying, those who come to the doors of intoxication to inject us with the passion of light, that substance which birds cross and makes us crazy in the happiness of the sweet contemplation of death."

== The poet in the city ==
Bennis testifies to the role of the poet in the city. In 1970, conscious of this role, he joined The Writers Union of Morocco and, in 1973, became a member of its executive board. He was, however, quick to object when he observed the influence of politics and subsequently left the association. In 1974, with Mostafa Mesnaoui, he founded the review Attakafa El Jadida (The new Culture) which played an active role in the cultural life in Morocco. The review was banned and closed down soon after its thirteenth issue by the Ministry of the Interior in January 1984 during riots in Casablanca. The ban caused him to take up the challenge and to create in 1985, with writers and academic friends Mohammed Diouri, Abdeltif Menouni and Abdeljalil Nadem, the Publishing house Dar Toubkal, with the aim of contributing to the modernization of Moroccan culture.

Bennis was also a founding member, with Mohammed Bentalha, Hassan Nejmi and Salah Bousrif, of the "House of Poetry in Morocco" in 1996, and was its president until 2003. Concerned about the international state of poetry, in 1998 he sent a call to Federico Mayor, chief executive officer of UNESCO, arguing for a World Poetry Day. Thanks to this initiative, on 15 November 1999, UNESCO declared 21 March to be World Poetry Day. Ten years later, when politicians seized the "House of Poetry in Morocco", he published an open letter titled "Fear of the Meaning", in which he denounced action against the freedom of poets and poetry. He was also one of the signatories of the Democratic Manifesto, published by Moroccan intellectuals on the occasion of the revision of the Moroccan constitution, in answer to the demand of the "Movement of February 20th".

== Presence ==
Since the 1970s, Bennis has participated in Arabic poetry festivals and, from 1980, in numerous international poetry festivals in Europe, Canada, the United States, Latin America, Turkey, China and India. Profiles of his work have appeared in Ars plus (an Albanian literary journal), al Shu'arae Review, The Poets (a quarterly cultural review of House of Poetry in Ramallah), and Banipal literary magazine. The Paris literary review Europe published an introduce dialogue with him in its issue 1015/1016, in November 2013.

At the same time, several days of studies has been dedicated to him by: "The Associations of Literary studies in Sfax" in Tunisia, 1991; "The lights's association of Sous for culture and art in Agadir", 1991; "The Association of Young Researchers in Language and Literature in Meknes", 2006; "The Association of Men of Literature of Morocco" in Rabat, 2006; "The Association of Mediterranean Culture in Tangier", 2007; "The French Institute" in Tangier, 2013; The Maghreb Association of Creation of Bouselem in Tunisia, 2014; The Book Festival in Marrakech, 2015; The Faculty of Letters and human studies in Rabat, 2015; The Arab Poetry Festival of Mehdia in Tunisia, 2016, The Assilah Forum Foundation, 2016, paid an international tribute to him. and The House of Poetry in Paris organized a poetic evening for him on 21 March 2017, World Poetry Day.

== Awards ==
- 1993: The Morocco Book award in 1993 for Gift of the Void.
- 2006: The Primio Calopezzati of Mediterranean literature for Fawzi Al Delmi's Italian translation of Gift of the Void (Dono Del Vuoto).
- 2000: Le Prix Grand Atlas of translation (Rabat) for his poetry collection Between Two Funerals, translated into French by Mostafa Nissabouri in 2003.
- 2007: Il Primeo Feronia International for literature (Italy).
- 2008: Al Owais Award (Dubai) for his whole poetic work.
- 2010: The Maghreb Culture Prize (Tunisia) in 2010.
- 2011: Premio Letterario Internazionale Ceppo Pistoia for Il Meditteraneo e la parola, published in 2009 in a translation by Francesca Corrao and Maria Donzelli.
- 2014: France's Max Jacob "Étranger" Prize.
- 2018: Prize of literary creation by the Arab cultural Circle in France.

== Distinctions ==
In France in 2002, he was awarded, the rank of Chevalier of the Ordre des Arts et des Lettres in France. He is also an honorary member of the World Haiku Association in Japan. In 2017, he has awarded the Medal of Culture, Creation and Art by the president of Palestine, Mahmoud Abbas.

== Publications in Arabic ==
- 1969: Makabla l-Kalam (Before words), (poetry);
- 1972: An al-ittéhad wa’l-farah (Something on Oppression and Joy), (poetry);
- 1974: Wajhou’n mouta’wahhijou’n abra imtidadi azzaman (The Eternally Incandescent Face), (poetry);
- 1979: Zahira ash-shi’r al-mu’asir fi l-Maghrib (The Phenomenon of the Contemporary Poetry in Morocco), (study);
- 1980: Fi Ittijah sawti’ka l-amoudi (Toward your Vertical Voice), (poetry);
- 1980: Al-Ism al-arabi’e l-jarih (The Wound of the Own Name) A. Khatibi (translation);
- 1985: Hadathat’u assou’al (The Modernity of Interrogation), (essay);
- 1985: Mawassim’ou al-sharq (Seasons of the East), (poetry);
- 1988: Warakatou l-baha’e (The Leaf of Splendor), (poetry);
- 1989–1991: Ash-sh’r al-Arabi l-hadith, biny’a touhou wa ibda’la’touha (Modern Arabic Poetry, Structures and Mutations), (study, 4 volumes);
- 1992: Hibatou l-faragh (Gift of the Void), (poetry)
- 1994: Kitabou l-houb (The Book of Love), (poetry) (poetic and artistic work in collaboration with the painter Dia Azzawi)
- 1994: Kitanba’tu l-Mah’ou’e (The Writing of Effacement), (Texts on poetry and modernity)
- 1995: Kitabou l-houb (The Book of Love), (poetry)
- 1996: Al- Makanou l-wathani (The Pagan Place), (poetry)
- 1996: Chataha't li’montassafi annahar (Trances for the Midday), (Texts)
- 1997: Al-Ghourfatou l-fa’righa (The Empty Room), (poetry), Jacques Ancet (translation)
- 1998: Hassissou l-hawa’e (Whisper of the Air), collected poetry collections of Bernard Noël (translation)
- 1998: Al-Oubou’r ila dhifa’f zarka’e (Crossing to the Blue Shores) (Texts)
- 1999: Nabidh (Wine) (two series of poems, bilingual edition: Arabic-French and Arabic-Spanish)
- 1999: Qa’br ibn Arabi yali’h aya’e (Tomb of Ibn Arabi Followed by 99 Stations of Yale), two poetry collections of Abdelawahab Meddeb (translation)
- 2000: Nahr’un bay’na jana’zatai’n (A River Between Two Funerals), (poetry)
- 2002: Al-A’amalou l-chi’ria (Poetry works), (2 volumes)
- 2002: Al-Islam assia’si (The Malady of Islam) of Abdelwahab Meddeb (translation collaborating with the author)
- 2004: Al-Hadatha l-ma’atouba (A Broken down Modernity) (cultural diary)
- 2006: Al- Haq fi Achi’ir (Right to Poetry) (essays)
- 2007: Hounaka tabk’a (Over There You Stay) (poetry)
- 2007: Rami’atou nard (A Throw of Dice), poem of Stéphane Mallarmé (translation)
- 2010: Al-Kodossi (The Archangélique), collection of poems of Georges Bataille (translation)
- 2010: Kalamou l-jassad (Speech of the Body),(Texts)
- 2011: Sab’atou touyour (Seven Birds), (poetry)
- 2012: Ma’a Asiqa’e (With Friends) (texts)
- 2012: Tari’kou l-midad (The Ink Path), collection of poems of Bernard Noël(translation)
- 2015: Hada al Azrak (This Blue) (poems)
- 2015: Kitabu l-nissian (The book of oblivion) essays of Bernard Noël (translation).
- 2015: Ha’da l- Azrak (This bleu) (poetry),
- 2017: Al-A’amalou l-nnath'ria (Prose works), (5 volumes)
- 2017: Daou’e al Atama't, Light of Obscurities (Selected poems).
- 2018: Andalous achoua'ra'e, The Andalusia of poets (Andalusian selected poems and prose).
- 2018: Ka’lhobb, k’alhayat (As love, as life), selected poems of Michel Deguy (translation).
- 2020: Yakada’tou Assa’mt (Awakening of silence) (poetry).

== Some translations in English ==
- 1985: Halim Barakat (ed.), Contemporary North Africa: Issues of Development & Integration, Center for Contemporary Arab Studies, Georgetown University.
- 1987: Salma Khadra Jayyussi (ed.), Modern Arabic Poetry: an anthology, New York: University Press.
- 1999: Tanure Ojaide and Tijan M. Sallah (eds), The New African Poetry: an anthology, Lynne Rienner Publishers, USA.
- 2001: Margaret Obank & Samuel Shimon (eds), A Crack in the wall: New Arab Poetry, London: SAQI Books.
- 2006: Soft Target, Jane Lewis, New York.
- 2008: Tina Chang, Nathalie Handal, and Ravi Shankar (eds) Language for a New Century: Contemporary Poetry from the Middle East, Asia, And Beyond, New York/London: W.W Norton & Company.
- 2011: Peter Cockelbergh (ed.), "Pierre Joris: an Arabic Islamic Turn in the poem & its thought" in Pierre Joris-Cartographies of the in-between, Prague: Univerzita Karlava.
- 2012: Poems of the Millennium, the University of California book of North African Literature, Volume Four, edited with commentaries by Pierre Joris and Habib Tengour, The Regence of the University of California.
- 2014: Arabic Poems, a bilingual edition, edited by Marlé Hammond, Everyman's Library, Alfred A. Knopf, New York, London, Toronto.
- 2017: Migrant Shores, Irish, Moroccan &Galician poetry, edited by Manuela Palacios, published by Salmon Poetry, Cliffs of Moher, country Clare, Ireland.
- 2019: A New Divan, A Lyrical Dialogue between East & West, Gingko Library, London.

== Further publications ==
- Banipal's Magazine Modern Arab Literature (London)
- Three Poems: Bells, The Road to Jerusalem, Between Silence and Sun poems, translated by Noel Abdulahad, 2, 56–57
- Poems from Hieroglyphics, Rose of Dust translated by Anton Shammas, 5, 21–24
- Subject of Mohammed Bennis, The free-floating anxiety of existence by Subhi Hadidi, 5, 22–23
- Selected Poems from The Gift of the Void: Doubts; Place; Silence; Frivolity; Impurity; Blindness; Trance; Lady; Palm; Wish, translated by James Kirkup, 5, 24–25
- 1945–2001 Zefzaf – a grand man of Moroccan and Arab letters 12, 26
- Desert on the brink of light translated by James Kirkup, 12, 56–59
- Ten poems: Faraway; A Blind Friend; Down there two Wingbeats; Perhaps; Fear; Apparition; Colours; One Drop; One Night and its Dead translated by James Kirkup, 19, 20–31
- Interviewed by Camilo Gomez-Rivas, 29, 114–23; Gift of the Void: Impossible; View; Path; Encounter; Writing; She; Straying; Shades; Safekeeping; Examining; Women; Elsewhere; Wavering; Words; Travel; Over There You Stay: Stones Alone; The Night of the Ruby: Tremor; Red Growing; Road of Fire; Creation; Lord of the Ruby; Surfaces; Storefront translated by Camilo Gomez-Rivas, 29, 124–37
- The power of his resistance translated by Youssef Rakha, 33, 53–55
- The Literary Review (USA) North Africa: Literary Crossroads, Vol. 41, No. 2, 1998
