= Basimah Yunus =

Emirati author (born 1964)

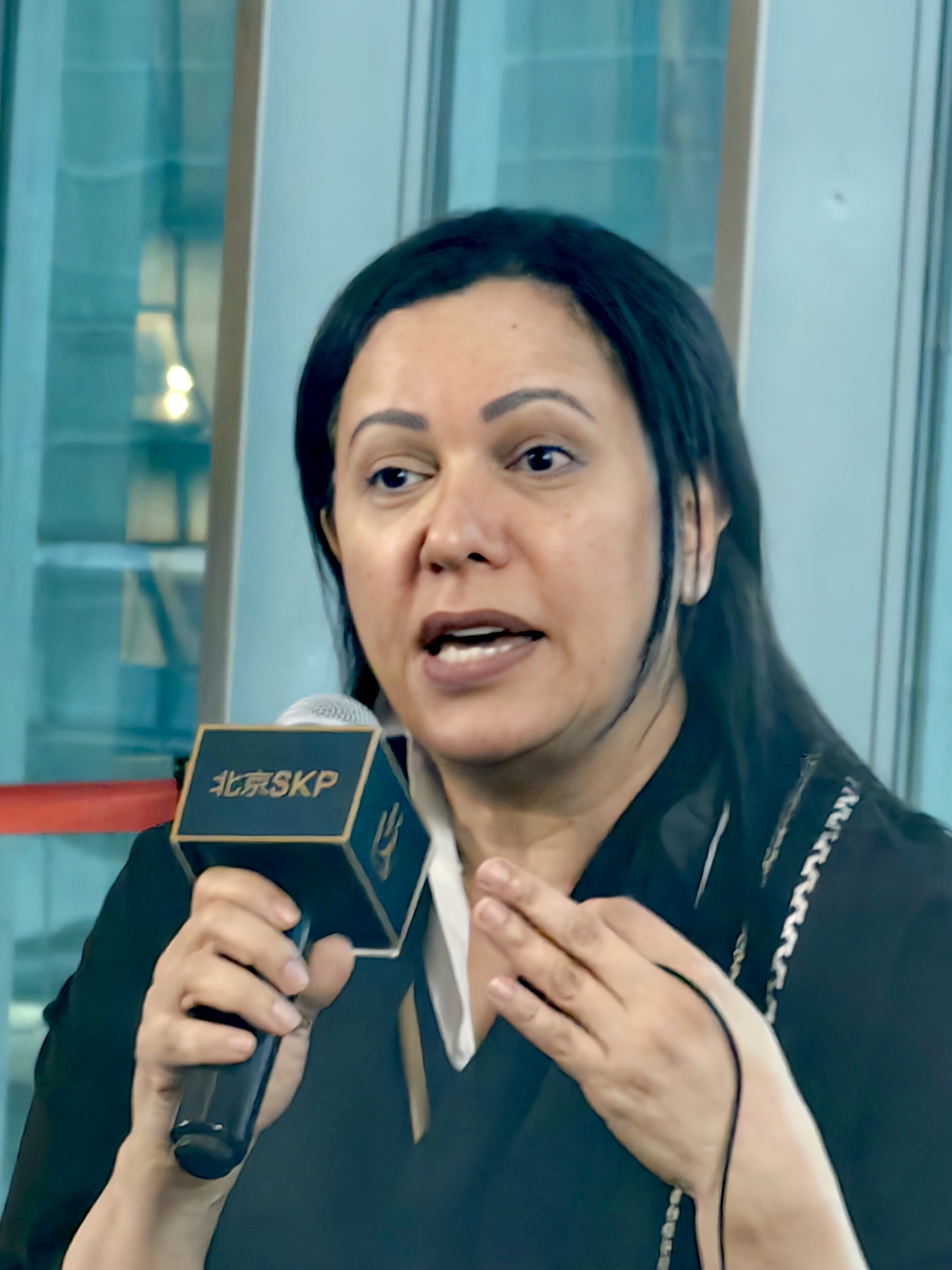
- Basimah Yunus in Beijing, June 2026
- Born: Basimah Muhammad Yunus; 1964 (age 61–62)
- Citizenship: United Arab Emirates
- Education: United Arab Emirates University; Beirut Arab University; University of Birmingham in Dubai; British University in Dubai
- Occupation: Writer
- Writing career
- Language: Arabic

Basimah Muhammad Yunus (Arabic: باسمة محمد يونس) is an Emirati author. She is recognized as a pioneering figure in UAE television and cinema, publishing numerous novels, short stories, and plays. In addition to her literary career, she is a multifaceted cultural figure. She lectures on a variety of cultural topics, produces television and radio programs, and writes for drama and radio. Her notable works include the programs and TV series Abi Afwan, Strange Names, From the Masterpieces of Stories, and Successful Women.

She is also an accomplished writer for children's and school theater, for which she has received numerous awards for her plays, stories, and novels.

== Education and career ==
Yunus obtained a bachelor's degree in education and English literature from the United Arab Emirates University in 1986, a Diploma in computer programming from the NCR Institute in Dubai in 1987, and a Bachelor's degree in Law from Beirut Arab University in 1993. She then earned a master's degree in Education Administration and Policy from the University of Birmingham in Dubai in 2008. In 2020, she obtained a PhD in Education, specializing in Educational Leadership and International Education Policy, from the British University in Dubai.

Yunus worked in a bank at the beginning of her career (1987-1992), before transitioning to teaching Arabic as a foreign language and English to Arabs (1992-1998). She become Assistant Professor of Arab Heritage at the American University of Sharjah (2010-2013), then worked at the Ministry of Culture and Knowledge Development until today, progressing through the ranks to her current position as Cultural Advisor. Yunus is an active member of numerous organizations, including the Emirates Writers Union, the Arab Writers Union, the Emirates Women Writers Association, and the Jurists Association. She is also a member of the Association of Teachers of English as a Second Language and a member of the Culture and Science Forum.

Yunus is the first woman to participate in writing a theatrical work in the Sharjah Theatre Days Festival since its inception.

== Works ==
=== Novels ===
- Angels and Demons, 1990
- Maybe It's You, 2010
- Until the End of the Month - January Tales, 2015
- Texts of Cruelty, 2018

=== Short story collections ===
- Agony, 1987
- Assassination of a Female, 1988
- A Way to Life, 1989
- Hajeer, 1993
- Undeclared Masculinity, 2000
- What If My Shadow Dies, 2004
- A Dangerous Relationship, 2006
- I Still Write and Erase, 2014
- Happy Death, 2016
- What No One Will Believe, 2018
- What No Mind Will Believe, 2018
- Planet 10, 2020

=== Drama (TV and Radio) ===
- Abi Afwan, TV series
- What If My Shadow Died?, Video film
- Assassination of a Dream, TV movie
- Strange Names, Radio program
- From the Masterpieces of Stories, Radio series
- The Last Cold Night, Play

=== Children's plays ===
- The Mother
- Hope and the Dolls
- Wonderland
- I am Creative Therefore I Exist
- Memories and Dreams

=== TV program ===
- Successful Women
- Creatives

== Awards ==
- Arab Women's Creativity Award, 2nd place, for the short story collection I Fly When I Dream.
- 1988: Emirates Writers and Authors Union Award, for the story Seeking Help.
- 1989: Arab Youth Club Award, 2nd place, for the story Advertisement.
- 1987: Abu Dhabi TV Award, 1st and 2nd place, for the stories The Tale of a Flower and The Auction.
- 1990: Ghanem Ghobash Short Story Award, for the story Word of Honor.
- 1991: Ghanem Ghobash Short Story Award, for the story Rebellion.
- 1992: Dr. Souad Al-Sabah Award for Intellectual and Literary Creativity among Arab Youth, for the collection Hjeer.
- 1992: Ghanem Ghobash Short Story Award, for the story Hamad Al-Warith.
- 1993: Ghanem Ghobash Short Story Award, for the story Good Evening, shared 3rd place.
- 1995: Ghanem Ghobash Short Story Award, for the story The Game of Refusal, shared 1st place.
- 1992: Abu Dhabi Ministry of Information and Culture Award, 3rd place, for the one-act play The Palm Tree.
- 1999: Competition Award Playwriting in the Arab World, Theatrical Writers Association, 1st place, for the play The Alternative.
- 2000: Short Story Competition Award, Al-Sada Magazine, UAE, 1st place, for the story The Dead Confess.
- 2000: Sharjah School Theatre Competition Award, 3rd place, for the play The Mother.
- Dubai School Theatre Competition Award, Dubai Shopping Festival, 1st place, for the text of the play Amal and the Dolls.
- 2001: Playwriting Competition Award, Theatrical Writers Association, UAE, 1st place, for the play Evening for Death.

== See also ==
- Afra Atiq
- Eman Al Yousuf
- Nadia Al Najjar
