= Sharjah International Book Fair =

Annual book fair in Sharjah, UAE

Sharjah International Book Fair معرض الشارقة الدولي للكتاب
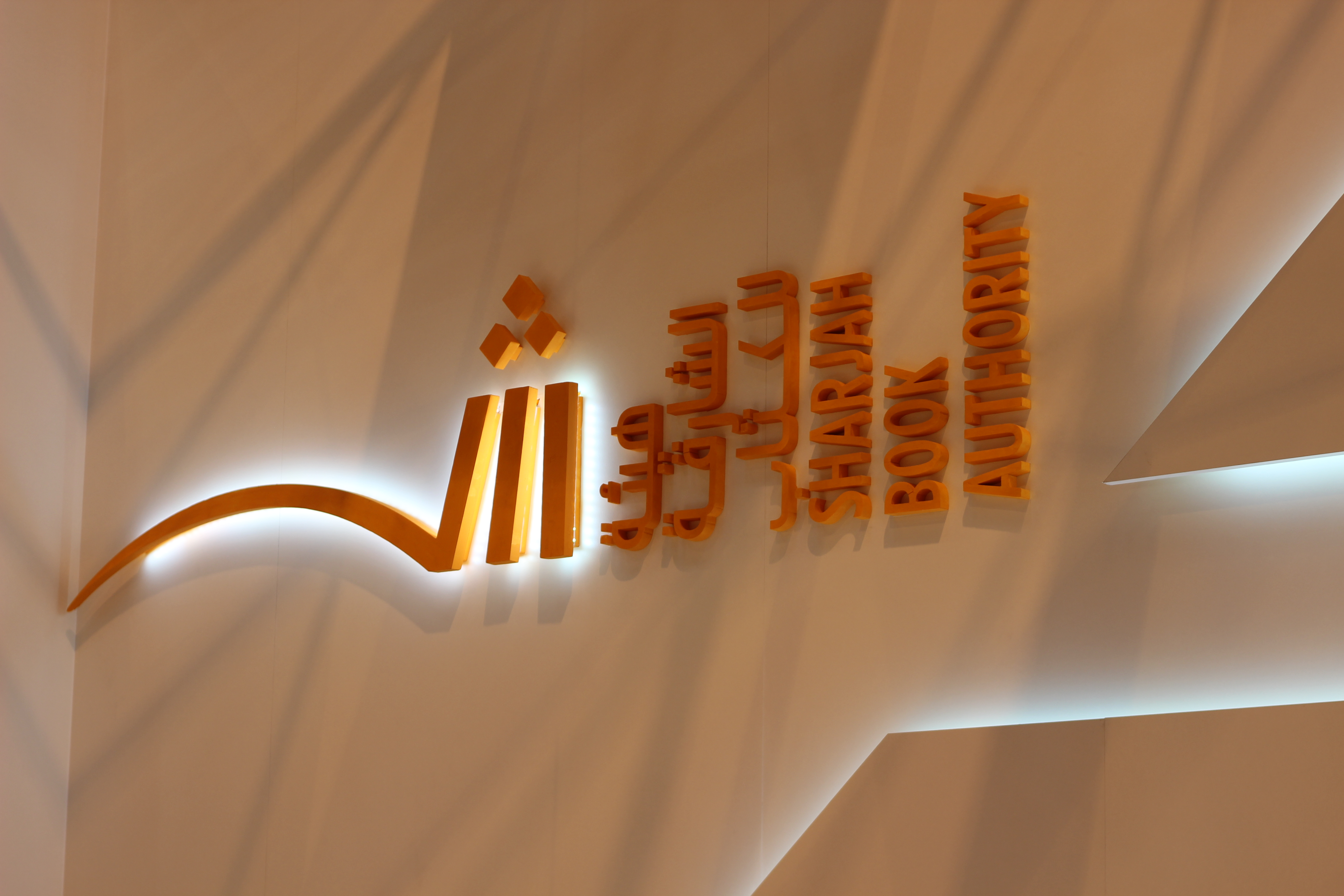
- Nickname: Sharjah Book Fair
- Status: active
- Genre: Fairs, festivals, conferences, exhibitions
- Frequency: Annually, in November
- Venue: Sharjah International Book Fair Centre
- Locations: Expo Centre Sharjah, Sharjah
- Country: United Arab Emirates
- Inaugurated: 1982; 44 years ago
- Founder: Sultan bin Muhammad Al-Qasimi
- Most recent: 15 November 2026
- Previous event: 4 November 2026–15 November 2026
- Next event: 2 November 2027–14 November 2027
- Attendance: 2.17 million visitors (2025).
- Budget: grant of AED 4.5 million
- Organiser: Sharjah Book Authority
- Website: www.sibf.com/en/home

Sharjah International Book Fair (SIBF) is a major annual literary and publishing event held in Sharjah, United Arab Emirates. As one of the world's largest book fairs, it hosted 2,200 exhibitors from 112 countries in 2026 and featured a broad range of activities throughout its 12 days.

The book fair debuted in 1982 under the guidance and patronage of Sheikh Sultan bin Muhammad Al-Qasimi, the UAE Supreme Council Member and Ruler of Sharjah.

== About ==
When the event was launched in 1982, it included a small number of publishers and the books were purchased by Sheikh Sultan Al-Qasimi.

The book fair acts as a platform to promote publishing and reading. As an event centred on the appreciation of literature, it brings together authors, publishers, thinkers, artists, academics and the general public.

== Events ==
Sharjah International Book Fair hosts a wide variety of activities, catering to diverse interests. In 2023, for example, more than 1,700 cultural, artistic and scientific events were organized, including an exhibition on the Portuguese presence in the Gulf during the 16th and 17th centuries, environmental awareness and bridge building workshops for children, library-centred discussions, and academic debates on comparative knowledge sources. Initiatives at the fair encompass:

=== Book signings ===
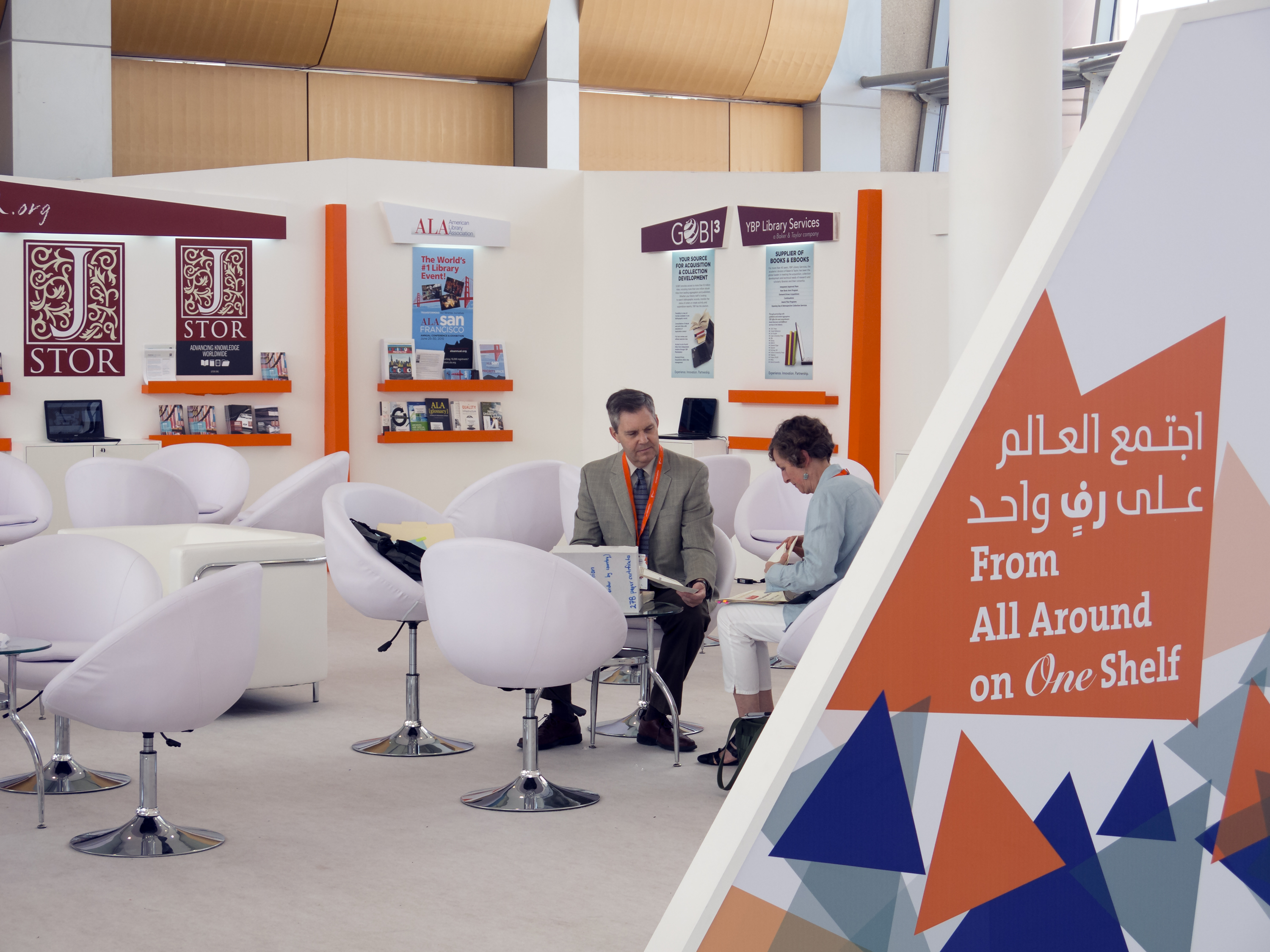
Sharjah International Book Fair - 2014

Book signings represent a central theme. In 2023, under the headline "We Speak Books", the event aimed to gather 600 authors from around the world, to sign their new books.

=== Panel discussions ===
SIBF hosts a number of panel discussions every year, bringing a wide range of speakers from all kinds of fields and covering many different topics.

=== Workshops ===
Focusing on publishing, culture, art and creativity, the book fair organizes a variety of workshops. In 2023, alongside activities centred on historical, environmental, creative and professional themes, the fair planned to host 60 illustrator-led workshops focused on comics, manga and anime.

=== Performances ===
In its celebration of culture, Sharjah International Book Fair serves as a venue for music and theatre. In 2023, the fair hosted 130 theatrical performances, including an Emirati-made play titled Barcode Prison.

== Awards at the Book Fair ==
Sharjah International Book Fair presents awards for titles across different topics and themes, with winners honored by Sheikha Bodour Bint Sultan Al Qasimi, Chairperson of the Sharjah Book Authority. The award categories are as follows:

- Best Emirati Novel
- Best Emirati Academic Book
- Best Emirati Creative Literature Book
- Best Emirati First Novel
- Best Arabic Novel
- Best International Fiction Book
- Best International Non-Fiction Book
- Best Arab Publisher
- Best International Publisher

The Etisalat Award for Arabic Children's Literature is also presented at the book fair, with categories that include:

- Early Reader
- Picture Book
- Chapter Book
- Young Adult's Book
- Poetry

== Sharjah International Book Fair Translation Grant ==
Launched in 2011, the Sharjah International Book Fair Translation Grant aims to foster the exchange of literary titles by supporting the translation of Arabic literature into foreign languages and vice versa. With an annual fund of US$300,000, grants of up to US$4,000 are available for general titles, and US$1,500 for children's titles. The program has supported the translation of more than 500 books, benefiting publishers such as Arab Scientific Publishers in Lebanon, the American University in Cairo Press, Mexico's Textofilia Ediciones and Book Art Nepal. As of the 13th edition of the fund at the 2024 book fair, just over 2,500 applications had been submitted, nearly half of which were received at the 13th SIBF Publishers Conference held in October 2023.

== Sharjah Publishers Conference ==
The book fair is preceded by a three-day Publishers Conference, facilitating matchmaking for the buying and selling of publishing and translation rights. It also organizes roundtable discussions and workshops on topics including freedom of expression, artificial intelligence, audio formats, and market growth. At its latest iteration, held from 3 to 5 November 2024, nearly 1,150 publishers and literary agents from 108 countries attended, alongside authors and expert speakers.
