= Maryam Saqer Al Qasimi =

Emirati writer

- Born: United Arab Emirates
- Education: BA in mass communication; MA in Translation
- Alma mater: American University of Sharjah
- Occupation: Writer
- Years active: 2016–present
- Awards: The short story "Where Did the Letters Disappear?" won the Sharjah Children's Reading Festival Award, 2018

Maryam Saqer Al Qasimi (Arabic: مريم صقر القاسمي) is an Emirati writer for children and young adult. She published eight children short stories. Her short story "Where Did the Letters Disappear?" won the Sharjah Children's Book Award in the category of young readers in English language, 2018. Later, the story was adapted into a musical play.

== Education and career ==
Maryam Saqer Al Qasimi was born and raised in the United Arab Emirates. She obtained her bachelor's degree in mass communication from the American University of Sharjah and has master's degree in translation from the same university. Al Qasimi started writing from a young age; yet, she published her first work in 2016 which was "The Curious Adam". So far, she published eight short stories including "Completed Together", "Where Did the Letters Disappear?", "The Wise Man of the Arabs", "Maryam and the Pen", "Diversity" and "The Water Seller". In 2018, Al Qasimi's short story "Where Did the Letters Disappear?", which was published by Medad Publishing and Distribution, won the Prize for Young Children's Literature at the 10th edition of the Sharjah Children's Reading Festival Award; later, the story was adopted into a musical play. In 2020, her story "The Water Seller" was shortlisted for the Sheikh Zayed Book Award in the category of Children's Literature. Al Qasimi is also a columnist at Al Roeya Emirati Newspaper.

== Works ==
- The Curious Adam, 2016
- Completed Together (original title: Motakamileen Ma'an), 2017
- Where Did the Letters Disappear (original title: Ain Ikhtafat Al Houroof?), 2018
- The Wise Man of the Arabs (original title: Hakim Al Arab), 2018
- Maryam and the Pen (original title: Maryam wa Al Qalam), 2019
- The Water Seller (original title: Saqi Al Maa), 2019
- Diversity, 2019

== Awards and honors ==
- 2018: The short story "Where Did the Letters Disappear?" won the International Children's Book Award at the 10th edition of the Sharjah Children's Reading Festival.
- 2020: The story "The Water Seller" was shortlisted for the Sheikh Zayed Book Award in the category of Children's Literature.
