= United Arab Emirates University =

Public research university in Al Ain, United Arab Emirates

- جامعة الإمارات العربية المتحدة
- Type: Public research university
- Established: 7 July 1976; 50 years ago
- Chancellor: Zaki Nusseibeh
- Vice-Chancellor: Ahmed Ali Alraeesi
- Provost: Mohsen Sherif
- Undergraduates: 18000
- Postgraduates: 1800
- Location: Al Ain, United Arab Emirates; 24°12′1″N 55°40′34″E
- Campus: 296 acres (120 ha).; Midsize city
- Website: uaeu.ac.ae

United Arab Emirates University (UAEU) (Arabic: جامعة الإمارات العربية المتحدة) is a public research university located in Al Ain, United Arab Emirates. Founded in 1976 by the country's first President, Sheikh Zayed bin Sultan Al Nahyan, it is the oldest university in the United Arab Emirates and offers courses in various subjects up to graduate school.

== History ==
The United Arab Emirates University was established through the Federal Law No. (4) issued by Sheikh Zayed bin Sultan al-Nahyan, President of the United Arab Emirates in 1976.

== Location ==
The university is located in the city of Al Ain, an oasis city in the Abu Dhabi emirate 140 km east of the capital city of Abu Dhabi and a similar distance from the city of Dubai.

== Students ==
Students come from all seven Emirates and more than 81 other countries. 6,696 students live on campus. In 2024 enrolled international students constituted 19% of the total enrolled students.

== Rankings ==
University rankings

Global – Overall
- ARWU World: 701–800 (2025)
- QS World: 229 (2026)
- THE World: 251-300 (2025)
- USNWR Global: =333 (2025)

The United Arab Emirates University is continuously ranked among the top universities in the United Arab Emirates and 5th in the Arab region, the 217th in the world in the 2027 QS World University Rankings. In the 2021 QS Top 50 Under 50, i.e. the top 50 world universities that were founded within the past 50 years, UAEU was ranked number 27.

In its capacity as a business school, UAEU was placed as the third best business school in Africa and the Middle East in the 2010 QS Global 200 Business Schools Report. As a research university the UAEU is ranked as number one in the GCC countries, number two in the Arab World, and ninth in the Muslim world. As of 2026, the university is ranked 248th globally according to Times Higher Education.

== Structure ==
The Vice-Chancellor is responsible for the management of the university as well as policy and strategic planning, budget and financial activities, external relations, and alumni. The Provost is the Chief Academic Officer responsible for the Colleges, undergraduate studies, research and graduate studies, and information technology. He is assisted by the Deputy Provost. The Secretary General is responsible for services including finance, budget, facilities management, human resources, auxiliary services, and safety. The Deans are the heads of the academic colleges, which are groupings of academic disciplines, through which the academic staff teach at undergraduate and post graduate levels, and conduct research and scholarship.

The UAEU has undergraduate and postgraduate degree programs in nine colleges:

- College of Business and Economics
- College of Education
- College of Engineering
- College of Agriculture and Veterinary Medicine
- College of Humanities and Social Sciences
- College of Information Technology
- College of Law
- College of Medicine and Health Sciences
- College of Science

Graduate degrees are granted by the College of Graduate Studies. There are more than 86 programs offered, including master's and doctoral degrees in several subjects. The University Foundations Program prepares students for academic degree programs with pre-university courses in English, Arabic and Mathematics and other support in making the transition from school to university.

In addition to undergraduate and graduate programs, the UAEU conducts continuous education courses and vocational certificates for the community across all disciplines and hosts the Emirates Health Services, which provides medical skills training.

== Faculty ==
- Ibrahim Galadari, professor and dermatologist

== Symposiums ==
=== Biological Sciences ===
In November 2016, the University held its first ever symposium on Biological Sciences "GENOMICS & BIOINFORMATICS" attended by experts from different parts of the world.

== Research ==
The university launched the first PhD program at a national university in the UAE. As a research institution it attracts national, international, and industrial grants. PhD programs and professional doctorate degrees cover a range including Pharmacy, Public Health, and a Doctorate of Business Administration.

The university hosts research centers including the Zayed Center for Health Sciences and the National Water Center.

== Internationalization ==
UAEU has enacted partnerships with other higher education institutions across the world. In May 2026, a delegation led by Vice-Chancellor Professor Ahmed Ali Al Raeesi visited the Education University of Hong Kong and explored possibilities of student mobility, joint research and other potential collaboration between the institutions.

== Notable faculty ==
- Tariq Najm, Iraqi politician

== Notable alumni ==
- Mansour bin Zayed Al Nahyan, deputy prime minister and minister of presidential affairs of the United Arab Emirates
- Saif bin Zayed Al Nahyan, minister of interior and deputy prime minister of the United Arab Emirates
- Abdullah bin Zayed Al Nahyan, minister of foreign affairs of the United Arab Emirates
- Hamdan bin Mubarak Al Nahyan, minister of Higher Education and Scientific Research of the United Arab Emirates
- Hamdan bin Zayed Al Nahyan, former minister of foreign affairs of the United Arab Emirates and former deputy prime minister
- Ahmed bin Zayed Al Nahyan, former managing director of Abu Dhabi Investment Authority, was regarded as the 27th most powerful person in the world by Forbes in 2009 before his death
- Shaykha al-Nakhi, pioneering female short story writer
- Maryam Al Roumi, minister of social affairs of the United Arab Emirates and the second woman to hold a cabinet post in the history of United Arab Emirates, listed among top 10 most powerful Arab women in government by Forbes
- Saqr Ghobash, minister of labour of the United Arab Emirates and former ambassador to the United States of America and Mexico
- Abdul Rahman Al Oweis, minister of health in the United Arab Emirates
- Fatima Al Jaber, first woman to be elected to the Abu Dhabi Chamber of Commerce board of directors in December 2009. As of 2014, she is listed as the 94th most powerful woman in the world by Forbes
- Amal Al Qubaisi, first woman to be elected to the UAE’s Federal National Council, first woman appointed to Abu Dhabi Executive Council
- Najla Al Qassimi, UAE's first female ambassador, ambassador of the United Arab Emirates to Portugal, former ambassador to Sweden
- Essa Al Basha Al Noaimi, ambassador of the United Arab Emirates to the Islamic Republic of Pakistan
- Salma Hareb, Chief Executive Officer at Jafza (Dubai free zone), the first female in the Middle East and North Africa to be appointed head of an economic free zone, ranked as the 2nd most powerful Arab woman in government by Forbes
- Mariam Al Mansouri, first woman to fly combat fighters in UAE
- Noura Al Kaabi, minister of culture and knowledge development
- Abdul Qader Al Rais, Emirati artist
- Khadem Al Qubaisi, Emirati businessman and the former managing director of the International Petroleum Investment Company (IPIC).
- Aisha al-Ghais, poet and storyteller

== See also ==
- List of Islamic educational institutions
- List of schools in the United Arab Emirates
- List of universities in the United Arab Emirates
- Education in the United Arab Emirates
- University of Wollongong in Dubai
