= History of Egypt under Gamal Abdel Nasser =

Period of Egyptian history from 1952 to 1970

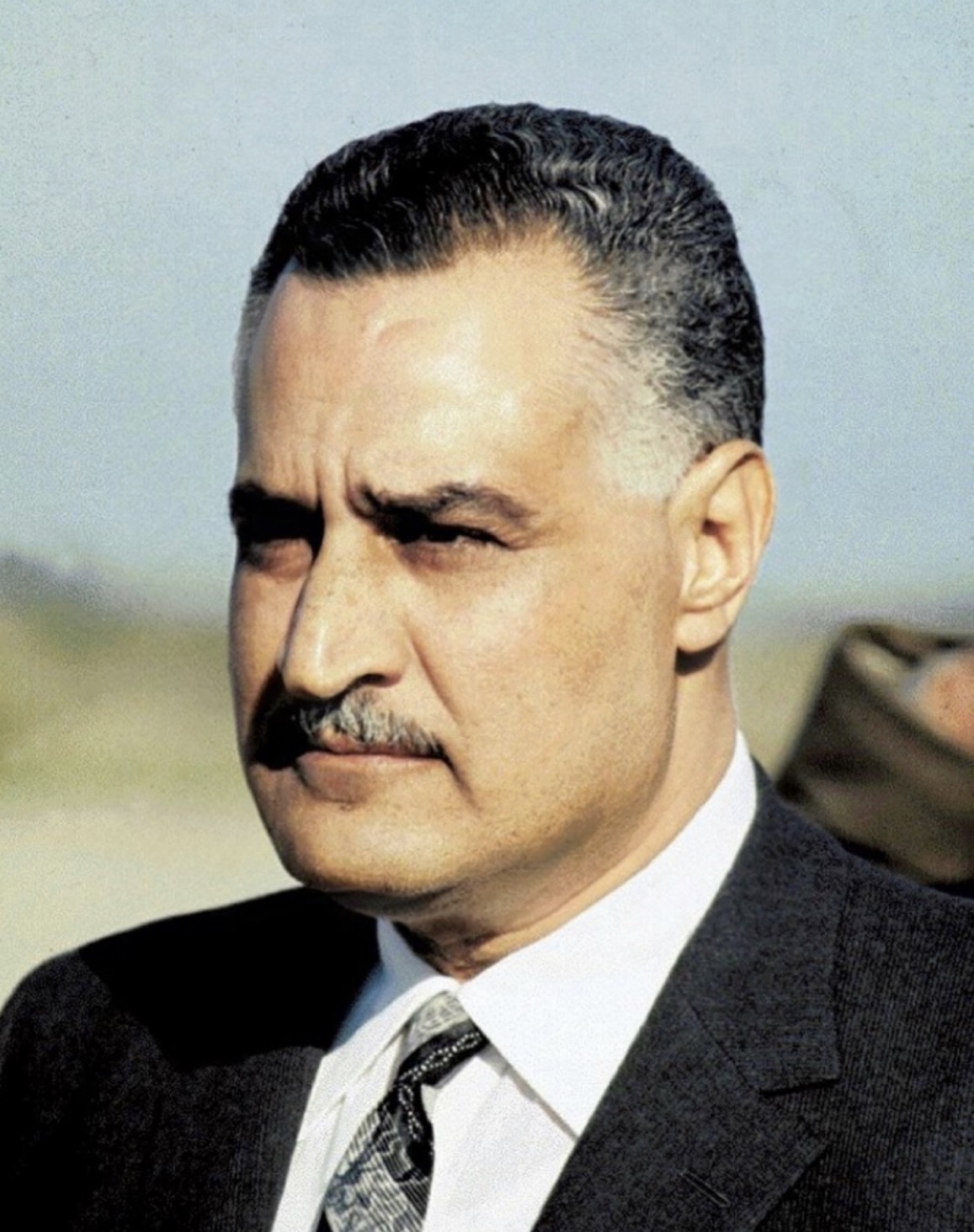
President Gamal Abdel Nasser in 1969

The history of Egypt under Gamal Abdel Nasser covers the period of Egyptian history from the Egyptian Revolution of 1952, of which Gamal Abdel Nasser was one of the two principal leaders, spanning Nasser's presidency of Egypt from 1956 to his death in 1970. Nasser's tenure as Egypt's leader heralded a new period of modernisation and socialist reform in Egypt, along with a staunch advocacy of pan-Arab nationalism (including a short-lived union with Syria), and developing world solidarity. His prestige in Egypt and throughout the Arab World soared in the wake of his nationalisation of the Suez Canal Company in 1956, and Egypt's political victory in the subsequent Suez Crisis, but was damaged badly by Israel's victory in the Six-Day War.

The era witnessed a rapid increase in living standards unparalleled in Egypt's millennia of history, and is regarded as a time when ordinary Egyptian citizens enjoyed unprecedented access to housing, education, employment, healthcare, and nourishment, as well as other forms of social welfare, while the influence of the former aristocracy waned, as did that of the Western governments that had hitherto dominated Egyptian affairs.

The national economy grew significantly through agrarian reform, major modernisation projects, such as the Helwan steel works, and the Aswan High Dam, and the nationalisation of key parts of the economy, notably the Suez Canal Company. At its economic peak, Nasser's Egypt was capable of not only offering free education and healthcare to its own citizens but also to the citizens of other Arab and African countries, who were offered full scholarships and living allowances to undertake higher education in Egypt before returning to their home countries. However, the substantial economic growth that marked the early 1960s took a downturn later in the decade, particularly as Egypt's military quagmire in the North Yemen Civil War deepened, only recovering in the late 1970s.

During Nasser's time in office, Egypt experienced a golden age of culture, particularly in theatre, film, poetry, television, radio, literature, fine arts, comedy, and music. Egypt under Nasser dominated the Arab World in these fields, with Egyptian musical artists such as Abdel Halim Hafez, Umm Kulthum, and Mohammed Abdel Wahab, literary figures such as Naguib Mahfouz, and Tawfiq el-Hakim, actors such as Faten Hamama, Salah Zulfikar, Soad Hosny and Rushdi Abaza, and the release of over 100 films yearly, compared to the production of just more than a dozen annually during Hosni Mubarak's presidency (1981–2011).

== Republic of Egypt (1953–1958) ==
=== Egyptian revolution of 1952 ===
On 22–26 July 1952, the Free Officers, a group of disaffected officers in the Egyptian army founded by Gamal Abdel Nasser and headed by General Muhammad Naguib, initiated the Egyptian Revolution of 1952 which overthrew King Farouk, whom the military blamed for Egypt's poor performance in the 1948 war with Israel and lack of progress in fighting poverty, disease and illiteracy in Egypt. The monarchy of Egypt and Sudan was gone without "a voice" being "raised" in its favour. In the following two years, the Free Officers consolidated power. Popular expectations for immediate reforms led to the workers' riots in Kafr Dawar on 12 August 1952, which resulted in two death sentences. Following a brief experiment with civilian rule, the Free Officers abrogated the 1953 constitution and declared Egypt a republic on 18 June 1953, Muhammad Naguib as Egypt's first President. Within six months all civilian political parties were banned replaced by the "Liberation Rally" government party, the elites seeing a need for a "transitional authoritarianism" in light of Egypt's poverty, illiteracy and lack of a large middle class.

=== Suppression of the Muslim Brotherhood ===
In January, the large Muslim Brotherhood organization was outlawed, remaining an illegal political organization until the Revolution of 2011. The move came in the wake of clashes between members of the Brotherhood and Liberation Rally student demonstrators on 12 January 1954. On 26 October, an assassination attempt suspected by the Brotherhood was directed at Nasser during a rally in Alexandria. This led to the regime acting against the Brotherhood, executing Brotherhood leaders on 9 December.

=== Presidency of Nasser ===
Gamal Abdel Nasser first became prime minister in February 1954. He was chairman of the Revolutionary Command Council from November 1954 until he became President of Egypt in 1956, and served as president until his death in 1970.

=== 1956 ===
Meanwhile, the RCC, morally backed by both the Soviet Union and the United States, managed to remain united in its opposition to the British and French, specifically in regard to the Suez. Despite continued calls from the RCC, in debates in the United Nations, and pressure from both the US and USSR, the British refused to transfer control of the Canal to the new regime. The RCC began funding and coordinating ever greater attacks on the British and French in the Suez and Damietta. Finally, on 19 October, Nasser signed a treaty for the evacuation of British troops from Egypt, to be completed over the following 20 months. Two years later, on 18 June 1956, Nasser raised the Egyptian flag over the Canal Zone, announcing the complete evacuation of British troops.

=== New Constitution ===
President Nasser announced a new Constitution on 16 January 1956 at a popular rally, setting up a presidential system of government in which the president has the power to appoint and dismiss ministers. An elections law was passed on 3 March granting women the right to vote for the first time in Egyptian history. Nasser was elected as the second president of the Republic on 23 June. In 1957, Nasser announced the formation of the National Union (Al-Ittihad Al-Qawmi), paving the way to July elections for the National Assembly, the first parliament since 1952.

== Economy and society ==
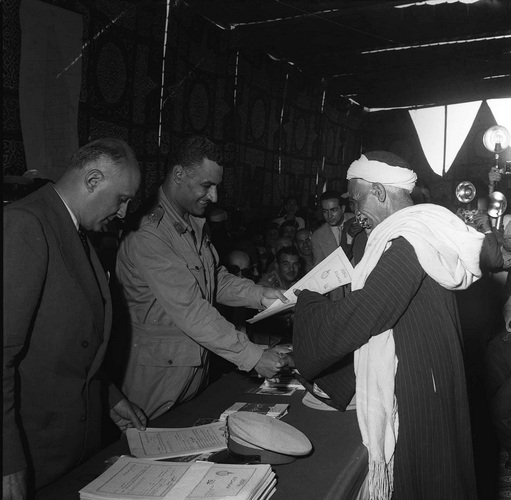
Nasser handing documents to an Egyptian fellah in a land distribution ceremony in Minya, 1954

=== Land reform ===
The original revolutionaries wanted an end to British occupation but did not have a unified ideology or plan for Egypt. One issue that was agreed on and acted quickly on was land reform. Less than six percent of Egypt's population owned more than 65% of the land in Egypt, while at the top and less than 0.5% of Egyptians owned more than one-third of all fertile land. the process of land reform began on September 11, 1952, when (among many provisions) a law prohibited ownership of more than 200 feddans of land (840000 sq meters); limited the rental rate for land; established cooperatives for farmers; minimum wages, etc.

During the presidency of Nasser, cultivated land in Egypt increased by almost a third (an achievement that had reportedly eluded Egyptians for more than a millennium).

=== Economy ===
Egypt's economy grew at an average rate of 9% per annum for almost a decade. The share of manufacturing to Egypt's GDP rose from around 14% in the late 1940s to 35% by the early 1970s.

"The combination of the land-reform programme and the creation of the public sector in Egypt resulted in around 75% of Egypt's gross domestic product (GDP) being transferred from the hands of the country's rich either to the state or to millions of small owners. The closest parallel to such a large-scale social programme had been in the early days of Mohamed Ali Pasha's rule in the early nineteenth century."

=== Departure of Mutamassirun from Egypt ===
The departure of foreign residents, primarily from European and Levantine communities, accelerated under Nasser's rule. These communities consisting of British, French, Greeks, Italians, Armenians, Maltese and Jews had been established in Egypt since the 19th century. This group of foreign nationals became known as the "Egyptianized", or the Mutamassirun. The rise of Egyptian nationalism under Gamal Abdel Nasser, following the Nakba, the Palestine War, Lavon Affair and the Suez War, placed heavy discontent towards the Mutamassirun, particularly the British, French, and Jews, as a colonial class.

Some 23,000—25,000 Jews out of 42,500 in Egypt were expelled, mainly for Israel, Western Europe, the United States, South America, and Australia. Many were forced to sign declarations that they were voluntarily emigrating and agreed to the confiscation of their assets. Similar measures were enacted against British and French nationals in retaliation for the invasion. Egyptian nationality law was amended to disqualify Jews and other minorities from having Egyptian citizenship. By 1957 the Jewish population of Egypt had fallen to 15,000.

== Foreign affairs ==
Egypt's nationalisation of the British-owned Suez Canal was a great victory for Nasser who was celebrated as both an Egyptian hero and an Arab one, capable of 'defeating the nation's enemies' and 'representing Arab dignity'." Chinese premier Zhou Enlai called Nasser 'the giant of the Middle East.'

Nasser emerged as one of the architects of the Non-Aligned Movement, which was founded in 1961 as a bloc of 'independent nations' detached from both NATO and the Warsaw Pact. Almost all African anti-colonialist freedom fighters came to him for guidance, moral support and funds.

=== Opposition to Baghdad Pact ===
A major reason why conservative Arab regimes felt threatened by Nasser during his first years in power was that his popularity had been demonstrated – even before the Suez crisis – when he became a leading critic of the 1955 Baghdad Pact. The Baghdad Pact was initially an alliance between Iraq and Turkey, which Britain supported with the goal of strengthening its power within the Middle East. Nasser considered the Baghdad Pact to be part of a British effort to split the Arab countries into differing groups, and to divide the region by escalating tension between them. The British later attempted to bring Jordan into the Baghdad Pact in late 1955 after Nasser agreed to purchase arms from Czechoslovakia in the Soviet bloc. The British were determined to bring Jordan into the Baghdad Pact and to apply pressure to try to force Jordan to join. Nasser had opposed the Baghdad Pact, and his successful effort to prevent Jordan from joining the pact is an example of his pragmatic diplomatic strategy. Nasser's pragmatism towards Jordan meant that he aimed to force the Jordan regime to decline to join the pact, but he did not himself attempt to overthrow the regime. This stance was rewarded with Jordanian support for Egypt during the Suez Crisis the following year in 1956.

The dispute over Jordanian membership in the Baghdad Pact lasted from November to December 1955. Nasser's goal was based on Egyptian national interests – he wanted to prevent Jordanian membership in the Baghdad Pact, which was more important to him than the fate of the Jordanian regime. He was thus prepared to offer the Jordanian regime a way out in which it could survive if it did not join the pact. Nasser's strategy during the debate over the Baghdad Pact was to apply rhetorical pressure using Egyptian propaganda to launch broadcasts attacking the British, and also warning the Jordanian regime that it could be overthrown if it agreed to join the pact. The Egyptian propaganda led to riots occurring in Jordan in December 1955 during a visit of British Field Marshal Gerald Templer, who was serving as the British Defence Chief of Staff.

The nature of the message that Egyptian propaganda conveyed during the crisis over Jordanian accession to the Baghdad pact is very significant. Its primary focus was on attacking the British rather than the Jordanian regime itself, and it did not itself call for the overthrow of King Hussein. In other words, this propaganda was intended to pressure the regime, and likely to implicitly convince King Hussein that his prospects for remaining in power would be greater if he declined to join the Baghdad Pact, and Jordan decided in December that it would not join the agreement. King Hussein remained in power, and sided with Egypt in future crises such as in the 1956 Suez Crisis or in the 1967 Arab-Israeli war. Egypt thus derived a direct reward from their pragmatic approach towards King Hussein's regime, and the example of the dispute over the Baghdad Pact may have convinced King Hussein that he needed to align with Egypt in future crisis situations. The power of Arab Nationalism also led King Hussein to dismiss the British General John Bagot Glubb as commander of the Arab Legion in 1956. The dismissal of Glubb took place while the British Foreign Secretary was in Egypt, and the British believed that represented a direct challenge by Nasser to their authority in the region.

=== The Tripartite Aggression ===
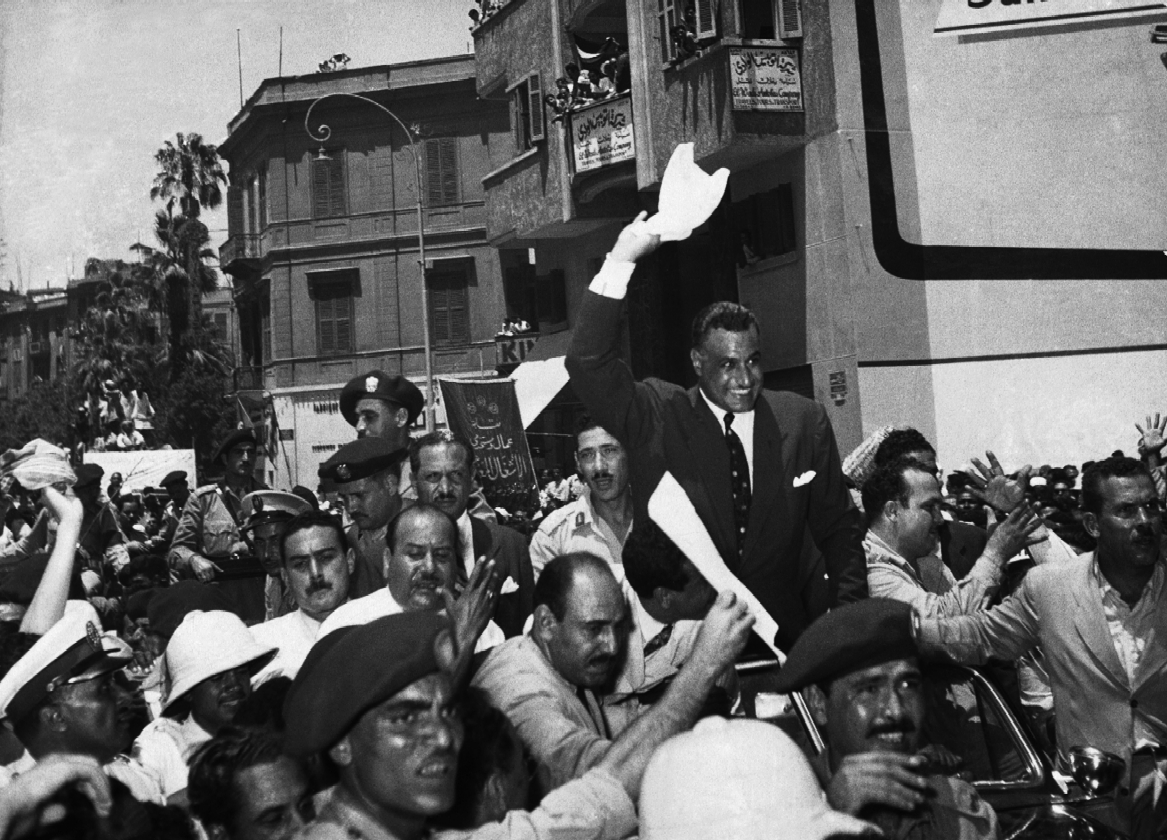
Nasser returns to cheering crowds in Cairo after announcing the nationalization of the Suez Canal Company

==== Background ====
Egypt had been seeking loans from the World Bank since late 1955 to finance the construction of the Aswan High Dam. A tentative agreement with the World Bank, the US and Britain indicated that US$70 million would be provided for the project. However, Nasser had recently (September 27, 1955) negotiated an agreement with the Soviet Union which provided technical and military aid to the regime, thereby angering the United States which had up until the point been supportive of Nasser and his anti-British and anti-French colonialism. Consequently, after pressure from the British government concerning the threat posed by Nasser, on 20 July 1956, the US and Britain withdrew their offers of funding, and the World Bank went back on the agreement. On 26 July, Nasser gave a historic speech announcing the nationalisation of the Suez Canal Company, under his "Egyptianization" policy, and whose revenues would be used to finance the construction of the High Dam, which was completed in January 1968. The nationalisation escalated tension with Britain and France, which froze Egyptian assets and put their armies on alert.

On 1 August, the USSR offered to fund the High Dam project. Relations with Britain and France which had deteriorated to a frosty cold war level by the summer, were framed anew when the United States withdrew much of its support in demonstration against Nasser's growing friendship with the Soviet Union. Having at last convinced the United States of its error in supporting the Free Officers Movement and the special threat posed by Nasser, the British and French felt free to intrigue for his overthrow. These moves culminated in the Tripartite Anglo-French-Israeli aggression on Egypt in October.

==== Plan ====
In a final replay of old European power politics, the British and French negotiated a plan with Israel which would result in the return of the Suez to the British and French, the overthrow of the Nasser regime, and restoration of European, Christian and Jewish property. Although the later had suffered under the new regime, unlike the Europeans, most Jewish property survived the Egyptianization. Consequently, Israel, which had previously been used as an interlocuteur for both Soviet and American support for the RCC still had substantial elements operating in Egypt. Now the British and French decided to use this to their advantage once Israel saw the large threat Nasser posed to their continued existence. Under their plan, Israeli elements in Egypt with launch false flag operations which would be used as a pretext for Israeli launching a surprise attack on Egypt across the Sinai and toward the Suez. Using the terms of the Canal treaty which allowed the British and French to use military force in protection of the canal, an Anglo-French force would invade the canal area and subsequently invade Cairo.

==== Invasion ====
Israeli troops invaded Gaza and advanced toward the Sinai on 29 October. Accordingly, under the terms of the Canal Treaty, the British and French troops attacked the Canal Zone on 31 October using a combined force of air strikes, naval bombardment, and parachute drops. Large amphibious and infantry units were steaming from Cyprus and Algeria toward the canal for the final occupation and push into Cairo. Whilst the operation had all the elements necessary for surprise and legerdemain, it lacked quickness of speed given the relative strategic weakness which the British and French found themselves in the post-war period.

For although the British and French still had substantial force projection capabilities and were the overwhelming military power in the region, both countries were heavily dependent on American support for their economies through the purchase of British and French debt, American direct investment, and most importantly, through the support American oil companies provided for European consumption. Consequently, by the time when the Anglo-French armada began its reinforcement of British and French positions on the Canal, the American government had already come under massive pressure from the United Nations, the Soviet Union, and most importantly from American oil companies which saw the British and French as impediments to their commercial expansion in the Middle East.

When the American anger at the British and French intervention was felt at Whitehall, the British government fractured between those who saw the futility of maintaining the British Empire, those who saw the potential threat the Americans posed to the overall British economy should they end financial support of the British economy, and those British interests which still saw a need, a necessity and a reason for maintaining the British Empire. Thus, when the Eisenhower Administration initiated an oil embargo on the British and French, there was immediate panic in the British government. The French however were proving more resolute and flouted American demands stating matter of factly that America had no interest in the Middle East and were duplicitous in their support of Arab nationalism and anti-colonialism.

However, with the embargo, the British pound which as a reserve currency was used in the purchase of oil had its liquidity threatened. While the British government debated this turn of events, the military campaign dithered and proved lacklustre in its execution, thereby buying crucial time for the Nasser regime to rally support from American liberals, the Soviet Union, and others in the United Nations. Finally, when in a bid of solidarity with the Nasser regime, the US government said it would no longer price support the British pound through the purchasing of British debt, the appeasers within the British government gained the upper hand and forced a surrender to American demands. Consequently, British operations were halted on 7 November. When negotiations between the British and Americans made clear that the US was in opposition to the continuation of the British and French Empires, the British government's position on its control of the Suez Canal collapsed. Henceforth it was not military operations but the liquidation of what remained of British and French assets and prestige which allowed the Anglo-French armies to remain until finally, on 22 December they were removed. As a result, all British and French banks and companies, 15,000 establishments in all, were nationalized, a process that was later extended to all foreign establishments and also to Egyptian firms. But more importantly, the event marked the abandonment of by the United States to an overt Western Civilizational identity especially of supremacy, as well as America's opposition to a European global commercial presence which it viewed as a competitor to its own global vision. As a result, with the primary leader of the West opposed to the very raison d'être of European colonialism, the Suez Crisis, initiated by the Free Officers Movement and the Egyptian Revolution of 1952 marked the end of European Civilization Supremacy.

According to the prominent historian Abd aI-’Azim Ramadan, Nasser decision to nationalize the Suez Canal was his alone, made without political or military consultation. The events leading up to the nationalization of the Suez Canal Company, as other events during Nasser's rule, showed Nasser's inclination to solitary decision making. He considers Nasser to be far from a rational, responsible leader.

=== Union with Syria ===
United Arab Republic flag

On 22 February 1958, Egypt united with Syria, creating the United Arab Republic (UAR). The 1956 Constitution was abrogated following the union and a provisional one decreed. The Egyptian National Assembly was dissolved. On 2 April, Nasser issued a decree establishing the flag of the Republic as three horizontal bars of red, white and black with two stars. There was a crackdown on communists on 31 December for their allegedly lukewarm response to the Union with Syria.

Following Syrian secession in 1962, a Preparatory Committee of the National Congress of Popular Forces was convened in Cairo to prepare for a National Congress to lay down a Charter for National Action. The 1,750-member Congress of representatives from peasant, laborer, professional and occupational associations meets in May to debate the Draft National Charter presented by Nasser. On 30 June, the Congress approves the Charter, which sets up a new political organization, the Arab Socialist Union (ASU) to replace the National Union. 50 per cent of the seats in the ASU are to be filled by farmers and workers. Elected ASU units are set up in factories, firms, agricultural cooperatives, ministries and professional syndicates.

=== Yemen War ===
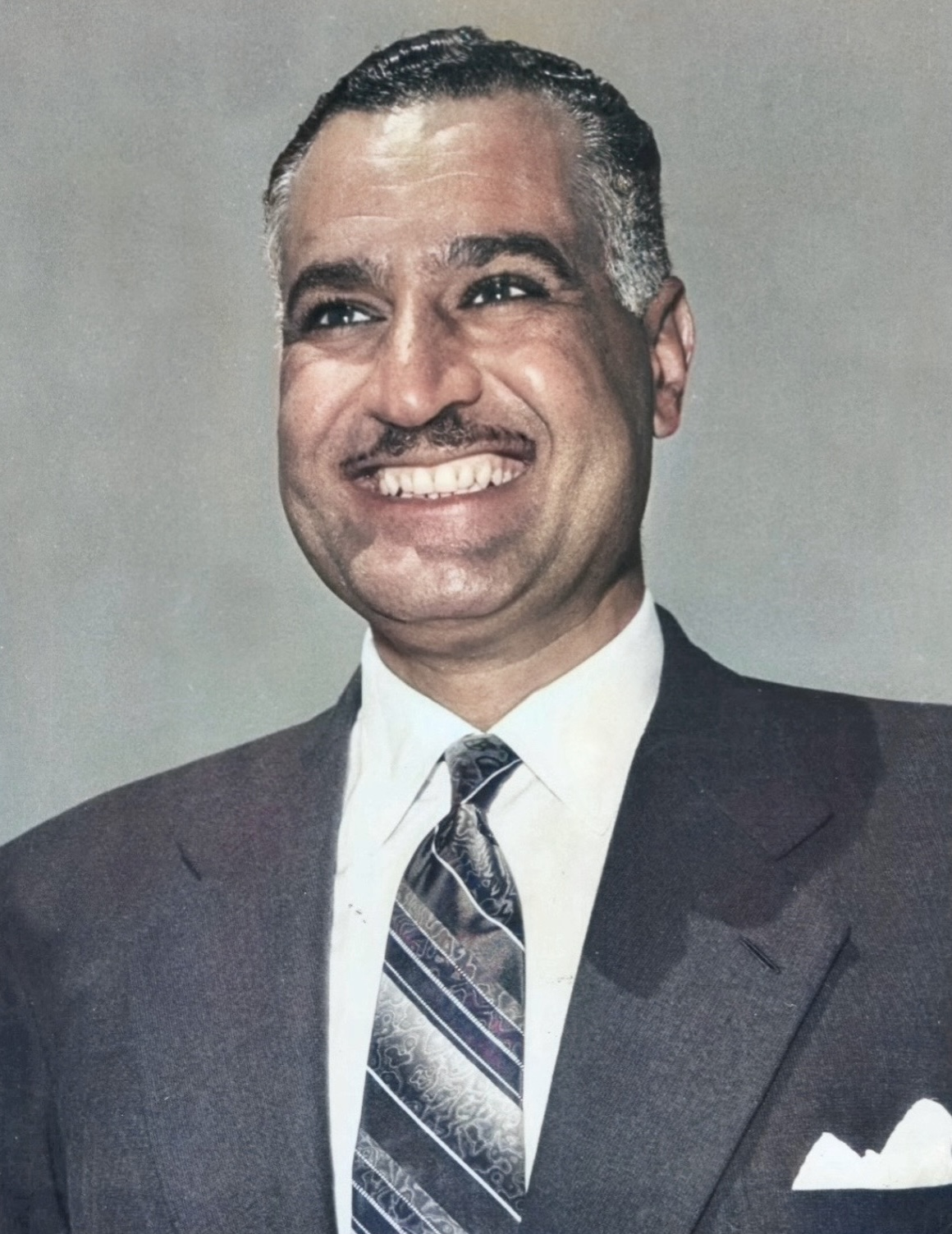
Nasser in 1962

In 1962, Egypt became involved in the civil war in Yemen, supporting the revolutionary regime of Abdullah al-Sallal that had ousted the country's former ruler, Imam Badr, and declared a republic. This proved to be a considerable financial and military burden on Egypt and created antipathy toward Saudi Arabia, which supported the Yemeni loyalists.

=== 1967 War ===
From 14 May 1967 Nasser poured his divisions into Sinai Peninsula, near the Israeli border. Under Arab pressure and as a result of rising popular expectations of Arab military might, on 18 May 1967, Nasser asks UN Secretary General U Thant to withdraw the United Nations Emergency Force (UNEF) stationed on Egypt's side of the border with Israel in Sinai. Egypt closed the Straits of Tiran to Israeli shipping although Israel repeatedly declared that closure of the Straits of Tiran would be an act of war. King Hussein of Jordan visited Cairo on 30 May, signing a Jordanian-Egyptian defense pact.

On 5 June, Israeli army forces dealt a crushing blow to Egypt. Seventeen Egyptian airfields were attacked, and most of the Egyptian air force destroyed on the ground leading to the Israeli occupation of the Sinai Peninsula and the Egyptian-controlled Gaza Strip. Jordan and Syria entered the war on Egypt's side, and Israel reacted and occupied the Jordanian territories of the West Bank and the Syrian Golan Heights. Egypt, Jordan and Syria accepted a UN Security Council ceasefire on 7 June to 10 June.

Egypt's defeat in the 1967 War compelled Nasser to resign on 9 June, naming Vice-President Zakaria Mohieddin as his successor. However, he relented following massive popular demonstrations of support. Seven high-ranking officers were tried in the wake of the defeat, including Minister of War Shams Badran. Commander-in-Chief of the armed forces Field-Marshal Abdel-Hakim Amer was arrested and is reported to have committed suicide while in custody in August.

== Society ==
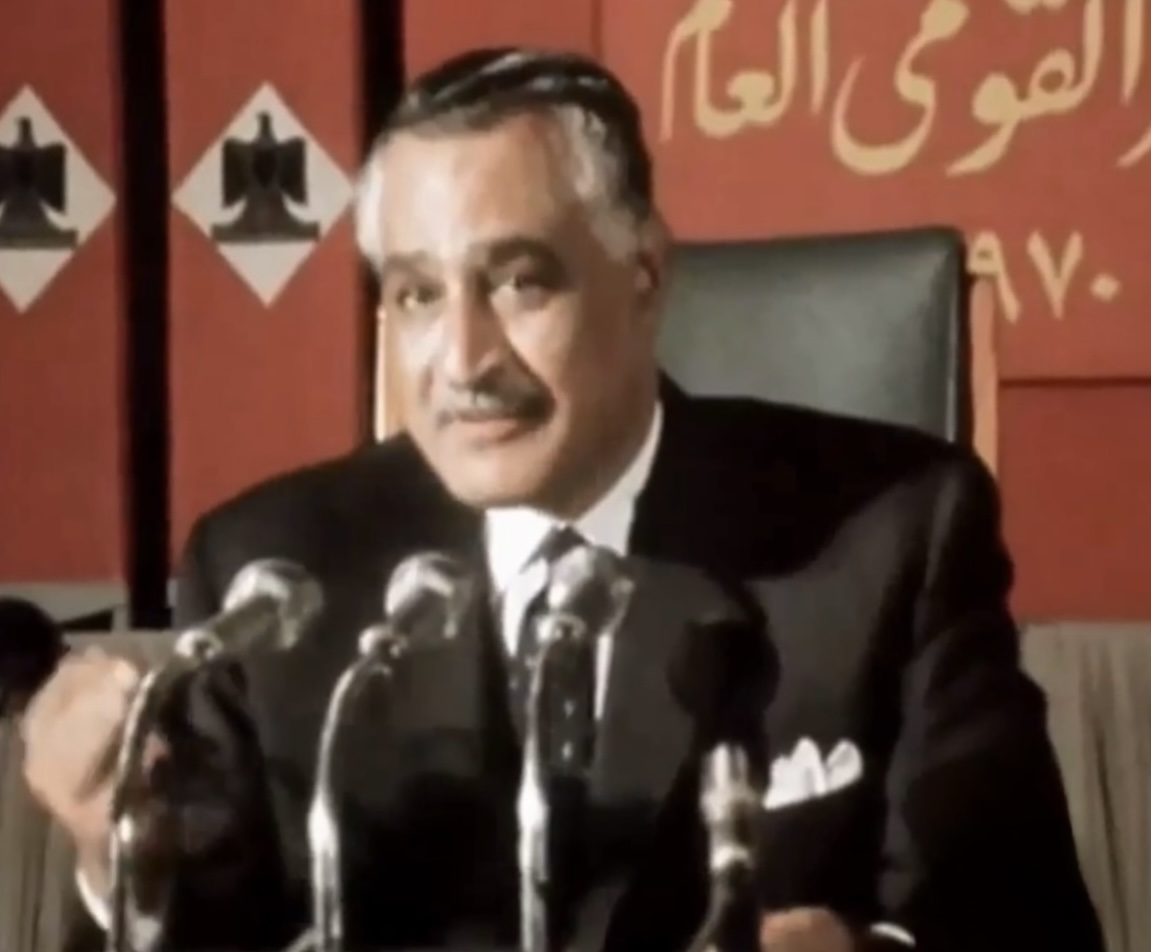
Nasser delivering his final speech to the nation on 23 July 1970

At the time of the fall of the Egyptian monarchy in the early 1950s, less than half a million Egyptians were considered upper class and rich, four million middle class and 17 million lower class and poor. Fewer than half of all primary-school-age children attended school, and most of them being boys. Nearly 75% of the population over ten years of age, and over 90% of all females were illiterate. Nasser's policies changed this. Land reform, the major assets' confiscation programme, the dramatic growth in university education, the creation of a dominating public sector flattened the social curve. From academic year 1953-54 through 1965–66, overall public school enrollments more than doubled. Millions of previously poor Egyptians, through education and jobs in the public sector, joined the middle class. Doctors, engineers, teachers, lawyers, journalists, constituted the bulk of the swelling middle class in Egypt under Nasser.

== See also ==
- History of Egypt under Anwar Sadat
- Egyptian revolution of 2011
- Egyptian Revolutionary Command Council
- History of modern Egypt
- List of modern conflicts in the Middle East
