= 20th century departures of foreign nationals from Egypt =

The 20th century departures of foreign nationals from Egypt primarily concerned European and Levantine communities. These communities consisting of British, French, Greeks, Italians, Armenians, Maltese and Jews had been established in Egypt since the 19th century. These foreign nationals became known as the "Egyptianized", or the Mutamassirun. The foreign resident population in Egypt numbered around 200,000 by the end of World War 1. This departure of foreign nationals was precipitated by political instability, the Suez Crisis, the abolition of the capitulations system, and the rise of Egyptian nationalism under Gamal Abdel Nasser. In 1956, the Egyptian Minister of Interior Zakaria Mohieddin said that of Egypt's 18,000 British and French citizens, 12,000 were ordered to be expelled; their properties seized by the Egyptian government.

== Background ==
The movement of the Mutamassirun ("Egyptianized"), which included the British and French, and also Jews, Greeks, Italians, Syro-Lebanese, and Armenians, began after World War I. According to Andrew Gorman, this was primarily a result of the "decolonization process and the rise of Egyptian nationalism". Following the invasion of Egypt by Britain, France, and Israel in 1956, the new president Gamal Abdel Nasser enacted a set of sweeping regulations abolishing civil liberties while implementing targeted policies, allowing the state to stage mass arrests and strip away Egyptian citizenship from any group it desired.

== Movements ==
Population of Egypt, 1907–60
	1907	1917	1927	1937	1947	1960
Egyptians	11,189,978	12,512,106	13,952,264	15,734,170	18,966,767	25,984,101
European nationals						
Greeks	62,973	56,731	76,264	68,559	57,427	47,673
Italians	34,926	40,198	52,462	47,706	27,958	14,089
British/Maltese	20,356	24,354	34,169	31,523	28,246	25,175
French	14,591	21,270	24,332	18,821	9,717	25,175
Others					16,664	25,175
Other Communities						
Jews	38,635	58,581	63,550	62,953	65,639	8,561
Armenians	7,747	12,854	17,145	16,886	–	–
Syrians, Palestinians, and other Arab nationalities	33,947	31,725	39,605	38,692	–	56,375

=== Greeks ===
Egyptian Greeks, often referred to as "Egyptiot Greeks" or simply "Egyptiots", were a prominent ethnic community in Egypt with roots dating back centuries. The exodus of Greeks from Egypt started before the coup d'état of 1952.

According to Al-Jazeera's documentary "Egypt: The Other Homeland," Greeks and Egyptians shared a connection rooted in their ancient civilizations. It was the Greeks who established the first cinemas, industries, and theaters in Egypt, and they introduced commodities like wine and cigarettes to Egyptian society. Flourishing Greek communities existed in cities such as Alexandria, Cairo, and Port Said. In the early 19th century, Greek immigrants to Egypt began cultivating the country's cotton industry, which significantly benefited the Egyptian economy.

With the establishment of Gamal Abdel Nasser's new regime, the rise of Pan-Arab nationalism, and the subsequent nationalization of many industries in 1961 and 1963, thousands of Greek employees emigrated. Initially, Nasser assured the Greeks that they would not be harmed by his new policies due to their demonstrated loyalty during the Suez Crisis. Greek volunteers joined the Egyptian Army against British and French troops, and large Greek elements were visible during protests throughout the country. The Greeks believed they would be exempt from the new procedures against foreigners, as promised by Nasser. However, between 1956 and 1960, Nasser reneged on his assurances, and Greeks were included in the measures targeting foreigners. With financial assistance from the Greek government, many Greeks began to leave. As a result, the Greek population in Egypt decreased by 80%.

Many Greek schools, churches, small communities, and institutions subsequently closed, but many continue to function to this day. The Nasser regime saw a significant exodus of Greeks from Egypt, but most of the minority left the country either before or after the period 1952–1970. The Arab-Israeli war of 1967 contributed to the uprooting of the sizable Greek community in the Suez Canal cities, especially in Port Said.

=== Italians ===
The Italian presence in Egypt grew significantly in the early nineteenth century due to two main factors: the country's role as a refuge for Italian political exiles and the demand for workers during the modernization projects under Muhammad Ali and Isma'il. However, the Italian community in Egypt faced challenges during the mid-twentieth century.

Beginning before the 1952 coup d'état, many Italians left Egypt gradually. The rise of Pan-Arab nationalism under Gamal Abdel Nasser and the subsequent nationalization of industries in the 1960s prompted thousands of Italian employees to emigrate, seeking better prospects elsewhere.

Italian educational institutions, notably Salesian schools, underwent transformations that contributed to the departure of Italians from Egypt. Changes in state-level educational policies and the 'Egyptianization' strategy, aimed at integrating Egyptians into the workforce, limited opportunities for Italian expatriates. By the early 1960s, over 40,000 Italians had left Egypt, mostly as "repatriates" or "national refugees," seeking refuge in Italy due to their ties to the country.

=== Jews ===
The status of Egyptian Jews and their acquisition of Egyptian nationality have been subjects of debate, particularly regarding their motivations and the wider context of suspicion towards minorities, particularly Jews. Mahmud Abd al-Daher, in his work Yahu' d Mis' r, argues that around 49% of Egyptian Jews held Egyptian nationality in 1897, primarily as Ottoman subjects residing locally. During the 19th century, Jewish immigrants arrived in Egypt from various Mediterranean countries and Ottoman areas, contributing to the diverse community.

In November of 1945, Egyptian Jews faced a two-day pogrom with five Jews killed across Cairo and Alexandria, as well as hundreds injured. A synagogue was burnt down and Jewish shops were looted. Egyptian Company Law 138, promulgated in 1947, is cited as evidence that Egyptian Jews declared themselves 'Egyptian' only when their economic positions were challenged. This law facilitated the 'Egyptianization' process, aiming to ensure Egyptian control over the economy. The diminishing public activities of Egyptian Jews after the Palestine War (1948) and the Israeli Lavon Affair (1954) further fueled skepticism towards them and their role in Egypt's economy.

The Lavon Affair, also known as Operation Susannah, had far-reaching consequences for the Jewish community in Egypt and Israel's political landscape. The operation involved a clandestine plan by Israel's military intelligence branch, Aman, to carry out false-flag attacks in Egypt. The goal was to target Western and Egyptian institutions. A small group of Egyptian Jews, trained in Israel and Egypt, were tasked with executing the attacks in the hopes of destabilising the regime of President Gamal Abdel Nasser and undermining relations between Egypt, the United States, and Britain.

The operation commenced with bombings targeting post offices, a railway terminal, U.S. Information Agency libraries, and a British theater in Alexandria and Cairo. However, the Egyptian government became aware of the plan, leading to the arrest of the perpetrators. The failure of Operation Susannah shocked Israel's leaders, who were unwilling to accept responsibility for the activation of the sleeper cell. Due to the Israeli government's refusal to admit to the operation during the trial against them, the general Israeli population remained unaware, while the media depicted the trial as an unjust and anti-Semitic setup. This situation, among other concerns, posed a significant threat to the safety of the more than 50,000 Jewish residents in Egypt.

The complexity of Egyptian Jews' lives cannot be divorced from wider political events, such as the Palestine War of 1947–1948. Despite their contributions to Egyptian society, attitudes towards Egyptian Jews worsened over time, exacerbated by events like the Suez War and suspicions of involvement in Zionist activities. Many Egyptian Jews faced increased insecurity and were arrested during the Suez War, leading to a significant decrease in their numbers in the years following the conflict. The secret police raided Jewish owned properties on occasional basis and arrested Jewish citizens.

Reasons for migration among Egyptian Jews included discontent, incidents of property damage supported by nationalist and Islamist slogans, and the worsening attitudes towards them following the Palestine War and the Lavon Affair. Despite their contributions to Egypt's economy and society, the deteriorating relationship between Egyptians and Egyptian Jews ultimately led to a significant decrease in the Jewish population in Egypt in the aftermath of the Suez War.

After the Suez Crisis of 1956, the secret police raided Jewish properties and arrested thousands of Jewish citizens. Thousands of Jews began to depart Egypt due to the increasing pressure.

Some 23,000—25,000 Jews out of 42,500 in Egypt left, mainly for Israel, Western Europe, the United States, South America, and Australia. Many were forced to sign declarations that they were voluntarily emigrating and agreed to the confiscation of their assets. Similar measures were enacted against British and French nationals in retaliation for the invasion. Egyptian nationality law was amended to make Jews and other minorities ineligible for Egyptian citizenship. By 1957 the Jewish population of Egypt had fallen to 15,000.

=== Armenians ===
The Armenian community in Egypt boasts a rich and storied history, characterized by its distinct language, churches, and social institutions. Despite being a minority group, Armenians have made significant contributions to Egyptian society. However, the Armenian population in Egypt has experienced a decline over the years due to various factors, including migration to other countries and integration into broader Egyptian society. Extensive intermarriage with Muslims and Christians has also contributed to this decline. Today, the Armenian community in Egypt numbers around 6,000 individuals, significantly smaller than in previous generations. The majority of Armenians are concentrated in Cairo and Alexandria, the country's two largest cities. Economically, Egyptian Armenians have often pursued self-employment as businessmen or craftsmen and tend to have higher levels of education compared to the national average.

Armenians first arrived in Egypt as asylum seekers following the Armenian genocide of 1915 in the Ottoman Empire. At their peak, Armenians in Egypt numbered around 60,000 individuals. However, the year 1961 marked a significant turning point when the Egyptian government nationalized many industries, dealing a decisive blow to Egyptians, including Armenians, who were heavily involved in economic activities. This led to a further decrease in the Armenian population in Egypt as many chose to emigrate in search of better opportunities elsewhere.

=== British and French ===
After the 1956 war, Egyptian military soldiers were patrolled to British and French properties and conducted search operations and ordered British and French citizens to leave within a week, they had to hand over their property to the Egyptian government.

== In fiction ==
- Kamal Ruhayyim's novel Days in the Diaspora portrays the life of an exiled family whose mother is an Egyptian Jew.
- André Aciman's memoir Out of Egypt addresses the experience of his family in Alexandria.
- Naguib Mahfouz's novel Miramar takes place in a pension belonging to Mariana, a Greek woman who laments the expulsions' effects on her life and business.

== See also ==
- Armenians in Egypt
- Syro-Lebanese in Egypt
- Greeks in Egypt
- Italian Egyptians
- History of the Jews in Egypt
- 1945 anti-Jewish riots in Egypt

== Sources and further reading ==
- Gorman, Anthony (2003). "The Mutamassirun". Historians, State and Politics in Twentieth Century Egypt: Contesting the Nation. Psychology Press. ISBN 9780415297530.
- Miccoli, Dario (2015). Histories of the Jews of Egypt An imagined bourgeoisie, 1880s–1950s. Routledge. ISBN 978-1-138-80205-6.
- Kazamias, Alexander (2009). "The 'Purge of the Greeks' from Nasserite Egypt: Myths and Realities". Journal of the Hellenic Diaspora. 35 (2): 13–34.
- Krämer, Gudrun (1989). The Jews in Modern Egypt, 1914–1952. I.B. Tauris. ISBN 9781850431008.
- Laskier, Michael (1995). "Egyptian Jewry under the Nasser Regime, 1956–70". Middle Eastern Studies. 31 (3): 573–619. doi:10.1080/00263209508701070. JSTOR 4283743.
