= Mutamassirun =

"Egyptianized" Europeans residing in Egypt

Mutamassirun (Arabic: متمصرون, romanized: Mutamaṣṣirūn; singular: متمصر, Mutamaṣṣir; lit. 'Egyptianized') refers to what Egyptians saw as foreigners to Egypt, primarily during the 19th and 20th centuries. While many Egyptians saw Mutamaṣṣirūn as Europeans residing and/or naturalized in Egypt, the community had diverse origins that consisted of Greeks, Italians, Jews, Armenians and Maltese.

The Mutamassirun community was first established in Egypt in the early 19th century, following the French campaign and Muhammad Ali's seizure of power. From the early 20th century they became an important component of Egyptian society, and despite their diversity were usually viewed as a homogeneous group by Egyptian nationalists. The populations that carried British or French nationality were expelled in the 1950s in retaliation for the Suez Crisis.

Around 6,000–60,000 ethnic Greeks and 3,000 ethnic Italians, descendants of their Mutamassirun ancestors, remain in Egypt today but changed their nationality to Egyptian.

== See also ==
- Pieds-noirs
- Egyptian nationalism

== Bibliography ==
- Gorman, Anthony (2003). "The Mutamassirun". Historians, State and Politics in Twentieth Century Egypt: Contesting the Nation. Psychology Press. ISBN 9780415297530.
