= Jacqueline Kahanoff =

Egyptian-born Israeli novelist, essayist and journalist

Jacqueline Kahanoff

Jacqueline Shohet Kahanoff (Hebrew: ז'קלין כהנוב; Arabic: جاكلين شوحيط; May 18, 1917 – October 24, 1979) was an Egyptian-born Israeli novelist, essayist and journalist. Kahanoff wrote in English, although she is best known for a cycle of essays, “A Generation of Levantines,” that was published in Israel in Hebrew translation in 1959. These pieces lay out her notion of “Levantinism,” a social model of coexistence drawn from her childhood experiences in Egyptian cosmopolitan society in the interwar period.

== Biography ==
Jacqueline Shohet was born in May 1917 in Cairo. Her father, Joseph Shohet, was an Iraqi Jew who had moved to Egypt as a child, while her mother, Yvonne Chemla, was born in Egypt to Tunisian Jewish parents. Her mother's family established the department store Chemla Frères.

In 1940, Jacqueline Shohet moved to the United States with her first husband, Izzy Margoliash. After the marriage ended, she moved to New York where she earned a degree in journalism from Columbia University. In 1952 she married Alexander Kahanoff in Paris. Two years later they moved to Israel, first settling in Beersheba, and then relocating to the Tel Aviv suburbs. Jacqueline Kahanoff died in October 1979.

== Writing career ==
While in the United States, Kahanoff began publishing fiction. Her stories “Cairo Wedding” (Tomorrow, 1945) and “Such is Rachel” (Atlantic Monthly, 1946) were the first to appear. In 1951 she published a novel, Jacob’s Ladder. After she settled in Israel she turned to journalism and personal narrative essays. Her 1958 article “Reflections of a Levantine Jew” published in the American Jewish journal Jewish Frontier caught the attention of Nessim Rejwan, an anglophone Iraqi-Jewish writer also living in Israel. Rejwan introduced Kahanoff to Aharon Amir, who had just founded a journal Keshet (Rainbow). Amir took an interest in Kahanoff’s work and published a number of her essays in his journal, including the four-part “Generation of Levantines” cycle, published in 1959. These essays include: “Childhood in Egypt,” “Europe from Afar,” “Rebel, My Brother,” and “Israel: Ambivalent Levantine.” Amir also translated Kahanoff’s work from English into Hebrew, although he is never credited with these translations in print. Near the end of her life, Amir also edited a collection of her most influential essays published under the title Mi mizrah shemesh (From East the Sun, 1978). To date there are two posthumous collections of her writings Bein shnei ‘olamot (Between Two Worlds, 2005) and Mongrels or Marvels: The Levantine Writings of Jacqueline Shohet Kahanoff (2011).

Kahanoff’s writings have influenced several generations of Israeli Jews of Sephardi and Mizrahi origins. As a testament to this influence, Jacqueline Kahanoff appears as a character in Ronit Matalon’s novel Ze ‘im ha-panim eleinu (The One Facing Us), and two of Kahanoff’s essays are reprinted within the novel. The text of Kahanoff's "Europe from Afar" is also the basis for the video art piece of the same title by Eva Meyer and Eran Schaerf (2001). Kahanoff's writings were also an inspiration the Journal of Levantine Studies, which printed her essay "What about Levantinization?" in the inaugural issue.

== Books ==
- Jacob’s Ladder. London: Harvill Press, 1951. (published under Jacqueline Shohet)
- Ramat-Hadassah-Szold: Youth Aliyah Screening and Classification Centre. Jerusalem: Publishing Dept. of the Jewish Agency at Goldberg's Press, 1960.
- Sipurim Afrikayim benei zmaneinu, edited by Jacqueline Kahanoff. Tel Aviv: ‘Am Ha-sefer, 1963.
- Mi-mizrah shemesh. Tel Aviv: Hadar, 1978.
- Bein shenei ‘olamot, edited by David Ohana. Jerusalem: Keter, 2005.
- Mongrels or Marvels: The Levantine Writings of Jacqueline Shohet Kahanoff, edited by Deborah A. Starr and Sasson Somekh. Stanford: Stanford University Press, 2011.

== See also ==
- History of the Jews in Egypt
- History of the Jews in Tunisia
- Cicurel family
- Pallache family
