= History of the Jews in Egypt =

Egyptian Jews اليهود المصريون יהודי מצרים
- The location of Egypt in Africa

Total population
- 57,500+

Regions with significant populations
- Israel: 57,500
- Egypt: 5 (2022)

Languages
- Hebrew, Egyptian Arabic (Judeo-Egyptian Arabic)

Religion
- Judaism (Rabbinic and Karaite)

Related ethnic groups
- Mizrahi Jews, Sephardi Jews, Ashkenazi Jews, Ethiopian Jews, Yemeni Jews

The history of the Jews in Egypt goes back to ancient times. Egyptian Jews or Jewish Egyptians refer to the Jewish community in Egypt who mainly consisted of Egyptian Arabic-speaking Rabbanites and Karaites. Though Egypt had its own community of Egyptian Jews, after the Jewish expulsion from Spain more Sephardi and Karaite Jews began to migrate to Egypt, and then their numbers increased significantly with the growth of trading prospects after the opening of the Suez Canal in 1869. As a result, Jews from many territories of the Ottoman Empire as well as Italy and Greece started to settle in the main cities of Egypt, where they thrived (see Mutammasirun). The Ashkenazi community, mainly confined to Cairo's Darb al-Barabira quarter, began to arrive in the aftermath of the waves of pogroms that hit Europe in the latter part of the 19th century.

The Jewish population peaked in Egypt at somewhere between 75,000 and 80,000 in 1948. In the aftermath of the 1948 Palestine War, the 1954 Lavon Affair, and the 1956 Suez War, Jews and European groups like the French and British emigrated; much of their property was also confiscated (see 20th century departures of foreign nationals from Egypt).

As of 2016, the president of Cairo's Jewish community said that there were six Jews in Cairo, all women over age 65, and twelve Jews in Alexandria. As of 2019, there were at least five known Jews in Cairo and as of 2017, twelve were still reported in Alexandria. In December 2022, it was reported that only three Egyptian Jews were living in Cairo.

== Ancient Egypt ==
The Hebrew Bible describes a long period of time during which the Israelites (the ancient Semitic-speaking people from whom Jews originate) settled in ancient Egypt, were enslaved, and were ultimately liberated by Moses, who led them out of Egypt to Canaan. This founding myth of the Israelites—known as the Exodus—is considered to be inaccurate or ahistorical by a majority of scholars. At the same time, most scholars also hold that the Exodus probably has some sort of historical basis, and that a small group of Egyptian origins may have merged with the early Israelites, who were predominantly indigenous to Canaan and begin appearing in the historical record by around 1200 BCE.

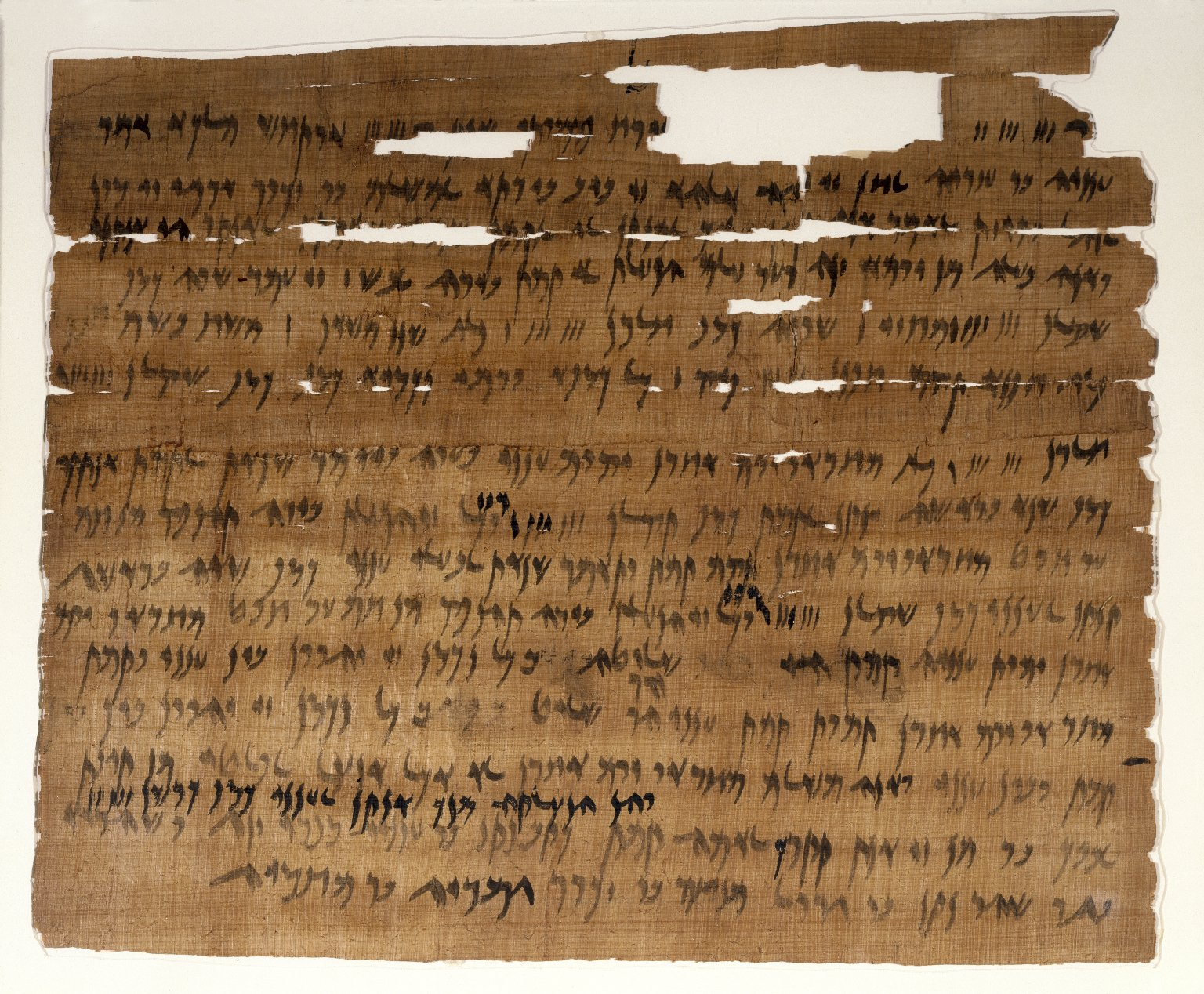
Marriage document of Ananiah and Tamut, written in Aramaic, July 3, 449 B.C.E., Brooklyn Museum

In the Elephantine papyri and ostraca (c. 500 – 300 BCE), caches of legal documents and letters written in Aramaic amply document the lives of a community of Jewish soldiers stationed there as part of a frontier garrison in Egypt for the Achaemenid Empire.

Established at Elephantine in about 650 BCE during Manasseh's reign, these soldiers assisted the Twenty-sixth Dynasty pharaoh Psamtik I of the Nile Delta in his campaigns against the Twenty-fifth Dynasty pharaoh Tantamani of Napata. Their religious system shows strong traces of Babylonian religion, something which suggests to certain scholars that the community was of mixed Judahite and Samarian origins, and they maintained their own temple, functioning alongside that of the local deity Khnum. The documents cover the period 495 to 399 BCE.

According to the Hebrew Bible, a large number of Judeans took refuge in Egypt after the destruction of the Kingdom of Judah in 586 BCE, and the subsequent assassination of the Jewish governor, Gedaliah. (2 Kings 25:22–24, Jeremiah 40:6–8) On hearing of the appointment, the Jewish population that fled to Moab, Ammon, Edom and other countries returned to Judah. (Jeremiah 40:11–12) However, before long Gedaliah was assassinated, and the population that was left in the land and those that had returned ran away to Egypt for safety. (2 Kings 25:26, Jeremiah 43:5–7) The numbers that made their way to Egypt are subject to debate. In Egypt, they settled in Migdol, Tahpanhes, Noph, and Pathros. (Jeremiah 44:1)

== Ptolemaic and Roman periods ==
Further waves of Jewish immigrants settled in Egypt during the Ptolemaic dynasty, especially around Alexandria. Thus, their history in this period centers almost completely on Alexandria, though daughter communities rose up in places like the present Kafr ed-Dawar, and Jews served in the administration as custodians of the river. As early as the third century BCE, there was a widespread diaspora of Jews in many Egyptian towns and cities. In Josephus's history, it is claimed that, after Ptolemy I Soter took Judea, he led some 120,000 Jewish captives to Egypt from the areas of Judea, Jerusalem, Samaria, and Mount Gerizim. With them, many other Jews, attracted by the fertile soil and Ptolemy's liberality, emigrated there of their own accord. An inscription recording a Jewish dedication of a synagogue to Ptolemy III and Berenice was discovered in the 19th century near Alexandria.

Josephus also claims that, soon after, these 120,000 captives were freed from bondage by Philadelphus.

The history of the Alexandrian Jews dates from the foundation of the city by Alexander the Great, 332 BCE, at which they were present. They were numerous from the very outset, forming a notable portion of the city's population under Alexander's successors. The Ptolemies assigned them a separate section, two of the five districts of the city, to enable them to keep their laws pure of indigenous cultic influences. The Alexandrian Jews enjoyed a greater degree of political independence than elsewhere. While the Jewish population elsewhere throughout the later Roman Empire frequently formed private societies for religious purposes, or organized corporations of ethnic groups like the Egyptian and Phoenician merchants in the large commercial centers, those of Alexandria constituted an independent political community, side by side with that of the other ethnic groups. Strabo reported that the Jews of Alexandria had their own ethnarch, who managed community affairs and legal matters similarly to a head of state.

The Hellenistic Jewish community of Alexandria translated the Old Testament into Greek. This translation is called the Septuagint. The translation of the Septuagint itself began in the 3rd century BCE and was completed by 132 BCE, initially in Alexandria, but in time elsewhere as well. It became the source for the Old Latin, Slavonic, Syriac, Old Armenian, Old Georgian, and Coptic versions of the Christian Old Testament. The Jews of Alexandria celebrated the translation with an annual festival on the island of Pharos, where the Lighthouse of Alexandria stood, and where the translation was said to have taken place.

During the period of Roman occupation, there is evidence that at Oxyrhynchus (now Behneseh), on the west side of the Nile, there was a Jewish community of some importance. Many of the Jews there may have become Christians, though they retained their Biblical names (e.g., "David" and "Elizabeth," who appear in litigation concerning an inheritance). Another example was Jacob, son of Achilles (c. 300 CE), who worked as a beadle in a local Egyptian temple. Philo of Alexandria describes an isolated Jewish monastic community known as the Therapeutae, who lived near Lake Mareotis.

The Roman suppression of the Diaspora Revolt (115–117) led to the near-total expulsion and annihilation of Jews from Egypt and nearby Cyrenaica. The Jewish revolt, which is said to have begun in Cyrene and spread to Egypt, was largely motivated by the Zealots, aggravation after the failed Great Revolt and destruction of the Second Temple, and anger at discriminatory laws. Jewish communities are thought to have rebelled due to messianic expectations, hoping for the ingathering of the exiles and the reconstruction of the Temple. A festival celebrating the victory over the Jews continued to be observed eighty years later in Oxyrhynchus. It was not until the third century that Jewish communities were able to re-establish themselves in Egypt, although they never regained their former level of influence.

== Late Roman and Byzantine periods ==
By the late third century, there is substantial evidence of established Jewish communities in Egypt. A papyrus from Oxyrhynchus, dated to 291 CE, confirms the existence of an active synagogue and identifies one of its officials as having come from Palestine. This period likely saw an increase in immigration from Syria Palaestina, as indicated by the rising number of inscriptions, letters, legal documents, liturgical poetry, and magical texts in Hebrew and Aramaic from the fourth and fifth centuries.

The greatest blow Alexandrian Jews received was during the Byzantine Empire rule and the rise of a new state religion: Christianity. There was an expulsion of a large amount of Jews from Alexandria (the so-called "Alexandria Expulsion") in 414 or 415 CE by Saint Cyril, following a number of controversies, including threats from Cyril and supposedly (according to Christian historian Socrates Scholasticus) a Jewish-led massacre in response. Later violence took on a decidedly antisemitic context with calls for ethnic cleansing. Before that time, state/religious-sanctioned claims of a Jewish pariah were not common. In The History of the Decline and Fall of the Roman Empire, Edward Gibbon describes the Alexandria pogrom:

Without any legal sentence, without any royal mandate, the patriarch (Saint Cyril), at the dawn of day, led a seditious multitude to the attack of the synagogues. Unarmed and unprepared, the Jews were incapable of resistance; their houses of prayer were leveled with the ground, and the episcopal warrior, after rewarding his troops with the plunder of their goods, expelled from the city the remnant of the unbelieving nation.

Some authors estimate that around 100,000 Jews were expelled from the city. The expulsion then continued in the nearby regions of Egypt and Palestine followed by a forced Christianization of the Jews.

== Arab rule (641 to 1250) ==
The Muslim conquest of Egypt at first found support from Jewish residents as well, disgruntled by the corrupt administration of the Patriarch of Alexandria Cyrus of Alexandria, notorious for his Monotheletic proselytizing. In addition to the Jewish population settled there from ancient times, some are said to have come from the Arabian Peninsula. The letter sent by Muhammad to the Jewish Banu Janba in 630 is said by Al-Baladhuri to have been seen in Egypt. A copy, written in Hebrew characters, has been found in the Cairo Geniza.

The Treaty of Alexandria, signed on in November 641, which sealed the Arab conquest of Egypt, provided for the rights of Jews (and Christians) to continue to practice their religion freely. 'Amr ibn al-'As, the Arab commander, claimed in a letter to Caliph Umar that there were 40,000 Jews in Alexandria at the time.

Of the fortunes of the Jewish population of Egypt under the Umayyad and Abbasid Caliphates (641–868), little is known. Under the Tulunids (863–905), the Karaite community enjoyed robust growth.

=== Rule of the Fatimid Caliphs (969 to 1169) ===
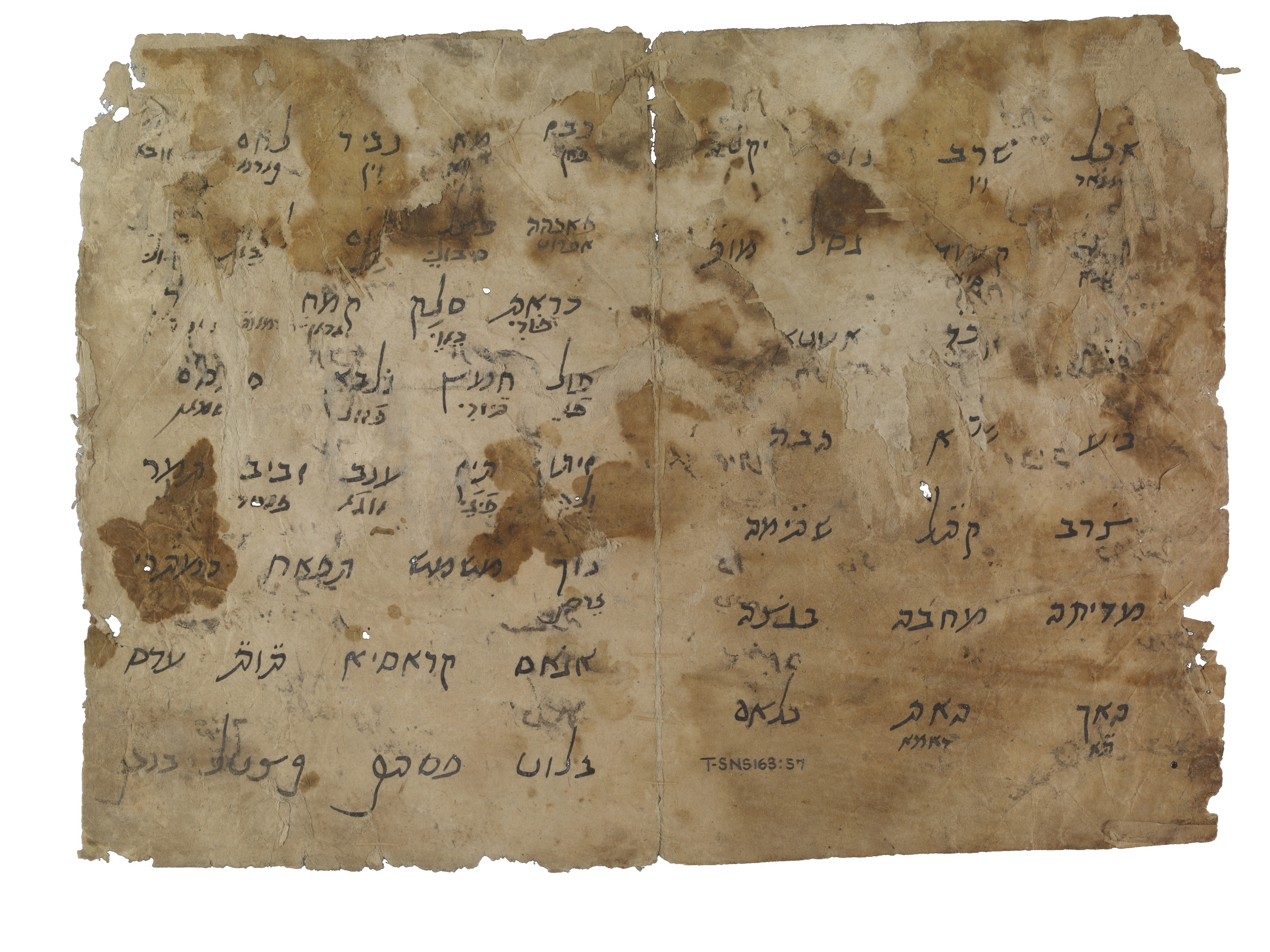
A Cairo Geniza fragment, dating to 1168–1204, with words in Arabic and their Romance translations, both in Hebrew script, believed to have been written by Maimonides. Cambridge University Library

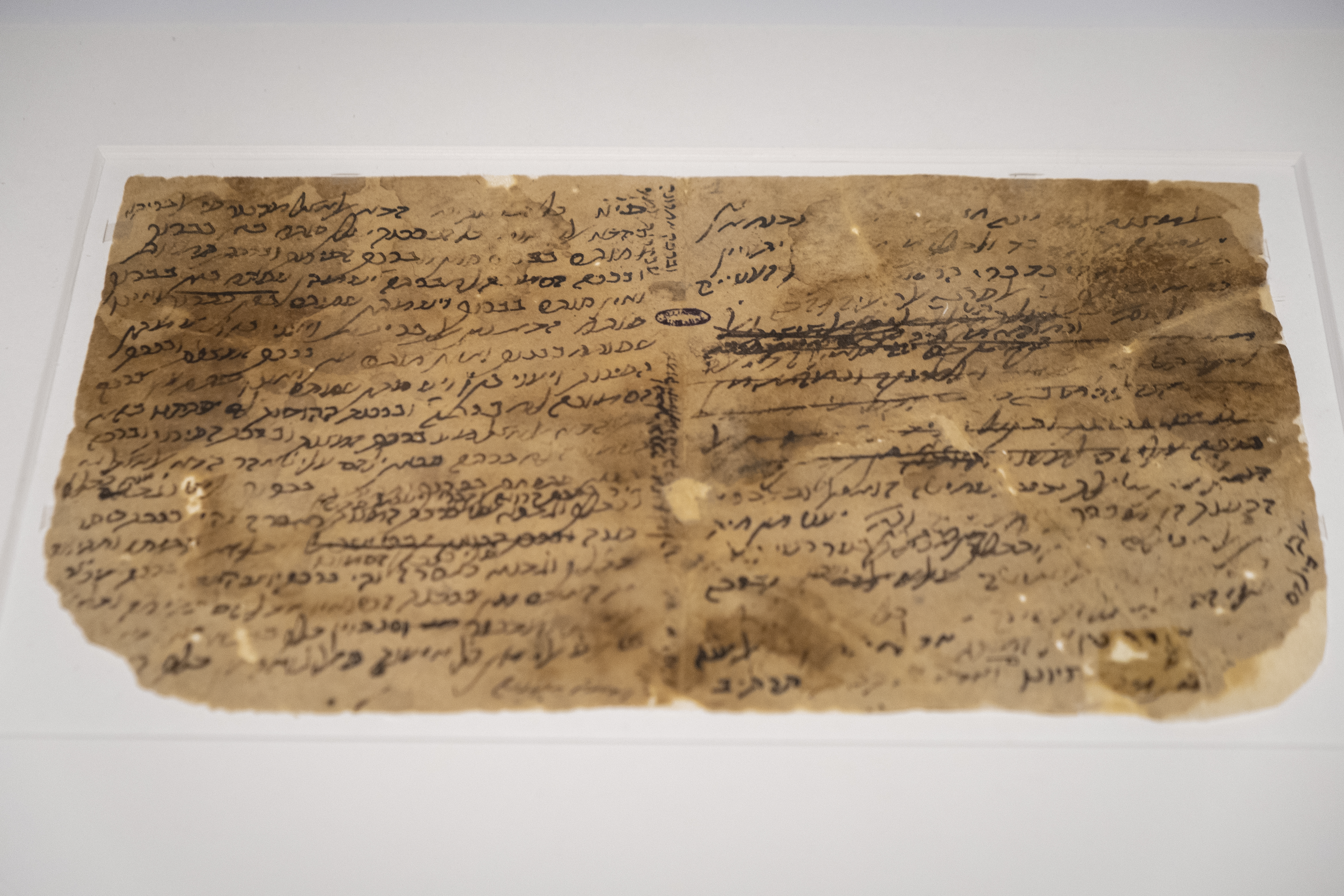
Commentary on the Mishneh Torah, Maimonides, 12th century. Institut du Monde Arabe, Paris

At this time, Jews from North Africa came to settle in Egypt after the Fatimid conquest of Egypt in 969. These Jewish immigrants made up a significant amount of the population from all the Jews living in Egypt. Due to the discovery of the Cairo Geniza documents at the end of the 19th century, a lot is known about Egyptian Jews. From private records, letters, public records, and documents, these sources held the information about the society of the Egyptian Jews.

The rule of the Fatimid Caliphate was in general favorable for the Jewish communities, except the latter portion of al-Hakim bi-Amr Allah's reign. The foundation of Talmudic schools in Egypt is usually placed at this period. One of the Jewish citizens who rose to high position in that society was Ya'qub ibn Killis.

The caliph al-Hakim (996–1020) vigorously applied the Pact of Umar, and compelled the Jewish residents to wear bells and to carry in public the wooden image of a calf. A street in the city, al-Jawdariyyah, was designated for Jewish residency. Al-Hakim, hearing allegations that some mocked him in verses, had the whole quarter burned down.

In the beginning of the 12th century, a Jewish man named Abu al-Munajja ibn Sha'yah was at the head of the Department of Agriculture. He is especially known as the constructor of a Nile sluice (1112), which was called after him "Baḥr Abi al-Munajja". He fell into disfavor because of the heavy expenses connected with the work, and was incarcerated in Alexandria, but was soon able to free himself. A document concerning a transaction of his with a banker has been preserved. Under the vizier Al-Malik al-Afḍal (1137) there was a Jewish master of finances, whose name, however, is unknown. His enemies succeeded in procuring his downfall, and he lost all his property. He was succeeded by a brother of the Christian patriarch, who tried to drive the Jews out of the kingdom. Four leading Jews worked and conspired against the Christian, with what result is not known. There has been preserved a letter from this ex-minister to the Jews of Constantinople, begging for aid in a remarkably intricate poetical style. One of the physicians of the caliph Al-Ḥafiẓ (1131–49) was a Jew, Abu Manṣur (Wüstenfeld, p. 306). Abu al-Faḍa'il ibn al-Nakid (died 1189) was a celebrated oculist.

As for government power in Egypt, the highest legal authority who was called chief scholar was held by Ephraim. Later on in the 11th century, this position was held by a father and son with the names of Shemarya b. Elhanan and Elhanan b. Shemarya. Soon the chief of the Palestinian Jews took over the position of chief scholar for the Rabbinates after the death of Elhanan. Around 1065, a Jewish leader was recognized as ráīs al-Yahūd meaning the head of the Jews in Egypt. Later for a sixty-year rule, three family members of court physicians took the position of ráīs al-Yahūd whose names were Judah b. Såadya, Mevorakh b. Såadya, and Moses b. Mevorakh. The position was eventually handed down from Moses Maimonides in the late 12th century to early 15th centuries and was given to his descendants.

As for the Jewish population, there were over 90 Jewish habitations known during the 11th and 12th centuries. These included cities, towns, and villages, contained over 4,000 Jewish citizens. Also for the Jewish population, a little more light is thrown upon the communities in Egypt through the reports of certain Jewish scholars and travelers who visited the country. Judah Halevi was in Alexandria in 1141, and dedicated some beautiful verses to his fellow resident and friend Aaron Ben-Zion ibn Alamani and his five sons. At Damietta Halevi met his friend, the Spaniard Abu Sa'id ibn Ḥalfon ha-Levi. About 1160 Benjamin of Tudela was in Egypt; he gives a general account of the Jewish communities which he found there. At Cairo there were 2,000 Jews; at Alexandria 3,000, whose head was the French-born R. Phineas b. Meshullam; in the Faiyum there were 20 families; at Damietta 200; at Bilbeis, east of the Nile, 300 persons; and at Damira 700.

=== From Saladin and Maimonides (1169 to 1250) ===
Saladin's war with the Crusaders (1169–93) does not seem to have affected the Jewish population with communal struggle. A Karaite doctor, Abu al-Bayyan al-Mudawwar (d. 1184), who had been physician to the last Fatimid, treated Saladin also. Abu al-Ma'ali, brother-in-law of Maimonides, was likewise in his service. In 1166 Maimonides went to Egypt and settled in Fostat, where he gained much renown as a physician, practising in the family of Saladin and in that of his vizier al-Qadi al-Fadil, and Saladin's successors. The title Ra'is al-Umma or al-Millah (Head of the Nation or of the Faith), was bestowed upon him. In Fostat he wrote his Mishneh Torah (1180) and The Guide for the Perplexed, both of which evoked opposition from Jewish scholars. From this place he sent many letters and responsa; and in 1173 he forwarded a request to the North African communities for help to secure the release of a number of captives. The original of the last document has been preserved. He caused the Karaites to be removed from the court.

== Mameluks (1250 to 1517) ==
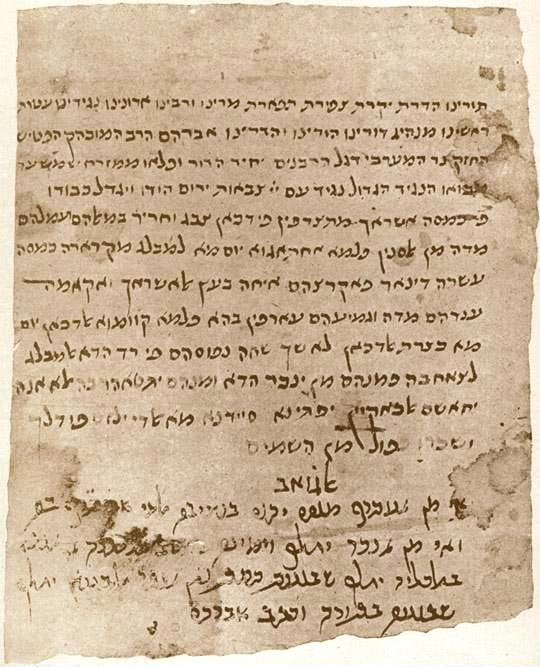
Cairo Genizah fragment by Abraham ibn Maymun

In the mid thirteenth century the Ayyubid empire was plagued with famine, disease, and conflict; a great period of upheaval would see the Golden Islamic Period come to a violent end. Foreign powers began to encircle the Islamic World as the French endeavored on the 7th crusade in 1248 and the Mongol campaigns in the east rapidly making its way into the heartland of Islam. These internal and external pressure weakened the Ayyubid empire.

In 1250 following the death of Sultan As-Salih Ayyub, slave soldiers, Mamluks, rose up and slaughtered all the Ayyubid heirs and the Mamluk leader Aybak became the new sultan. The Mamluks were quick to consolidate power using a strong spirit of defense growing among Muslim faithfuls to rally victoriously against the Mongols in the Battle of Ain Jalut in 1260 and consolidating the remnants of the Ayyubid Syria in 1299.

In this period of aggressive posturing the ulama were quick to denounce foreign influences to safeguard the purity of Islam. In 1300 Sultan Al-Nasir Qalawan ordered all Jews under his rule to wear yellow headgear to isolate the Egyptian Jewish community. This law would be enforced for centuries and later amended in 1354 to force all Jews to wear a sign in addition to yellow headwear. On multiple occasions the ulema persuaded the government to close or convert synagogues. Even major places of pilgrimage for Egyptian Jews such as the Dammah Synagogue were forced to close in 1301. Jews subsequently were excluded from bath houses and were prohibited to work in the national treasury. This repression of the Jewish community would continue for centuries.

In all the religious fervor of the period the Mamluks began to adopt Sufism in an attempt to assuage dissatisfaction with traditional Sunni Islam facilitated solely by the Sultan. At the same time the Mamluk government was unwilling to relinquish control of religion to a clerical class. They endeavored on a massive project of inviting and subsidizing Sufi clerics in an attempt to promote a new state religion. All throughout the country new government-backed Sufi brotherhoods and saint cults grew almost overnight and was able to quell the disapproval of the population. The Mamluk Sultanate would become a safe haven for Sufi mystics all throughout the Islamic world. Across the empire state-sponsored Sufi ceremonies were a clear sign of the full-fledged shift that took hold.

Jews who for the most part were kept segregated from Arab communities first came into contact with Sufism in these state sponsored ceremonies, as they were obliged to attend out of a show of loyalty to the sultan. It is in these ceremonies where many Egyptian Jews first came into contact with Sufism and it would eventually spark a massive movement amongst the Mamluk Jews.

Most Egyptian Jews of the time were members of the Karaite Judaism. This was an anti-rabbinical movement that rejected the teachings of the Talmud. It is believed by historians such as Paul Fenton that the Karaites settled in Egypt as early as the seventh century, and Egypt would remain a bastion for Karaites all the way through the 19th century. As time passed in contact with these relatively new Sufi ideas many Karaites began to push towards reform. Admiration for the structure of khanqahs (Sufi schools), and its doctrinal focus on mysticism began to make many Egyptian Jews long to adopt something similar.

Abraham Maimonides (1204–1237), who was considered to be the most prominent leader and government representative of all Jews, advocated reorganizing Jewish schools to be more like Sufi Hanaqas. His heir Obadyah Maimonides (1228–1265) wrote the Treatise of the Pool, which is a mystical manual written in Arabic and filled with Sufi technical terms. In it he laid out how one may obtain union with the unintelligible world, showing his full adherence and advocacy of mysticism. He also began to reform practices advocating for celibacy and Halwa, solitary meditation, to better tune oneself to the spiritual plane. These were imitations of long held Sufi practices. In fact, he would often portrayed Jewish patriarchs such as Moses and Isaac as hermits who relied on isolated meditation to remain in touch with God. The Maimonides dynasty would essentially spark a new movement, Pietism, amongst Egyptian Jews.

Pietism gained a huge following, mainly amongst the Jewish elite, and it would continue to gain momentum until the end of the Maimonides dynasty in the 15th century. Additionally, forced conversions in Yemen, Eighth Crusade and Almohad massacres in North Africa, and the collapse of al-Andalus forced large number of Jews to resettle to Egypt, many of whom would join the Pietist movement enthusiastically. This enthusiasm may have been largely practical, as the adoption of Sufi ideas did much to ingratiate the Mamluk Jewish community with their Muslim overlords. This may have appealed to many of these refugees, as some historians state that the Maimonides dynasty itself originated from Al Andalus and resettled in Egypt.

Pietism would in some ways become indistinguishable from Sufism. Pietists would clean their hands and feet before praying in the temple. They would face Jerusalem as they prayed. They frequently practiced daytime fasting and group meditation or muraqaba.

There was vehement opposition to the revisionism of Pietism just as there was with Hasidism. Opposition was so strong there are records of Jews reporting fellow Jews to Muslim authorities on the grounds that they were practicing Islamic heresy. David Maimonides, brother of Obadyah and his heir, was eventually exiled to Palestine at the behest of other leaders in the Jewish community. Eventually Pietism fell out of favor in Egypt, as its leaders were exiled and Jewish immigration slowed.

Per Fenton, the influence of Sufism is still present in many Kabbalistic rituals, and some of the manuscripts authored under the Maimonides dynasty are still read and revered in Kabbalist circles.

== Ottoman rule (1517 to 1914) ==
On January 22, 1517, the Ottoman sultan, Selim I, defeated Tuman Bey, the last of the Mamelukes. He made radical changes in the governance of the Jewish community, abolishing the office of nagid, making each community independent, and placing David ben Solomon ibn Abi Zimra at the head of that of Cairo. He also appointed Abraham de Castro to be master of the mint. It was during the reign of Selim's successor, Suleiman the Magnificent, that Hain Ahmed Pasha, Viceroy of Egypt, revenged himself upon the Jews because de Castro had revealed in 1524 to the sultan of his designs for independence. The Cairo Purim of 28 Adar is still celebrated in commemoration of their escape.

Towards the end of the 16th century, Talmudic studies in Egypt were greatly fostered by Bezalel Ashkenazi, author of the Shiṭṭah Mequbbeṣet. Among his pupils were Isaac Luria, who as a young man had gone to Egypt to visit a rich uncle, the tax-farmer Mordecai Francis (Azulai, "Shem ha-Gedolim," No. 332); and Abraham Monson. Ishmael Kohen Tanuji finished his Sefer ha-Zikkaron in Egypt in 1543. Joseph ben Moses di Trani was in Egypt for a time (Frumkin, l.c. p. 69), as well as Ḥayyim Vital Aaron ibn Ḥayyim, the Biblical and Talmudical commentator (1609; Frumkin, l.c. pp. 71, 72). Of Isaac Luria's pupils, a Joseph Ṭabul is mentioned, whose son Jacob, a prominent man, was put to death by the authorities.

The 1648–1657 Khmelnytsky Uprising in Poland forced local Jews to flee to Ottoman lands, including Egypt. The responsa of Hakham Mordecai ha-Levi document how several Ashkenazi women, who arrived in Egypt and became agunot due to the chaos, faced challenges with the validity of their divorce documents. The rabbi accepted the documents, enabling the women to remarry.

According to Manasseh b. Israel from 1656, "The viceroy of Egypt has always at his side a Jew with the title zaraf bashi, or 'treasurer,' who gathers the taxes of the land. At present Abraham Alkula holds the position". He was succeeded by Raphael Joseph Çelebi, nagid of Egypt and rich friend and protector of Sabbatai Zevi. Sabbatai Zevi was twice in Cairo, the second time in 1660. It was there that he married Sarah Ashkenazi, who had been brought from Livorno. The Sabbatian movement naturally created a great stir in Egypt. It was in Cairo that Abraham Miguel Cardoso, the Sabbatian prophet and physician, settled in 1703, becoming physician to Kara Mehmed Pasha. In 1641 Samuel ben David, a Karaite, visited Egypt. The account of his journey supplies special information in regard to his fellow sectarians. He describes three synagogues of the Rabbinites at Alexandria and two at Rosetta. A second Karaite, Moses ben Elijah ha-Levi, has left a similar account of the year 1654, but it contains only a few points of special interest to the Karaites.

Joseph ben Isaac Sambari mentions a severe trial which came upon the Jews, due to a certain qāḍī al-ʿasākir ("generalissimo," not a proper name) sent from Constantinople to Egypt, who robbed and oppressed them, and whose death was in a certain measure occasioned by the graveyard invocation of one Moses of Damwah. This may have occurred in the 17th century. David Conforte was dayyan in Egypt in 1671.

In consequence of the Damascus affair, Moses Montefiore, Adolphe Crémieux, and Salomon Munk visited Egypt in 1840, and the last two did much to raise the intellectual status of their Egyptian brethren by the founding, in connection with Rabbi Moses Joseph Algazi, of schools in Cairo. According to the official census published in 1898 (i., xviii.), there were in Egypt 25,200 Jews in a total population of 9,734,405.

One famous Egyptian Jew of this period was Yaqub Sanu, who became a patriotic Egyptian nationalist advocating the removal of the British. He edited the nationalist publication Abu Naddara 'Azra from exile. This was one of the first magazines written in Egyptian Arabic, and mostly consisted of satire, poking fun at the British as well as the ruling Muhammad Ali dynasty, seen as puppets of the British.

At the turn of the 20th century, a Jewish observer noted with 'true satisfaction that a great spirit of tolerance sustains the majority of our fellow Jews in Egypt, and it would be difficult to find a more liberal population or one more respectful of all religious beliefs.’

== Modern times ==
=== Zionism ===
The Cairo Bar-Kochba Zionist Society (1897–1904), founded by Zionist activist Joseph Marco Barukh from Istanbul, was the first Zionist organization in Egypt and in the Islamic world. It was founded in 1897 by Joseph Marco Barukh, a Zionist activist from Istanbul who arrived in Egypt in 1896. It was the focal point of Zionist activity in Egypt at the turn of the 20th century.

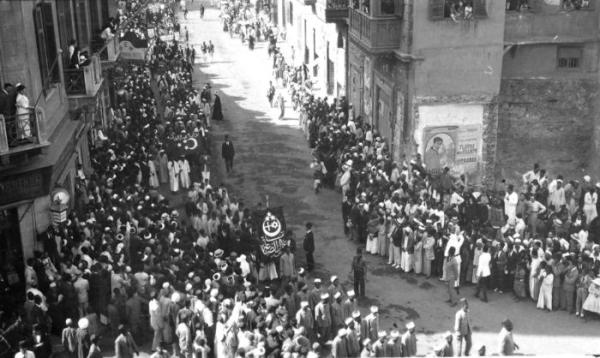
Demonstration in Egypt in 1919 holding the Egyptian flag with Crescent, the Cross and Star of David on it.

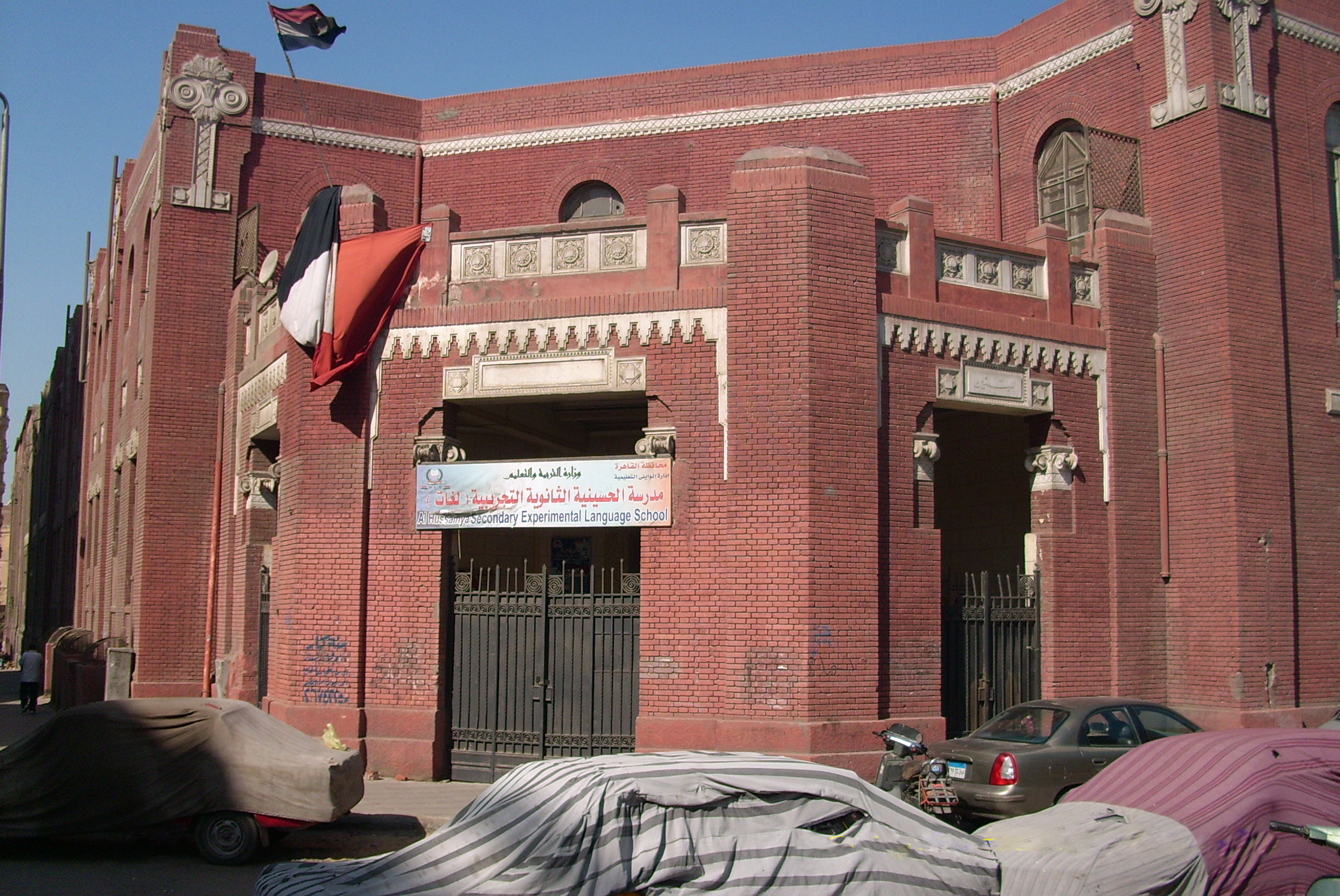
Former Jewish school, Abbasyia, Cairo

=== Since 1919 ===
During British rule, and under King Fuad I, Egypt was friendly towards its Jewish population, although between 86% and 94% of Jews in Egypt lacked citizenship. Jews played important roles in the economy, and their population climbed to nearly 80,000 as Jewish refugees settled there in response to increasing persecution in Europe. Many Jewish families, such as the Qatawi family, had extensive economic relations with non-Jews.

A sharp distinction had long existed between the respective Karaite and Rabbanite communities, among whom traditionally intermarriage was forbidden. They dwelt in Cairo in two contiguous areas, the former in the harat al-yahud al-qara’in, and the latter in the adjacent harat al-yahud quarter. Notwithstanding the division, they often worked together and the younger educated generation pressed for improving relations between the two.

Individual Jews played an important role in Egyptian nationalism. René Qatawi, leader of the Cairo Sephardi community, endorsed the creation in 1935 of the Association of Egyptian Jewish Youth, with its slogan: 'Egypt is our homeland, Arabic is our language.' Qattawi strongly opposed political Zionism and wrote a note on 'The Jewish Question' to the World Jewish Congress in 1943 in which he argued that Palestine would be unable to absorb Europe's Jewish refugees.

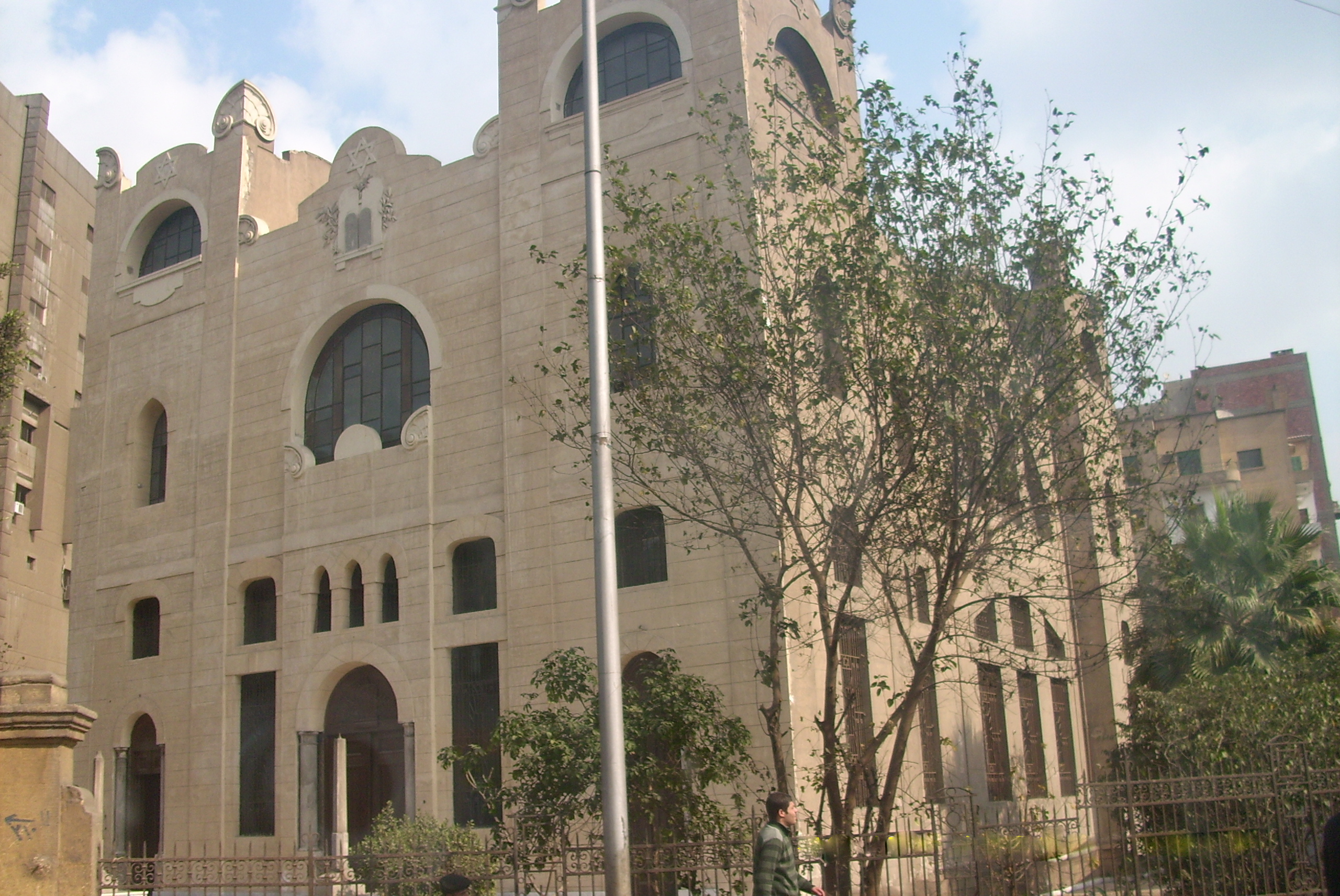
Synagogue in Abbasyia, Cairo

Nevertheless, various wings of the Zionist movement had representatives in Egypt. Karaite Jewish scholar Mourad Farag (1866–1956) was both an Egyptian nationalist and a passionate Zionist. His poem, 'My Homeland Egypt, Place of my Birth', expresses loyalty to Egypt, while his book, al-Qudsiyyat (Jerusalemica, 1923), defends the right of the Jews to a State. al-Qudsiyyat is perhaps the most eloquent defense of Zionism in the Arabic language. Mourad Farag was also one of the coauthors of Egypt's first Constitution in 1923.

Maccabi Cairo was a Jewish sports club based in Cairo that was active from 1932 until 1956. It was affiliated with the Maccabi World Union Jewish sports movement. The club had a number of branches and sports sections—including basketball and football. Its end was spurred by political upheaval and the exodus of Egypt's Jewish population.

In 1934, Saad Malki founded newspaper Ash-Shams (Arabic: الشمس, The Sun). The weekly was closed down by the Egyptian government in May 1948.

In 1937, the Egyptian government annulled the Capitulations, which gave foreign nationals a virtual status of exterritoriality: the minority groups affected were mainly from Syria, Greece, and Italy, ethnic Armenians, and some Jews who were nationals of other countries. The foreign nationals‘ immunity from taxation (mutamassir) had given the minority groups trading within Egypt highly favourable advantages. Many European Jews used Egyptian banks as a vehicle for transferring money from central Europe, not least those Jews escaping the Fascist regimes. In addition to this, many Jewish people living in Egypt were known to possess foreign citizenship, while those possessing Egyptian citizenship often had extensive ties to European countries.

The impact of the well-publicized 1936–1939 Arab revolt in Palestine, together with the rise of Nazi Germany, also began to affect previously positive Jewish relations with Egyptian society. The rise of local militant nationalistic societies like Young Egypt and the Muslim Brotherhood (also known as the Society of Muslim Brothers), who were sympathetic to the various models evinced by the Axis Powers in Europe, and organized themselves along similar lines, were also increasingly antagonistic to Jews. Groups including the Muslim Brotherhood circulated reports in Egyptian mosques and factories claiming that Jews and the British were destroying holy places in Jerusalem, as well as sending other false reports stating that hundreds of Arab women and children were being killed.

The leader of the popular liberal Wafd Party Mustafa al-Nahhas led the movement against Young Egypt's radicalism, going so far as to promise rabbi Chaim Nahum that if Egypt were to fall to Nazi Germany, Egypt would not enact any anti-Jewish laws. Nazi propagandist Wolfgang Diewerge struggled to spread antisemitism in Egypt in the 1930s, complaining that "The educational level of the broad masses is not advanced enough for them to understand racial theory. The awareness of the Jewish danger has not been roused here as yet". Haj Amin al-Husseini was influential in securing Nazi funds that were appropriated to the Muslim Brotherhood for the printing and distribution of thousands of antisemitic propaganda pamphlets.

The situation worsened in the late 1930s, with the growth of what Georges Bensoussan referred to as "Nazification," "propaganda," and "militant Judeophobia." In 1939, bombs were discovered in synagogues in Cairo.

1942–1943 saw with the arrival of Zionist emissaries from Palestine and Zionist activists among the Allied forces in Egypt. According to Joel Beinin, "because most Egyptian Jews were relatively secure and comfortable during the 1930s, few saw the point of risking their position by ostentatious support for Zionism", and those who did express support for Zionism rarely migrated to Palestine themselves.

In 1943 Henri Curiel founded the Egyptian Movement for National Liberation, an organization that was to form the core of the Egyptian Communist party. Curiel was later to play an important role in establishing early informal contacts between the PLO and Israel.

The Jewish quarter of Cairo was severely damaged in the 1945 Cairo pogrom. As the Partition of Palestine and the founding of Israel drew closer, hostility towards the Egyptian Jews strengthened, fed also by press attacks on all foreigners accompanying the rising ethnocentric nationalism of the age.

The legal nationality of the Jewish population at this period was and is a contentious point, as some authors have argued that most of the population were foreigners and not 'real' Egyptians. Egyptian censuses give the figures for the population of Jews as 63,550 in 1927, 62,953 in 1929 and 65,953 in 1947. (Note: It's been argued that after the 1947 Company Law, many Egyptian Jews applied for formal citizenship, thus inflating the 1947 census' findings. In reality, the law was promulgated on July 29th, published on August 4th and entered into force on November 4th. The census data was only focused on the population as of midnight on March 26th.) Najat Abdulhaq (2016) argues that a previously accepted figure of 5,000 Jews with Egyptian nationality is a politically motivated underestimate. The 1947 census had counted 50,831 Jews as Egyptian nationals; this number counted those who had lived in Egyptian for two generations, spoke Arabic and identified as Egyptian, not necessarily if they had the papers to prove it. Ironically, Jews who felt comfortable in identifying as Egyptians, even 'foreign' Sephardic Jews, did not feel the need to register themselves, while Ashkenazi Jews who fled pogroms in Europe were more keen to possess papers.

In 1947, the Company Law set quotas for employing Egyptian nationals in incorporated firms, requiring that 75% of salaried employees, and 90% of all workers, must be Egyptian. As Jews were often considered foreign or stateless persons, this constrained Jewish and foreign-owned entrepreneurs to reduce recruitment for employment positions from their own ranks. The law also required that just over half of the paid-up capital of joint stock companies be Egyptian. Worst of all, its effect was to automatically exclude almost all Egyptian Jews from employment. Although an estimated 90% of Jews living in Egypt had been born there, only 7% - about 5,000 - qualified as Egyptian under the new law. Even that 7% could not get hired: as a subsequent United Nations report noted, "employment is interpreted as applying only to Egyptian Moslems."

The Egyptian Prime Minister Nuqrashi told the British ambassador: "All Jews were potential Zionists [and] ... anyhow all Zionists were Communists". On 24 November 1947, the head of the Egyptian delegation to the UN General Assembly, Muhammad Hussein Heykal Pasha, said that "the lives of 1,000,000 Jews in Moslem countries would be jeopardized by the establishment of a Jewish state." Heykal Pasha continued:

"if the United Nations decides to amputate a part of Palestine in order to establish a Jewish state, no force on earth could prevent blood from flowing there ... one such bloodshed has commenced, no force on earth can confine it to the borders of Palestine itself. If Arab blood is shed in Palestine, Jewish blood will necessarily be shed elsewhere in the Arab world despite all the sincere efforts of the governments concerned to prevent such reprisals to place in certain and serious danger a million Jews."

Mahmud Bey Fawzi said: "Imposed partition was sure to result in bloodshed in Palestine and in the rest of the Arab world". Hasan al-Banna said on August 1, 1948 "If the Jewish state becomes a fact, and this is realized by the Arab peoples, they will drive the Jews who live in their midst into the sea ... We sympathize with the homeless Jews but it is not humane that they should be settled where they render homeless other people who have been settled for thousands of years".

=== After the foundation of Israel in 1948 ===
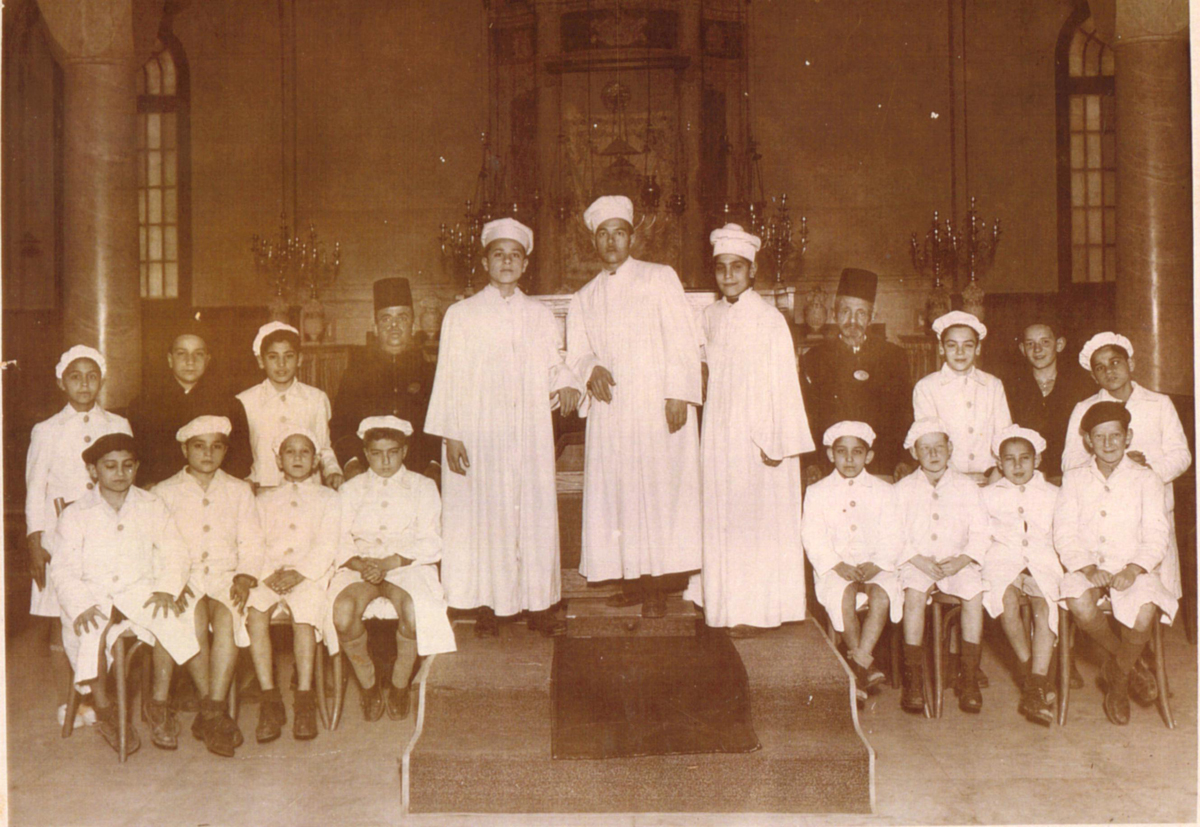
Egyptian Alexandria Jewish choir of Rabbin Moshe Cohen at Samuel Menashe synagogue. Alexandria.

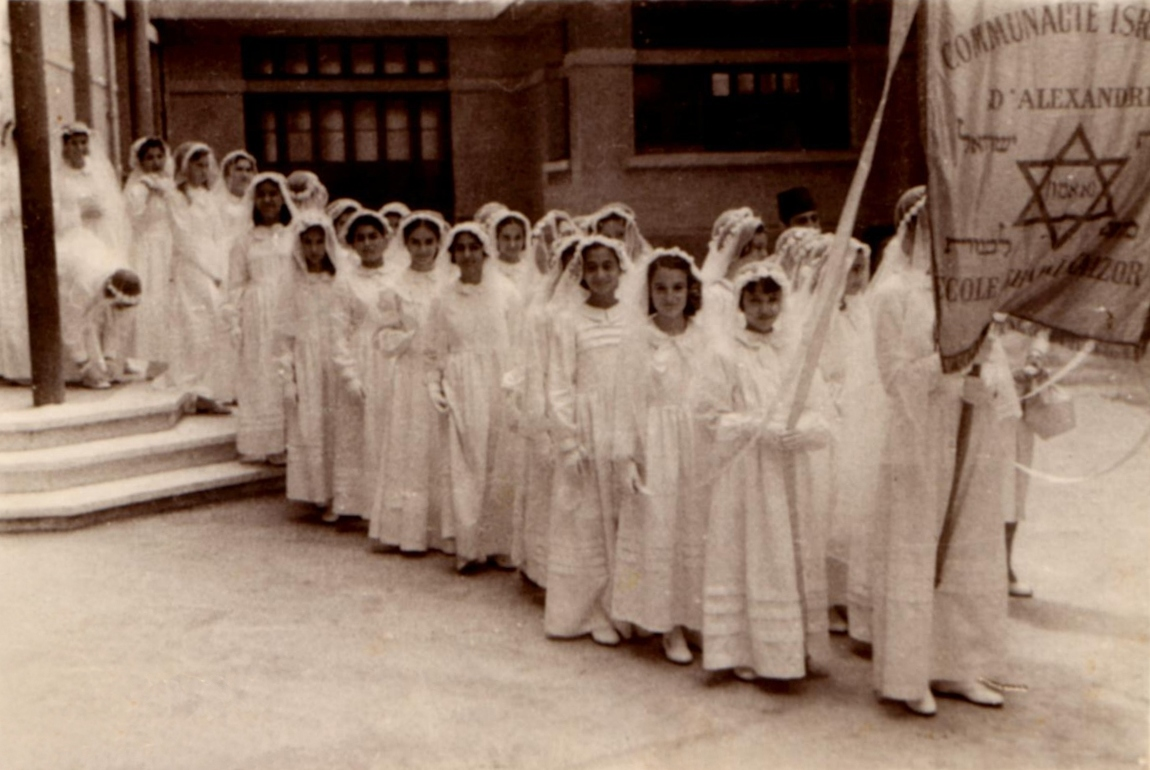
Jewish girls from Alexandria in 1955 for their Confirmation service, a ritual similar to a Bat Mitzvah

After the foundation of Israel in 1948, and the subsequent 1948 Arab–Israeli War, in which Egypt participated, difficulties multiplied for Egyptian Jews, most of whom were Mutamassirun (Egyptianized European immigrants), and who then numbered 75,000. That year, bombings of Jewish areas killed 70 Jews and wounded nearly 200, while riots claimed many more lives. Anti-Jewish riots became increasingly common from 1948 to 1952. During the Arab-Israeli war, the Cicurel department store near Cairo's Opera Square was firebombed. The government helped with funds to rebuild it, but it was again burnt down in 1952, and eventually passed into Egyptian control. Amidst the violence, many Egyptian Jews emigrated abroad. By 1950, nearly 40% of Egypt's Jewish population had emigrated. About 14,000 of them went to Israel, and the rest to other countries.

The 1954 Lavon Affair was an Israeli state-sponsored terrorist operation designed to discredit and overthrow the then Egyptian president Gamal Abdel Nasser and to end secret negotiations with Egypt being pursued by then Israeli prime minister Moshe Sharett, who did not know of the operation. Sharett did not learn the truth until after he had denounced the charges by the Egyptian government in a speech in the Knesset as a blood libel, which caused him to feel deep humiliation that he had lied to the world, and was one factor in Sharett's resignation as prime minister. The operation blew up Western targets (without causing any deaths), led to deeper distrust of Jews—key agents in the operation had been recruited from the Egyptian Jewish community—and led to sharply increased emigration of Jews from Egypt and the State Security Investigations Service increased its surveillance on Jewish neighborhoods across Egypt, sometimes raiding homes of Jewish families. In his summing up statement Fu’ad al-Digwi, the prosecutor at the trial of captured operatives, repeated the official government stance: "The Jews of Egypt are living among us and are sons of Egypt. Egypt makes no difference between its sons whether Muslims, Christians, or Jews. These defendants happen to be Jews who reside in Egypt, but we are trying them because they committed crimes against Egypt, although they are Egypt's sons."

Two members of the ring, Dr. Moshe Marzouk and Shmuel Azzar, were sentenced to death. In 1953, a cousin of Marzouk, Kamal Massuda, was killed, and the authorities did not make arrests. Other members of the sabotage rings had families who lost their livelihood after the 1947 Company Laws were implemented, which severely restricted the right to work and to own companies of non-Egyptian citizens. (Jews were not in general allowed citizenship.)

In the immediate aftermath of trilateral invasion on 23 November 1956 by Britain, France, and Israel (known as the Suez Crisis), some 25,000 Jews, almost half of the Jewish community left for Israel, Europe, the United States, and South America, after being forced to sign declarations that they were leaving "voluntarily" and to agree to the confiscation of their assets. Some 1,000 more Jews were imprisoned. Similar measures were enacted against British and French nationals in retaliation for the invasion. In Joel Beinin's summary: "Between 1919 and 1956, the entire Egyptian Jewish community, like the Cicurel firm, was transformed from a national asset into a fifth column." Hundreds of Jews were arrested or detained without charges, imprisoned, or interned in Jewish schools. Jews were also denaturalized, i.e. deprived of their Egyptian citizenship, and had their assets sequestered. Some Egyptian and stateless Jews were expelled from Egypt, creating a refugee crisis.

After 1956, prominent families, like the Qattawis, were left with only a fraction of the social clout they had once enjoyed, if they could remain in Egypt at all. Ironically, Jews like Rene Qattawi were in full support of establishing an Arab-Egyptian nationalism, and were opposed to the rise of Zionism and the establishment of the State of Israel. Nonetheless, even this social elite of the Jewish population was not believed to have any place in the new Egyptian regime.

From 1956 to 1970, under the Nasser regime, the military government of Egypt and its agents monitored the Jewish population, implementing measures such as police detention, and arresting suspects. Jewish families in Cairo and Alexandria were held in confinement at their homes for lengthy periods of time, often without funds, food, or other supplies, and were under surveillance by building concierges who had police authority to control Jewish tenants The SSIS perpetrated much of these acts.

UN High Commissioner for Refugees Auguste Lindt stated in his Report to the UNREF Executive Committee's Fourth Session (Geneva 29 January to 4 February 1957) "Another emergency problem is now arising: that of refugees from Egypt. There is no doubt in my mind that those refugees from Egypt who are not able, or not willing, to avail themselves of the protection of the Government of their nationality fall under the mandate of my office."

The last chief Rabbi of Egypt was Haim Moussa Douek, who served from 1960 until he left Egypt in 1972. After the Six-Day War in 1967, more confiscations took place. Rami Mangoubi, who lived in Cairo at the time, said that nearly all Egyptian Jewish men between the ages of 17 and 60 were either thrown out of the country immediately, or taken to the detention centers of Abou Za'abal and Tura, where they were incarcerated and tortured for more than three years. The eventual result was the almost-complete disappearance of the 3,000-year-old Jewish community in Egypt; the vast majority of Jews left the country. Most Egyptian Jews fled to Israel (35,000), Brazil (15,000), France (10,000), the US (9,000) and Argentina (9,000). A letter published by the Jerusalem Post from Dr. E. Jahn, of the Office of the UN High Commissioner for Refugees stated: "I refer to our recent discussion concerning Jews from Middle Eastern and North African countries in consequence of recent events. I am now able to inform you that such persons may be considered prima facie within the mandate of this Office."

The last Jewish wedding in Egypt took place in 1984.

=== 21st century ===
According to a 2009 report by the Anti-Defamation League, antisemitic and anti-Israel sentiments continued to run high. Israel and Zionism were frequently associated with conspiracy theories of subverting and weakening the state. Nevertheless, the Egyptian government began renovating an old dilapidated synagogue that year in what was once a Jewish neighborhood in Old Cairo. Zahi Hawass, general secretary of the Supreme Council of Antiquities, said: "If you don't restore the Jewish synagogues, you lose part of your history."

The Jewish population continued to dwindle. In 2007, an estimated 200 Jews lived in Egypt, less than 40 in 2014, but by 2017 this dropped to 18: 6 in Cairo, 12 in Alexandria. In 2018, the estimated Jewish population was 10. In 2019 three Jews in Egypt applied for Spanish citizenship In April 2021, one of the last members of the community, Albert Arie, died aged 90; he had converted to Islam, married an Egyptian Muslim woman, and was buried as a Muslim. One of the four remaining Jews in Egypt, Reb Yosef Ben-Gaon of Alexandria, died in November 2021. In 2022 there were a reported 22 Jews in Egypt

In March 2022, part of the Jews of Cairo archives were confiscated by the Egyptian government. As of December 2022, there are only 5 Egyptian Jews living in Egypt, all women, of whom the youngest Magda Haroun (born 1952) is the community leader, who is an anti-Zionist and married to a Catholic. Her two daughters are not living in Egypt. Her sister Nadia, the former deputy leader of the community and one of its youngest remaining members, died in 2014.

In 2020, the Eliyahu Hanavi Synagogue in Alexandria was restored, and in April 2022, restoration work began on the Ben Ezra Synagogue, as part of government efforts to resurrect Egypt's dwindling Jewish heritage.

== Works by Egyptian Jews on their communities ==
- Matalon, Ronit. Zeh 'im ha-panim eleynu ('The one facing us') (novel of life in an Egyptian Jewish family).
- Misriya (pseudonym of Giselle Littman, Bat Ye'or), Yahudiya (1974) [1971]. in the Hebrew trans.Yehudei mitzrayim (ed.). Les juifs en Egypte: Aperçu sur 3000 ans d'histoire (Editions de l'Avenir ed.). Geneva.
- Teboul, Victor (2002). Éditions les Intouchables (ed.). "La Lente découverte de l'étrangeté". Montreal.
- Lucette Lagnado (2008). The Man in the White Sharkskin Suit. Harper Collins. ISBN 9780060822187. (an autobiography of a Jewish family during their years in Egypt and after they emigrated to the United States)
- Mangoubi, Rami (May 31, 2007). "My Longest 10 Minutes". The Jerusalem Post Magazine. A Cairo Jewish boyhood during and after the Six-Day War.
- Aciman, Andre (1994). Out of Egypt. Picador. ISBN 9780312426552.
- Carasso, Lucienne (2014). Growing Up Jewish in Alexandria: The Story of a Sephardic Family's Exodus from Egypt. New York. ISBN 9781500446352.
- Mizrahi, Dr Maurice M. (2004). "Growing Up Under Pharaoh".
- Mizrahi, Dr Maurice M. (2012). "History of the Jews of Egypt" (PDF).
- Dammond, Liliane (2007). The Lost World of the Egyptian Jews: First-person Accounts from Egypt's Jewish Community In the Twentieth Century. (oral history project based on interviews with more than two dozen exiled Egyptian Jews)
- Teboul, Ph.D., Victor. "Revisiting Tolerance. Lessons Drawn from Egypt's Cosmopolitan Heritage".

== Egyptian Jews in literature ==
- Kamal Ruhayyim's Gamal trilogy (Diary of a Jewish Muslim, Days in the Diaspora, and Menorahs and Minarets) portrays the life of an Egyptian boy, son of a Jewish mother.
- The Book of Genesis and the Book of Exodus from the Hebrew Bible depict the Israelites, ancestors of Jews, as having resided in ancient Egypt for a lengthy period of time. The narrative describes the patriarch Jacob and his twelve sons (progenitors of the Twelve Tribes of Israel) settling in Egypt, with their descendants later forced into slavery. Eventually, the prophet Moses demands, multiple times, that the unnamed pharaoh free the Israelites. The pharaoh only relents after God sends down ten plagues that devastate Egypt. Moses leads the Israelites out of Egypt, eventually arriving at Canaan, which they then conquer.

== Notable Egyptian Jews ==
- André Aciman, writer and academic
- Guy Béart, French singer
- Eli Cohen, celebrated Israeli spy
- Sir Ronald Cohen, Egyptian-born businessman
- Zaki Harari (1926–1979), Egyptian Olympic basketball player
- Jacques Hassoun, psychoanalyst, writer
- Aura Herzog, widow of sixth Israeli president Chaim Herzog
- Eric Hobsbawm, historian (Jewish-Polish and -German parents living in Cairo)
- Isaac Israeli ben Solomon, physician and philosopher
- Edmond Jabès, poet
- Paula Jacques, writer, journalist, radio show producer
- Jacqueline Kahanoff, writer
- Ranan Lurie, political cartoonist
- Moshe Marzouk, doctor
- Togo Mizrahi, film director, actor, writer, and producer
- Roland Moreno, engineer, inventor of the Smart Card
- Layla Murad, singer
- Haim Saban, TV producer
- Saadia ben Yosef, rabbi
- Sylvain Sylvain (Sylvain Mizrahi), guitarist for New York Dolls
- Bat Ye'or, historian
- Avraham Yosef, rabbi
- Yaakov Yosef, rabbi
- Ahmed Zayat, entrepreneur and owner of Zayat Stables LLC

== See also ==
- History of the Jews in Africa

=== Regions ===
- History of the Jews in Central Africa
- History of the Jews in East Africa
- History of the Jews in North Africa
- History of the Jews in Southern Africa
- History of the Jews in West Africa

=== Ancient history ===
- Elephantine papyri
  - Jewish temple at Elephantine
- Land of Onias
- Philo

=== Modern history ===
- List of Jews from the Arab world
- Antisemitism in the Arab world
- Antisemitism in Islam
- History of the Jews in Africa
- History of the Jews under Muslim rule
- Islamic–Jewish relations
- Suez Crisis
- Egypt–Israel peace treaty
- Egypt–Israel relations
- Jewish exodus from the Muslim world
- 1956–1957 exodus and expulsions from Egypt
- Mizrahi Jews in Israel
- Jews of Egypt (film)
- Pallache family
- Racism in the Arab world
- Racism in Muslim communities
- Religion in Egypt
- Xenophobia and racism in the Middle East

=== Institutions ===
- List of synagogues in Egypt
  - Ben Ezra Synagogue in Cairo
  - Eliyahu Hanavi Synagogue in Alexandria
  - Sha'ar Hashamayim Synagogue in Cairo
- Tomb of rabbi Yaakov Abuhatzeira in Damanhur
- Cairo Geniza
