= Magda Haroun =

Egyptian politician (born 1952)

Magda Tania Haroun (born 1952) is the head of the minuscule Jewish Community of Egypt. (There are currently five Jewish residents in all of Egypt.) She is the successor of Carmen Weinstein, who had led the community for 20 years until her death in 2013. She is an anti-Zionist, and the daughter of nationalist Egyptian Jewish lawyer and politician Chehata Haroun. She has two daughters and is currently married to a Catholic. Her sister Nadia, deputy leader of the community and one of its youngest remaining members died in 2014.

She is also one of the heads of Drop of Milk, an organization dedicated to preserving Jewish heritage in Egypt.

== See also ==
- History of the Jews in Egypt
