= 1945 anti-Jewish riots in Egypt =

Balfour Day riots
- Part of November 1945 anti-Jewish riots
- Location: Alexandria and Cairo, Kingdom of Egypt
- Date: 2–3 November 1945
- Target: Egyptian Jews
- Attack type: Violent pogrom, massacre
- Deaths: 5 Egyptian Jews, one policeman
- Injuries: 400 to 670 wounded
- Perpetrators: Young Egypt Party, Muslim Brotherhood

The Balfour Day riots took place in Egypt on 2 and 3 November 1945. The riots began as anti-Jewish demonstrations on the 28th anniversary of the Balfour Declaration and were organised by the right-wing Young Egypt Party and Hassan al-Banna's Muslim Brotherhood.

Before the 1936-1939 Arab revolt in Palestine, Egyptian Jews were considered more or less citizens of Egypt. However, starting around the 1930s, conservative movements started to associate Egyptian Jews with Zionism. The Society of Muslim Brothers and Young Egypt called for a boycott of Egyptian Jewish merchants. Young Egypt did not consider Jews "real Egyptians" and urged its followers to "buy Egyptian"; some of its supporters were arrested for spreading anti-Jewish propaganda and attempting to bomb Jewish neighborhoods.

Egyptian authorities tried to prevent the demonstrations on 2 November, and provided police to protect Jewish places in Cairo and Alexandria. Yet this proved to be insufficient; 20 thousand people incited by the Wafd Party, Muslim Brothers, the Young Men's Muslim Association and Young Egypt, marched from Al Azhar to the king's residence in Abdeen Palace. The initial demonstration at 10 a.m was peaceful and orderly. However, by 1 p.m they were joined by rioters who spent the previous few hours looting Jewish and European shops; non-Jewish shopkeepers were threatened to close their shops.

While the leader of the Muslim Brothers Hasan Al-Banna tried to disperse the crowd, the rioters marched into the commercial district and looted shops and homes in the Jewish quarter. An Ashkenazi synagogue was burned down; the Greek Orthodox patriarchate, Catholic churches and a Coptic school were also damaged in the riot. Five Egyptian Jews and one Muslim policeman were killed in Alexandria, hundreds were injured in both Alexandria and Cairo, with smaller demonstrations in Mansura, Port Said, and Tanta. The police reacted quickly but were unable to prevent much of the violence, since they were ordered to not use their firearms. However further demonstrations planned for the following day were largely suppressed. In total, 400 hundred were injured, one policeman and five Jews were killed and around £1 million of property was damaged.

== Aftermath ==
Demonstrations that were planned for the next day were suppressed, as Cairene Jews formed self-defense units and built road blocks. Around three hundred looters were taken to court. Following the riots, King Farouk of Egypt denounced the violence and met with Rabbi Chaim Nahum, whilst Prime Minister Mahmoud an-Nukrashi Pasha also denounced the violence and visited a number of the riot sites, although Nukrashi cast blame on Zionists for having "provoked such violent reactions." Chaim Nahum initially resisted calls to denounce Zionism, yet caved on the 9th. The secretary-general of the Arab League Azzam Pasha also denounced the riot, as well of most the Egyptian press. The governor of Cairo offered to pay to restore everything that was destroyed, including the synagogue. By January 1946, dozens of rioters were convicted and sent to prison.

The historian Gudrun Krämer writes that:

"Yet in spite of the Balfour Day riots of November 1945 and some isolated incidents occurring in their wake, the mass of the Egyptian population did not show signs of anti-Jewish feeling. The anti-Zionist campaign of militant nationalist and Islamic groups with its anti-Jewish overtones did not seem to affect the general public, nor did it lead to any government action directed against Egyptian Jews."

Numerous acts of violence against Egyptian Jews followed in the later years, including the 1948 bombings of Jewish areas; while the government failed to protect Jews during the attacks, the Muslim Brotherhood was banned on 9 December, causing an escalation in the violence between the Nukrashi government and Hasan al-Banna's organization. Nukrashi was assassinated by 28 December; Banna was assassinated by February the next year. During the 1950s, the Jews of Egypt were subjected to political instability due to ongoing Israeli-Egyptian conflict (particularly the Suez Crisis) and suffered sporadic violence, leading to the exodus of most of the community.

== See also ==
- 1945 anti-Jewish riots in Tripolitania
- Antisemitism in the Arab world § Egypt

== Sources ==
- Beinin, Joel (1998). The Dispersion of Egyptian Jewry: Culture, Politics. and the Formation of Modern Diaspora. University of California Press. ISBN 9780520211759.
- Krämer, Gudrun (1989). The Jews in Modern Egypt, 1914-1952. University of Washington Press. ISBN 9780295967950.
- Laskier, Michael (1993). The Jews of Egypt, 1920-1970: In the Midst of Zionism, Anti-Semitism, and the Middle East Conflict. NYU Press. ISBN 9780814750780.
- Schrand, Irmgard (2003). Jews in Egypt: Communists and Citizens. University of Virginia. ISBN 9783825875169.
