= Maltese Egyptians =

Maltese in Egypt
- (Malta) (Egypt)
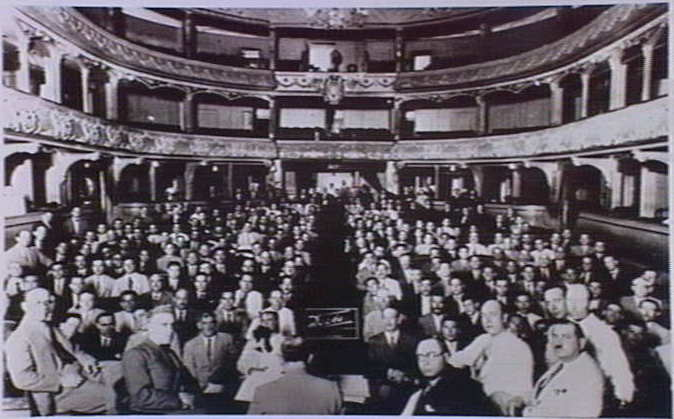
- The formation of the Maltese Community Council of Alexandria, Egypt, at the Alhambra Theatre, Alexandria, 1925

Regions with significant populations
- Formerly Alexandria, Cairo, Rosetta, Suez, Port Said

Languages
- French, Maltese, English, Arabic

Religion
- Roman Catholic

Related ethnic groups
- Maltese diaspora

The Maltese of Egypt, also known as Egyptian Franco-Maltese, are an ethnic minority group in Egypt. Though culturally very similar to the Franco-Maltese of Tunisia and Algeria, most people of Maltese or part-Maltese descent born in Egypt remained British subjects. They are immigrants, or descendants of immigrants, from the islands of Malta, who settled in Egypt largely during the nineteenth and early twentieth centuries, and intermarried heavily with Italians, French and other Europeans. Those with a French father assumed French citizenship. Some Maltese had been present in the country as early as the era of Napoleon and his conquest of Egypt. The proximity between the two countries and the similarity between the Maltese and Arabic languages have led many Maltese to settle in Egypt in the past, mainly in Alexandria. Like the Italians who settled in Egypt, the Egypt-born Maltese constituted a portion of Egypt's Roman Catholic community. By 1939, up to 20,000 Maltese were living in Egypt. Practically all of these were French-speaking, and those with a French parent had French as their mother tongue. In many middle-class families (especially in Alexandria and Cairo) a language shift had occurred, with Italian used as the home language alongside French; a large minority of Egyptian Maltese (for example those of the Suez Canal Zone) still retained Maltese as their mother tongue. This number was greatly reduced by emigration years after, and almost completely wiped out by expulsions in 1956 due to the Maltese being British nationals. Most of the Egyptian Franco-Maltese settled in Australia or Britain, where they remained culturally distinct from immigrants from Malta. Those with French citizenship were repatriated to France. Post-war Malta in general did not accept refugees from Egypt.

== History ==
Catholic Malta and predominantly Muslim North Africa have had troubled relations since at least the Crusades, when Malta became the final stand against the Turks by the Knights Hospitallers. Malta held, and after the Crusades many attacks against Arab and Turkish coastal towns were launched from it. Not all of the Maltese who joined the Knights in these attacks returned home. Some lost their liberty, settling against their will in North Africa.

The Knights remained in possession of Malta until its seizure by Napoleon Bonaparte in 1798. Bonaparte formed a troop of Maltese—the number of men varies in sources from 400 or 500 to 2000—who went with him into Egypt as part of the Mediterranean campaign of 1798. Many of these men settled in the Eastern Mediterranean after Napoleon's loss at the Battle of the Nile, becoming some of the first Maltese settlers in Egypt. Opportunity for work with the British drew more Maltese into the area thereafter, although there was an exodus of Maltese refugees back to their native land in 1882, when Alexandria was besieged by the British. Nevertheless, Alexandria, Cairo, Suez, Rosetta and Port Said continued to be a draw for Maltese settlers.

Maltese immigrants joined the many others who flocked to the area for work in 1859 with the construction of the Suez Canal. The Egyptian Maltese community was heavily employed in such construction areas as masonry, carpentry, and smithing as well as in administration and commerce. Many became employees of the French Suez Canal Company. As English was known to some and they were quicker than other Europeans to learn Arabic, they proved useful to British employers. Language became a major focus of the Maltese work force. While many had left their homes illiterate, speaking Maltese, they sent their children to French Catholic schools where they developed fluency not only in French, which became the principal language of the subsequent generations, but also in English and Arabic. This education made them useful both in consular work and to European companies entering the area.

Relations between the Maltese immigrants and the Egyptian population were not always easy. In Alexandria in 1882, a fight between a Maltese immigrant and an Egyptian donkey driver, in which the donkey driver was killed, led the Egyptians to riot. As word spread that the Europeans were killing Egyptians the residents took to the streets. They met return fire from Europeans, Greeks, Syrians and other Christians, with violence continuing until finally the army was called in to intervene.

In 1926, there were nearly 20,000 Maltese residents living and working in Egypt. However, the Suez Crisis of 1956, when Malta was used as a point of deployment by the British and French for troops to invade Egypt, was followed by the expulsion of Maltese immigrants, along with many other groups, from the country.

Egyptian Maltese, like the very similar Tunisian Maltese and Algerian Maltese varieties, is an archaic form of the language, characterized by the preservation of late nineteenth-century features (including numerous Italian lexical elements now replaced by English loanwords in the Maltese of Malta), a large number of borrowings from French and a small number of Arabic loanwords and expressions relating to life in Egypt. As a majority of Egyptian-born Maltese had origins in the Cottonera (Three Cities) harbourside district of Malta, Cottoneran dialectalisms are another feature distinguishing Egyptian Maltese from the current metropolitan standard variety of the language.
