= List of Egyptian writers =

This is a list of Egyptian writers.

== A ==
- Fekry Pasha Abaza (1896–1979)
- Aziz Pasha Abaza (1898–1973)
- Tharwat Abaza (1927–2002)
- Duaa Abdelrahman (1979–)
- Abdel Rahman El Abnudi (1938–2015)
- Ahmed Zaki Abu Shadi (1892–1955)
- Yasser Abdel Hafez (1969– )
- Ibrahim Abdel Meguid (1946– )
- Ihsan Abdel Quddous (1919–1990)
- Yahya Taher Abdullah (1938–1981)
- Hamdy Abowgliel
- Yusuf Abu Rayya (1955–2009)
- Tatamkulu Afrika (1920–2002), also connected with South Africa
- Abdel Rahim Ahmed
- Leila Ahmed (1940– )
- Abbas Al Akkad (1889–1964)
- Jamila al-'Alayili (1907–1991)
- Edwar al-Kharrat (1926–2015)
- Muhammad Aladdin, novelist, short story writer and script writer
- Ahmed Alaidy (1974– )
- Idris Ali (1940–2010)
- Karim Alrawi
- Amenemope (author)
- Amenhotep
- Samir Amin (1931–2018)
- Apion
- Apollonius of Egypt
- Gaber Asfour (1944–2021)
- Radwa Ashour (1946–2014)
- Alaa Al Aswany (1957– )
- Asclepiades Mendes

== B ==
- Hala el Badry
- Kerolos Bahgat
- Salwa Bakr
- Sherin Hanaey
- Hussein Bassir, archaeologist
- Siham Bayoumi

== C ==
- Chaeremon of Alexandria
- Constantine Cavafy
- Andrée Chedid (1920–2011), poet and novelist^{[Killam & Rowe]}

== D ==
- Doha Assy

== E ==
- Ragab Elbanna (1936- )
- Abo El Seoud El Ebiary (1910–1969)
- Mohammad Elsannour
- Mansoura Ez Eldin (1976– )
- Radwa El Aswad (1974– )

== F ==
- Fawzia Fahim (1931– )
- Fawziya Mahran (1931–2019)
- Nabil Farouk (1956–2020)

== G ==
- Fathy Ghanem (1924–1998), novelist, journalist and editor^{[Killam & Rowe]}
- Gamal Al-Ghitani (1945–2015)
- Sayed Gouda
- Mohammed Lotfy Gomaa (1886–1953)
- Moawad GadElrab (1929–1983)

== H ==
- Mohammad Moustafa Haddara (1930–1997)
- Tawfik El Hakim (1898–1987), playwright^{[Killam & Rowe]}
- Yehia Hakki (1905–1992), short-story writer, novelist, critic
- Muhammad Husayn Haykal (1909–1956)
- Hephaestion of Thebes
- Ihab Husni (1966– )
- Taha Hussein (1889–1973)

== I ==
- Hafez Ibrahim (1872–1932)
- Sonallah Ibrahim (1937– )
- Yusuf Idris (1927–1991)

== J ==
- Edmond Jabès (1912–1991)

== K ==
- Ahmed Kafafi
- Ezzat el Kamhawi (1961– )
- Lutis Abd Al Karim
- Ahmad Al-Khamisi (1948– )
- Edwar al-Kharrat (1926–2015)
- Out el Kouloub

== L ==
- Leon of Pella
- Lysimachus of Alexandria

== M ==
- Naguib Mahfouz (1911–2006), novelist, short story writer and playwright; awarded the 1988 Nobel Prize in Literature^{[Killam & Rowe]}
- Mustafa Mahmud (1921–2009)
- Zaki Naguib Mahmoud (1905–1993)
- Abd Al Rasheed Al Sadiq Mahmmudi
- Mustafa Lutfi al-Manfaluti (1876–1924)
- Ahmad Al Mallawani
- Anis Mansour (1925–2011)
- Ibrahim al-Mazini (1889–1949)
- Iman Mersal
- Ahmed Mourad (1978– )
- Salama Moussa (1887–1958)
- Ra'ouf Mus'ad (1937– )

== N ==
- Noor Naga
- Mohamed Nagui (1947–2014)
- Nicos Nicolaides (1884–1956)
- Naguib Mahfouz (1911–2006)

== P ==
- Pamphile of Epidaurus

== Q ==
- Rawhiya al-Qallini (1915–1980)
- Abdel Hakim Qasem (1934–1990)
- Sayyid Qutb (1906–1966)
- Abd al-Qadir Qitt (1916–c. 2002)

== R ==
- Somaya Ramadan (1951–2024)
- Alifa Rifaat (1930–1996)

== S ==
- Nawâl El Saadâwi (1931–2021), feminist writer and activist^{[Killam & Rowe]}
- Mekkawi Said (1956–2017), novelist and short story writer
- Salama Ahmed Salama (1932–2012), journalist and author
- Ibtihal Salem (1949–2015), short story writer, novelist and translator
- Muhammad Jamal Saqr (1966– ), poet
- Khairy Shalaby (1938–2011), novelist and author
- Ahmed Shawqi (1868–1932), poet laureate
- Gilbert Sinoué (1947– ), guitarist and author
- Sobekemsaf
- Laila Soliman (1981– ), playwright
- Ahdaf Soueif (1950– ), novelist and political and cultural commentator

== T ==
- Miral al-Tahawy
- Bahaa Taher (1935–2022)
- Ahmed Khaled Tawfik (1962–2018)
- Sahar Tawfiq
- Sherin Hanaey
- Aisha Taymur
- May Telmissany
- Munira Thabit (1902–1967), first woman lawyer in Egypt, journalist and writer
- Affaf Tobbala (1941– )
- Ahmad Khaled Towfeq (1962–2018)

== V ==
- Mireille Vincendon (1910–?), French-language poet and writer

== Z ==
- Amina Zaydan (1966– )
- May Ziadeh (1886–1941)
- Youssef Ziedan (1958– )

== See also ==
- List of African writers by country
- List of Egyptian-American writers
- List of Egyptian women writers
