= Sherin Hanaey =

Egyptian writer

- شيرين أحمد هنائي
- Citizenship: Egypt
- Writing career
- Language: Arabic; Egyptian Arabic
- Genre: Writing | philosophical horror

Sherine Ahmed Hanaei (Arabic: شيرين هنائي) is an Egyptian novelist and screenwriter, She graduated from the Faculty of Fine Arts, Department of Graphics and Animation, and She writes in the field of philosophical horror.

== Published works ==
- The dark banned tales series.
- Novel Moon dough.
- Novel Death another day.
- Novel Necrophilia, 2011.
- Novel dolls box, 2011.
- Novel Tughra's, 2014.
- Novel Wolves of Yellowstone.
- Novel travel endings.
- Novel playgrounds shadow.

== Series ==
- The series Farah: It is a series that uses "stop motion" technology in a new dress that has not been used before in Egypt and the Arab world. It is directed by Mukhtar Talaat. Scenario and dialogue by Sherine Hanaei, Ahmed Hamdy and Reem Al-Maqash, Ramy Subhi's brides, and produced by Abdel Hakim Talat It took a year and eight months to work on it.
- Sinuhe series: an animated series of a Pharaonic child who has lived in a long time for more than 7 thousand years, with his appearance and old clothes and the dry desert of Egypt with his friends "Habi and Titi Sherry", and Sherine directed a number of episodes of the series.
- The series Hakaza Kan Elnaby: An animated series that was shown in Ramadan 2021, and Sherine worked as a writer for the series.
- The series Rooq Ya Marzouq: It is a cartoon work that restores one of the most famous Arab comedians represented by the late artist Hassan Ibrahim, some 23 years after it was last presented before his death, and Sherine worked as his director for the work.
- The series Hara Umm Dunia: The series revolves around a comic social framework about characters from reality who fall into many problems. It stars Sawsan Badr, Salah Abdallah and Ahmed Al-Saadani, and Sherine worked as a writer and director for the series.
- Umm Logy series: It is an animated series whose episodes are shown on the YouTube platform.

== See also ==
- Ahmed Mourad
- Radwa El Aswad
- Rasha Adly
- List of Egyptian authors
- List of Egyptian writers
