= Days in the Diaspora =

Egyptian novel by Kamal Ruhayyim

- First edition
- Author: Kamal Ruhayyim
- Original title: أيام الشتات
- Translator: Sarah Enany
- Language: English
- Genre: Historical Fiction
- Publisher: The American University in Cairo Press
- Publication date: 2008
- English publication date: 2012
- Pages: 308
- ISBN: 978-9774165375

Days in the Diaspora is a 2008 book by Egyptian author Kamal Ruhayyim, translated into English in 2012.

It constitutes the second part of the "Galal trilogy", dealing with the life of Galal, an Egyptian man with a Muslim father and a Jewish mother. The unforgiving 1960s lead Galal and his family to exile in Paris, where he endures several hardships.

This book was translated into English by Sarah Enany and published by AUC Press.

== See also ==
- 1956–57 exodus and expulsions from Egypt
