= People and dogs =

1964 short story by Moawad GadElrab

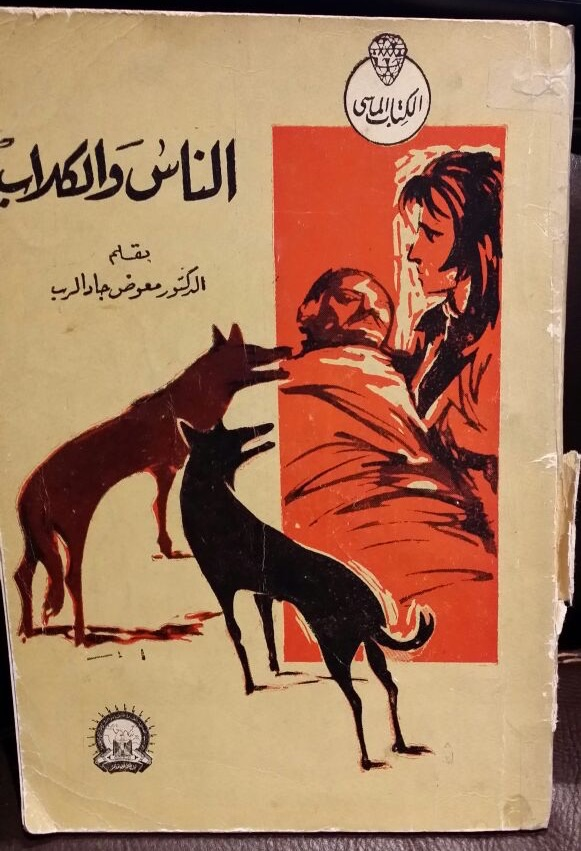
- Author: Moawad GadElrab
- Original title: El nas we El Kelab
- Genre: Short stories, literature, Egyptian literature, Arabic literature
- Publisher: The National Publishing and Printing house in Cairo, Egypt
- Publication date: 1964
- Media type: Print (paperback)
- Pages: 124

People and dogs (El nas we El Kelab, Arabic: الناس والكلاب) is a collection of short stories written by the Egyptian physician Moawad GadElrab (15 September 1929 – 23 August 1983) and published by The National Publishing and Printing house in Cairo, Egypt 1964.

== Stories ==
- The Demon
- Another woman
- Because my brother
- Do not speed up the pace
- Witness on the Nile
- The rest of life
- It's also For me
- In hand of God
- Flesh of a friend
- Sakka's daughter
- The cup
- I'll be back tomorrow
- People and dogs
- Images from the past

== See also ==
- List of Egyptian writers
- Moawad GadElrab
