= Menorahs and Minarets =

Menorahs and Minarets: A Novel
- English edition
- Author: Kamal Ruhayyim
- Translator: Sarah Enany
- Language: English
- Genre: Historical Fiction
- Publisher: Hoopoe
- Publication date: 2017
- Pages: 264
- ISBN: 978-9774168314

Menorahs and Minarets: A Novel is a 2017 book by Egyptian author Kamal Ruhayyim.

It constitutes the third part of the "Galal trilogy", dealing with the life of Galal, an Egyptian man with a Muslim father and a Jewish mother. After residing a decade in Paris, he returns to Cairo in the 1970s, where he faces the fact that he no longer belongs to his old Egyptian home.

This book was translated into English by Sarah Enany and published by AUC Press.
