= Abdel Rahim Ahmed =

Egyptian film director

Abdel-Rahim Ahmed
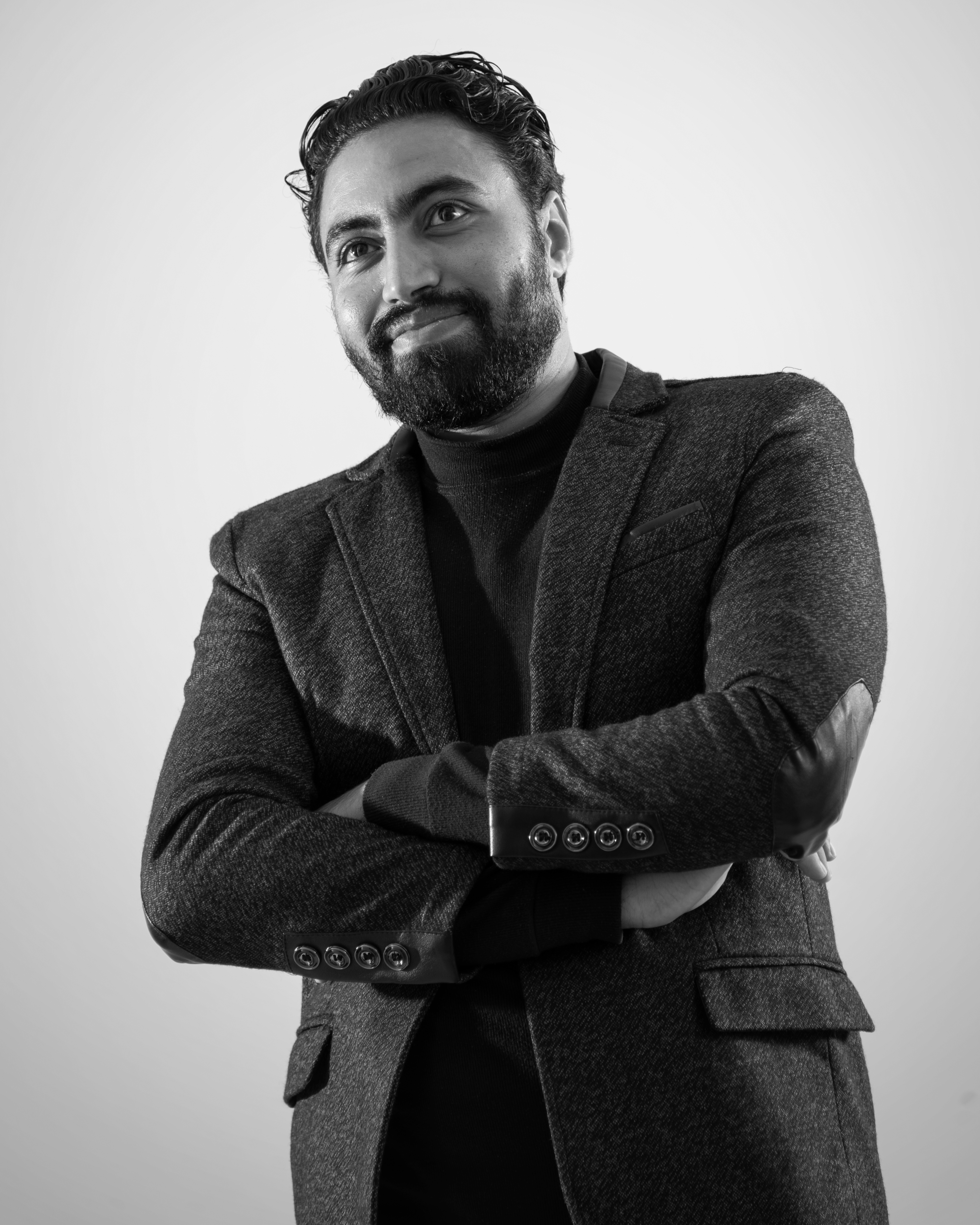
- Born: Alexandria, Egypt
- Education: New York Film Academy
- Occupations: screenwriter and director

Abdel Rahim Ahmed (Arabic: عبدالرحـيم أحمد) is an Egyptian director and author, born in Egypt, graduated from the 6 October University, Faculty of Applied Arts, Department of Photography, Film and Television, and then studied film directing at the Arab School of Film and Television in Egypt under Dr Mona Al-Sabban.

== Published works ==
=== Short films ===
See: A silent animated short film, that Abdel Rahim worked as an author, director, art director and animation artist. The film was produced by Abdel Rahim Ahmed in 2020.

A new dream movie: a short fictional film that Abdul Rahim worked as an author, director, and the film for the Arab Film School graduation project.

=== Series ===
- The series "Heroes of the Cartoon": The work includes a group of Saudi and Egyptian artists, He is worked as an author, screenwriter, director and production director. The series is produced by Saudi Arabia.
- "Future Child" series: An Egyptian series that discusses several topics in the childhood period from the angle of the child, the hero of work. He is worked as the author and writer of the script and the series produced by "NTC" Film Production company.
- The series "Fathers Under Construction": The series "Fathers Under Construction" consists of 10 episodes and tells the story of a young man who suffers from his father's treatment of him despite his wealth. He worked as a screenwriter, and the series was directed by the Lebanese Wissam Tanios.

== Authors ==
Luxor in the eyes of the Egyptian press.

Egyptian folk tale.

== See also ==
- List of Egyptian writers
- List of Egyptian authors
