= Egyptian-Lebanese Publishing House =

- Founded: 1985 (41 years ago)
- Country of origin: Egypt and Lebanon
- Headquarters location: Cairo and Beirut
- Publication types: Books
- Official website: https://www.almasriah.com

The Egyptian-Lebanese House (Arabic: الدار المصرية اللبنانية) is an Egyptian publishing house that was established in 1985 AD.

== History ==
The Egyptian-Lebanese House was established in 1985 AD. The house has published many literary publications, books and Arabic novels, and has also participated in many local and international book fairs. The publications of the house vary and cover different topics, on top of which is history. The house has published various works in different fields, including: Critical studies, Religious books, Poetry, trips ethics, Anecdotal collections, Novels (historical - social - detective - philosophical - psychological horror), Children's books, Articles and Thoughts and Marketing.

In 2009, The Egyptian-Lebanese House was honored Publishing and Technology branch of Sheikh Zayed Book Award.

== Authors ==
The Egyptian-Lebanese House has published the works of many well-known contemporary authors:

- Isaad_Younis
- Kahlil Gibran
- Ihsan Abdel Quddous
- Ashraf El-Ashmawi
- Walaa Kamal
- Radwa El Aswad
