= Rasha Adly =

Egyptian writer and art historian

- رشا عدلي
- Born: 1976 (age 49–50); Cairo, Egypt
- Education: Ain Shams University, Lyme Academy of Fine Arts
- Occupations: Writer, Art Historian
- Writing career
- Language: Arabic
- Genres: Fiction, Art History
- Notable works: Passion (2017); Girl with Braided Hair (2020); The Last Days of the Pasha (2019)
- Notable awards: Nominated for the International Prize for Arabic Fiction

Rasha Adly (Arabic: رشا عدلي; born 1976) is an Egyptian writer and art historian. She is the author of seven novels, two of which have been nominated for the International Prize for Arabic Fiction.

== Early life and education ==
Adly was born in Cairo in 1972. She holds a bachelor of arts degree in history from Ain Shams University and a master's degree in art history from the Lyme Academy of Fine Arts.

== Career ==
She is an independent lecturer in art history and Cairo correspondent for the Emirates Culture magazine. In addition, she has published numerous novels and academic studies. She primarily publishes in Arabic.

== Works ==
Novelistic or fictional works

- The Clamour of Silence (2010)
- Life is Not Always Rosy (2013)
- The Tattoo (2014)
- Confused Women (2014)
- The Shores of Departure (2016)
- Passion (2017)
- Girl with Braided Hair (2020)
- The Last Days of the Pasha (2019)
- The Night Train to Tel Aviv (2021)
- You are shining .. you lighting up (2022)

Academic works

- Cairo, the City and Memory (2012)
- Women in the History of Art (forthcoming)

=== Awards and recognition ===
Passion was nominated for the International Prize for Arabic Fiction (IPAF) in 2018. Her 2019 novel, The Last Days of the Pasha, was also nominated for the IPAF in 2020.

The Girl with Braided Hair was translated from the original Arabic into English by Sarah Enany, with the English version published in 2022.

== See also ==
- Ibrahim Abdel Meguid
- Radwa El Aswad
- Ahmed Mourad
