= Ibrahim Abdel Meguid =

Egyptian novelist and author (born 1946)

Ibrahim Abdel Meguid (Arabic: إبراهيم عبد المجيد, romanized: Ibrāhīm ʻAbd al-Majīd; born 2 December 1946) is an Egyptian novelist and author. His best-known works form the "Alexandria Trilogy": No One Sleeps in Alexandria, Birds of Amber, and Clouds Over Alexandria. These have been translated into English and French. Some of his works have also been adapted for films and movies.

== Early life and education ==
Ibrahim Abdel Meguid was born in Alexandria. He studied philosophy at Alexandria University. He obtained his BA in 1973 and moved to Cairo in 1975.

== Literary Themes ==
Literary critics have drawn thematic comparisons between Abdel Meguid's work The Other Place and T.S. Eliot's 1922 poem The Waste Land.

His book, Birds of Amber (2005) evokes Alexandria's cosmopolitanism with a sense of nostalgia combined with a desire for freedom from western colonial influence and for a kind of Arab cultural inclusiveness that could accommodate a mixture of foreign cultures.

In No One Sleeps in Alexandria (1996), he details the struggles of the inhabitants during World War II and reimagines Egypt through the “trauma of modernization”.

== Works ==
- المسافات [Al-Masafât] (1983). Distant Train, translated by Hosam M. Aboul-Ela (2007)
- بيت الياسمين [Bayt al-yasâmin] (1987). The House of Jasmine, trans. Noha Radwan (2012)
- البلدة الأخرى [Al Balda al-ukhrâ] (1991). The Other Place, trans. Farouk Abdel Wahab (1997)
- لا أحد ينام في الإسكندرية [La Ahad yanam fil Iskandariya] (1996). No One Sleeps in Alexandria, trans. Farouk Abdel Wahab (2004)
- طيور العنبر [Toyour al-anbar] (2000). Birds of Amber, trans. Farouk Abdel Wahab (2005)
- عتبة المتعة [Eatabat almutea] (2007). The Threshold of Pleasure
- في كل أسبوع يوم جمعة [Fi koulli ousbou yawmou joumoua] (2009). Every Week Has a Friday
- أيام التحرير ['Ayaam altahrir] (2011). Days of Tahrir
- الإسكندرية في غيمة [Iskandriya fi ghayma] (2012). Clouds Over Alexandria, trans. Kay Heikkinen (2019)
- القاهرة هنا [alqahirat huna] (2014). Cairo is Here

== Awards and honors ==
- 1996 Naguib Mahfouz Medal, inaugural winner for The Other Place
- 1996 Cairo International Book Fair, novel of the year, for No One Sleeps in Alexandria
- 2004 Egyptian State Prize for Excellence in Literature from the Supreme Council of Culture
- 2011 Sawiris Cultural Award, for Every Week Has a Friday
- 2015 Katara Prize for Arabic Novel, inaugural co-winner for Adagio
- 2016 The Sheikh Zayed Book Award for Beyond Writing

== See also ==
- Rasha Adly
- Radwa El Aswad
- Ahmed Mourad
