= Fathy Ghanem =

- Born: 24 March 1924; Cairo, Egypt
- Died: 24 February 1999 (aged 74)
- Occupation: Writer

Fathi Ghanem (Arabic: فتحي غانم) (2 March 1924 – 24 February 1999) was an Egyptian writer. Ghanem was born in Cairo to a working-class family. He graduated from the Faculty of Law, Fuad I University, in 1944, then worked as a reporter for Ruz al-Youssef, a newspaper published by the foundation of the same name. Later, he worked as an editor for Al Gomhuria and chairman of the board of directors at the Dar Al Tahrir Foundation, the newspaper's publisher.

== Works ==
=== Books ===
- The Man who Lost His Shadow (الرجل الذي فقد ظله, translated by Desmond Stewart)
- The Elephants (الأفيال)
- The Mountain (الجبل)

=== Films ===
- The Man who Lost His Shadow (الرجل الذي فقد ظله)
- Minister in Plaster (وزير في الحبس)

== See also ==
- List of Egyptian authors
- List of Egyptian writers
