= Samannud =

City in Gharbia Governorate, Egypt

Samannud سمنود Sebennytos
- City
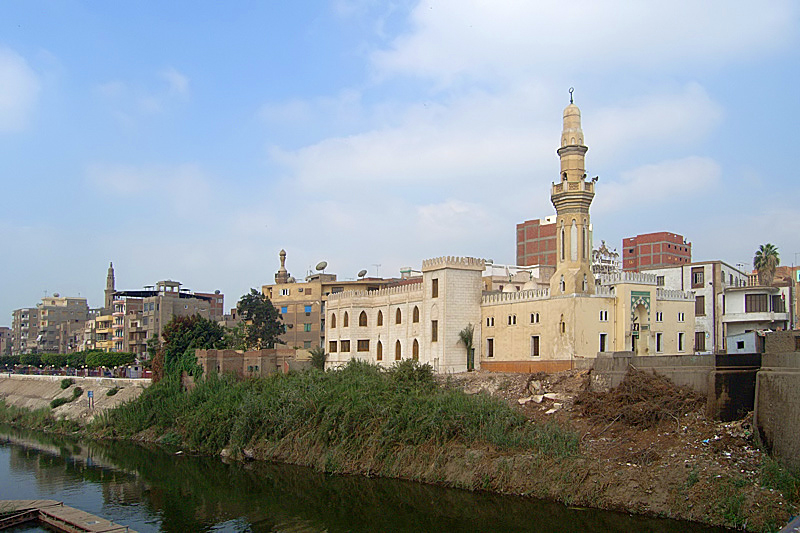
- Nile bank in Samannud

- Location in Egypt Samannud (Egypt)
- Coordinates: 30°58′00.0″N 31°15′00.0″E
- Country: Egypt
- Governorate: Gharbia

Area
  - Total: 57 sq mi (147 km^{2})

Population (2019 (estimated))
  - Total: 410,388
- Time zone: UTC+2 (EET)
  - Summer (DST): UTC+3 (EEST)

nTr T b niwt or nTr E9 t niwt
ṯb-nṯr
in hieroglyphs
Era: Late Period
(664–332 BC)

Samannud (Arabic: سمنود Samannūd) is a city (markaz) located in Gharbia Governorate, Egypt. Known in classical antiquity as Sebennytos (Ancient Greek: Σεβέννυτος), Samannud is a historic city that has been inhabited since the Ancient Egyptian period. As of 2019, the population of the markaz of Samannud was estimated to be 410,388, with 83,417 people living in urban areas and 326,971 in rural areas.

== Etymology ==
The place known in Egyptian Arabic: سمنود [sæmænˈnuːd], was historically called Sebennytos or Sebennytus.

- Coptic: ϫⲉⲙⲛⲟⲩϯ, and ϫⲉⲃⲉⲛⲟⲩⲧⲉ, Coptic pronunciation: [ʃæmˈnudi, ʃæβæˈnudæ]
- Late Coptic: ⲥⲉⲃⲉⲛⲛⲏⲧⲟⲩ and ⲥⲉⲃⲉⲛⲛⲉⲧⲟⲩ, [sæβænˈnidu, sæβænˈnædu]
- Ancient Greek: Σεβέννυτος and Σεβέννυς or ἡ Σεβεννυτικὴ πόλις
- Egyptian: ṯb-(n)-nṯr)

The name Samannud ultimately derives from the Ancient Egyptian name ṯb-(n)-nṯr, meaning "city of the sacred calf". The name was probably pronounced */ˌcabˈnaːcar/ in Old Egyptian and */ˌcəbˈnuːtə/ or */ˌcəbənˈnuːtə/ in Late Egyptian.

== Ancient history ==
Samannud (Sebennytos) was an ancient city of Lower Egypt, located on the now-silted up Sebennytic branch of the Nile in the Delta. Sebennytos was the capital of Lower Egypt's twelfth nome—the Sebennyte nome (district). Sebennytos was also the seat of the Thirtieth Dynasty of Egypt (380–343 BCE).

Sebennytos is perhaps best known as the hometown of Manetho, a historian and chronicler from the Ptolemaic era, c. 3rd century BC. Sebennytos was also the hometown of Nectanebo II; he was its last ruler.

A temple dedicated to the local god Anhur, or Anhur-Shu, and his lioness goddess mate Mehit, once existed at this location but is now reduced to ruins. A fragment from the location where kings would have made offerings to Anhur and his wife, is on display at the Walters Art Museum.

== Modern history ==
During the Battle of Sebennytos, Samannud resisted the Muslim conquest of Egypt in 641, and remained rebellious for some time thereafter; the city revolted four times in the first half of the eighth century. Three Coptic Patriarchs came from Samannud: John III, Cosmas II, and John V. The 12th-century Coptic philologist Yuhanna al-Samannudi also came from Samannud, and served as its bishop.

Historical population
| Year | Pop. | ±% |
|---|---|---|
| 1996 | 249,672 | — |
| 2006 | 298,166 | +19.4% |
| 2019 | 410,388 | +37.6% |
Source: Citypopulation.de

Samannud's bishopric remained active through the late thirteenth century, indicating the presence of a large Christian population at the time.

In 1843, John Gardner Wilkinson described it as a place of some size, with the usual bazaars of the large towns of Egypt, and famous for its pottery, which was sent to Cairo.

The 1885 Census of Egypt recorded Samannud as a city in its own district in Gharbia Governorate; at that time, the population of the city was 11,550 (5,686 men and 5,864 women).

== Notable people ==
- Pope John III of Alexandria (7th century)
- Pope Cosmas II of Alexandria (9th century)
- Pope Shenouda I of Alexandria (9th century)
- Ahmed Abu Ismail (1915–2013), Minister of Finance
- Mohamed Nagui (1947–2014), writer
- Ahmed Mansour (born 1962), journalist

== In religious traditions ==
In a Coptic tradition, Sebennytos was part of the route of the Holy Family during the flight into Egypt narrated in the Gospel of Matthew (2:13–23).

== Gallery ==
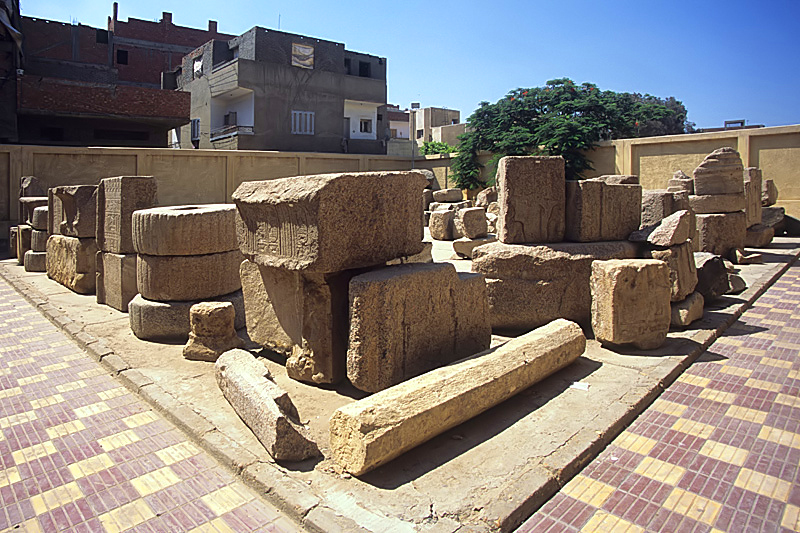
Archeological findings from Sebennytos

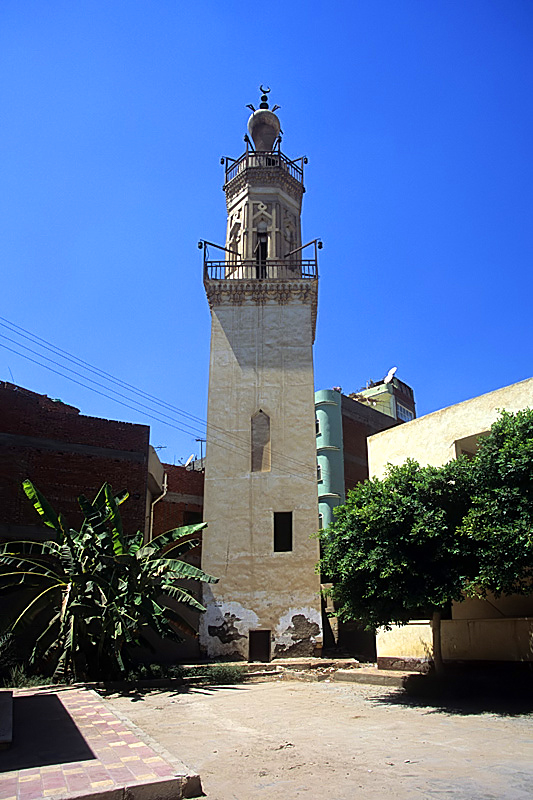
Sidi Salama minaret

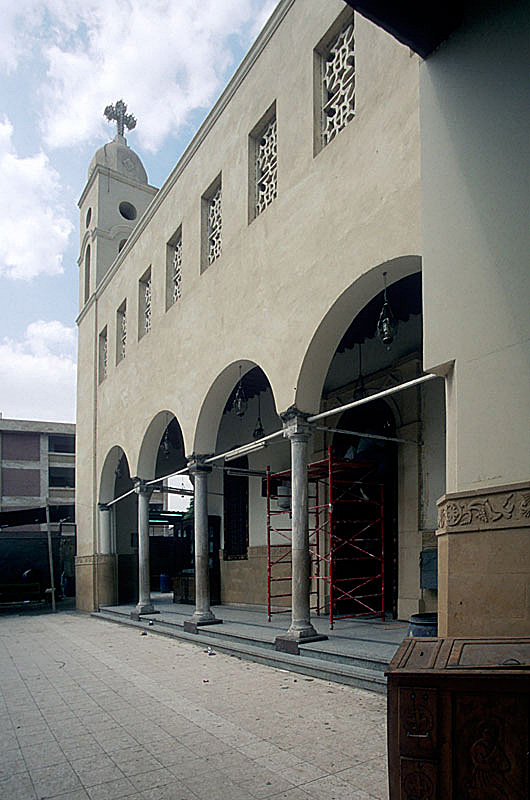
Church of the Holy Virgin and Apanoub

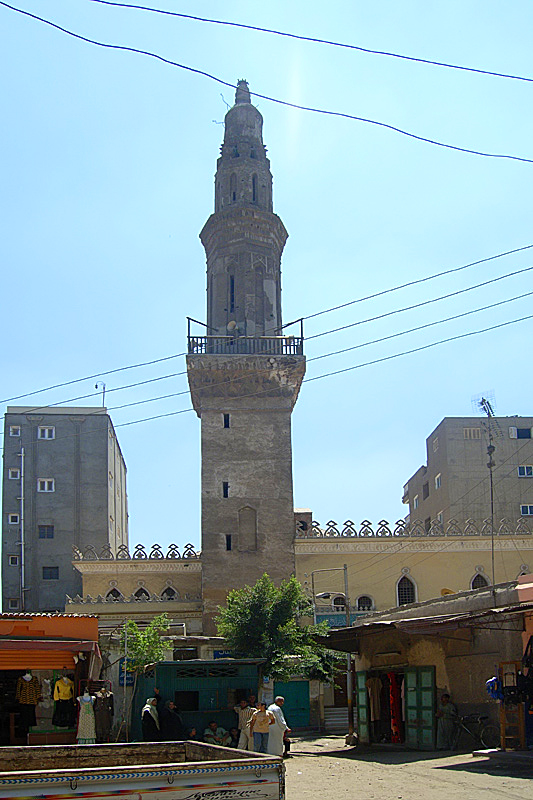
Mitwally minaret

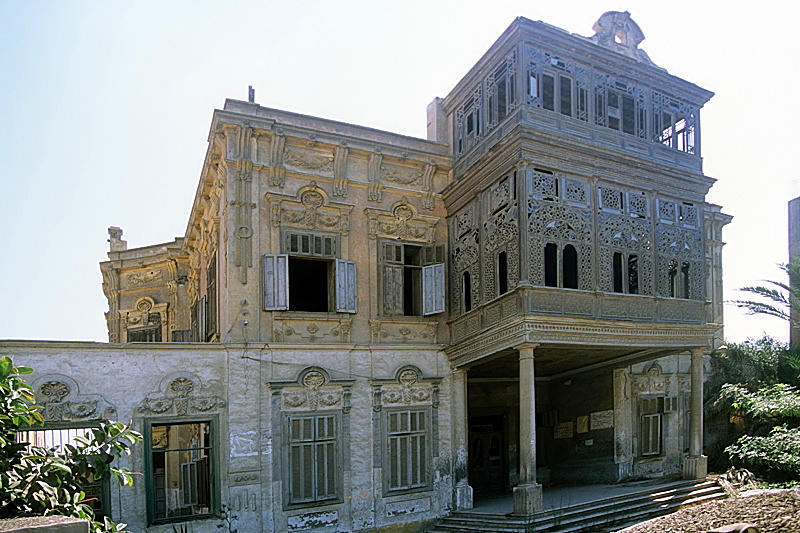
Ghoneim Palace

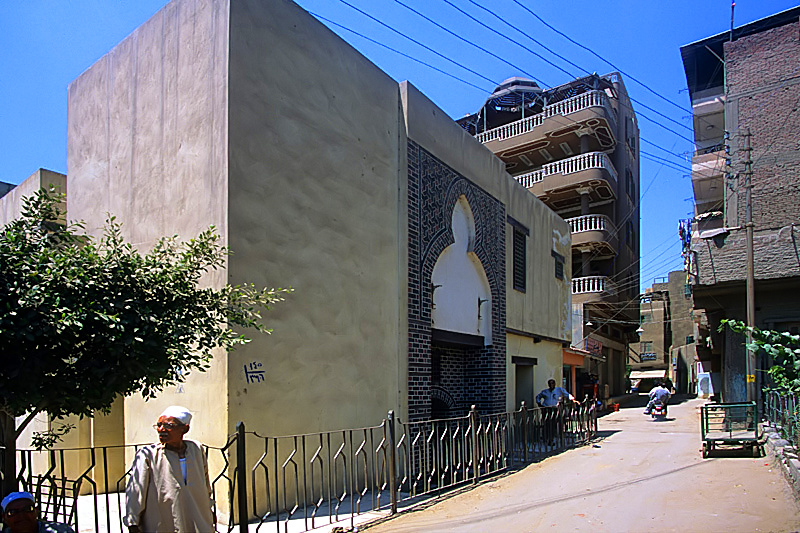
Ibrahim Sirag el-Din Hammam

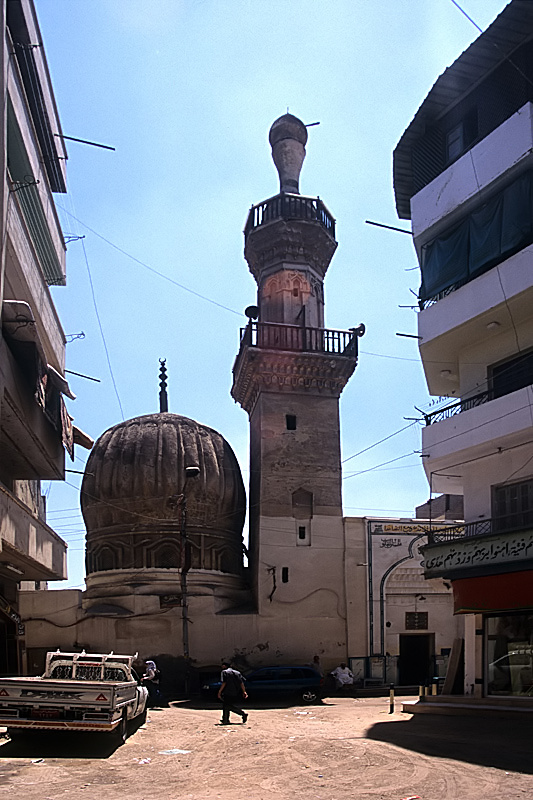
Qubba Darihiya

== See also ==
- List of cities and towns in Egypt

| Preceded by Mendes | Historical capital of Egypt; 380 – 332 BC | Succeeded by Alexandria |
