= Kamal Ruhayyim =

Egyptian writer (1947–2023)

Kamal Ruhayyim (1947 – 29 September 2023) was an Egyptian writer. He obtained a doctorate in law from Cairo University, before pursuing a career in law enforcement (police and Interpol). As an author, he is best known for the Galal trilogy, which consist of Diary of a Jewish Muslim, Days in the Diaspora and Menorahs and Minarets. All three books have been translated by Sarah Enany and published by AUC Press. Ruhayyim died on 29 September 2023, at the age of 76.
