= Diary of a Jewish Muslim =

2014 novel by Kamal Ruhayyim

Diary of a Jewish Muslim: An Egyptian Novel
- English edition
- Author: Kamal Ruhayyim
- Translator: Sarah Enany
- Language: English
- Genre: Historical Fiction
- Publisher: The American University in Cairo Press
- Publication date: 2014
- Pages: 248
- ISBN: 978-9774166433

Diary of a Jewish Muslim (Arabic: يوميات مسلم يهودي, romanized: Yawmīyāt Muslim Yahūdī) is a 2014 book by Egyptian author Kamal Ruhayyim.

It constitutes the first part of the "Galal trilogy", dealing with the life of Galal, an Egyptian boy with a Muslim father and a Jewish mother and spanning the 1930s to the 1960s.

This book was translated into English by Sarah Enany and published by AUC Press, a translation that was nominated for the Banipal Prize.
