= Doha Assy =

Egyptian writer and novelist

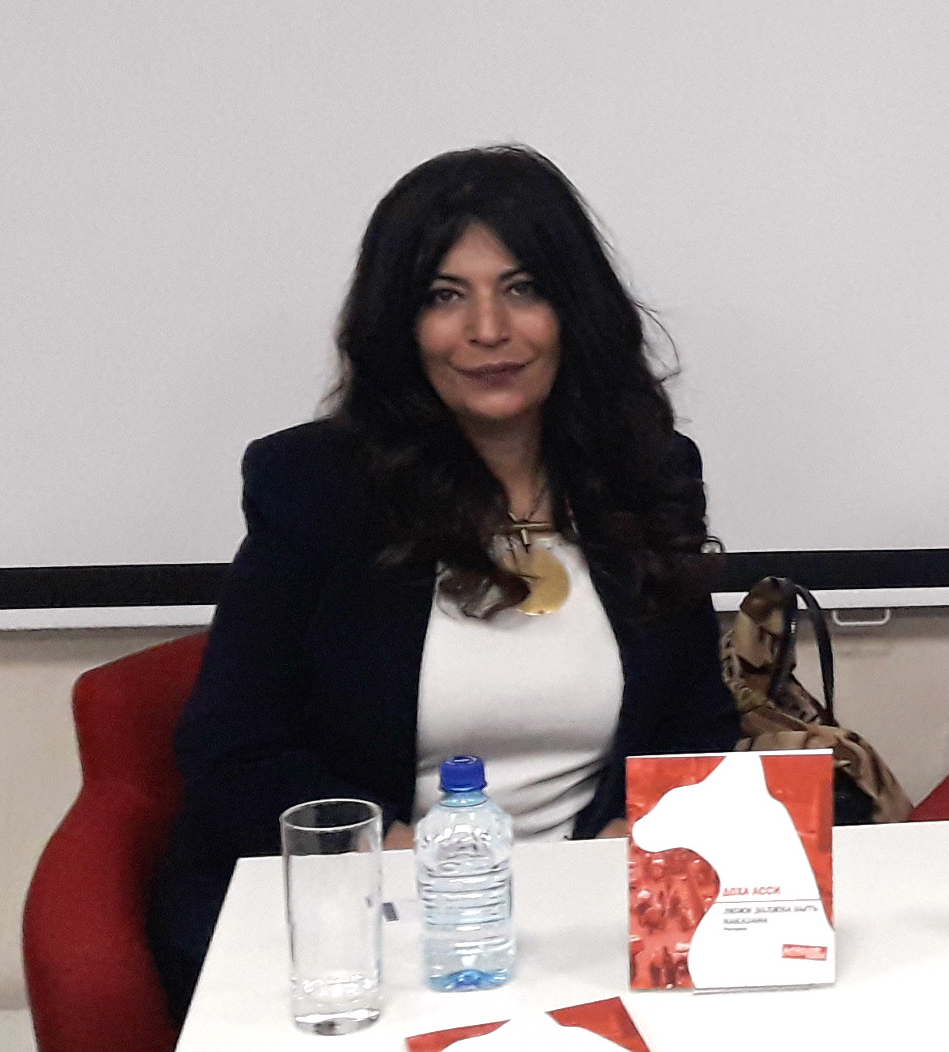
- Doha Assy at Library for Foreign Literature
- Born: June 22, 1970 (age 55); Mansoura City
- Education: Diploma in the Russian language Bachelor’s degree in Tourism and Hotels Diploma in art criticism Diploma in folk arts Diploma in Arab Christian heritage

Doha Mustafa Assy (Arabic: ضحى مصطفى عاصي) is an Egyptian writer and novelist who has published a number of studies and books, perhaps the most prominent of which is the book “Mubarak's Trial with the Testimony of Mrs. Nafisa”, which was considered as a study of the Egyptian people and their requests in 2012 and before. Her novel “104 Cairo” was published as well. In addition to books, novels, other studies and dozens of research articles, she is a specialist in Egyptian history and a researcher in heritage. Her origins belong to the city of Mansoura. She published many story collections and novels, which were translated to many foreign languages. In 2020, she entered the House of Representatives election, within the National Bloc Alliance for Egypt, which consists of 12 parties, with the slogan “Culture for all”.

== Childhood and Education ==
Doha Assy was born on June 22, 1970, in the city of Mansoura. She studied in Franciscan high schools in Mansoura, then traveled to the Soviet Union to complete her university studies. Her father was a passionate supporter of education and insisted on providing adequate support for the education of his children.

Her father, Sheikh Mustafa Assy, was one of the symbols of the Egyptian Leftist Movement, and he was one of the founders of the "National Progressive Unionist Party", which was established in the wake of the return of political parties, and the ending of the "Arab Socialist Union". It was the only political party in Egypt in 1976, which was named by the late president Anwar El-Sadat at that time “Al-Manabar". The party was founded by a group of Left-Leaning Tendencies in general, including socialists, communists, nasserists, nationalists and some liberals, but the communists were also at the heart of the group calling for the establishment of the party.

The late Sheikh was one of the most prominent opponents of the late president, and at that time he was called "The Red Sheikh", and it was strange for one of the sheikhs of Al-Azhar to embrace leftist ideas, so Sadat - amid his criticism of the leftist movement - said about him, "Even their sheikh is named Assy.”. The father faced a lot of persecution and abuse, which ended when he was arrested among a large number of Egyptian politicians and activists in what was known as the "September 1981 arrests", when the late president threw almost all of his opponents into prison, who were released following his assassination during the military parade on the occasion of the anniversary The victories of October 1973, through a goodwill gesture presented by the new president - at the time, Hosni Mubarak.

These events affected the girl, who was eleven years old at the time of her father's arrest and had an impact on her writing and on her literary and novel project later, from which she derived self-respect and the need to express opinion freely. She recognized the importance of education and culture and their impact on the individual and society; Her father also encouraged her to study languages, so she became fluent in English, Russian, French and a little Italian.

== Certificates ==
Doha Assy obtained a diploma in the Russian language from the Pushkin Institute at Moscow University with a grade of distinction, and studied at the First Medical Institute in Moscow “Sychnava”, and then returned to Egypt to also obtain a bachelor's degree in Tourism and Hotels, Department of Tourist Guidance, English-French from Helwan University. After that, she completed her postgraduate studies, obtaining a diploma in art criticism from the Higher Institute of Art Criticism at the Academy of Arts, a diploma in folk arts from the Higher Institute of Folk Arts at the Academy of Arts, and finally a diploma in Arab Christian heritage from the College of Evangelical Theology.

== Career ==
Doha Assy has published dozens of books and novels, perhaps the most notably of which is the novel “104 Cairo” by Jasmine House for Publishing and Distribution / ‘Dar alyasmin linisher and Tawzee’/. This novel was considered by critics to be a brilliant work of creativity characterized by the liveliness of the narrative. In this novel, the writer presented a highly intertwined and intense social painting that explores and motivates Egyptian social life from the fifties of the last century until the first decade of this century. The cultures of saints and mystics are fused with the world of wisdom, Greek philosophy, singing, folk magic recipes, and more. She also published the novel “French Clouds” by Ibn Rushd/Dar Ibn Rushd/, which is the novel that tells the story of Buffalo Stallions that Jacob brought out of his and other oil and serge mills, and they raged, then he confined them between two forces of the military, when their bodies were pelted with spears, crowded and scrambled at the gate. The stones laid by the revolutionaries who attacked the Tribe Street and the Christian market moved from a point that was neglected, and they entered the path of the Garden. The revolutionaries closed the gate by rocks. The French military opened the gate using the Buffalo and arrested the revolutionaries.

Assy published the novel “The Happiness of the Supermarket” by Merit Publishing and Knowledge House/Dar Merit lilmaloumat /. In this novel, it dealt with the romantic story of a young hero Ayman, who approached his lover and began to dance with her, singing the song I Will Survive with the intention of getting to know the beloved and start a relationship with her. Back in 2012, about one year after the outbreak of the January 25 revolution in Egypt, Doha Assy published a book of her entitled “Mubarak's Trial with the Testimony of Mrs. Nafisa” on the Egyptian Renaissance House for Printing and Publishing/Dar Alnahda for Publishing and distribution/ in about 112 pages. The aim of the book - as Doha mentioned in one of her press interviews - was a socio-anthropological study project that aims to write the changes that have occurred in the Egyptian society through a reading of the messages that people put in the tombs of the saints, whether they are changes in awareness, needs or the nature of problems. According to critics, the book succeeded to some extent in clarifying the changes that have occurred in the Egyptians during fifty years. Rather, the writer realized that these letters carry with them evidence of condemnation of the regime of former President Hosni Mubarak, as most of the requests were indicating inability. The state must fulfill its basic obligations towards the Egyptian citizen.

She was a founder and co-founder of many cultural centers, including Abjadia Cultural Center in Downtown Cairo 2011–2014, and Shababeek Cultural Center in Mokattam, Cairo 2012–2014.

== Point of View ==
Doha does not like to answer the question: “the best book she has read”. she says that she treats every book with great passion. Thus, she admired a biography of a Palestinian priest named Laron Kabodge, who lived in the seventies, He was taking advantage of his work as Metropolitan of Jerusalem to transport weapons to the Palestinian resistance through his car, until he was finally exposed. Regarding the topics that she writes on or about, Doha says that all the topics represent a great challenge to the writer, including the “taboos” and the hadith here is a trilogy of “religion, gender and politics.” However, Assy tries - according to her - to practice writing all literary forms.

Assy is attracted to Russian literature with all his books, especially Fyodor Dostoevsky and Antoine Chekhov, whom she has read since her childhood, which is reflected in her writings, as she confirmed to the Egyptian Al-Bawaba News website. From the Arab writers, she like to read of the school of Youssef Idris, and Yahya Al-Taher Abdullah.

== Works ==
This is a list of the most prominent works of the writer:

- “French Clouds” (original title: Ghuyoum Faransiyah).
- “Supermarket Happiness” (original title: Saadat Alsuper market).
- “104 Cairo” (original title: 104 Alqahirah).
- “Mubarak's Trial” (original title: Muhakamat Mubarak).
- “A Cup of Coffee” (original title: Finjan Qahwah).
