= Moawad GadElrab =

Egyptian author (1929–1983)

Moawad GadElrab معوض جاد الرب
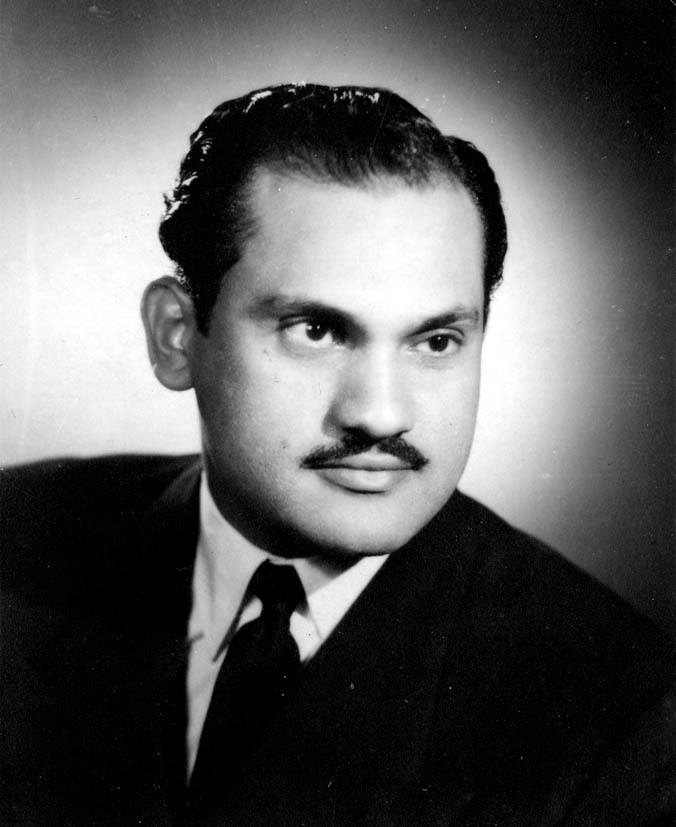
- Moawad GadElrab
- Born: September 15, 1929; Asyut, Egypt
- Died: August 23, 1983 (aged 53); Cairo, Egypt
- Citizenship: Egyptian
- Education: medical college Cairo University
- Occupations: professor of artistic anatomy in the faculty of art education
- Children: 2
- Writing career
- Language: Arabic
- Period: Late 1950s – 1960s
- Genre: short stories
- Notable works: People and dogs; Jude Where is your master and other stories

Moawad GadElrab (Arabic: معوض جاد الرب; 15 September 1929 – 23 August 1983) was an Egyptian occasional actor and writer, also a professor of artistic anatomy in the Faculty of Art Education, Zamalek (Helwan University) in the 1950s and 1960s of the last century.

He also participated in several art exhibition, his paintings were acquired by many official bodies, some of his paintings were showcased in Kasr El Aini Hospital medical college.

== Books ==
Many of his works were adapted for a television play, his articles appeared regularly in the press alongside a weekly column in Watani newspaper.

- People and dogs (Arabic: الناس والكلاب) was released by the national publishing and printing house in Cairo in 1964, contains many short stories, including The Demon, Another Women, because my brother, Do not speed up the pace, a witness on the Nile, the rest of life, it's also For me, in the hand of God, the flesh of a friend, Sakka's daughter, the cup, I'll be back tomorrow, people and dogs, pictures from the past.
- "Jude Where is Your Master" (Arabic: يهوذا أين سيدك, romanized: Yahūdhā ayna sayyiduk) and other stories

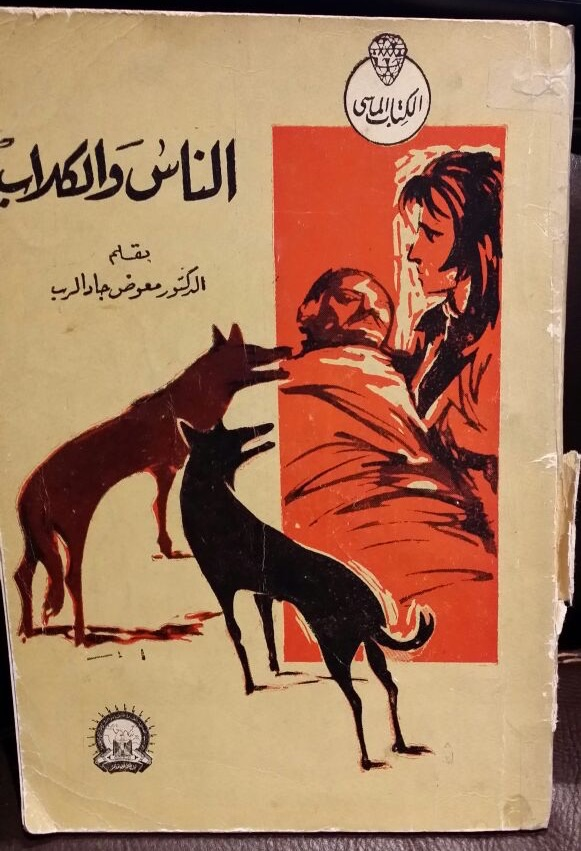
People and dogs

== See also ==
- List of Egyptian writers
