= List of Egyptian films of 1968 =

A list of films produced in Egypt in 1968. For an A-Z list of films currently on Wikipedia, see Category:Egyptian films.

== 1968 ==
Title	Director	Cast	Genre	Notes
1968
Thalath Nesaa (Three Women)	Samir Chamas	Salah Zulfikar, Mervat Amin, Sabah, Huda Sultan	Drama	
Al Nil wal Hayah (The Nile and the Life)	Youssef Chahine	Salah Zulfikar, Emad Hamdy, Madiha Salem	Drama	
El Ragol Elazy Faqad Zilloh (The Man who Lost his Shadow)	Kamal El Sheikh	Salah Zulfikar, Magda, Kamal El-Shennawi	Drama	
Afreet Mirati (My Wife’s Goblin)	Fatin Abdel Wahab	Salah Zulfikar, Shadia	Romantic comedy	
