= Farouk Abdel Wahab Mustafa =

Egyptian academic and translator

- فاروق عبد الوهاب مصطفى
- Born: December 10, 1943; Cairo, Kingdom of Egypt
- Died: April 3, 2013 (aged 69); Chicago, Illinois, United States
- Awards: Saif Ghobash Banipal Prize for Arabic Literary Translation (2007)

Academic background
- Education: Cairo University (B.A. 1962, M.A. 1969); University of Minnesota (Ph.D. 1977)

Academic work
- Discipline: Arabic literature, translation studies
- Notable works: English translations of Naguib Mahfouz, Gamal al-Ghitani, Khairy Shalaby, and Alaa Al Aswany

Farouk Abdel Wahab Mustafa (Arabic: عبد الوهاب، فاروق; c. 1943 – 3 April 2013), pen name Farouk Abdel Wahab, was an Egyptian academic and translator based in the USA. He was born in Tanta and studied at the University of Cairo. He received a BA degree in 1962 and an MA in English literature in 1969.

== Early life and education ==
He pursued doctoral studies at the University of Minnesota, obtaining a PhD in comparative literature in 1977. He taught at the University of Chicago from 1975 until his death.

He was the first occupant of the university's Ibn Rushd Professorial Lectureship in Modern Arabic Language, and was also the associate director of its Center for Middle Eastern Studies.

== Translations ==
He was also a noted translator of contemporary Arabic literature. Among his translations are the following:

- A Certain Woman by Hala el Badry
- The Other Place by Ibrahim Abdel Meguid
- No One Sleeps in Alexandria by Ibrahim Abdel Meguid
- Birds of Amber by Ibrahim Abdel Meguid
- Chicago by Alaa el Aswany
- Love in Exile by Bahaa Tahir
- The Lodging House by Khairy Shalaby
- Zayni Barakat by Gamal al-Ghitani
- The Zafarani Files by Gamal al-Ghitani
- The Book of Epiphanies by Gamal al-Ghitani
- Al-A'mal al-Kamila (Complete Works) of Mikhail Roman

He also translated works by Shakespeare and Pirandello into Arabic.

== Awards and recognition ==
- Mustafa won the 2007 Banipal Prize for his translation of Khairy Shalaby's The Lodging House.

== Association ==
- Mustafa was a member of the Middle East Studies Association and the Arab Cultural Council of America.

== Tribute ==
Mustafa died on 3 April 2013.

== See also ==
- List of Arabic-English translators
