= The Man Who Lost His Shadow =

1968 film

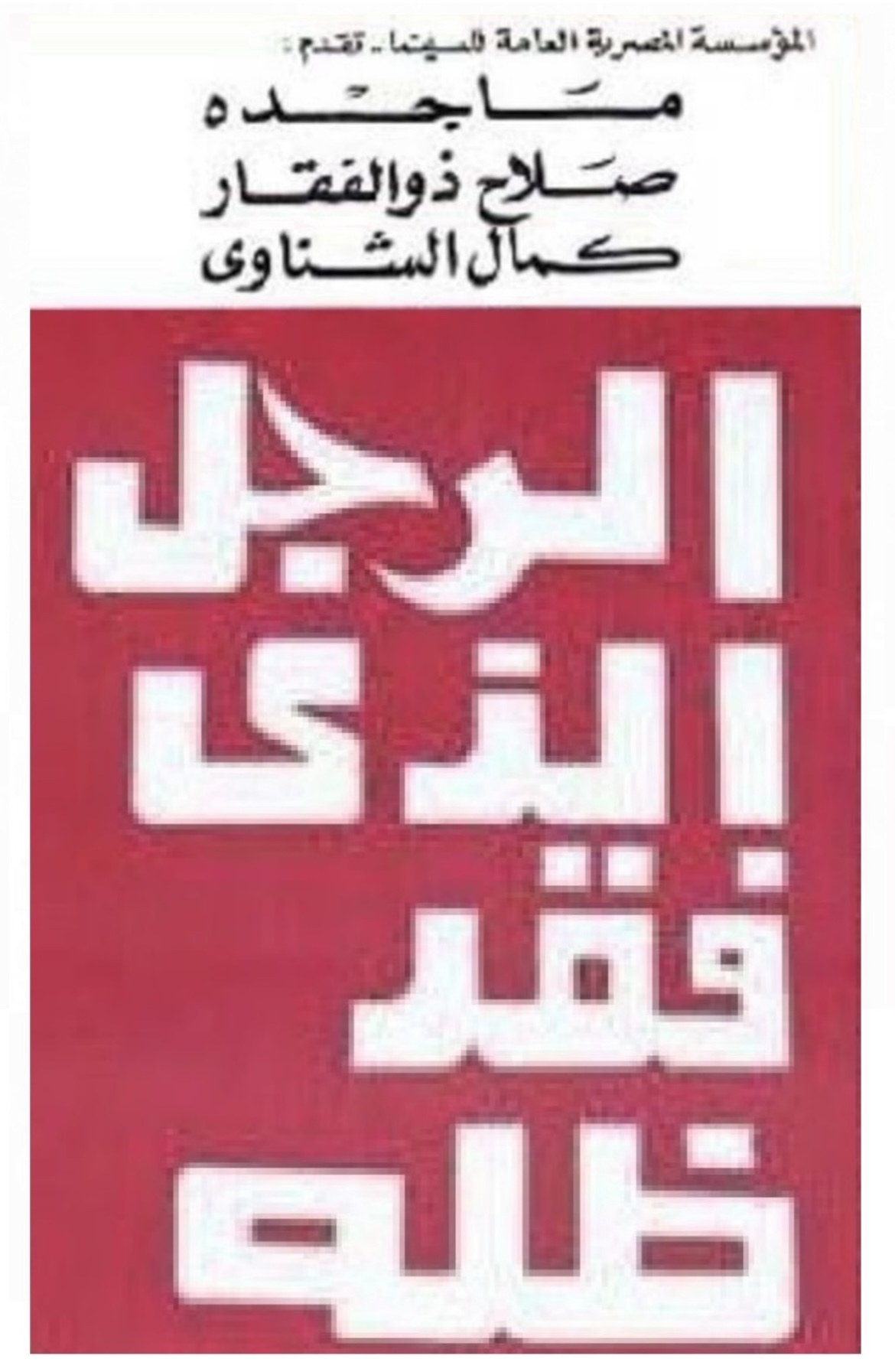
- Film poster
- Arabic: الرجل الذى فقد ظله
- Directed by: Kamal El Sheikh
- Written by: Fathy Ghanem
- Screenplay by: Ali El Zorqany
- Produced by: Mohamed Samy
- Starring: Magda; Salah Zulfikar; Kamal El-Shennawi
- Cinematography: Mahmoud Nasr
- Edited by: Said El-Sheikh
- Music by: Andre Ryder
- Production companies: General Egyptian Corporation for Cinema and Television
- Distributed by: General Egyptian Corporation for Cinema and Television
- Release date: October 29, 1968
- Country: Egypt
- Language: Egyptian Arabic

The Man who lost his Shadow (Arabic: الرجل الذى فقد ظله, translit: El Ragol Ellazi fakad Zelloh) is a 1968 Egyptian film directed by Kamal El Sheikh. It is based on Fathy Ghanem’s story under the same name. It stars Magda, Salah Zulfikar and Kamal El-Shennawi. The film is a member of the Top 100 Egyptian films list.

== Synopsis ==
The events of the film occur before the 1952 Revolution, Shawky is a revolutionary who struggles to build a new world. His friend, Youssef, rose in the world of journalism on the shoulders of his teacher, Mohamed Nagy, as he is an opportunist who sold himself in order to achieve his individual ambition and abandoned all human values and traditions with the aim of linking to a higher class represented by the aristocratic Souad. He struggles to build a new world in which his middle class and even the whole country will obtain social justice. Youssef's father assaults his maid, Mabrouka, and after his death, Youssef expels her with her son. However she knows the way to struggle so that there are no new victims like her. He reached it when social conditions changed after the 1952 Revolution. Then Mabrouka falls in love with Shawky.

== Primary cast ==
- Magda as Mabrouka
- Salah Zulfikar as Shawky
- Kamal El-Shennawi as Youssef
- Nelly as Baheya/Samia
- Emad Hamdy as Abdel Hamid
- Yusuf Shaaban as Anwar Samy
- Ali Gohar as Mohamed Nagy
- Mahmoud Yassin as Saad
- Soheir Fakhry as Soad
- Nazeem Shaarawy as Shohdy pasha

== See also ==
- Cinema of Egypt
- Salah Zulfikar filmography
- List of Egyptian films of 1968
- List of Egyptian films of the 1960s
