= List of Egyptian-American writers =

This is a list of Egyptian American writers.

- Nonie Darwish, author and writer
- Victor Hassine, prison writer
- Lucette Lagnado, author and journalist

== See also ==
- List of Egyptian writers
