= Al-Zini Barakat =

- Author: Gamal al-Ghitani
- Language: Arabic
- Genre: Literary fiction/Historical fiction/Political fiction
- Published: 1974
- Publisher: Dar Al-Shorouk Publishing
- Pages: 287

Al-Zini Barakat is an Egyptian novel written by Gamal al-Ghitani. The novel discusses the question of oppression persisting through time and place, in all Arab countries and it tries to merge past and present through the main character - Al-Zini Barakat. The novel was adapted into a TV series in 1995 directed by Yahya Al-Alami.

== Subject of the novel ==
Gamal al-Ghitani presents his novel - Al-Zini Barakat - as a record of Egypt's history through the two characters: Al-Zini Barakat and Zakariya Bin Radi. He presents these two characters as characters who were actually present during the Mamluk era in Egypt. He uses this novel to critique Egypt's modern history, especially during the 1960s.

Al-Ghitani saw parallels between the last bit of the 1960s, increased mass arrests and increased surveillance, and the period of Al-Zini Barakat, which was during the fall of the Mamluk era, and the rise of the Ottoman Empire in Egypt during 1517. The author also saw parallels between the Six-Day war (Naksa of 1967) and the Battle of Marj Dabiq of 1516, which resulted in a victory for the Ottomans. Especially since the period of the duo (Barakat and Zakariya) was filled with conflicts between leaders, leading them to lose against the Ottomans.

== Literary criticism ==
The Egyptian thinker Ibrahim Awad critiques the representation of Islam in this novel. He says that the mistakes are vile, and that even schoolboys have better knowledge of Islam.

== Gamal al-Ghitani on his novel ==
Al-Ghitani states that "Al-Zini Barakat" resulted from his awareness of the police repression during the 1960s. He added that the rule of Gamal Abdel Nasser was an attempt at social justice and achieving simple dreams. He also said that this attempt was killed off through democracy. He mentioned that this repression is not yet over, and that it is important to leave a testimony, especially since he belongs to the generation of the 1960s, so that these mistakes do not get repeated.
