= Abd al-Qadir Qitt =

Egyptian writer and critic

- Born: April 10, 1916
- Died: 2002
- Citizenship: Egypt
- Education: University of London
- Awards: King Faisal International Prize in Arabic Language and Literature (1980)

Abd al-Qadir Hassan Al-Qitt (عبد القادر القط; 1335 AH/April 10, 1916 – 2002; also transliterated Qat, Qutt or Kott) was an Egyptian poet, critic, and writer. He was born in Belqas, Dakahlia Governorate, and held a doctorate in Arabic literature and literary criticism. Al-Qat edited the “Poetry” magazine in 1964, and was appointed Dean of the Faculty of Arts at Ain Shams University in 1972. He received the King Faisal International Prize in Literature in 1980 and the State Appreciation Award in 1985, and was the editor-in-chief of the “Ibdaa” magazine for theatre and cinema in 1983.

== Biography ==
Abdel-Qader Hassan Al-Qat was born in 1916 in Dakahlia Governorate, east of Al-Masara in the Belqas Center. He graduated from the Faculty of Arts in 1938, after which he worked as an employee in the Cairo University Library until 1945. Abdel-Qader was sent to the University of London on a scholarship to obtain a doctorate which he received in 1950 at Ain Shams University in 1951. Dr Al-Qatt became the head of the Arabic Language Department between 1962 and 1973 and was elected Dean of the college in 1973–1974. He left Ain Shams University to work as Head of the Arabic Language Department in the Beirut Arab University between 1975 and 1982. There were four creative magazines between 1964 and 1992, the last of which was his presidency of the “Ibdaa” magazine. When he was its editor-in-chief, he contributed to presenting several young creative voices and provided the opportunity to publish new experiences, especially to poets in the seventies.

Dr Al-Qatt, before his departure, was a member of the Supreme Council of Culture and rapporteur of the Poetry Committee, and in 1980 he won the King Faisal International Prize in Literature for his book "The Emotional Attitude in Contemporary Arab Poetry." He won the State Appreciation Award in 1984 and eventually the Mubarak Prize in Literature, winning 21 votes from The committee's Voices (24 voices). He has a single poetry collection called "Memories of a Young Man." He has many critical books and technical and cultural works, including: "The Emotional Attitude in Arabic Poetry", "The Concept of Poetry in Arabs", and "On Islamic and Umayyad Poetry", as well as "The Word and the Image", "Issues and Positions", "In Contemporary Egyptian Literature", and other books and translations. He was a member of the Wafd Party at first, then left it to organize the Young Egypt Party for many years, which he also left despite his close relationship with Ahmed Hussein and Fathi Radwan. He then became the editor-in-chief of the magazine Al Majalla.

Among his teachers were Taha Hussein, Muhammad Mandour, Louis Awad, Amin Al-Khouli and Abdel-Wahhab Azzam. He was one of the most important founders of the famous literary symposium that was held at Abdullah Café in Giza in the fifties and was attended by Ahmed Abdel-Moati Hegazy, Raja’ Al-Naqash, Anwar El-Madawy, Mahmoud Al-Saadani, Zakaria Al-Hijjawi, Louis Awad and Muhammad Mandour, Ahmed Abbas Saleh and others.

Al-Qat was married to an Austrian and had two children, Amin and Nora.

== Death ==
Less than a week after receiving the Mubarak Prize in Literary Criticism, he died due to illness in 2002.

== Works ==
=== Writings ===
- "Thikrayat Alshabab" (Memories of Youth) (Poetry)
- "Mafhoom Alsher Inda Alarab" (The concept of poetry among Arabs) (PhD thesis translated from English)
- "Fi Aladab Almasri" (In contemporary Egyptian literature)
- "Fi Aadab Alarabi Alhadeeth" (In modern Arabic literature)
- "Kathaya Wa Mawakif" (issues and situations)
- "Fi Alsheir Alislami Wa Alumawi" (In Islamic and Umayyad poetry)
- "Alitijah Alwujdani Fi Alsheir Alarabi Almuaasir" (The sentimental trend in contemporary Arabic poetry)
- "Fan Almasrahiya" (theatrical art)
- "Fan Altarjama" (The art of translation)
- "Alkalima Wa Alsoora" (word and picture)

=== Research ===
- Renewal movements in Abbasid poetry. Research published in the memorial book on the occasion of Dr Taha Hussein reaching his seventieth year.
- Ancient Arabic criticism and methodology (research published in Fosoul magazine in 1983)
- The issue of the term in modern literary criticism curricula (research published in the Arab Journal of Human Sciences (Kuwait University) in 1994).
- Love and Women in the Poetry of Nizar Qabbani (research published in the book Nizar Qabbani, Poet for All Generations in 1998)
- An extended study of three books by Mustafa Sadiq Al-Rafi: The Roses. Letters of Sorrow - Red Clouds - in the Book of Longman Publishing House in Cairo
- An extended study on "the prose poem" was published in a book that includes the works of the literary symposium for the Hassan Faki Prize in 1996
- Dr Tharwat Okasha's translations of the five books of Gibran Khalil Gibran on the English language, lengthy research published in a book on Dr. Tharwat Okasha 1998

=== Translations from English ===
- Three plays by Shakespeare: Hamlet, Richard III, Pericles
- The St. Louis Ray Bridge (a novel by American writer Thornton Wilder)
- Summer and Smoke (a play by the American writer Tennessee Williams)
- The Tales of Ivan Belkin (a collection of short stories by the Russian poet Pushkin)
- Chekhov - His Life and Art (by the Russian writer Barmilov) in association with Professor Fuad Kamel
- The Prodigal Son (a play by Richard Sonn)
- The Most Beautiful Days of Your Life (a play by the American writer Lianne Saroyan)
- The Heirloom (a play by Henry James, directed at the National Theatre)
