= Out el Kouloub =

Out El Kouloub
- قوت القلوب الدمرداشية
- Born: 1899; Cairo
- Died: 1968 (aged 68–69)
- Writing career
- Notable work: Ramza

Out El Kouloub (1899–1968) also known as Qut-al-Qulub or Qut al Qulub al Demerdashiyya, was a female Arab writer. Much confusion arises over her three names as she has been a prominent writer in many languages including Arabic and French. She grew up in Cairo, but eventually fled when the Nasser regime came to power. Her most famous work is Ramza, and while it is considered fiction, many scholars view portions of it through an autobiographical lens. Because of her extensive travels to Europe, (France in particular), Kouloub was very well received abroad. Her work was demanded by many cultures. All of her books were written in French and some have been translated into English, German, Arabic, Dutch, and Indonesian.

== Early life ==
Out El Kouloub was born in 1899 in Cairo, Egypt (though some sources indicate that she was born in 1898). She died in 1968, though the location of her death is largely disputed. It is speculated that she died in Austria but was buried in Italy. She came from a wealthy and prominent family because her ancestors were members of the Turkish courts. Like most Arab families, her father ran the house and Kouloub was raised by the harem. Many of her works talked about the strict culture of being raised by the harem. She was educated at home by governesses and was taught foreign languages as was the expectation for young Egyptian girls in an aristocratic setting.

== Marriage ==
Kouloub was not married until later in life when she reached the age of 25.(Some sources indicate that she married at the age of 23.) It was an arranged marriage and her husband was a lawyer and judge named Mustafa Bey Muktar. After seven years of marriage, four sons and one daughter they were divorced. It has been speculated that this was due to Kouloub's non-traditional nature. She did not take on the submissive role that was expected of women. After the divorce, Kouloub made the children keep her last name instead of their father’s to perpetuate the Demerdashiyya name.

== Public perception ==
The Demerdashiyya family had great wealth and a considerable amount of land. Kouloub herself had a few homes in various places in Egypt in addition to what she inherited from her father. While she was still living, many called her “the richest woman in Egypt.” She was seen as an extremely considerate and kindhearted person. During religious events, she often donated food such as cows and sheep. The people in the surrounding areas were grateful for her presence and helpfulness.

== Later life ==
Between 1933 and 1939, she took many trips to Europe with France being the usual destination. She was fluent in both Arabic and French. Her time in Europe was partially determined by President Gamal Abdel Nasser, whose revolutionary government seized much of her family’s property. She fled Cairo with her sons and ended up in Rome. Kouloub did not want to return to Egypt while he was in power and therefore died without ever going back. She believed that the reforms which Nasser imposed were designed intentionally to destroy her family. It broke her heart to see much of her property seized despite her generous actions in the region. By the time she died she was essentially broke and had very few things to her name.

== Major works ==
=== Ramza ===
One of Kouloub’s most well-known works is Ramza. Jana Braziel performed a literary analysis of this novel, claiming that it is both autobiographically and historically relevant. Braziel asserts in her essay that Ramza speaks for women’s rights in Egypt. Braziel also draws attention to the fact that Kouloub uses many important historical figures in her writing. By doing this, Kouloub emphasizes the severity of what she is saying. Nayra Atiya, English translator of Ramza, tells us that one of Kouloub’s messages was that “ignorance breeds fears and misconceptions and perpetuates mindless superstition.”

=== List of other works ===
A list of her other works include:

- Au hasard de la pensée (1934)
- Harem (1937)
- Trois contes de l'amour et de la mort (1940) (translated into English)
- Zanouba (1947) (translated into English)
- Le coffret hindou (1951)
- La Nuit de la Destinée (1954)
- Hefnaoui le Magnifique (1961)

== Literary themes ==
=== Women's rights ===
Braziel also noted that Kouloub was well known for addressing many issues associated with the hijab. In Ramza, the main character struggles with wearing her hijab. She views it as an oppressive article of clothing and is jealous of those from other cultures who are not forced to wear them. Kouloub felt as though the hijab was a symbol of the limitations placed on women.

Braziel suggests that the character of Ramza serves as an allusion to Huda Sha'arawi because of Ramza’s feelings about the veil. They seem to parallel many of the struggles that Sha'arawi went through as well. Kouloub was Islamic feminist; many of her core values were rooted in her religion, but she still believed that women deserved more of a purpose than what Islam set down for them.

=== Islamic roots ===
Her writing success in Europe was due in large part to her topic of writing. Europe was a little unsettled about Islamic culture and viewed it as a backwards way of life. In addressing the culture she was raised in, she drew a lot of attention from Europeans who were likely curious about her Egyptian upbringing. In this sense, she served as a translator between cultures.

== Bibliography ==
- Atiya, Nayra. "Translator's Introduction." Introduction. Zanouba. Syracuse, NY: Syracuse UP, 1996. N. pag. Print.
- Badran, Margot, and Miriam Cooke. "Qut Al-Qulub." Opening the Gates: A Century of Arab Feminist Writing. Bloomington: Indiana UP, 1990. 244-45. Print.
- Braziel, Jana E. "Islam, individualism and dévoilement in the works of Out El Kouloub and Assia Djebar." The Journal of North African Studies. 3rd ed. Vol. 4`. N.p.: Routledge, 2007. 81-101. Tandfonline.com. Atypon® Literatum. Web. 22 Sept. 2014.
- Rafaat, Samir. "LANDMARK ANALPHABETISM, 3 March 2000." LANDMARK ANALPHABETISM, 3 March 2000. Cairo Times, 3 Mar. 2000. Web. 10 Oct. 2014.
- Seigneurie, K. E. (1995). Space and the colonial encounter in Lawrence Durrell, Out el-Kouloub and Naguib Mahfouz. (Order No. 9610235, University of Michigan). ProQuest Dissertations and Theses, 214-214 p.
- Waugh, Earle H. Visionaries of Silence: The Reformist Sufi Order of the Demirdashiya Al-Khalwatiya in Cairo. Cairo: American U in Cairo, 2008. Print.
