= Duaa Abdelrahman =

Egyptian writer (born 1979)

- Born: 11 November 1979 (age 46); Giza Governorate, Egypt
- Other name: Mashair Ghalia
- Occupation: Novelist

Duaa Abdelrahman (Arabic: دعاء عبد الرحمن; born 11 November 1979) is an Egyptian romance novelist and short story writer. At the beginning of her career, she published her works under the pseudonym Mashair Ghalia and her works are often classified as "social romance".

Her first novel, I discovered My Husband on the Bus (original title: Iktashaftu Zawji fe al-Autobees) was published in 2011. This was followed by three more of her works; Rape, But Under One Roof (original title: Ightisab Wa Laken Taht Saqf Wahed), Not in the Dreams (original title: wala fi al-Ahlam), Execution Time (original title: Ma’ Waqt al-Tanfeeth), in addition to a collection of short stories.

== Life and education ==
Duaa Abdelrahman was born on 11 November 1979 in the governorate of Giza, Egypt. She earned a bachelor's degree in Business and a diploma from the Higher Institute of Islamic Studies.

== Works ==
- Rape, But Under One Roof (original title: Ightisab wa Laken Taht Saqf Wahed)
- Not in the Dreams (original title: Wala Fe al-Ahlam) – In which the writer uses both standard Arabic and non-standard Egyptian Arabic for dialogue between the characters. The novel is characterised by its direct style and direct narration of events.
- I Met My Husband on the Bus (original title: Iktashaftu Zawji fe al-Autobees) – Duaa’s first novel shows extreme realism as it captures the reality that many young adults live in the Arab society. This allows the readers to picture themselves in place of the characters. The novel also discusses religious values and principles, and it expresses profound feelings and ideas.
- Dao Ila Qalilan
- Heart of the Peacock (2021)
- (Even) If After a While (original title: Wa Law Ba’d Heen)
- Execution Time (original title: waqt al-Tanfeeth) – A sense of love and familiarity is represented in the characters of this novel. The writer talks about how committed men and women are capable of enjoying their lives, and that life is not as complicated as is commonly believed. The writer also delivers religious knowledge through her characters in a simple yet distinct manner.
- Imago – A fictional novel that discuses the root changes in human nature and the mental blocks that manifests the self.
- And She Told Me (original title: Wa Qalat Le) – Is a novel that discusses schizophrenia and other psychological matters. The novel presents the social framework and carries many lessons that are directed towards husbands, regarding the treatments of their wives.
