= Ahmad Al-Khamisi =

Egyptian writer and journalist

- أحمد الخميسي
- Born: 28 January 1948 (age 78)
- Occupations: writer, journalist

Ahmad Abdel Rahman Al-Khamisi (born 28 January 1948 in Cairo) is an Egyptian writer and journalist.

== Early life ==
He was raised in a middle-class family. His mother was a teacher, and his father, Abdel Rahman Al-Khamisi, was a famous Egyptian poet and journalist.

== Career ==
Ahmas Al-Khamisi started working in journalism in 1964. Ahmad Al-Khamisi's first short stories were published in Egyptian journals Sabah Al-Kheer and Al-Qessa in 1965. He was introduced to the journal Al-Kateb by a distinguished and well-known writer Yusuf Idris. He published his first short story collection "Dreams, Bird, Carnival" in 1967, and wrote scenario for the film "Respectable Families" in 1968.

In February 1968, Ahmad Al-Khamisi was arrested for participation in Students Demonstrations, spent in prison two and a half years and was finally released in 1971. The next year another scenario for the film "The Violet" was written by him.

In 1972 he left his country for Moscow to complete his studies. He received a PhD in Russian Literature at Moscow State University in 1992. During this time Al-Khamisi was working as a correspondent for Abu Dhabi broadcasting service (1989–1998), for Al Itihad newspaper of Emirates (1991–1998) and for Egyptian magazines Al-Ahaly and Al-Yasar.

Presently Ahmad Al-Khamisi is a Member of Egyptian Journalists' Syndicate and Egyptian Writers' Union. He contributes regularly to several Egyptian and Arabic papers on cultural and political issues.

== Publications ==
While living in Russia he published many books in Cairo:

- Dictionary of Literary Terms. (Translation from Russian, 1992)
- How bitter your Tears were in Dream. (A collection of Russian short stories, Translation, 1985)
- Russian stories and poems for Children. (Translation, 1998, Damask)
- Naguib Mahfouz in the mirrors of Russian Orientalism. (Edited and translated, 1989)
- Secrets of Iraqi/Soviet negotiations during the Gulf Crisis. (Translation, 1991)
- Moscow trusts the tears. (Studies, 1991)
- The war in Chechnya. (Studies, 1996)
- Women of the Kremlin. (Translation, 1997)
- The Smell of Bread. (A collection of Russian short stories, Translation, 1999)
- A piece of Night. (Author's collection of short stories, 2004)
- The closed door between Copts and Muslims in Egypt (Studies, 2008).
