= Mona Al Sabban =

Egyptian film academic

Mona El Sabban
- Born: 1945 (age 80–81); Egypt
- Occupation: Professor
- Employer: Higher Institute of Cinema
- Website: www.arabfilmtvschool.edu.eg/elsabban/Dr_Mona_cv.htm

Mona El Sabban (Arabic: منى الصبان), also known as Mona Elsabban, is a scholar or Arabic cinema and founder of the Arab School for Film and Television. She is a member of the Higher Film Institute in Cairo.

== Life ==
Al Sabban is related to Salah Abu Seif, a forerunner in the adoption of the realism in Arab cinema.

She gained a degree in Cairo Higher Institute of Cinema, specializing in montage.

Al Sabbah has said that in 1999, prior to her project to create a remote learning internet site, she only used internet-related technology for correspondence purposes.

Al Sabban has written a number of books including: The Art of Montage in Television Dramas and the World of Electronic Film, Creative Montage — A study in the historical development of the dimensions of montage creation, and I and the Montage.

In June 2021 in socially distanced secret voting by the Supreme Council of Culture based from the Cairo Opera House Al Sabban was jointly awarded, with Sherif Mohi El-Din, a State Award for Excellence In the field of arts at the State Appreciation Awards.

== Opinions ==
Speaking of her view of Egyptian cinema in 2019 Al Saddan said "Cinema is a mirror of society. The collapse in Egyptian cinema is the result of the collapse in Egyptian society. Therefore, we are not surprised by the cinematic deterioration in Egypt.".

== Arab School for Film and Television ==
One reason for the establishment of the online school was Al Sabban's realisation not all potential students could travel to the Cairo Higher Institute of Cinema for study. Al Sabbah notes the trigger for the idea related to her preparing a working paper on "Film education on the Internet" at a conference in held at American University of Beirut in November 1999 with the theme "“Distance Education for Media.” From that conference Al Sabban says she was encouraged to set up the school. The project was presented to the Egyptian Cultural Development Fund, who approved the project in July 2001. The school was opened by Suzanne Mubarak in October 2001.

The operation of the school is via free online study from content on the website for those who register.There is no gender, religious, or educational barriers to prospective students. Online examinations are held quarterly in the topics of script, directing, photography, montage, and sound.

In 2006 Al Sabban explained that many of the students at that time had practical experience of cinematography but lacked the theoretical background. For those that lacked practical experience but had passed the exams the school was attempting to organize workshops to be available in several Arab centres.
