= Mohamed Nagui =

Egyptian writer

- Born: January 1, 1947; Samanoud, Minya, Egypt
- Died: November 19, 2014 (aged 68); Paris, France
- Occupations: Writer and Novelist
- Known for: “Khafia Qamar” (The Hidden Moon)
- Notable work: “Lahn al-Sabah” (Morning's Melody), “Maqamat Arabiya” (Arab Keys), “Leilat Safar” (Departure night) and “Qas & Nelly.”
- Awards: 2009 Egyptian Writers Union "Award of Excellence". 2013 State Excellence Award in Literature (Egypt)

Mohamed Nagui (Arabic: محمد ناجي), an award-winning Egyptian writer and novelist, is the author of several well-known novels, including 'Al-Affendy', 'Morning Song' and 'Travel Night'. His last book, 'Prayers of Forgetting', was published in 2011, and dealt with his personal battle with cancer.

== Early life ==
Mohamed Nagui was born in 1947 in the city of Samanoud, located in the Minya governorate. As a young man, Nagui began writing poems, many of which were published in Arab magazines. He earned his degree from the Faculty of Arts and soon after served in the military from 1969 to 1974. Nagui went on to establish a career in journalism, working for various news outlets, and even serving as an editor for the Arabic-language newspaper Liberation Today.

== Literary career ==
Over the course of his life, Nagui's artistic style varied, going from writing poems to writing novels. Yet, his works share the common theme of being about the human experience and connecting with nature. His works sometimes took on a political undertone - one of his most well-known works, the 2008 novel El-Effendi (also transliterated as al-Affandi, or just "Effendi" in English), for example, was a "criticism of [a] middle class obsessed with chasing monetary and personal gain at the expense of the nation and society." Yet, even with this story, Nagui resisted the temptation to produce purely political works, with one critic noting how: "On the surface, Mohamed Nagui's The Effendi looks like another one of those anger-laden books about the corruption eating contemporary Egypt from the inside out...[But] Nagui uses the by now clichéd template of the Egyptian young man who snakes his way up using unethical short-cuts and sleight-of-hand, and turns it over its head by writing something closer to a modern fairytale." In his works, Nagui shows a special affinity for the city of Alexandria, with one author noting how he and other "Proto-Modernists" like Mahmoud Said used Alexandria, "that most promiscuous of cities", as a model for what constitutes "Egyptianness". To date, Nagui remains widely regarded as one of the most influential writers to have ever come from the pan-Arab region.

== Death ==
Upon being diagnosed with Hepatitis C, Mohamed Nagui was forced to stop writing. Nagui received therapeutic sessions in Paris, while friends and family hoped he would be able to once again return to producing literary works. In his last interview with Asharq Al-Awsat newspaper, Nagui spoke of his disease saying, “I had been through harder and more dangerous circumstances than this fatal disease. In fact, there is something harder than death which is the need to compromise over your values. This is the moment where you actually wish to die in order not to do so.” After a 4-year battle with his disease, Nagui died on November 19, 2014 in Paris, while recovering from a liver transplant the week prior, and was buried in the journalist's cemetery in the 6th of October City
