= Ihab Husni =

Egyptian writer and lawyer

- Born: 4 July 1966 (age 60); Cairo, Egypt
- Resting place: Saudi Arabia
- Education: Cairo University
- Occupations: writer, novelist, lawyer
- Years active: 1995–present
- Awards: Katara Prize for Arabic Novel

Ihab Husni (Arabic: إيهاب حسني; born 1966) is an Egyptian writer and lawyer. He has published numerous children's books, short stories collections and novels, including the novel The Last Lesson, which won the Katara Prize for Arabic Novel in 2019.

== Education and career ==
Ihab Husni was born in Cairo, Egypt on 4 July 1966. He graduated from Cairo University and obtained a bachelor's degree in law in 1989. Then he studied at the Higher Institute of Dramatic Arts at the Academy of Dramatic Arts for two years.

Husni has held several positions, including assistant to the president of the National Center for Creativity in 1992, assistant to the president of the National Center for Theater, Music, and Folk Art, a secretary to the editor of The Music Heritage magazine, and the position of legal advisor to the Egyptian Writers Union and the Egyptian Writers Association. Also, he was deputy editor of "Al Haqaiq" newspaper in 2006. He is currently residing the Souad al-Sabahi Arabia and working as a legal advisor.

Husni started his literary career in 1995, when he published his first collection of short stories entitled The Game of Silence issued by the Egyptian General Authority for Book. He has also written three plays, including the play Nasoot, which won the Dr. Souad al-Sabah Prize in 1992. While his play The Scarab won the Sharjah Prize for Theatrical Writing in 2005. He has several publications in children's literature and scientific books, including the book Blood in the Alhambra – Intention of the Most Important Document in the History of the Arabs in Spain. In 2019, Husni won the Katara Prize for Arabic Novel for his novel The Last Lesson.

== Awards ==
- 1992: His play "Nasoot" won the Souad al-Sabah Prize for playwriting.
- 1996: His short story "The Last Port" won the award of the Egyptian Embassy in Riyadh.
- 2005: His play "The Scarb" won the Sharjah Prize for Theatrical Writing.
- 2019: His novel "The Last Lesson" won the Katara Prize for Arabic Novel.
