= Mireille Vincendon =

French-language Egyptian writer

Mireille Vincendon, née Kramer (born 1910) was a French-language Egyptian writer. She wrote two collections of poetry, short stories and a novel.

== Life ==
Mereille Kramer was born in Cairo in 1910 to an Egyptian mother and Russian father, and was educated at French schools. She married Jacques Vincendon, director of the Land Bank of Egypt.

Encouraged by the composer Florent Schmitt, for whom she wrote words to be set to music, Vincendon took up literary activity in the late 1940s, publishing in the Egyptian French-language press. In 1956 she left Egypt and settled in Paris.

Vincendon's poetry "revolves around existential concerns and the limits of language". Like surrealist poetry, her free verse contained violent metaphor, though without surrealism's particular theoretical commitments. Her novel Annabel's Notebooks mixed fantasy and reality to tell the story of a girl at a French-speaking boarding-school in Egypt.

== Works ==
- Le Dialogue des ombres [The Dialogue of Shades]. Paris: P. Seghers, 1953.
- Le Nombre du silence [The Number of Silence]. Paris: P. Seghers, 1955.
- Les Cahiers d'Annabelle [The Notebooks of Annabelle]. Paris: Mercure de France, 1957.
