= Affaf Tobbala =

Egyptian television documentary director and writer

- Born: 12 July, 1941; Cairo
- Citizenship: Egypt
- Education: Cairo University
- Occupations: television documentary director, producer and author

Affaf Tobbala (born July 12, 1941) is an Egyptian television documentary director and producer and an author, primarily of children's literature. Tobbala has been nominated for and received a number of literary awards in Egypt and abroad. Her 2006 book, Sika and Mokka, received the 2007 Suzan Mubarak Prize for Children's Literature and was included on the 2010 International Board on Books for Young People (IBBY) List of Honor.

== Life ==
Tobbala was born in Cairo on July 12, 1941, to a middle-class family. She married in 1960 after finishing her secondary education at a French missionary school. Tobbala has two children, born in 1962 and 1964. She received a Bachelor of Arts degree in French literature (1965) and a Master of Arts degree (1987) and PhD (1996) in mass communications from Cairo University.

Tobbala worked in Egyptian television as a director, screenwriter and producer from 1966 to 2001, specialising in documentaries. She also held a number of managerial positions in the areas of planning and programming. Since 1987, Tobbala has taught courses in television and documentary production to undergraduate students and young broadcasting professionals in several schools (including Cairo University).

She began writing books for children in 2005, at age 64. Tobbala collaborated with watercolor painter Adly Rezkallah on her first book, The Silver Fish, which received a mention in the Bologna Children's Book Fair Ragazzi Award's New Horizons category and Egypt's Suzan Mubarak Prize.

She has published 13 more books for children and a short-story collection, collaborating with a number of artists using different styles and techniques. Writing for different age groups, Tobbala has received national, regional and international awards. Several of her books have been translated from Arabic into English, Turkish and Korean.

== Filmography ==
- Muaadala (Equation): five-episode documentary (1979)
- Elsharia Almasry (The Egyptian Street): five-episode documentary about historic Cairo (1980-1981)
- Mawdue Lelmunaqashah (Discussion Topic): political-documentary series with round-table discussions (1982-1984)
- Shuun Saghira (Small Affairs): six-episode documentary about customs with unwanted social effects (1990)

== Bibliography ==
- Al-samaka Al-faddia (The Silver Fish), illustrated by Adly Rizqallah. Nahdet Masr, 2005
- Sika We Mokka (Sika and Mokka), illustrated by Mohamad Nabil. Nahdet Masr, 2006
- Hilm Gadid (A New Dream), illustrated by Hanadi Sileet. Nahdet Masr, 2007
- Awraq Qadima (Old Papers), illustrated by Hanadi Sileet. Nahdet Masr, 2009
- Dom ... Tata ... Dom, illustrated by Samar Salahedine. Nahdet Masr, 2008
- Al-Bait Wa Annakhlah (The House and the Palm Tree), illustrated by Hanadi Sileet. Nahdet Masr, 2009
- Haneen (Hannen), illustrated by Manal Rashed. Nahdet Masr, 2009
- Trak ... Tata ... Trak, illustrated by Samar Salahedine. Nahdet Masr, 2010
- Al-Ayn (The Eye), illustrated by Hanadi Sileet. Nahdet Masr, 2010
- Hola ... Tata ... Hola, illustrated by Samar Salahedine. Nahdet Masr, 2011
- Oud Al Sanabel (Stick of Racemes), illustrated Hanadi Sileet. Nahdet Masr, 2013 ISBN 9789771446002
- Unshudat Al-Awdah (The Homecoming Song), illustrated by Reem Heiba. Nahdet Masr, 2014
- Shams (Sun), illustrated by Hanadi Sileet. Nahdet Masr, 2016
- Sayakun Li Asdeqaa (I Will Have Friends), illustrated by Hanadi Sileet. Nahdet Masr, 2017

== Awards and honours ==
The Silver Fish was mentioned in the New Horizons category of the 2006 Bologna Book Fair for Children's Literature Ragazzi Awards, and received Egypt's Award for Children's Literature (then the Suzan Mubarak Prize) that year. Sika and Mokka received the 2007 Suzan Mubarak Prize, and was included in the 2010 IBBY List of Honor. Dom ... Tata ... Dom was shortlisted for the 2009 Etisalat Award for Arabic Children's Literature. Old Papers was one of 10 books in the Anna Lindh Foundation's 2010 Honor List for Children's Books in the Arab World.

The House and the Palm Tree received the 2011 Sheikh Zayed Award for Children's Literature in the Arab World. It was the January 2012 book of the month of the Arab Book Forum Readers' Club. The Eye received the 2011 Anna Lindh Foundation's Arab Children's Literature Award. Oud Al Sanabel received the 2013 Etisalat Award for Arab Children's Literature, and was nominated by the Egyptian Board on Books for Young People (EBBY) for the 2016 Hans Christian Andersen Award.
