= Franciscan High School =

School in New York, United States

Coordinates: 41°19′35″N 73°51′34″W

Franciscan High School was founded in 1899 as Ladycliff Academy, a boarding school for girls run by the Franciscan Missionary Sisters of the Sacred Heart of Peekskill, New York. It was renamed and opened to boys in the early 1970s, and closed in 1991.

== History ==
The school was originally located on the grounds of Ladycliff College, in Highland Falls, NY, next to West Point Military Academy.

In September 1961, under the guidance and direction of the principal, Mother Mary Philip, FMSC the academy moved to Mohegan Lake, NY.

In the early 1970s, the order decided to admit boys, and established the school as co-ed with the new name of "Franciscan High School." It remained in operation under that name until 1991.
