= Ahmed Kafafi =

Egyptian writer, narrator, and journalist

Ahmed Shablool
- أحمد كفافي
- Born: Cairo, Egypt
- Occupations: A writer and a storyteller (previous journalist)
- Notable work: "Baby online" (original title: Habibi online) in 2010. "Confused Ant" (original title: Namulah Hayrah) in 2003.

Ahmed kafafi (Arabic: أحمد كفافي) is an Egyptian writer and narrator (previous journalist) and a member in the Egyptian Writers Union. He wrote many novels, the most common is "Baby online" (Habibi online) which was published in 2010, he also wrote a number of story collections, the most common are "Confused Ant" (Namulah Hayrah) which was published in 2003, and "Ladies shower" (Dush sayedat) which was published in 2015.

== Early life ==
Ahmed Kafafi was born in Cairo, Egypt where he studied and lived. In the middle school, he started writing some booklets. when he started studying in the college of English literature in Cairo University, he started to be known locally.

== Career ==
Ahmed Kafifi got into writing short fictions and novels since he was a middle school student until he published some of his booklets as a university student. He worked as an English teacher for many years, then a reporter and a journalist in English newspapers and magazines in the gulf region. Ahmed Kafafi says that working in the investigation sections played an affective role in developing his research skills in English literature. Ahmed Kafafi published a number of comic and news investigations both in Arabia and English, analyses and journal reports.

"Call to death" (da3uah lilmout) was his first novel that was published in 1990, he discussed euthanasia, which was an argumentative topic in the Islamic and in the west nation. He discussed co-dependence love in his novel "In between" (Bain bain) in 1993, which was liked by reviewers and readers. In 1995 his first story collection"muthakart Aanes" (maiden diary) and was translated to English in 2005. In one of his interviews, Kafafi confirmed that he had focused in this story collection on the new concept of the spinsterhood in the Arab world, after being described as ugly and oppressive. He said the novel differed in its form, which contained social tales that were told within short narratives. Its content, which helped spread the novel 10 years later, in websites like "spinster to change" or "leave her until she is a spinster". These websites defended women in front of men in order not to be forced to marriage. According to the writer, the objection of men to marriage because of financial reasons or other related to the link between the independence of a woman and her being a spinster.

Kafafi published his second story collection "Confused Ant" (Namulah Hayrah) in 2003 (translated into English in 2004). This collection is considered a true translation of his journalistic work because it presents the reality of conflicts in the Arab world and the victims of men, women and children as stated in the introduction of the collection. The most common story of the collection is "Night of Farah" (Laylat Farah), which shows a struggle of an Iranian woman and an Iraqi woman to win the remains of an unknown soldier. They both believe that is her son Farah.

In the early of 2010, Kafafi published his novel entitled "Baby online" (Habibi online), which had approximately 400 pages. The author got famous after the success of this novel. "Baby online" is classified as the first Arabic novel written as a conversation between two people via the internet. The novel then raised many questions, the first of which was the using internet technologies in narrating the novels and short fictions, and the appearance of the virtual reality.

== Works ==
This is a list of his works:

- "Call to death" (original title: da3uah lilmout) in 1990.
- "In between" (original title: Bain bain) in 1993.
- "Baby online" (original title: Habibi online) in 2010.
- "Beggars in the Summer of January" (original tile: Alshahateh fi fasel saif yanayer) in 2013.

Most notably of his story collections:

- "Muthakart Aanes" (original title: Maiden diary) in 1995.
- "Confused Ant" (original title: Namulah Hayrah) in 2003.
- "Ladies shower" (original title: Dush sayedat) and other collections in 2015.
