= Hala El Badry =

Egyptian journalist

- Born: 1954
- Citizenship: Egypt
- Education: Cairo University
- Occupation(s): Journalist, novelist
- Notable work: Muntaha, Imra'atun ma (A Certain Woman), (Cities of the Walls)

Hala El Badry (born 1954 in Cairo), a graduate of Cairo University, is an Egyptian journalist and novelist. She is deputy editor of an Egyptian radio and television magazine.

Muntaha, a novel published in 1995, is set in the fictional village of Muntaha in the Nile Delta. Imra'atun ma (A Certain Woman), Hala El Badry's fourth book, was named best novel of 2001 at the Cairo International Book Fair.

== Early life ==
Hala El Badry (born 1954 in Cairo) is an Egyptian journalist and author. She obtained a diploma in Journalism from the Faculty of Media in 1988 and a Bachelor of Arts in Commerce from Cairo University in 1975. El Badry served as the Chairperson of the Board of Directors and Editor-in-Chief of Egyptian Radio and Television Magazine. From 1975 to 1980, she worked as the Baghdad correspondent for Rose Al-Youssef Magazine.

== Awards ==
- State Excellence Award in Literature, 2012
- Best Novel Award at the Cairo International Book Fair, 2001 for "A Certain Woman"
- Best Novel Award at the Cairo International Book Fair, 2018 for "Cities of the Walls".

== Works ==
- Muntaha. 1995
  - Muntaha. Translated by Nancy Roberts. Cairo: American University in Cairo Press, 2006. ISBN 978-977-416-005-9 Selected pages
- Imra'atun ma. 2001
  - A Certain Woman. Translated by Farouk Abdel Wahab. Cairo: American University in Cairo Press, 2003. ISBN 978-977-416-028-8; London: Arabia Books, 2008. ISBN 978-1-906697-07-5 Selected pages
