= Muhammad Jamal Saqr =

Egyptian writer, academic and poet

- Born: March 20, 1966 (age 59); Egypt
- Education: Cairo University
- Occupation(s): Writer; Poet; Professor

Muhammad Jamal Saqr (Arabic: محمد جمال صقر; born March 20, 1966) is an Egyptian writer, academic, and poet, specializing in Arabic language sciences, especially grammar, morphology and presentation. He works as an assistant professor at the Faculty of Dar al-Ulum at Cairo University.

== Education ==
He obtained a bachelor's degree in 1987 in Arabic language sciences and literature and Islamic sciences and literature from the Faculty of Dar Al-Ulum, Cairo University. He also obtained a master's degree from the same department in 1993 from the Department of Syntax, Morphology and Presentation, with a thesis entitled "Arabic Proverbs: A Syntactic Study through the Proverbs Complex for the Field" (Original title: al'amthal alearabiatu: dirasat nahwiat min khilal mujmae al'amthal lilmaydani), and a Ph.D. in 1996 with a thesis entitled "The relationship of poetry presentations with its grammatical structure" (Original title: ealaqat eurud alshier bibinayih alnahwi).

== Career ==
He worked in 1988 after his graduation as a teaching assistant, in the Department of Grammar, Morphology and Presentations at the Faculty of Dar Al-Ulum, Cairo University. He then was promoted to an assistant teacher in 1993 and a teacher in 1996. In 1997 he moved to Sultan Qaboos University and worked as an assistant professor in the Department of Arabic Language in the College of Arts and Social Sciences Until 2003, he also worked in 2005 and 2006 as a visiting consultant at the same university, before returning to Cairo University and Dar Al-Ulum College as an assistant professor.

=== Works ===
· "Trends in Education" (Original title: atijahat fi altarbiat waltaelimi), Dar Al Maaref, 1998.

· "Old Arabic Proverbs: A Syntactic Study"(Original title: al'amthal alearabiat alqadimati: dirasat nahwiatun), Al-Aliaa Institution for Publishing and Distribution, Cairo, 2000.

· "The Relationship of Poetry Presentations to Its Grammatical Structure"(Original title: ealaqat eurud alshier bibinayih alnahwi), Al-Aliaa Institution for Publishing and Distribution, Cairo, 2000.

· "Serb al-Wahsh: Accidental Textual Research"(Original title: sarab alwahsh: 'abhath nasiyat eurudiatin), Al-Aliaa Institution for Publishing and Distribution, Cairo, 2006

· "If the text is true: textual grammatical research"(Original title: 'iidha saha alnas: 'abhath nasiyat nahwiatin), Al-Aliaa Institution for Publishing and Distribution, Cairo, 2007

· "The Phenomenon of Morphological Compatibility"(Original title: zahirat altawafuq aleurudii alsarfii), Al-Hani Library, Cairo, 2007

· "Najat from Artistic Prose: Articles and Maqamat"(Original title: njat min alnathr alfaniy: mqalat wamaqamati), The Saudi Foundation in Egypt, 2007

· "Najat from Artistic Prose: Articles and Maqamat: Part Two"(Original title: njat min alnathr alfaniy: mqalat wamaqamati: aljuz' althaania), Al-Aliaa Institution for Publishing and Distribution, Cairo, 2007

· "The Merbid Stick: Accidental Textual Research"(Original title: easa almirbadi: 'abhath nasiyat eurudiatin), Bainyadi for printing, publishing and distribution, 2008

· "The Guide for the Intellectuals: A Approach to Writing Between Books of Science and Her Students Connecting Their Lives to Hers"(Original title: dalil almutathaqifina: manhaj fi altaalif bayn kutub aleilm wabayn tulaabiha buasal hayatahum bihayatiha), Imam Al-Bukhari Library, 2009

· "The skill of Arabic writing: a funny and beneficial experience for students of Arabic sciences and literature"(Original title: maharat alkitabat alearabiati: tajribat tarifat nafieat litulaab eulum alearabiat wadiabha), Dar Al-Salaam for printing, publishing, distribution and translation, 2010

· "Nadim the Grammarians"(Original title: ndim alnahwiiyna), Dar El Kemary, 2014

· "Baraa: A Divan of Poetry"(Original title: diwan shaear), Al-Aliaa Institution for Publishing and Distribution and Dar Al-Qamari, 2014

== Awards ==
· Iqra Charitable Foundation Award, Cairo, 1994, for his poetry collection "Lubna"

· Iqra Foundation Charitable Award, Cairo, 1995, for his poem "Soulat Al-Bara' bin Malik Al-Ansari"

· Cairo University Club Award, 1996, for his poem "Soulat Al-Bara’ bin Malik Al-Ansari”

· Cairo University Club Award, 1997, for his story "Camel"

· Cairo University Incentive Award, in the field of humanities and education, the academic year 2006–07
