= Walaa Kamal =

British-Egyptian writer

- Born: 1984 (age 41–42); United Kingdom
- Education: BA in Mass Communication
- Alma mater: Ain Shams University; American University of Cairo
- Occupations: Writer, translator, journalist
- Years active: 2017–present

Walaa Kamal (Arabic: ولاء كمال) is a British-Egyptian writer and translator who was born in the United Kingdom. He published three books including Silence, Sayed and the Gand, and 730 Days of Cairokee.

== Biography ==
Walaa Kamal, a British-Egyptian writer and translator, was born in the United Kingdom on 1984. He moved to Egypt in 2000 and studied at the Ain Shams University where he obtained his bachelor's degree in Mass Communication. Years later, he studied translation at the American University in Cairo. Then, he studied at the Academy of Cinema Arts and Technology. In 2017, Kamal published his first book after five years of writing it titled "Silence" which was published by Sama Publishing and Production and Distribution and was released at the Cairo International Book Fair in its 48 session. In 2018, he published his second book "Sayed and the Gang". A year later, he published "730 Days with Cairokee". His last book was chosen among the best books for 2019. In his last book, Kamal writers about his journey with the Egyptian rock band "Cairokee" in which he documents their lives on and off the stage and the struggles they faced since the beginning of their artistic career. Kamal has also translated some books including One Belt, One Road – China's and the New Eurasian Century by William Engdahl which was published at the Abu Dhabi International Book Fair, 2017.

== Bibliography ==
=== Books ===
- "Silence" (original title: Sukoon"), 2017
- "Sayed and the Gang" (original title: Sayed w al A'saba), 2018
- "730 Days with Cairokee" (original title: Ayami Maa Cairokee), 2019

=== Translation ===
- Al Qarn Al Rawasi, Mashroo Al Hizam w Al Tareq (original title: One Belt, One Road – China's and the New Eurasian Century" by William Engdahl.
