= Lutis Abd Al Karim =

Egyptian writer

- Born: Alexandria, Egypt
- Citizenship: Egypt
- Occupation: Writer

Lutis Abd Al Karim is an Egyptian writer, and a member of the Supreme Council of Culture, the Council of Foreign Affairs, and the Board of Directors of Fine Art Critics.

== Early life and education ==
Lutis Abd Al Karim was born in Alexandria, and belongs to a family that was interested in and worked in the arts, literature and politics. Her uncle Amin Othman Pasha was Minister of Finance during the royal era. He was assassinated by Egyptian Army Officers including Anwar Sadat. Her grandfather, the writer Muhammad Bey Othman, was a founding member of the National Party with Mustafa Kamil Pasha in 1907 AD.

She graduated from Alexandria University, Department of Philosophy, and received a master's degree in Social Sciences from the University of London, and a Doctorate in Philosophy from the Sorbonne University in Paris.

== Career ==
Abd Al Karim spent most of her life outside Egypt, in Asia and Europe. She published memoirs at regular intervals describing her experiences. She taught at the University of Tokyo and wrote about the people of Japan and its traditions.

Abd Al Karim has devoted symposia in its cultural salon attended by politicians and senior writers, and celebrates in it, as well as in Al-Shamwa magazine, which specializes in the memory of writers and writers, which it chaired, such as Taha Hussein, Tawfiq Al-Hakim, Abdul Wahab, Umm Kulthum, Baligh Hamdi, Nizar Qabbani, Sayed Makkawi, Mustafa Amin, Al-Akkad, Youssef Idris, Mustafa Mahmoud, Youssef Wehbe, Sana Jamil, Muhammad Al-Mouji, Queen Farida, Hussein Bekar, Salah Taher, Sabri Mawd Morsi, Mahmood and others.

=== Author ===
Abd Al Karim has written several books about prominent cultural icons. Subjects of her books include the prominent musician Mohamed Abdel Wahab, the writers Youssef El Sebaei and Ihsan Abdel Quddus, and the dean of theatre, Youssef Wehbe.

In 1993, she published a book about Queen Farida where she discussed the deep friendship that developed between them when the Queen chose her studio and the art hall that she creates in the house of Lotus Abdel Karim. The Candles Hall was the first private art hall in Egypt, and it continued to present the works of senior artists after the Queen's departure.

In 2008, she wrote another book about Queen Farida entitled "Queen Farida and I - a biography that the Queen of Egypt did not write" from the "Kitab Al-Youm" series, which is issued monthly by Akhbar Al-Youm Foundation. She also wrote a book on the same series in December 2008 entitled "Mustafa Mahmoud.. The Question of Existence between Religion, Science and Philosophy", and headed the editorship of "The Book of Candles", which was published by Al-Shamou' magazine, and in it the book Tawfiq Al-Hakim. One Hundred Years was published with submission and supervision.
