= Gamila El Alaily =

- جميلة العلايلي
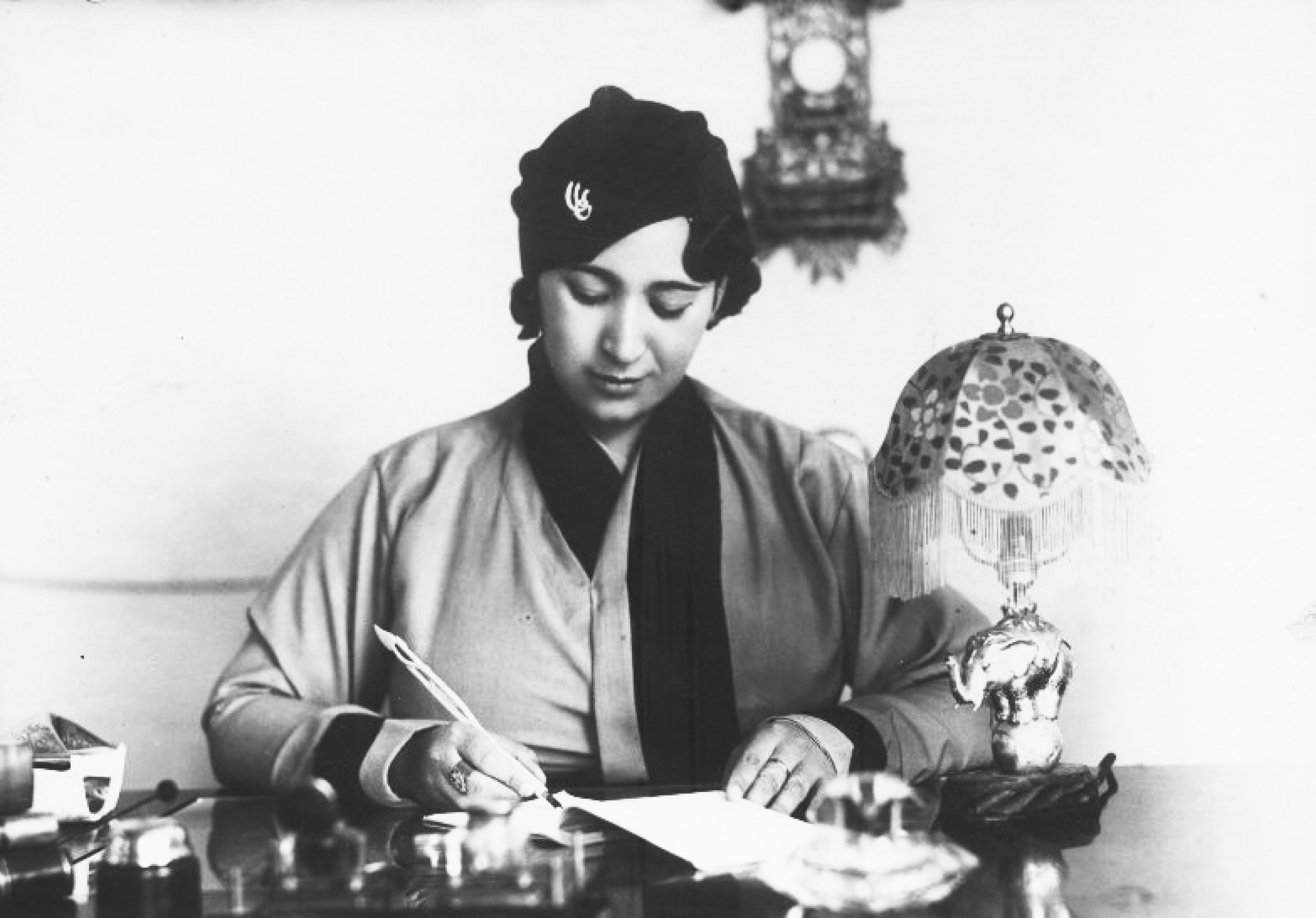
- Gamila El Alaily in the 1950s sitting at her desk
- Born: 20 March 1907; Mansoura, Egypt
- Died: 11 April 1991 (aged 84); Cairo, Egypt
- Occupations: Poet; writer; novelist
- Writing career
- Language: Arabic
- Period: 1927–1989
- Subjects: Romance; social; spirituality; nature; pan-Arabism
- Notable works: Echoes of My Dreams (صدى احلامى), Echoes of My Faith (صدى ايمانى), Poetic Heartbeats (نبضات شاعرة), The Wandering Bird (الطائر الحائر), The Guardian (الراعية)
- Literary movement: Modernist; neo-romanticism; Apollo Society
- Website: www.gamilaelalaily.com

Signature stamp

Gamila El Alaily (in Arabic جميلة العلايلي born in Mansoura, Egypt 20 March 1907, died 11 April 1991) was an Egyptian poet and novelist who confronted ideas that were then socially accepted by educated men about women. As the first female member of the previously all male Apollo Poet Society, she was a pioneer women in the literary scene in Egypt and an influential modernist.

== Biography ==
Gamila El Alaily was born in 1907 into a very conservative family in al-Mansoura, Egypt, which is located in the country's Nile River Delta region. To spare her family any potential public embarrassment because of her writings, she did not publish using her real name, but, she did become an active young writer. While she was still living in Mansoura, she formed her own literary association called Family of Culture, and established the Writers of Arabism Association and al-Ahdaf magazine.

When she moved to Cairo in the 1950s and got married, she established a literary salon hoping to emulate that of the famous writer and salon holder Mayy Ziyadah (1886–1941), who was credited with spurring Arab language literature through her salon regimen, held at the Ziyadah home in Cairo on Tuesday evenings for 23 years.

== Work ==
According to Radwa Ashour, et al., female writers at that time experienced restrictive challenges that encouraged many writers, including El Alaily, to write poetry as a way to express their emotions. Some of the other female poets of her time included Rawhiya al-Qallini, Jalila Rida, Malak ‘Abd al-‘Aziz, Safiya Abu Shadi, Hayfa’ al-Shanawani, and Sufi ‘Abd Allah. According to Ashour, El Alaily and all of these other poets "championed self-expression and wrote about love and passion, advocated freedom, broke with the constraints of tradition, and often used images taken from nature". Ashour continues,

"Some poets chose to avoid the forbidden zones in their poetry and restricted themselves to public issues, while others broke taboos and addressed topics that had long been inaccessible to women. The critical celebration of "women's poetry" illustrated the extent of society's acceptance or rejection of women's entry to the public sphere. On one hand, women poets were critically acclaimed the more they spoke in a confessional tone, rebelled, and broke taboos; on the other hand, they were also subjected to a critical-moral attack that ascribed the popularity of 'the literature of the liberated, rebel women' to the control that restrictions and taboos exercised on their minds."

=== Poetry ===
Gamila El Alaily joined the Apollo Group in the 1930s. She regularly published in the society's journal, and produced three volumes of her own poetry while in the literary circles. She published her first collection of poetry, Sada ahlami (The Echo of My Dreams) in 1936. She also created a self-published monthly newsletter, "Literary Goals" throughout her life.

She was always aware of the difficult social climate in which Egyptian women were writing poetry. She was known for rebelling against several constraints often imposed on poets, even poetry's traditional form and content; she wrote free verse and prose poetry, as well as lyric poetry that extolled nature's beauty and the eternal natural freedom of the universe and creation. Her passion for nature was not limited to those phenomena that are tangible. Rather, nature became more of an approach and inspiration, becoming a philosophical treatment of existence, life and death. In Egypt, society's conflicting views about the traditional roles of women as they began to "storm the bastion of Arabic culture" made the path faced by El Alaily and her contemporaries even more difficult and making their success even more remarkable.

=== Novels ===
Gamila El Alaily wrote novels, including al-Ta’ir al-ha’ir (The Confused Bird) (1935), in which she directly discussed the relationship between men and women in a society that was rapidly changing.

With another novel published in 1947, Arwah tata’allaf (Souls in Harmony), El Alaily engaged in a cultural battle where she confronted a series of widely accepted ideas held about women by educated men. The novel is set up as a series of letters between an Egyptian writer named Mayy and a revolutionary journalist named Sa‘id." (The author's famous Cairo friend, salon-holder Mayy Ziyadah, conducted a prolific longtime correspondence with poet Kahlil Gibran, which began in 1912 and the letters were later published in several languages. Mayy is thought to have served as inspiration for El Alaily's 1947 book, which was published after Mayy's death in 1941.)

=== Magazines ===
She also published in al-Nahda al-Misriya, a women's magazine, and in al-Mar’a al-Misriya and her poems appeared in Abullu.

== Selected publications ==
According to WorldCat there are 16 books authored by Gamila El Alaily (using the spelling Jamila al-'Alayili), all in Arabic, that are held libraries worldwide as of 2020.

- al-Rāʻiyah: majmūʻat qiṣaṣ, [Alexandria]: [al-Maṭbaʻah al-Fārūqīyah], [193-?]
- al-Ṭāʼir al-ḥāʼir, Mīt Ghamr: Maṭbaʻat Wādī al-Nīl, 1935
- Hindīyah, [Cairo]: Dār al-Taʼlīf, [between 1900 and 1999]
- Ṣadá aḥlāmī, al-Iskandarīyah: Maṭbaʻat al-Taʻāwun, [1936]
- al-Amīrah, al-Fajālah: Maṭbaʻat Saʻd Miṣr, 1939
- Rasūl al-Rasūl Jalālat al-Malik Khālid ibn ʻAbd al-ʻAzīz, Malik al-Mamlakah al-ʻArabīyah al-Suʻūdīyah, [publisher not identified], [1978]
- Īmān al-īmān, [Cairo]: Maṭbaʻat al-Ṣāwī, [19--]
- al-Nāsik, [Cairo]: al-Hayʼah al-Miṣrīyah al-ʻĀmmah lil-Kitāb, 1972
- Bayna abawayn: qiṣṣah, [Cairo]: al-Majlis al-Aʻlá lil-Thaqāfah, 1981
- Nabaḍāt shāʻirah: shiʻr, [Cairo]: al-Hay'ah al-Miṣrīyah al-ʻĀmmah lil-Kitāb, 1981
- Bayna abawayn: qiṣṣah, [Cairo]: al-Majlis al-Aʻlá lil-Thaqāfah, 1981
- Nabaḍāt shāʻirah: shiʻr, [Cairo]: al-Hay'ah al-Miṣrīyah al-ʻĀmmah lil-Kitāb, 1981
- Hindīyah, [Cairo]: Dār al-Taʼlīf, [between 1900 and 1999]
- Jamīlah al-ʻAlāyilī tuqaddimu Qaṭarāt min al-ḥubb al-ilāhī. [Cairo]: Maṭbaʻat Dār al-Taʼlīf, 1985
- Amānī: qiṣṣah Miṣrīyah, [publisher not identified], [194-?]

== Tributes ==
In March 2019, Alaily was featured in a Google Doodle celebrating her 112th birthday.

== See also ==
- Women's literary salons and societies in the Arab world
- The Arab Human Development Report:Towards the Rise of Women in the Arab World
