= Rawhiya al-Qallini =

- Born: 1915; Desouk, Egypt
- Died: 1980 (aged 64–65)
- Occupation: Poet

Rawhiya al-Qallini (1915–1980) was an Egyptian poet and cultural center director.

== Life ==
Born in Desouk, al-Qallini was the daughter of a sheikh who sent her to Tanta, Egypt for primary school; for her secondary education she went to Alexandria. She received her bachelor's degree in Arabic from Cairo University in 1942, whereupon she traveled to Iraq to direct a girls' school in Mosul. Two years later she returned to Cairo, where she worked first in a primary and later in a secondary school. She was the founder of the Union of Women University Students in Egypt, and later directed the General Department of Sabbaticals and Cultural Centers.

She published eight volumes of poetry during her career, beginning with A Heart's Supplications in 1959 and finishing with The Nectar of Memories in the year of her death.

She was a contemporary of several other female poets of that time: Jamila al-'Alayili, Jalila Rida, Malak ‘Abd al-‘Aziz, Safiya Abu Shadi, Hayfa’ al-Shanawani, and Sufi ‘Abd Allah.
