= Gamal al-Ghitani =

Egyptian author, literary editor and commentator

Gamal al-Ghitani ORE
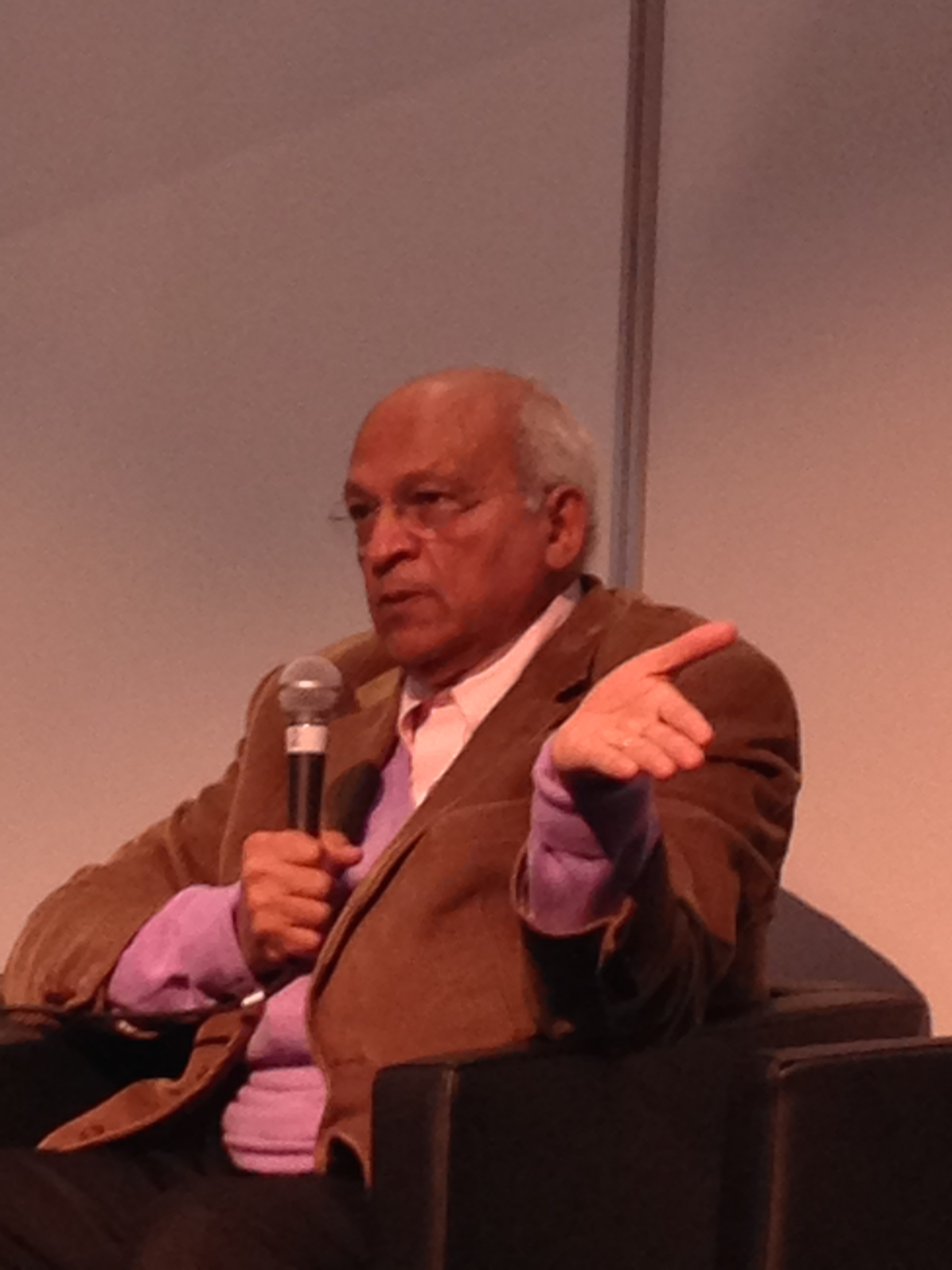
- 2014
- Born: 9 May 1945; Juhaynah, Sohag Governorate, Egypt
- Died: 18 October 2015 (aged 70); Cairo, Egypt
- Occupations: Journalist, author, novelist

Gamal al-Ghitani (Arabic: جمال الغيطانى, IPA: [ɡæˈmæːl el ɣeˈtˤɑːni]; 9 May 1945 – 18 October 2015) was an Egyptian author of historical and political novels and cultural and political commentaries and was the editor-in-chief of the literary periodical Akhbar Al-Adab ("Cultural News") till 2011.

== Life and works ==
Gamal al-Ghitani was born in Juhaynah, Sohag Governorate in Upper Egypt and moved with his family to Cairo as a child. He began writing at a young age and had his first short story published when he was only 14. He was originally trained to be a carpet designer and received his diploma in 1962. He continued to write on the side and was imprisoned from October 1966 through March 1967 for his critical commentary on the regime of Gamal Abd el-Nasser. In 1969 he switched careers and became a journalist for the Egyptian newspaper Akhbar El Yom ("The Day's News").

After becoming a journalist, al-Ghitani continued to write historical fiction, and many of his stories are set in Cairo. He also wrote about many cultural and political topics, notably the level of censorship in modern-day Egypt. In an effort to help promote the Arab literary culture, he helped found the literary magazine "Gallery 68".

In 1980, he was awarded with the Egyptian National Prize for Literature, and in 1987, the French Chevalier de l'Ordre des Arts et des Lettres. In 1985, he became editor-in-chief of Al Akhbar ("The News") and continued to be a contributing editor to Akhbar El-Yom's literary section. From 1993 to 2011, he was the editor-in-chief of Akhbar Al-Adab, one of Egypt's primary literary magazines. In 2005, he won a French Award for translated literature "Laure Bataillon", one of the highest French awards to be bestowed upon non-French writers. He was entitled for this award due to his giant work Khitāb al-tajalliyāt (The Book of Epiphanies). In 2009, he was awarded the Sheikh Zayed Book Award for Ren, the award is worth about $200,000 and is one of the world's richest literary awards.

Gamal al-Ghitani was married to the Egyptian journalist Magda El-Guindy, editor-in-chief of Al-Ahram's children's magazine "Alaaeddin". He has a son, Mohammad, and a daughter, Magda. He died on 18 October 2015 at the El Galaa Hospital For Armed Forces Officers Families in Cairo.

== Bibliography ==
- Awraq Shab ‘Asha mundhu Alf ‘Am, 1969
- Ard .. Ard, 1972.
- الزيني بركات [Al-Zaynī Barakāt] (1974). Zayni Barakat, trans. Farouk Abdel Wahab (Viking, 1988).
- Al-Hisar min Thalath Gihat, 1975.
- Hikayat el-Gharib, 1976.
- وقائع حارة الزعفراني [Waqāʾiʿ ḥārat al-Zaʿfarānī] (1976). Incidents in Zafrani Alley, trans. Peter O'Daniel (1986) and later by Farouk Abdel Wahab as The Zafarani Files (American University in Cairo Press, 2009).
- al-Rifai, 1977.
- Dhikr ma Jara, 1978.
- Khiṭaṭ al-Ghīṭānī (1980)
- كتاب التجليات [Khitāb al-tajalliyāt] (three volumes) (1983–1986). The Book of Epiphanies, partial trans. Farouk Abdel Wahab (American University in Cairo Press, 2012).
- Muntasaf Layl al-Ghurba, 1984.
- Ahrash al-Madina, 1985.
- Ithaf aI-Zaman bi-Hikayat Jalbi al-Sultan, 1985.
- Risala min al-Sababa wal Wagd, 1988.
- Ayam El Ro'ab (1988).
- Shath al-Madina, 1990.
- Risilat al-Basi'ir fi al-Masi'ir, 1989.
- Thimar al Waqt,1990.
- Asfar al-Asfar, 1992.
- Asfar al-Mushtaq, 1992.
- Ha-tif al-Maghib, 1992.
- Min Daftar al-'Ishq wal-Ghurba, 1993.
- Naftha Masdur, 1993.
- متون الأهرام [Mutun al-Ahram] (1994). Pyramid Texts, trans. Humphrey Davies (American University in Cairo Press, 2007).
- Shatf al-Nar, 1996.
- Hikayat Al Mo'asasa, 1997.
- نثار المحو [Nithar al-mahw] (2005). Traces: A Memoir, trans. Nader K. Uthman (American University in Cairo Press, 2020).
- Al Zowail, 2006
- نجيب محفوظ يتذكر [Al-majālis al-Maḥfūẓīyah] (2006). The Mahfouz Dialogs, trans. Humphrey Davies (American University in Cairo Press, 2007).
- Rinn, 2008
