= Sarah Enany =

Literary translator

Sarah Enany (Arabic: ساره عناني) is a literary translator and winner of the Banipal Prize for Literary Translation.

She has a PhD in drama and teaches at Cairo University.

She has translated works by Yusuf Idris, Mohamed Salmawy and Ahmed Aboul Gheit, but she is best known for her translation of the Galal trilogy by Kamal Ruhayyim. The first volume of the trilogy, Diary of a Jewish Muslim, was nominated for the Banipal Prize. Her translation of The Girl with Braided Hair by Rasha Adly won the Banipal Prize for Arabic Literary Translation in 2021.

She also authored the acclaimed Arabic translation of Les Misérables. In addition, she authored the Arabic translation of Mozart's and Schikaneder's Magic Flute, in collaboration with Neveen Allouba of Fabrica, performed at the Biblioteca Alexandrina in 2013: https://www.youtube.com/watch?v=7bsBsRvF-7o.
