= Radwa El Aswad =

Egyptian writer, novelist, and critic

- رضوى الأسود
- Born: January 20, 1974; Cairo
- Education: Ain Shams University
- Occupation: Writer And Novelist
- Writing career
- Language: Arabic
- Notable work: Bi-al-ams kuntu mayyitan : ḥikāyah ʻan al-Arman wa-al-Kurd بالأمس كنت ميتا : حكاية عن الأرمن والكرد
- Website: radwaaswad.com

Radwa Fadel El Aswad (Arabic: رضوى فاضل الأسود), born 1974, is an Egyptian writer, novelist, and critic.

== Early life and education ==
Radwa Fadel El Aswad, (Arabic: رضوى فاضل الأسود), was born in Egypt in the Zeitoun neighborhood of Cairo, on January 20, 1974, the eldest daughter of the critic, researcher, and scriptwriter Fadel El Aswad.

graduated from the Notre Dame Des Apôtres (Arabic: مدرسة راهبات نوتردام ديزابوتر للبنات) the French nun school, then obtained a Bachelor of Arts, French Department, from Ain Shams University in 1996.

== Career ==
She is an independent art and literary critic ، has published several articles about award-winning novels and books in Egyptian and Arabic newspapers and magazines.

== Notable work ==
Bi-al-ams kuntu mayyitan : ḥikāyah ʻan al-Arman wa-al-Kurd | Novel (Arabic: بالأمس كنت ميتا - حكاية عن الأرمن والكرد)

Published in 2020, by the Egyptian-Lebanese Publishing House, is a story about the Armenian Genocide, as well as History of the Kurds. The novel shows that politics corrupts the lives of peoples and religions, nominated for the Katara Prize for Arabic Novel

She is the author of two books and Six novels, one of which have been Featured in the ‘’Housaper’’ | the arevelk.am(Armenian: Յուսաբեր, IPA: [husɑˈpʰɛɾ, husɑˈbɛɾ]) is an Arabic daily newspaper, published in Cairo, Egypt, The novel known for its historical story that summarized the Armenian Genocide, as well as Kurdish history.

== Works ==
1. Hafl al-miʼawīyah | Novel (Arabic: حفل المئوية)، Bait El-yasmin for publishing, 2010
2. Tashābuk | Novel (Arabic: تشابك)، Dar alKitab al arabi for publishing, 2013
3. Kullu Hādhā Al-ṣakhkhab | Novel (Arabic: كل هذا الصخب)، Maqam for publishing, 2015
4. Adyān wa-ṭawāʼif majhūlah : jawhar ghāʼib wa-mafāhīm maghlūṭah | Book (Arabic: أديان وطوائف مجهولة - جوهر غائب ومفاهيم مغلوطة)، Battana for publishing, 2018
5. Zijzāj | Novel (Arabic: زجزاج)، Nahdet misr for publishing, 2018
6. Bi-al-ams kuntu mayyitan : ḥikāyah ʻan al-Arman wa-al-Kurd | Novel (Arabic: بالأمس كنت ميتا - حكاية عن الأرمن والكرد)، Egyptian-Lebanese Publishing House, 2020
7. Sayyid Quṭb : riḥlah bayna ḍifāf usṭūrat al-tanāquḍāt | Book (Arabic: سيد قطب - رحلة بين ضفاف أسطورة التناقضات)، Sama for publishing, 2022
8. Khedāā Wāhed Momken | Novel (Arabic: خداع واحد ممكن)، Dar Shorouq, 2022

== See also ==
- List of Egyptian authors
- List of Egyptian writers
