= List of The College of New Jersey alumni =

The College of New Jersey is a public university in Ewing Township, New Jersey. It was previously called Trenton State College and New Jersey State Normal School. Following are some of its notable alumni.

== Business ==
Name	Class	Major	Notability	References
Jeffrey Tessler	1975	Political science	CEO of Clearstream and former executive vice president of the Bank of New York	

== Clergy ==
Name	Class	Major	Notability	References
Geralyn Wolf	1971	M.A.	Bishop of the Episcopal Diocese of Rhode Island	

== Education ==
Name	Class	Major	Notability	References
Jean Broadhurst	1892		Botanist, bacteriologist, and professor at Teachers College, Columbia University	
Craige B. Champion	1984	BA	Historian, classical scholar, and professor of ancient history at Syracuse University	
Archibald Gamble		MA	Professor of oratory and English language at the University of Pennsylvania	
Robyn E. Hannigan		BS Biology	President of Ursinus College	
Karen Jobes	1974	Physics	Biblical scholar, Gerald F. Hawthorne professor emerita of New Testament Greek and Exegesis at Wheaton College	
Elizabeth Eckhardt May			Dean of the School of Home Economics at the University of Connecticut	
Monica McLemore		Nursing	Associate professor of Family Health Nursing at the University of California, San Francisco	
David L. Richards			Political scientist and professor; co-founder of the CIRI Human Rights Data Project	
Richard A. Swanson			Organizational theorist and professor	
Adella Wotherspoon		Education	Teacher; youngest and last living survivor of the General Slocum ship disaster	

== Entertainment ==
Name	Class	Major	Notability	References
Jay Black			Stand-up comic and screenwriter	
Jake Burbage		English	Actor, writer, director, and musician	
Sheila Callaghan			Award-winning playwright and screenwriter	
Stephen Dadaian			Electric and classical guitarist	
Tony DeNicola		BS, MS	Jazz drummer	
Jeff Feuerzeig			Film director and screenwriter best known for The Devil and Daniel Johnston	
William Goldstein			Composer, recording artist, and improvisational pianist	
Tom Kraeutler			Home improvement broadcast journalist and author	
Kenny and Keith Lucas			Academy Award-nominated writers and producers, best known for Judas and the Black Messiah	
Adam Mamawala			Stand-up comic	
Jessielyn Palumbo			Beauty photographer and Miss New Jersey USA	
Jane Remover		Engineering	Musician; attended for one semester	
Tom Scharpling			Producer and radio host	
Richard Sterban			Member of The Oak Ridge Boys	
Ty Treadway			One Life to Live soap star and host of Soap Talk on Soapnet cable channel	
Julianna White			Miss New Jersey USA 2011	

== Law ==
Name	Class	Major	Notability	References
Georgette Castner	2002	BS	United States district judge of the United States District Court for the United States District Court for the District of New Jersey from 2022	
Jacqueline C. Romero	1993	BA	United States attorney for the Eastern District of Pennsylvania	

== Politics ==
Name	Class	Major	Notability	References
Lori Alhadeff			Member of the Broward County School Board and founder of school-safety organization Make Our Schools Safe	
Christopher J. Brown			New Jersey General Assembly	
MacDella Cooper		Electronic communications	Leader of the Movement for One Liberia political party	
Mary-Kate Fisher		International Studies	Acting chief of Protocol of the United States	
James Florio	1962	BA	Governor of New Jersey	
Bill Flynn			New Jersey General Assembly and mayor of Old Bridge Township, New Jersey	
Joe Howarth		BS	New Jersey General Assembly	
Enoch L. "Nucky" Johnson			Atlantic County treasurer and sheriff, mobster, and political boss of Atlantic City	
Dick LaRossa			New Jersey Senate 1994–2000	
Gerald Luongo		B.A., M.A.	New Jersey General Assembly	
Gloanna W. MacCarthy			New Jersey General Assembly	
Joseph R. Malone			New Jersey General Assembly 1993–2012	
Gabriela Mosquera		Political Science	New Jersey General Assembly	
Joseph A. Mussomeli	1975	BA	U.S. ambassador to Slovenia, U.S. ambassador to Cambodia, and U.S. ambassador to the Philippines	
Verlina Reynolds-Jackson		Sociology	New Jersey General Assembly	
Jorge A. Rod			New Jersey General Assembly	
Donna Scheuren	1991	Business administration	Pennsylvania House of Representatives	
Erik K. Simonsen			New Jersey General Assembly and mayor of Lower Township	
Balvir Singh			Board of County Commissioners for Burlington County, New Jersey	
Christopher Smith	1975	BA	United States House of Representatives	
William A. Stevens			President of the New Jersey Senate; New Jersey attorney general	
Shirley Turner		Education	New Jersey State Senate and New Jersey General Assembly	
Daniel Van Pelt		Criminal justice	New Jersey General Assembly	
Connie Wagner			New Jersey General Assembly 2008–2013	
Madaline A. Williams			First African American woman elected to the New Jersey General Assembly	

== Sports ==
Name	Class	Major	Notability	References
Melanie Balcomb			Head women's basketball coach at Vanderbilt University	
John Beake	1961		General manager of the Denver Broncos of the National Football League 1985–1998	
Davy Bisslik		Computer science	Olympic swimmer from Aruba	
Terry Bradway			General manager of the New York Jets 2001–2006	
Orlando Cáceres			Wrestler who competed for Puerto Rico in the men's freestyle 57 kg at the 1984 Summer Olympics	
Carmen Cincotti		Biomechanical engineering	Competitive eater and holder of multiple records in Major League Eating	
Tristan H. Cockcroft			Writer for ESPN.com and co-host of the ESPN Fantasy Focus Baseball podcast	
Greg Grant			Former professional basketball player	
Eric Hamilton			Football coach	
Don Harnum			College basketball coach and athletics administrator	
Gene Hart	1952	BA	Hockey Hall of Fame broadcaster and former play-by-play voice of the Philadelphia Flyers	
Hillary Klimowicz			Professional basketball player	
Tom McCarthy	1990		Radio play-by-play voice of the Philadelphia Phillies	
Chickie Geraci Poisson			Field hockey player and coach	
Kathy Mueller Rohan			Professional tennis player	

== Writing and journalism ==
Name	Class	Major	Notability	References
Oscar Fay Adams			Editor and author	
Holly Black			Author of The Spiderwick Chronicles series	
Trudy Krisher			Author	
Geraldine Clinton Little			Poet	
John Stryker Meyer	non-degreed		Nonfiction author and U.S. Army Special Forces combat veteran	
Hooda Shawa Qaddumi		BA economics and political science; MEd	Author of children's and young adult books, winner of the Sheikh Zayed Book Award	
