= Arabic Literary Thought: Structures and Systems =

- Author: Said Yaktine
- Original title: الفكر الأدبي العربي: البنيات والأنساق
- Language: Arabic
- Subject: Literary criticism, Narratology, Arabic literature
- Genre: Non-fiction, Academic
- Publisher: Difaf Publications (Beirut) - Dar al-Aman (Rabat) - Al-Ikhtilaf (Algiers)
- Publication date: 2014 (First Edition)
- Publication place: Morocco
- Pages: 360
- ISBN: 978-614-02-1165-0
- Preceded by: Morocco: A Future Without Politics
- Followed by: Language, Culture, Knowledge: Problems and Stakes

Arabic Literary Thought: Structures and Systems (Arabic:الفكر الأدبي العربي: البنيات والأنساق) is a seminal work of literary criticism and theoretical analysis by the prominent Moroccan scholar and critic Said Yaktine. Published in 2014 through a joint collaboration between Difaf Publications (Beirut), Dar al-Aman (Rabat), and Al-Ikhtilaf (Algiers), the book represents a significant contribution to the field of contemporary Arabic critical discourse.

The work was awarded the prestigious Sheikh Zayed Book Award in 2016 in the Arts and Critical Studies category. In this book, Yaktine provides an integrated theoretical and applied vision of the concept of literary thought, bridging the gap between Western methodologies and the specificities of the Arab world.

== Background and Context ==
Said Yaktine is widely regarded as one of the leading figures in modern Arabic narratology and structuralist criticism. His work often focuses on the transition from traditional impressionistic criticism to a more rigorous, scientific study of literature. Arabic Literary Thought serves as a culmination of his efforts to redefine how Arabic literature is studied, moving away from purely aesthetic or historical evaluations toward a structural and systemic understanding.

The book addresses the epistemological rupture between traditional Arabic criticism and modern Western theories. Yaktine argues that while the Arab world has imported many Western critical terms, it has often failed to adopt the underlying literary thought or the scientific rigor that accompanies these theories. The poet and critic Mazen Aktham Suleiman noted that the book treats old and new issues in a distinct manner, signaling a new phase in Arabic literary consciousness.

== Structure and Content ==
The book spans 360 pages and is organized into a general introduction, specific introductions for each section, and 13 chapters divided into three main parts:

=== Part I: Western Literary Thought: Formations and Processes ===
In this section, Yaktine traces the evolution of Western literary studies from the 19th century to the present. He identifies three major eras characterized by three central concepts:

- Themes: The focus on content and subject.
- Structures: The rise of structuralism and the focus on the internal mechanics of the text.
- Systems: The contemporary focus on how texts function within broader cultural and social networks.

Yaktine posits that scientific thinking in literature only truly began to manifest during the structuralist phase, which allowed for a more objective analysis of literary phenomena.

=== Part II: On the Arabic Critical Vision ===
This section examines the history of modern Arabic criticism through key figures and movements. Yaktine analyzes:

- The concepts of literature and history in the works of Jurji Zaydan and Mostafa Saadeq Al-Rafe'ie.
- The transition from the concept of literature to the concept of criticism, focusing on Taha Hussein and the institutionalization of critical tradition.
- The ambiguous relationship between the literary text and the applied methodology in Arabic scholarship.
- The interaction between modern Arabic literary criticism and the Other (Western theory).

=== Part III: On Arabic Critical Practice ===
The final section focuses on the application of these theories to Arabic texts. It covers:

- The shift from the criticism of poetry to the analysis of poetic discourse.
- Reading the Arabic narrative heritage (prose and folk epics).
- The dynamics of the text and the dynamics of reading.
- The concept of the text and strategies of reading.
- Cultural criticism and the cultural system.

== Core Thesis ==
The central argument of the book is that the production of literary knowledge in the Arab world is dependent on shifting literary research from the realm of impressionistic criticism (whether literary or cultural) to the realm of science. Yaktine advocates for literature to become a specialized discipline capable of interacting with other sciences, thereby contributing to the development of scientific thought in the Arab world.

Yaktine identifies three archetypes in the history of Arabic literary study:

1. The Academic Writer: Who approaches literature with a creative or emotional bias.
2. The Intellectual: Who uses literature as a tool for social or political commentary.
3. The Academic-Scientist (Scholar of Literature): Who treats literature as an object of scientific inquiry.

He argues that Arabic literary criticism cannot evolve without being grounded in a literary thought that synthesizes literary science and critical practice.

== Reception ==
The book was highly praised for its methodological rigor and its ability to synthesize complex Western theories within an Arabic context. The Sheikh Zayed Book Award committee noted that the work is characterized by a high level of specialized knowledge and a clear methodology in analyzing the structures of Arabic literary thought. Critics have lauded Yaktine for his ability to move beyond the imitation of Western theories, instead engaging in a critical dialogue that seeks to establish an indigenous yet modern Arabic literary science.
