= Mohamed Ait Mihoub =

Tunisian writer and scholar

- Born: 15 October 1968 (age 58); Bizerte, Tunisia
- Education: PhD in Arabic Language and Literature
- Alma mater: University of Manouba
- Years active: 1993–present
- Awards: Won the Translation Award of Sheikh Zayed Book Award, 2020

Mohamed Ait Mihoub, (Arabic: محمد آيت ميهوب) a Tunisian writer, translator, and professor, was born in 1968. He published many books including “Roses and Ash” and “The Romantic Man” which was a translation of Georges Gusdorf’s book “L’homme Romantique”. He won several awards including the Translation Award of Sheikh Zayed Book Award in 2020.

== Education and career ==
Mohamed Ait Mihoub was born in Bizerte city, Tunisia on 15 October 1968. He has a bachelor's degree in Arabic language and Literature in 1991 from the University of Manouba. In 1999, he earned his master's degree, then a PhD in 2007 from the Faculty of Arts and Humanities of Manouba. From 2008 to 2019, he worked in Arabic Department in College of Human and Social Sciences of Tunis. Currently, Mihoub works at Zayed University as an assistant professor of Arabic language and literature. Mihoub has been a member of: the Tunisian Writers Union since 1992, “Narratology” research group at the College of Arts and Humanities of Manouba, and the higher committee of Tunisian Bank's literary award. Also, he has been the president of the Judgment Committee of the competition of the Abdul Hameed Shoman Foundation's for youth literature in Jordan, and the novel competition by Comar foundation Committee of the Tunisian International Book Fair's Award. He is the director of "Mustapha Azzouz", the international symposium for the child literature, Tunis. Mihoub has been the supervised committee of the commemoration of the centenary of "Mahmoud Messadi" which was organized by the Ministry of Culture of Tunisia and the organizing committee of the festival of Modern Tunisian poetry in Bizerta, Tunis. In addition, he produced some literary programs on the cultural radio of Tunisia including "the other text", "Tunisian tales", and "this is how the narrator talks". Mihoub has won several awards including the first literary Prized awarded by the Ministry of Culture for his book "Roses and Ash" in 1994. In 2000, he won the same prize for his novel "Sand Letters". He won the Mustapha Azzouz Award for Children's Literature in its 2014–2015 session for his book "A Broken Bird Flying in the Sky". In 2020, he won Translation Award of Sheikh Zayed Book Award in 2020 for his book "The Romantic Man".

== Works ==
=== Short-story collections ===
- "Roses and Ash" (original title: Wurood wa Ramad), 1993

=== Novels ===
- “The Letters of Sand” (original title: Huruf al-Raml), 1994

=== Academic books ===
- “The Autobiographical Novel in the Arabic Literature” (original title: al-Riwaya al-seerthatia fi al-adab al-arabi al-moaasr), 2016
- “The Intergenic Interference in the Contemporary Arabic Literature” (original title: al-Tadakhul al-ajnasi fi al-Adab al-Arabi al-moaasr), 2019

=== Translated books ===
From French into Arabic:

- Mister L by Azza Filali, 2008
- Glory of Sand by Mustapha Tlili, 2010
- End of Game by Samuel Beckett, 2011
- Short story by Thierry Ozwald, 2014
- Broken Bird Flying in the Sky, 2015
- Nights of the Nights or The King of the Hanged by Mansour M’henni, 2017
- The Romantic Man by George Gusdorf, 2018

== Awards ==
- 1994: won the 1st Literary Prize awarded by the Ministry of Culture for his book "Roses and Ash".
- 2000: won the Literary Prize of the Ministry of Culture for his book "Sand Letters".
- 2015: won the Mustapha Azzouz Award for Children's Literature for his book "Broken Bird Flying in the Sky".
- 2020: won the Translation Award of Sheikh Zayed Book Award in 2020 for his book "The Romantic Man".

== See also ==
- Hussien Al Mutawaa
- Abderrazak Belagrouz
- Abdallah Al Busais
