= Rabah Khedouci =

Algerian writer and novelist

- Born: 16 December 1955 (age 70); Beni Misra, Algeria
- Education: Institute National De Formation Et De Perfictionnment Du Personnel De L’education
- Occupations: Writer and novelist
- Writing career
- Language: Arabic
- Notable work: Alghoraba'a

Rabah Khedouci (Arabic: رابح خدوسي) is an Algerian writer and novelist. He has two novels and many story series for children. In 1990, his novel Alghoraba’a won the national prize "Iqbal".

== Biography ==
Rabah Khedouci was born in 1995 in Beni Misra, Algeria. He completed his education in Institute National De Formation Et De Perfictionnment Du Personnel De L'education. Between 1974 and 1997, he worked as a teacher and an education inspector. He is the founder of ‘Dar Alhadara’, a publishing house established in 1992. Also, he is the founder of ‘Almoa’alm’, an educational and cultural magazine that was started in 2000. Khedouci has two novels Addahya and Alghoraba’a which has won the national prize "Iqbal". His name emerged as one of the interested in children's literature as he published several story series including "A’alam Alfokaha", "Qisasi Aldjamila", and others.

== Works ==
=== Novels ===
The Victim (original title: Addahia), 1984

The Strangers (original title: Al-ghuraba’a), 1990

=== Short stories ===
- The Burning of the Birds (original title: Ihtiraq Ala’assafir), 1988
- The Smart Child (original title: Attifl Addaki), 1995
- The Park of the Wolves (original title: Hadiqat Addia’ab), 2007
- The Bread Seller (original title: Ba’aiat Alkhobz), 2007
- The Car Ti Ti (original title: Assyara Ti Ti), 2007
- Magtaa Kheira, 2007
- Impressions of Man Returned from Cities of Beauty (original title: Intiba’at A’aid mun Mudun Aldjamal), 2009
- Faces and Phenomenon (original title: Woujoh wa Dhawahir), 2014

==== Story series ====
- My beautiful Stories (original title: Qissi Aldjamila)
- The World of Humour (original title: A’alam Alfokaha), 1994
- Figures of Algeria (original title: A’alam Aldjazaee’r), 1997
- Literature of Young-manliness (original title: Adb Alfutuwa), 2007

== Awards ==
He has won several local awards including:

- The National Prize ‘Iqbal’ for his novel Alghouraba’a,1990
- The Great Award ‘Ibda’a’ for children stories, 1992
- The Ministry of Culture Award for writing for children, 1998

== See also ==
- Abdelhamid ben Hadouga
- Abderrazak Belagrouz
