= Ali Ashour Al-Jaffar =

Kuwaiti writer and academic

- Born: 15 December 1963 (age 62)
- Occupations: Academic, writer

Ali Ashour Al-Jaffar (Arabic: علي عاشور الجعفر) is a writer and academic of Kuwaiti citizenship, who teaches at the College of Education at Kuwait University.

== Life ==
Ali Ashour Al-Jaffar was born on 15 December 1963 in Kuwait. He obtained a bachelor's degree in Arabic Language Teaching Methods at the College of Education at Kuwait University in 1987, and a master's in Education at the Primary Level at Indiana University Bloomington in the United States of America in 1995, and a Doctor of Philosophy from the same university in 1998.

== Career ==
- Instructor at Kuwait University from 1998 to May 2006
- Director of the Centre for Practical Education at the College of Education "Kuwait University" from 2004 to 2006
- Director of the Master's Program in the Curriculum Department from 2010 to 2011
- Professor, Department of Curricula and Teaching Methods, College of Education, Kuwait University, from 2006 to present

He is the editor-in-chief of Journal of Children, and owner of the “storypedia” website, which publishes the summaries of children's stories in the Arab world.

== Books ==
Ashour published three collections of short stories for children by Dar Al Hadaek: My Sister Sees by Smell, The Square Story, and We Make a House of Dust. His latest publication, in 2020, is entitled The Beautiful Surprised Object: A Reading in Children's Poetic Fiction. He has three translations of books issued by The Children of Reggio.

Book	Number of pages	Year	Publisher	Language	International number	Source
My sister sees by smell (Arabic: 'ukhti turaa bialraayiha)	24	January 1, 2013	Dar Al Hadaek	Arabic	139789953464923	
Children's Theater in Kuwait: Between semantic diversity, heritage and directing (Arabic: masrah altifl fi alkuayt "bayn altanawue aldalalii walturath wal'ukhraji")	647	January 1, 2007	Dar Al-Wafaa for printing and publishing	Arabic		
We make a house of dust (Arabic: nasnae bytaan min alghubar)	52	December 23, 2019	Dar Al Hadaek	Arabic	9786144391747	

== Awards ==
Ali Ashour Al-Jafar won the award for the best doctoral thesis at the level of the Curriculum Department at the College of Education, Indiana University - Bloomington, United States in 1998. He also won the State Prize in 2016 in the field of education for the book Children’s Literature and Politics: Diversity and Difference.
