= Hussain Al Mutawaa =

Kuwaiti writer and poet

- Born: 1989 (age 36–37); Kuwait
- Education: BA in Arabic Language Literature and Criticism
- Alma mater: University of Kuwait
- Occupation: Writer
- Writing career
- Language: Arabic
- Years active: 2009–present
- Genres: Fiction, Short Story
- Notable work: I Dream of Being a Cement Mixer
- Notable awards: Won the Sheikh Zayed Book Award for the Category Children's Literature, 2019

Hussain Al Mutawaa (Arabic: حسين المطوع) is a Kuwaiti writer, poet, literary critic and a photographer who was born in 1989. He published two novels and two short stories. In 2019, his short story "I Dream of Being a Cement Mixer" won Sheikh Zayed Book Award for Child Literature and which was translated into English, French, Ukrainian and Italian. Before turning to stories and novels, Al Mutawaa started his literary career in literature as a poet in 2009.

== Education and career ==
Hussain Al Mutawaa was born on 19 June 1989. He has a bachelor's degree in Literature and Criticism from the Arabic Language College with a Minor in philosophy from University of Kuwait. Al Mutawaa started his career in literature as a poet in 2009 which he participated in many poetry events and festivals and won the first place in the "University Poet and Storyteller" category at University of Kuwait. In 2015, he turned from poetry to stories and then to novels. He published his first novel, Sand, in 2017. Then, in 2018, he published the short story "I Dream of Being a Cement Mixer", which won the Sheikh Zayed Book Award in 2019 for the category Children's Literature and was translated into many languages including English, French, and Italian. Al Mutawaa has participated in many event and festivals such as the Emirates Airline Festival of Literature, Abu Dhabi International Book Fair, and Frankfurt Book Fair.

== Novels ==
- Sand (Original title: Turab), 2017
- Alf Layla w Layla Agendat Takween

== Short stories ==
- "I Dream Being a Cement Mixer" (Original title: Ahlum An Akun Khalat Ismant), 2018
- "Deeper into my heart" (Original title: Amekan Nahwa Kalbi), 2020

== See also ==
- Abderrazak Belagrouz
- Abdallah Al Busais
- Mohamed Ait Mihoub
