= Baqer Al-Najjar =

Bahraini sociology professor (born 1953)

- باقر النجار
- Born: Baqir Salman Al-Najjar; 1953 (age 72–73)
- Education: Kuwait University, Alexandria University, Durham University
- Occupations: sociologist, politician, columnist, author
- Years active: 1984–Present
- Employer: University of Bahrain
- Notable work: الديمقراطية العصية في الخليج العربي ("Reluctant Democracy in the Persian Gulf")

Baqer Salman Al-Najjer (Arabic: باقر سلمان النجار, born 1953) is a Bahraini sociology professor, politician, author, and columnist. He serves as chairman of the Board of Trustees of the Arab Sociological Association.

== Early life and education ==
Al-Najjar was born in 1953. He obtained a Bachelor of Arts from Kuwait University in 1976. His postgraduate diploma was from Alexandria University. In 1983, he earned his Doctor of Philosophy in Sociology from Durham University.

== Career ==
Al-Najjar worked as a research coordinator in Kuwait for the Joint Program Production Corporation of the Gulf Cooperation Council. He has been a professor of sociology at the University of Bahrain since 1984, once headed the Department of Social Sciences, and served as Dean of the College of Arts there from 1995 to 1999. He was a visiting fellow at the Harvard University Center for Middle Eastern Studies in 2015 and a visiting professor at the University of Exeter from 2002 to 2003. He is a member of a number of Bahraini, Arab, and worldwide scientific and civil organizations, most notably the Middle East Studies Association of North America and the Arab Council for Childhood and Development. Considered among the most prominent and prolific Gulf researchers in sociology, he is also a columnist for the newspapers Asharq Al-Awsat and Al Bilad.

== Political career ==
From 2000 to 2002, Al-Najjar served in an appointed role on Bahrain's Consultative Council, the upper house of Parliament.

== Controversy ==
Al-Najjar sparked controversy when he wrote the following in the book الحداثة الممتنعة في الخليج العربي ("Reluctant Modernity in the Persian Gulf") that:

The Shiites are a sectarian minority in the Gulf...In Bahrain, estimates vary around 50%, but because of the naturalization process that Bahraini society has undergone during the past two decades, it does not exceed 50%, and some unofficial estimates indicate that their percentage has decreased to less than 47% of the total population.

However, opposition figure Abbas Bu Safwan considers the figure to be more than 60%.

== Personal life ==
Al-Najjar is married with three sons, one of whom is named Salman.

== Awards ==
In 2009, he won the Sheikh Zayed Book Award for Best Book in the Field of Development and State Building, in the third edition of the awards, for الحداثة الممتنعة في الخليج العربي.

== Publications ==
- العمل الاجتماعي التطوعي في الخليج العربي ("Volunteer Social Work in the Persian Gulf")
- إنتاجية العمل في القطاع الصناعي في البحرين ("Labor Productivity in the Industrial Sector in Bahrain")
- سوسيولوجيا المجتمع في الخليج العربي ("Sociology of Persian Gulf Society")
- المرأة وتحولات الحداثة العسيرة ("Women and the Difficult Transformations of Modernity")
- حلم الهجرة للثروة: الهجرة والعمالة المهاجرة في الخليج العربي ("Migration Dreams of Wealth: Migration and Migrant Labor in the Persian Gulf")
- الحركات الدينية في الخليج العربي ("Religious Movements in the Persian Gulf")
- الحداثة الممتنعة في الخليج العربي ("Reluctant Modernity in the Persian Gulf")
