= Maisoon Saqer =

Emirati writer and artist

- Born: 1958 (age 67–68); Sharjah, United Arab Emirates
- Education: BA in Economics and Political Sciences
- Alma mater: University of Cairo
- Occupations: poet, artist
- Years active: 1983–present

Maisoon Saqer (Arabic: ميسون صقر; born 1958) is a female Emirati poet and artist who was born in Sharjah, UAE in 1958. She published many poetry collections including "This Is How I Name Things". She held numerous Art exhibitions in various countries including UAE, Cairo, Jordan and Bahrain. She published her first novel "Raihana" in 2003.

== Education and career ==
Maisoon Saqer, a poet and artisit, was born on 1958 in Sharjah, the United Arab Emirates. In 1981, she graduated from the University of Cairo and earned her master's degree in economics and political science. She worked as the Director of the Cultural Department Ministry of Information and Culture, UAE from 1980 till 1995. In 1983, her first poetry collection "This Is How I Name Things". Whereas, her first novel "Raihana" was published in 2003. She held Art exhibitions in various countries including Cairo, UAE, Jordan and Bahrain. In 1990, she held her first art exhibition in her homeland, UAE. Saqer has also presented an experimental film entitled "A Thread Behind A Thread" which won the Jury Prize for Emirates Films in Abu Dhabi. The film was also presented at the Cairo Cultural Center and Ismailia International Festival for Documentary and Short Films. In 2009, Saqer published a book which consisted of all her father's "Saqr bin Salman Al Qasimi" poetry collections which she worked on for 10 years. Her second novel "In My Mouth, A Pearl" was short listed for the Sheikh Zayed Book Award in 2017.

== Works ==
Some of her poetry collections include:

- “This Is How I Name Things” (original title: Hakatha Osami Al Ashiaa), 1983
- “An Insane Man Doesn’t Love Me” (original title: Rajul Majnoon La Yohibuni), 2001
- “Flow in a body matter” (original title: Jarayan fi Madat al Jasad)
- “Bandit’s Widow” (original title: Armalat Qatee al-Tareq)
- “The Home” (original title: Al Bayet)
- “Another Place” (original title: Makan Akhar)

=== Novels ===
- Raihana, 2003
- "In My Mouth, A Pearl" (original title: fi fami Lulu'a), 2016
