= Naji Al 'Awnali =

Tunisian translator and researcher

- Born: 1968 (age 57–58); Tunisia
- Education: PhD in Philosophy
- Occupation: German Philosophy professor at University of Sfax
- Writing career
- Language: Arabic French, German, Greek
- Genres: Translator and Researcher
- Notable awards: Sheikh Zayed Book Award 2018

Naji Al 'Awnali (Arabic: ناجي العونلي) is a Tunisian translator and researcher who specializes in philosophy. He was born in 1968. He currently teaches Modern and Contemporary Philosophy at Tunis University. He speaks four languages in addition to Arabic. He translated a number of philosophical texts from German and French, he also received the Sheikh Zayed Book Award for ‘Translation’ in 2018.

== Education ==
- He obtained a PhD in Philosophy in 1997.
- He obtained a University Qualification Certificate in German Idealism.

== Occupation ==
He teaches Modern and Contemporary German Philosophy at the University of Sfax.

== Publications ==
=== Original works ===
- Hegel The First in Context or (Hegel al-Awwal fi Siyaqih) published by Jadawel Publishing House in 2012.

=== Translations ===
- Hegel’s ‘Phenomenology of Spirit’ or (Phenomenologia Al-Rūḥ) published by The Arab Organization for Translation in 2006.
- Hegel’s ‘The Difference Between Fichte's and Schelling's System of Philosophy’ or (Fi Al Farq Bayn Nasq Fichte Wa Nasq Schelling Fi Al Falsafa) published by Centre for Arab Unity Studies in 2007.
- Immanuel Kant’s ‘Critique of Practical Reason’ or (Naqd Al ʿAql Al ʿAmali) published by Jadawil Publishing House in 2011.
- Theodor W. Adorno’s ‘Minima Moralia: Reflections from Damaged Life’ or (Al-Adab Al Ṣagheer: Afkar Multaqaṭa Min Al Ḥaya Al Mushawaha) published by Sharq Gharb Publishing House in 2011.
- German Idealism [co-authored with Abu Yaʿorub Al-Marzooqi and Fatḥi Al-Miskeeni] published by Arab Network for Research and Publishing in 2012.
- Walter Benjamin’s ‘One-way street’ or (Shareʿ Thu Etejah Waḥid) published by Sharq Gharb Publishing House in 2012.
- Hegel’s ‘Lectures on Aesthetics’ or (Duroos Fil Asteeqa) published by Al-Jamal Publishing in 2014.
- Max Horkheimer’s ‘Critical Theory’ or (Al-Nathariya Al Taqlidiya Wal Nathariya Al Naqdiya) published by Al-Jamal Publishing in 2014.
- ‘Extracted Parts from Jacques Derrida’s books’ or (Fusool Muntazaʿa) [co-authored with Abdulaziz Al-ʿEyadi and Maʿaz Al-Madyooni] published by Al-Jamal Publishing in 2015.
- Theodor W. Adorno’s ‘Aesthetic Theory’ or (Nathariya Asteeqiya ) published by Al-Jamal Publishing in 2017.
- Roland Barthes’ ‘Roland Barthes’ or (Roland Barthes Bi Qalam Roland Barthes) published by Al-Jamal Publishing in 2017.
- Hegel’s ‘Faith & knowledge’ or (Al-Eman Wa Al- Maʿarifa).
- Alain Badiou’s ‘Deleuze: The Clamor of Being’ or (Deleuze: Ṣakhab Al-Kaynouna) published by Al-Jamal Publishing in 2018.
- Hans Belting’s ‘The End of the History of Art’ or (Nehayit Tareekh Al-Fan) [co-authored with Idris Al-Shawk].
- Peter Sloterdijk’s ‘Critique of Cynical Reason’ or (Naqd Al-ʿAql Al-Kalbi) published by Al-Jamal Publishing in 2020.

== Awards ==
- He received the Présidence Tunisie Award in Professorship in 1991.
- He received the Sheikh Zayed Book Award in ‘Translation’ during its twelfth round 2017-2018 for his translation of Theodor W. Adorno’s ‘Aesthetic Theory’ or (Nathariya Asteeqiya ).
