= Osama Alaysa =

Palestinian writer and journalist

- Born: 20 December 1968 (age 57); Palestine
- Occupations: Writer, journalist
- Years active: 1984–present
- Awards: Sheikh Zayed Book Award for his novel "Fools of Bethlehem", 2015

Osama Alaysa (Arabic:أسامة العيسة), a Palestinian writer and journalist, was born in 1963. He worked in several regional and Arab newspaper; and published more than 10 books including the novel "The Fools of Bethlehem" which was awarded the Sheikh Zayed Book Award in 2015.

== Biography ==
Osama Alaysa, a Palestinian writer and journalist, was born on 20 December in 1963 in Bethlehem, Palestine. He moved to Jordan in 1987. Alaysa worked for numerous regional and Arab newspaper including "Ashraq Al-Awsat", 'Al Akhbar", and "Kul al-Arab"; and conducted research for documentaries about the culture of politics of the Palestinians. Alaysa was arrested many times in various Israeli prisons, the first time was when he was 13 years old. He worked as the managing editor of the weekly newspaper "Al-Sada". Also, he is a member of the Palestinian Journalist Syndicate and a member of the Palestinian Writers Union. He has published four novels, four collections of short story and number books. In 1984, he published his first short story collection "We, the Poor, Are Still the Most Capable of Loving People". He won several awards including the Sheikh Zayed Book Award for his novel "The Fools of Bethlehem".

== Works ==
=== Novels ===
- "Al Maskobiya", 2010
- "Fools of Bethlehem" (original title: Majaneen Beit Lahem), 2013
- “The Last Kiss of Bethlehem” (original title: Qublat Beit Lahem Al Akhera), 2016
- “The Jericho Rose” (original title: Warda Areeha), 2017
- “The Cat of Beer Al Sab" (original title: Qeet Beer Al Sab’), 2017
- “A Bridge Over the Jordan River” (original title: Jesr alaa Nahr Al Urdun), 2018

=== Short story collections ===
- “We, the Poor, Are Still the Most Capable of Loving People” (original title: Mazeelna Nahnu Al Fukaraa Aqdar Al Nas Ala Al Ashq), 1984
- “Al Hanoon Al Jabali”, 1985
- “Anthropods of Longing and Distress” (original title: Anthialat Al Haneen wa Al Asaa), 2004
- “The Messenger of God to the Beloved” (original title: Rasool al Elah ela Al Habeba), 2017

=== Books ===
- “The Blood that Will Not Be Lost: The Story of The Assassination of the Leaders of Al-Aqsa Intifada” (original title: Dimaa Lan Tadee “Kisat Egthialat Qadat Intifada al-Aqsa), 2000
- “Tel Aviv Does Not Forget – The Story of the Assassinations of the Leaders of the Al-Aqsa Intifada” (original title: Till Abib La Ta’reef Al Nesian – Kisat Eghtialat Qadat Intifada Al Aqsa), 2001
- “The Road to Emmanuel” (original title: Al Tareeq ela Ammanuel), 2003
- “The Scrolls of the Dead Sea” (original title: Makhtoutat al-Bahr al-Maiet), 2003
- “His Shadow On the Ground; Titles of Muslim Rules in Raqum Jerusalem” (original title: delah alaa al Arth; Alqab Hukaam Muslimeen fi Ruqum Maqdasia), 2004

== Awards ==
- 2008: He was awarded a merit award in the Award of the Return of Oral History for his research "Tales from the Jerusalem's Barrows".
- 2011: He won the Palestine Award for Journalism and Information.
- 2013: He won the Arab Prize for Creativity for his novel "Al Maskobiya".
- 2015: His novel 'Fools of Bethlehem" won the Sheikh Zayed Book Award.
