= Academy and College of Philadelphia =

1749–1791 school in Pennsylvania

Coordinates: 39.951°N 75.195°W

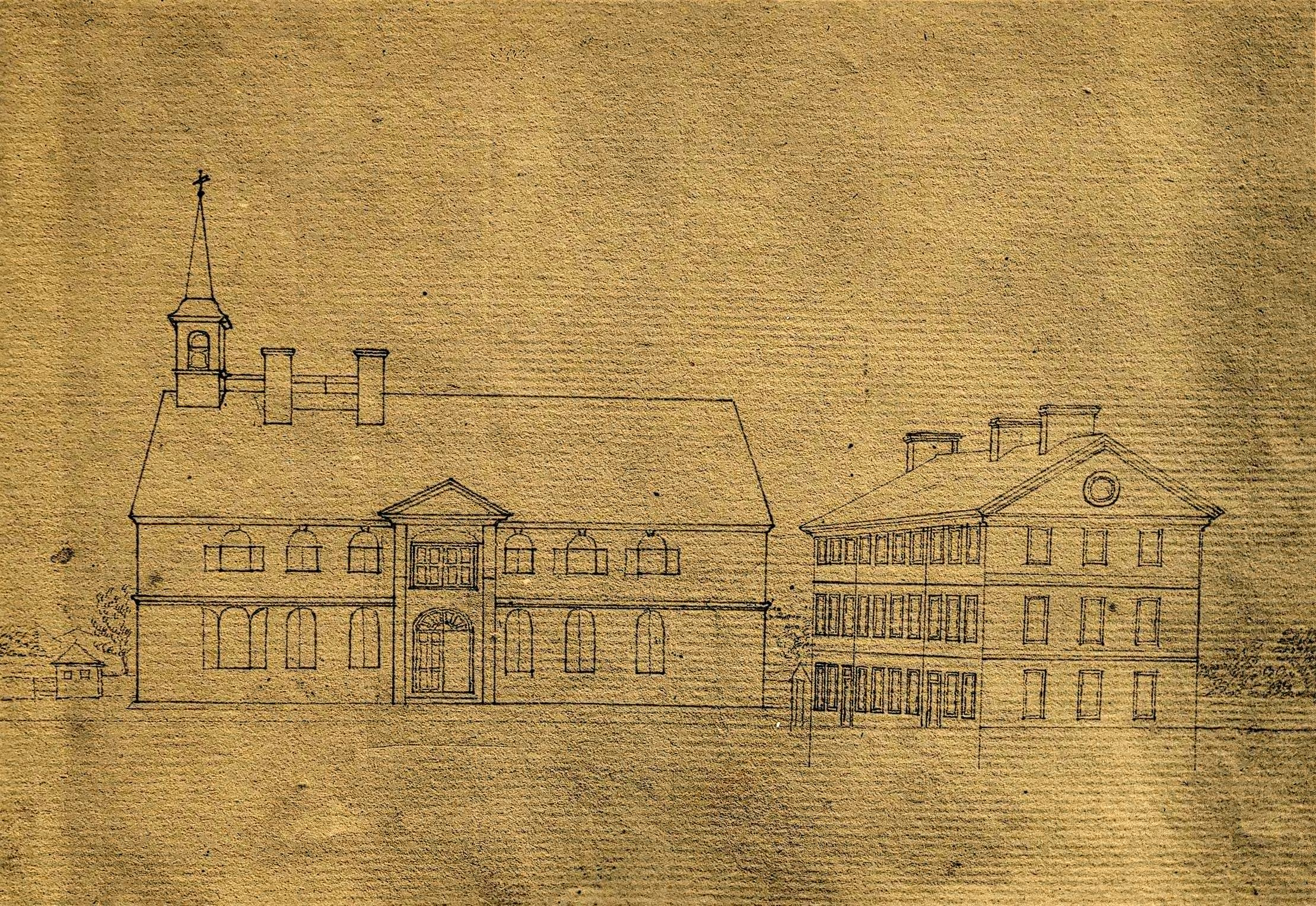
Academy and College of Philadelphia, a c. 1780 sketch by Pierre Eugene du Simitiere when the new building (left) was erected in 1740; the dormitory (right) was erected 25 years later, in 1765.

The Academy and College of Philadelphia (1749–1791) was a boys' school and men's college in Philadelphia in the colonial-era Province of Pennsylvania. The college evolved into the University of Pennsylvania.

Founded in 1749 by a group of local notables that included Benjamin Franklin, the Academy of Philadelphia began as a private secondary school, occupying a former religious school building at the southwest corner of 4th and Arch Streets. The academy taught reading, writing, and arithmetic to both paying and charity students. The College of Philadelphia was founded in 1755, when the academy's charter was amended to allow the granting of advanced academic degrees. The Medical School of the College of Philadelphia, founded in 1765, was the first medical school in North America.

In 1791, the College of Philadelphia merged with the University of the State of Pennsylvania, to form the present-day University of Pennsylvania.

== History ==
Benjamin Franklin was the first president of the board of trustees and authored the constitution for the academy, which was notable for its emphasis on modern languages and science in place of Latin and Greek. The academy opened for the secondary schooling of boys on August 13, 1751, with a charity school opening shortly afterwards.

The building that housed the academy had originally been set up in 1740 as a charity school supporting the ministry of George Whitefield with a hall for him to preach in, although Franklin, who had a hand in it, made sure its use was wider:

Both house and ground were vested in trustees, expressly for the use of any preacher of any religious persuasion who might desire to say something to the people at Philadelphia; the design in building not being to accommodate any particular sect, but the inhabitants in general; so that even if the Mufti of Constantinople were to send a missionary to preach Mohammedanism to us, he would find a pulpit at his service.

The college was granted a charter in 1755 and William Smith became its provost in 1756. The school graduated its first class of seven men on May 17, 1757, six with Bachelor of Arts degrees and one with a Master of Arts.

In 1765, physicians John Morgan and William Shippen, Sr. founded the Medical School of the College of Philadelphia, the first medical school in North America. That same year the first dormitory was built.

The college educated many of the future leaders of the United States. Twenty-one members of the Continental Congress were graduates of the school, and nine signers of the Declaration of Independence were either alumni or trustees of the university. Five signers of the Constitution received undergraduate or honorary degrees from the university, and another five were trustees. Some of the soldiers who took part of the Siege of Charleston were also alumnae of the college, including Archibald Thomas.

Despite this record, at the time of the American Revolution, the trustees were seen as Loyalist sympathizers. Thomas Coombe, Jr., who had been a valedictorian, fled to England once the British army arrived in the colonies.

When the revolutionary government of Pennsylvania regained control of the city of Philadelphia after the British occupation of 1777–78, it rechartered the institution as the "University of the State of Pennsylvania", appointed new trustees, and dismissed Smith as provost.

Following repeated lawsuits by Smith and the original trustees, the state restored the college's charter in 1789, but the university continued to operate on the original campus. In 1791, the two competing institutions merged, forming the University of Pennsylvania.
