= Global Technopreneurship Challenge =

The Global Technopreneurship Challenge is an international competition organised by The Technopreneurship Institute through which global challenges are addressed, including the 14 Grand Challenges for Engineering for the 21st century and The Global Goals. Participants address the selected challenges through technology and entrepreneurship. Each year, cities from all over the world bid to host the year's Global Technopreneurship Challenge.

== About the Challenge ==
The Global Technopreneurship Challenge is run in two stages, the preliminary stage and the finals. The preliminary stage is carried out online via a massive open online course on Open Learning where participants form teams and participate in online classes and activities. During this stage the participants acquire the knowledge necessary to conceive, design, implement and operate solutions that are technologically feasible, economically viable, desirable and environmentally sustainable. The teams with the best solutions will then be invited to the finals where they will be given a chance to pitch to academics, and industrial experts as well as investors.

The first challenge was held in Kuwait in 2015.

== Global Technopreneurship Challenges ==
=== Kuwait Global Technopreneurship Challenge 2015 ===
The Kuwait Global Technopreneurship Challenge 2015 was held from July to November. It was organised by Kuwait University in collaboration with Taylor's School of Engineering and The Technopreneurship Institute.

The Kuwait Global Technopreneurship Challenge aimed to address three of the 14 grand challenges, making solar energy economical, advance personalise learning and advance health informatics. The preliminary stage of the competition was held from July to September 2015 a total of 65 teams from 151 countries worked on providing solutions to address these grand challenges. 17 teams of finalist were chosen by a panel of international judges to attend the finals in Kuwait. The finals were held from the 14th to 16 November in conjunction with the 40th anniversary of the College of Petroleum and Engineering, Kuwait University.

The winners of the challenge were: Champion: Legacy, 1st Runner Up: E-Innovation, 2nd Runner Up: Diabetes Lifecycle Management System, and Judges Choice: The Concept Crew.

==== Partners and Sponsors ====
Innovation partner - General Electric

Sponsors - KFAS, Zain, The National Fund, Boubyan Bank, BP

Supported by - Global Engineering Deans Council, Global Challenges Alliance, Asia School of Business, Open Learning.

=== Winners ===
	Champion	1st Runner Up	2nd Runner Up	Judges Choice
KGTC 2015	Legacy	E-Innovation	Diabetes Lifecycle Management System	The Concept Crew
