= Gold Ring =

Comic written by Qais Sedki

Gold Ring (Arabic: سوار الذهب, Siwari Al-Dhahab; Japanese: ゴールド・リング Gōrudo Ringu) is a comic written by Qais Sedki of the United Arab Emirates and drawn by Akira Himekawa of Japan. The series is the UAE's first manga. The comic is printed in Arabic; an English version is available through mail order.

When Sedki founded Dubai-based publishing house, Pageflip, he wrote that he wanted to fight the perception that Classical Arabic, associated with schoolwork, was "boring." To help form his comic, Sedki approached a female duo of comic book artists known under the pen name Akira Himekawa and asked for consultation on how to best express the manga style. The Himekawa duo became the artists of the books. Gold Ring was awarded the 2010 Sheikh Zayed Book Award for children's literature.

Volume 2 of Gold Ring was released on March 1, 2012. The English version of Volume 1 was scheduled for release on the following day.

In June 2014, Japanese animation studio, Gainax announced they would be developing an anime based on the comic.

== Creation and conception ==
Sedki became interested in Japan as a child. His first time traveling to Japan was in 2001. He chose Japanese illustrators so the illustration style would reflect that back in Japan.

The women under the pen name Akira Himekawa did not travel to the United Arab Emirates during the creation of Gold Ring. The women used photographs of the United Arab Emirates as references. Shogakukan Square chose the translator, located in Japan, who served as the intermediary between the writer and the artists. Sedki used his brother in law Hassan as the model of the character Hassan; Sedki stated that many readers felt that Hassan looked like him.

== Story ==
The story revolves around Sultan, an Arab boy who watches the Gold Ring falconry competition with his friend Ziyad. At the competition they find a caged falcon. Sultan convinces his friend to release the falcon into the wild. The next morning, the falcon is at Sultan's doorstep. Sultan calls the bird "Majd" and trains her for an upcoming falconry competition.

According to the Gulf News, the story is set in the UAE.

== Release ==
Sedki held a book signing for Volume 2 at Kinokuniya Dubai. He attempted to get a Guinness Book of World Records record for the largest number of books signed during a single event; at the time that record was 1,951. He got 451 books signed.
