= Hooda Shawa Qaddumi =

Kuwaiti writer

- Born: United Kingdom
- Education: American University in Cairo (BA); The College of New Jersey (MEd); Kuwait University (MA)
- Occupations: Writer, professor
- Years active: 2009–present

Hooda Shawa Qaddumi (Arabic:هدى الشوا قدومي) is a Palestinian-Kuwaiti-British writer of children's and young adult literature. She was born to a Palestinian father and a British mother in the United Kingdom. She has won several awards, including the Sheikh Zayed Book Award for Children's Literature for her book The Birds’ Journey to Mount Qaf in 2008.

== Life ==
Hooda Shawa Qaddumi grew up in the United Kingdom, and currently lives in Kuwait with her husband and their two children. She works as a professor of English at Kuwait University. Al Qaddumi studied at the American University in Cairo, where she obtained a bachelor's degree in economics and political science, and then received a Master of Education in Teaching English from The College of New Jersey in the US. She obtained a master's degree in comparative literature from Kuwait University.

In 2008, her book The Journey of Birds to Mount Qaf won the Sheikh Zayed Book Award for Children's Literature. It is inspired by the poetic writing of the story "The Conference of the Birds" by the twelfth-century Persian Sufi poet Farid al-Din al-Attar. The book also won the Best Direction Book Award at the Beirut Arab International Book Fair.

== Works ==
- A Birds’ Journey to Mount Qaf (original title: Rihlat Al Tuyoor ila Jabal Al Qaf), 2009
- The Animal’s Vs the Humans at the Court of the King of the Jinn (original title: Da’wa Al Hayawan Thid Al Insan Inda Malik Al Jann), 2012
- The Yellow Man (original title: Al Rajul Al Asfar)
- The Secret Revealer (original title: Kasheb Al Asrar), 2013
- The Elephant’s Journey (original title: Rihlat Al Feel), 2015
- Apollo on Gaza Beach (original title: Tneen Bait Laham), 2017
- The Necklace of Seven Souls (originally published in 2019, translated from Arabic to English by Nour Jaljuli and Sawad Hussain), 2026
