= Thomas Coombe (priest) =

American priest & poet (1747–1822)

Thomas Coombe Jr. (21 October 1747 – 15 August 1822) was an Anglican priest and a poet.

Thomas Coombe was born in Philadelphia to Thomas Coombe (1722–1799) and Sarah Rutter (c. 1724–1793). He attended the College of Philadelphia and was the valedictorian of his graduating class. As a student, he displayed writerly promise which he developed throughout his life; as a clergyman, his sermons were recognized for their craft and persuasiveness. In 1768, Coombe Jr. traveled to London, seeking the priesthood. During this visit, he stayed at the home of family friend Benjamin Franklin. Coombe Jr. was ordained in 1771 and returned to Philadelphia to continue his ministry the following year. He came to be known as a moving and memorable preacher, and several of his sermons were published and distributed throughout the colonies. He was elected as a member to the American Philosophical Society in 1773.

In one popular 1775 sermon, he expressed support for the colonial cause; however, at the outbreak of the American Revolutionary War, Coombe refused to break his ordination vows of fidelity to the British government by pronouncing his support of the Declaration of Independence. He was arrested for this refusal in 1777 and managed to avoid imprisonment in Virginia by claiming he was in poor health. When the British army arrived in the colonies, Coombe Jr. was given permission to sail for England, where he lived out the rest of his life. While living abroad, he continued his ministry as a priest and chaplain, he published a book of poetry, and he continued his education, obtaining a Doctor of Divinity degree from Trinity College in 1781. Coombe Jr. was married twice and, upon his death in 1822, left his wife and his four surviving children a sizable fortune.
