= Abdullah Al Busais =

Kuwaiti novelist

- Born: Kuwait
- Education: Diploma in Technological Sciences
- Occupations: poet, novelist
- Years active: 2009 - present
- Awards: Won an award in fiction writing at the Sharjah Book Fair, 2017

Abdallah Al Busais (Arabic: عبدالله البصيص) is a Kuwaiti poet and novelist who published one Nabatean poetry collection, one short story collection, and four published novels including Lost Memory and Qaf is a Killer and Seen is Happy. In 2017, he won an award in fiction writing at the Sharjah Book Fair for his novel and it was translated into Chinese language.

== Biography ==
Abdullah Al Busais is a Kuwaiti poet and novelist who earned a diploma in technological sciences. He started his career as a Nabatean poet as he was influenced by his father's salon and friends who recited Nabatean and narrating stories about Bedouin, heroes, and lovers. In 2009, Al Busais participated in a TV competition called Poet of the Million. He also published a collections of poems titled The Collection of Ideas. Al Busais shifted from writing poems to writing short shorts then to novels. In 2009, he published his first short story collection titled The Diwaniya which was published by a Gulf publishing house. Then, in 2014, Al Busais published his second book Stray Memories. The American Vice magazine included his novel Stray Memories among its list of the "six banned middle earners books you should read". In 2016, Al Busais published his second novel The Taste of the Wolf which was censored for publications in Kuwait. However, the novel won the Best Arabic Novel Award at the Sharjah Book Fair in 2017 and was translated into Chinese by China International Press. His latest novel Qaf is a Killer and Seed is Happy was published in 2019 by Riwayat Publishing.

== Works ==
=== Poetry collection ===
- "The Collection of Ideas" (original title: Diwan Al Afkar)

=== Short story collection ===
- Al Diwanya, 2009, (ISBN: 9789995830069)

=== Novels ===
- "Stary Memories" (original title: Thikrayat Dallaa), 2014 (ISBN: 9789953687261)
- "The Taste of Wolf" (original title: Ta'am Al Theb), 2016 (ISBN: 9789953687261)
- "Qaf is a Killer and Seen is Happy" (original title: Qaf Qatel Seen Sa'eed), 2019 (ISBN: 9789948379805)

== See also ==
- Abderrazak Belagrouz
- Hussein Al Mutawaa
- Mohamed Ait Mihoub
