= University of the State of Pennsylvania =

Coordinates: 39.950°N 75.192°W

The institution now known as the University of Pennsylvania was founded as a secondary school in Philadelphia in 1740. By the time the American Revolution commenced, it had grown to include a college and medical school called the College of Philadelphia.

While it operated under a state charter, it was a private institution with its own board of trustees, many of whom were Loyalists, and when the revolutionary government of Pennsylvania regained control Philadelphia following the British occupation of it in 1777 and 1778,.

It rechartered the institution as the "University of the State of Pennsylvania," appointed new trustees, and dismissed Provost William Smith. In 1789, following repeated lawsuits by Smith and the original trustees, the state restored the college's charter, but the university continued to operate on the original campus. The two competing institutions merged in 1791, forming the University of Pennsylvania.
