= Qais Sedki =

Emirati children's author

Qais Sedki (Arabic: قيس صدقي) is an Emirati children's author. The first volume of his Arabic comic Gold Ring won the Sheikh Zayed Book Award for Children's Literature in the year 2010.

Sedki left his IT job to pursue a career in comic book writing. He founded Pageflip, a Dubai-based publishing house that publishes his work. He has three children.

He also has a master's degree in business administration from the American University of Sharjah.
