= Asma AlAhmadi =

Saudi writer and critic

Asma bint Muqbi bin Awad Al-Ahmadi
- Occupations: Academic writer and critic
- Awards: The Sharjah Award for Gulf women's creations in 2019. The Sheikh Zayed book award for the young author's section in 2021.

Asma bint Muqbi bin Awad Al-Ahmadi (Arabic: أسماء بنت مقبل بن عوض الأحمدي) is a Saudi academic writer and critic.

== Academic qualifications and expertise ==
Dr. Al-Ahmadi hold a Ph.D. degree in Philosophy- in Arabic Language and Literature, she is currently working as an assistant professor in the Department of Islamic Culture and Language Skills at the faculty of Science and Literature in King Abdulaziz University since 1434 AH (2012/2013CE). Previously, she was a general teacher of Arabic from 1428 AH (2007/2008CE) to 1434 AH (2012/2013CE).

== Works ==
"Critical study: Problems of the secret self in the Saudi women's novels (1999–2012)" (Arabic title: I'shkaliyat Al-that Al-saridah fe Al-riwayat Al-nisa'eyah Al-saudiyah), published by Arab Scientific Publishers in 2020, and the book "The phenomenon of leaving in the Saudi short story- an artistic study" (Arabic title: Thahirat Al-raheal fe Al-Qisah Al-Qasirah fi Al-mamlakah Al-Arabia Al-Saudiyah- Dirasah Faniyah), published by Al-Jouf Literary Club and Arab Diffusion Company in 2013.

A story collection called "Between them Isthmus" (Arabic title: Baynahoma barzik), published by Jazan Literary Club and Arab Scientific Publishers in 2017. She wrote some stories published in a joint book by selected Arab writers entitled (Arabic title: Shatharat Al-qawafi) published by Dar Qalam Al-Khayal for publishing and distribution in 2017.

=== Academic Articles ===
Dr. Al-Ahmadi also has numerous articles published in scientific journals throughout the world. Much of these academic articles focus on hearing impairment. Some of her published articles:

- Alahmadi, Asma; Abdelsamad, Yassin; Thabet, Elsaeid M.; Hafez, Ahmed; Alghamdi, Fares; Badr, Khalid M.; Alghamdi, Saeed; Hagr, Abdulrahman (February 2024). "Advancing Cochlear Implant Programming: X-ray Guided Anatomy-Based Fitting". Otology & Neurotology. 45 (2): 107–113. doi:10.1097/MAO.0000000000004069. ISSN 1537-4505. LCCN 00208335. OCLC 45049488 – via Lippincott.
- Alahmadi, Asma; Abdelsamad, Yassin; Yousef, medhat; Alhabib, Salman F.; Alshalan, Afrah; Hamed, Nezar; Alzhrani, Farid (2023-09-12). "Risk factors and management strategies of inadvertent facial nerve stimulation in cochlear implant recipients: A systematic review". Laryngoscope Investigative Otolaryngology. 9 (1): 1345–1356. doi:10.1002/lio2.1121. eISSN 2378-8038. PMC 10601549 – via Wiley.
- Alahmadi, Asma; Abdelsamad, Yassin; Al-Zuraiqi, Bassam; Alghamdi, Saeed; Hagr, Abdulrahman; Saleh, Essam (2023-07-18). "Cochlear Implantation in Radiation-Induced Hearing Loss: A Systematic Review". Otology & Neurotology. 44 (8) (published 2023-09-01): 767–774. doi:10.1097/MAO.0000000000003953. ISSN 1537-4505. LCCN 00208335. OCLC 45049488. PMID 37464460 – via Lippincott.
- Alahmadi, Asma; Abdelsamad, Yassin; Alothman, Noura I.; Alshalan, Afrah; Almuhawas, Fida; AlAmari, Nouf A.; Alyousef, Mohammed Y.; Alhabib, Salman F.; Hagr, Abdulrahman (2023-08-08). "A Literature Review on Cochlear Implant Activation: From Weeks to Hours". Ear, Nose & Throat Journal. doi:10.1177/01455613231188294. eISSN 1942-7522 – via Sage Journals.
- Alahmadi, Asma; Abdelsamad, Yassin; Almuhawas, Fida; Hamed, Nezar; Salamah, Marzouqi; Alsanosi, Abdulrahman (2023-01-06). "Cochlear Implantation: The Volumetric Measurement of Vestibular Aqueduct and Gusher Prediction". Journal of Personalized Medicine. 13 (2) (published 2023-01-19): 171. doi:10.3390/jpm13020171. eISSN 2075-4426. LCCN 2013247558. OCLC 821533421. PMC 9961179. PMID 36836405 – via MDPI.
- Salamah, Marzouqi A.; Al-Ahmadi, Asma; Arabi, Sahal; Alsaleh, Waleed A.; Aljuwayyan, Abdullah; Yousef, Medhat F.; Halawani, Roa; Hagr, Abdulrahman (2022-11-10). "The Influence of the COVID-19 Pandemic on the Hearing Impaired". Cureus. 14 (11) e31348. doi:10.7759/cureus.31348. PMC 9741701.

== Awards ==
Asma Al-Ahmadi won the Sharjah Award for Gulf women's creations in 2019. In 2021, she won the Sheikh Zayed book award for the young author's section for "Critical study: Problems of the secret self in the Saudi women's novels (1999–2012)" (Arabic title: I'shkaliyat Al-that Al-saridah fe Al-riwayat Al-nisa'eyah Al-saudiyah), published by Arab Scientific Publishers in 2020.
