= Said Khatibi =

Algerian writer (born 1984)

- سعيد خطيبي
- Born: 1984 (age 41–42); Algeria
- Occupations: Writer, journalist
- Writing career
- Language: Arabic, French
- Notable works: Firewood of Sarajevo, The Inflamed Garden
- Notable awards: Sheikh Zayed Book Award (2020), International Prize for Arabic Fiction (2026)

Said Khatibi is an Algerian award winning writer.

== Biography ==
Khatibi was born in Bou Saâda in 1984. He studied at the University of Algiers and at the Sorbonne. He lives in Slovenia.

== Works ==
- The Book of Faults (kitab al-khataya), novel, 2013
- The Gardens of the East Afflamed (jana’in al-sharq al-multahiba), travel in the Balkans, 2015
- Forty Years Waiting for Isabel, novel, 2016
- Firewood of Sarajevo, novel, 2018
- Swimming Against the Tide, novel, 2025

=== Awards ===
2017- Forty Years Waiting for Isabelle won the Katara Prize for Arabic Novel

2020- Firewood of Sarajevo was shortlisted for the International Prize for Arabic Fiction

2023- The End of the Desert won the Sheikh Zayed Book Award for Young Author

2026- Swimming Against the Tide won the International Prize for Arabic Fiction

=== Translations ===
Forty Years Waiting for Isabel was translated into Spanish by Noemi Fierro Bandera.

Firewood of Sarajevo and The End of the Sahara have both been translated into English.

Khatibi has also translated the poetry of Kateb Yacine, and a volume of Algerian short stories into French.
