= Said Yaktine =

Moroccan writer and literary critic (born 1955)

Said Yaktine (born 1955) is a Moroccan writer and literary critic.

== Early life ==
He was born in Casablanca. He obtained a PhD from the Mohammed the Fifth University in Rabat, and has worked as an academic ever since. He has published more than a dozen books on various aspects of Arabic literature and culture.

== Career ==
He supervises the Novels of Time series issued by Time Publications in Rabat. He served on the judging panel of the 2011 Arabic Booker Prize. He won the 2016 Sheikh Zayed Book Award in the Literary and Art Criticism category for Al-Fikr al-Adabi al-‘Arabi (Arabic Literary Thought).

== Awards and honours ==
Yaktine won the foremost literary prize in Morocco in 1989 and 1997. He won the Abd al-Hamid Shufan Prize (Jordan) in 1992.
