= Jeffrey Tessler =

CEO of Clearstream

Jeffrey Tessler was the chief executive officer of Clearstream until 2015 and a member of the executive board of Deutsche Börse from 2004 to 2018. He was formerly an executive vice president of the Bank of New York. He joined the supervisory boards of Eurex Clearing and Eurex Frankfurt, which operates Eurex Exchange, in April 2016, becoming chairman in 2018.

== Education ==
He received an MBA from Seton Hall University in New Jersey (1983) and a BA in political science from The College of New Jersey in 1975.
