= Archibald Gamble =

Irish educator

Archibald Gamble (1740–1784) was an Irish educator.

Archibald Gamble was born to Sally Montgomery and Joseph Gamble near Banbridge, Ireland. Gamble spent some of his childhood in America and returned in 1768 to attend the College of Philadelphia. While studying for his bachelor's degree, he worked as a Latin tutor. He graduated in 1771 and the following year received a master's degree from the College of New Jersey. During the Revolutionary War, Gamble worked as an engineer under Major General Benjamin Lincoln and took part in the Siege of Charleston in South Carolina.

In 1777, he married Mary Lisle, daughter of John Lisle of Philadelphia. Together they had four children: Sarah, Nancy, Archibald, and Thomas. Gamble returned to the University of Pennsylvania in 1782 as a professor of oratory and English language, a position which he held until he died in 1784. That same year, he was elected as a member of the American Philosophical Society.

He is buried at the Laurel Hill Cemetery in Philadelphia.
