= Manouba University =

University in Tunisia

- جامعـــة منوبـــة
- Type: Public
- Established: 2000
- President: Chokri El Mabkhout
- Students: 26,138
- Location: Manouba, Tunisia
- Website: www.uma.rnu.tn

Manouba University is a public university in Manouba, Tunisia.

== Organization ==
- National School of Computer Sciences
- Higher Institute of Multimedia Arts of Manouba
- Press and Information Sciences Institute
- Business School of Tunis
- Manouba School of Engineering

== National School of Computer Sciences ==
National School of Computer Sciences
- المدرسة الوطنيّة لعلوم الإعلامية
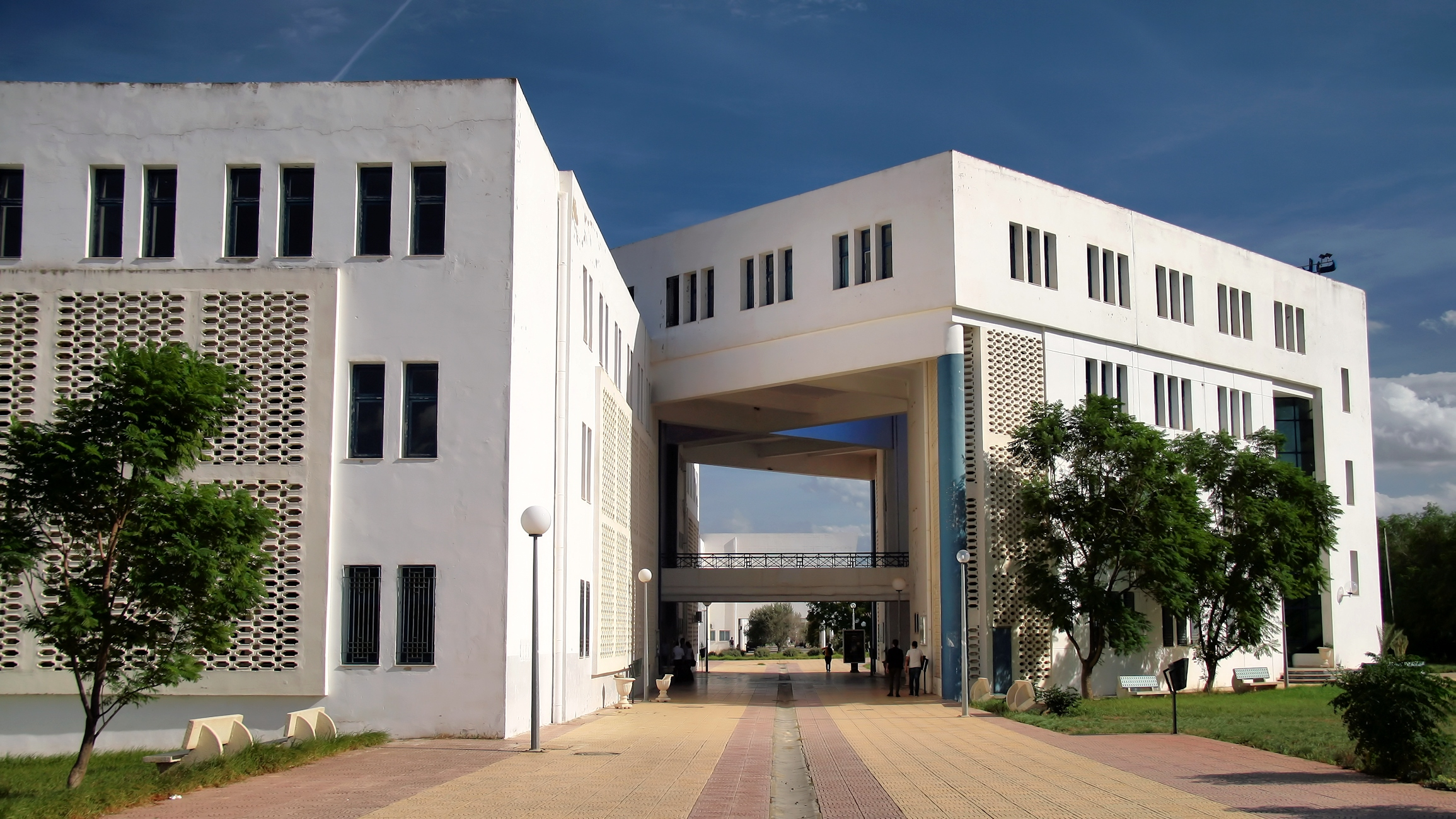
- ENSI square.
- Type: Public
- Established: 1984
- Location: Manouba, Tunisia; 36°48′36″N 10°3′36″E
- Language: Arabic, French, English
- Website: www.ensi-uma.tn
- Location within Tunisia

The National School of Computer Sciences (Arabic: المدرسة الوطنيّة لعلوم الإعلامية) or ENSI, is an engineering school founded in 1984.

== Manouba School of Engineering ==
The Manouba School of Engineering or MSE is the first public engineering school in Tunisia offering programmes exclusively taught in English. It was created on April 25, 2022. MSE provides training in engineering and applied sciences, environment, data science, technology, humanities and communication.

MSE has two departments: Ecological Engineereing and Geomatics Engineering
