= Abderrazak Belagrouz =

Algerian Scholar and writer

- Born: 7 July 1981 (age 45); Algeria
- Education: PhD in the Science and Philosophy of Values and Knowledge
- Occupations: writer, scholar
- Years active: 2009–present
- Awards: Sheikh Zayed Book Award, 2019

Abderrazak Belagrouz (Arabic: عبد الرزاق بلعقروز) is an Algerian academic writer who was born on 1981. He published more than 10 books and academic research. In 2019, Belagrouz won the young author award of Sheikh Zayed Book Award for his book "The Essence of Values and the Freedom of Social Concepts".

== Education and career ==
Abderrazak Belagrouz is an Algerian scholar and writer who was born on 7 July 1981. Belagrouz holds a PhD in the Science and Philosophy of Values and Knowledge. From 2005 to 2012, he worked as a high school teacher in Setif Province, Algeria. Since 2012, he has been working as a lecturer in the Department of Philosophy at the University of Setif-2. He founded the Algerian Society for Philosophical Studies on 25 June 2012. He had published more than ten books including "Transformations of Modern Philosophical Thinking: Questions on Concept, Meaning and Connection" and "The Crisis of Modernity and the Stakes in the Islamic Discourse". Most of his published works are about philosophy, moral values, Islamic philosophical thinking, and the problems of modernity religion. Belagrouz has also published some academic articles in Islamia Al Maa’rafa including “Moral Values and the Social Sciences: Towards the Epistemology of Governing Values”, and “High Modernity and Manifestations of the Separation of Contemporary Media from Value”. In 2019, Belagrouz won the young author award of Sheikh Zayed Book Award for his book “The Essence of Values and the Freedom of Social Concepts".

== Works ==
- Transformations of Modern Philosophical Thinking: Questions on Concept, Meaning and Connection, 2009.
- Neitzsche and the Mission of Philosophy, 2010
- The Philosophical Question and Paths of Openness: Interpretations of Arab Thinking of Modernity and Post Modernity 2010
- The Crisis of Modernity and the Stakes in the Islam Discourse, 2013
- Knowledge and Suspicion: the Skeptical Questioning of the Value of Knowledge for Nietzsche and its Extensions in Contemporary Philosophical Thinking, 2013
- The Power of Holiness, 2014
- Introduction to General Philosophy, 205
- Conceptual Approaches to Philosophical and Intellectual Investigations, 2015
- Transformations of Modern Philosophical Thinking: Questions on Concept, Meaning and Connection, 2017
- The Philosophy of Religion; Concepts, Problems and Directions, 2018
- Aspects of Taha Abdel-Rahman's Jurisprudence: Modernity, Globalization, Rationality and Cultural Renewal, 2018
- Horizons of Openness to the Taha Abdul Rahman Project, 2019
- Reflections on Important Intellectual Matters, 2019
- The Question of the Approach in Social Sciences, 2019

=== Academic articles ===
- “Moral Values and the Social Sciences: Towards the Epistemology of Governing Values”, 2015
- “High Modernity and Manifestations of the Separation of Contemporary Media from Value”, 2015

== Awards ==
- 2019: His book “Transformations of Modern Philosophical Thinking: Questions on Concept, Meaning and Connection” won the young author award of Sheikh Zayed Book Award.

== See also ==
- Hussein Al Mutawaa
- Abdallah Al Busais
- Mohamed Ait Mihoub
