= Sheikh Zayed Book Award =

Annual book award

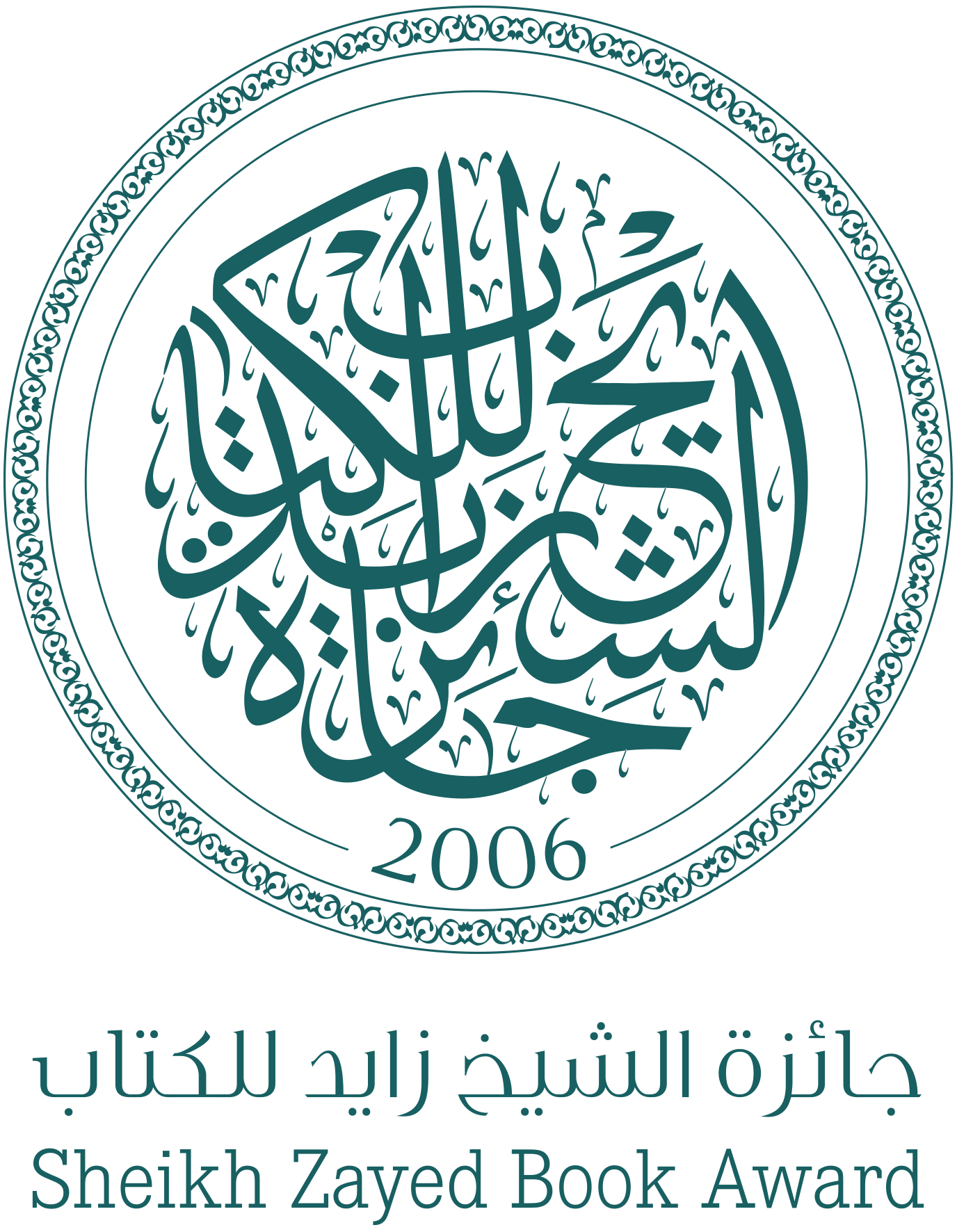
- Awarded for: Arab writers, intellectuals, publishers
- Date: annual
- Country: United Arab Emirates
- First award: 2007
- Website: www.zayedaward.ae

The Sheikh Zayed Book Award is a literary award presented yearly to writers, intellectuals, publishers whose writings and scholarly publications contributed to Arab cultural, literary and social life. The award has been described as “the Arab World’s equivalent to the Nobel Prize”. The first award was in 2007. The total value of the prizes is DH 7,000,000 making it one of the richest literary awards in the world.

The award is named in memory of Sheikh Zayed bin Sultan Al Nahyan, the founding father of the United Arab Emirates.

== History ==
Beginning with 2013 awards, a new category was added called "Arabic Culture in Other Languages", "to honor best written works in Chinese, German and English languages on the subject of the Arabic civilization and culture including novels, short stories, poems, biographies, history and arts." In addition a number of other categories were merged, created or redefined.

In 2018, the Sheikh Zayed Book Award launched a translation grant, to encourage the translation of Arabic literature into other languages. The grant is open year-round to publishers and translators around the world to publish shortlisted or award-winning literary works from the Award’s Literature and Young Author prize categories.

In 2021, German philosopher Jürgen Habermas declined his Zayed Book Award, citing the UAE's political system (a repressive non-democracy). A media debate ensued with some German commentators arguing that he should not have renounced the award.

== Award categories ==
the Award presents a range of annual prizes in different categories such as ‘Literature’, ‘Translation’, ‘Arabic Culture in Other Languages’, and ‘Cultural Personality of the Year’.

The "Cultural Person of the Year" is the category which honours a prominent Arab or international figure (or organisation) who has contributed to the advancement of Arabic culture. It bestows an award of one million Dirhams (around $300,000) while the other categories receive around $200,000 each.

- Sheikh Zayed Award for Arts
- Sheikh Zayed Award for Best Technology in the Cultural Field
- Sheikh Zayed Award for Children's Literature
- Sheikh Zayed Award for Cultural Personality of the Year
- Sheikh Zayed Award for Development and State Building
- Sheikh Zayed Award for Literature
- Sheikh Zayed Award for Manuscript Editing
- Sheikh Zayed Award for Publishing and Distribution
- Sheikh Zayed Award for Translation
- Sheikh Zayed Award for Young Author

== Winners ==
2007

- Cultural Personality of the Year: Denys Johnson-Davies
- Literature: Wacini Laredj, The Prince and the Passage of the Iron Doors
- Fine arts: Tharwat Ukhasha, The Indian Art
- Translation: Georges Zinaty, Althat a'inha Ka'khr (translated from French to Arabic)
- Contribution to the Development of Nations: Bashir Mohamed Al-Khadra, The Prophetic – Caliphate Pattern in the Arab Political Leadership and Democracy
- Young author: Mahmoud Zein Al-Abedeen, Architecture of the Ottoman Mosques
- Children's literature: Mohammed Ali Ahmad, A Journey on Paper

2008

- Cultural Personality of the Year: Mohamed Benaissa
- Literature: Ibrahim al Kouni, Call of What Was Far
- Fine arts: Rifat Chadirji, Dialectics and Causality of Architecture
- Translation: Faiz Assayagh, Sociology
- Young author: Mohamed Saadi, The Future of International Relations
- Publishing and Distribution: Emirates Centre for Scientific Research and Studies
- Children's literature: Huda Al-Shawwa Qadoumi, The Journey of Birds: To Qaf Mountain (about Mount Qaf)

2009

- Cultural Personality of the Year: Pedro Martinez Montavez
- Literature: Jamal Al Ghitani, Ren
- Fine arts: Maher Rady, Thought of Light
- Translation: Sa'ad Abdulaziz Maslouh, Translation Theory: Contemporary Trends (translation of Edwin Gentzler's Contemporary Translation Theories)
- Contribution to the Development of Nations: Baqer Salman Al Najjar, The Strenuous Democracy in the Arabian Gulf
- Young author: Youcef Oghlici, The Intricacy of Terminology in the New Arab Discourse
- Publishing and Distribution: Dar Al Masriah Al Lubnaniah

2010

- Cultural Personality of the Year: Khalid bin Mohammed Al Qasimi
- Best Contribution to the Development of the Country: Ammar AM Hasan, The Political Establishment of Sufism in Egypt
- Young author: Mohammad Al Mallakh, Time in Arabic Language: Its Linguistic Structure and Significance
- Translation: Albert Habib Mutlaq, The Animal Encyclopedia
- Fine arts: Iyad Al Husseini, The Art of Design
- Children's literature: Qais Sedki, Gold Ring
- Publishing and Distribution: Nahdet Misr Publishing and Printing
- Literature: Hafnaoui Baali, Comparative Cultural Criticism- an Introduction (Note: Award withdrawn due to "research methodologies and ethics employed by the author" i.e. plagiarism)

2011

- Cultural Personality of the Year: Xhong Jikun
- Contribution to the Development of Nations: Abdul Raouf Sinno, Harb Lubnan 1975–1990
- Literature: Mohammad Miftah, Mafaheem Muwasa'a Li Nazaryah Shi'ryah
- Translation: Mohammad Ziyad Kibbeh, Al Tharwah wa lqtisad Al Ma'rifah (trans from Revolutionary Wealth by Alvin and Heidi Toffler)
- Children's literature: Affaf Tobbala, Al Bayt Wal Nakhlah

2012

- Cultural Personality of the Year: UNESCO
- Fine Arts: Shaker Abdel-Hamid, Art and Eccentrics
- Translation: Husserl, Edmund (2011). Afkar Mumahhida li 'ilm al-ẓahiriyyat al-khalis wa lil falsafah al-ẓahiriyyatiyyah أفكار ممهدة لعلم الظاهريات الخالص وللفلسفة الظاهرياتية [Ideas Pertaining to a Pure Phenomenology and to a Phenomenological Philosophy]. Translated by Marzouki, Abu Yaareb. Beirut: Jadawel. ISBN 9786144180440.
- Young author: Layla Al Obaidi, Al Fakh in Islam ("Humor in Islam")
- Publishing and Distribution: Brill Publishers
- Best Technology in the Field of Culture: Paju Bookcity
- Children's Literature: Abdo Wazen, The Boy Who Saw the Color of Air

2013

- Cultural Personality of the Year: Ahmed el-Tayeb (Egypt)
- Arab Culture in Non-Arabic Languages: Marina Warner (UK), Stranger Magic: Charmed States and the Arabian Nights
- Translation: Fathi Meskini (Tunisia), Being and Time (from the German by Martin Heidegger)
- Literary and Art Criticism: Abdullah Ibrahim (Iraq), Al Takhayol Al Tarikhi (Historic Visualization)
- Publishing and Cultural Technologies: National Council for Culture, Arts and Literature, Kuwait
- Best Contribution to the Development of the Country: Elizabeth Kassab (Lebanon), Contemporary Arab Thought (Arabic: Al Fikr al 'arabi al Mu'aser)
- Young Author: Adil Hadjami (Morocco), Falsafat Jeel Deleuze ("Deleuze philosophy on Existentialism and Difference")

2014

- Cultural Personality of the Year: Abdullah bin Abdul Aziz, Ruler of the Kingdom of Saudi Arabia
- Contribution to the Development of Nations: Saeed Abdullah Al Soyan for his study "The Epic of Human Evolution"
- Children's Literature: Jawdat Fakhr Eldine for his book "Thirty Poems for Children"
- Young Author: Rami Abu Shihab for his book "Permanence and Deception: Post-Colonial Discourse in the Contemporary Arab Criticism"
- Translation: Mohammed Al Tahir Al Mansouri (Tunisia) for translating the book "Housing the Stranger in the Mediterranean World"
- Literature: Abdel Rasheed Mahmoudi (Egypt) for his novel "After Coffee"
- Literary and Art Criticism: (no award)
- Arabic Culture in Other Languages: Mario Liverani (Italy) for his book "Imagining Babylon"
- Publishing and Technology: Arab Foundation "House of Wisdom", from Tunisia

2015

- Cultural Personality of the Year: Sheikh Mohammed bin Rashid Al Maktoum
- Contribution to the Development of Nations: (no award)
- Children's Literature: (no award)
- Young Author: (no award)
- Translation: Hanawa Haruo (Japan) for translating Naguib Mahfouz's Cairo Trilogy into Arabic
- Literature: Osama Alaysa (Palestine) for his novel Majaneen bait lahem ("The fools of Bethlehem")
- Literary and Art Criticism: (no award)
- Arabic Culture in Other Languages: Sugita Hideaki (Japan) for Arabian-Naito to Nihon-Jin ("The Arabian Nights and the Japanese")
- Publishing and Technology: Arab Scientific Publishers Inc. (Lebanon)

2016

- Cultural Personality of the Year: Amin Maalouf
- Children's Literature: (no award)
- Young Author: (no award)
- Contribution to the Development of Nations: Jamal Sanad Al-Suwaidi (UAE) for Al-Sarab (The Mirage)
- Translation: Keyan Yahya (Iraq) for translation of The Meaning of Meaning by Ogden and Richards
- Literature: Ibrahim Abdelmeguid (Egypt) for Ma Wara’a al-Kitaba (Beyond Writing)
- Literary and Art Criticism: Said Yaktine for Al-Fikr al-Adabi al-‘Arabi (Arabic Literary Thought)
- Arab Culture in Other Languages: Roshdi Rashed (Egypt) for Angles et Grandeur
- Publishing and Technology: Dar Al-Saqi publishers of London

2017

- Cultural Personality of the Year: Abdallah Laroui
- Children's Literature: Lateefa Buti (Kuwait) for Bila qubba’a (Hatless)
- Contribution to the Development of Nations: Mohammad Chahrour (Syria) for Al Islam wal Insan (Islam and the Human Being)
- Translation: Ziad Bou Akl (Lebanon/France) for translation from Arabic to French of Ibn Rushd, Al-Darûrî fî usûl al-fiqh (Averroès: Le Philosophe Et La Loi)
- Literature: Abbas Beydoun (Lebanon) for Khareef al Bara’a (The Autumn of Innocence)
- Literary and Art Criticism: Said Al Ghanimi (Iraq/Australia) for Fā‘iliyyat al-Khayāl al-Adabī (The Validity of Literary Fiction)
- Arab Culture in Other Languages: David Wirmer for Vom Denken der Natur zur Natur des Denkens
- Publishing and Technology: Kalimat Group, Sharjah, UAE

2018

- Arabic Culture in Other Languages: Dag Nikolaus Hasse
- Literature: Khalil Sweileh
- Children's Literature: Hessa Al Muhairi
- Literary and Art Criticism: Mohamed Mechbal
- Translation: Naji Al 'Awnali
- Publishing and Technology: Dar Al Tanweer
- Cultural Personality of the Year: Arab World Institute
- Young Author: Ahmad Al Qarmalawy

2019

- Publishing and Technology: The Arabic Center for Geographic Literature "Irtiyad al-Afaq"
- Cultural Personality of the Year: Jaroslav Stetkevych & Suzanne Stetkevych
- Arabic Culture in Other Languages: Philip Kennedy
- Children's Literature: Hussain Al Mutawaa
- Literary and Art Criticism: Charbel Dagher
- Literature: Bensalem Himmich
- Young Author: Abderrazak Belagrouz

2020

- Arabic Culture in Other Languages: Richard van Leeuwen
- Children's Literature: Ibtisam Barakat
- Cultural Personality of the Year: Salma Khadra Jayyusi
- Literature: Moncef Ouahibi
- Publishing and Technology: Banipal
- Translation: Mohamed Ait Mihoub
- Young Author: Hayder Qasim

2021

- Arabic Culture in Other Languages: Tahera Qutbuddin
- Children's Literature: Mizouni Bannani
- Contribution to the Development of Nations: Saeed El-Masry
- Literary and Art Criticism: Khelil Gouia
- Literature: Iman Mersal
- Publishing and Technology: Dar Al Jadeed
- Translation: Michael Cooperson
- Young Author: Asma bint Muqbel bin Awad Al-Ahmadi

2022

- Arabic Culture in Other Languages: Muhsin Al-Musawi
- Children's Literature: Maria Dadouch
- Literary and Art Criticism: Mohamed Aldahi
- Literature: Maysoon Saqer
- Publishing and Technology: Bibliotheca Alexandrina
- Translation: Ahmed Aladawi
- Young Author: Mohamed Al-Maztouri

2023

- Arabic Culture in Other Languages: Mathieu Tillier
- Literary and Art Criticism: Jalila bint Mohammed bin al-Mahjoub Tritar
- Literature: Ali Jaafar Al Allaq
- Publishing and Technology: Dar ElAin Publishing
- Translation: Ali Al Saadi
- Young Author: Said Khatibi

2024

- Arabic Culture in Other Languages: Frank Griffel
- Contribution to the Development of Nations: Khalifa Alromaithi
- Editing of Arabic Manuscripts: Mustafa Said
- Literature: Reem Bassiouney
- Publishing and Technology: Bayt Elhekma for Creative Industries
- Translation: Ahmed Somai
- Young Author: Houssem Eddine Chachia

2025

- Cultural Personality of the Year: Haruki Murakami
- Literature: Hoda Barakat, Hind, or the Most Beautiful Woman in the World (Dar al Adab, 2024)
- Children's Literature: Latifa Labsir, The Phantom of Sabiba (Markaz Kitab, 2024)
- Arab Culture in Other Languages: Andrew Peacock, Arab Literature in Southeast Asia in the Seventeenth and Eighteenth Centuries (Brill, 2024)
- Translation: Marco di Branco, Orosius (Pisa University Press, 2024)
- Editing of Arabic Manuscripts: Rasheed Alkhayoun, News of Women (King Faisal Centre for Research and Islamic Studies, 2024)
- Contribution to the Development of Nations: Mohamed Bashari, The Right to Strive: Perspectives on Muslim Women's Rights (Nahdet Misr Publishing, 2024)
- Literary and Art Criticism: Said Laouadi, Food and Language: Cultural Excavations in Arabic Heritage (Afrique Orient, 2023)
