= Kuwait University =

Public university in Kuwait City, Kuwait

- جامعة الكويت
- Type: Public
- Established: 8 October 1966; 60 years ago
- President: Dina Al-Mailam
- Faculty: 1,695
- Undergraduates: 39,891
- Location: Sabah Al Salem University City, Kuwait (Main campus), Kuwait; 29.25761°N 47.89976°E
- Campus: 6 million square meters area; Urban area
- Website: http://ku.edu.kw

Kuwait University (Arabic: جامعة الكويت, romanized: Jāmiʻat al-Kuwayt, abbreviated as Kuniv) is a public university located in Kuwait City, Kuwait.

The university was ranked #851–900 in the 2027 QS World University Rankings.

== History ==
Kuwait University (KU), (in Arabic: جامعة الكويت), was established in October 1966 under Act N. 29/1966. The university was officially inaugurated on 27 November 1966 to include the College of Science, the College of Arts, the College of Education and the College for Women. The university is the state's first public institution of higher education and research.

The university aims to preserve and transmit knowledge through scholarship, and encourage innovation and development in the arts and the sciences. It comprises 17 colleges offering 76 undergraduate, 71 graduate programs.

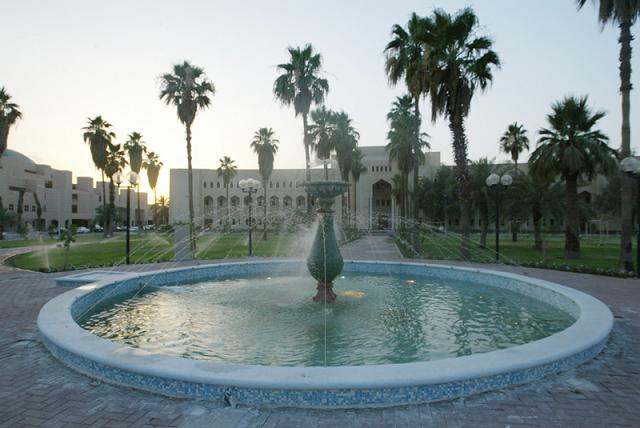
Shuwaikh Campus

The university facilities are spread over six campuses, offering programs in the sciences, engineering, humanities, medical and social sciences. Students are awarded Bachelor, Master and Doctoral degrees.

In November 2015, the university organised the Kuwait Global Technopreneurship Challenge (KGTC).

== Campus ==
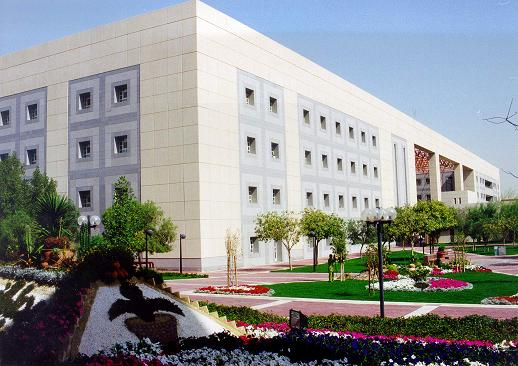
Khaldiya Campus

The six campuses that comprise the university are Adailiya, Shuwaikh, Keifan, Khaldiya, Fintas, and Jabriya. They are minutes away from downtown Kuwait City. The main access to the Shuwaikh campus, Jamal Abdul Nassar Street, overlooks the Arabian Gulf.

In 2019, the new 490-hectare (1,211-acre) Sabah Alsalem University City located in Shadadiyah was established for Kuwait University. It consolidate six different campuses currently dispersed throughout Kuwait City.

== Organization and development ==
The university has seen its enrollment grow from about 418 to 40,000 students, faculty from 31 to 1,565, colleges from 4 to 17, and administrative and academic support personnel from 200 to more than 5,000. Kuwait University has more than 100,000 alumni serving the country and the region and some have attained prominent positions.

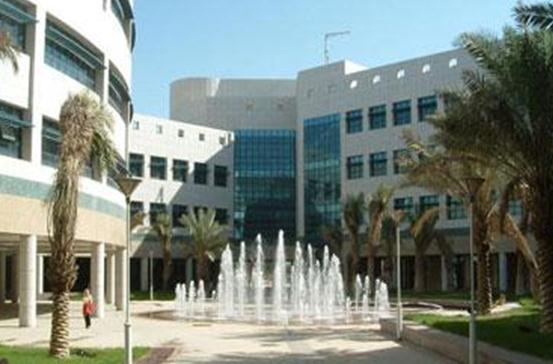
College of Law

The strategic plan of the university is set by the government. Its executive powers are vested in the President, who heads the university, and is responsible for its scientific, intellectual, technical, administrative and financial affairs. The President oversees implementation of KU laws, bylaws and the University Council's decisions, and sustenance of institutional development through policies, plans and strategies geared to advancement.

The sphere of Presidential responsibilities finds expression in five core offices - Academics, Research, Health Sciences, Planning, and Academic Support Services, each headed by a vice president. Another executive office is the KU General Secretariat, an arm of the institutional administrative affairs, headed by the Secretary General, which together with the five Vice Presidents, constitute Kuwait University's senior leadership and executive authority.

== Academic system ==
Kuwait University follows the Credit Hour System (approved hours), with teaching arranged on semester basis, except in the Faculty of Law, which follows the yearly system of continuous teaching, and the Health Sciences Center's faculties.

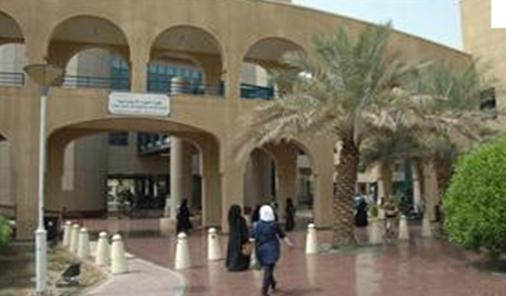
College of Social Sciences

Academic programs operate on a semester calendar beginning mid-September and finishing at the end of May. Each semester lasts about 15 to 17 weeks. The fall semester commences the second week of September and lasts until the end of December. The spring semester commences at the end of January and lasts until the end of May. Enrollment in the summer program is optional. It lasts eight weeks including the examination period, as approved by the university.

Information resources

Kuwait University Libraries (KUL) information resources contain 526,000 titles/651,000 volumes of Arabic and non-Arabic monographs, reference materials, dissertations and reports. KUL subscribes to 76 databases and E-Books - contain 10,000 titles in various fields - 1645 printed journals (Arabic, non-Arabic) and 783 online journals (Arabic, non-Arabic). In addition, the audio-visual collection consists of approximately 20,000 items including 9800 scientific films, manuscripts collection consists of 1300 original and 22,000 copy. The library catalog (OPAC) includes bibliographic records for the Arabic and foreign books and periodicals of all disciplines.

University rankings

Global – Overall
- QS World: 781-790 (2026)

Students admission process

The Admissions and Registration Deanship regulates the admission process, and is responsible for reviewing students’ applications and determining their admission, based on each program's requirements as established by the faculties and the University Council. The admissions decision is based on an aptitude test administered by the university 3 times a year. The Deanship oversees admitting students from other countries, and whether cultural scholarships will be awarded to them by the university; similarly, the Deanship also determines whether a degree will be awarded by the university.

Admission requirements

Admission is open to students who have successfully completed their secondary education and meet the requirements set forth by the university's admission policy. All admitted students choose the degree program they wish to join and the courses they wish to attend on a full-time basis. Students admitted to the College of Graduate Studies pursue their studies either on full- or part-time basis.

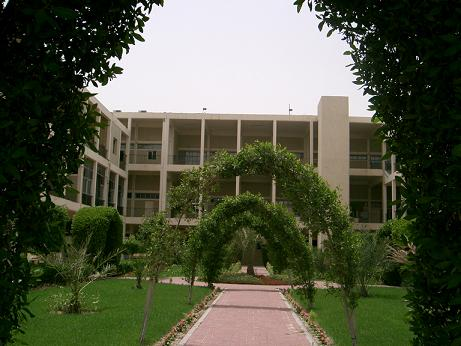
Adailiya Campus

Admission requirements may require students to take an aptitude test prior to being accepted to a faculty; in such instances, admission is determined using the equivalent average system (combining the student's high school grade point average (GPA) with the results of the aptitude test) as a prerequisite for admission to the College of Engineering and Petroleum, Allied Health Sciences, Administrative Sciences, Health Science Center, Life Sciences, and Computing Science and Engineering, or through personalized interviews, as determined by the College of Law, and the College of Education.

Transfer of students

Students may transfer internally from one department or faculty to another; students not currently enrolled may formally apply to transfer from another university to Kuwait University.

Credit system

With the exception of the Faculty of Law, the Faculty of Medicine, and the Faculty of Dentistry, the university follows the credit system, which makes it mandatory for each student to complete a minimum number of credits to qualify for the award of a degree. Students have the option of selecting courses to fulfill their major sheet requirements.

Academic majors and minors

An academic major consists of a group of courses necessary for specialization in a given discipline. An academic minor consists of a number of courses that usually constitute a less demanding specialization, taken in addition to the major.

Graduation time and requirements

Normally it takes eight semesters for students to successfully complete their programs, and to qualify for graduation. However, for the Engineering and Petroleum program, the courses normally last for nine semesters, and for the Architecture program, 10 semesters. The Medical and Dentistry programs require seven years of study to qualify for graduation. The pharmacy program requires 5 years of study. Students are awarded their university degrees upon successfully completing the required credit units.

Honors system

Each faculty maintains a list of its honors students who achieve a grade point average of 3.5 and above. Students who finish their program's requirements within the prescribed period and graduate with a grade point average of 3.67 are awarded an honors degree in recognition of their academic excellence.

== Colleges ==
The university has 16 colleges housing academic departments in addition to the College of Graduate Studies which oversees the graduate programs. The colleges and departments are as follows:

Architecture

- Department of Architecture
- Department of Visual Communication and Interiors

Arts

- Department of Arabic Language and Literature
- Department of English Language and Literature
- Department of French Language and Literature
- Department of History
- Department of Mass Communication
- Department of Philosophy

Business Administration

- Department of Accounting
- Department of Economics
- Department of Finance and Financial Institutions
- Department of Management and Marketing
- Department of Public Administration
- Department of Information Systems and Operation Management

Dentistry

- Department of Bioclinical Sciences
- Department of Developmental and Preventive Sciences
- Department of Diagnostic Sciences
- Department of General Dentistry
- Department of Restorative Sciences
- Department of Surgical Science

Education

- Department of Curriculum and Teaching Methods
- Department of Educational Administration and Planning
- Department of Educational Psychology
- Department of Foundations of Education

Law

- Department of International Law
- Department of Penal Law
- Department of Private Law
- Department of Public Law

Life Sciences

- Department of Communication Science and Languages
- Department of Environmental Technology Management
- Department of Food Science and Nutrition
- Department of Information Science

Medicine

- Department of Anatomy
- Department of Community Medicine and Behavioral Science
- Department of Medicine
- Department of Microbiology
- Department of Nuclear Medicine
- Department of Obstetrics and Gynecology
- Department of Pathology
- Department of Pediatrics
- Department of Pharmacology
- Department of Physiology
- Department of Psychiatry
- Department of Radiology
- Department of Surgery

Pharmacy

- Department of Pharmaceutical Chemistry
- Department of Pharmaceutics
- Department of Pharmacology and Therapeutics
- Department of Pharmacy Practice

Public Health

- Department of Environmental and Occupational Health
- Department of Epidemiology and Biostatistics
- Department of Health Policy and Management
- Department of Public Health Practice
- Department of Social and Behavioral Sciences

Science

- Department of Biological Sciences
- Department of Chemistry
- Department of Earth and Environmental Sciences
- Department of Marine Sciences
- Department of Mathematics
- Department of Physics
- Department of Statistics and Operations Research
- Department of Computer Science

Sharia and Islamic Studies

- Department of Belief, Invocation and Preaching Islam
- Department of Comparative Jurisprudence and Legitimate Policy
- Department of Jurisprudence and Rules
- Department of Qur'anic Interpretation and Prophetic Tradition (Hadith)

Social Sciences

- Department of Geography
- Department of Information Studies
- Department of Political Science
- Department of Psychology
- Department of Sociology and Social Work

College of Graduate Studies

== Notable alumni ==
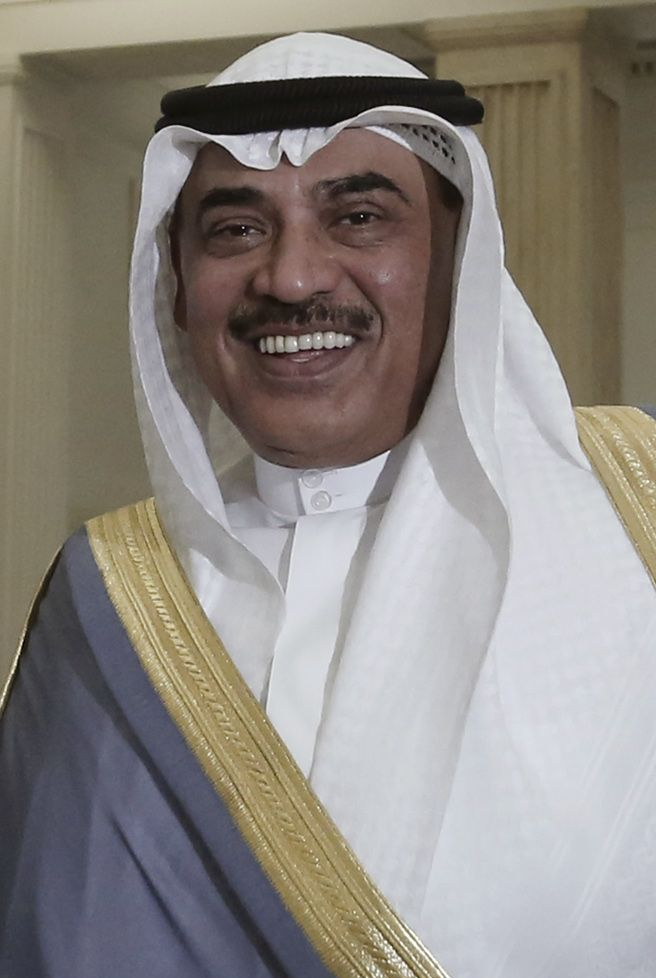
- Crown Prince Sabah Al-Khalid Al-Sabah graduated with a BA in political science in 1977.
  Baqer Al-Najjar

== See also ==
- Education in Kuwait
- List of universities in Kuwait
